= High-definition remasters for PlayStation consoles =

Official Collection and Classics HD banners used on PlayStation game covers

Sony has released a number of previously released PlayStation video games, remastered in high-definition (HD) for their newer consoles, a form of porting. A number of related programs exist, the most prominent two being "Classics HD" (also known as "HD Collection") and "PSP Remasters". The former consists of multiple PlayStation 2 games compiled on one Blu-ray Disc. The latter are individual PlayStation Portable games republished on Blu-ray. These games are not direct ports, but remastered versions in high-definition, to take advantage of the newer consoles' capabilities. The remastering of the games include updated graphics, new textures, and Trophy support, and some of the remastered games released on PlayStation 3 have included 3D and PlayStation Move support. Some HD remasters have also been released individually or in bundles as downloads on the PlayStation Store; others are released exclusively as downloads.

This remastering began in 2009 with the release of God of War Collection; it originally started as only PlayStation 2 (PS2) games being remastered for PlayStation 3 (PS3). PlayStation Portable (PSP) games began being remastered for the latter in 2011; Monster Hunter Portable 3rd HD ver. was the first of these. After the release of the PlayStation Vita in 2012, several of the remastered PS2 and PSP games began being released for this platform. Some original PlayStation (PS1) games also began being remastered. With the launch of the PlayStation 4 (PS4) in 2013, Vita and PS3 games, in addition to the older platforms' games, began being remastered for it. Developers have also remastered games that were not originally released on a PlayStation console and remastered them for PlayStation platforms, in addition to releasing them for other non-PlayStation platforms. This remastering extended to the PlayStation 5 (PS5) with its release in November 2020 with some of its launch titles being remastered PS4 games.

Classics HD is the official name given for these compilations in Europe; no equivalent of such name exists in North America or Japan. However, these games include the subtitle "Remastered in High Definition" or "HD Collection" on the North American cover. PSP Remasters is the official name given by Sony for collections featuring remasters of PSP games. The PSP Remasters line includes the same features as the Classics HD line, as well as cross-platform play and shareable saves between the two versions, however, PSP Remasters do not include Trophy support. Remastered games released on the PlayStation 4 have sometimes had the subtitle "HD Remaster", "Remastered", or "Definitive Edition". PlayStation 4 remasters have all the same features as remastered collections on PS3, but do not feature 3D or PlayStation Move support, though later releases could potentially support Move; 3D, however, is not a feature of the PlayStation 4 like it was on PlayStation 3.

== Overview ==
The first remastered collection to be released was God of War Collection, which consisted of God of War and God of War II. This collection was released before the official line of Classics HD games. God of War Collection was brought about from feedback in anticipation for God of War III and what type of content fans would like to see in a special edition of that game. From this feedback, Sony released the collection separate from God of War III as a way to introduce new players to the franchise. The success of God of War Collection prompted Sony to make a new line of games that would be bannered Classics HD in PAL regions (North American copies simply have the subtitle "Remastered in High Definition" or "HD Collection"). One of the reasons why this brand was created is that PlayStation 2 discs are not compatible with PlayStation 3 consoles released after August 2007 (only the original 20 GB and 60 GB models, and the first iteration of the 80 GB model are compatible).

The second series of games ported to the PlayStation 3 and first to use the Classics HD banner was The Sly Collection, released in November 2010. The Prince of Persia series was the first non-Sony published games remastered, published by Ubisoft. On November 2, 2010, God of War Collection became the first remastered collection to be released as a digital download on the PlayStation Store, and simultaneously the first time PlayStation 2-original games were released on the PlayStation Store. The Tomb Raider Trilogy was announced on December 19, 2010, and included all three second era games of the series: HD remasters of Tomb Raider: Legend and Tomb Raider: Anniversary for the first time on the PlayStation 3, plus Tomb Raider: Underworld.

At E3 2011 during Sony's press conference, the "PSP Remasters" line was announced. Monster Hunter Portable 3rd HD ver. was the first of this line to be announced. Sony Computer Entertainment Japan announced that the PSP Remasters line would not include Trophy support; God of War: Origins Collection, despite both games within it being remasters of PSP games, is not part of this line thus has Trophy support.

During an interview with Game Informer, Kingdom Hearts creator Tetsuya Nomura expressed interest in "HD versions" and was "researching them" for his Kingdom Hearts series. He said, "I would like to do something about the series being spread over so many different consoles, too. I am thinking a lot about the future." In September 2012, Square Enix announced Kingdom Hearts HD 1.5 Remix, a compilation for the PlayStation 3 including both Kingdom Hearts Final Mix and Re:Chain of Memories in HD with Trophy support. Additionally, the collection included HD cinematic scenes from Kingdom Hearts 358/2 Days, and released internationally in 2013. The following year, Kingdom Hearts HD 2.5 Remix released on PS3, containing Kingdom Hearts II Final Mix, Birth by Sleep Final Mix, and HD remastered cinematic scenes from Re:coded. The inclusion of Birth by Sleep Final Mix marked the first time that the final mix version was released outside Japan.

With the launch of the PlayStation 4, some developers have decided to take advantage of the more powerful hardware and remaster their previously released PlayStation 3 titles on the newer platform. Some of these previous titles also appeared on the Xbox 360 and some have been remastered for release on Xbox One and Microsoft Windows as well. These remastered versions sometimes include the subtitle "Definitive Edition". Developers have since stopped remastering games for older platforms and are only remastering games for the newer platforms.

An updated version of Injustice: Gods Among Us, titled Injustice: Gods Among Us Ultimate Edition and including all DLC of the original, was released in November 2013 for PlayStation 3, PlayStation 4, Xbox 360, Microsoft Windows, and PlayStation Vita. The PS4 version, which was a launch title, and the Windows version is remastered. In January 2014, Square Enix released an updated version of 2013's Tomb Raider as Tomb Raider: Definitive Edition for PlayStation 4 and Xbox One. In July 2014, Sony released The Last of Us Remastered for PlayStation 4. It is a remastered port of the PS3 title The Last of Us for the newer platform in terms of quality. In March 2015, Sony announced that PS3 title God of War III would be remastered and released as God of War III Remastered for the PlayStation 4 in July 2015, in celebration of the franchise's tenth anniversary. The remastered version features full 1080p support at 60 frames per second and a photo mode, allowing players to edit their photos and share them with their friends.

In anticipation for the PlayStation 4 exclusive Uncharted 4: A Thief's End, Sony released Uncharted: The Nathan Drake Collection for the PS4 in October 2015, featuring remastered versions of the PS3 titles, Uncharted: Drake's Fortune, Uncharted 2: Among Thieves, and Uncharted 3: Drake's Deception. The collection is single-player only (the PS3 versions of Uncharted 2 and Uncharted 3 had online multiplayer), and included a voucher for the Uncharted 4 multiplayer beta. To finish out the remastering of the Kingdom Hearts games, Kingdom Hearts HD 2.8 Final Chapter Prologue released in January 2017 and consisted of Kingdom Hearts 3D: Dream Drop Distance, Kingdom Hearts 0.2: Birth by Sleep – A Fragmentary Passage, and HD cinematics from Kingdom Hearts χ Back Cover. Unlike the previous two collections, which were exclusive to PlayStation 3, this collection released exclusively on PlayStation 4. Additionally, Kingdom Hearts HD 1.5 + 2.5 Remix, featuring both of the PS3 collections, released on PS4 in March 2017. Square Enix later bundled Kingdom Hearts HD 2.8 Final Chapter Prologue with the Kingdom Hearts HD 1.5 + 2.5 Remix collections as part of a new compilation, Kingdom Hearts: The Story So Far, released in North America on October 30, 2018, for the PlayStation 4. The Xbox One and Xbox Game Pass versions released on February 18, 2020.

Constructor HD was the first game that was released on the original PlayStation to be remastered when it released in January 2017. At E3 2016, it was announced that the original Crash Bandicoot trilogy, Crash Bandicoot, Crash Bandicoot 2: Cortex Strikes Back, and Crash Bandicoot: Warped, would be remastered for PlayStation 4. The name was revealed as the Crash Bandicoot N. Sane Trilogy at the PlayStation Experience event on December 3, 2016, which also revealed that it would release in 2017. Developer Vicarious Visions coined the term "remaster plus" in describing whether or not the N. Sane Trilogy was a remaster or a remake. They said that they did not consider it a remake, because they did not "fully remake [the games]". They said that they used Naughty Dog's original level geometry to rebuild the Crash gameplay from scratch. As the levels were coming together, they also added their own art, animation, and audio.

The cycle of remastering older games for newer platforms continued with the launch of the PlayStation 5 in November 2020, as some of its launch titles were remastered versions of previous generations' games. The Xbox Series X/S, which launched two days earlier on November 10, emphasized backwards compatibility with thousands of older Xbox titles alongside a launch lineup composed primarily of cross-generation releases.

=== Additional content ===
Along with Trophies, 3D support, and HD upgrades, the various compilations also boast various other extras to accompany them. God of War Collection, for example, contains bonus materials for God of War II that were originally released as a DVD in the God of War II two-disc set on PS2; early copies also included the God of War III demo. God of War: Origins Collection included the documentary, God of War – Game Directors Live, the Kratos Legionnaire bonus skin, and the Forest of the Forgotten combat arena, which were all originally released as a download via the Ghost of Sparta pre-order package. In Japan, the PS3 version of Metal Gear Solid: Peace Walker: HD Edition is standalone and includes a code to download the PSP version while Metal Gear Solid 2 and Metal Gear Solid 3 are packaged separately in Metal Gear Solid HD and come instead with a download code for the original Metal Gear Solid. In North America and Europe, the three HD games are packaged together in Metal Gear Solid HD Collection with no downloadable games. Tekken Hybrid not only includes an HD upgrade of Tekken Tag Tournament and a prologue based on Tekken Tag Tournament 2, but also comes with the 3D CGI film Tekken: Blood Vengeance. Though the actual games are not included, Kingdom Hearts HD 1.5 Remix includes the cut scenes from Kingdom Hearts 358/2 Days, remastered in high definition, and cut scenes from Kingdom Hearts Re:Coded are included in the Kingdom Hearts HD 2.5 Remix, also remastered in high definition.

To help showcase the addition of the PlayStation Move, The Sly Collection includes various additional minigames as well. The Ico & Shadow of the Colossus Collection features bonus content, including two XMB Dynamic Themes and exclusive video content for Ico, Shadow of the Colossus, and The Last Guardian; a demo for the latter was considered for inclusion, but was not. The collection also features the original PlayStation 2 cover arts for both games on the inner side of the case. The Silent Hill Collection includes both original and new recorded dialog for Silent Hill 2.

A notable feature with the PSP Remasters is that players can import saved games between the PSP version and the PS3 version and vice versa.

== Games ==
This following three lists contains games that have been remastered and released on the PlayStation 3, PlayStation Vita, and PlayStation 4 consoles. Some games are part of the original Classics HD and PSP Remasters line, which were PlayStation 2 and PlayStation Portable games, remastered and released exclusively on the PlayStation 3, followed by PlayStation Vita and PlayStation 4. Developers have extended the remastering of games to titles that were not PlayStation originals, and remastered releases have been released on platforms other than PlayStation. Originally, multiple games were remastered into collections, such as God of War Collection, featuring remastered versions of God of War and God of War II. Developers have since also remastered and released games individually, such as Killzone HD, which is a remastered version of Killzone.

=== PlayStation 3 ===
Title	Game(s)	Prev. Platform(s)	Developer(s)	First released	Japan	Europe	North America	3D	Move
Another World: 20th Anniversary Edition	Another World	Amiga; Atari ST	Delphine Software	July 8, 2014^{†}	Unreleased	July 8, 2014^{†}	July 8, 2014^{†}	No	No
Assassin's Creed: Liberation HD	Assassin's Creed III: Liberation	PlayStation Vita	Ubisoft	^{NA}January 14, 2014^{†}	March 27, 2014^{†}	January 15, 2014^{†}	January 14, 2014^{†}	No	No
Beyond Good & Evil HD	Beyond Good & Evil	Windows; GameCube; PlayStation 2; Xbox	Ubisoft Montpellier	^{EU}June 8, 2011^{†}	Unreleased	June 8, 2011^{†}	June 28, 2011^{†}	No	No
Call of Duty Classic	Call of Duty	Windows; Mac OS X	Infinity Ward	^{NA} December 3, 2009^{†}	Unreleased	December 10, 2009^{†}	December 3, 2009^{†}	No	No
Castlevania: Lords of Shadow – Mirror of Fate HD	Castlevania: Lords of Shadow – Mirror of Fate	Nintendo 3DS	MercurySteam	^{NA} October 29, 2013^{†}	December 4, 2013^{†}	October 30, 2013^{†}	October 29, 2013^{†}	No	No
Cel Damage HD	Cel Damage	GameCube; PlayStation 2; Xbox	Finish Line Games	^{NA}April 22, 2014^{†}	Unreleased	May 14, 2014^{†}	April 22, 2014^{†}	No	No
Darkstalkers Resurrection	Darkstalkers: The Night Warriors; Darkstalkers 3	Arcade; PlayStation; PlayStation 2; Saturn	Iron Galaxy Studios; Capcom	^{NA}March 12, 2013^{†}	March 14, 2013^{†}	March 13, 2013^{†}	March 12, 2013^{†}	No	No
Dead Space: Extraction	Dead Space: Extraction	Wii	Visceral Games	^{NA} January 25, 2011^{†}	Unreleased	January 26, 2011^{†}	January 25, 2011^{†}	No	Yes
Devil May Cry: HD Collection	Devil May Cry; Devil May Cry 2; Devil May Cry 3: Special Edition	Windows; PlayStation 2	Capcom	^{JP}March 22, 2012	March 22, 2012	April 3, 2012	April 3, 2012	No	No
Doom 3 BFG Edition	Doom 3; Resurrection of Evil; The Lost Mission	Windows; Linux; Xbox	Id Software	^{NA} October 16, 2012	November 22, 2012	October 19, 2012	October 16, 2012	Yes	No
Dragon Ball Z: Budokai - HD Collection	Budokai; Budokai 3	GameCube; PlayStation 2	Dimps; Bandai	^{EU}November 2, 2012	Unreleased	November 2, 2012	November 6, 2012	No	No
DuckTales: Remastered	DuckTales	NES	WayForward Technologies	^{NA} August 13, 2013	Unreleased	August 14, 2013^{†}	August 13, 2013	No	No
Dungeons & Dragons: Chronicles of Mystara	Tower of Doom; Shadow over Mystara	Arcade	Iron Galaxy Studios	^{NA} June 18, 2013^{†}	August 22, 2013	June 19, 2013^{†}	June 18, 2013^{†}	No	No
Dynasty Warriors: Strikeforce 2 HD Ver.	Dynasty Warriors: Strikeforce 2	PlayStation Portable	Koei	^{JP}July 26, 2012	July 26, 2012	Unreleased	Unreleased	Yes	No
Earthworm Jim HD	Earthworm Jim	Game Boy Advance; Windows; Genesis; Sega CD; SNES	Gameloft	^{EU} July 28, 2010^{†}	February 1, 2011^{†}	July 28, 2010^{†}	August 3, 2010^{†}	No	No
Far Cry Classic	Far Cry	Windows	Ubisoft	^{NA} February 11, 2014^{†}		February 12, 2014^{†}	February 11, 2014^{†}	No	No
Final Fantasy X/X-2 HD Remaster	Final Fantasy X; Final Fantasy X-2	PlayStation 2	Square (Square Enix)	^{JP}December 26, 2013	December 26, 2013	March 21, 2014	March 18, 2014	No	No
God of War Collection	God of War; God of War II	PlayStation 2	Santa Monica Studio; Bluepoint Games	^{NA}November 17, 2009	March 18, 2010	April 30, 2010	November 17, 2009	No	No
God of War: Origins Collection	Chains of Olympus; Ghost of Sparta	PlayStation Portable	Ready at Dawn; Santa Monica Studio	^{NA}September 13, 2011	October 6, 2011	September 16, 2011	September 13, 2011	Yes	No
GoldenEye 007: Reloaded	GoldenEye 007	Wii	Eurocom	^{NA} November 1, 2011	Unreleased	November 4, 2011	November 1, 2011	No	Yes
Grand Theft Auto: San Andreas HD	Grand Theft Auto: San Andreas	Windows; PlayStation 2; Xbox; Xbox 360	Rockstar North; Rockstar Games	^{NA}December 1, 2015	Unreleased	December 1, 2015	December 1, 2015	No	No
Hatsune Miku: Project DIVA Dreamy Theater	Hatsune Miku: Project DIVA	PlayStation Portable	SEGA; Crypton Future Media	^{JP}June 24, 2010^{†}	June 24, 2010^{†}	Unreleased	Unreleased	No	No
Hatsune Miku: Project DIVA Dreamy Theater 2nd	Hatsune Miku: Project DIVA 2nd	PlayStation Portable	SEGA; Crypton Future Media	^{JP}August 4, 2011^{†}	August 4, 2011^{†}	Unreleased	Unreleased	No	No
Hatsune Miku: Project DIVA Dreamy Theater Extend	Hatsune Miku: Project DIVA Extend	PlayStation Portable	SEGA; Crypton Future Media	^{JP}September 13, 2012^{†}	September 13, 2012^{†}	Unreleased	Unreleased	No	No
Hatsune Miku: Project DIVA F	Hatsune Miku: Project DIVA f	PlayStation Vita	Sega; Crypton Future Media	^{JP}March 7, 2013	March 7, 2013	September 4, 2013	August 27, 2013	No	No
Hatsune Miku: Project DIVA F 2nd	Hatsune Miku: Project DIVA f 2nd	PlayStation Vita	Sega; Crypton Future Media	^{JP}March 27, 2014	March 27, 2014	November 21, 2014	November 18, 2014	No	No
Hitman HD Trilogy	Silent Assassin; Contracts; Blood Money	GameCube; Windows; PlayStation 2; Xbox; Xbox 360	IO Interactive; Eidos Interactive	^{NA}January 29, 2013	Unreleased	February 1, 2013	January 29, 2013	Yes	No
The House of the Dead III	The House of the Dead III	Arcade; Windows; Xbox	Sega Wow; Sega	^{NA} February 7, 2012^{†}	April 19, 2012^{†}	February 15, 2012^{†}	February 7, 2012^{†}	No	Yes
The House of the Dead 4	The House of the Dead 4; The House of the Dead 4 Special	Arcade	Sega Wow; Sega	^{NA} April 17, 2012^{†}	April 19, 2012^{†}	April 18, 2012^{†}	April 17, 2012^{†}	No	Yes
The House of the Dead: Overkill – Extended Cut	The House of the Dead: Overkill	Wii	Headstrong Games	^{NA} October 25, 2011	February 23, 2012	October 28, 2011	October 25, 2011	Yes	Yes
The Ico & Shadow of the Colossus Collection	Ico; Shadow of the Colossus	PlayStation 2	Team Ico; Bluepoint Games	^{JP}September 22, 2011	September 22, 2011	September 28, 2011	September 27, 2011	Yes	No
Jak and Daxter Collection	The Precursor Legacy; Jak II; Jak 3	PlayStation 2	Naughty Dog; Mass Media Inc.	^{NA}February 7, 2012	Unreleased	February 22, 2012	February 7, 2012	Yes	No
Jet Set Radio HD	Jet Set Radio	Dreamcast	Smilebit	^{NA} September 18, 2012^{†}	February 20, 2013^{†}	September 19, 2012^{†}	September 18, 2012^{†}	No	No
Killzone HD	Killzone	PlayStation 2	Guerrilla Games	^{NA}October 23, 2012^{a}	Unreleased	October 24, 2012^{a}	October 23, 2012^{a}	No	No
Kingdom Hearts HD 1.5 Remix	Kingdom Hearts Final Mix; Re:Chain of Memories	PlayStation 2	Square Enix	^{JP}March 14, 2013	March 14, 2013	September 13, 2013	September 10, 2013	No	No
Kingdom Hearts HD 2.5 Remix	Kingdom Hearts II Final Mix; Birth by Sleep Final Mix	PlayStation 2; PlayStation Portable	Square Enix	^{JP}October 2, 2014	October 2, 2014	December 5, 2014	December 2, 2014	No	No
K-On! Houkago Live!! HD Ver.	K-On! Houkago Live!!	PlayStation Portable	Sega	^{JP}June 21, 2012	June 21, 2012	Unreleased	Unreleased	Yes	No
The Legend of Heroes: Trails in the Sky HD Edition	The Legend of Heroes: Trails in the Sky	Windows; PlayStation Portable	Falcom	^{JP}December 13, 2012	December 13, 2012 (FC); April 25, 2013 (SC); June 27, 2013 (the 3rd)	Unreleased	Unreleased	No	No
Legend of Kay Anniversary	Legend of Kay	PlayStation 2	Neon Studios; JoWood Productions; Capcom; Kaiko; THQ Nordic	July 28, 2015	Unreleased	July 28, 2015	July 28, 2015	No	No
Marvel vs. Capcom 2: New Age of Heroes	Marvel vs. Capcom 2: New Age of Heroes	Arcade; Dreamcast; PlayStation 2; Xbox	Backbone Entertainment; Capcom	^{NA}August 13, 2009^{†}	August 13, 2009^{†}	Unreleased	August 13, 2009^{†}	No	No
Medal of Honor: Frontline HD	Medal of Honor: Frontline	GameCube; PlayStation 2; Xbox	EA Los Angeles	^{NA}October 12, 2010^{†}	Unreleased	October 15, 2010^{†}	October 12, 2010^{†}	No	No
Metal Gear Solid HD Collection	Sons of Liberty; Snake Eater; Peace Walker	PlayStation 2; PlayStation Portable; Xbox	Kojima Productions; Bluepoint Games (MGS2 & 3); Genki (PW)	^{NA}November 8, 2011	November 10, 2011 (PW); November 23, 2011 (MGS2 & 3)	February 3, 2012	November 8, 2011	No	No
Mobile Suit Gundam Side Story: Missing Link	Rise from the Ashes; The Blue Destiny; Encounters in Space; Lost War Chronicles; Zeonic Front; Space, to The End of a Flash; Cross Dimension 0079	Dreamcast; PlayStation 2; Saturn	Bandai Namco Entertainment	^{JP} May 29, 2014	May 29, 2014	Unreleased	Unreleased	No	No
Monster Hunter Portable 3rd HD Ver.	Monster Hunter Portable 3rd	PlayStation Portable	Capcom	^{JP}August 25, 2011	August 25, 2011	Unreleased	Unreleased	Yes	No
Nights into Dreams... HD	Nights into Dreams...; Christmas Nights	Windows; PlayStation 2; Saturn	Sonic Team	^{NA} October 2, 2012^{†}	October 4, 2012^{†}	October 3, 2012^{†}	October 2, 2012^{†}	No	No
No More Heroes: Heroes' Paradise	No More Heroes	Wii	Grasshopper Manufacture; Feelplus; AQ Interactive	^{JP} April 15, 2010	April 15, 2010	May 20, 2011	August 16, 2011	No	Yes
Ninja Gaiden Sigma	Ninja Gaiden	Xbox	Team Ninja; Tecmo	^{JP} June 14, 2007	June 14, 2007	July 6, 2007	July 3, 2007	No	No
Ninja Gaiden Sigma 2	Ninja Gaiden II	Xbox	Team Ninja; Tecmo Koei	^{NA} September 29, 2009	October 1, 2009	October 2, 2009	September 29, 2009	No	No
The OddBoxx	Munch's Oddysee; Stranger's Wrath	PC; Xbox	Oddworld Inhabitants; Just Add Water	^{EU} December 21, 2011^{†}	Unreleased	December 19, 2012^{†}	December 24, 2012^{†}	Yes	Yes
Ōkami HD	Ōkami	PlayStation 2; Wii	Capcom; HexaDrive	^{NA}October 30, 2012^{†}	November 1, 2012	October 31, 2012^{†}	October 30, 2012^{†}	No	Yes
Prince of Persia Trilogy	The Sands of Time; Warrior Within; The Two Thrones	GameCube; Windows; PlayStation 2; PlayStation Portable; Wii; Xbox	Ubisoft Montreal; Ubisoft Sofia	^{EU}November 19, 2010	Unreleased	November 19, 2010	April 19, 2011	Yes	No
Ratchet & Clank Collection	Ratchet & Clank; Going Commando; Up Your Arsenal	PlayStation 2	Insomniac Games; Idol Minds	^{EU}June 29, 2012	September 6, 2012	June 29, 2012	August 28, 2012	Yes	No
Ratchet: Deadlocked HD	Ratchet: Deadlocked	PlayStation 2	Insomniac Games; Idol Minds	^{NA}May 21, 2013^{†}	Unreleased	September 25, 2013^{†}	May 21, 2013^{†}	Yes	No
Rayman 3 HD	Rayman 3: Hoodlum Havoc	GameCube; Mac OS X; Windows; PlayStation 2; Xbox	Ubisoft Montpellier	^{NA}March 20, 2012^{†}	Unreleased	March 21, 2012^{†}	March 20, 2012^{†}	No	No
Resident Evil 0: HD Remaster	Resident Evil 0	GameCube	Capcom	^{NA} January 19, 2016^{†}	January 21, 2016^{†}	January 19, 2016^{†}	January 19, 2016^{†}	No	No
Resident Evil HD Remaster	Resident Evil (2002)	GameCube	Capcom	^{JP} November 27, 2014	November 27, 2014	January 20, 2015^{†}	January 20, 2015^{†}	No	No
Resident Evil: Chronicles HD Collection	The Umbrella Chronicles; The Darkside Chronicles	Wii	Capcom	^{NA} June 26, 2012^{†}	June 28, 2012^{†}	June 27, 2012^{†}	June 26, 2012^{†}	No	Yes
Resident Evil: Revival Selection	Code: Veronica X; Resident Evil 4	Dreamcast; GameCube; Windows; PlayStation 2; Wii	Capcom	^{JP}September 8, 2011^{†}	September 8, 2011^{†}	September 21, 2011^{†}	September 20, 2011^{†}	No	No
Ryū ga Gotoku 1 & 2: HD Edition	Ryū Ga Gotoku; Ryū Ga Gotoku 2	PlayStation 2	Amusement Vision; Sega	^{JP}November 1, 2012	November 1, 2012	Unreleased	Unreleased	No	No
Sengoku Basara HD Collection	Sengoku Basara; Sengoku Basara 2; Sengoku Basara 2 Heroes	PlayStation 2; Wii	Capcom	^{JP}August 30, 2012	August 30, 2012	Unreleased	Unreleased	No	No
Samurai Warriors 2 with Xtreme Legends & Empires HD Version	Samurai Warriors 2; Xtreme Legends; Empires	Windows; PlayStation 2; Xbox 360	Koei	^{JP}October 24, 2013	October 24, 2013	Unreleased	Unreleased	No	No
Silent Hill HD Collection	Silent Hill 2; Silent Hill 3	Windows; PlayStation 2; Xbox	Konami; Hijinx Studios	^{EU}March 16, 2012	March 29, 2012	March 16, 2012	March 20, 2012	No	No
The Sly Collection	The Thievius Raccoonus; Band of Thieves; Honor Among Thieves	PlayStation 2	Sucker Punch Productions; Sanzaru Games	^{NA}November 9, 2010	January 27, 2011	December 3, 2010	November 9, 2010	Yes	Yes
Sonic Adventure HD	Sonic Adventure	Dreamcast; GameCube	Sega	^{NA} September 20, 2010^{†}	September 29, 2010^{†}	September 21, 2010^{†}	September 20, 2010^{†}	No	No
Sonic Adventure 2 HD	Sonic Adventure 2	Dreamcast; GameCube	Sega	^{NA} October 2, 2012^{†}	October 4, 2012^{†}	October 3, 2012^{†}	October 2, 2012^{†}	No	No
Soulcalibur II HD Online	Soulcalibur II	Arcade; GameCube; PlayStation 2; Xbox	Namco	^{NA}November 19, 2013^{†}	February 20, 2014^{†}	November 20, 2013^{†}	November 19, 2013^{†}	No	No
Space Channel 5: Part 2	Space Channel 5: Part 2	Dreamcast; PlayStation 2	United Game Artists; Sega; SCEE; Agetec	^{JP} October 5, 2011^{†}	October 5, 2011^{†}	October 5, 2011^{†}	October 5, 2011^{†}	No	No
Super Street Fighter II Turbo HD Remix	Super Street Fighter II Turbo	Arcade; Amiga; CD32; MS-DOS; 3DO; Dreamcast; Game Boy Advance; PlayStation; Saturn	BackBone Entertainment; Capcom	^{NA}November 25, 2008^{†}	Unreleased	February 19, 2009^{†}	November 25, 2008^{†}	No	No
Street Fighter III: 3rd Strike Online Edition	Street Fighter III: 3rd Strike	Arcade; Dreamcast; PlayStation 2; Xbox	Iron Galaxy Studios; Capcom	^{NA}August 23, 2011^{†}	August 23, 2011^{†}	August 24, 2011^{†}	August 23, 2011^{†}	No	No
Syberia Collection	Syberia; Syberia II	Windows; PlayStation 2; Xbox	Microïds; Nordic Games	^{EU}August 29, 2015	Unreleased	August 29, 2015	October 27, 2015	No	No
Tales of Graces ƒ	Tales of Graces	Wii	Namco Tales Studio	^{JP} December 2, 2010	December 2, 2010	August 31, 2012	March 13, 2012	No	No
Tales of Symphonia Chronicles	Tales of Symphonia; Dawn of the New World	GameCube; PlayStation 2; Wii	Bandai Namco Entertainment	^{JP} October 10, 2013	October 10, 2013	February 28, 2014	February 25, 2014	No	No
Tekken 5: Dark Resurrection Online	Tekken 5: Dark Resurrection	Arcade	Namco	^{JP}December 12, 2006^{†}	December 12, 2006^{†}	March 23, 2007^{†}	March 23, 2007^{†}	No	No
Tekken Hybrid	Tekken Tag Tournament HD; Tekken Tag Tournament 2: Prologue	Arcade; PlayStation 2	Namco	^{NA}November 22, 2011	December 1, 2011	November 25, 2011	November 22, 2011	Yes	No
Time Crisis 4	Time Crisis 4	Arcade	Nex Entertainment; Bandai Namco	^{NA}November 20, 2007	December 20, 2007	April 18, 2008	November 20, 2007	No	No
Time Crisis Razing Storm	Time Crisis 4; Time Crisis Razing Storm; Deadstorm Pirates	Arcade	Nex Entertainment; Bandai Namco	^{NA}October 19, 2010	October 21, 2010	November 5, 2010	October 19, 2010	No	Yes
Tom Clancy's Splinter Cell: Classic Trilogy HD	Splinter Cell; Pandora Tomorrow; Chaos Theory	Windows; Mac OS X; Xbox	Ubisoft Pune	^{EU}August 9, 2011	Unreleased	August 9, 2011	September 27, 2011	Yes	No
The Tomb Raider Trilogy	Legend; Anniversary; Underworld	GameCube; Windows; PlayStation 2; PlayStation Portable; Wii; Xbox; Xbox 360	Crystal Dynamics; Buzz Monkey Software	^{NA}March 22, 2011	Unreleased	March 25, 2011	March 22, 2011	No	No
Under Defeat HD	Under Defeat	Arcade; Dreamcast	G.rev	^{JP} February 23, 2012	February 23, 2012	January 25, 2013	November 28, 2012	No	No
Zone of the Enders HD Collection	Zone of the Enders; The 2nd Runner	PlayStation 2	Kojima Productions; High Voltage Software; HexaDrive (ver. 2.0 patch)	^{JP}October 25, 2012	October 25, 2012	November 30, 2012	October 30, 2012	No	No

^†Released exclusively as download.
^aReleased as a download and as part of the Killzone Trilogy.

=== PlayStation Vita ===
Title	Game(s)	Prev. Platform(s)	Developer(s)	First released	Japan	Europe	North America
Another World: 20th Anniversary Edition	Another World	Amiga; Atari ST	Delphine Software	July 8, 2014^{†}	Unreleased	July 8, 2014^{†}	July 8, 2014^{†}
Cel Damage HD	Cel Damage	GameCube; PlayStation 2; Xbox	Finish Line Games	^{NA}April 22, 2014^{†}^{a}	Unreleased	May 14, 2014^{†}	April 22, 2014^{†}
Final Fantasy X/X-2 HD Remaster	Final Fantasy X; Final Fantasy X-2	PlayStation 2	Square Enix	^{JP}December 26, 2013^{a}	December 26, 2013	March 21, 2014	March 18, 2014
Full Throttle Remastered	Full Throttle	MS-DOS; Mac OS	LucasArts; Double Fine Productions	2017	2017	2017	2017
God of War Collection	God of War; God of War II	PlayStation 2	Santa Monica Studio; Bluepoint Games; Sanzaru Games	^{NA}May 6, 2014^{b}	May 15, 2014	May 9, 2014	May 6, 2014
Grim Fandango Remastered	Grim Fandango	Microsoft Windows	LucasArts; Double Fine Productions	January 27, 2015	January 27, 2015	January 27, 2015	January 27, 2015
Jak and Daxter Collection	The Precursor Legacy; Jak II; Jak 3	PlayStation 2	Naughty Dog; Mass Media Inc.	^{NA}June 18, 2013^{b}	Unreleased	June 19, 2013	June 18, 2013
Jet Set Radio HD	Jet Set Radio	Dreamcast; Java ME; Game Boy Advance	Smilebit	^{NA} September 18, 2012^{†}	February 20, 2013^{†}	September 19, 2012^{†}	September 18, 2012^{†}
Metal Gear Solid HD Collection	Sons of Liberty; Snake Eater	Microsoft Windows; PlayStation 2; Xbox	Kojima Productions; Armature Studio	^{NA}June 12, 2012^{b}	June 28, 2012	June 29, 2012	June 12, 2012
Ratchet & Clank Collection	Ratchet & Clank; Going Commando; Up Your Arsenal	PlayStation 2	Insomniac Games; Mass Media Inc.	^{EU}July 2, 2014^{b}	Unreleased	July 2, 2014	July 29, 2014^{†}
Samurai Warriors 2 with Xtreme Legends & Empires HD Version	Samurai Warriors 2; Xtreme Legends; Empires	Microsoft Windows; PlayStation 2; Xbox 360	Koei	^{JP}October 24, 2013^{a}	October 24, 2013	Unreleased	Unreleased
The Legend of Heroes: Trails in the Sky FC Evolution	The Legend of Heroes: Trails in the Sky	Microsoft Windows; PlayStation Portable	Falcom	^{JP}June 11, 2015^{b}	June 11, 2015	Unreleased	Unreleased
The OddBoxx	Munch's Oddysee; Stranger's Wrath	Game Boy Advance; Microsoft Windows; Xbox	Oddworld Inhabitants; Just Add Water	^{EU} December 21, 2011^{†}	Unreleased	December 19, 2012^{†}	December 24, 2012^{†}
The Sly Collection	The Thievius Raccoonus; Band of Thieves; Honor Among Thieves	PlayStation 2	Sucker Punch Productions; Sanzaru Games	^{EU}April 18, 2014^{b}	Unreleased	April 18, 2014	May 27, 2014

^†Released exclusively as download.
^aReleased at same time as PS3 remaster version.
^bRemaster originally released on PS3 before Vita.

=== PlayStation 4 ===
Title	Game(s)	Prev. Platform(s)	Developer(s)	First released	Japan	Europe	North America
Another World: 20th Anniversary Edition^{a}	Another World	Amiga; Atari ST	Delphine Software	July 8, 2014^{†}	Unreleased	July 8, 2014^{†}	July 8, 2014^{†}
Assassin's Creed: The Ezio Collection	Assassin's Creed II; Brotherhood; Revelations	Mac OS X; Microsoft Windows; PlayStation 3; Xbox 360	Ubisoft Montreal	^{NA}November 15, 2016	Unreleased	November 18, 2016	November 15, 2016
Assassin's Creed III Remastered	Assassin's Creed III	Microsoft Windows; PlayStation 3; Xbox 360; Wii U	Ubisoft Montreal	^{NA}March 29, 2019	March 29, 2019	March 29, 2019	March 29, 2019
Assassin's Creed Rogue Remastered	Assassin's Creed Rogue	Microsoft Windows; PlayStation 3; Xbox 360	Ubisoft Sofia; Ubisoft Kiev; Ubisoft Pune	^{NA}March 20, 2018	March 22, 2018	March 20, 2018	March 20, 2018
Baja: Edge of Control HD	Baja: Edge of Control	PlayStation 3; Xbox 360	2XL Games; THQ; BlitWorks; THQ Nordic	September 14, 2017	Unreleased	September 14, 2017	September 14, 2017
Batman: Return to Arkham	Arkham Asylum; Arkham City	Mac OS X; Microsoft Windows; PlayStation 3; Wii U; Xbox 360	Rocksteady Studios; Virtuos	^{NA}October 18, 2016	February 23, 2017	October 21, 2016	October 18, 2016
BioShock: The Collection	BioShock; BioShock 2; Infinite	Mac OS X; Microsoft Windows; PlayStation 3; Xbox 360	Blind Squirrel Games	^{NA}September 13, 2016	September 16, 2016	September 16, 2016	September 13, 2016
Borderlands: The Handsome Collection	Borderlands 2; The Pre-Sequel!	Microsoft Windows; OS X; Linux; PlayStation 3; PlayStation Vita; Xbox 360	Gearbox Software; Armature Studio; 2K Australia; Iron Galaxy Studios	^{NA}March 24, 2015	March 27, 2015	March 27, 2015	March 24, 2015
Borderlands Legendary Collection	Borderlands; Borderlands 2; The Pre-Sequel!	Microsoft Windows; OS X; Linux; PlayStation 3; PlayStation Vita; Xbox 360	Gearbox Software; Armature Studio; Behaviour Interactive; 2K Australia; Iron Galaxy Studios; Turn Me Up Games	^{NA}May 29, 2020	May 29, 2020	May 29, 2020	May 29, 2020
Bulletstorm: Full Clip Edition	Bulletstorm	Microsoft Windows; PlayStation 3; Xbox 360	People Can Fly; Epic Games	April 7, 2017	September 14, 2017	April 7, 2017	April 7, 2017
Burnout Paradise Remastered	Burnout Paradise	Microsoft Windows; PlayStation 3; Xbox 360	Criterion Games	March 16, 2018	March 16, 2018	March 16, 2018	March 16, 2018
CastleStorm: Definitive Edition	CastleStorm	Microsoft Windows; PlayStation 3; PlayStation Vita; Wii U; Xbox 360	Zen Studios	September 23, 2014	September 23, 2014	September 23, 2014	September 23, 2014
Cel Damage HD^{a}	Cel Damage	GameCube; PlayStation 2; Xbox	Finish Line Games	^{NA}April 22, 2014^{†}	Unreleased	May 14, 2014	April 22, 2014
Constructor HD	Constructor	MS-DOS; Microsoft Windows; Mac OS; PlayStation; PlayStation 3; PlayStation Portable	System 3	May 28, 2017	May 28, 2017	May 28, 2017	May 28, 2017
Crash Bandicoot N. Sane Trilogy	Crash Bandicoot; Cortex Strikes Back; Warped	PlayStation	Naughty Dog; Vicarious Visions	June 30, 2017	August 3, 2017	June 30, 2017	June 30, 2017
Darksiders: Warmastered Edition	Darksiders	PlayStation 3; Xbox 360	Vigil Games; THQ; Kaiko; THQ Nordic	November 22, 2016	Unreleased	November 22, 2016	November 22, 2016
Darksiders II: Deathinitive Edition	Darksiders II	PlayStation 3; Xbox 360; Wii U	Vigil Games; THQ; Gunfire Games; Kaiko; THQ Nordic	October 27, 2015	Unreleased	October 27, 2015	October 27, 2015
Dead Rising Triple Pack	Dead Rising; Dead Rising 2; Dead Rising 2: Off the Record	Microsoft Windows; PlayStation 3; Xbox 360	Capcom	September 13, 2016	September 13, 2016	September 13, 2016	September 13, 2016
Devil May Cry 4 Special Edition	Devil May Cry 4	Microsoft Windows; PlayStation 3; Xbox 360	Capcom; Access Games	^{JP}June 18, 2015	June 18, 2015	June 23, 2015	June 23, 2015
Dishonored: Definitive Edition	Dishonored	Microsoft Windows; PlayStation 3; Xbox 360	Arkane Studios	^{NA}August 25, 2015	August 27, 2015	August 28, 2015	August 25, 2015
DmC: Definitive Edition	DmC: Devil May Cry	Microsoft Windows; PlayStation 3; Xbox 360	Ninja Theory; QLOC	March 10, 2015	March 10, 2015	March 10, 2015	March 10, 2015
Final Fantasy Type-0 HD	Final Fantasy Type-0	PlayStation Portable	Square Enix 1st Production Department; HexaDrive	^{NA}March 17, 2015	March 19, 2015	March 20, 2015	March 17, 2015
Final Fantasy VII^{†}	Final Fantasy VII	PlayStation	Square; Square Enix; DotEmu	^{JP}December 4, 2015	December 4, 2015	December 5, 2015	December 5, 2015
Final Fantasy VIII Remastered^{†}	Final Fantasy VIII	PlayStation	Square; Square Enix; DotEmu	^{JP}September 3, 2019	September 3, 2019	September 3, 2019	September 3, 2019
Final Fantasy IX^{†}	Final Fantasy IX	PlayStation	Square; Square Enix	September 19, 2017	September 19, 2017	September 19, 2017	September 19, 2017
Final Fantasy X/X-2 HD Remaster^{b}	Final Fantasy X; Final Fantasy X-2	PlayStation 2	Square; Square Enix	^{NA}May 12, 2015	May 14, 2015	May 15, 2015	May 12, 2015
Final Fantasy XII: The Zodiac Age	Final Fantasy XII	PlayStation 2	Square Enix	July 11, 2017	July 13, 2017	July 11, 2017	July 11, 2017
Full Throttle Remastered^{†}	Full Throttle	MS-DOS; Microsoft Windows; Mac OS	LucasArts; Double Fine Productions	April 18, 2017	Unreleased	April 18, 2017	April 18, 2017
God of War III Remastered	God of War III	PlayStation 3	Santa Monica Studio; Wholesale Algorithms	^{NA}July 14, 2015	July 16, 2015	July 15, 2015	July 14, 2015
Gravity Rush Remastered	Gravity Rush	PlayStation Vita	Project Siren; Bluepoint Games	^{JP}December 10, 2015	December 10, 2015	February 5, 2016	February 2, 2016
Grim Fandango Remastered	Grim Fandango	Microsoft Windows	LucasArts; Double Fine Productions	January 27, 2015	January 27, 2015	January 27, 2015	January 27, 2015
Hatsune Miku: Project DIVA Future Tone	Hatsune Miku: Project DIVA Arcade Future Tone	Arcade	Sega AM2; SEGA	^{JP}June 23, 2016	June 23, 2016	January 10, 2017	January 10, 2017
Hatsune Miku: Project DIVA Future Tone DX	Hatsune Miku: Project DIVA Arcade Future Tone	Arcade	Sega AM2; SEGA	^{JP}November 22, 2017	November 22, 2017	Unreleased	Unreleased
Hitman HD Enhanced Collection	Hitman Absolution; Hitman Blood Money	PlayStation 2; PlayStation 3; Xbox; Xbox 360; Microsoft Windows	IO Interactive; WB Games	January 11, 2019	January 11, 2019	January 11, 2019	January 11, 2019
Injustice: Gods Among Us Ultimate Edition^{c}	Injustice: Gods Among Us	PlayStation 3; Wii U; Xbox 360	NetherRealm Studios; High Voltage Software	^{NA}November 15, 2013	Unreleased	November 29, 2013	November 15, 2013
Kingdom Hearts HD 1.5 + 2.5 Remix^{b}	Kingdom Hearts Final Mix; Re:Chain of Memories; Kingdom Hearts II Final Mix; Birth by Sleep Final Mix	PlayStation 2; PlayStation Portable	Square Enix	^{JP}March 9, 2017	March 9, 2017	March 31, 2017	March 28, 2017
Kingdom Hearts HD 2.8 Final Chapter Prologue	3D: Dream Drop Distance	Nintendo 3DS	Square Enix 1st Production Department	^{JP}January 12, 2017	January 12, 2017	January 24, 2017	January 24, 2017
Kingdom Hearts: The Story So Far	Kingdom Hearts Final Mix; Re:Chain of Memories; Kingdom Hearts II Final Mix; Birth by Sleep Final Mix; 3D: Dream Drop Distance	PlayStation 2; PlayStation Portable; Nintendo 3DS	Square Enix; Square Enix 1st Production Department	^{NA}October 30, 2018	Unreleased	March 29, 2019	October 30, 2018
L.A. Noire^{a}	L.A. Noire	Microsoft Windows; PlayStation 3; Xbox 360	Neon Studios; Team Bondi; Rockstar Games	14 November 2017	November 14, 2017	November 14, 2017	November 14, 2017
Legend of Kay Anniversary^{a}	Legend of Kay	PlayStation 2	Neon Studios; JoWood Productions; Capcom; Kaiko; THQ Nordic	July 28, 2015	Unreleased	July 28, 2015	July 28, 2015
Lock's Quest Remastered	Lock's Quest	Nintendo DS	5th Cell; THQ; Digital Continue; THQ Nordic	April 25, 2017	Unreleased	April 25, 2017	April 25, 2017
LocoRoco Remastered	LocoRoco	PlayStation Portable	Japan Studio	May 9, 2017	June 22, 2017	May 9, 2017^{†}	May 9, 2017^{†}
LocoRoco 2 Remastered	LocoRoco 2	PlayStation Portable	Japan Studio	December 9, 2017	December 14, 2017	December 9, 2017^{†}	December 9, 2017^{†}
Marvel: Ultimate Alliance Bundle	Ultimate Alliance; Ultimate Alliance 2	Game Boy Advance; Nintendo DS; Microsoft Windows; PlayStation 2; PlayStation 3; PlayStation Portable; Wii; Xbox; Xbox 360	Raven Software; Vicarious Visions	July 26, 2016	Unreleased	July 26, 2016	July 26, 2016
Metro Redux	2033; Last Light	PlayStation 3; Xbox 360	4A Games; THQ; Deep Silver	August 26, 2014	Unreleased	August 26, 2014	August 26, 2014
Ōkami HD^{b}	Ōkami	PlayStation 2; PlayStation 3; Wii	Capcom	December 12, 2017	December 21, 2017	December 12, 2017	December 12, 2017
Onimusha: Warlords HD	Onimusha: Warlords	PlayStation 2; Xbox; Microsoft Windows	Capcom	December 20, 2018	December 20, 2018	January 15, 2019	January 15, 2019
PaRappa the Rapper Remastered	PaRappa the Rapper	PlayStation; PlayStation Portable	NanaOn-Sha	April 4, 2017	April 20, 2017	April 4, 2017^{†}	April 4, 2017^{†}
Patapon Remastered	Patapon	PlayStation Portable	Pyramid; Japan Studio	August 1, 2017	September 21, 2017	August 1, 2017^{†}	August 1, 2017^{†}
Patapon 2 Remastered	Patapon 2	PlayStation Portable	Piramid; Japan Studio	January 30, 2020	January 30, 2020	January 30, 2020^{†}	January 30, 2020^{†}
Quantic Dream Collection^{e}	Detroit: Become Human; Beyond: Two Souls; Heavy Rain	PlayStation 3	Quantic Dream	^{NA}December 4, 2018	Unreleased	December 4, 2018	December 4, 2018
Resident Evil: Origins Collection	Resident Evil; Resident Evil 0	GameCube; Wii	Capcom	^{NA}January 19, 2016	January 21, 2016	January 22, 2016	January 19, 2016
Resident Evil 4	Resident Evil 4	Microsoft Windows; PlayStation 2; PlayStation 3; GameCube; Wii; Xbox 360; iOS; Android; Zeebo	Capcom	August 30, 2016	August 30, 2016	August 30, 2016	August 30, 2016
Resident Evil 5	Resident Evil 5	Microsoft Windows; PlayStation 3; Xbox 360; Shield Android TV	Capcom	June 28, 2016	June 28, 2016	June 28, 2016	June 28, 2016
Resident Evil 6	Resident Evil 6	Microsoft Windows; PlayStation 3; Xbox 360	Capcom	March 29, 2016	March 29, 2016	March 29, 2016	March 29, 2016
Romancing SaGa 2^{†}	Romancing SaGa 2	Super Famicom	Square (Square Enix)	December 15, 2017	December 15, 2017	December 15, 2017	December 15, 2017
Shadow of the Colossus	Shadow of the Colossus	PlayStation 2; PlayStation 3	Bluepoint Games; Sony Computer Entertainment	^{NA}February 6, 2018	February 8, 2018	February 6, 2018	February 6, 2018
Shin Megami Tensei III: Nocturne HD Remaster	Shin Megami Tensei III: Nocturne	PlayStation 2	Atlus	^{JP}October 29, 2020	October 29, 2020	May 25, 2021	May 25, 2021
Shining Resonance Refrain	Shining Resonance	PlayStation 3	Sega	^{JP}March 29, 2018	March 29, 2018	July 10, 2018	July 10, 2018
Sleeping Dogs: Definitive Edition	Sleeping Dogs	Microsoft Windows; PlayStation 3; Xbox 360	United Front Games	^{EU}October 10, 2014	Unreleased	October 10, 2014	October 14, 2014
Spyro Reignited Trilogy	Spyro the Dragon; Ripto's Rage!; Year of the Dragon	PlayStation	Insomniac Games; Toys for Bob	November 13, 2018	Unreleased	November 13, 2018	November 13, 2018
Star Ocean: The Last Hope – 4K & Full HD Remaster^{†}	The Last Hope	PlayStation 3; Xbox 360	tri-Ace	November 28, 2017	November 28, 2017	November 28, 2017	November 28, 2017
The Elder Scrolls V: Skyrim – Special Edition	Skyrim; Dawnguard; Hearthfire; Dragonborn	Microsoft Windows; PlayStation 3; Xbox 360	Bethesda Game Studios	October 28, 2016	October 28, 2016	October 28, 2016	October 28, 2016
The Last of Us Remastered	The Last of Us	PlayStation 3	Naughty Dog	^{NA}July 29, 2014	August 21, 2014	July 30, 2014	July 29, 2014
Titan Quest Anniversary Edition	Titan Quest	Microsoft Windows	Iron Lore Entertainment; THQ; Black Forest Games; Pieces Interactive; THQ Nordic	^{EU}March 20, 2018	Unreleased	March 20, 2018	March 20, 2018
Tomb Raider: Definitive Edition	Tomb Raider	Microsoft Windows; OS X; Linux; PlayStation 3; Xbox 360	Crystal Dynamics	^{NA}January 28, 2014	February 22, 2014	January 31, 2014	January 28, 2014
Ultra Street Fighter IV	Ultra Street Fighter IV	Arcade; PlayStation 3; Xbox 360; Microsoft Windows; iOS; Android	Other Ocean Interactive; Capcom	^{NA}May 26, 2015^{†}	September 4, 2015^{†}	May 26, 2015^{†}	May 26, 2015^{†}
Uncharted: The Nathan Drake Collection	Drake's Fortune; Among Thieves; Drake's Deception	PlayStation 3	Naughty Dog; Bluepoint Games	^{EU}October 7, 2015	October 8, 2015	October 7, 2015	October 9, 2015
Valkyria Chronicles Remastered	Valkyria Chronicles	Microsoft Windows; PlayStation 3	Sega	^{JP}February 10, 2016	February 10, 2016	May 17, 2016	May 17, 2016
WipEout Omega Collection	HD; Fury; 2048	PlayStation 3; PlayStation Vita	XDev; Clever Beans; EPOS Game Studios	^{NA}June 6, 2017	June 8, 2017^{†}	June 7, 2017	June 6, 2017
.hack//G.U. Last Recode	.hack//G.U. Vol. 1//Rebirth; .hack//G.U. Vol. 2//Reminisce; .hack//G.U. Vol. 3//Redemption	PlayStation 2	CyberConnect2; Bandai; Bandai Namco Entertainment	^{NA}November 3, 2017	November 3, 2017	November 3, 2017	November 3, 2017

^†Released exclusively as download.
^aReleased at same time as PS3 and/or Vita remastered version.
^bRemaster originally released on PS3 and/or Vita before PS4.
^cThe Ultimate Edition was released on other platforms, but the PS4 and PC versions are remastered.
^dNew game that takes place after the original Birth by Sleep.
^eBeyond: Two Souls remastered was released as a standalone before the collection on November 24, 2015. Heavy Rain remastered was released as a standalone on March 1, 2016 (North America) and March 4, 2016 (Europe).

=== PlayStation 5 ===
Title	Game(s)	Prev. Platform(s)	Developer(s)	First released	Japan	Europe	North America
Dead Rising Deluxe Remaster	Dead Rising	Microsoft Windows; PlayStation 3; PlayStation 4; Xbox 360; Xbox One	Capcom	September 19, 2024	September 12, 2024	September 19, 2024	September 19, 2024
Dead Space	Dead Space	Microsoft Windows; PlayStation 3; Xbox 360	Motive Studio; Electronic Arts	January 27, 2023	Unreleased	January 27, 2023	January 27, 2023
Demon's Souls	Demon's Souls	PlayStation 3	Japan Studio; Bluepoint Games; FromSoftware	November 12, 2020	November 12, 2020	November 12, 2020	November 12, 2020
Devil May Cry 5: Special Edition	Devil May Cry 5	Microsoft Windows; PlayStation 4; Xbox One	Capcom	November 12, 2020	November 12, 2020	November 19, 2020	November 12, 2020
Go! Go! 5 Jigen Game Neptune: reVerse	Hyperdimension Neptunia	Microsoft Windows; PlayStation 3; PlayStation 4; PlayStation Vita	Idea Factory; Compile Heart	December 17, 2020	December 17, 2020	Unreleased	Unreleased
Marvel's Spider-Man Remastered^{†}	Marvel's Spider-Man	PlayStation 4	Insomniac Games	November 12, 2020	November 12, 2020	November 19, 2020	November 12, 2020
Nioh Remastered - The Complete Edition	Nioh	Microsoft Windows; PlayStation 4	Team Ninja	February 5, 2021	February 5, 2021	February 5, 2021	February 5, 2021
Nioh 2 Remastered - The Complete Edition	Nioh 2	PlayStation 4	Team Ninja	February 5, 2021	February 5, 2021	February 5, 2021	February 5, 2021
Overcooked: All You Can Eat	Overcooked	Microsoft Windows; Nintendo Switch; PlayStation 4; Xbox One	Ghost Town Games	November 12, 2020	November 12, 2020	November 19, 2020	November 12, 2020
The Last of Us Part I	The Last of Us	PlayStation 3	Naughty Dog	September 2, 2022	September 2, 2022	September 2, 2022	September 2, 2022

|-^†Released exclusively as download.

== PlayStation Collections ==
PlayStation Collections are bundles of games for the PlayStation 3. They contain both remastered games and games that have already been released for the PS3, in addition to bonus content. The first collections announced in this line were the God of War Saga and the Infamous Collection, which were released on August 28, 2012, along with the Ratchet & Clank Collection, which was rebranded for this new line.

Title	Game(s)	Developer(s)	First released	Japan	Europe	North America	3D	Move
Assassin's Creed Ezio Trilogy	Assassin's Creed II; Brotherhood; Revelations	Ubisoft Montreal	^{JP}September 6, 2012	September 6, 2012	Unreleased	November 13, 2012	No	No
Assassin's Creed: The America's Collection	Liberation HD; Assassin's Creed III; Black Flag	Ubisoft Montreal	^{EU}October 3, 2014	Unreleased	October 3, 2014	October 28, 2014	No	No
Best of PlayStation Network Vol. 1	Fat Princess; Sound Shapes; Tokyo Jungle; When Vikings Attack!	SCEA	^{NA}June 25, 2013	Unreleased	Unreleased	June 25, 2013	No	No
Castlevania: Lords of Shadow Collection	Lords of Shadow; Mirror of Fate HD^{†}	MercurySteam; Kojima Productions	^{NA}November 5, 2013	Unreleased	November 8, 2013	November 5, 2013	No	No
Final Fantasy 25th Anniversary Ultimate Box	Final Fantasy I; Final Fantasy II; Final Fantasy III; Final Fantasy IV; Final Fantasy V; Final Fantasy VI; Final Fantasy VII; Final Fantasy VIII; Final Fantasy IX; Final Fantasy X; Final Fantasy XI; Final Fantasy XII; Final Fantasy XIII	Square Enix	^{JP}December 18, 2012	December 18, 2012	Unreleased	Unreleased	No	No
God of War Saga	God of War; God of War II; God of War III; Chains of Olympus^{†}; Ghost of Sparta^{†}	Santa Monica Studio; Ready at Dawn; Bluepoint Games	^{NA}August 28, 2012	Unreleased	Unreleased	August 28, 2012	Yes^{a}	No
Infamous Collection	Infamous; Infamous 2; Festival of Blood^{†}	Sucker Punch Productions	^{NA}August 28, 2012	Unreleased	September 26, 2012	August 28, 2012	No	Yes^{b}
Killzone Trilogy	Killzone HD; Killzone 2; Killzone 3	Guerrilla Games	^{NA}October 23, 2012	Unreleased	October 24, 2012	October 23, 2012	Yes^{c}	Yes^{c}
Mass Effect Trilogy	Mass Effect; Mass Effect 2; Mass Effect 3	BioWare	^{NA}December 4, 2012	Unreleased	December 7, 2012	December 4, 2012	No	No
Metal Gear Solid: The Legacy Collection	Metal Gear; Solid Snake; Metal Gear Solid^{†}; Metal Gear Solid: VR Missions^{†}; Sons of Liberty HD Edition; Snake Eater HD Edition; Guns of the Patriots; Peace Walker HD Edition	Kojima Productions	^{NA}July 9, 2013	July 11, 2013	September 13, 2013	July 9, 2013	No	No
Resistance Collection	Fall of Man; Resistance 2; Resistance 3	Insomniac Games	^{EU}November 16, 2012	Unreleased	November 16, 2012	December 5, 2012	Yes^{d}	Yes^{d}

^†Redeemable voucher download.

^a Only Chains of Olympus and Ghost of Sparta

^b Only Infamous: Festival of Blood

^c Only Killzone 3

^d Only Resistance 3

== See also ==
- New Play Control!
- List of PS one Classics (Japan)
- List of PS one Classics (North America)
- List of PS one Classics (PAL region)
- List of PlayStation 2 Classics for PlayStation 3
- List of video game remakes and remasters
