= Marianne Krawczyk =

American writer

- Born: United States
- Occupation: Writer
- Writing career
- Language: English
- Years active: 1994–present
- Genres: Screenwriting, video game writing

Marianne Krawczyk (/ˈkrɔːzɪk/; born June 24, 1964) is a screenwriter and video game writer. She wrote the screenplay for Appleseed Alpha (2014), based on the manga by Masamune Shirow and directed by Shinji Aramaki. Krawczyk is best known for writing the installments of the God of War video game franchise, from its start in 2005, until 2015. She won a BAFTA Game Award for Best Story and Character for her work on God of War II (2007).

== Video game writing ==
Krawczyk started her career serving as a co-dialogue writer on the game Area 51 (2005).

=== God of War series ===
While based at Sony in Santa Monica, Krawczyk wrote the first God of War (2005) game, and also wrote or helped write God of War II (2007), God of War: Betrayal (2007), God of War: Chains of Olympus (2008), God of War III (2010), God of War: Ghost of Sparta (2010), and God of War: Ascension (2013). For her writing work on God of War II, she was awarded a BAFTA Game Award for Best Story and Character, along with co-writers Cory Barlog and David Jaffe. At the 2011 WGA Awards, she and co-writers Stig Asmussen, Ariel Lawrence, and William Weissbaum were nominated for Video Game Writing Awards due to their writing work on God of War III. At the 2014 WGA Awards, she and co-writer Ariel Lawrence were nominated for "Outstanding Achievement in Writing: Video Game Writing" for their work on God of War: Ascension. She also helped write the graphic novel prequel story for God of War: Ascension called Rise of the Warrior.

Krawczyk also had a hand in writing the short series of novels collectively known as God of War: The Lost World, which ran in the game's official website in 2008, shortly prior to the release of God of War: Chains of Olympus, as part of a mini-game called 'The Temple of Helios'.

=== Other games ===
Krawczyk has also written The Sopranos: Road to Respect (2006), Shank (2010), Shank 2 (2012), Skylanders: Spyro's Adventure (2011), Star Trek (2013) and The Long Dark (2015). Krawczyk has written or helped write games in the Far Cry and Prince of Persia series (particularly serving as a story and dialogue editor in Prince of Persia: The Sands of Time), wrote Field Commander (2006), was a cinematic and dialogue writer for Untold Legends: The Warrior's Code, served as a researcher on L.A. Noire, and was a story consultant on Watch Dogs. She has also written for Knack 2.

== Screenwriting ==
Krawczyk also wrote the screenplay for the CG anime film Appleseed Alpha, based on the manga by Masamune Shirow and directed by Shinji Aramaki. The film was well-received upon its release in 2014. Krawczyk has also served as an assistant to producers for the TV show Sweet Valley High from 1994–1995.

== Miscellaneous ==
Krawczyk has also taught a Professional Program course in "Video Game Writing" at the UCLA School of Theater, Film and Television.
