= God of War video game collections =

Compilation of video game series

God of War is an action-adventure video game series, the first era of which was loosely based on Greek mythology. Debuting in 2005, the series became a flagship title for the PlayStation brand and the character Kratos is one of its most popular characters. The series consists of 10 games across multiple platforms; the first seven plus the 2026 title make up the Greek era of the series. Five of the Greek era games have been re-released through three separate compilations for the PlayStation 3 (PS3) platform: God of War Collection (2009), God of War: Origins Collection (2011), and God of War Saga (2012). With the exception of God of War III in the God of War Saga, each collection features remastered ports of the games that were not originally released on the PS3. God of War III was later remastered as God of War III Remastered and released on PlayStation 4 in July 2015. In February 2026, Sony announced God of War Trilogy Remake, consisting of full remakes of the first three entries of the Greek era; at the time of its announcement, it was in very early development for the PlayStation 5.

Each collection has been praised for how the games were remastered, as well as their price. IGN claimed that the God of War Collection was the "definitive way to play the game[s]". God of War Collection prompted Sony to make a new line of remastered games for the PlayStation 3 (which expanded to subsequent PlayStation consoles). Although the Origins Collection was criticized for its lack of new bonus content, IGN said that "Sony succeeded at making good games better". For the Saga, Digital Trends claimed it is "perhaps the best value buy for any console available".

== God of War Collection ==
God of War Collection
- North American PlayStation 3 box art
- Developer: Santa Monica Studio (Note: Additional development by Bluepoint Games for the PlayStation 3 and Sanzaru Games and Mercenary Technology for the PlayStation Vita)
- Publisher: Sony Computer Entertainment
- Series: God of War
- Engine: Bluepoint Engine
- Platforms: PlayStation 3 PlayStation Vita
- Release: PlayStation 3: NA: November 17, 2009; EU: April 28, 2010; AU: April 29, 2010; UK: April 30, 2010; PlayStation Vita: NA: May 6, 2014; EU: May 9, 2014; AU: May 14, 2014
- Genres: Action-adventure, hack and slash
- Mode: Single-player

God of War Collection is a remastered port of God of War and God of War II for the PlayStation 3 on a single Blu-ray Disc that was released in North America on November 17, 2009. It is the first game under Sony's line of "Classics HD". The collection was included in the God of War III Ultimate Trilogy Edition, released on March 18, 2010, in Australia and New Zealand, and on March 19 in Europe. It was released in Japan as a stand-alone on March 18, where it was distributed by Capcom, and was later released as part of the God of War III Trilogy Edition, which included God of War III and God of War Collection, on March 25. It was released as a stand-alone in Europe on April 28 (most countries), Australia on April 29, and in UK, Ireland, Germany and Austria on April 30. At the 2013 Electronic Entertainment Expo (E3), a PlayStation Vita version of God of War Collection was announced, and it was released on May 6, 2014, in North America, May 9 in Europe, May 14 in Australia, and May 15 in Japan.

God of War and God of War II were ported by Bluepoint Games and feature high-definition 720p anti-aliased graphics at 60 frames per second and Trophies. The bonus materials of the original two-disc PlayStation 2 version of God of War II are included with the Blu-ray version of the collection. The port was produced as a result of feedback from fans of the series and was viewed as a means of introducing new players to the series before God of War III was released. The God of War III game demo from E3 2009 was included with early copies of the collection. Sanzaru Games was responsible for porting the collection to the Vita.

Sony's Santa Monica Studio—the games' original developer—ran a sweepstakes in November 2009 for the release of God of War Collection. The grand prize was an autographed "Gold" disc, exclusive artwork created and signed by a God of War team member, a Limited Edition Kratos T-shirt, and a limited edition 10 inches (25 cm) figurine of Kratos. First place prize was a copy of God of War Collection signed by the development team. Winners were announced in December 2009.

On November 2, 2010, God of War Collection was released as a digital download on the PlayStation Store. PlayStation Plus subscribers could download a one-hour trial of each game. For a limited time, Plus subscribers received a God of War III skin with the purchase of each game: "Phantom of Chaos" (God of War) and "Forgotten Warrior" (God of War II), respectively. The bonus materials for God of War II were not included with the digital download version. Patch update version 1.01, released on September 5, 2012, allowed the PlayStation 3 version of God of War Collection to be played on the PlayStation Vita via the Remote Play function.

=== Reception ===
God of War Collection received critical acclaim from critics. Aggregating review websites GameRankings and Metacritic gave the PlayStation 3 version 90.78% based on 43 reviews and 91/100 based on 50 reviews and the PlayStation Vita version 75.00% based on 15 reviews and 73/100 based on 28 reviews.

The PlayStation 3 version received critical acclaim. IGN gave the game an "Editor's Choice" Award, praised the enhanced resolutions, lower price point, and smoother frame rates, and stated it was the "definitive way to play the game". 1UP.com noted the tremendous increase in visuals but said the in-engine cut-scenes appeared blurry. GamePro stated the collection is "two fantastic games on one disc for a low price; puts you in the right mindset for God of War 3". PlayStation LifeStyle (5/5) said "Those … familiar with Kratos will enjoy the extra polish the Collection brings to two of the best games from the PS2 era". Due to the success of God of War Collection, Sony announced that further titles would receive similar treatment for release under its new "Classics HD" brand. By June 2012, God of War Collection had sold more than 2.4 million copies worldwide, making it the eighteenth best-selling PlayStation 3 game of all time.

== God of War: Origins Collection ==
God of War: Origins Collection
- Developers: Ready at Dawn; Santa Monica Studio
- Publisher: Sony Computer Entertainment
- Series: God of War
- Platform: PlayStation 3
- Release: NA: September 13, 2011; EU: September 16, 2011; AU: September 29, 2011
- Genres: Action-adventure, hack and slash
- Mode: Single-player

God of War: Origins Collection (known as God of War Collection – Volume II in Europe and Australia) is a remastered port of the two PlayStation Portable installments in the series—Chains of Olympus and Ghost of Sparta—for the PlayStation 3 on a single Blu-ray Disc. It was announced at the Sony press conference at E3 2011 and was ported by Ready at Dawn, the developer of the PlayStation Portable games. The collection was released on September 13, 2011, in North America, September 16 in Europe, September 29 in Australia, and October 6 in Japan. God of War: Origins Collection was also released in North America as a digital download on the PlayStation Store on September 13.

God of War: Origins Collection features native 1080p high-definition video, anti-aliased graphics at 60 frames per second, DualShock 3 rumble features, Trophies, and is the only God of War release to feature Stereoscopic 3D. The God of War – Game Directors Live documentary, Kratos Legionnaire bonus skin, and Forest of the Forgotten combat arena (originally pre-order bonuses for Ghost of Sparta) are also included with the Origins Collection.

=== Reception ===
God of War: Origins Collection received positive reviews from critics. It received a score of 86.62% based on 41 reviews on GameRankings and 84/100 based on 58 reviews on Metacritic.

IGN stated, "Sony succeeded at making good games better" and that it "acts as a time lapse experiment for players to get a really good look at how a developer evolves from one game to another". GamePro noted the lack of new bonus content, and said, "3D doesn't necessarily radically redefine the experience. It does, however, make things like boss fights and magical effects much more mesmerizing", but added that, "all of the in-game cinematics are not in 3D, which is … unfortunate considering how cutscenes are such an integral part of the storytelling in any God of War game". By June 2012, God of War: Origins Collection had sold 711,737 copies worldwide.

== God of War Saga ==
God of War Saga
- Developers: Santa Monica Studio; Ready at Dawn; Bluepoint Games
- Publisher: Sony Computer Entertainment
- Series: God of War
- Platform: PlayStation 3
- Release: NA: August 28, 2012
- Genres: Action-adventure, hack and slash
- Mode: Single-player

God of War Saga is a collection of five of the God of War games for the PlayStation 3 released as part of Sony's PlayStation Collections line on August 28, 2012, in North America; it was not released elsewhere. The collection includes God of War, God of War II, God of War III, Chains of Olympus, and Ghost of Sparta. It features two Blu-ray Discs—God of War I and II on the first and III on the second—and a voucher to download Chains of Olympus and Ghost of Sparta. The games retain the same features as their first PS3 releases. The collection also includes exclusive bonus content and a voucher for a one-month trial of PlayStation Plus. The games, with the exception of God of War III, are also available to download from the PlayStation Store. From September 27 until October 5, 2012, to celebrate the release of God of War Saga, PlayStation.Blog ran a weekly countdown of the top five God of War epic moments as voted by the God of War Facebook community. "The Death of Ares" from the original God of War was voted as the "#1 most epic God of War moment of All Time".

In Latin America, an exclusive version of God of War Saga, titled God of War: Omega Collection, was released in November 2012. The Omega Collection features three Blu-ray discs, as opposed to two, with Chains of Olympus and Ghost of Sparta included on the third disc. It also includes a SteelBook game case with exclusive artwork and a limited edition bronze statue of Kratos, created by an Argentine artist.

=== Reception ===
Ryan Fleming of Digital Trends wrote that the collection "is perhaps the best value buy for any console available", and that for fans of the series, "this collection is not for you" as all games (with the exception of God of War III) are available for download, and it will "likely be redundant". However, new or inexperienced players should buy it. Fleming added that it was odd that the PSP games were included as downloads, and would like to have seen content migrate over to the PlayStation Vita. Jeffrey L. Wilson of PC Magazine gave the collection a 4 out of 5 and called it "an excellent purchase for anyone looking for cinematic, blood-drenched action—especially newcomers who get five titles for the price of one", but added that long time fans may not find much value in the collection.

== God of War Trilogy Remake ==
God of War Trilogy Remake is an upcoming collection consisting of full remakes of God of War (2005), God of War II (2007), and God of War III (2010). It was announced as of part of the franchise's 20th-anniversary year during Sony's State of Play presentation on February 12, 2026, by TC Carson; Carson, who was Kratos's original voice actor from the Greek games, will return to portray the character in the remake trilogy. At the time of the announcement, the game was in early development for the PlayStation 5.
