= Gerard Marino =

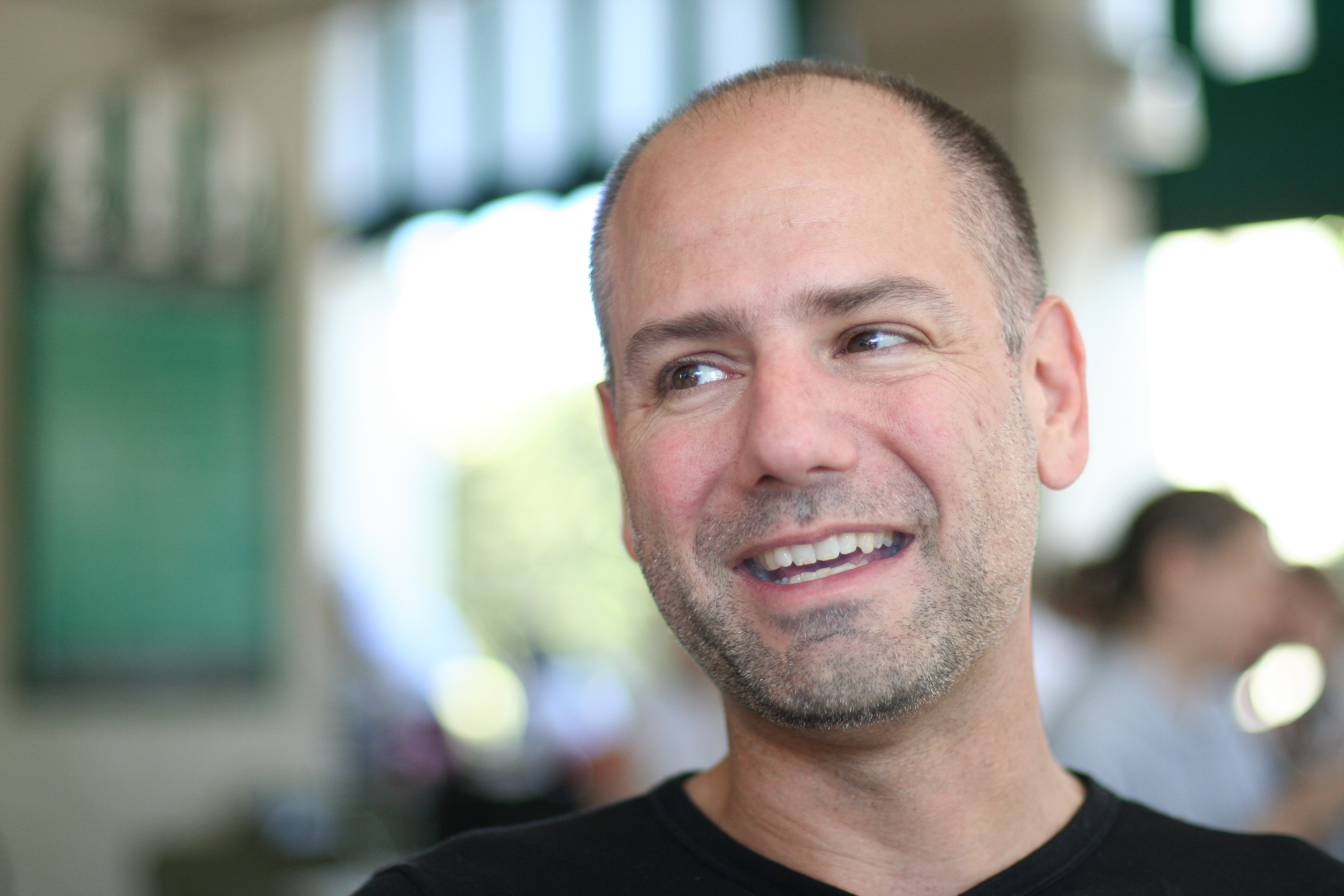
- Marino in 2010

Background information
- Born: Gerard Kendrick Marino; April 1, 1968 (age 57); United States
- Genres: Film score; video games; television
- Occupation: Composer

Gerard Kendrick Marino (born April 1, 1968) is a film and video game score composer, most notably contributing heavily to the Greek mythology-based games of the God of War series.

In the God of War series, his work is featured on the soundtracks of God of War (2005), God of War II (2007), God of War: Chains of Olympus (2008), God of War III, and God of War: Ghost of Sparta (both 2010). Bear McCreary, who took over as music composer beginning with 2018's God of War, which transitioned the series to Norse mythology, would make use of Marino's themes in God of War Ragnarök's (2022) downloadable content pack, Valhalla, which released in December 2023. For God of War II, Marino was nominated for a BAFTA Award. He also worked on Activision games, such as Gun, Spider-Man: Edge of Time, and The Amazing Spider-Man. He has also worked on several film and television series since 2000, generally listed as composing additional music for the soundtracks.
