= God of War: Ghost of Sparta =

2010 video game

- North American cover art
- Developer: Ready at Dawn (Note: Additional work by Santa Monica Studio.)
- Publisher: Sony Computer Entertainment
- Director: Dana Jan
- Programmers: Nicholas Baker; Jesse Van Beurden
- Writer: Cory Barlog
- Composers: Gerard K. Marino; Mike Reagan
- Series: God of War
- Platform: PlayStation Portable
- Release: NA: November 2, 2010; EU: November 3, 2010; AU: November 4, 2010; UK: November 5, 2010
- Genres: Action-adventure, hack and slash
- Mode: Single-player

God of War: Ghost of Sparta is a 2010 action-adventure game developed by Ready at Dawn and published by Sony Computer Entertainment (SCE). It was first released for the PlayStation Portable (PSP) handheld console on November 2, 2010. The game is the sixth installment in the God of War series and the fifth chronologically. Loosely based on Greek mythology, Ghost of Sparta is set in ancient Greece with vengeance as its central motif. The player controls the protagonist Kratos, the God of War. Kratos is still haunted by the visions of his mortal past and decides to explore his origins. In Atlantis, he finds his mother Callisto, who claims that his brother Deimos is still alive. Kratos journeys to the Domain of Death to rescue his brother. After initial resentment from Deimos, the brothers team up to battle the God of Death, Thanatos, Deimos' captor.

The gameplay is similar to that of the previous installments, and focuses on combo-based combat, achieved through the player's main weapon—the Blades of Athena—and a secondary weapon acquired later in the game. It features quick time events that require the player to complete various game controller actions in a timed sequence to defeat stronger enemies and bosses. Up to three magical attacks and a power-enhancing ability can be used as alternative combat options. Ghost of Sparta also features puzzles and platforming elements. The combat system was updated with significantly more gameplay elements than its previous PSP installment, God of War: Chains of Olympus.

Ghost of Sparta received praise from critics for its story, scope, and graphical illustration, though criticism was given for the general lack of gameplay innovation from its predecessor, Chains of Olympus. By June 2012, it had sold almost 3.2 million copies worldwide, making it the nineteenth best-selling PlayStation Portable game of all time. Together with Chains of Olympus, Ghost of Sparta was remastered and released on September 13, 2011, as part of the God of War: Origins Collection and the remastered version was re-released on August 28, 2012, as part of the God of War Saga, both for the PlayStation 3.

== Gameplay ==
The gameplay of God of War: Ghost of Sparta resembles that of the previous installments. It is a third-person single player video game viewed from a fixed camera perspective. The player controls the character Kratos in hack and slash combo-based combat, platforming, and puzzle game elements, and battles foes who primarily stem from Greek mythology, including minotaurs, cyclopes, harpies, Gorgons, and satyrs. The undead legionnaires, keres wraiths, geryons, automatons, Boreas beasts, and Triton warriors were influenced by the mythology, but created specifically for the game. Platforming elements require the player to climb walls, jump across chasms, swing on ropes, and balance across beams to proceed through sections of the game. Some puzzles are simple, such as moving a box so that the player can use it to access a pathway unreachable with normal jumping, but others are more complex, such as finding several items across different areas of the game to unlock one door. The game features new weapons, magical powers, and navigational abilities not present in previous games and has been cited as featuring 25 percent more gameplay than God of War: Chains of Olympus.

=== Combat ===
Kratos (left) battles Scylla. The L and R buttons at the top left and right indicate a quick time event (QTE): quickly alternating between the buttons will eventually release Kratos from Scylla's grasp.

Kratos' main weapons are the Blades of Athena, a pair of blades attached to chains that are wrapped around the character's wrists and forearms. In gameplay, the blades can be swung offensively in various maneuvers. Later in the game, Kratos acquires a new weapon, the Arms of Sparta—a spear and shield offering alternative combat options (e.g., Kratos can use the shield for defense and the spear for offense, such as throwing it at distant targets). Kratos gains a special ability, Thera's Bane, that infuses his blades with fire, and is similar to the Rage ability in previous games, providing increased attack damage that is strong enough to pierce through enemy armor. As with the Items in God of War III, this ability automatically replenishes itself (represented by the Fire meter), allowing further usage. Both the Arms of Sparta and Thera's Bane are used to overcome environmental obstacles (e.g., certain doors require the use of Thera's Bane to open). Kratos learns to use up to three magical abilities, including the Eye of Atlantis, Scourge of Erinys, and the Horn of Boreas, giving him a variety of ways to attack and kill enemies. The relic Poseidon's Trident is retained from the prior installment, which allows him to breathe underwater, a necessary ability as parts of the game require long periods of time there.

The combat system has been updated to allow Kratos to "pummel enemies to the ground as well as throw them", and perform air-to-air attacks. An "augmented death system" is also used, featuring specific weapon and magic death animations. This game's challenge mode is called the Challenge of the Gods, which features five Challenges of Ares, with an additional eight Challenges of Athena that can be unlocked. The challenge mode requires players to complete a series of specific tasks (e.g., kill all enemies without being attacked). A new mode exclusive to this game has been added called The Temple of Zeus, which allows players to sacrifice collected red orbs (from both in-game and the challenge mode) to unlock additional features, such as the Challenges of Athena, bonus costumes for Kratos, behind-the-scenes videos, and concept art of the characters and environments. Completing each difficulty level unlocks additional rewards. A Combat Arena (similar to the version in God of War III) allows players to pick adversaries and adjust the level of difficulty to improve their skills.

== Synopsis ==
=== Setting ===
As with previous games in the God of War franchise, God of War: Ghost of Sparta is set in an alternate version of ancient Greece populated by the Olympian gods, Titans, and other beings from Greek mythology. With the exception of flashbacks, the events are set between the games God of War (2005) and Betrayal (2007). Several locations are explored, including the fictional city of Atlantis (and later a sunken version). Atlantis is a mythical city erected by the Sea God Poseidon, and houses the Temple of Poseidon. Near the city is a real-world location, the Methana Volcano, which is contained by the archimedean screws and is also the prison of the Titan Thera, who is guarded by automatons. On the outskirts of the city is the Temple of the god Thanatos, the location of Death's Gate and portal to the Domain of Death. Other locations include the Island of Crete and its capital city, Heraklion, the Mounts of Aroania, the ancient city of Sparta (also home to the Temple of Ares), the Mounts of Laconia, and a brief scene above the city of Athens featuring Suicide Bluffs, the highest cliff in the city overlooking the Aegean Sea and a recurring location during Kratos' adventures.

=== Characters ===
The protagonist of the game is Kratos (voiced by Terrence C. Carson), the God of War after having killed the former, Ares (who appears in flashbacks and voiced by Steven Blum). Other characters include Athena (Erin Torpey), the Goddess of Wisdom who warns Kratos about exploring his past; Deimos (Mark Deklin), the younger brother of Kratos who is imprisoned and tortured in the Domain of Death; Thanatos (Arthur Burghardt), the God of Death and main antagonist; Callisto (Deanna Hurstold), the mother of Kratos and Deimos; Thera (Dee Dee Rescher), a Titan imprisoned beneath the Methana Volcano; and Erinys (Erin Torpey and Jennifer Hale), Thanatos' daughter. Minor characters include Lanaeus (Fred Tatasciore); a servant of Poseidon; King Midas (Fred Tatasciore), a king whose touch will turn anything to gold; the gravedigger (Paul Eiding), who warns Kratos to not alienate the gods; a loyal Spartan soldier (Gideon Emery); and Poseidon (Gideon Emery), the God of the Sea. Zeus (Fred Tatasciore), the King of the Gods, appears in the "Combat Arena" (bonus feature) after the player selects the gravedigger.

=== Plot ===
A series of flashbacks reveals that the oracle had foretold that the demise of Olympus would come not by the revenge of the Titans, who had been imprisoned after the Great War, but by a mortal, a marked warrior. The Olympians Zeus and Ares believed this warrior to be Deimos, (Note: First official appearance; Deimos was first referred to by Zeus as the "other one", and had a voice cameo in God of War III) the brother of Kratos, due to his strange birthmarks. Ares interrupted the childhood training of Kratos and Deimos, with Athena on hand, and kidnapped Deimos. Kratos attempted to stop Ares, but was swept aside and subsequently scarred across his right eye by the Olympian. Athena stopped Ares from killing Kratos, knowing his eventual destiny. Taken to Death's Domain, Deimos was imprisoned and tortured by Thanatos. In honor of his sibling, Kratos marked himself with a red tattoo, identical to his brother's birthmark.

Years later, when the game begins, Kratos has taken Ares' place as the new God of War on Mount Olympus. Still haunted by visions of his mortal past, Kratos decides against Athena's advice to explore his past and travels to the Temple of Poseidon, located within the city of Atlantis. The sea monster, Scylla, attacks and destroys Kratos' vessel off the coast of Atlantis, though the Spartan drives the beast off. After a series of skirmishes across the city, he eventually kills Scylla.

Reaching the temple, Kratos locates his mother, Callisto, who attempts to reveal the identity of his father. When Callisto is suddenly transformed into a hideous beast, Kratos is forced to battle her, and before dying, Callisto thanks him and beseeches him to seek out Deimos in Sparta. Prior to departure, Kratos encounters and frees the trapped Titan, Thera, which causes the eruption of the Methana Volcano, and subsequently destroys Atlantis. During his escape, he has another encounter (Note: As depicted in the first game) with the enigmatic gravedigger, who warns him of the consequences of alienating the gods.

Seeking clues about his brother Deimos, Kratos decides to reach his hometown Sparta. While traveling through the Aronian Pass, Kratos meets the goddess Erinys, daughter of Thanatos, who was searching for Kratos since the destruction of Atlantis. After a vicious battle, Kratos brutally kills Erinys and reaches Sparta, where he witnesses a group of Spartans tearing down a statue of Ares, intent on replacing it with one of Kratos. Kratos then chases a dissenter loyal to Ares into the Spartan Jails, who attempts to kill Kratos by releasing the Piraeus Lion. Defeating both foes, Kratos journeys to the Temple of Ares, where he encounters the spirit of his child self and learns that he must return to the now sunken Atlantis and locate the Domain of Death. Before leaving, a loyal Spartan provides him with his former weapons—used during Kratos' days as a Captain of the Spartan army—the Arms of Sparta. After returning to the sunken Atlantis, Kratos receives great resentment from Poseidon for sinking his beloved city.

Entering the Domain of Death, the Spartan frees his imprisoned brother. Enraged that Kratos had failed to rescue him sooner and stating he will never forgive him, Deimos attacks and overpowers Kratos. However, Thanatos, seeking revenge for Erinys' death at Kratos' hands, intervenes and takes a protesting Deimos to Suicide Bluffs (the site of Kratos' suicide attempt), where Kratos saves Deimos from falling to his death. A grateful Deimos then aids his brother in battling the god with the Arms of Sparta. At this point, Thanatos realizes Ares chose the wrong Spartan; it was Kratos who should have been taken, the "mark" being his red tattoo and the white ashes of his wife and child bound to his skin. Thanatos, however, kills Deimos, causing Kratos to fly into an uncontrollable rage out of grief and unleash his true power on Thanatos, allowing Kratos to finally destroy him. Remarking that his brother is finally free, Kratos places Deimos in his grave (leaving the Arms of Sparta as a grave marker), while the gravedigger states that Kratos has become "Death... the Destroyer of Worlds." Athena appears, begs for forgiveness, and offers full godhood for not revealing the truth, but Kratos ignores her and returns to Olympus, promising that "the gods will pay for this." As Kratos is seen leaving, Athena looks apologetically at Kratos and whispers out of his earshot, "Forgive me... brother." (Note: A foreshadowing of Kratos being revealed as a son of Zeus, as depicted in God of War II)

In a post-credits scene, the gravedigger places Callisto in a grave by Deimos (with an empty third grave nearby) and states "Now... only one remains." The final scene is a brooding Kratos sitting on his throne on Mount Olympus in his Olympian armor.

== Development ==
God of War: Ghost of Sparta was announced on May 4, 2010, on PlayStation.Blog. According to Sony, Ready at Dawn utilized "state-of-the-art visual technologies" that allowed "higher quality environments and characters." Ghost of Sparta offers "over 25% more gameplay" than its PSP predecessor, Chains of Olympus, while adding more enemies on screen and a greater number of boss encounters. Development of Ghost of Sparta took 23 months to complete. Chains of Olympus game director Ru Weerasuriya did not return to direct due to his busy schedule at Ready at Dawn, so Dana Jan, the lead level designer on Chains of Olympus, became director. At Comic-Con 2010, Jan noted that when development began in 2008, the goal was to make the game "bigger" than Chains of Olympus, which had "pushed" the PSP to its functional limits. Jan stated that Ghost of Sparta has taken the PSP to its "absolute capacity", with one additional feature being more on-screen foes. The game concept was originally used as a teaser for players who obtained the platinum trophy from God of War III. The trophy revealed a site called spartansstandtall.com—it initially featured a simple animation of torrential rain falling into a body of water and a Spartan shield encompassed by a meter on the screen. The meter was speculated to have been filled by players achieving the trophy and reaching the site. On May 4, 2010, the meter reached maximum and the site was updated for a final time, revealing an image of Kratos standing above a reflection and the logo for God of War: Ghost of Sparta, as the official site. On June 15, 2010, Sony displayed a cinematic trailer narrated by Linda Hunt during their 2010 Electronic Entertainment Expo (E3) Press Conference.

Artwork of Kratos' brother Deimos

Dana Jan stated the reason they chose to have the game take place between God of War and God of War II was because "It seemed to make a lot of sense to fill in that void." Jan said with some scenes, "the team wasn't sure how gamers would react" because "God of War usually doesn't slow...down" and the team "worried if these scenes would be captivating enough to keep player interested and still feel like God of War." For puzzles, Jan stated that they tried to make the outcomes unexpected because players assume that they will have to "push something, carry a body or smash something with [the] blades." Hinting at a possible future installment from Ready at Dawn, Jan stated that he is "intrigued" by the flashbacks in God of War and God of War II and that "There's definitely a back story to Kratos that nobody's touched on." For the character Deimos, Jan stated that the first reference was actually in the Chains of Olympus finale. In the game, Helios states "Do you think that they'll survive?" and Athena says "They must." Jan said that this line was "purposefully put" in that game and that there are also references to Deimos in God of War III. He confirmed that Kratos and Deimos are not twins and that while Kratos' father is Zeus, "Deimos' father is more of a mystery." He confirmed that a character named Dominus appears in the game (Kratos' original name) and "the scene featuring a soldier named Dominus was a nod to that." He also stated that he does not know where God of War: Betrayal fits chronologically in the series.

Several voice actors returned to reprise their roles from previous installments, including Terrence C. Carson, Erin Torpey, Gideon Emery, Steven Blum, Paul Eiding, and Linda Hunt, who voiced Kratos, Athena, Poseidon, Ares, the gravedigger, and the narrator, respectively. Actors Mark Deklin, Deanne Hurstold, and Arthur Burghardt voiced the characters of Deimos, Callisto and Thanatos, respectively. During flashbacks to Kratos' childhood, Antony Del Rio, Bridger Zadina, and Jennifer Hale provided the respective voices of Kratos, Deimos, and Callisto. Both Erin Torpey and Jennifer Hale voiced the character Erinys via overdubbed voices. Josh Keaton, who had previously voiced the loyal Spartan soldier (credited as the Last Spartan), did not return to reprise the role, and as such, Gideon Emery voiced the character in addition to Poseidon. Series veteran Fred Tatasciore voiced the characters Lanaeus, King Midas, and the minor role of Zeus. The voice directors were Kris Zimmerman and Gordon Hunt.

== Release ==
The demo for God of War: Ghost of Sparta was available for play at Sony's E3 2010 booth to attendees of the event. The 15-minute sequence pits Kratos against various sea and land enemies, including the main opponent Scylla, a sea monster. The sequence also features Kratos using a new weapon, "Arms of Sparta" (a spear and shield), and the magical attack "Eye of Atlantis." On September 3, 2010, Ready at Dawn emailed registrants of GodofWar.com and SpartansStandTall.com a voucher for the demo and on September 7, PlayStation Plus members received early access to it. On September 28, the demo was made available to all PlayStation Network (PSN) members to download from the PlayStation Store.

The game was released in North America on November 2, 2010, in mainland Europe on November 3, in Australia and New Zealand on November 4, and in the United Kingdom and Ireland on November 5. By June 2012, God of War: Ghost of Sparta had sold almost 1.2 million copies worldwide. Together with God of War: Chains of Olympus, the game was released as part of the God of War: Origins Collection on September 13, 2011, in North America and September 16 in Europe. The collection is a remastered port of both games to the PlayStation 3, with features including high-definition resolution, stereoscopic 3D, anti-aliased graphics locked in at 60 frames per second, DualShock 3 vibration function, and Trophies. God of War: Origins Collection was also released to download on the PlayStation Store on September 13 in North America (including full game trials of both games). By June 2012, God of War: Origins Collection had sold 711,737 copies worldwide. On August 28, 2012, God of War Collection, God of War III, and Origins Collection were released as part of the God of War Saga under Sony's line of PlayStation Collections for the PlayStation 3 in North America.

=== Marketing ===
As a pre-order bonus at select retailers, players received exclusive downloadable content (DLC) available via the PlayStation Network. The content included the original soundtrack, a Ghost of Sparta PSP XrossMediaBar (XMB) theme, a PS3 dynamic XMB theme ("Palace of Hades"), a PSN Avatar, a Legionnaire Skin for use in-game, and an exclusive documentary, God of War – Game Directors Live. PSPgo owners received the pre-order items by purchasing the game between November 2 and 23, 2010, on the PlayStation Store. GameStop offered an exclusive Challenge arena, "The Forest of the Forgotten", in addition to the other bonuses.

Ghost of Sparta was also available in a special limited edition PSP bundle pack, which included the game, a voucher to download Chains of Olympus, a UMD of the 2010 film Kick-Ass, a 2 GB Memory Stick Pro Duo, and a special black and red two-toned PSP-3000. For a limited time, specially marked packages included a voucher enabling a download of the "Deimos Skin" for use in God of War III. The Deimos Skin was available in the PSP bundle pack, and PSPgo owners received the bonus skin with the pre-order items. In Europe, the Deimos Skin can still be obtained by purchasing Ghost of Sparta from the PlayStation Store.

== Soundtrack ==
God of War: Ghost of Sparta – Original Soundtrack from the Video Game

Soundtrack album by Gerard K. Marino and Mike Reagan
- Released: October 18, 2010
- Genre: Contemporary classical music
- Length: 41:08
- Label: Sony Computer Entertainment

God of War: Ghost of Sparta – Original Soundtrack from the Video Game—composed by Gerard K. Marino and Mike Reagan—was released on iTunes on October 18, 2010, by Sony Computer Entertainment and includes three bonus tracks from Chains of Olympus. It was also included as downloadable content in the Ghost of Sparta pre-order package. Square Enix Music Online (8/10) stated that several tracks were intended for purely contextual purposes, with the remainder of the soundtrack rating well in comparison to the soundtracks of the main installments in the series.

Track listing
| No. | Title | Music | Length |
|---|---|---|---|
| 1. | "Atlantis" | Mike Reagan | 3:09 |
| 2. | "Deimos" | Gerard Marino | 2:05 |
| 3. | "The Caldera" | Reagan | 3:17 |
| 4. | "Battle with the Scylla" | Reagan | 1:34 |
| 5. | "City of Ashes" | Marino | 2:44 |
| 6. | "Aroania Mountains" | Reagan | 3:09 |
| 7. | "Daughter of Death" | Marino | 1:44 |
| 8. | "Ghost of Sparta" | Reagan | 3:00 |
| 9. | "The Brother" | Marino | 1:54 |
| 10. | "Canyons of Sorrow" | Marino | 3:10 |
| 11. | "The Fallen Brother" | Marino | 2:49 |
| 12. | "Death's Domain" | Reagan | 3:21 |
| 13. | "Deimos' Revenge" | Marino | 1:36 |
| 14. | "Brothers in Arms" | Marino | 1:21 |
| 15. | "Calliope" (Bonus Track) | Marino | 2:53 |
| 16. | "The Wrath of Charon" (Bonus Track) | Marino | 1:57 |
| 17. | "Persian Combat" (Bonus Track) | Marino | 1:37 |
| Total length: | | | 41:08 |

== Reception ==
Reception

Aggregate score
| Aggregator | Score |
|---|---|
| Metacritic | 86/100 |

Review scores
| Publication | Score |
|---|---|
| 1Up.com | A− |
| Eurogamer | 7/10 |
| Game Informer | 9.5 |
| GameTrailers | 9.4/10 |
| IGN | 9.5 |
| Joystiq | 4.5/5 |
| PlayStation: The Official Magazine | 10/10 |

God of War: Ghost of Sparta received "generally favourable reviews", according to review aggregator website Metacritic. Nicole Tanner of IGN stated that in terms of gameplay, "there's nothing unique here, but that's not a bad thing." 1UP's Chris Pereira said that the controls are "largely the same" as Chains of Olympus, but it "is still an extremely well-paced action game." He said that it is put together so well that it is worth playing, "unless you've become truly tired of the franchise". Joystiq's Randy Nelson stated that the scope of the game seems like it "was planned for release on consoles", but "if you were hoping for something really innovative, you're out of luck." Joe Juba of Game Informer stated that "the other core fighting mechanics are familiar, but the tweaks go a long way toward improving gameplay". PlayStation: The Official Magazine stated "[Ghost of] Sparta offers an immersive experience on par with many of the best PS3 games". Simon Parkin of Eurogamer praised the battle system as strong, however, he stated "There is a sense that Ghost of Sparta is a step back for the series" and claimed that it is "best enjoyed by newcomers" or "those yet to play" God of War III.

Praising its story, Pereira claimed that it is "a more personal story than the other GOW games, but one that still features the series' signature trademarks", and also said that the sex mini-game is "arguably the most over-the-top of the bunch". Nelson stated that it is "a game that upholds the standard of quality in gameplay, storytelling and sheer wow factor of the series, while also—like Metal Gear Solid: Peace Walker before it—blurring the lines between portable and console experiences with its amazing presentation." Juba said that it "doesn't have any mind-blowing moments", but "this isn't an optional side-story; Ghost of Sparta is a must-play for God of War fans." GameTrailers said it has a "pretty cool story" that will "definitely feel familiar". Parkin, however, stated the "game's primary problem...is in its in-built focus" and that the series "is principally concerned with endlessly upping the ante." He also claimed that the developers have "[taken] away the sense of wonder" that is expected of a God of War game and stated "the remaining components struggle to carry the experience."

In terms of visuals, Tanner stated that the graphics are "better than a big chunk of PS2 games" and that it is the "best-looking game on the PSP thus far." Pereira said that it looks as good if not better than other handheld games available. Nelson said the graphics are "the best you've ever seen on a handheld." He also said that it makes the first two God of War games on the PlayStation 2 look dated. GameTrailers said "you'll be treated to the very best visuals the PSP has to offer". Parkin described the set-pieces as "incredible" for a handheld platform, however, he stated they "seem tired" in comparison to the opening scenes of God of War III.

=== Awards and accolades ===
At E3 2010, Ghost of Sparta received nine awards, including "Best Handheld Game", "Best PSP Game", and "PSP Game of Show" from several media outlets, as well as three nominations. PlayStation: The Official Magazine awarded it the "Gold Award". Kotaku awarded it "Editor's Choice", stating "God of War: Ghost of Sparta is a palm-sized epic video game." At the 2010 Spike Video Game Awards, it received "Best Handheld Game". At the 2011 British Academy of Film and Television Arts (BAFTA) Video Game Awards, Ghost of Sparta was a nominee for the "Handheld" award. During the 14th Annual Interactive Achievement Awards (now known as the D.I.C.E. Awards), the Academy of Interactive Arts & Sciences awarded Ghost of Sparta with "Portable Game of the Year".
