= Legend of Kay =

2005 video game

- Developers: Neon Studios; Firehazard Studio (DS); Kaiko (Anniversary)
- Publishers: PAL: JoWooD Productions; NA: Capcom Entertainment (PS2); NA: DreamCatcher Games (NDS); WW: Nordic Games (Wii U, PS4, PS3, Xbox 360, PC); WW: THQ Nordic (Switch)
- Directors: Jan Jöckel; Pete Walentin
- Producers: Neil Soane (original); Thorsten Röpke (Anniversary)
- Designer: Antony Christoulakis
- Programmer: Peter Thierolf
- Artists: Antony Christoulakis; Jonas D Christian Wagner; Yu-Chung Chen (original); Daniel Amend; Stella Behrendt; Benjamin Sauer (Anniversary)
- Writers: Noah Falstein; Kenneth Melville; Pete Walentin
- Composer: Jake Kaufman
- Engine: RenderWare
- Platforms: PlayStation 2, Nintendo DS, PlayStation 3, PlayStation 4, Wii U, Microsoft Windows, OS X, Xbox 360, Nintendo Switch
- Release: PlayStation 2: GER: February 4, 2005; UK: March 11, 2005; NA: September 20, 2005; Nintendo DS: EU: May 28, 2010; NA: June 14, 2010; AU: August 26, 2010; Windows, OS X, PS3, PS4, Wii U, X360: WW: July 28, 2015; Nintendo Switch: WW: May 29, 2018
- Genres: Action-adventure, platformer (PS2); Stealth, platform (NDS)
- Mode: Single-player

Legend of Kay is a 2005 action-adventure platform video game developed by Neon Studios and published by JoWood Productions for the PlayStation 2. An abridged version of the game for the Nintendo DS by Firehazard Studio was released in 2010.

An enhanced version with visual and gameplay improvements was released as Legend of Kay Anniversary on modern consoles and PC by Nordic Games after they purchased JoWood's assets.

== Plot ==
For many generations, the mystical land of Yenching had been inhabited by many animals, mainly cats, hares, frogs, and pandas. Because of a religious code called The Way, these four races had prospered throughout the ages in their own separate towns. But as the years passed, the younger generations began to defect from The Way. Ultimately, with no protective code to guide the races, Yenching was invaded by the Gorillas and the Rats (known as the Din), led by Gorilla Minister Shun and Tak, the Rat Alchemist. Minister Shun now rules the majority of Yenching with an iron fist, and is said to reside in the volcanic mountain of Waa-Lo.

The story now focuses around a figure named Kay. Kay is a hotheaded young cat, and the Master's finest martial arts student. Like many of the people of the races, Kay does not believe in The Way, and likes to focus on physical skills and strength. This is what makes his friend, Su Ling, leave his town in disgust, hoping to find another town that would share her belief in resurrecting The Way. One day, in Kay's martial arts school, Shun's gorillas and the mayor of Kay's town declare that they must shut down the school because new 'Din schools' must soon be erected in the town, although the suspected reason is that the hierarchy wants to prevent potential threats. Kay is outraged, and even more so when his Master simply agrees to the new terms. And so, making up his mind, Kay sneaks into his Master's house at night (the Master is drunk, and asleep) and steals the mystical blade the Master keeps. Kay then jumps out of the town walls, and makes his way into the wilderness.

Kay's exploits vary from traversing to the Haretree (the secret residence of all the hares of Yenching), befriending a dragon (and almost getting fried in the process), traveling through dangerous swamps in order to reach Frog City (the city of frogs, obviously), and riding on a dragon to get to the Forbidden City (the city of pandas, located on a plateau), all the while defeating hordes of rats, crocodiles, turtles, bears, ladybugs, and gorillas. There, in the Forbidden City, Kay finds his friend, Su Ling, who is now a ringleader of the Avalanche, a group of pandas who are dedicated to the revival of The Way and stopping Shun & the army of Din. After helping them out, the Avalanche begins its voyage to the island of Waa-Lo, with Kay in tow. After an arduous voyage, Kay and the Avalanche begin to explore the caves of Waa-Lo, making their way to the center of the volcano. During the expedition, Kay finally catches up with Tak, the rat alchemist. After defeating him, Kay meets Shun in person. The two engage in a fierce duel, with Kay being the victor. Injured, Shun runs to the contraption he and Tak created. The fires of Waa-Lo power up the machine, and begin to fuse Shun and one of his bodyguards into a single, monstrous ape-like entity. With no choice left but to fight, Kay begins to do battle with the monster. As Kay strikes the final blow, Waa-Lo begins to erupt. Luckily, the Avalanche sends a rescue team, via a hot air balloon.

As Kay, Su Ling, and the Avalanche (all back in the ship) stare across the horizon at the exploding volcano, the merchant (who the pandas have seemingly saved) tries to sell some souvenirs to Kay and Su Ling. With a grin, Kay pulls off the merchant's rice hat to reveal the Master himself. Kay jokes about finally having to master his abilities by outfoxing his master. Kay, Su Ling, and the Master all then begin to laugh, the ship returning for a free Yenching.

== Remaster ==
Legend of Kay Anniversary, a version of the game with improved graphics and online leaderboards for players to compare scores, was released on Windows, OS X, Xbox 360, PlayStation 3, PlayStation 4, and Wii U on July 28, 2015. It was later ported to the Nintendo Switch on May 29, 2018.

== Reception ==
Reception

Aggregate scores
Aggregator	Score
GameRankings	(PS2) 76% (DS) 41%
Metacritic	(PS2) 72/100

Review scores
Publication	Score
Edge	6/10
Game Informer	6.5/10
GameSpot	8/10
GameZone	7.6/10
IGN	7.5/10
Nintendo Life	(NS) 5/10
Official U.S. PlayStation Magazine	3/5
X-Play	4/5

The PlayStation 2 version of Legend of Kay received an average aggregate score of 72/100 on Metacritic, while the DS version received "unfavorable" reviews on GameRankings.

The remaster, Legend of Kay Anniversary, received an aggregate score of 54/100 on Metacritic. Dom Reseigh-Lincoln of Nintendo Life called the Switch version of the game an "unremarkable experience", and said that while it was graphically the best version of the game, camera issues were not fixed from the original, and the game had "abysmal" voice acting, with dated gameplay compared to competitors on the same platform such as Super Mario Odyssey.
