= God of War: Chains of Olympus =

2008 video game

- North American box art
- Developer: Ready at Dawn (Note: Additional work by Santa Monica Studio.)
- Publisher: Sony Computer Entertainment
- Director: Ru Weerasuriya
- Writers: Marianne Krawczyk; Ru Weerasuriya; Marc Turndorf; Cory Barlog
- Composer: Gerard K. Marino
- Series: God of War
- Platform: PlayStation Portable
- Release: NA: March 4, 2008; AU: March 27, 2008; EU: March 28, 2008
- Genres: Action-adventure, hack and slash
- Mode: Single-player

God of War: Chains of Olympus is a 2008 action-adventure game developed by Ready at Dawn, and published by Sony Computer Entertainment (SCE). It was first released for the PlayStation Portable (PSP) handheld console on March 4, 2008. The game is the fourth installment in the God of War series, the third chronologically, and a prequel to the original God of War. It is loosely based on Greek mythology and set in ancient Greece, with vengeance as its central motif. The player controls Kratos, a Spartan warrior who serves the Olympian gods. Kratos is guided by the goddess Athena, who instructs him to find the Sun God Helios, as the Dream God Morpheus has caused many of the gods to slumber in Helios' absence. With the power of the Sun and the aid of the Titan Atlas, Morpheus and the Queen of the Underworld Persephone intend to destroy the Pillar of the World and in turn Olympus.

The gameplay is similar to the previous installments, with a focus on combo-based combat, achieved through the player's main weapon—the Blades of Chaos—and secondary weapons acquired throughout the game. It features quick time events that require the player to complete game controller actions in a timed sequence to defeat stronger enemies and bosses. The player can use up to three magical attacks as alternative combat options. The game also features puzzles and platforming elements. The series' control scheme was reconfigured to compensate for the smaller number of buttons on the PSP compared to the PlayStation 2's controller; Ready at Dawn's solutions for the controls were praised by critics.

Chains of Olympus was acclaimed by critics, and is the highest-rated PSP title on Metacritic. As of June 2012, the game has sold 3.2 million copies worldwide, making it one of the best-selling PlayStation Portable games of all time. Together with 2010's God of War: Ghost of Sparta, Chains of Olympus was remastered and released on September 13, 2011, as part of the God of War: Origins Collection for the PlayStation 3. The remastered version was included in the God of War Saga released on August 28, 2012, also for PlayStation 3.

== Gameplay ==
God of War: Chains of Olympus is a third-person single-player video game viewed from a fixed camera perspective. The player controls the character Kratos in combo-based combat, platforming, and puzzle game elements, and battles foes who primarily stem from Greek mythology, including cyclopes, Gorgons, satyrs, harpies, minotaurs, hoplites, and sphinxes. Morpheus beasts, shades, banshees, fire guards, fire sentries, hyperion guards, and death knights were created specifically for the game. Platforming elements require the player to climb walls, jump across chasms, swing on ropes, and balance across beams to proceed through sections of the game. Some puzzles are simple, such as moving a box so that the player can use it as a jumping-off point to access a pathway unreachable with normal jumping, but others are more complex, such as finding several items across different areas of the game to unlock one door.

=== Combat ===
Kratos' main weapon is the Blades of Chaos: a pair of blades attached to chains that are wrapped around the character's wrists and forearms. In gameplay, the blades can be swung offensively in various maneuvers. As the game progresses, Kratos acquires new weapons—the Sun Shield and Gauntlet of Zeus—offering alternative combat options. Kratos only learns three magical abilities, as opposed to four in previous installments, including the Efreet, the Light of Dawn, and Charon's Wrath, giving him a variety of ways to attack and kill enemies. He acquires the relic Triton's Lance—similar to Poseidon's Trident in God of War— which allows him to breathe underwater; a necessary ability as parts of the game require long periods of time there.

The challenge mode in this game is called the Challenge of Hades (five trials), and requires players to complete a series of specific tasks (e.g., Burn 50 soldiers with the Efreet). It is unlocked by completing the game. The player may unlock bonus costumes for Kratos, behind-the-scenes videos, and concept art of the characters and environments, as rewards. Completion of each of the game's difficulty levels unlocks additional rewards.

== Synopsis ==
=== Setting ===
As with the previous games in the God of War franchise, God of War: Chains of Olympus is set in an alternate version of ancient Greece, populated by the Olympian gods, Titans, and other beings of Greek mythology. With the exception of flashbacks, the events are set between those of the games Ascension (2013) and God of War (2005). Several locations are explored, including the real-world locations of the ancient cities of Attica and Marathon, the latter including fictional settings of the Temple of Helios and the Caves of Olympus, and several other fictional locations, including the Underworld, which features scenes at the River Styx, Tartarus, the Fields of Elysium, and the Temple of Persephone.

Attica is a war-torn city under assault by the Persian Empire and their pet basilisk and is the site of Eurybiades' last battle. The city of Marathon is covered in the black fog of the Dream God, Morpheus. Just beyond the city is the Temple of Helios, which sits atop the Sun Chariot, which has plummeted to Earth in Helios' absence. Boreas, Zephyros, Euros, and Notos, the gods of the north, west, east, and south winds, respectively, reside in the temple and guide the chariot. The Caves of Olympus is a cavern below Mount Olympus and houses the dawn-goddess Eos, the Primordial Fires, and a statue of Triton. The Underworld is the underground realm of the dead and is host to the River Styx and the ferryman of the dead, Charon. Tartarus is the prison of the dead and the Titans where the massive Titan Hyperion is chained. The Fields of Elysium are home to deserving souls that roam peacefully and are overlooked by the Temple of Persephone.

=== Characters ===
The protagonist of the game is Kratos (voiced by Terrence C. Carson), a former Captain of Sparta's Army, and once servant to the God of War, Ares. He now serves the other Olympian gods in hopes that they will free him of his nightmares. Other characters include Kratos' mentor and ally Athena (Erin Torpey), the Goddess of Wisdom; Eos (Erin Torpey), the Goddess of Dawn and sister of Helios; Persephone (Marina Gordon), the Queen of the Underworld and the main antagonist; and Atlas (Fred Tatasciore), a four-armed Titan imprisoned in Tartarus after the Great War. Kratos' deceased daughter Calliope (Debi Derryberry) briefly reunites with him in the Fields of Elysium and his wife Lysandra appears in a flashback. Minor characters include Helios (Dwight Schultz), the captured Sun God; Charon (Dwight Schultz), the ferryman of the Underworld; and the Persian king (Fred Tatasciore), leader of the Persian forces attacking Attica. The Dream God Morpheus is an unseen character that affects the plot.

=== Plot ===
Kratos battles the basilisk in the city of Attica.

About halfway through Kratos' ten years of service to the Olympian gods, he is sent to the city of Attica to help defend it from the invading Persian army. After successfully killing the Persian king, decimating his army, and slaying their pet basilisk, Kratos observes the Sun fall from the sky, plunging the world into darkness. As he fights his way through the city of Marathon, the Spartan witnesses the black fog of Morpheus covering the land. He hears a haunting flute melody, which he recognizes as a melody once played by his deceased daughter Calliope. Finding the Temple of Helios, Kratos learns from Athena that Morpheus has caused many of the gods to fall into a deep slumber due to the absence of light. Before she succumbs to slumber, Athena tasks Kratos to find Helios, return him to the sky, and break Morpheus’ grasp on the world. The Spartan eventually locates Helios' sister, Eos, who tells Kratos that the Titan Atlas has abducted her brother. Eos advises Kratos to seek the Primordial Fires, which he uses to awaken the fire steeds of Helios. The steeds take the Spartan to the Underworld, where he has two encounters with Charon at the River Styx. Although Charon initially defeats Kratos and banishes him to Tartarus, the Spartan returns with the Gauntlet of Zeus and destroys the ferryman.

Kratos soon spots Calliope and chases after her. After locating the Temple of Persephone and confronting the Queen of the Underworld, Kratos is given a choice: renounce his power and be with his deceased daughter (at a cost to mankind) or proceed with his mission. Kratos sacrifices his weapons and power to be reunited with his daughter but discovers that Persephone is embittered by Zeus' betrayal and her imprisonment in the Underworld with her husband Hades, whom she did not love. While he was distracted by his reunion with Calliope, Persephone's ally Atlas was using the power of the kidnapped Helios to destroy the Pillar of the World, which would also end Olympus. As the resulting destruction of the Pillar will also cause the souls of the Underworld, including Calliope, to be lost, Kratos reluctantly abandons his daughter forever in order to save her life. Taking back his power, Kratos battles Persephone and Atlas, binding the Titan to the Pillar before slaying the goddess. Although victorious, he is warned by a dying Persephone that his suffering will never end. Atlas, forced to hold the weight of the world on his shoulders for eternity, also warns Kratos that he will eventually regret helping the gods and that he and Atlas will meet again. (Note: As depicted in God of War II.) Kratos then rides the Sun Chariot back to the mortal world and into the sky as Morpheus retreats.

In a post-credits scene, Kratos is still riding Helios' chariot back into the sky and after seeing the return of the Sun, Kratos loses consciousness from the exertion and plummets to the ground. At the last moment, Kratos is saved by Athena and Helios, and Athena tells Helios that "He will live."

== Development ==
Game developer Ready at Dawn pitched the idea for a PlayStation Portable version of God of War to Santa Monica Studio soon after the original God of War launched. This would be the first installment in the series to not be developed primarily by Santa Monica, although the studio provided assistance. In February 2007, Ready at Dawn posted a teaser featuring "Coming Soon" in the God of War font. An editor from 1UP obtained an early copy of God of War II and posted the game's instruction manual, featuring a one-page teaser with "PSP" in the Omega symbol and stating "Coming 2007". On March 12, 2007, God of War II was launched at the Metreon: its Game Director Cory Barlog officially confirmed the development of Chains of Olympus, stating "It is its own story that connects to the overall story. God of War, God of War II, and then if all the stars align God of War III will be the telling of a trilogy. This PSP story will be a further fleshing out". An initial trailer for Chains of Olympus was released on April 25, 2007, coinciding with the announcement of a demo on UMD—the optical disc medium for the PSP. The trailer was narrated by voice actress Linda Hunt.

God of War: Chains of Olympus uses a proprietary, in-house engine referred to as the Ready at Dawn engine, which expanded on the engine created for their previous game, Daxter (2006), to include a fluid and cloth simulator. The camera system was modified to cater to the fixed cinematic camera for God of War gameplay, and the lighting system was reworked to aid in presenting realistic graphics. The game was originally designed for the PlayStation Portable's restricted 222 megahertz (MHz) processor. Ready at Dawn repeatedly contacted Sony regarding increasing the clock speed of the PSP on account of the difference to the game and had developed a version of the game with higher speed. Sony released a firmware upgrade that allowed games to use the full 333 MHz processor. The faster processor allowed for more realistic blood effects, lighting effects, and shadows as well as improved enemy intelligence. The upgrade, however, noticeably decreased battery life. Furthermore, seamless loading was a challenge due to the PSP's hardware limitations. Ready at Dawn solved this by having a movie file of Daxter's opening cinematic running in the background. After the game's completion, Game Director Ru Weerasuriya stated multiplayer options and other puzzles, characters, and dialogue had to be removed due to time constraints.

=== Audio ===
Two of the voice actors returned from the previous installments to reprise their roles, which were Terrence C. Carson and Linda Hunt, who voiced Kratos and the narrator respectively. Erin Torpey adopted the dual roles of Athena and Eos. Fred Tatasciore, who voiced different characters in previous installments, returned, and in this game, voiced both Atlas and the Persian King. Carole Ruggier and Michael Clarke Duncan did not return to reprise their roles, which were Athena and Atlas respectively. Voice actor Dwight Schultz voiced both Charon and Helios; Debi Derryberry voiced Calliope and continued this role in a later installment; and Marina Gordon provided the voice of Persephone. Brian Kimmet, Don Luce, and Andrew Wheeler provided the voices of several minor characters and Keythe Farley was the Voice Director.

The soundtrack was composed by Gerard K. Marino, but was never commercially released. After the release of the demo disc, Ready at Dawn offered pre-order customers a music track on disc titled "Battle of Attica". Composer Gerard Marino stated that it was the first cue written for the game, based on concept art and screenshots. Marino composed roughly thirteen minutes of music for the game and re-worked other music from the previous titles. Three tracks from the soundtrack are included as bonus tracks on the God of War: Ghost of Sparta soundtrack.

== Release ==
The demo disc, officially titled God of War: Chains of Olympus – Special Edition: Battle of Attica, was released on September 27, 2007. In the demo, Kratos battles Persian soldiers and a giant basilisk. The demo progresses through the city of Attica as Kratos chases the basilisk, culminating with Kratos fighting the Persian King. The disc also included a developer video and a lanyard in the shape of the Greek letter Omega. Following the demo's release, a downloadable version was made available through the PlayStation Store in North American and European regions. Due to the delay of the game, Ready at Dawn offered a "special edition" version of the demo to pre-order customers, with one Ready at Dawn developer stating that preparation of the special demo disc took up to 40% of the team's production time.

God of War: Chains of Olympus was originally scheduled to be released during the fourth quarter of 2007, but it was rescheduled and released on March 4, 2008, in North America, March 27 in Australia, March 28 in Europe, and July 10 in Japan, where it was published by Capcom. The game was a commercial success, debuting at No. 5 on the North American charts with 340,500 copies sold in the first month. The game was re-released in Europe on October 17, 2008, as part of Sony's Platinum Range and was also re-released in Japan and North America in April 2009 under Capcom's Best Price and Sony's Greatest Hits labels, respectively. It became available for download from the PlayStation Store on September 30, 2009, in North America, October 1 in Europe, and November 11, 2010, in Japan. Sony released a limited-edition bundle pack only in North America, on June 3, 2008. The pack included the game, a UMD of the 2007 film Superbad, a voucher for the PSP title Syphon Filter: Combat Ops, and a red edition of the console imprinted with an image of Kratos' face on the rear. As of June 2012, Chains of Olympus has sold more than 3.2 million copies worldwide.

Together with God of War: Ghost of Sparta, the game was released for the PlayStation 3 as part of the God of War: Origins Collection (called God of War Collection – Volume II in Europe) on September 13, 2011, in North America, September 16 in Europe, September 29 in Australia, and October 6 in Japan. The collection is a remastered port of both games to the PS3 hardware, with features including high-definition resolution, stereoscopic 3D, anti-aliased graphics locked at 60 frames per second, DualShock 3 vibration function, and PlayStation 3 Trophies. God of War: Origins Collection and full trials of its two games were also released for download on the PlayStation Store on September 13, 2011, in North America. By June 2012, the collection had sold 711,737 copies worldwide. On August 28, 2012, God of War Collection, God of War III, and Origins Collection were released as part of the God of War Saga under Sony's line of PlayStation Collections for the PlayStation 3 in North America.

== Reception ==
Reception

Aggregate score
Aggregator	Score
Metacritic	91/100

Review scores
Publication	Score
1Up.com	A
Eurogamer	8/10
G4	5/5
GamePro	4.75/5
GameSpot	8.5/10
GameTrailers	9.3/10
IGN	9.4/10
Modojo	5/5

God of War: Chains of Olympus received "universal acclaim", according to review aggregator Metacritic, achieving the highest composite score for a PlayStation Portable title. The game's graphics were particularly praised, with Matt Leone of 1UP claiming Chains of Olympus is "a technical showpiece for Sony, and arguably the best-looking game on the system." Robert Falcon of Modojo.com similarly praised the presentation, calling it "an absolute stunner, the pinnacle of PSP development". He also praised the visuals as "absolutely breathtaking," and that the "game moves beautifully throughout, with very little loss in detail or speed." However, G4's Jonathan Hunt said that it "occasionally suffers from screen tearing and framerate drops."

Several reviewers praised Ready at Dawn's solution for the controls and gameplay. Because the PlayStation 2 (PS2) controller has two analog sticks and the PSP only has one, GamePro stated "the lack of a second analog stick could have been problematic but it's not." Modojo.com similarly stated that despite the lack of a second analog stick, "Kratos handles superbly on the PSP" and that the weapon and magic attacks are "mapped out perfectly around the PSP's control set-up." IGN's Chris Roper even claimed the control scheme "works better than on the PS2." Roper further claimed that Ready at Dawn "has done a stellar job of keeping Kratos' move set intact," stating that "combat is extremely responsive." Matt Leone of 1UP similarly praised developers solution for the control scheme as well as the game's "fantastic" pacing. However, GamePro criticized the relative lack of variety in enemies. The puzzles were criticized, and G4 claimed that some "are so maddeningly difficult to solve", while GameSpot's Aaron Thomas noted the lack of puzzles, claiming that it "could have used more". GamePro also criticized the fact that "You still have to lug boxes around to solve environmental puzzles". Kristan Reed of Eurogamer also criticized Ready at Dawn for cutting some puzzles, as well as cutting co-op play, multiplayer, dialogue, and characters.

GameSpot and IGN criticized the short length and minimal boss fights, although GamePro stated that the game has "the same epic feel" as the previous installments and claimed that if it was the only God of War title, "it would still stand on its own merits." GameTrailers went on to praise the replay value for being able to "bring your powered-up methods of destruction with you."

=== Awards and accolades ===
In IGN's Best of 2008 Awards, Chains of Olympus received the awards for "Best PSP Action Game", "Best Graphics Technology", and "Best Use of Sound". In GameSpot's Best Games of 2008, it received the "Readers' Choice Award". Diehard GameFAN awarded it "Best PSP Game" for 2008. At the 2008 Spike Video Game Awards, it was a nominee for "Best Handheld Game". It was Metacritic's 2008 "PSP Game of the Year". During the 12th Annual Interactive Achievement Awards in 2009, the Academy of Interactive Arts & Sciences awarded Chains of Olympus with "Hand-Held Game of the Year", along with receiving a nomination for "Adventure Game of the Year". In September 2010, GamePro named God of War: Chains of Olympus the best PSP game.
