= When Vikings Attack! =

2012 video game

- Developers: Clever Beans and XDev Studios Europe
- Publisher: Sony Computer Entertainment
- Platforms: PlayStation 3, PlayStation Vita
- Release: November 6, 2012
- Genre: Fighting

When Vikings Attack! is a fighting video game by British studio Clever Beans. It was released on November 6, 2012 as a downloadable game for the PlayStation 3 and supports Sony's cross-play feature on the PS Vita. The game is included on the "Best of PlayStation Network Vol. 1" compilation disc, released on June 18, 2013.

== Gameplay ==
When Vikings Attack! plays like an arena melee-brawler game.

The weapons used in the game are thrown objects. Players control a small group of civilians fighting hordes of vikings. The objective is to pick up objects and throw them in order to knock out enemies. A single hit is required to knock out an opponent's troop. Each time an object collides with a figure, they are knocked out and excluded from the group; larger or wide objects can knock out an entire group, resulting in the player being eliminated. Lost civilians can be replaced by recruiting stray people roaming around the arena. Special items can also be thrown to perform special effects, such as explosive bombs for an area of effect attack.

When Vikings Attack! has a campaign mode supporting up to four player co-op. The game has a multiplayer option with game modes such as last man standing and survival mode, along with a "collection extra" mode for viewing collected citizens of different outfits and movies.

== Reception ==
When Vikings Attack! received mixed to fairly positive reviews. In rating the game a 6.5, IGN described it as an "interesting and unique idea that's well-executed in premise, but that doesn't give you many reasons to keep coming back," praising the "degree of nuance" of the attack system and the game's accessibility to a wider audience but criticizing the game's "emphasis on sheer repetition."
