= God of War II =

2007 video game

- North American cover art
- Developer: Santa Monica Studio
- Publisher: Sony Computer Entertainment
- Directors: Cory Barlog; David Jaffe
- Producer: Steve Caterson
- Designer: Cory Barlog
- Programmer: Tim Moss
- Artist: Stig Asmussen
- Writers: Cory Barlog; James Barlog; Marianne Krawczyk
- Composers: Gerard Marino; Ron Fish; Mike Reagan; Cris Velasco
- Series: God of War
- Platform: PlayStation 2
- Release: NA: March 13, 2007; EU: April 27, 2007; AU: May 3, 2007
- Genres: Action-adventure, hack and slash
- Mode: Single-player

God of War II is a 2007 action-adventure game developed by Santa Monica Studio and published by Sony Computer Entertainment (SCE). First released for the PlayStation 2 on March 13, 2007, the game is the second installment in the God of War series, the seventh chronologically, and the sequel to 2005's God of War. It is based on Greek mythology and set in ancient Greece, with vengeance as its central motif. The player character is protagonist Kratos, the new God of War who killed the former, Ares. Kratos is betrayed by Zeus, the King of the Olympian gods, who strips him of his godhood and kills him. Slowly dragged to the Underworld, he is saved by the Titan Gaia, who instructs him to find the Sisters of Fate, as they can allow him to travel back in time, avert his betrayal, and take revenge on Zeus.

The gameplay is similar to the previous installment. It focuses on combo-based combat which is achieved through the player's main weapon—the Blades of Athena—and secondary weapons acquired throughout the game. It features quick time events (QTEs) that require players to quickly complete various game controller actions to defeat stronger enemies and bosses. The player can use up to four magical attacks and a power-enhancing ability as alternative combat options. The game also features puzzles and platforming elements. Compared to its predecessor, God of War II features improved puzzles and four times as many bosses.

God of War II was critically acclaimed upon release. It is considered as one of the greatest video games ever made and was 2007's "PlayStation Game of the Year" at the Golden Joystick Awards. The game sold 4.24 million units by June 2012, making it the sixteenth-best-selling PlayStation 2 game of all time. God of War II, along with God of War, was remastered and released in November 2009 as part of the God of War Collection, and in 2012, the remastered version was re-released as part of the God of War Saga, both for the PlayStation 3. God of War Collection was later ported to the PlayStation Vita in 2014. A novelization of the game was published in February 2013. A sequel, God of War III, was released in 2010. A remake is currently in development as part of the God of War Trilogy Remake compilation for PlayStation 5.

== Gameplay ==
God of War II is an action-adventure game with hack and slash elements. It's a third-person single-player video game viewed from a fixed camera perspective. The player controls the character Kratos in combo-based combat, platforming, and puzzle game elements, and battles foes who primarily stem from Greek mythology, including harpies, minotaurs, Gorgons, griffins, cyclopes, cerberuses, Sirens, satyrs, and nymphs. Other monsters were created specifically for the game, including undead legionnaires, ravens, undead barbarians, beast lords, rabid hounds, wild boars, and the army of the Fates, including sentries, guardians, juggernauts, and high priests. Many of the combination attacks used in God of War reappear, and the game features more than double the amount of boss fights and more difficult puzzles than the original. Platforming elements require the player to climb walls and ladders, jump across chasms, swing on ropes, and balance across beams to proceed through sections of the game. Some puzzles are simple, such as moving a box so that the player can use it as a jumping-off point to access a pathway unreachable with normal jumping, while others are more complex, such as finding several items across different areas of the game to unlock one door.

In addition to the regular health, magic, and experience chests that are found throughout the game world, there are three Uber Chests to be found. Two of these chests provide an additional increment to the Health and Magic Meters, respectively, and the third chest contains an abundance of red and gold orbs. Several urns are also hidden in the game (e.g., the Urn of Gaia) which, upon completion of the game, unlocks special abilities (e.g., unlimited magic) for use during bonus play.

=== Combat ===
Kratos uses magical attack Poseidon's Rage against the Colossus of Rhodes. The HUD in the upper left corner shows the player's Health (green) and Magic (blue) Meters. The red dot with the number 12 indicates the amount of red orbs collected.

Kratos' main weapon is a pair of blades attached to chains that are wrapped around the character's wrists and forearms. Called the Blades of Athena in this game, they can be swung offensively in various maneuvers. As the game progresses, Kratos acquires new weapons—the Barbarian Hammer, the Spear of Destiny, and periodically, the Blade of Olympus—offering alternative combat options. Although Kratos begins the game with Athena's Blades and the magic ability Poseidon's Rage (both at maximum power), the blades' power is reduced and the magic is relinquished after an encounter with Zeus (Poseidon's Rage can be regained by obtaining a certain urn). As with previous games, Kratos learns to use up to four magical abilities, such as Typhon's Bane that acts as a bow and arrow for distant targets, giving him a variety of ways to attack and kill enemies. Other new magical abilities include Cronos' Rage, Head of Euryale, and Atlas Quake. The special ability Rage of the Gods featured in the previous game is replaced by Rage of the Titans; unlike the previous game, the Rage meter—which allows usage of the ability—does not have to be full in order to use the ability, and can be switched on and off at will.

Kratos retains the relic Poseidon's Trident from the original installment, and gains new relics; the Amulet of the Fates, the Golden Fleece, and Icarus' Wings, each being required to advance through certain stages of the game. For example, the Amulet of the Fates slows time, but this does not affect Kratos and allows puzzle-solving that can not be achieved in normal game time. The Amulet of the Fates has limited usage before needing to be recharged (which occurs automatically and is represented by the Amulet of the Fates Meter). The Golden Fleece deflects enemy projectiles back at the enemies (used to solve certain puzzles). Icarus' Wings allows Kratos to glide across large chasms that cannot be crossed with normal jumping.

This game's challenge mode is called the Challenge of the Titans (seven trials), and requires players to complete a series of specific tasks (e.g., kill all enemies without being hit). The player may unlock bonus costumes for Kratos, behind-the-scenes videos, and concept art of the characters and environments, as rewards, as well as usage of the abilities found in the urns during the first playthrough. Completion of each difficulty level unlocks additional rewards, as does collecting 20 eyes from defeated cyclopes. A new mode, called Arena of the Fates, allows players to set difficulty levels and choose their own opponents to improve their skills.

== Synopsis ==
=== Setting ===
As with its predecessor, God of War II is set in an alternate version of ancient Greece, populated by the Olympian gods, Titans, heroes, and other beings of Greek mythology. With the exception of flashbacks, the events are set between those of the games Betrayal (2007) and God of War III (2010). Several locations are explored, including a real-world setting in the ancient city of Rhodes, and several fictional locations, including a brief scene in the Underworld, the Lair of Typhon, the Island of Creation and its locales, Tartarus, and a brief scene on Mount Olympus.

Rhodes, its skyline dominated by the massive Colossus of Rhodes, is a war-torn city under assault by Kratos, the God of War, and his Spartan army. The Lair of Typhon, hidden in an unknown location, is a snow-topped mountain and prison of the Titans Typhon and Prometheus. The Island of Creation is a vast island located at the edge of the world and home to the Sisters of Fate. The island is host to deadly traps, puzzles, and monsters. On the outskirts of the island are the Steeds of Time, and on the island itself are the Temples of Lakhesis and Atropos, and the Bog of the Forgotten, which hides the Gorgon Euryale and is the site of Jason of the Argonauts' last battle. Beyond the Bog are the Lowlands and the Great Chasm: a huge divide that blocks the way to the Palace of the Fates. At the base of the Chasm is the realm of Tartarus—prison of the Titan Atlas, condemned to hold the world on his shoulders. The Temple of the Fates is also filled with traps and monsters, while the final battle occurs on Mount Olympus, home to the gods.

=== Characters ===
The protagonist of the game is Kratos (voiced by Terrence C. Carson), a Spartan warrior who became the God of War after killing the former, Ares. Other characters include Athena (Carole Ruggier), the Goddess of Wisdom; Zeus (Corey Burton), the King of the Gods and the main antagonist; several Titans—including Gaia (Linda Hunt), Atlas (Michael Clarke Duncan), Prometheus (Alan Oppenheimer), Typhon (Fred Tatasciore), and Cronos (Lloyd Sherr)—heroes Theseus (Paul Eiding) and Perseus (Harry Hamlin); the insane Icarus (Bob Joles); the Gorgon Euryale (Jennifer Martin); an undead version of the Barbarian King (Bob Joles); and the Sisters of Fate—Lakhesis (Leigh-Allyn Baker), Atropos (Debi Mae West), and Clotho (Susan Silo). Minor characters include the boat captain (Keith Ferguson)—whom Kratos killed in the first game—and a loyal Spartan soldier (Josh Keaton; credited as the Last Spartan). Kratos' wife Lysandra, their daughter Calliope, and the Titan Rhea appear in flashbacks. The gods Hades and Poseidon appear in flashbacks of the Great War, and in the final cutscene alongside Zeus, Helios, and Hermes on Olympus.

=== Plot ===
Kratos, the new God of War following Ares' death, (Note: As depicted in the first God of War game) is still haunted by nightmares of his past and is shunned by the other gods for his destructive ways. Ignoring Athena's warnings, Kratos joins the Spartan army in an attack on Rhodes, during which a giant eagle, which Kratos assumes to be Athena, suddenly drains a huge portion of his powers and uses it to animate the Colossus of Rhodes. While battling the statue, Zeus offers Kratos the Blade of Olympus, a mighty sword that Zeus had forged and wielded to end the Great War, requiring Kratos to infuse the blade with the remainder of his godly power. Mortal once again, Kratos defeats the Colossus but is severely weakened after its hand crushes him while falling. The eagle reveals itself to have been Zeus all along, who admits he was forced to intervene as Athena refused to do so. Zeus then grants Kratos a final opportunity to be loyal to the gods and follow the will of Zeus, but Kratos refuses. Enraged by his defiance, Zeus kills him with the blade and destroys the entire Spartan army in a supernatural blast. As he dies, Kratos swears revenge on Zeus for betraying him and killing his army.

Kratos is slowly dragged to the Underworld, but is saved by the Titan Gaia. Gaia tells Kratos that she once raised the young Zeus, who eventually betrayed the Titans as vengeance for the cruelty inflicted on his siblings by Zeus' father, Cronos. She instructs Kratos to find the Sisters of Fate, who can alter time, prevent his death, and allow him his revenge on Zeus. With the aid of Pegasus, Kratos finds the lair of Gaia's brother Typhon. Imprisoned under a mountain, Typhon is angered at the intrusion and traps Pegasus, forcing Kratos to explore on foot. Kratos encounters the Titan Prometheus, who is chained in mortal form and tortured at Zeus' directive for giving fire to mankind. Prometheus begs to be released from his torment, so Kratos confronts Typhon to steal his magical bow. He blinds the massive Titan with it to escape and then uses it to free Prometheus, who falls into the Flames of Olympus and dies, finally free of eternal torture. The immolation releases the power of the Titans which Kratos absorbs, using it to free Pegasus and then fly to the Island of Creation.

Just before reaching the island, Kratos fights and kills Theseus to awaken the gigantic stone Steeds of Time—a gift to the Sisters of Fate from Cronos in an attempt to change his own fate—which grants Kratos access to the island. There, Kratos encounters and defeats several foes, some of whom are also seeking the Sisters of Fate, including an undead version of his old foe the Barbarian King, the Gorgon Euryale, Perseus, and a deranged Icarus, who throws himself with Kratos into Tartarus. After defeating Icarus and ripping his wings off to take for himself, Kratos eventually encounters the imprisoned Titan Atlas, who initially resents Kratos for his current predicament. (Note: As depicted in God of War: Chains of Olympus.) After Kratos reveals that he has become Zeus' enemy and explains his intent, Atlas reveals that Gaia and the other Titans also seek revenge on Zeus for their defeat in the Great War. Atlas also reveals that the Blade of Olympus is the key to defeating Zeus and helps Kratos to reach the Palace of the Fates.

After evading traps and defeating more enemies, Kratos encounters an unseen foe, revealed to be a loyal Spartan soldier also in search of the Sisters. Before he dies, the soldier informs Kratos that Zeus has destroyed Sparta in Kratos' absence. Outraged, Kratos defeats the Kraken and frees a phoenix, riding the creature to the Sisters' stronghold where he confronts two, Lakhesis and Atropos. After they refuse his request to alter time, Kratos battles them. During this, the Sisters try to change the outcome of Kratos' battle with Ares, but Kratos kills them both, then confronts the remaining Sister, Clotho. He kills her using her own traps, and acquires the Loom of Fate in order to return to the point at which Zeus betrayed him.

Kratos surprises Zeus and battles him; he seizes the Blade of Olympus and finally incapacitates him. Athena intervenes and implores Kratos to stop, as by killing Zeus, he will destroy Olympus. Kratos ignores her and tries to kill Zeus, but Athena sacrifices herself by impaling herself upon the blade, shocking Kratos long enough to allow Zeus to escape. Before she dies, Athena reveals that Kratos is actually Zeus' son, which the latter vehemently denies. Zeus was afraid Kratos would usurp him, just as Zeus had usurped his own father, Cronos. Kratos declares that the rule of the gods is at an end, then travels back in time and rescues the Titans just before their defeat in the Great War. He returns with the Titans to the present, and the gods watch as their former foes climb Mount Olympus. Kratos, standing on the back of Gaia, declares to Zeus that his son has returned to bring the destruction of Olympus. (Note: Setting up the events of God of War III.)

== Development ==
A sequel to God of War was first teased at the end of its credits, which stated, "Kratos Will Return". God of War II was officially announced at the 2006 Game Developers Conference (GDC). God of War Game Director David Jaffe stepped down and became the Creative Director of its sequel. God of War's lead animator Cory Barlog assumed the role of Game Director. In an interview with Computer and Video Games (CVG) in June 2006, Barlog said that while working on the first few drafts of script, he studied the mythology extensively. He said that the mythology is so large that "the real difficulty is picking things that really fit within the story of Kratos as well as being easy to swallow for audiences." Although he loves the idea of teaching things through storytelling (in this case Greek mythology), Barlog said, "you can't let your story get bogged down by that." He said that in the game, players would see "a larger view of Kratos' role within the mythological world." He also said that he liked the idea of a trilogy, but there were no plans "as of right now."

Like God of War, the game uses Santa Monica's Kinetica engine. Senior combat designer Derek Daniels said that for God of War II, they were basing the magical attacks on elements (e.g., air and earth). He said the combat system was updated so that it flowed smoothly between attacks and switching between weapons and magic. He said that they were working for a similar balance of puzzle solving, exploration, and combat seen in the first game, and they used elements that worked in that game as a base for the overall balance. Unlike God of War where magic had a small role, Daniels said that for God of War II, their goal was to make magic an integral part of the combat system and to make it more refined. Barlog said the game would feature new creatures and heroes from the mythology, and he wanted to put more boss battles in it. Commenting on multiplayer options, Barlog said that "there are possibilities for that but it is not something we are doing right now." He said that he felt that God of War is a single-player experience, and although multiplayer "would be cool," it did not appeal to him to work on. As for a PlayStation Portable (PSP) installment, he said that he thought it "would be freaking awesome," but not something he had time to work on and it was Sony's decision whether or not to make a PSP installment.

In an interview with IGN in February 2007, Barlog said that his goals for God of War II were to continue the previous game's story, expand on several elements, and to feature more epic moments as opposed to cinematics during gameplay. He said there were many additions to the game, but they did not differ greatly from the style of the previous game. Set-pieces and large scale epic moments were reworked "so that each battle you have really feels epic and unique." Barlog also hinted that another sequel would be made; he said, "The story has not yet been completed. The end has only just begun."

In another interview with IGN, both Jaffe and Barlog said that they did not view God of War II as a sequel, but rather a continuation of the previous game. Jaffe said that they did not want to include the Roman numeral number two (II) in the title for this reason, but they did not want the title to convey the impression it was an expansion pack. Both Jaffe and Barlog said that the reason God of War II appeared on the PlayStation 2 instead of the PlayStation 3—which was released four months prior to God of War II—was because "there's a 100 million people out there that will be able to play God of War II as soon as it launches." Barlog assured that the game would be playable on the newer platform, which at the time, had PlayStation 2 backwards-compatibility.

Four of the voice actors from the previous installment returned to reprise their roles, including Terrence C. Carson and Keith Ferguson, who voiced Kratos and the boat captain, respectively. Linda Hunt returned as the narrator, who was revealed to be the Titan Gaia, and Carole Ruggier returned as Athena; this was her final time voicing the character until a brief cameo in 2018's God of War. Both Paul Eiding, who had voiced Zeus and the gravedigger, and Fred Tatasciore, who had voiced Poseidon, returned but did not reprise those roles, and instead voiced the characters Theseus and Typhon, respectively. Corey Burton assumed the role of Zeus, having previously voiced the character in the 1998 Disney animated film Hercules: Zero to Hero and the subsequent animated series Hercules. Famed actors Michael Clarke Duncan and Leigh-Allyn Baker lent their voices for the characters Atlas and Lakhesis, respectively. Actor Harry Hamlin was chosen to voice the character Perseus because of his previous portrayal of the same character in the 1981 feature film Clash of the Titans. Although removed early in the game's development, Cam Clarke is credited for the voice of Hercules. Keythe Farley was the voice director alongside Kris Zimmerman and Gordon Hunt.

== Release ==
God of War II was released in North America on March 13, 2007, in Europe on April 27, and May 3 in Australia. It was released in Japan on October 25 by Capcom, under the title God of War II: Shūen no Jokyoku (ゴッド・オブ・ウォーII 終焉への序曲). The North American version was packaged in a two-disc set. The first disc was the PlayStation 2 game disc and the second disc was a DVD documentary of the game's development. The European/Australian PAL version was released as two different editions: a single-disc standard edition and a two-disc "Special Edition" with different box art and a bonus DVD. On April 6, 2008, it became available in the PlayStation 2 line up of Greatest Hits. Upon release, the game was banned in the United Arab Emirates due to "one topless scene".

=== Marketing ===
As a pre-order incentive, the demo disc of God of War II was made available to all customers who pre-ordered the game. On March 1, 2007, Sony held a media event that featured scantily clad women and a dead goat in Athens as part of the game's marketing campaign. The following month, the Daily Mail learned of the event from the UK Official PlayStation Magazine, called it a "depraved promotion stunt", and reported that Member of Parliament and anti-video game violence campaigner Keith Vaz said he would understand if the incident resulted in a boycott of Sony products. In response, Sony said the event had been sensationalized with hyperbole and that the article contained several inaccuracies, but apologized for the event.

=== Remastered port ===
The game and its predecessor, God of War, were released in North America on November 17, 2009, as part of the God of War Collection, featuring remastered ports of both games for the PlayStation 3 platform, with upscaled graphics and support for PlayStation 3 Trophies. It became available in Japan on March 18, 2010, Australia on April 29, and the UK on April 30. The "God of War II Bonus Materials"—content included on the second disc of the original North American PlayStation 2 version—was included with the retail version of the collection. God of War Collection was released as a digital download on the PlayStation Store on November 2, 2010, and was the first product containing PlayStation 2 software available via download. PlayStation Plus subscribers could download a one-hour trial of each game. The bonus materials, however, are not included in the digital download version. A PlayStation Vita version of God of War Collection was released on May 6, 2014. By June 2012, God of War Collection had sold more than 2.4 million copies worldwide. On August 28, 2012, God of War Collection, God of War III, and God of War: Origins Collection were included in the God of War Saga under Sony's line of PlayStation Collections for the PlayStation 3 in North America.

=== Remake ===
A remake of God of War II was announced during the February 2026 State of Play presentation as part of the God of War Trilogy Remake compilation, alongside remakes of the original God of War and God of War III. Terrence C. Carson, who appeared in a video message commemorating the project, is attached to reprise his role as Kratos in all three games.

== Other media ==
=== Soundtrack ===
God of War II: Original Soundtrack from the Video Game

Soundtrack album by various composers
- Released: April 10, 2007
- Genre: Contemporary classical music
- Length: 66:41
- Label: SCEI

God of War II: Original Soundtrack from the Video Game, composed by Gerard K. Marino, Ron Fish, Mike Reagan, and Cris Velasco, was released on CD by Sony Computer Entertainment on April 10, 2007. Dave Valentine of Square Enix Music Online gave the soundtrack an 8 out of 10, and said that it features a wide variety of ominous orchestral pieces, and each composer's contributions seem slightly more distinctive than the previous installment. Spence D. of IGN wrote that the score "is an impressive orchestral accomplishment within the ever-growing and constantly changing arena of videogame composition," but that it was aimed more towards the gaming experience of God of War II, rather than being a stand-alone musical experience. At the 2007 Spike Video Game Awards, the score was nominated for "Best Original Score". In March 2010, the soundtrack was released as downloadable content as part of the God of War Trilogy Soundtrack in the God of War III Ultimate Edition.

=== Novel ===
God of War II
- Author: Robert E. Vardeman
- Language: English
- Series: God of War
- Genre: Action, Adventure
- Publisher: Del Rey Books
- Publication date: February 12, 2013
- Publication place: United States
- Media type: Paperback
- ISBN: 978-0-345-50868-3

An official novelization of the game, titled God of War II, was announced in July 2009, along with a novelization of the original God of War. It was written by Robert E. Vardeman and published on February 12, 2013, by Del Rey Books in North America, and on February 19, 2013, in Europe by Titan Books. It is available in paperback, Kindle, and audio formats. The novel recounts the events of the game and adds even more layers than what the first book did in relation to the first game. The Sisters of Fate are given more story instead of only being the next to last boss fight of the game. They are introduced in Chapter 2 and have several chapters dedicated to what they were doing throughout Kratos' journey. For example, they allowed the Titans to come back due to their boredom and Lahkesis in particular liked to toy with Kratos. Due to how much the Sisters dabbled with Kratos' fate, it allowed him to make it as far as he did and also allowed him to act on his own will due to the many alterations to his life thread.

The intentions of some characters actions are also explained, and some characters are given more backstory. The Titan Typhon did not want to help Kratos because if he failed, Zeus would kill Typhon's wife Echidna and their children, who Zeus had allowed to live in freedom while Typhon was imprisoned. Theseus, the King of Athens, wanted the Sisters to give the god Dionysus a new lover so that he could have Ariadne back, and wanted to revive his father Aegus, who committed suicide as he thought Theseus had died. Theseus had the Aegean Sea named after his father. Jason of the Argonauts had stolen the Golden Fleece from Aeëtes of Colchis. He also loved a witch named Medea, who helped him steal the Fleece by killing her own brother. She also convinced Jason's nieces to murder his uncle Pelias and eat him as Pelias was going to betray Jason due to a false prophecy. Jason forsook Medea and married the daughter of King Creon, Creus, who was killed by Medea, along with their children. Despite this, Jason wanted Medea back because Creus did not truly love him. Jason died by Kratos' hand instead of the cerberus' as Jason tried to kill Kratos to get the Fleece back. Perseus was also given some backstory. He had fought the Graeae, a trio of witches. He fought the Gorgons and killed a monster that King Cepheus had tried to appease with a sacrifice. He wanted the Sisters to revive Andromeda, who was not explicitly mentioned in the game.

The novel introduced some characters who were not present in the game, or any other game. The goddesses Demeter and Hestia both made a very brief appearance just prior to Kratos joining the Spartans in Rhodes where Kratos overheard them discussing their displeasure of the endless war in Greece. Iris, the Goddess of the Rainbow and an occasional messenger, was another new character and had a more substantial role. Atropos contacted Iris and had her lie to Zeus about Kratos on several instances, and was the cause of distrust among the Olympians due to her rumor spreading and half-truths. She eventually replaced Hermes as the Messenger of the Gods. She also told Zeus that he would need to appoint a new God of War. Zeus pondered about making Hercules the new God of War. Athena wished Kratos to be returned as the God of War, thinking by doing so, it would stop the chaos and dissension between the gods. Hermes had thought to suggest Perseus as the new God of War and gifted him his invisibility helmet. Hermes eventually regained his position as the Messenger of the Gods when he finally convinced Zeus that Iris had been lying to him about Kratos. Iris was subsequently banished from Olympus, only to appear at sunrise and sunset, and when it rained.

The novel also explained that the Titans Rhea, Themis, Iapetus, and Mnemosyne, along with Hyperion, were banished to Tartarus after the Great War. At the end of the novel, the Titan Atlas was one of the Titans brought back from the past to reignite the Great War; in the game, Atlas was not brought back. Also in the game, Kratos and Theseus' fight was to determine who was the greatest warrior in all of Greece. This was not the bases for their fight in the novel. Another omission is that during Kratos' fight with the Barbarian King, the Boat Captain was not summoned to fight Kratos. Kratos also did not keep Euryale's head as a weapon. The first book omitted Kratos receiving the Blades of Athena; this book did not explain how he received them as he already had them at the start of the novel.

== Reception ==
Reception

Aggregate score
Aggregator	Score
Metacritic	93/100

Review scores
Publication	Score
1Up.com	A
Eurogamer	9/10
GameSpot	9.2/10
IGN	9.7/10

God of War II received "universal acclaim" from critics, according to review aggregator website Metacritic. The game is regarded as one of the best PlayStation 2 and action games of all time. It has been praised for its story and improvements over its predecessor, such as gameplay and graphics. Chris Roper of IGN said that God of War II is "one of gaming's most intense and engaging experiences available." He said it "is practically devoid" of the minor flaws of the original, citing an example that players can now quickly navigate wall climbing, such as being able to vertically slide down walls. Furthering his praise of the gameplay, he said that it is one of the most "polished and refined experiences...in gaming." Although he said that the combat mechanics were practically identical to the original, he had no complaints, stating it is "for good reason as it was already perfect the first time out."

Kristan Reed of Eurogamer said that "God of War II sports one of the most satisfyingly honed game designs we've ever come across." He said that it would not overwhelm players and that it motivates them to improve their skills. He said that the balance "always feels spot-on," and the "learning curve is just right," adding that the magic attacks are more useful than those in God of War. He also said that God of War II's gameplay, like the original, "finds a comfortable middle ground" between hardcore and casual players. Alex Navarro of GameSpot praised the pace of the game and the puzzle designs, and said the "scale of some of the levels is unbelievably massive." He also said that the story is interesting because it is more about what happens around Kratos, than what happens to him. Matt Leone of 1UP said that the strongest aspect "is how it excels as both a story and an action game," and it is the story that "allows the game to feel like a true sequel." Roper praised the scale of the levels, as well as the variety in environments, in comparison to the original installment, and said the art direction is "once again absolutely outstanding."

Reed praised the amount of detail and said that "at no stage did we ever see even a hint of frame-rate drop or v-syncing glitches." He also said that playing the game on the PS3 sharpens up the visuals. Navarro said that both the sound and graphics were "superb" and the technical graphics are impressive for the PlayStation 2. GameTrailers said that in terms of visuals, "there aren't that many PlayStation 2 games in the same league as God of War II." GameZone said that despite the issue of clipping, the game is "unbelievably gorgeous".

Roper said that there were a couple of puzzles "that seemed a little rough around the edges and whose otherwise straightforward solution suffered a bit from imperfect implementation." He also criticized the difficulty of unlocking some of the bonus content, as some requirements are "punishingly hard for most everyone." Reed, however, said if players can find any flaws, they are based on "personal taste", but also stated that regardless of refinement, "you can never quite replicate the wow factor of the original—even if it ends up being a better game." Navarro said that at times, the combat is "overly straightforward ... and still prone to button mashing," and said that it was "a bit disappointing" that more was not done to the combat system. He criticized the cliffhanger ending and said a few of the bonus challenges "aren't all that great." GameTrailers criticized the invisible walls, stating that "There are places you should be able to go that you simply can't." They also cited inconsistency issues in regards to navigation. Leone said his "only real" disappointment is that he did not feel the game was evolving the series.

=== Sales ===
Upon release, God of War II was commercially successful in multiple markets. In North America, it sold 833,209 units by the end of March 2007, twice as many units as the next-best selling game. The game was the best-selling game in the United Kingdom in the first week of release. It sold over one million units in the first three months after release, and in June 2012, Sony reported that it had sold over 4.24 million units.

=== Awards and accolades ===
Both IGN and GameSpot consider God of War II to be the "swan song" of the PlayStation 2 era. In 2007, it was awarded "PlayStation Game of the Year" at the 25th annual Golden Joystick Awards, and UGO awarded it "PS2 Game of the Year". At the 2007 Spike Video Game Awards, it was a nominee for "Best Action Game" and "Best Original Score". At the 12th Satellite Awards, God of War II received the Outstanding Platform Action/Adventure Game award. At the 2007 British Academy of Film and Television Arts (BAFTA) Video Game Awards, God of War II received the "Story and Character" and "Technical Achievement" awards, and was a nominee for "Action and Adventure", "Original Score", and "Use of Audio". During the 11th Annual Interactive Achievement Awards, the Academy of Interactive Arts & Sciences nominated God of War II for "Adventure Game of the Year" and "Outstanding Achievement in Original Music Composition". In 2009, IGN named God of War II the second-best PlayStation 2 game of all time—five ahead of its predecessor. In November 2012, Complex magazine named God of War II the best PlayStation 2 game of all time—where God of War was named the eleventh-best—and also considered it better than its successor, God of War III.
