= Winnie Waldron =

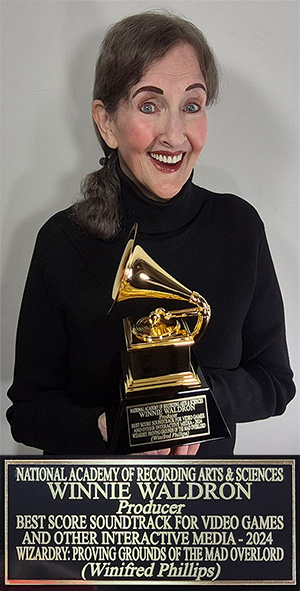
- Music producer Winnie Waldron receiving her Grammy Award for her work on the video game Wizardry: Proving Grounds of the Mad Overlord.)

Background information
- Occupation: Music producer
- Labels: Sumthing Else, WaterTower, E.A.R.S. EA Recordings

Winnie Waldron is an American music producer for video games, a producer for radio, a radio script editor / adapter, a manuscript editor and a radio host. Her music production credits include Assassin's Creed III: Liberation, God of War, and the LittleBigPlanet franchise. Waldron won the Grammy Award for her music production for the video game Wizardry: Proving Grounds of the Mad Overlord.

== Career ==
=== Radio ===
Waldron began her professional relationship with National Public Radio via the radio drama series Tales from the Other Side, a science fiction speculative series which aired as a part of NPR Playhouse in 1992. For this series, Waldron served as script editor, actress, on-air host and co-producer with her long-time creative partner Winifred Phillips.

From 1992 to 2003, Waldron served as on-air host, producer and script editor / adapter for a series of radio dramas, first presented on National Public Radio Playhouse under the title Generations Radio Theater Presents, and then later as Generations Radio Theater Presents: Radio Tales. This anthology series adapted classic works of American and world literature, and was a recipient of funding from the National Endowment for the Arts. The programs air regularly as the Radio Tales series on the Sirius XM Book Radio channel of Sirius XM Satellite Radio.

=== Video games ===
Waldron's latest project is the Wizardry: Proving Grounds of the Mad Overlord video game, for which she won a Grammy Award for Best Score Soundtrack for Video Games and Other Interactive Media. Other projects include the Jurassic World: Primal Ops video game, developed and published in 2022 by Behaviour Interactive in association with Universal Pictures and Amblin Entertainment.

Waldron produced the music for the Lineage M: The Elmor video game DLC released in 2021 from publisher/developer NCSoft, and the Sackboy: A Big Adventure video game, developed by Sumo Digital and published in 2020 by Sony Interactive Entertainment.

Waldron also produced music for the Sumo Digital developed game Spyder, released in 2020 for the Apple Arcade platform.

Waldron produced music in 2016 for the Homefront: The Revolution videogame, developed by DS Dambuster and published by Deep Silver.

In 2015, Waldron produced music for the Total War Battles: KINGDOM video game, developed by Creative Assembly and published by Sega.

Waldron served as music producer for the video game LittleBigPlanet 3: her work on this project earned a Hollywood Music in Media Award in the category of "Best Song in a Video Game."

To date, Waldron has produced music for nine games in the LittleBigPlanet franchise, including Sackboy: A Big Adventure, LittleBigPlanet 3, LittleBigPlanet 2, LittleBigPlanet 2: Cross Controller, LittleBigPlanet 2: Toy Story (DLC), LittleBigPlanet Karting, LittleBigPlanet PS Vita and LittleBigPlanet 3. The music of Sackboy: A Big Adventure was nominated in the British Academy Games Awards in 2021. LittleBigPlanet 2 was nominated for the 15th Annual Interactive Achievement Awards in the category of 'Outstanding Achievement in Original Music Composition'. LittleBigPlanet 2 was also nominated for the 2011 Game Developers Choice Awards in the category of 'Best Audio', which recognizes the overall excellence of audio in a game - including musical composition, orchestration, sound design, sound effects, etc. The 10th Annual Game Audio Network Guild Awards nominated the original music track, Victoria's Lab from LittleBigPlanet 2 in the category of 'Best Original Vocal - Pop'. Kotaku named the score of LittleBigPlanet 2 as one of the best video game soundtracks of the year. In the article "The Best Game Music of 2011: LittleBigPlanet 2", Features Editor Kirk Hamilton praised both the collection of licensed tracks and the original score, singling out theVictoria's Lab and Eve's Asylum tracks as his favorite original music of the game.

Waldron produced the music for the video game Assassin's Creed III: Liberation, which was also released as a soundtrack album on October 30, 2012. She won a 2012 Hollywood Music in Media Award and a GameFocus Award for producing the music score for Assassin's Creed III: Liberation. The main theme music of the Assassin's Creed III: Liberation video game won a G.A.N.G. Award from the Game Audio Network Guild in the category of "Best Original Vocal Song - Choral."' As the music producer for this game, Waldron also received nominations in several year-end award competitions, including the GameZone Awards, the Best of IGN Awards, and the G4TV X-Play Best of 2012 Awards.

Waldron's first project as a music producer for video games was the God of War adventure game from Sony Computer Entertainment America.

In 2007, Waldron worked with creative partner Winifred Phillips to produce a cover version of the theme song from the Super Mario Bros. video game for the compilation CD entitled Best of the Best: A Tribute to Game Music, Volume I, released by GameMusicCentral.

In 2008, she was music producer for the Speed Racer video game.

In 2009, Waldron produced the music of the Spore Hero videogame from Electronic Arts.

Also in 2009, Waldron served as music producer for the video game "SimAnimals" for the Wii. The music of "SimAnimals" was released as a downloadable soundtrack album by the record company E.A.R.S. EA Recordings on January 13, 2009.

Waldron is credited as music producer for the 2009 XBLA game The Maw.

Other video games for which Waldron served as music producer include Legend of the Guardians: The Owls of Ga'Hoole, Shrek the Third, The Da Vinci Code, and Charlie and the Chocolate Factory.

Waldron produced the music for the Legend of the Guardians: The Owls of Ga'Hoole video game soundtrack album, which was released on October 26, 2010 by WaterTower Music, a division of Warner Bros. One of the tracks on the album, entitled "With Hearts Sublime", is a winner of a 2010 Hollywood Music in Media Award in the category "Best Original Song - Video Game".

=== Other ===
Waldron served as the first manuscript editor of the book, A Composer's Guide to Game Music, which was published by MIT Press in March 2014.

== Awards ==
- Grammy Award 2025: Best Score Soundtrack for Video Games and Other Interactive Media - Wizardry: Proving Grounds of the Mad Overlord
- Society of Composers & Lyricists Award 2025: Outstanding Original Score for Interactive Media - Wizardry: Proving Grounds of the Mad Overlord
- Telly Award 2024: Best Music - Immersive, Interactive, & Mixed - Wizardry: Proving Grounds of the Mad Overlord
- NYX Game Award 2024: Best Original Game Soundtrack - Wizardry: Proving Grounds of the Mad Overlord
- NYX Game Award 2024: PC Game Best Music - Wizardry: Proving Grounds of the Mad Overlord
- NYX Game Award 2023: Mobile Game Best Music - Jurassic World Primal Ops
- Global Music Awards 2022: Best Game Music - Jurassic World Primal Ops
- Global Music Awards 2021: Best Video Game Soundtrack - "Waltz of the Bubbles" from Sackboy: A Big Adventure
- Global Music Awards 2021: Best Video Game Soundtrack - Spyder
- Global Music Awards 2015: Best Game Music - Total War Battles: Kingdom
- Hollywood Music in Media Award 2014: LittleBigPlanet 3
- Global Music Award 2013: Assassin's Creed III: Liberation
- Hollywood Music in Media Award 2012: Assassin's Creed III: Liberation
- Game Audio Network Guild Award 2012: Best Original Vocal Song - Choral (Assassin's Creed III: Liberation)
- Game Audio Network Guild Award 2012: Best Use of Licensed Music - LittleBigPlanet Karting
- GameFocus Award: Best Music - Assassin's Creed III: Liberation
- Hollywood Music in Media Award 2010: Best Original Song: Video Game - "With Hearts Sublime" (Legend of the Guardians: The Owls of Ga'Hoole)
- Movie Music U.K. Music Awards 2009: Best Score: Game - Spore Hero (Honorable Mention)
- Academy of Interactive Arts and Sciences Interactive Achievement Award: Outstanding Achievement in Original Music Composition (God of War)
- Game Audio Network Guild Award 2005: Music of the Year (God of War)
- Game Audio Network Guild Award 2005: Best Interactive Score (God of War)
- Game Audio Network Guild Award 2005: Best Cinematic / Cut-Scene Audio (God of War)
- Game Audio Network Guild Award 2005: Audio of the Year (God of War)
- GameSpot's Best of 2005: Best Original Music (God of War)
- PAX Gamers: Game of the Year Awards 2005: Best Sound (God of War)
- IGN PS2 Best Original Score (God of War)
- GameZone 2005 Game of the Year Awards: Best Original Score (God of War)
- American Women in Radio and Television Gracie Award 2004: Best National Network Drama (Radio Tales)
- American Women in Radio and Television Gracie Award 2003: Best National Network Drama (Radio Tales)
- American Women in Radio and Television Gracie Award 2001: Best National Network Drama (Radio Tales))
- The New York Festivals WorldMedal 2004: (Radio Tales)
- Golden Reel Merit Award 2001 (Radio Tales)

=== Nominations ===
- BAFTA Awards 2021: Best Original Music - Sackboy: A Big Adventure (Nomination)
- NAVGTR Awards 2021: Outstanding Song Collection - Sackboy: A Big Adventure (Nomination)
- NAVGTR Awards 2021: Outstanding Original Light Mix Score, New IP - Spyder (Nomination)
- G4TV X-Play's Best of 2012 Award: Best Soundtrack - Assassin's Creed III: Liberation (Nomination)
- GameZone Awards: Best Original Soundtrack - Assassin's Creed III: Liberation (Nomination)
- Best of IGN Awards: Best PS Vita Sound - Assassin's Creed III: Liberation (Nomination)
- 10th Annual Game Audio Network Guild Awards: Best Original Vocal - Pop: "Victoria's Lab" from LittleBigPlanet 2 (Nomination)
- 15th Annual Interactive Achievement Award: Outstanding Achievement in Original Music Composition - LittleBigPlanet 2 (Nomination)
- Game Developers Choice Award 2011: Best Audio - LittleBigPlanet 2 (Nomination)
- International Film Music Critics Association Awards 2009: Best Original Score for a Video Game or Interactive Media - Spore Hero (Nomination)
- Hollywood Music in Media Awards 2009: Original Score: Video Game - Spore Hero (Nomination)
- Hollywood Music Awards 2008: Original Score: Video Game - Speed Racer: The Videogame (Nomination)
- The Audio Publishers Association Audie Award (Nomination)
- G4 TV G-Phoria Award Best Original Soundtrack (Nomination)
- Spike TV Video Game Awards Best Original Score (Nomination)

== Works ==
=== Video game soundtracks ===
- Wizardry: Proving Grounds of the Mad Overlord
- God of War Ragnarok: Valhalla
- Jurassic World Primal Ops
- Lineage M
- Sackboy: A Big Adventure
- Spyder
- The Dark Eye: Book of Heroes
- Sports Scramble
- Ballista
- Shattered State
- Audioshield
- Scraper: First Strike
- Dragon Front
- Fail Factory
- Assassin's Creed III: Liberation
- Charlie and the Chocolate Factory
- The Da Vinci Code
- God of War (2005)
- Homefront: The Revolution
- Legend of the Guardians: The Owls of Ga'Hoole
- LittleBigPlanet 2 (Victoria's Lab & Eve's Asylum Levels)
- LittleBigPlanet 2: Cross Controller
- LittleBigPlanet 2: Toy Story (DLC)
- LittleBigPlanet 3
- LittleBigPlanet Karting
- LittleBigPlanet PS Vita
- The Maw
- Shrek the Third
- SimAnimals
- Speed Racer
- Spore Hero
- Total War Battles: KINGDOM
