= Winifred Phillips =

American music composer and author

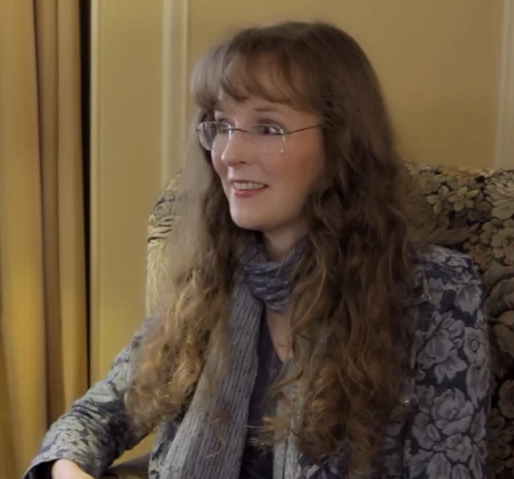
- Phillips in a video interview published March 2016

Background information
- Genre: Video game
- Occupation: Composer
- Website: www.winifredphillips.com

Winifred Phillips is an American music composer and author. Her music composition credits include God of War, Assassin's Creed III: Liberation, and the LittleBigPlanet series. In 2025, Phillips won a Grammy Award for Best Score Soundtrack for Video Games and Other Interactive Media for her music in the video game Wizardry: Proving Grounds of the Mad Overlord.

== Early life ==
Phillips' love of music began in childhood, supported by her experiences in the public school system. She looked upon her teachers and looked forward to her music classes. In middle school, her band teacher found out that she was a quick learner and got into the habit of giving her a new instrument to learn whenever there was a gap in one of his ensembles. She got to play all sorts of music and all different kinds of instruments, eventually becoming classically trained in keyboard and voice. In addition to her public school education, Phillips studied composition through private lessons with a local composer. She specifically used MIDI keyboards to begin experimenting with composition.

Phillips had been an avid gamer in her childhood and played everything from shooters and side-scrollers to sprawling RPGs. Phillips’ work on Radio Tales was heard by a music supervisor at Sony’s American gaming division. In 2004, Philips met with the supervisor, where they were shown God of War and asked to contribute music. It was after this meeting that Phillips truly realized she could compose for games.

== Career ==
=== Early career ===
From 1992 to 2003, Phillips was the composer, producer and actress in a series of radio dramas, first presented on National Public Radio Playhouse under the title Generations Radio Theater Presents, and then later as Generations Radio Theater Presents: Radio Tales. This anthology series adapted classic works of American and world literature, and was a recipient of funding from the National Endowment for the Arts. The series was described by NPR as "featuring a top-to-bottom music score that is completely original and fully integrated to the text". The programs aired regularly as the Radio Tales series on the Sirius XM Book Radio channel. On this project she worked with Winnie Waldron, the creator of Radio Tales, and would continue to work on scores together.

=== Video games ===
In 2004, Phillips contributed music to her first video game project, when she was hired by Sony Computer Entertainment America, now Sony Interactive Entertainment, to create God of War. This game was very successful, winning seven awards from the Game Audio Network Guild Awards, including Music of the Year. She then went on to compose the musical scores for Charlie and the Chocolate Factory in 2005, and The Da Vinci Code games in 2006, published by 2K Games. As of 2026, Winifred Phillips has composed scores for 34 video games, and 1 TV mini series.

Some relevant titles include the LittleBigPlanet video game franchise, SimAnimals, and most notably Assassin's Creed III: Liberation. For the music composition of Liberation, she won seven awards for this project including the Global Music Award for musical excellence, a Hollywood Music in Media Award, and GameFocus Award. The main theme of Liberation also won a G.A.N.G. Award from the Game Audio Network Guild in the category of "Best Original Vocal Song - Choral". The soundtrack also received nominations in competitions such as the GameZone Awards, the Best of IGN Awards, and the G4TV X-Play Best of 2012 Awards.

=== Writing ===
Phillips is the author of the book A Composer’s Guide to Game Music, which was published by the MIT Press in March 2014. The book uses her experience and knowledge from working in composition for video games to assist aspiration composers. The book has won several awards including a National Indie Excellence Book Award, and a Nonfiction Book Award from the Nonfiction Authors Association.

The book was very well received by critics and in 2015, O'Reilly Japan published a Japanese language edition titled Game Sound Production Guide - Composer Techniques for Interactive Music. Phillips also was a series of YouTube tutorials to supplement the book, and writes a blog with more information on the topic of scoring for video games. Beginning in 2015, she has also given keynotes at the Game Developer's Conference surrounding the topic of game audio.

== Works ==
Phillips has composed music for more than 20 video games across multiple genres. Her work spans action-adventure, simulation, role-playing, and casual games, demonstrating a high degree of stylistic versatility within interactive media.

Some notable titles include LittleBigPlanet, SimAnimals, and Assassin’s Creed III: Liberation. In addition to these, Phillips contributed to Spore Hero, where she developed adaptive musical systems designed to respond to gameplay progression, and LittleBigPlanet 2, which incorporated interactive scoring techniques aligned with user-generated gameplay environments.

Her work on licensed titles such as The Da Vinci Code and Charlie and the Chocolate Factory reflects her ability to compose within pre-existing cinematic and narrative frameworks while maintaining flexibility for interactive systems. Across her career, Phillips has composed for over 30 video games as well as television productions, contributing significantly to the development of music in interactive entertainment.

=== Compositional style and approach ===
Winifred Phillips is recognized for her work in interactive game music, particularly her use of adaptive and non-linear compositional techniques that respond dynamically to player input and gameplay conditions. According to her book, A Composer's Guide To Game Music, her approach often involves designing modular musical layers that can be rearranged, added, or removed in real time, allowing the score to evolve based on gameplay rather than following a fixed linear structure. Phillips' style also focuses on maintaining emotional continuity in interactive environments. Instead of composing isolated cues, she constructs musical systems that preserve thematic cohesion even as the music shifts in response to gameplay variability.

Phillips frequently combines orchestral instrumentation with electronic elements, creating hybrid soundscapes suited to a wide range of game genres. In works such as Assassin’s Creed III: Liberation, she incorporates choral writing and historically informed musical gestures to enhance narrative immersion and cultural context.

=== Discography ===
==== LittleBigPlanet Series ====
Year	Title	Developer
2011	LittleBigPlanet 2 (co-composer)	Media Molecule
2012	LittleBigPlanet PS Vita (co-composer)	Double Eleven, Tarsier Studios and XDev Studio Europe
2012	LittleBigPlanet Karting (licensed music)	United Front Games and San Diego Studio
2014	LittleBigPlanet 3 (co-composer)	Sumo Digital
2020	Sackboy: A Big Adventure (co-composer)	Sumo Digital

==== Other games ====
Year	Title	Developer
2005	God of War (co-composer)	Santa Monica Studio
2005	Charlie and the Chocolate Factory	High Voltage Software
2006	The Da Vinci Code	The Collective
2007	Shrek the Third	Amaze Entertainment
2007	Shrek-N-Roll	Backbone Entertainment
2007	Ben Jordan: Paranormal Investigator (only case 6)	Grundislav Games
2008	Speed Racer: The Videogame	Sidhe Interactive
2009	Spore Hero	Electronic Arts
2009	SimAnimals	Electronic Arts
2009	The Maw	Twisted Pixel Games
2010	Legend of the Guardians: The Owls of Ga'Hoole	Krome Studios
2010	Hasbro Family Game Night 3	Electronic Arts
2012	Assassin's Creed III: Liberation	Ubisoft
2013	Fighter Within	Ubisoft
2014	Clash of Kings	Elex Tech
2015	Call of Champions	Spacetime Studios
2015	Total War Battles: Kingdom (co-composer)	Creative Assembly
2016	Rival Stars College Football	PikPok
2016	Homefront: The Revolution	Dambuster Studios
2017	Little Lords of Twilight	BKOM Studios
2018	They Suspect Nothing	Coatsink
2018	Shattered State	Supermassive Games
2018	The Haunted Graveyard	Holospark
2018	Scraper: First Strike	Labrodex Inc
2019	Hades' Star	Parallel Space Inc
2019	Ballista	High Voltage Software
2019	Sports Scramble	Armature Studio
2020	Life Hutch VR	Chthonic Studios
2020	Spyder	Sumo Digital
2020	The Dark Eye: Book of Heroes	Random Potion
2021	Lineage M (co-composer)	NCSoft
2022	Jurassic World Primal Ops	Behaviour Interactive
2023	Wizardry: Proving Grounds of the Mad Overlord (remake)	Digital Eclipse

== Awards ==
=== Video games ===
Year	Award	Category	Recipient	Result
2005	Game Audio Network Guild Award	Audio of the Year	God of War	Won
2005	Game Audio Network Guild Award	Best Cinematic / Cut-Scene Audio	God of War	Won
2005	Game Audio Network Guild Award	Best Interactive Score	God of War	Won
2005	Game Audio Network Guild Award	Music of the Year	God of War	Won
2005	G4-TV G-Phoria 2005 Awards	Best Original Soundtrack	God of War	Nominated
2005	Spike TV Video Game Awards	Best Original Score	God of War	Nominated
2006	Interactive Achievement Awards	Outstanding Achievement in Original Music Composition	God of War	Won
2006	Game Audio Network Guild Award	Best Original Vocal Song - Choral	"Siren's Song" from God of War	Nominated
2008	Hollywood Music in Media Award	Best Original Score - Video Game	Speed Racer	Nominated
2009	International Film Music Critics Association Awards	Best Original Score for a Video Game or Interactive Media	Spore Hero	Nominated
2009	Hollywood Music in Media Award	Best Original Score - Video Game	Spore Hero	Nominated
2010	Hollywood Music in Media Award	Best Original Song: Video Game	"With Hearts Sublime", from Legend of the Guardians	Won
2011	Interactive Achievement Awards	Outstanding Achievement in Original Music Composition	LittleBigPlanet 2	Nominated
2011	Game Developers Choice Award	Best Audio	LittleBigPlanet 2	Nominated
2011	Hollywood Music in Media Award	Best Song - Video Game	"Victoria's Lab" from LittleBigPlanet 2	Nominated
2011	NAVGTR Award	Original Song	"Victoria's Lab" from LittleBigPlanet 2	Nominated
2012	AIAS Interactive Achievement Award	Outstanding Achievement in Original Music Composition	LittleBigPlanet 2	Nominated
2012	Game Audio Network Guild Award	Best Use of Licensed Music	LittleBigPlanet Karting	Won
2012	Game Audio Network Guild Award	Best Original Vocal Song - Choral	"Main Theme" from Assassin's Creed Liberation	Won
2012	Game Audio Network Guild Award	Best Original Vocal Song - Pop	"Victoria's Lab" from LittleBigPlanet 2	Nominated
2012	Hollywood Music in Media Award	Best Song / Score - Mobile Video Game	Assassin's Creed Liberation	Won
2013	Global Music Award	Best Video Game Music	Assassin's Creed Liberation	Won
2014	Hollywood Music in Media Award	Best Song - Video Game	"Ziggurat Theme" from LittleBigPlanet 3	Won
2014	Global Music Award	Best Video Game Music	"Ziggurat Theme" from LittleBigPlanet 3	Won
2015	Global Music Award	Best Composition / Composer	"Dark Ages" from Total War Battles: Kingdom	Won
2021	NAVGTR Award	Outstanding Original Light Mix Score, New IP	Spyder	Nominated
2021	NAVGTR Award	Outstanding Song Collection	Sackboy: A Big Adventure	Nominated
2021	Global Music Award	Video Game Soundtrack	Spyder	Won
2021	Global Music Award	Video Game Soundtrack	"Waltz of the Bubbles" from Sackboy: A Big Adventure	Won
2021	BAFTA Award	Best Music	Sackboy: A Big Adventure	Nominated
2022	Global Music Award	Game Music	Jurassic World Primal Ops	Won
2023	NYX Game Award	Mobile Game - Best Music	Jurassic World Primal Ops	Won
2023	NYX Game Award	Best Original Game Soundtrack	Horse Club Adventures: Complete Collection	Won
2023	NYX Game Award	Nintendo Switch Game - Best Music	Horse Club Adventures: Complete Collection	Won
2023	Game Audio Network Guild Award	Music of the Year	Jurassic World Primal Ops	Nominated
2023	Society of Composers & Lyricists Award	Outstanding Original Score for Interactive Media	Jurassic World Primal Ops	Nominated
2024	NYX Game Award	PC Game - Best Music	Wizardry: Proving Grounds of the Mad Overlord	Won
2024	NYX Game Award	Best Original Game Soundtrack	Wizardry: Proving Grounds of the Mad Overlord	Won
2024	Telly Award	Best Music — Immersive, Interactive, & Mixed	Wizardry: Proving Grounds of the Mad Overlord	Won
2024	Society of Composers & Lyricists Award	Outstanding Original Score for Interactive Media	Secrets of Skeifa Island	Nominated
2024	Hollywood Independent Music Awards	World	Spring Festival	Nominated
2025	Society of Composers & Lyricists Award	Outstanding Original Score for Interactive Media	Wizardry: Proving Grounds of the Mad Overlord	Won
2025	Grammy Awards	Best Score Soundtrack for Video Games and Other Interactive Media	Wizardry: Proving Grounds of the Mad Overlord	Won

==== Other awards ====
- Hollywood Music in Media Award 2021 (Nomination), Best Holiday Music: Ho-Ho-Holiday
- American Women in Radio and Television Gracie Award 2001, 2003, 2004: Best National Network Drama (Radio Tales)
- The New York Festivals WorldMedal 2004: (Radio Tales)
- American Women in Radio and Television Gracie Award 1998: Outstanding Achievement by an Actress ("The Yellow Wallpaper")
- Golden Reel Awards 2001 / National Federation of Community Broadcasters (Radio Tales)
- The Audio Publishers Association Audie Award 1999 (Nomination)
