= A Composer's Guide to Game Music =

2014 book by Winifred Phillips

- Author: Winifred Phillips
- Language: English
- Subject: Video game music / Music theory / Game studies
- Published: February 14, 2014 The MIT Press
- Publication place: United States
- Pages: 288
- ISBN: 0262026643

A Composer's Guide to Game Music is a 2014 book written by Winifred Phillips, a video game composer with over 11 years experience creating music for such games as Assassin's Creed Liberation, God of War and multiple games in the LittleBigPlanet franchise. Through the use of autobiographical anecdotes, scholarly discussion and practical advice, Phillips explores the creative and technical process of composing music for video games. The book was published by The MIT Press on February 14, 2014. The book has received many positive reviews and has won multiple awards.

== Contents ==
Throughout the book's fourteen chapters, Phillips draws from over a decade of experience as a composer in the video game industry in order to explore the creative and technical aspects of game music composition. The book investigates the specialized skills and training necessary for the pursuit of a game music career. The structural requirements of game music are discussed, including the distinctive creative workflow involved in composing both interactive and linear music for games. Dynamic music constructs such as horizontal resequencing, vertical layering, MIDI, MOD, and generative music are explored. Also included is an examination of technical abilities, equipment necessities, and software proficiencies that assist in the creation of music for games. The concluding chapter focuses on skills that help a game composer pursue a sustainable career, network in the video game industry, and build a resilient business.

Phillips intersperses practical advice with personal memories and anecdotes gleaned from her years in the video game industry. She describes the impetus that caused her to pursue a game music career, her early struggles to obtain work, her breakthrough when hired to join the music composition team for God of War, and her experiences during the development of several other game projects. Phillips also includes stories that explore the interpersonal dynamics within video game development and the gamer community, as well as the importance of game music fandom. The book periodically turns its attention to scholarly topics, including the influence of music on the immersion phenomenon, the relationship between game music and the Demographic Game Design (DGD) model, and several discussions of the role played by traditional music theory in the creation of music for video games.

== Reviews ==
A Composer's Guide to Game Music has been widely praised by critics in numerous publications including Music Connection Magazine, Sound on Sound Magazine, Film Score Monthly, Retro Videogame Magazine, Game Music Online, and The Film Music Society. Reviewers have praised the book's conversational prose style, clear organization, and thorough exploration of the topic, including its value as an academic text. Sound on Sound Magazine describes the book as "a great introduction to this specialist art," and Music Connection Magazine writes, "Already an acclaimed book, Phillips' hands-on insights and advice make this one a keeper."

Jon Burlingame, the leading journalist in the nation on film and television music, writers in an article for The Film Music Society that A Composer's Guide to Game Music is a "beautifully organized, intelligently written book about music for games," going on to say that "gamers as well as composers may be fascinated by her thorough analysis of what music works, and why, in various game genres," and adding that "the challenges unique to game composers are discussed at length."

The Los Angeles Review of Books describes A Composer's Guide to Game Music as "a level-headed worker's tour of a fantasy-fueled world," adding that Phillips "calmly guides the reader through new and old world compositional problems," and that the book "simply aims to be transparent and generous, and to offer a sensible, clear, and methodically minded explanation of how work happens in an illusory world."

A Retro Videogame Magazine review commends the book's thoroughness, writing that "you won't find a more comprehensive guide." BuySoundtrax writes, "Phillips has written the definitive book on scoring for video games."

Many reviewers have noted Phillips' approachable writing style. In his Reel Music review, Alan Rogers observes that Phillips "writes in a style that is very inclusive; there is no "I" or "you" but rather "we" and "us", as though the reader is accompanying Phillips on a journey of discovery. This makes for a very enjoyable tour through all aspects of video game music composing."

== Awards ==
A Composer's Guide to Game Music received the GMA Book Award from the Global Music Awards in December 2014; this award recognizes an exceptional book in the field of music.

Game Music Online presented an Annual Game Music Award in February 2015 to A Composer's Guide to Game Music in the "Publication, Broadcast, or Film" category. This award honors achievement in game music over the previous year.

A Composer's Guide to Game Music won a 9th Annual National Indie Excellence Book Award in May 2015 in the category of "Performing Arts (Film, Theater, Dance & Music)." This award honors achievement in books from independent publishers, including scholarly and university presses.

In June 2015, the Nonfiction Authors Association presented a Nonfiction Book Award to A Composer's Guide to Game Music in the category of "Arts, Music and Photography."

== Contribution ==
A Composer's Guide to Game Music has been recognized as a book that makes a significant contribution to the art form of video game music through a systematic, methodical examination of game music composition.

Film Score Monthly describes the book as "a touchstone academic achievement that should see many new editions with updates and expansions as Phillips, technology, and the industry itself evolve." Writing for Original Sound Version, Michael Hoffman observes that "If I were ever to select a book to help teach the music theory for writing game music, this would definitely be it," and GameMusicNet writes, "For music schools in general; this book might just prove to be a catalyst for a paradigm shift in education concerning composing music for the new media."

The book appears on multiple lists of recommended resources for game music professionals, including a list published by the Video Game Music Academy, a list of recommended reading from the makers of the film, Beep: A Documentary History of Video Game Music & Sound, and a Best Video Game Audio Books list by Brian L. Schmidt, president of the Game Audio Network Guild.

== Japanese edition ==
Game Sound Production Guide
- Game Sound Production Guide - Composer Techniques for Interactive Music
- Author: Winifred Phillips
- Language: Japanese
- Subject: Video game music / Music theory / Game studies
- Publisher: August 26, 2015 O'Reilly Japan
- Publication place: Japan
- Pages: 283
- ISBN: 4873117291

On August 26, 2015, O'Reilly Japan published the Japanese language edition of A Composer's Guide to Game Music. The book was translated by Miyazaki Sky, with Takeuchi Masaki serving as translation supervisor. The book has held the #1 spot on the Digital Music Books bestsellers chart on Amazon Japan.

== Academic study ==
A Composer's Guide to Game Music is a subject of instruction at multiple colleges/universities and post-graduate programs that offer courses in creative music technology, sound for interactive media, adaptive music for video games, and other similar courses of study. Institutions using the book as an instructional text include the London College of Music, University of Sussex, Kent State University, Columbia College Chicago, the University of Durham, and the DigiPen Institute of Technology, among others.

The book has also appeared as a scholarly citation in research papers and books on the subject of game music and the interaction between music and technology. These include the book Music Apps for Musicians and Music Teachers (Rowman & Littlefield), the research paper You'll Never Walk Alone: Designing a Location Based Soundtrack (International Conference on New Interfaces for Musical Expression), and the research paper Music to Middleware: The Growing Challenges of the Game Music Composer (2014 Conference on Interactive Entertainment).

A Composer's Guide to Game Music is included in the collections of over 241 libraries around the world. The book has been acquired by numerous university libraries for use by students; these institutions include (among many others):

- University of Cambridge
- Juilliard School
- Harvard University
- Berklee College of Music
- University of Oxford
- UCLA
- Stanford University
- Princeton University
- Oberlin Conservatory of Music
- Yale University
- Eastman School of Music
- University of Chicago
- Massachusetts Institute of Technology
- Johns Hopkins University
- University of Edinburgh, Scotland
- Cornell University
- New York University
- Trinity College Dublin
- University of St Andrews, Scotland
- Nanyang Technological University, Singapore
- University of Adelaide, Australia
- Royal College of Music, Stockholm

== See also ==
- 2014 in literature
- Video game music
- Music theory
- Game studies
