= Frank Pollack =

Frank Pollack may refer to:

- Frank Pollack (American football), former offensive tackle
- Frank L. Pollack, early American science fiction writer and author
