= Radio Tales =

American radio series

Image of trademarked Radio Tales logo and photo of composer Winifred Phillips and producer Winnie Waldron in the Hilton Hotel in New York City after winning a Gracie award in 2004.

Radio Tales is an American series of radio drama which premiered on National Public Radio on October 29, 1996. This series adapted classic works of American and world literature such as The War of the Worlds, Twenty Thousand Leagues Under the Seas, Beowulf, Gulliver's Travels, and the One Thousand and One Nights. The series was co-produced by Winnie Waldron and Winifred Phillips. Waldron created the series and served as on-air host. Phillips composed music for the series and was also the narrator for each story.

The Radio Tales series has won awards which include the International Radio Festivals WorldMedal for its production "Fortress of Doom" and four Gracie Allen Awards from the Foundation of American Women in Radio and Television, including a Best Actress in a National Network Drama award for Winifred Phillips' performance in "The Yellow Wallpaper".

== History ==
In 1996, Waldron and Phillips produced the pilot program for a new series of dramatic radio adaptations of classic stories and novels from around the world. The series was first presented on National Public Radio Playhouse under the title Generations Radio Theater Presents, and then later as Generations Radio Theater Presents: Radio Tales. The pilot program was an adaptation of the classic Edgar Allan Poe horror story "Masque of the Red Death", and was described by NPR as "elegantly macabre". National Public Radio Playhouse aired the pilot program on October 29, 1996.

The Generations Radio Theater Presents: Radio Tales series aired on National Public Radio affiliate stations from 1996 until 2002. During its broadcast run on National Public Radio, the Radio Tales series was underwritten by the National Endowment for the Arts. In 2002, the series moved to XM Satellite Radio’s Sonic Theater channel. Retitled Radio Tales, the series made its XM Satellite Radio premiere on Thanksgiving Day with the holiday program "O. Henry's Thanksgiving". The Radio Tales series aired on XM Satellite Radio's Sonic Theater channel from 2002 until 2008 and was dropped from the channel when it was renamed Sirus XM Book Radio.

== Programs in the series ==
- "20,000 Leagues Under the Sea": An adaptation of Twenty Thousand Leagues Under the Seas by Jules Verne, first broadcast on April 24, 2001 via National Public Radio.
- "A Matter of Prejudice": An adaptation of "A Matter of Prejudice" by Kate Chopin, first broadcast on September 25, 2001 via National Public Radio.
- "Apocalypse": An adaptation of "Finis" by Frank L. Pollack, first broadcast on October 30, 2001 on National Public Radio.
- "Arabian Nights Trilogy: Aladdin and his Magical Lamp": An adaptation of the tale of Aladdin from One Thousand and One Nights, first broadcast on August 21, 2001 via National Public Radio.
- "Arabian Nights Trilogy: Sindbad the Sailor": An adaptation of the tale of Sindbad from One Thousand and One Nights, first broadcast on September 22, 2003 via XM Satellite Radio.
- "Arabian Nights Trilogy: Ali Baba and the Forty Thieves": An adaptation of the tale of Ali Baba from One Thousand and One Nights, first broadcast on September 15, 2003 via XM Satellite Radio.
- "Asteroid": An adaptation of "The Star" by H. G. Wells, first broadcast on August 14, 2001 via National Public Radio.
- "Beowulf": An adaptation of Beowulf, first broadcast on May 15, 2001 via National Public Radio.
- "The Birthmark": An adaptation of "The Birthmark" by Nathaniel Hawthorne, first broadcast on Dec. 15, 1998 via National Public Radio.
- "The Boarded Window": An adaptation of "The Boarded Window" by Ambrose Bierce, first broadcast on April 3, 2001 via National Public Radio.
- "The Canterville Ghost": An adaptation of "The Canterville Ghost" by Oscar Wilde, first broadcast on July 3, 2001 via National Public Radio.
- "Celtic Hero": An adaptation of Tochmarc Emire (The Wooing of Emer) from the Ulster Cycle, first broadcast on February 29, 2000 via National Public Radio.
- "Charles Dickens' Ghost Story": An adaptation of "The Trial for Murder" by Charles Dickens, first broadcast on December 6, 2003 via XM Satellite Radio.
- "Chicago 2065": An adaptation of "With the Night Mail" and "As Easy as A.B.C." by Rudyard Kipling, first broadcast on October 23, 2001 via National Public Radio.
- "Chopin's Locket": An adaptation of "The Locket" by Kate Chopin, first broadcast on August 29, 2000 via National Public Radio.
- "Dr. Jekyll and Mr. Hyde": An adaptation of Strange Case of Dr Jekyll and Mr Hyde by Robert Louis Stevenson, first broadcast on January 18, 2000 via National Public Radio.
- "Dracula's Guest": An adaptation of "Dracula's Guest" by Bram Stoker, first broadcast on October 19, 1999 via National Public Radio.
- "Edgar Allan Poe's Predicament": An adaptation of "A Predicament" by Edgar Allan Poe, first broadcast on November 16, 1999 via National Public Radio.
- "Edgar Allan Poe's Valdemar": An adaptation of "The Facts in the Case of M. Valdemar" by Edgar Allan Poe, first broadcast on March 14, 2000 via National Public Radio.
- "Edith Wharton's Journey": An adaptation of "A Journey" by Edith Wharton, first broadcast on December 24, 1996 via National Public Radio.
- "The Fall of the House of Usher": An adaptation of "The Fall of the House of Usher" by Edgar Allan Poe, first broadcast on November 10, 1998 via National Public Radio.
- "Feet of Clay": An adaptation of "Feet of Clay" by Kate McPhelim Cleary, first broadcast on December 11, 2001 via National Public Radio.
- "Fifth Dimension": An adaptation of "The Plattner Story" by H. G. Wells, first broadcast on September 5, 2000 via National Public Radio.
- "Fortress of Doom": An adaptation of "The Fortress Unvanquishable, Save for Sacnoth" by Lord Dunsany, first broadcast on January 10, 2005 via XM Satellite Radio.
- "Frankenstein": An adaptation of Frankenstein by Mary Shelley, first broadcast on November 2, 1999 via National Public Radio.
- "The Furnished Room": An adaptation of "The Furnished Room" by O. Henry, first broadcast on February 1, 2000 via National Public Radio.
- "The German Student": An adaptation of "The Adventure of the German Student" by Washington Irving, first broadcast on October 6, 1998 via National Public Radio.
- "The Ghost of Wuthering Heights": An adaptation of Wuthering Heights by Emily Brontë, first broadcast on February 8, 2000 via National Public Radio.
- "The Gift of the Magi": An adaptation of "The Gift of the Magi" by O. Henry, first broadcast on December 24, 1996 via National Public Radio.
- "Gulliver's Travels": An adaptation of Gulliver's Travels by Jonathan Swift, first broadcast on December 7, 1999 via National Public Radio.
- "Homer's Odyssey Trilogy: Tale of the Cyclops": An adaptation of Book Nine of the Odyssey by Homer, first broadcast on January 4, 2000 via National Public Radio.
- "Homer's Odyssey Trilogy: Voyage to the Underworld": An adaptation of Book Ten and Book Eleven of the Odyssey by Homer, first broadcast on April 19, 2003 via XM Satellite Radio.
- "Homer's Odyssey Trilogy: The Voyage Home": An adaptation of Book Twelve of the Odyssey by Homer, first broadcast on April 26, 2003 via XM Satellite Radio.
- "Hop-Frog": An adaptation of "Hop-Frog" by Edgar Allan Poe, first broadcast on October 27, 1998 via National Public Radio.
- "The Hunchback of Notre-Dame": An adaptation of The Hunchback of Notre Dame by Victor Hugo, first broadcast on November 20, 2001 via National Public Radio.
- "Ice Maiden": An adaptation of "Hilda Silfverling: A Fantasy" by Lydia Maria Child, first broadcast on September 5, 2000 via National Public Radio.
- "The Invisible Man": An adaptation of The Invisible Man by H. G. Wells, first broadcast on April 10, 2001 via National Public Radio.
- "The Island of Dr. Moreau": An adaptation of The Island of Dr. Moreau by H. G. Wells, first broadcast on March 21, 2000 via National Public Radio.
- "Jason and the Argonauts": An adaptation of the Argonautica by Apollonius Rhodius, first broadcast on September 4, 2001 via National Public Radio.
- "Journey to the Center of the Earth": An adaptation of Journey to the Center of the Earth by Jules Verne, first broadcast on August 15, 2000 via National Public Radio.
- "Laughin' in Meetin'": An adaptation of "Laughin' in Meetin'" by Harriet Beecher Stowe, first broadcast on September 26, 2000 via National Public Radio.
- "The Lone Indian": An adaptation of "The Lone Indian" by Lydia Maria Child, first broadcast on July 17, 2001 via National Public Radio.
- "Lord of the Celts": A Celtic musical adaptation of the story of Fionn and Sadb from the Fenian Cycle, first broadcast on December 1, 1998 via National Public Radio.
- "The Lost World": An adaptation of The Lost World by Arthur Conan Doyle, first broadcast on September 12, 2000 via National Public Radio.
- "Masque of the Red Death": An adaptation of "The Masque of the Red Death" by Edgar Allan Poe, first broadcast on October 29, 1996 (the initial program of the series broadcast on NPR).
- "Moon Voyager": An adaptation of The First Men in the Moon by H. G. Wells, first broadcast on November 6, 2001 via National Public Radio.
- "Mrs. Manstey's View": An adaptation of "Mrs. Manstey's View" by Edith Wharton, first broadcast on December 18, 2001 via National Public Radio.
- "The Mummy": An adaptation of The Jewel of Seven Stars by Bram Stoker, first broadcast on October 5, 1999 via National Public Radio.
- "A New England Nun": An adaptation of "A New England Nun" by Mary Eleanor Wilkins Freeman, first broadcast on December 4, 2001 via National Public Radio.
- "O. Henry's Last Leaf": An adaptation of "The Last Leaf" by O. Henry, first broadcast on December 31, 1996 via National Public Radio.
- "O. Henry's Thanksgiving": An adaptation of "Two Thanksgiving Day Gentlemen" by O. Henry, first broadcast on September 18, 2001 via National Public Radio.
- "Otherworld": An adaptation of "The Remarkable Case of Davidson’s Eyes" by H. G. Wells, first broadcast on October 9, 2001 via National Public Radio.
- "Owl Creek Bridge": An adaptation of "An Occurrence at Owl Creek Bridge" by Ambrose Bierce, first broadcast on May 29, 2001 via National Public Radio.
- "The Phantom of the Opera": An adaptation of The Phantom of the Opera by Gaston Leroux, first broadcast on June 5, 2001 via National Public Radio.
- "The Pit and the Pendulum": An adaptation of "The Pit and the Pendulum" by Edgar Allan Poe, first broadcast on July 4, 2000 via National Public Radio.
- "Revolt of Mother": An adaptation of "The Revolt of 'Mother'" by Mary Eleanor Wilkins Freeman, first broadcast on August 8, 2000 via National Public Radio.
- "Silence, a Fable": An adaptation of "Silence—A Fable" by Edgar Allan Poe, first broadcast on November 24, 1998 via National Public Radio.
- "Sleepy Hollow": An adaptation of "The Legend of Sleepy Hollow" by Washington Irving, first broadcast on October 13, 1998 via National Public Radio.
- "Stephen Crane's Dark Brown Dog": An adaptation of "A Dark Brown Dog" by Stephen Crane, first broadcast on January 18, 2000 via National Public Radio.
- "The Tell-Tale Heart": An adaptation of "The Tell-Tale Heart" by Edgar Allan Poe, first broadcast on September 29, 1998 via National Public Radio.
- "The Time Machine": An adaptation of The Time Machine by H. G. Wells, first broadcast on December 21, 1999 via National Public Radio.
- "Time Warp": An adaptation of "The New Accelerator" by H. G. Wells, first broadcast on August 7, 2001 via National Public Radio.
- "Voltaire's Planet Trek": An adaptation of "Micromégas" by Voltaire, first broadcast on January 3, 2004 via XM Satellite Radio.
- "War of the Worlds": An adaptation of The War of the Worlds by H. G. Wells, first broadcast on June 19, 2001 via National Public Radio.
- "Watchers": An adaptation of "The Crystal Egg" by H. G. Wells, first broadcast on October 2, 2001 via National Public Radio.
- "The Yellow Wallpaper"": An adaptation of "The Yellow Wallpaper" by Charlotte Perkins Gilman, first broadcast on December 10, 1996 via National Public Radio.

== Critical reception ==
The Radio Tales series has received generally positive reviews for its programs. AudioFile described the series as delivering “vivid, intriguing new radio drama”. In its review of "The Mummy", Billboard described Phillips’ on-air performance as “a cultured voice that’s appropriate to Stoker’s formal language but is able to convey the appropriate tone of horror,” adding that “subtle and mysterious music adds to the atmosphere”. In its review of the series’ adaptation of Charlotte Perkins Gilman’s feminist horror story "The Yellow Wallpaper", Publishers Weekly wrote, “Sensational. … (Phillips') charged narration is augmented with sound effects and a musical score.” In reviewing the series’ production "Sleepy Hollow", Billboard wrote, “This telling of Washington Irving’s classic yarn is a real treat”, also describing the music as adding “an effectively spooky touch to the production.” AudioFile described the series’ production "Masque of the Red Death" as “a magnificent demonstration of the very best the medium has to offer.” The series was selected as a "Featured Artist Spotlight" by MP3.com, which described the programs as "an art form in and of themselves," adding that the programs feature "richly textured music and sound-scapes commensurate with the changing moods and atmospheres of the text," and that "(Phillips') experience in acting shines through in her apt delivery."

== Awards ==
- American Women in Radio and Television GRACIE AWARD 2004
- The New York Festivals WORLDMEDAL 2004
- American Women in Radio and Television GRACIE AWARD 2003
- American Women in Radio and Television GRACIE AWARD 2001
- American Women in Radio and Television GRACIE AWARD 1998, Outstanding Achievement by an Actress
- The International Radio Festivals WORLD'S BEST WORK AWARD, Best Sound Series 2001
- The Audio Publishers Association AUDIE AWARD HONORS
- The NFCB GOLDEN REEL AWARD HONORS

== Audiocassette releases ==
- The American Classic Collection (DH Audio) ISBN 1-55204-966-3
- The Birthmark (Durkin Hayes Publishing Ltd) ISBN 0-88646-887-6
- The Fall of the House of Usher (Durkin Hayes Publishing Ltd) OCLC 43211527
- The Gift of the Magi (Durkin Hayes Publishing Ltd) ISBN 0-88646-898-1
- Hop-Frog (Durkin Hayes Publishing Ltd) ISBN 0-88646-859-0
- The Legend of Sleepy Hollow (Durkin Hayes Publishing Ltd) ISBN 0-88646-903-1
- The Masque of the Red Death (Durkin Hayes Publishing Ltd) ISBN 0-88646-894-9
- The Tell-Tale Heart (Durkin Hayes Publishing Ltd) ISBN 0-88646-953-8
- The Yellow Wallpaper (Durkin Hayes Publishing Ltd) ISBN 0-88646-895-7
- The War of the Worlds (Durkin Hayes Publishing Ltd) ISBN 0-88646-996-1
