= Aveline de Grandpré =

Assassin's Creed character

- Assassin's Creed character
- First appearance: Assassin's Creed III: Liberation (2012)
- Created by: Ubisoft Sofia
- Voiced by: Amber Goldfarb

In-universe information
- Family: Philippe de Grandpré (father); Jeanne (mother); Madeleine de L'Isle (stepmother); Subject 1 (descendant)
- Origin: New Orleans, Louisiana, New France
- Nationality: French

Aveline de Grandpré is a fictional character in Ubisoft's Assassin's Creed video game franchise. She first appeared as the protagonist of Assassin's Creed III: Liberation, a spin-off installment originally released for the PlayStation Vita in October 2012. She has also featured in a titular expansion pack for the 2013 title Assassin's Creed IV: Black Flag, as well as other spin-off media of the franchise. In both of her video game appearances, she is portrayed by actress Amber Goldfarb through performance capture.

Within the series' alternate historical setting, Aveline is a Louisiana Creole member of the Assassin Brotherhood (a fictional organization inspired by the real-life Order of Assassins) who was active in New Orleans during the French Louisiana era in the mid-18th century, as well as the subsequent Spanish occupation of Louisiana. Her primary objectives are to defend abused slaves and fight for their freedom, as well as eliminate members of the Templar Order (inspired by the Knights Templar military order), the Assassins' mortal enemies, whom she encounters during her adventures.

Critical reception towards Aveline has been mostly positive, particularly for her status as a prominent female character of color and her role in the fictionalized depiction of the Atlantic slave trade in the Assassin's Creed series. She is the first female protagonist of the series and is well received as a positive example of ethnic minority representation in video games.

== Concept and design ==
In an interview with Evan Narcisse from Kotaku, Liberation writer Jill Murray explained that Aveline was concepted by developmental staff at Ubisoft Sofia at the beginning of the project, which predated her involvement. She noted that the studio "did their research and decided from the beginning that a woman Assassin of French and Haitian descent would be a compelling character". Along with co-writer Richard Fareze (sic), the formal research they relied on were official documents from the era that directly impacted life for the characters of Liberation, in particular the Code Noir, a French legal document which defined the conditions and rules of slavery in territories under French sovereignty. Murray also read slave narratives from various eras to immerse herself into their experiences and reactions people, along with their use of written language. Murray said she also took inspiration from informal conversations with people, particularly if their own experiences are relevant to the subject matter she explores as part of her work.

In response to a line of questioning from Narcisse as to whether it was a conscious decision or a coincidence that Aveline's character arc incorporated tropes such as the "tragic mulatto", "slave revenge" and the "Back-to-Africa movement", Murray indicated that her approach to text, as informed by her work background in theatre production, is with an eye for how to bring worlds and characters to life, rather than critical analysis for its own sake from an English or cultural studies perspective. Murray explained that Aveline's arc should not be interpreted as an attempt to reflect the entirety of the 18th century black experience as she is "an individual, not a people or an issue". Thus, Murray and her co-writer would look for other opportunities to represent different points of view through the characters Aveline meets, who are depicted as an array of individuals attempting to survive and carve out their own destinies in diverse ways. For example, the backstory of Aveline's mother Jeanne, from her abduction into a life of slavery and becoming the placée of Aveline's French father Philippe Olivier de Grandpré, is recounted in a series of diary entries which Aveline could collect in the game world. Aveline also meets a man who has no territory he feels he can call home, and comes into conflict with a former slave who has opted to fight for the English as a soldier in exchange for his freedom.

With regards to Aveline's presentation as a female protagonist in the Assassin's Creed franchise, Murray noted that it has not changed how the game itself is presented, though the actual game mechanics introduced "some fresh energy and some new opportunities" into the game's design. Murray was of the view that it is necessary to rebut incorrect assumptions and misconceptions about the perceived risks involving the creation and inclusion characters from minority groups, noting that writers should have to rise to the occasion if they believe in their characters, and show themselves and people they work with how to portray them successfully. She emphasized that "this does not require magic, scary effort—it's effort anyone can put in. It's fun, it adds variety, and it makes a lot of players feel good."

Aveline has access to three personas in Liberation: besides her well-armed Assassin persona, she also has the "lady" persona, a respectable businesswoman who is following in her father's footsteps, and a "slave" persona where she is able to blend in among black slaves who have similar backgrounds as her mother. Each persona is more than a change in physical attire as she exhibits different abilities, and alters the way she interacts with her environment as well as how characters respond to her; guards will attempt to protect her from danger when Aveline assumes her "lady" persona, whereas they will react with hostility if she is encountered as an Assassin. Murray suggested that with each persona, Aveline attempts to see where within the society of New Orleans she fits, and that she truly becomes herself whenever she assumes the Assassin persona, as it is a combination of every aspect of her identity which she grows into and comes to inhabit.

Weapons employed by Aveline include dueling pistols, a cane knife, a whip she appropriates from a slave master at a predetermined point in Liberation's narrative, poison darts fired from a blowgun or a modified parasol, and the Assassins' signature Hidden Blade. Many of Aveline's in-game movements for Liberation were taken directly from those designed for Connor and Haytham Kenway, the two playable characters of Assassin's Creed III; only a handful of her animations, such as walking and running, were replaced.

== Appearances ==
=== Assassin's Creed III: Liberation ===
Aveline is an ancestor of "Subject 1", the first participant in the Animus Project conducted by Abstergo Industries, a corporate front of the Templar Order in the modern era. The story of Liberation is presented as a story within a story in the form of a video game created by Abstergo using the genetic memories of Subject 1.

The game's backstory establishes that Aveline was born in 1747 in New Orleans to Philippe Olivier de Grandpré, a French merchant, and his African placée, Jeanne, whom Philippe had freed from slavery. In 1752, Phillippe married Madeleine de L'Isle, the daughter of one of his investors, to alleviate his financial troubles, straining his relationship with Jeanne, who later disappeared from both his and Aveline's lives. From a young age, Aveline took notice of the injustice slaves faced in New Orleans, and dedicated herself to protecting them, catching the attention of Agaté, the Mentor of the Louisiana Brotherhood of Assassins. Impressed by her devotion to freedom and justice, he inducted Aveline into the Brotherhood along with her childhood friend, Gérald Blanc. Both were trained by Agaté to be his agents in New Orleans and counter the Templars' activities, with Aveline handling field work and Gérald running an information network within the city.

The main story of Liberation covers twelve years of Aveline's life, from 1765 to 1777, and focuses on her mission to dismantle the Templar Order in New Orleans, who are attempting to take over Louisiana amidst the colony's transition of control from France to Spain. To this end, she assassinates several of the Templars' allies, including French governor Jean-Jacques Blaise d'Abbadie and Baptiste, an Assassin turncoat and former friend of Agaté. In 1768, Aveline is ordered by Agaté to kill Louisiana's new Spanish governor, the Templar Antonio de Ulloa, but she spares him after Ulloa informs her of a secret Templar worksite in Chichen Itza, which houses many liberated slaves from New Orleans.

Infiltrating the worksite, Aveline discovers that the Templars' leader, known only as the "Company Man", seeks a Precursor artifact called the Prophecy Disk and set up the worksite to excavate Chichen Itza in search of the artifact. Aveline retrieves the Disk and kills the camp's overseer, Rafael Joaquín de Ferrer, while also unexpectedly reuniting with her mother Jeanne. Through pages of Jeanne's old diary, Aveline learns more details of her mother's past, including her mission to protect the Disk and her history with Agaté. Ultimately, Aveline is able to reconcile with her mother prior to returning to New Orleans to continue investigating the Templars.

Back in Louisiana, Aveline works to uncover the Company Man's identity. With the assistance of fellow Assassin Connor (the protagonist of Assassin's Creed III), she eliminates a Templar and Loyalist officer named George Davidson, from whom she learns the disturbing truth that her own stepmother Madeleine is the Company Man and poisoned Philippe. When Aveline confronts Madeleine, the latter attempts to recruit her to the Templar Order and tasks her to kill Agaté. Having grown apart from her Mentor, Aveline is attacked by Agaté when she attempts to warn him of the Templars' plans, forcing her to fight him. Upon his defeat, an ashamed Agaté commits suicide, and Aveline seemingly accepts Madeleine's invitation to join the Templars, only to double-cross and kill her stepmother, eradicating the Templar Order of New Orleans.

=== Other appearances ===
The Aveline expansion pack for Assassin's Creed IV: Black Flag follows Aveline in 1784, seven years after the events of Liberation. The expansion sees Aveline traveling to Newport, Rhode Island, to find an escaped slave named Patience Gibbs and recruit her to the Assassin Brotherhood at the behest of Connor. In Newport, Aveline and Patience join forces to kill the Templar Edmund Judge, Patience's former master, and recover a charm he stole from her, revealed to be a Piece of Eden.

In the modern-day sections of Black Flag, a market analysis for Abstergo Entertainment, the video games subsidiary of Abstergo Industries, can be found via hacking computers. The market analysis reveals the process through which Aveline was selected by Abstergo to headline her own game, and how the company altered certain aspects of her story to make it more "appealing" to general audiences. In Assassin's Creed Unity, Abstergo has produced another fictional video game starring Aveline, titled The Liberation of Lady Aveline, which can be seen at the start.

Aveline was also featured as part of Assassin's Creed: Initiates, a discontinued community-oriented website operated by Ubisoft that was active from August 2012 to December 2015. The character's signature outfit is an unlockable cosmetic option for Evie Frye, one of the two protagonists of the 2015 game Assassin's Creed Syndicate. In the 2016 novel Assassin's Creed: Last Descendants by Matthew J. Kirby, Aveline is indirectly mentioned as the grandmother of the Assassin Mentor during the American Civil War.

== Promotion and reception ==
Like other protagonists in the series, Aveline has been subject to merchandise. A promotional video featuring a limited edition figurine of Aveline was uploaded to Ubisoft's official YouTube account on 15 November 2018. Aveline's likeness, along with five other series protagonists, was used for a line of character-themed wine labels as part of a joint collaboration between Ubisoft and winemaker Lot18; the full name of her label is "2017 Aveline de Grandpré Appellation Côtes du Rhône Contrôlée".

As a character, Aveline has been mostly well received. She is considered to be one of the most notable black characters in video game history. Evan Narcisse from Kotaku wrote positively of the character on more than one occasion, and believed that she is a "great black game character". He was intrigued by the idea of Aveline because of her ethnic background and that it is uncommon for a character like her to be in the leading role of a major video game. In an article published for Kotaku in February 2013, Narcisse considered Liberation to be the "best example of how to craft a character descended from African heritage in a video game", as it takes a historical moment where the action happens and finds ways to integrate the experience of being a mixed-race woman in 18th Century New Orleans into an interesting playable adventure. Conversely, Narcisse expressed disappointment that Aveline was voiced by a white actress, and contrasted the decision to the casting of an actor who has Blackfoot heritage for Connor, a character of Native American descent.

Chris Suellentrop from The New York Times suggested that Aveline may have been "the greatest black heroine in the history of video games" in an article dated January 2014, and that she is deserving of a wider audience which he believed the early 2014 release of the high-definition makeover of Liberation for platforms far more popular than the PlayStation Vita should provide. Suellentrop commented that while neither the original version of Liberation nor the remastered version were very good, with aspects such as gameplay, storytelling and voice acting being of questionable quality at best, he has yet to encounter a game which deals with the history and imagery of slavery in the New World in intimate detail through Aveline's story arc, and that the game demonstrates a level of sensitivity and intelligence in its approach. Mike Williams from US Gamer agreed that Liberation is a flawed game, though he enjoyed the exploration of Aveline's role in New Orleans as an assassin and as the free daughter of a former slave, and expressed hope that the remastered version of the game would enjoy a new, wider audience. Jef Rouner from Houston Press noted that Aveline was discussed extensively during the controversy surrounding gender options for the cooperative mode of Assassin's Creed Unity in 2014, with some quarters labeling her an inferior series protagonist as the original version of Liberation was perceived to be a portable spin-off which lacked the distinctive gameplay of the mainline console entries, though Rouner emphasized that she is still "pretty badass". On the other hand, Tobias Kraft criticized Aveline's characterization in his chapter of the book New Orleans and the Global South: Caribbean, Creolization, Carnival as "shallow" and that her motivations never goes beyond the "obvious trail" of heroic solidarity and individual sacrifice, and said that she falls short of the standards set by Jean Genet's Les Negres".

The Guardian staff included her in their list of "30 truly interesting female game characters", commenting that her ability to change her appearance in order to alter how other characters treat her is apt for the nature of her position as the series' first female protagonist, and noted that while Ubisoft may have received criticism for its attitude towards female characters, she was never reduced into being a mere love interest to Connor at the very least. Aveline placed favorably on PC Gamer's ranking list of Assassin's Creed series protagonists, with Andy Kelly calling her "infinitely more interesting than boring old Connor".

In a 2015 discussion panel titled "The Visual Politics of Play: On the Signifying Practices of Digital Games", Professor Anna Everett took the view that Ubisoft's decision to feature Aveline as a lead character of a major video game franchise, while commendable, is undermined by the fact that Liberation is set in the colonial period of slavery which is "overdetermined in both its willingness to address this ignoble past and, arguably, its unwillingness to craft a powerful contemporary black shero tackling racial justice issues in the 21st century". The panel's chair, Professor Soraya Murray, devoted the first chapter of her 2017 book On Video Games: The Visual Politics of Race, Gender and Space to analyze Aveline's role within the narrative of Liberation and the franchise as a whole. Jagger Gravning from The Atlantic analyzed Aveline's choice of clothing, dialogue and mannerisms in Liberation as well the eponymous Black Flag DLC, and concluded that her gender identity or sexual orientation is ambiguous and may be open to interpretation.

== See also ==
- History of New Orleans
