= Finis (short story) =

1906 short story written by Frank Lillie Pollock

"Finis" is a short story written by American-Canadian science fiction author Frank Lillie Pollock (sometimes misspelled as Frank Lillie Pollack), and published in The Argosy magazine, June 1906. It has been reprinted in magazines, translated, and anthologized numerous times, occasionally under the title "The Last Dawn". The story text is now out of copyright.

"Finis" is the story of a new star that is discovered which turns out to be a new, hotter sun. It is a short, but hard hitting story which shows a man and woman who stay up the night to watch the expected new star arise. Though published in 1906, it is set in the future of the mid 20th century.

== Synopsis ==
The story starts with two men and two women at an observatory in New York City. They are awaiting the appearance of a new star that has been predicted by top scientists that will rival the moon in intensity. The entire world is excited about this new heavenly body and people stay up the night waiting. It is February and very cold but around midnight the temperature starts to climb and the snow melts. Then a very bright moon rises, which is brighter than normal because it is reflecting the new star's light. Then the sky turns ablaze with color as the new sun is seen and the blast of heat is almost immediate. One of the women screams as a nearby flag catches fire. The city starts to go up in smoke and those directly in the heat quickly die. One of the men in the observatory flees with his wife and it is assumed that they die outside. The remaining man and woman quickly try to get to the cellar as the building they are in starts to collapse. The extreme heat has evaporated the sea water which now comes back as a torrential rain. The city starts to flood and a thick cloud of steam fills the air. The couple makes it down to the cellar and the heat is almost unbearable as they just lie on the floor going in and out of consciousness. Finally the rain stops and the heat starts to go up again but then the new sun goes down and darkness brings some coolness to them. They talk about their future and realize that when the new sun comes up the next morning, the heat will kill them and everyone left. They realize that they will be dead soon and have a last kiss. The sun then comes up and the world is burnt to a crisp.

== Magazine Publication ==
- The Argosy magazine, June 1906.
- Famous Fantastic Mysteries magazine, May–June 1940, vol. 2, no. 2.
- Fantastic Novels Magazine, Mar 1948, vol. 2, no. 2.
- Magazine of Horror and Strange Stories, August 1963, vol. 1, no. 1, as "The Last Dawn"
- S-Fマガジン (S-F Magazine) Oct. 1974/10X No.191 (translated to Japanese by Hisashi Asakura )

== Anthologies ==
- Horror Omnibus, ed. Kurt Singer, titled "The Last Dawn", W. H. Allen, 1965, Panther, 1966.
- Science Fiction by Gaslight, ed. Sam Moskowitz, World, 1968
- Horror 1, ed. Kurt Singer, translated to German from the title "The Last Dawn", 1971
- Beyond Time and Space, ed. Robert R. Potter, Globe Book Company, 1978
- The Arbor House Treasury of Science Fiction Masterpieces, ed. Robert Silverberg & Martin H. Greenberg, Arbor House, 1983
- Great Tales of Science Fiction, ed. Robert Silverberg & Martin H. Greenberg, A&W/Galahad, 1985
- The Oxford Book of Science Fiction Stories, ed. Tom Shippey, Oxford University Press, 1992
- Bangs and Whimpers: Stories About the End of the World, ed. James Frenkel, 1999.
- The Mammoth Book of Science Fiction, ed. Mike Ashley, Robinson 1-84119-375-5, Mar 2002.

== Adaptations ==
- The 2001 Radio Tales drama "Apocalypse" was an adaptation of the story for National Public Radio.
