= SimAnimals =

2009 video game

- Developer: Electronic Arts
- Publisher: Electronic Arts
- Director: Charles London
- Producer: Byrt Martinez
- Designer: Sam Hart
- Programmer: Bob Flanagan
- Artist: Chuck Eyler
- Composer: Winifred Phillips
- Series: Sim
- Platforms: Nintendo DS, Wii
- Release: NA: January 21, 2009; EU: January 30, 2009; AU: February 5, 2009
- Genre: Life simulation
- Modes: Single-player, multiplayer

SimAnimals is a life simulation video game published by Electronic Arts for the Nintendo DS and Wii console systems. It was released on January 21, 2009, in North America. It was released on January 30, 2009, in Europe and on February 5, 2009, in Australia. A sequel, SimAnimals Africa, was released for Wii and Nintendo DS on October 27, 2009.

== Gameplay ==
The game has the player in a similar role as in The Sims controlling a disembodied hand in which the player manipulates over 30 types of animals, and creates their habitat around them. The animals evolve personalities depending on how the user treats (or mistreats) them.

The players can use the animals to solve challenges and achieve goals by discovering secrets, unlocking forest areas and uncovering one-of-a-kind objects and wild animals, some with special abilities, by having the animals successfully complete tasks.

After a certain number of achievement points are earned in the DS version, the player can blow into the DS microphone, creating wind for the pickup of berries.

The players can pick up anything in the forest including trees, flowers, other plants, animals, water, logs, and rocks.

The game contains more than 30 species of animals from the Northern Hemisphere.

Electronics retailer Best Buy offered an exclusive in-game animal (panda, red panda, and ferret for Wii, electric squirrel for DS) with purchase during the initial US release of the game.

== Development ==
=== Soundtrack ===
The music for SimAnimals was composed by Winifred Phillips and produced by Winnie Waldron.

The music from the game was released on January 13, 2009, as a digital download album by E.A.R.S. EA Recordings. The SimAnimals soundtrack album was released to positive reviews and high scores, including a 9.5 out of 10 from Michael Pascua of The Celebrity Cafe, a 90 out of 100 from Jeremy Hill of Gamertell, and a 9 out of 10 from the music review site VGM Rush.

== Reception ==
SimAnimals has a score of 60% on Metacritic, which indicates mixed or average reviews, and 69% on GameRankings.

IGN gave the game a 5.3, writing, "The Sims franchise is insanely popular for a reason, and growing a community, whether it be man or animal, is rewarding. But no effort has been put into the presentation here. The game doesn't run smoothly, the forest is unattractive, and the controls aren't user-friendly. The game garnered some positive reviews. USA Today awarded SimAnimals 5 stars out of 5. Reviewer Jinny Gudmundsen wrote, "[SimAnimals] is a fascinating experience that is hard to put down... There are many things that make this game compelling, including the outstanding graphics, music and artificial intelligence, but the most attractive feature is that the game lets you explore the delicate balances found in nature.
