= Speed Racer: The Videogame =

2008 racing video game

- North American Wii cover art
- Developers: Sidhe Interactive; Virtuos (Nintendo DS); Glu Mobile (Mobile)
- Publishers: Warner Bros. Interactive Entertainment; Glu Mobile (Mobile)
- Producers: Andy Satterhwaite; Dean Hall; Jeff Nachbaur
- Composer: Winifred Phillips
- Engine: Gamebryo
- Platforms: Mobile phone, Wii, Nintendo DS, PlayStation 2
- Release: Mobile; April 29, 2008; Wii, Nintendo DS: NA: May 6, 2008; EU: May 9, 2008; AU: June 4, 2008; JP: July 10, 2008 (Wii); JP: July 24, 2008 (DS); PlayStation 2: NA: September 16, 2008; EU: October 16, 2008
- Genre: Racing
- Modes: Single-player, multiplayer

Speed Racer: The Videogame is a racing video game developed by Sidhe Interactive for the PlayStation 2 and Wii consoles, by Virtuos for the Nintendo DS and by Glu Mobile for mobile phones; and published by Warner Bros. Interactive Entertainment and Glu Mobile. It is a tie-in to the 2008 movie Speed Racer, set one year after its events. The actors from the movie reprise their roles in the console versions of the video game counterpart. The mobile version was released in April 2008, and the Nintendo versions were released on May 6, 2008, with the PlayStation 2 version being released on September 16, 2008, alongside the DVD and Blu-ray release. Due to the short development time allotted, Warner Bros. chose not to release the game on other contemporary non-Nintendo platforms.

== Gameplay ==
The game is a racing game similar to the F-Zero series, including tracks full of odd twists, turns and loops, set in five exotic locations (six in the PS2 version). The goal of the game is not only to win first place in each race, but also to have the most points by the end of the cup to win the competition. Points can be earned by placing high during races, but also by performing stunts and, most commonly, bashing into and destroying other racers with the use of car acrobatics, referred to as "car-fu" in the game. Driving well (i.e. avoiding accidents) and performing "car-fu" fills the player's boost meter; once the meter is filled up, a boost is rewarded. Up to four boosts can be stored at once, and may be used at any time. If all four boosts are used at once by quadruple-tapping the boost button, the player enters a state called "The Zone", during which their car travels more than twice as fast as its regular top speed and becomes invincible, on top of the player's "car-fu" doing more significant damage. Boosts may alternatively be expended on quick repairs, refilling the car's health meter, up to half the meter. The vehicle's health is shown as a gauge on the HUD, in addition to visual cues, such as the camera suddenly zooming out to indicate the car is on the verge of destruction. If the player's car explodes, the player will respawn near where they left off after a brief period of time, during which the player will also lose their race positions.

Each version of the game has its own unique control method. The PS2 version uses a standard control setup, with an analog stick used for steering and buttons used for pedals and car-fu moves. The Nintendo DS version is played entirely with d-pad and buttons, although the player can tap the touch screen to zoom in and out on a position meter that it displays. The Wii version can only be played with the Wii Remote turned sideways, with or without the Wii Wheel, leveraging its motion controls to steer and perform stunt and car-fu moves; analog control is not supported.

There are a total of 20 playable racers from the film in the game (25 in the PS2 version and 16 on the Nintendo DS version), each with their own unique vehicle with its own stats. Each racer also has a default set of ally and rival racers, e.g. Speed Racer's ally is Trixie, while his rival is Jack "Cannonball" Taylor. The player is awarded bonus points for performing "car-fu" on the rival or destroying their car. In certain gameplay modes, the player can also form or break alliances with other racers. Allies will attempt to interfere with the player's rival, but the player will receive penalty should they perform "car-fu" on allies.

== Soundtrack ==
The original musical soundtrack of the Speed Racer video game was composed by Winifred Phillips and produced by Winnie Waldron. It has received positive reviews. Reviewer Sam Bishop of IGN wrote, "The music in the game happily bounces back and forth from vaguely tribal, ambient tracks to more driving, aggressive sounding electronica loops."

Track listing
No.	Title	Length
1.	"Opening Cinema"	2:36
2.	"Zoom"	4:31
3.	"Thunderhead"	2:33
4.	"Onuris"	2:34
5.	"Chick-Chick-Chick-Ah!"	4:38
6.	"Fuji Helexicon"	2:35
7.	"Rev it Up"	4:34
8.	"Aurora Cryopticon"	2:34
9.	"Move It"	4:34
10.	"Cosmopolis Grand Prix"	2:32
11.	"Under the Hood"	4:36
12.	"End Credits"	3:39

== Reception ==
Reception

Aggregate score
Aggregator	Score			
Aggregator	DS	mobile	PS2	Wii
Metacritic	75/100	N/A	72/100	69/100

Review scores
Publication	Score			
Publication	DS	mobile	PS2	Wii
Eurogamer	N/A	N/A	N/A	6/10
Famitsu	24/40	N/A	N/A	N/A
GamePro	3.5/5	N/A	N/A	3.75/5
GameZone	N/A	N/A	N/A	7.2/10
IGN	8/10	7/10	8/10	7/10
NGamer	N/A	N/A	N/A	49%
Nintendo World Report	8.5/10	N/A	N/A	7.5/10
PALGN	6/10	N/A	N/A	7/10
VideoGamer.com	N/A	N/A	N/A	7/10

The DS version received "generally favorable reviews", while the PlayStation 2 and Wii versions received "average" reviews, according to the review aggregation website Metacritic. In Japan, Famitsu gave it a score of one five, one seven, and two sixes for the DS version.
