= Legend of the Guardians: The Owls of Ga'Hoole (video game) =

2010 video game

- North American Xbox 360 cover art
- Developers: Krome Studios; Tantalus Media (Nintendo DS)
- Publisher: Warner Bros. Interactive Entertainment
- Composer: Winifred Phillips
- Platforms: Nintendo DS, PlayStation 3, Wii, Xbox 360
- Release: NA: September 14, 2010; AU: September 29, 2010; EU: October 8, 2010
- Genre: Combat flight simulator
- Mode: Single-player

Legend of the Guardians: The Owls of Ga'Hoole is a 2010 video game adapted for PlayStation 3, Wii and Xbox 360 as well as Nintendo DS. Developed by Krome Studios (Tantalus Media for the Nintendo DS) and published by Warner Bros. Interactive Entertainment, released on September 14, 2010. It is based on the film of the same name, and includes some elements from the books. The game takes place during the events of the movie.

== Plot ==
=== Introduction ===
The story of the game follows the tale of Shard and his friends. The story coincides with the plot of the movie. The Glauxian Monks worshipped the owl god Glaux, hidden away from the hardships of everyday life. Surtr and the Pure Ones had been defeated years ago by Lyze of Kiel and the land had been returned to peace. However, during the watch of a young guard named Grettir, the Monastery was attacked by monstrous, vulture-like birds called Hagsfiends. After losing most of what he knew as his family, he was plagued with guilt and many others who heard the story branded him a traitor and a coward. After many years of isolation, Grettir took a mate named Lygeia and had an egg together. On the night that the owlet was to hatch, the nest was attacked by a group of vicious owls. They successfully killed Grettir and his mate, but the owlet survived due to the timely arrival of a Guardian chaw. The group takes the owlet back to the Ga'Hoole tree and names him Shard due to an egg shell left on his feathers. He then enters training to become a Guardian, though his father's legacy continues to follow him.

=== Tutorial ===
Shard charges into battle at the side of Allomere, destroying catapults and defeating enemy forces. Just as the battle turns in the Guardians' favor, Allomere is attacked and killed. Shard is surrounded by bats and crows but before they can attack, he wakes up from his dream. We are then introduced to our other main character, Parzival. Allomere, a character also in the Legends of the Guardians movie, is the ryb of both students. After Shard takes offense to Parzival insulting his father, it escalates into a fight between the two owls and Allomere gives them flint mops, or work, for punishment. Ezylryb asks to take care of the flint mops, since he has less responsibilities than Allomere. The flint mop is lighting torches for the Great Tree. Just as Shard and Parzival finish their job, the Search and Rescue chaw comes in with a band of owlets that are later revealed to be Soren, Gylfie, Twilight and Digger, who are being attacked by a murder of crows. After Shard and Parvizal clear away the crows, the owlets go to parliament to tell the story of their time at St. Aegolius and what the Pure Ones were doing. The Parliament comes to the decision that Allomere will leave to verify the truth of Soren's claim. After the decision, Ezylryb gives Shard the task of executing secret missions as a Guardian to investigate the Pure Ones' plot. Shard and Parzival then set off to the Desert Kingdom of Kuneer.

=== The Desert of Kuneer ===
Shard is tasked with finding an eagle named Streak and discovering the cause for the disappearance of young owlets in the area. Shard and Parzival find Streak imprisoned by bats allied with the Pure Ones and free him. Streak becomes Shard's wingman along with Parzival and they accompany him in missions for the rest of the story. Streak reveals the rumors of owlet snatching are true, and the bats are being rewarded for their loyalty by being given some Non-Tyto owlets. Shard and his band go on a mission to find the hideout by destroying bat sanctuaries to make the bats reveal the location of their hideout. After one of the bats tells Streak it was east of the sanctuary, they make their way to the hideout. The band finds the secret hideout filled with bats and Pure Ones. After they defeat the defenses of the hideout, reinforcements come to defend the hideout, which validates the rumors of the owlets being held there.

The group finds some bats still taking owlets from nests, and after rescuing them, the group realizes these problems aren't going to stop unless they take the fight to the bats. After a small attack on Streak's Nest, the band goes and devises a plan to force the bats out of the hiding places within the compound by flushing them out with hot coals. The battle becomes more intense as the hideouts are burned and the band defeats the remaining defenses. After what seems like a victory, the enormous Bat Chieftain comes out of hiding to fight the protagonists. After vanquishing both the Chieftain and his wingmen they free a wandering hermit named Uriah, who tells them that the Pure Ones are working with the bats to gain control of a mysterious substance called flecks. He asks to join Shard's band and becomes one of his wingmen, also accompanying the band for the rest of the story. The band returns to the Great Tree to inform them of what was happening in the Desert of Kuneer.

=== The Forest Kingdom of Tyto ===
Shard is tasked with finding the activities of the Pure Ones have in the Forest of Tyto and finding locals who could know what they are doing. Shard and Parzival follow a squadron of Pure Ones who lead them to a prison with resistance fighters locked up in them. The band frees Bryony, the leader of the resistance in Tyto, along with her fellow resistance fighters. Shard's band joins forces with the group's fighters to defend resistance's headquarters, which is under attack by the Pure Ones. After a lengthy battle against Pure Ones, the resistance's headquarters is struck by lightning and catches fire, forcing the owls to move the owlets protected by the resistance to a new headquarters. Shard and his wingmen protect the carriers against multiple attacks from Pure One forces and ensure all owlets are moved safely to the new base.

A storm rolls in, and Shard is charged with the task of lighting torches which show the way to the new resistance headquarters for members lost in the downpour. Despite Pure One resistance, all paths are lit and the lost owls find their way to the new base. The Pure Ones then set fire to multiple parts of the forest, forcing Shard and his wingmen to protect the water carriers as they put out these fires. After preventing the spread of these fires, the resistance attacks the Pure One's fortress in order to push them out of Tyto Forest. Shard and his allies destroy the fortress, forcing the surviving Pure Ones to retreat.

After the fight, Bryony reveals that while she was held captive by the Pure Ones, she overheard the Pure Ones talking about someone they called "the Guardian", and warns Shard to be careful back at the Ga'Hoole tree. Shard and his band part ways with Bryony and return to the Great Ga'Hoole Tree to report the Pure Ones' forces' defeat.

=== Glauxian Brothers Retreat ===
Later, Ezylryb sends Shard, Parzival, and their band to the Glauxian Brothers Retreat to destroy the Pure Ones's primary source of flecks and aid the brotherhood. They meet a new enemy working with the Pure Ones: Hagsfiends, hideous crossbreeds of owls and crows. After defeating these forces, Shard and his band meet Cormac, an injured hermit who was driven from his home by the same hagsfiends who kidnapped other members of the retreat. Shard and his wingmen rescue monks who are being taken to the hagsfiends' facility, before later attacking the facility head-on by destroying its fleck pillars with hot coals. The attack causes the Hagsfiend Queen to appear out of the icy fog and attack Shard. After defeating the Hagsfiend Queen, Shard learns from Cormac the truth about his father: Instead of betraying Glauxian Monastery, Grettir was actually framed by the real traitor who also masterminded the hagsfiends' attack from the shadows to dishonor him. After revealing the truth, Cormac passes Grettir's battle claws on as a gift of thanks to Shard.

=== The Beaks ===
When Shard and his companions return to the Great Ga'Hoole Tree, he is dismayed to realize that the Guardians have left to confront the Pure Ones without him after Allomere returned. Allomere had brought back a moonblinked owlet, Soren's sister Eglantine, and confirmed the threat of the Pure Ones to owlkind, detailing the loss of his wingmen during the mission. Nevertheless, Shard rallies his friends Parzival, Streak, and Uriah to join the fight and clear the way for Soren's band on their journey to The Beaks. The Guardians' forces are grounded by the powerful and debilitating pull of massive amounts of flecks used in a trap. Before they can be killed, Soren destroys the trap's winch with hot coals, freeing the Guardians.

After reuniting with Ezylrb, Shard aids the Guardians by destroying the defenses of the Stone Palace, the Pure Ones' stronghold. Shard then stumbles upon Allomere, who had just escaped the bats' grasp. It is then that Allomere reveals himself to be the very traitor who dishonored Grettir long ago, all while confirming that he and the latter used to be rivals. Allomere further reveals he also masterminded the murder of Grettir and his mate as well as attempting to turn Shard to the Pure Ones when he was an owlet before being interrupted by an attack by a bat. Though deeply angered by this revelation, Shard put aside his need for revenge to help his fellow guardians by disabling a giant fleck communications tower nearby, which will reduce their ability to call reinforcements during the battle. He then journeys deep into the Stone Place's furnace to destroy the furnace and prevent the Pure Ones from fully arming themselves.

As soon as he destroys the forge Shard finds himself intercepted by Allomere, who lures him to a final battle in the crumbling cavern while vowing that the young Guardian won't escape alive. The two owls fight fiercely, culminating with Shard finally defeating Allomere and sending the traitor plunging into the murky waters below. However, this doesn't stop the traitor who quickly emerges and makes a final attempt on Shard's life, forcing the young owl to hurl Allomere against the nearby rock walls, causing some pieces of ceiling to crush and kill him.

=== Epilogue ===
While reporting his success to Ezylryb, Shard appears disillusioned with his quest. He confides that while he knows he did the right thing, he hasn't found any closure or peace from it. Ezylryb points out that despite how terrible war is, it's worth fighting to protect the Guardians' values of truth and fellowship. He then reminds him of the brainwashed owlets at St. Aegolius. Resolved to see the war through, they fly off to continue the fight.

== Gameplay ==
According to GameSpot, the gameplay is airborne combat. The player locks on to enemy owls or structures, and the player has the option to attack. If the player chooses to do so, the player-controlled owl will "go zooming toward your enemy and wallop it with your claws" as stated in the review. GameSpot also stated that there are some parts where the player has to navigate through gates in a specific amount of time. The player can choose between four owl species to play as before the game starts, each with its own set of advantages and disadvantages. These include barn owl, spotted owl, great gray owl, and great horned owl.

== Soundtrack ==
The original musical soundtrack of the Legend of the Guardians video game was composed by Winifred Phillips and produced by Winnie Waldron. The soundtrack was released on iTunes by WaterTower Music, a division of Warner Bros. Entertainment. The second track on the album, "With Hearts Sublime", is a winner of the 2010 Hollywood Music in Media Award in the category "Best Original Song: Video Game".

== Reception ==
Reception

Aggregate score
Aggregator	Score
Metacritic	X360: 60/100; PS3: 62/100; WII: 54/100; DS: 33/100

Review scores
Publication	Score
Game Informer	X360: 7.25/10
GameSpot	6/10

The Xbox 360, PlayStation 3, and Wii versions received mixed reviews, and the DS version received negative reviews. According to Metacritic, the Xbox 360 version has an average critic score of 60 out of 100 based on 13 reviews. While acknowledging its gameplay and other elements as commendable, the majority of critics noted the game's short play time and replay value as a major pitfall. GameSpot gave the Xbox 360 and PlayStation 3 versions a 6/10 rating. Game Informer awarded it 7.25 out of 10 and said "Though limited in scope and complexity, the game does everything it sets out to do and remains a fun family diversion throughout".
