= Clash of Kings =

- Developer: Elex Tech
- Composer: Winifred Phillips
- Platforms: iOS, iPadOS, Android
- Release: April 27, 2013
- Genre: Strategy
- Mode: Multiplayer

Clash of Kings (CoK) (Chinese: 列王的纷争; pinyin: Liè wáng de fēnzhēng) is a Chinese mobile massively multiplayer online strategy game developed and published by Elex Tech in 2012. The game has been one of the top grossing apps on the App Store (iOS) and Google Play since its release. The game was downloaded more than 65 million times during its first year on the market. The game used to be playable at Facebook platform with shared cross-platform data until the Adobe Flash support was discontinued.

== Celebrity endorsements ==
The game's most notable celebrity endorsement is probably Manchester United's star midfielder Bastian Schweinsteiger. Other celebrity endorsements include Korean pop star Hani, Korean actor and actress So Ji-sub and Son Ye-jin, Chinese-American singer Wang Leehom, and Japanese actor Yōsuke Kubozuka.

== Ban in India ==
In June 2020, the Government of India banned Clash of Kings with 58 other Chinese origin apps, including TikTok, citing data and privacy issues. The border tensions in 2020 between India and China might have also played a role in the ban.
