= God of War (2005 video game) =

Action-adventure game

- North American cover art
- Developer: Santa Monica Studio
- Publisher: Sony Computer Entertainment
- Director: David Jaffe
- Producer: Shannon Studstill
- Designer: David Jaffe
- Programmer: Tim Moss
- Artists: Terry Smith; Steve "Scat" Caterson
- Writers: Marianne Krawczyk; Alexander Stein; David Jaffe; Keith Fay
- Composers: Gerard Marino; Mike Reagan; Ron Fish; Winifred Phillips; Winnie Waldron; Cris Velasco; Marcello De Francisci
- Series: God of War
- Platform: PlayStation 2
- Release: NA: March 22, 2005; EU: July 8, 2005
- Genres: Action-adventure, hack and slash
- Mode: Single-player

God of War is a 2005 action-adventure game developed by Santa Monica Studio and published by Sony Computer Entertainment (SCE). First released for the PlayStation 2 on March 22, 2005, the game is the first installment in the God of War series and the fourth chronologically. Loosely based on Greek mythology, it is set in ancient Greece with vengeance as its central motif. The player controls the protagonist Kratos, a Spartan warrior who serves the Olympian gods. The goddess Athena tasks Kratos with killing Ares, the God of War and Kratos' former mentor who tricked Kratos into killing his wife and daughter. As Ares besieges Athens out of hatred for Athena, Kratos embarks on a quest to find the one object capable of stopping the god once and for all: Pandora's Box.

The gameplay of God of War focuses on combo-based combat, achieved through the player's main weapon—the Blades of Chaos—and a secondary weapon acquired later in the game. It features quick time events that require the player to complete various game controller actions in a timed sequence to defeat stronger enemies and bosses. The player can use up to four magical attacks and a power-enhancing ability as alternative combat options. It also features puzzles and platforming elements.

Upon being released on the PlayStation 2 console God of War was universally acclaimed, being highly praised for its graphics, sound, story, and gameplay and has been cited as one of the greatest video games ever made. Regarded as one of the best action-adventure games for the platform, God of War won several "Game of the Year" awards. In 2009, entertainment website IGN named God of War the seventh-best PlayStation 2 game of all time. The game sold over 4.6 million units by June 2012, making it the 12th best-selling PlayStation 2 game of all time. The success of the game led to the development of eight more games and expansion into other media. The game and its first sequel, God of War II, were remastered and released in November 2009 as the God of War Collection, and in 2012, the remastered version was re-released as part of the God of War Saga, both for the PlayStation 3. God of War Collection was later ported to the PlayStation Vita in 2014. A novelization of the game was published in May 2010, and a film adaptation had been in development for many years but was ultimately canceled. A remake of the original God of War trilogy for the PlayStation 5 was announced in February 2026.

== Gameplay ==
God of War is a third-person single player action-adventure video game with hack and slash elements, viewed from a fixed camera perspective. The player controls the character Kratos in combo-based combat, platforming, and puzzle game elements, and battles Greek mythological foes that include undead soldiers, harpies, minotaurs, Medusa and the Gorgons, cyclopes, wraiths, Sirens, satyrs, centaurs, cerberuses, and boss opponents—the Hydra and a giant minotaur known as Pandora's Guardian. Platforming elements require the player to climb walls and ladders, jump across chasms, swing on ropes, and balance across beams to proceed through sections of the game. Some puzzles are simple, such as moving a box so that the player can use it as a jumping-off point to access a pathway unreachable with normal jumping, but others are more complex, such as finding several items across different areas of the game to unlock one door.

Throughout the game world, the player finds green, blue, and red chests that contain orbs of the corresponding color. Green orbs replenish the player's health, blue orbs replenish magic, and red orbs provide experience for upgrading weapons and magic and replenish the Rage meter, which, if full, allows for the usage of the Rage of the Gods ability. Red orbs are also collected by killing foes and destroying certain inanimate objects. The player can also find Gorgon Eyes and Phoenix Feathers that increase the length of the Health and Magic Meters, respectively.

=== Combat ===
Kratos (in air) attacks the Hydra with the Blades of Chaos. The HUD in the upper left corner displays the Health Meter. The number indicates the number of red orbs the player has collected. The green meter at the bottom of the screen shows the opponent's health.

Kratos' main weapon is the Blades of Chaos: a pair of blades attached to chains wrapped around the character's wrists and forearms. In gameplay, the blades can be swung in various maneuvers. Later in the game, Kratos acquires a secondary weapon called the Blade of Artemis: a large sword that offers alternative combat options. Kratos also learns to use four magical abilities which allow him to kill individual and multiple targets: Zeus' Fury, which allows him to throw lightning bolts at distant targets, Medusa's Gaze, which turns enemies to stone, Poseidon's Rage, which summons lightning from the sky and damaging enemies within its radius, and Army of Hades, which summons souls of the dead to attack enemies. A relic called Poseidon's Trident allows Kratos to breathe underwater and navigate through this environment. Early in the game, Kratos acquires a special ability called Rage of the Gods, which provides temporary invulnerability and increased attack damage.

In combat, a quick time event (QTE) is initiated when the player has weakened a strong foe. The player performs a sequence of actions on the game controller shortly after an image of its circle button appears as an on-screen prompt. This allows for limited control of Kratos during a QTE cinematic sequence, which, if successful, ends the battle; failure usually results in damaging Kratos. Similar in function is a quick time sex mini-game that occurs when Kratos encounters female twins; this became a regular feature throughout the series until God of War: Ghost of Sparta (2010).

When the game is completed, a challenge mode—ten trials called the Challenge of the Gods—is unlocked; this requires players to complete a series of specific tasks. The player may unlock bonus costumes for Kratos, behind-the-scenes videos, and concept art of the characters and environments, as rewards. Completion of each difficulty level unlocks additional rewards.

== Synopsis ==
=== Setting ===
God of War is set in an alternate version of ancient Greece, populated by the Olympian gods, Titans, and other Greek mythological beings. With the exception of flashbacks, the events of the game are set between those of the games Chains of Olympus (2008) and Ghost of Sparta (2010). There are six locations explored, including fictional versions of the real-world Aegean Sea and Athens, and fictional locations such as the Desert of Lost Souls, the Temple of Pandora, the Underworld, and a brief scene on Mount Olympus.

The Aegean Sea setting includes a mass of shipwrecked vessels. Athens is a war-torn city under assault by Ares, the God of War; beyond the city is the Desert of Lost Souls, a vast and windy desert of ancient ruins. The majority of the game occurs in Pandora's Temple, which is chained to the back of the gigantic Titan Cronos, who crawls through the desert. The massive temple, constructed by the architect Pathos Verdes III, is filled with traps and monsters, and has three sections dedicated to the Titan Atlas and gods Poseidon and Hades, respectively. The Underworld is a fiery realm with spiked pillars full of souls and flaming versions of previously encountered enemies. Athens is the scene of the final battle before a denouement on Mount Olympus in the God of War's throne room.

=== Characters ===
The protagonist of the game is Kratos (voiced by Terrence C. Carson), a Spartan warrior who serves the Olympian gods. Other characters include a host of Greek gods, such as Athena (Carole Ruggier), the Goddess of Wisdom and Kratos' ally and mentor; Ares (Steven Blum), the God of War and main antagonist; Poseidon (Fred Tatasciore), the God of the Sea; Aphrodite (Carole Ruggier), the Goddess of Love and Sexuality; Zeus (Paul Eiding), the King of the Gods; Artemis (Claudia Black), the Goddess of the Hunt; and Hades (Nolan North), the God of the Underworld. Several of the gods aid Kratos with magic or weapons. Minor characters include the Oracle of Athens (Susan Blakeslee), the gravedigger (Paul Eiding), the body burner (Christopher Corey Smith), and the boat captain (Keith Ferguson). Other characters appear in flashbacks, including Kratos' wife Lysandra (Gwendoline Yeo), his daughter Calliope, the Barbarian king, and a village Oracle (Susan Blakeslee). The game is narrated by Linda Hunt.

=== Plot ===
Artwork of Ares, the main antagonist

Kratos is a warrior who serves the Greek gods of Olympus. Flashbacks reveal that he was once a successful but bloodthirsty captain in the Spartan army and led his men to several victories before being defeated by a barbarian king. Facing death, Kratos called on the God of War, Ares, whom he promised to serve if the god would spare his men and provide the power to destroy their enemies. Ares agreed and bonded the Blades of Chaos, a pair of chained blades forged in the depths of Tartarus, to his new servant. Kratos, equipped with the blades, then decapitated the barbarian king.

Kratos waged war at the behest of Ares, eventually leading an attack on a village occupied by worshippers of Athena. Unknown to Kratos, Ares had secretly transported Kratos' wife and daughter to the village; during his frenzied attack on its temple, Kratos accidentally killed them in a blind fury. Although Ares believed this act would free Kratos to become the perfect warrior, the horrified and saddened Spartan instead renounced his pledge of servitude to the god and swore vengeance against him. The oracle of the destroyed village cursed Kratos by bonding the ashes of his dead family to his skin, turning it ash-white and earning him the nickname, "Ghost of Sparta". Plagued by nightmares of his horrible deed, Kratos vowed to serve the other gods in hope of ridding himself of the visions.

When the game starts, Kratos has been serving the gods for 10 years. He kills the Hydra on behalf of Poseidon, but he has grown tired of his service and suffering. He summons Athena, who states that if Kratos performs one final act—the murder of Ares—he will be forgiven for killing his family. Ares is waging war on the city of Athens out of hatred of his sister Athena, who assigns Kratos to destroy Ares because Zeus has forbidden divine intervention. Athena guides Kratos to the war-torn Athens. After a strange encounter with a gravedigger who encourages him to continue his task, Kratos battles his way to Athens' oracle, finds her, and learns that the only way to defeat Ares is with Pandora's Box, a mythical artifact that grants the power to kill a god.

Kratos enters the Desert of Lost Souls, and Athena tells him Pandora's Box is hidden in a temple chained to the back of the Titan Cronos—a punishment by Zeus for Cronos' role in the Great War. Kratos summons Cronos, climbs for three days before reaching the Temple entrance, overcomes an array of deadly traps and an army of monsters, and eventually finds the Box. But Ares, aware of his former servant's success, kills Kratos as he is leaving the Temple by hurling a large pillar into him. While harpies take the Box to Ares, Kratos falls into the Underworld. He battles his way through the fiery realm of the dead, and with help from the mysterious gravedigger, who tells him Athena is not the only god watching over him, he escapes and returns to Athens.

Kratos recovers Pandora's Box from Ares, opens it, and uses its power to become godlike and engages Ares in a fierce battle. Despite Ares' best efforts to destroy Kratos physically and mentally, including stripping him of all weapons and magic and then forcing him to relive his family's death, Kratos overcomes and kills Ares with the Blade of the Gods, a giant sword that was being used as an ornamental bridge to Athens. The city is saved, and Athena tells Kratos that although his sins are forgiven, the gods cannot erase his nightmares. Forsaken by the gods, he tries to commit suicide by casting himself into the Aegean Sea, but Athena intervenes and transports him to Mount Olympus. As a reward for his services to the gods, Athena provides Kratos with a new set of blades and the seat as the new God of War where he watches over all the world's wars throughout history.

== Development ==
Sony's Santa Monica Studio began development of God of War in 2002, under the working title Dark Odyssey, and unveiled it two years later at SCEA Santa Monica Gamers' Day 2004. Game director and creator David Jaffe said that while the idea for God of War was his own, the concept owed a debt to Capcom because he had played Onimusha and said "let's do that with Greek Mythology". He was inspired in part by the 1981 film Clash of the Titans, saying, "the real high concept for me was ... merging it with Heavy Metal magazine". He said he liked both "the kids stuff ... with Greek Mythology" and the idea of adding more adult themes such as sex and violence. The development team gave themselves "lots of freedom" to modify the myths, and Jaffe said they took the "coolest aspects of the subject" and wrote a story using those elements. Director of visual development and lead concept artist, Charlie Wen, drew inspiration from classic films like Clash of the Titans as well as more contemporary films, such as Gladiator (2000), for tonal inspiration to lead the visual design of Kratos, other characters, and the world of God of War.

The game uses Santa Monica's Kinetica engine, which they developed for their previous game, Kinetica (2001). For God of War, Jaffe said the creative team's goal was to "make the player feel brutal, letting their inner beast free and just going nuts". He also said the game's combat system would have an unparalleled degree of freedom. The team designed two systems of combat: a "macro" system, which gives players the choice between normal combat, magical attacks, or using the QTE feature to kill a foe; and a "micro" system, where players press a sequence of buttons to perform different attacks. The developers said there would be 15 to 25 different attacks with the player's main weapon in the final game, with a free-form combo system that would allow players to combine moves in almost any order. The gameplay was described "as merging the action of Devil May Cry with the puzzle-solving of Ico" and that players would be able to "sunder enemies with a single move, such as by ripping them in half". Santa Monica designed different types of puzzles for the game, including self-contained ones that incorporate up to three rooms of the game, and global puzzles that spread across four or five areas. Jaffe compared the game to the popular Prince of Persia series—which also incorporates puzzle and platforming elements—and said that while each puzzle in that series is a slight variation of the last, "each puzzle in God of War is its own beast". According to Eurogamer, the gameplay of Capcom's 1989 arcade game Strider was also a vital influence on God of War.

Sony gave Jaffe nearly complete creative control to develop the game on his terms with a substantial budget. Jaffe wanted to make the game "out of passion, not fear, and that it would be a game that [Jaffe], as a game player, would want to play". Jaffe said the 1981 film Raiders of the Lost Ark also inspired the development of God of War; he wanted to make players feel like he felt as a child watching that film, but did not want to put the player in the role of an adventurer, referencing The Legend of Zelda games. He elaborated that God of War was designed to be simplistic and forward-moving, but the game "[was] not innovative or unique, and [that was] intentional". Jaffe said that their system was shallow and "it forced the team to constantly create new content to trapeze the player from one area of interest to the next". He said he understood modular game design—the need to have great looking, high-detail levels without having to build and texture every minuscule piece of the environment—but "[he] was going to get bored" if they did not step outside of those boundaries.

Jaffe confirmed the game would be a cinematic presentation. He said that at the 2004 Electronic Entertainment Expo (E3), they got to see where players were having issues with the camera system and said, "we are doing extensive focus tests, and using data compiled from E3, to find and fix the problem areas" of the cameras. He said he had the confidence that the team would fix the problems before the game's release. However, he said if players "hate cinematic camera systems, nothing we can do will help you like the God of War cameras". For about three months during early development, Jaffe had seriously considered doing the game from the first-person perspective. This consideration came from the Dreamcast game Maken X as he said it was one of the "few games where I saw melee combat done well in a first-person perspective". After seeing presentations of Ico and Devil May Cry at a D.I.C.E. Summit in Las Vegas, Jaffe and lead programmer Tim Moss ultimately decided to focus on the third-person camera as Jaffe felt the first-person view would not have the "kind of emotion and combat and character building that I was hoping to do".

== Release ==
The demo of God of War, entitled God of War: The Hydra Battle, was released on January 1, 2005. It featured Kratos battling various opponents and ended with a portion of the Hydra battle that opens the main game. The game was released on March 22 in North America, July 8 in the United Kingdom, and November 17 in Japan.

=== Remastered port ===
The game and its first sequel, God of War II, were released in North America on November 17, 2009, as part of the God of War Collection, featuring remastered ports of both games for the PlayStation 3 platform, with improved graphics and support for PlayStation 3 Trophies. It became available in Japan on March 18, 2010, Australia on April 29, and the UK on April 30. God of War Collection was released as a digital download on the PlayStation Store on November 2, 2010, and was the first product containing PlayStation 2 software available via download. PlayStation Plus subscribers could download a one-hour trial of each game. By June 2012, God of War Collection had sold more than 2.4 million copies worldwide. A PlayStation Vita version of God of War Collection was released on May 6, 2014. On August 28, 2012, God of War Collection, God of War III, and God of War: Origins Collection were included in the God of War Saga, under Sony's line of PlayStation Collections for the PlayStation 3 in North America.

=== Remake ===
During the February 2026 State of Play presentation on February 12, TC Carson—the voice of Kratos in the original Greek-era trilogy—announced that remakes of God of War, God of War II, and God of War III were in development for the PlayStation 5. The project, titled God of War Trilogy Remake, was described as being in early development at the time of its announcement.

== Reception ==
Reception

Aggregate score
Aggregator	Score
Metacritic	94/100

Review scores
Publication	Score
1Up.com	A+
Eurogamer	9/10
GamePro	4.5/5 stars
GameSpot	9.3/10
GameSpy	5/5 stars
GamesRadar+	5/5 stars
IGN	9.8/10

God of War received "universal acclaim" from critics, according to review aggregator website Metacritic. Tom Lane of CNN wrote, "God of War is the type of game that makes you remember why you play games in the first place." He said it is addictive and the action is balanced with a modest amount of puzzle and platforming elements. He praised how quickly it progresses and said it "is one of the most violent [games] on the market".

Raymond Padilla of GameSpy said the gameplay is "excellent" and it has "some of the goriest, most exaggerated, and over-the-top violence I've ever seen". He praised the combo system for being generous, with players easily able to execute attack combinations, but added that it can challenge players who "throw themselves into the system". Chris Sell of PALGN wrote that the most enjoyable aspect of the combat is its simplicity. He said the QTEs are "superbly enjoyable", "highly satisfying", and most entertaining during boss fights. In regards to combining combat with platforming, Sell said, "God of War pulls it off perfectly."

Lane said the story is "compelling", while Sell stated that it is well laid out and rarely stalls. Padilla wrote, "God of War is the best thing to happen to Greek mythology" since Harry Hamlin played Perseus in Clash of the Titans. He praised the sound as very strong, but felt that some of the voice acting and music tracks are overstated. Kristan Reed of Eurogamer said the audio is "a stunningly evocative example of a well-judged dramatic soundtrack and thunderous effects".

Sell stated that the graphics are "quite possibly the best on the PS2" and rival games on the Xbox. He said the character models are "excellent" and each level has its own distinctive feel. Eric Blattberg of PlayStation Universe praised the graphics for being seamless, realistic, and capable of being able to run at 480p on a widescreen television. He said the textures are "great", and the environments are "stunning and unbelievably detailed." Mikel Reparaz of GamesRadar noted the amount of detail, elaborating that as a consequence of the aging hardware of the PS2, "the graphics occasionally stutter or even slow down." He still gave the game a perfect score, concluding, "these problems are minor nits next to God of War's creative design, riveting plot and sheer balls-out fun. One of the best action titles on the PS2, God of War stands out as an ultraviolent masterpiece."

Sell said God of War has very few flaws and that the only one worth mentioning is the camera system: he said that although the cameras do a great job of following Kratos, "there are a fair few annoying moments when you're attacked by something off-screen, or you fail to make a jump because you couldn't really see the jump properly". Other minor complaints from Sell include its lack of replayability, the amount of time it takes to upgrade items, and the final fight with Ares, which he said is "a little disappointing". Reed wrote that in a few notable occasions, he found some of the platforming balancing acts "a little bothersome". He said players may be overwhelmed by the number of enemies, but they will eventually get their "brain and reactions in gear and move onto the next gripping section and feel hugely satisfied".

=== Sales ===
By the end of July, God of War was the sixth-best-selling game of 2005 up to that point. On March 1, 2006, it became available in the PlayStation 2 lineup of Greatest Hits. By July 2006, the game had sold 1 million units and earned $43 million in the United States alone. Next Generation ranked it as the 50th highest-selling game launched for the PlayStation 2, Xbox, or GameCube between January 2000 and July 2006 in that country. In June 2012, Sony reported that the game had sold over 4.6 million units.

=== Awards and accolades ===
God of War won several "Game of the Year" awards. At the 2005 Spike Video Game Awards, it was named "Best Action Game" and David Jaffe won "Designer of the Year" for the game; it was also a nominee for "Game of the Year", "Best Performance by a Human Male" (TC Carson as Kratos), and "Best Original Score". At the 9th Annual Interactive Achievement Awards (now known as the D.I.C.E. Awards), God of War won the most awards of the ceremony, including: "Overall Game of the Year", "Console Game of the Year", "Action/Adventure Game of the Year", "Outstanding Achievement in Animation", "Outstanding Achievement in Original Musical Composition", "Outstanding Achievement in Sound Design", and "Outstanding Character Performance - Male" for Carson's portrayal. In 2009, IGN named God of War the seventh-best PlayStation 2 game of all time. In November 2012, Complex magazine named God of War the eleventh-best PlayStation 2 game of all time, and placed it sixteenth on the list made again in 2022.

== Other media ==
=== Soundtrack ===
God of War: Original Soundtrack from the Video Game

Soundtrack album by Various composers
- Released: March 1, 2005
- Genre: Contemporary classical music
- Length: 58:55
- Label: Sony Computer Entertainment

God of War: Original Soundtrack from the Video Game, composed by Gerard K. Marino, Ron Fish, Winifred Phillips, Mike Reagan, Cris Velasco, Winnie Waldron, and Marcello De Francisci, was released on CD by Sony Computer Entertainment as an exclusive product for the Sony Connect Music Store on March 1, 2005. The soundtrack was also made available for free to customers who purchased the game via a voucher code included with the game. Several of the tracks feature voice-over passages from the video game. Dave Valentine of Square Enix Music Online rated it 8 out of 10 and praised the composers for avoiding the production of "a neverending dullness of action themes". He complimented the soundtrack for having "a large number of well-developed orchestral themes, with a noticeable creative use of ancient and ethnic instrumentation". Spence D. of IGN gave the soundtrack 6.9 out of 10 and also praised the use of ancient and ethnic instrumentation, but criticized the uneven transitions between tracks. In March 2010, the soundtrack was released as downloadable content as part of the God of War Trilogy Soundtrack in the God of War III Ultimate Edition.

=== Novel ===
God of War
- Author: Matthew Stover; Robert E. Vardeman
- Language: English
- Series: God of War
- Genre: Action, Adventure
- Publisher: Del Rey Books
- Publication date: May 25, 2010
- Publication place: United States
- Media type: Paperback
- ISBN: 978-0-345-50867-6

An official novelization of the game, titled God of War, was announced in July 2009, along with a novelization of God of War II. It was written by Matthew Stover and Robert E. Vardeman, and was published on May 25, 2010, by Del Rey Books. In an interview for Play magazine, Vardeman said a mythology book written in the 1930s got him interested in Greek mythology, and the chance to work on the God of War novel "was an opportunity not to be missed". He said giving the readers a solid plot foundation was necessary and the novel required extra material so that it did not simply follow the action of the game. Although he had not played the game, he said God of War was based on the traditional Edith Hamilton Greek mythology, essentially "the accepted mythology on steroids". Vardeman called Kratos a substantial character, continuing, "This conflict of motives makes him a great, if troubled, hero." He confirmed his work on the second God of War novel, saying there are many potential story ideas for Kratos and that "it would be a shame" if there were not additional books to fill in the details of his quests, such as stories of the time while he was a minion of Ares or before he met the Barbarian King. God of War was nominated for the International Association of Tie-in Writers Scribe Award as best adapted novel in 2010.

The novel recounts the events of the game and offers deeper insights into its story, explaining that Athena wanted Kratos to kill Ares and explaining how she manipulated the other gods, with the exception of Zeus, into aiding Kratos. After learning of Athena's plans, Zeus decides to aid Kratos (with magic and as the gravedigger) with the intention of Kratos becoming the new God of War after killing Ares. Poseidon is persuaded by Athena when she convinces him that Ares brought the Hydra into his domain. Artemis is persuaded because Ares and his minions are destroying her wilderness and its wildlife, and by aiding Kratos she will prevent future destruction. Athena manipulates Aphrodite into believing that Medusa is plotting against her. Hades, however, is omitted from the book, as Kratos does not meet him or gain his magic. Another omission from the book is Kratos receiving a new set of blades from Athena, and the Blades of Chaos is revealed to have been forged by Hephaestus in Tartarus.

The god Hermes is not in the game, but in the novel, he is responsible for informing Athena that Kratos is committing suicide. New characters include Coeus, the First Officer of Kratos' ship, and the two servants of Medusa: Jurr and a blind man. The twins encountered in the sex mini-game are revealed to be the daughters of Aphrodite named Zora and Lora. The book also explains how certain creatures of the mythology that were slain by heroes are, apparently, still alive. For example, Zeus recollects that Hercules slew the Hydra, and Athena confirms this, but informs Zeus that the new Hydra is a newborn spawn of the Titans Typhon and Echidna, and was released by Ares.

=== Canceled live-action film ===
A live-action film adaptation was announced in 2005. Jaffe confirmed that a script had been completed by David Self and they were looking for a director. Universal Studios was committed to making the film, but Jaffe, unaware of its status, eventually expressed doubt the film would be released. In September 2008, Brett Ratner told UGO that he would direct the film, but in February 2009, it was revealed that he had left the project to direct 2011's Tower Heist. In March 2010, Santa Monica confirmed that they had no creative control over the film. During the God of War – Game Directors Live documentary, filmed on September 1, 2010, Jaffe said the "script went out a year and a half ago to Daniel Craig, who plays [James] Bond, but he turned it down." He indicated an actor had since signed on for the role of Kratos, and said, "this new person is pretty good, if that ends up true."

In July 2012, The Hollywood Reporter confirmed that two of the writers of Pacific Rim (2013) and several of the Saw films, Patrick Melton and Marcus Dunstan, had been hired to adapt God of War into a film. Melton and Dunstan told IGN that they were hired to rework Self's screenplay as it was considered to be outdated, being written before recent films in the same genre, such as Clash of the Titans (2010) and its sequel, Wrath of the Titans (2012). They said they wanted to humanize Kratos, who would begin as a mortal and still have his family, with the pivotal change being the barbarian attack. Melton added, "We're going to learn about [Kratos] and understand how he operates. So it's potentially 30 minutes ... of building up this character so that, when he ... becomes the Ghost of Sparta, we understand him as a human and ... the journey that he's going to take." According to Dunstan, "with a bigger movie like God of War, you have to go quite a bit deeper into the character as opposed to a horror film." Melton and Dunstan also said they had "big plans" for Ares, who "[would] become a more proactive villain" beyond his raid of Athens. In November 2012, the writers told GameSpot that God of War would "improve on films like Clash of the Titans and Immortals by taking a step in a bolder direction." Melton said that Sony "encouraged" them to make it different from other films in the same genre. It was also confirmed that Charles Roven and Alex Gartner, the producers of the Uncharted film, would be producing the God of War film via Atlas Entertainment. A script had been "turned in" and the film had a budget of US$150 million.

In early 2013, God of War: Ascension's Game Director, Todd Papy, was questioned on the film's status, but he was unaware. The main writer behind the Greek-based God of War games (2005–2013), Marianne Krawczyk, said her main worry with the movie adaptation was casting Kratos due to players' connection with the video game version, as there would be a different actor with a different voice portraying the character, who would presumably have more spoken lines than the Kratos in the games. Following the release of 2018's God of War, with no further updates regarding the original game's film, rumors about a potential adaptation of the newer Norse mythology-based game began circulating, but in May 2021, a Sony spokesperson confirmed that there was no film adaptation for any God of War in development. However, during an investor briefing the following year, Sony Interactive Entertainment president Jim Ryan confirmed that a television series adaptation was in development for Amazon Prime Video, but it would adapt Kratos' story from the Norse-based games.
