= Assassin's Creed III: Liberation =

2012 video game

- Developer: Ubisoft Sofia
- Publisher: Ubisoft
- Director: Julian Gollop
- Producer: Martin Capel
- Writers: Richard Farrese; Jill Murray
- Composers: Winifred Phillips; Music produced by Winnie Waldron
- Series: Assassin's Creed
- Engine: AnvilNext
- Platforms: PlayStation Vita; PlayStation 3 Microsoft Windows; Xbox 360; PlayStation 4 Xbox One; Nintendo Switch; Google Stadia
- Release: Liberation: PlayStation Vita; NA: October 30, 2012; EU: October 31, 2012; AU: October 31, 2012; JP: November 15, 2012; Liberation HD: PlayStation 3; NA: January 14, 2014; EU: January 15, 2014; AU: January 15, 2014; Windows, Xbox 360; WW: January 15, 2014; Stadia; WW: December 14, 2021; Liberation Remastered: Windows, PS4, Xbox One; WW: March 29, 2019; Nintendo Switch; WW: May 21, 2019; Stadia; WW: December 14, 2021
- Genres: Action-adventure, stealth
- Modes: Single-player; Multiplayer (original release only)

Assassin's Creed III: Liberation (released in Japan as Assassin's Creed III: Lady Liberty) is a 2012 action-adventure video game developed by Ubisoft Sofia and published by Ubisoft Entertainment. Part of the Assassin's Creed series, it is a spin-off to Assassin's Creed III, and was originally released for the PlayStation Vita on October 30, 2012, in North America, with a worldwide launch the following day.

The game's plot is set within a fictional history of real-world events and follows the millennia-old struggle between the Assassins, who fight to preserve peace and free will, and the Templars, who desire peace through control. The story is set in late 18th-century French Louisiana, from 1765 to 1777, and focuses on the life of French Assassin Aveline de Grandpré, the series' first female protagonist, as she fights the Templars' attempts to gain control of New Orleans after the end of the French and Indian War. The game takes place within an open world and is presented from the third-person perspective, with a primary focus on using Aveline's combat, stealth, and parkour abilities to complete missions and explore the environment.

The original release of Liberation received mixed reviews from critics, who praised its setting and protagonist, but disliked the narrative's execution and certain aspects of the gameplay, while feeling that the title was limited by its status as a spin-off. A fully remade version of the game, titled Assassin's Creed: Liberation HD, was released in January 2014 for the PlayStation 3, Xbox 360 and Microsoft Windows via the PlayStation Network, Xbox Live Arcade and Steam, respectively. A remastered version of Liberation HD was released as part of Assassin's Creed III Remastered for Xbox One, PlayStation 4, Windows, and the Nintendo Switch in 2019.

== Gameplay ==
Assassin's Creed III: Liberation retains the "franchise's trademark open world and gameplay", while making use of the PlayStation Vita's touchscreen and rear touch pad, cameras and gyroscope. The player character, Aveline de Grandpré, controls similarly to other Assassin protagonists of the series, being able to free run, use 'social stealth', and fight enemies using a counter-based combat system. Because the game uses the same engine as Assassin's Creed III, most of the animations from that game are reused. However, Aveline does have several unique animations, as well as the ability to dual-wield weapons, such as the new blowpipe and the familiar swords, knives, pistols and Hidden Blades.

New gameplay mechanics exclusive to Liberation include a Chain Kill ability, which allows Aveline to chain attacks together to kill multiple enemies at once; a trade system, in which Aveline manages her father's trade network by purchasing goods and selling them to other cities overseas; and the ability to switch between Aveline's three distinct personas, each providing its own advantages and disadvantages. For example, the Assassin persona performs better in combat, but is very quickly detected by enemies; the Slave persona can blend in with other slaves or carry crates to pass by suspicious enemies, but has access to fewer weapons; and the Lady persona can charm or bribe guards to enter restricted areas and is detected slower than the other personas, but cannot free run.

The multiplayer component, exclusive to the original PlayStation Vita version, consists of players tapping nodes on a map and using characters (represented with static portraits) to capture bases and collect supplies. This differs from the series' traditional competitive multiplayer modes, which had players assassinating each other for sport.

== Synopsis ==
=== Setting ===
Like Assassin's Creed III, the game is set in 18th-century Colonial America; however, whereas the former primarily focused on the Thirteen Colonies under British rule, Liberation centers on the French colony of Louisiana, during its administration by Spain in the aftermath of the French and Indian War. The story of the game follows the life of an Afro-French Assassin named Aveline de Grandpré, the first female protagonist of the series. Born to a wealthy French father and an African slave mother, Aveline is part of New Orleans' social elite, but despite her noble upbringing, she has secretly dedicated herself to freeing oppressed slaves, as well as eradicating Templar presence in the city. Aveline's story spans twelve years of her life, from 1765 to 1777, and takes place alongside the events of Assassin's Creed III. Much of the game takes place within New Orleans and the bayou that surrounds it, although several other locations connected to the Seven Years' War and the American Revolutionary War are also included.

Liberation incorporates several elements from American history into its plot, like the tragic mulattos, the anti-miscegenation laws in the United States, the back-to-Africa movement, and education during the Slave Period. Similarly to other games in the series, it also features a number of characters based on historical figures, including Jean-Jacques Blaise d'Abbadie, Antonio de Ulloa, François Mackandal, and Gilbert Antoine de Saint-Maxent.

The game setting has been described as one of the very few depictions of historical French Louisiana in video games.

=== Plot ===
In the modern day, Abstergo Entertainment, a subsidiary of Abstergo Industries that produces multimedia goods, has released their first major product, Liberation—a video game about the life of the Assassin Aveline de Grandpré. The hacker group Erudito contacts the player during their playthrough and reveals that a heavy amount of censoring was done in regard to the Assassin-Templar war, offering to help them learn the truth.

The player begins experiencing the life of Aveline in 1765, as she operates within New Orleans from her family mansion, which she lives in alongside her father, Philippe Olivier de Grandpré, and stepmother, Madeleine de L'Isle. As the city undergoes a transition of control from France to Spain at the end of the French and Indian War, Aveline uncovers a plot to control Louisiana, orchestrated by the Templar Rafael Joaquín de Ferrer. To counter this, she assassinates two men assisting de Ferrer: French governor Jean-Jacques Blaise d'Abbadie, and Baptiste, a former Assassin impersonating his late Mentor François Mackandal.

In 1768, Aveline's mentor Agaté orders her to assassinate Antonio de Ulloa, Louisiana's new Spanish governor and a Templar, who has been imposing strict trading restrictions, setting up a covert slave-trading operation, and allowing French officials to continue operating in the city. As Ulloa attempts to flee New Orleans amidst a rebellion against his regime, Aveline attacks him, but spares his life upon learning the slaves sent out of the city were assigned to a Templar excavation site in Chichén Itzá. Against Agaté's orders, Aveline heads to Chichén Itzá in disguise, where she encounters her mother Jeanne, who mysteriously disappeared during Aveline's youth. She also finds de Ferrer and learns that he has been ordered by his superior, the "Company Man", to use the slaves to excavate the ruins in search of a First Civilization temple. Aveline enters the temple before de Ferrer, kills him, and retrieves one piece of an artifact called the Prophecy Disk. Jeanne, fearing that Agaté sent Aveline to kill her for stealing an artifact from the Assassins—a locket she gifted to Aveline—warns her daughter not to give him the Disk.

In 1771, following Aveline's return to New Orleans, her friend and fellow Assassin Gérald Blanc informs her of a Templar named Diego Vázquez who has been attempting to take control of the Louisiana bayou. Learning that Agaté is in danger, Aveline repels Vázquez's men. A year later, she returns to Chichén Itzá, where she reunites with Jeanne and forgives her for her abandonment. After helping Aveline recover the second half of the Prophecy Disk, Jeanne stays behind to protect the area from further Templar incursions. In 1776, Aveline returns to New Orleans and commits herself to liberating slaves. When Madeleine learns of her stepdaughter's work, she asks her to help a former slave, George Davidson, escape to the north so that he may join the Continental Army. During this time, Aveline assassinates Vázquez, but learns that he is not the Company Man as she assumed, while her father Philippe mysteriously falls ill and dies.

In 1777, Gérald informs Aveline of a Loyalist officer operating in New York who might know the Company Man's identity. With the help of fellow Assassin Connor, Aveline finds and kills the officer, revealed to be Davidson, who claims that the Company Man "has been in her own backyard all along". Deducing Madeleine is the Company Man and was responsible for both Jeanne's disappearance and Phillippe's death, Aveline returns to New Orleans and confronts her stepmother. Madeleine admits that she has been grooming Aveline to become a Templar, and asks her to kill Agaté as a final test. Aveline goes to warn him, but Agaté, believing Aveline has betrayed the Assassins, attacks her. After Aveline defeats him, a guilt-ridden and ashamed Agaté commits suicide.

Aveline meets with Madeleine at the St. Louis Cathedral to be initiated into the Templar Order, and gives her the Prophecy Disk. Madeleine is unable to activate it and realizes it is missing a component. Aveline then reveals her true intentions and kills Madeleine and the other attending Templars, before connecting her locket to the Disk. This unlocks a holographic recording showing the election of Eve as the leader of the human rebellion against the First Civilization.

== Release ==
Assassin's Creed III: Liberation was released on October 30, 2012, the same day as Assassin's Creed III. The game is available in a PlayStation Vita bundle pack with a new crystal white Wi-Fi Vita and a 4GB memory card. In Japan it was released under the title Assassin's Creed III: Lady Liberty.

It was announced on September 10, 2013, that the game would be re-released as Assassin's Creed: Liberation HD for PlayStation 3, Xbox 360 and Microsoft Windows via the PlayStation Network, Xbox Live Arcade and Steam, respectively, in 2014. The new version features visuals closer to Assassin's Creed III as well as updated audio, AI and facial animations. Additional missions have been added while some of the Vita-specific touch screen missions and the multiplayer mode have been removed. The game was released on the PlayStation 3 on January 14, 2014, in North America and January 15, 2014, in Europe. The Microsoft Windows and Xbox 360 versions were released worldwide on January 15, 2014.

It was announced on September 13, 2018, that Assassin’s Creed III Remastered would be included in the Assassin's Creed: Odyssey season pass. Remastered was announced to include all of its original DLC and a remastered version of Assassin's Creed III: Liberation. The remastered games feature graphical enhancements using a new graphics engine and improved gameplay mechanics. They were released for Xbox One, PlayStation 4, and Windows in March 2019, and for the Nintendo Switch in May 2019.

On July 11, 2022, Assassin's Creed: Liberation HD was removed from purchase on Steam. Furthermore, it was announced that all DLC and online features would subsequently be inaccessible to players after September 1, 2022.

=== Additional content ===
Purchasing Assassin's Creed III for the PlayStation 3 allowed players to link it with Liberation on the PlayStation Vita to unlock several in-game bonuses, including an exclusive mission from the point of view of Assassin's Creed III's protagonist Connor, a multiplayer character skin, Connor's signature tomahawk, and an upgrade to all ammunition pouches. There was also a promotional DLC, titled Mysteries of the Bayou Pack, that came with pre-orders of the game in PAL regions. It includes an exclusive weapon, an alligator hunting hat, a multiplayer skin, and an upgrade to the poison dart pouch.

All the additional content is included in Liberation HD and Liberation Remastered, with the exception of the multiplayer skins, as that feature has been removed.

== Music ==
Assassin's Creed 3: Liberation (Original Game Soundtrack)

Soundtrack album by Winifred Phillips
- Released: October 30, 2012
- Genre: Video game soundtrack
- Label: Ubisoft Music
- Producer: Winnie Waldron

Professional ratings
Review scores
| Source | Rating |
|---|---|
| ArtasticGaming.com | A+ |
| GSoundtracks.com | 4/4 stars |
| MundoBSO.com | 4/5 stars |
| FilmMusicMedia.com | 3.5/4 stars |

The music in the game was composed by Winifred Phillips and produced by Winnie Waldron. The soundtrack album was released by Ubisoft Music on the same day as the release of the Assassin's Creed III: Liberation video game, October 30, 2012. Together with music producer Winnie Waldron, Winifred Phillips won several awards for her work on this project. For the music composition of the Assassin's Creed III Liberation video game, Phillips won a Global Music Award for musical excellence. Composer Winifred Phillips and music producer Winnie Waldron won a 2012 Hollywood Music in Media Award for the music score for Assassin's Creed III: Liberation. The main theme music of the Assassin's Creed III: Liberation video game won a G.A.N.G. Award from the Game Audio Network Guild in the category of "Best Original Vocal Song — Choral."' The music of Assassin's Creed III Liberation won a GameFocus Award for Best Music of 2012. The game's musical score also received nominations in several year-end award competitions, including the GameZone Awards, the Best of IGN Awards, and the G4TV X-Play Best of 2012 Awards.

The music of Assassin's Creed III Liberation was very well received by both game and music critics. Robert Workman of GameZone wrote, "The music is superb," and Evan Narcisse of Kotaku called the soundtrack, "a stealthy success." Jen Bosier of VideoGameWriters said that the music of Assassin's Creed III Liberation was "without question, the best soundtrack the series has seen to date." Music critic Randall Larson of BuySoundtrax.com stated, "This is a fine score and one that even non-gamers should applaud for its cinematic, dynamic and immersive drive." Reviewer Lucas Smith of Piki Geek asserted that "the soundtrack will go down as one of the year's best."

Assassin's Creed III Liberation video game soundtrack
| No. | Title | Length |
|---|---|---|
| 1. | "Liberation Main Theme" | 2:01 |
| 2. | "Stealth" | 2:11 |
| 3. | "Virtual Pursuit" | 2:12 |
| 4. | "The Docks" | 2:02 |
| 5. | "Abstergo Ops" | 3:43 |
| 6. | "Secrets of the Bayou" | 2:02 |
| 7. | "Poverty" | 2:10 |
| 8. | "Aveline's Escape" | 3:36 |
| 9. | "Society Suite in 4 Movements" | 7:16 |
| 10. | "Ride to Oblivion" | 2:12 |
| 11. | "Mayan Labyrinth" | 2:04 |
| 12. | "Chasing Freedom" | 2:19 |
| 13. | "The Hunt" | 2:13 |
| 14. | "Bayou Fortress" | 2:00 |
| 15. | "Safe Harbor" | 2:07 |
| 16. | "Shanty Town" | 2:01 |
| 17. | "Deliverance" | 2:27 |
| 18. | "Winter in the North" | 2:04 |
| 19. | "The Cathedral Grounds" | 2:05 |
| 20. | "Animus" | 2:27 |
| 21. | "In the Bayou" | 2:23 |
| 22. | "Mayan Ruins" | 2:03 |
| 23. | "River of the Mayans" | 2:35 |
| 24. | "Agate's Power" | 3:26 |
| 25. | "In the Service of Humanity" | 3:11 |
| 26. | "Virtual Reality Room" | 3:26 |

== Reception ==
Reception

Aggregate score
| Aggregator | Score |
|---|---|
| Metacritic | VITA: 70/100; PS3: 64/100; PC: 66/100; X360: 62/100 |

Review scores
| Publication | Score |
|---|---|
| G4 | 3.5/5 |
| Game Informer | 7.75/10 |
| GameSpot | 6.5/10 |
| IGN | 7.2/10 |

The PlayStation Vita version of Assassin's Creed III: Liberation received "mixed or average reviews", according to review aggregator Metacritic.

Shaun McInnis, reviewer for GameSpot, gave the game a score of 6.5/10, praising the protagonist as "...a woman born from the romance between a wealthy father and a slave mother, someone who has overcome her uncertain upbringing to find a new life in the Assassin Brotherhood". McInnis also commended the setting, writing "...a brilliant version of 18th-century New Orleans, one that beautifully reflects the diverse cultural ambience formed over years of operating as a French trading port". However, he also wrote that the game "squanders its most unique ideas...Liberation takes little advantage of its own narrative format" and that the plot is "largely aimless and hastily delivered".

IGN's Greg Miller stated, "The moves and kills you'd expect are here, but the story is boiled down to be easy to jump in and out of. That takes away some of the excitement in playing through it", giving it 7.2/10. In April 2020, Game Informer ranked the game as the 13th best game in the Assassin's Creed series to date, the lowest entry on the list.
