= The Dark Eye: Book of Heroes =

2020 video game

- Developer: Random Potion
- Publisher: Wild River Games
- Series: The Dark Eye
- Platform: Microsoft Windows
- Release: 9 June 2020
- Genre: Role-playing
- Modes: Single-player, multiplayer

The Dark Eye: Book of Heroes (German: Das Schwarze Auge: Book of Heroes) is a role-playing video game developed by Finnish studio Random Potion and published by Wild River Games for Microsoft Windows. It is set in the world of The Dark Eye by Ulisses Spiele. The game was released on 9 June 2020, and received mostly average to negative reviews, though it was said to be quite an accurate representation of the tabletop role-playing experience of The Dark Eye.
