= Francis Pollock =

Canadian science fiction writer

Francis Lillie Pollock (February 4, 1876 – February 6, 1957) was an early twentieth-century Canadian science fiction writer. He was born in Huron County, Ontario, Canada in 1876. He wrote 'commercial fiction' under the pseudonym Frank L. Pollock, western or adventure fiction under the name Frank Lillie Pollock, and literary fiction under his own name. Some of Pollock's early commercial fiction can be found in The Youth's Companion. He also regularly published short stories and poetry in Munsey's Magazine, The Smart Set, The Atlantic, The Bookman (New York) and The Blue Jay (renamed in 1905 as Canadian Woman Magazine).

The sale of a serialised novel, The Treasure Trail, enabled him to leave his job at the Toronto Mail and Empire in 1907 to pursue a full-time writing career. Pollock's writing career was pursued in tandem with a life of beekeeping. Many of his fictions are influenced by bees. Pollock kept an apiary in Shedden, Ontario and farmed commercially. He and his second wife, Zella Taylor retired to Georgetown, Ontario.

Pollock is the author of the short story "Finis", published in the June 1906 issue of The Argosy magazine, and his work has been anthologized several times. Briefly, "Finis" is the story of a new star that is discovered which turns out to be a new, hotter sun. It is a short hard hitting story which shows a man and woman, who stay up the night to watch the expected new star arise. Though written in 1906, it is set in the future of the mid 20th century. Pollock also wrote several science fiction stories for The Black Cat magazine as well as sea stories for magazines such as Adventure.

In 1930, he was living in Shedden, Ontario, Canada.

== Bibliography ==
=== Novels ===
- The Treasure Trail (1906)
- The Frozen Fortune (1910)
- Northern Diamonds (1917) Originally serialised in The Youth's Companion magazine.
- Wilderness Honey (1917) Originally serialised in The Youth's Companion magazine.
- The Woods-Rider (1922)
- The Timber Treasure (1923)
- The Glacier Gate (1926)
- Rainbow Landing (1926)
- Honey of Danger (1927)
- Mirador Treasure (1927)
- Bitter Honey (1935)
- Jupiter Eight (1936)

=== Short stories ===
- The Man Who Ran Europe (1898)
- The Iron Star (1898)
- The Lady and the Kwang-Chiu (1899)
- The Stolen Sky-Scraper (1899)
- The Bird from Cape Horn (1899)
- At Tank Number Eleven (1900)
- Dr. Gilbert’s Seven-Dollar Bill (with James D. Ellsworth) (1900)
- The Pei Ho Privateers (1901)
- The Wildcat Mine (1901)
- What the Little Rifle Did (1901)
- When the Green Sun Went Down (1901)
- The Invisible City (1901)
- The Man from Beyond (1901)
- The Red Pack (1901)
- In the World’s Gate (1901)
- Into the Jaws of Danger (1902)
- Where the Trail Broke (1902)
- His Own Petard (1902)
- Where Death Was Made (1902)
- The Bayou Pirates (1902)
- On the Up Grade (1902)
- The Invisible River (1902)
- The Resurrection of Jules (1902)
- Trapped by the Tong (1903)
- When the Luck Turned (1903)
- The Drugging of Ephraim (1903)
- The Death Pearl (1904)
- The One Virtue (1904)
- The Skyscraper in B Flat (1904)
- On the River of Mist (1904)
- “Knowest Thou That Land?” (with Will S. McGann) (1904)
- The Crimson Blight (1905)
- The Last Dawn (1906)
- By the River of Death (1906)
- Finis (1906)
- The Sign of Scorpio (1906)
- The Dominant Chord (1908)
- The Zuni Crystal (1908)
- World-Wreckers (1908)
- The Desire of the Eyes (1909)
- The Honeymoon of the Dragon (1909)
- Prince of Apaches (1909)
- The Crime Capsule (1910)
- Yellow Blood (1910)
- Two on Trinity (1911)
- The Vulture’s Daughter (1911)
- The Treasure Trail (1917)
- The Sea-Snake (1918)
- Poison Key (1919)
- Deep-Sea Dust (1925)
- Incantation (1925)
- The Golden Scent (1929)

== Notes ==
The Locus database spells his name "Pollock". The latest anthology (1999) uses "Pollack" although this appears a departure from original publication information.
