= God of War Sons of Sparta =

2026 video game

- Developers: Mega Cat Studios; Santa Monica Studio
- Publisher: Sony Interactive Entertainment
- Directors: Zack Manko; Nate Flynn
- Producer: Jeff Ketcham
- Designer: Zack Miller
- Programmer: Nathan Wilson
- Artist: Wesley Clavio
- Writers: Matt Sophos; Richard Zangrande Gaubert; Orion Walker
- Composer: Bear McCreary
- Series: God of War
- Platforms: PlayStation 5; PlayStation 4
- Release: PlayStation 5; February 12, 2026; PlayStation 4; November 16, 2026
- Genre: Metroidvania
- Modes: Single-player, multiplayer

God of War Sons of Sparta is a 2026 Metroidvania video game developed by Mega Cat Studios and Santa Monica Studio and published by Sony Interactive Entertainment. It was released worldwide on February 12, 2026, for the PlayStation 5 with a PlayStation 4 version later releasing on November 16, 2026. The 10th installment in the God of War franchise and the first chronologically, it is a prequel to the entire series, set before God of War: Ascension (2013) and the flashback sequences in God of War: Ghost of Sparta (2010). It is the first full game in the series to be loosely based on Greek mythology since Ascension, as the prior two installments—God of War (2018) and God of War Ragnarök (2022)—were based on Norse mythology.

A coming-of-age story themed around duty, honor, and brotherhood, players control series protagonist Kratos, but in his youth during his training at the Agoge with his younger brother Deimos. After learning that one of their comrades has gone missing, the brothers travel throughout Laconia to find their friend, battling Greek mythological foes and a secretive cult that encroach upon Sparta, strengthening their bond. The story is told by an adult Kratos as a lesson to his daughter Calliope during his time as a captain in the Spartan Army, before the character's tragedy as seen through flashbacks in the original God of War (2005).

The game is the second installment in the series to be presented as a two-dimensional (2D) action-platformer, after God of War: Betrayal (2007). It has a similar combination of combat, platforming, and puzzle game elements as other games in the series. Due to its setting taking place long before Kratos received his signature double-chained blades weapon, the Blades of Chaos, the character instead uses a traditional Spartan spear and shield, with additional items that grant special attacks and magical abilities. An offline multiplayer option is also available in a roguelite challenge mode; this is only the second installment in the series to offer multiplayer, after Ascension. The game also sees the return of TC Carson as adult Kratos, the character's original voice actor who last portrayed the role in Ascension; Christopher Judge played Kratos in the Norse-based games. Antony Del Rio also reprises his role as young Kratos from Ghost of Sparta.

Sons of Sparta received mixed reviews from critics. Praise was directed towards the narrative and 2D environments, while criticism focused on the lackluster Metroidvania gameplay design, combat system, and character designs. Some reviewers were disappointed that the main game did not have cooperative play, and criticized the PlayStation Store listing for multiplayer, as players originally had to complete the main game first to access the mode; the developers addressed this with an update enabling the multiplayer to be unlocked sooner. Financially, Sons of Sparta did well during its release month in the United States as it was the 14th best-selling game of February 2026.

== Gameplay ==
Gameplay depicting young Kratos (right) battling a Gorgon, thrusting his spear into the creature. The upper left corner depicts the player's health, spirit, and magic meters, as well as what special weapon is equipped, while the number in the upper right corner is the amount of blood orbs collected.

God of War Sons of Sparta is an action-platformer game with a two-dimensional (2D) art style similar to God of War: Betrayal (2007), the only other installment in the series to be a 2D side-scroller. Unlike Betrayal, however, Sons of Sparta is a Metroidvania game. Players control the character Kratos in his youth as he trains at the Agoge with his brother Deimos. Due to its setting taking place long before Kratos received his signature weapon, the double-chained blades called the Blades of Chaos, the character instead uses a traditional Spartan spear and shield—the Dory and Aspis, respectively—along with Gifts of Olympus that grant him special attacks and magical abilities which are required for game progression due to its Metroidvania style. One of these gifts include the Victory Sandals that grant enhanced speed and jumping. Many familiar foes from prior Greek games appear, such as undead soldiers, harpies, minotaurs, gorgons, cyclopes, wraiths, sirens, and satyrs, as well as new enemies, like lampades, lamias, and fauns, and various boss opponents.

The game retains the crafting system of the prior two installments—God of War (2018) and God of War Ragnarök (2022)—in which the player collects resources that allows them to create new or upgrade existing attachments for both the Dory and Aspis, as well as for gouri attachments (charms) on one armor piece, the Belt of Tyche, providing better perks and enhanced abilities. Like previous games, the player also collects different colored orbs. Green orbs replenish the player's health, blue orbs replenish magic, allowing the use of magical abilities, gold orbs replenish spirit, an attribute that allows the use of special weapon abilities, and red orbs, referred to as blood orbs, act as experience points, which can be used to learn new offensive and defensive techniques for Dory, Aspis, and the Victory Sandals, and are also used in crafting. There are also chests that contain these orbs as well as various crafting resources. Defeating enemies grant random orbs, as does destroying inanimate objects. Namesake olive offerings at the temples of Dionysus, Nike, and Hestia also increase the maximum lengths of the health, spirit, and magic meters, respectively, while those at the temples of Apollo, Artemis, and Demeter help further improve the Dory, Aspis, and Belt of Tyche, respectively (e.g., the respective offensive and defensive stats for the Dory and Aspis, and increased gouri attachments for the Belt of Tyche).

The game offers an offline multiplayer option (couch co-op), which can be played solo as Kratos or cooperatively with another player controlling Deimos. This roguelite challenge mode is called the Pit of Agonies. At the end of each level within the Pit, players are allowed to select an upgrade to a weapon or ability, but these upgrades only last for the duration of that challenge run. Each run-through unlocks further rewards that are permanently unlocked. Death resets the player back to the start of the Pit. At launch, the mode could only be accessed after the player completed the main game, but in a patch update on February 26, 2026, an option to input a cheat code was added that unlocks the multiplayer sooner.

== Synopsis ==
=== Setting ===
After the prior two installments—God of War (2018) and God of War Ragnarök (2022)—were based on Norse mythology, Sons of Sparta returns the God of War series to its original Greek mythology setting of the first seven games. It takes place in an alternate version of ancient Greece, populated by the Olympian gods, Titans, and other mythological beings. The game follows two time periods of series protagonist Kratos: the narrative present, which takes place sometime before God of War: Ascension (2013) when he is still a captain in the Spartan Army before the tragedy that is seen through flashbacks in the original God of War (2005), and the past, where the majority of the story is set and follows a teenage Kratos with his younger brother Deimos—taking place sometime before the latter's abduction and imprisonment by the God of War Ares as seen through flashbacks in God of War: Ghost of Sparta (2010).

Throughout the game, Kratos and Deimos explore various parts of Laconia in search of a lost friend. The region's capital is Sparta, the home of Kratos and Deimos, which acts as a central hub. Outside of Sparta, the brothers traverse the Laconian Woods where they meet a pair of thieving Kerkopes, the Oenus Vineyard, an abandoned winery where the brothers fight a daemon called Alastor, Mount Taygetos, a mountain range in the Peloponnese peninsula that overlooks Sparta, the Barren Steppe, the location of an unauthorized habitation of a secretive cult, the Veiled Bog, where Spartans train for endurance against mythical threats, and the Isle of Aeaea, the home of the witch Circe. Other locations include the Eurotas River, the Port of Messenia, the Shores of Elafonisos, Kythira Island, and Vyros Gorge.

=== Characters ===
The protagonist of the game is Kratos. The present day adult Kratos (voiced by TC Carson) is a captain of the Spartan Army who has an 8-year-old daughter named Calliope (Debi Derryberry). The young 13-year-old Kratos (Antony Del Rio) is a Spartan still in training at the Agoge with his 11-year-old brother Deimos (Scott Menville), who is adamant on finding their lost friend Vasilis, an unseen character who the game's plot is based around.

The brothers are under the tutelage of Konstantinos (James Mathis III), the headmaster of the Agoge and a sculptor. His daughter is Amara (Shelby Young), an Amazon and the only girl in the Agoge; she cares deeply for her friends and is the one to push the brothers to search for Vasilis. Other characters at the Agoge include Brontes (David Errigo Jr.), Kratos's old rival who cares about Sparta's strength and prosperity above all else while opposing Kratos's care for his brother, and Eis (Jack Quaid), a compassionate Spartan comrade who was the closest to Vasilis.

Other characters include Adrasteia (Misty Lee), previously a nymph who was turned into a griffin as punishment by the Titan Cronos for looking after an infant Zeus and provides fast travel across Laconia for the brothers; Passalus and Acmon (Adam Shapiro and Allen Covert, respectively), the pair of Kerkopes who exchange goods with the brothers; Circe (Zehra Fazal), a powerful witch who provides gear upgrades for Kratos in exchange for helping her find her cats scattered across Laconia as she is bound to Aeaea; Eleonora (Amelia Rose Blaire), a temple maiden entrusted to care for the temples of the gods across Laconia which grant Kratos enhancements to his abilities in exchange for olive offerings; The Oracle of Trophonius at Lebadeia (Kimberly Brooks), who provides Kratos and Deimos information about their quests; Brasidas (Jim Pirri), a Spartan City Guard posted at the western gate who does not believe the exploits of Kratos and Deimos to be true; Tiberios (Chris Ansell), a Spartan blacksmith who makes new gear for Kratos; Petros (A.J. LoCascio), a Krypteia who offers Kratos combat advice; and The Devoted One (Bridger Zadina), the leader of the secretive cult and a minor antagonist.

=== Plot ===
While in between deployments, adult Kratos finds his daughter Calliope to scold her for disobeying her mother Lysandra and neglecting her duty. When Calliope begins to argue, Kratos decides to relay a story from his youth to teach her the meaning of duty.

While just outside of Sparta, a young Kratos battles a Cyclops. When he gets in trouble, he is rescued by his brother Deimos. Together, they return home to report of the dangers outside the city. The brothers are currently in possession of an Eiren's Pass, granting them permission to venture throughout Laconia. Kratos is also working on qualifying for the Vanguard Circle, the highest rank for a cadet that allows them to lead their own unit. While heading out for another assignment from Konstantinos, they find out that one of their classmates, Vasilis, went missing, and none of the authorities are doing anything about it. Deimos promises to help however he can, but Kratos is more dismissive of the matter.

During their mission, they come across traces of Vasilis, and after their return, Deimos confides in his doubts to Konstantinos about how Sparta abandoned their classmates seemingly against its own values. The headmaster agrees that the boy is right to question, but urged the two not to neglect their chores.

Getting their friends to cover for them, Deimos doubles down on the search effort. Kratos argues that Vasilis was a weak link, and that Sparta may have been better off without him, but his brother plays on his sympathy, calling him to imagine if it was Deimos who was lost. They come across many dangers, such as monsters overrunning a winery and a cult occupying a granary, as well as various boss opponents including the malevolent ancient entity Fylaki, the sea creature Skolopendra, and three Stymphalian Birds named Ioke, Ponea, and Apate. Continued effort puts a strain on the brother's relationship, but they manage to reconcile. As the two trace Vasilis's steps, they learn he was still trying to find ways to make himself useful to Sparta. Kratos feels great guilt as he comes to realize he was one of the people that pushed Vasilis away, rather than help him find his place, and he continues the search even against orders from Konstantinos.

After engaging with the cult and battling a powerful Ipotane, the two brothers manage to find Vasilis—he was killed by a chimaeric monster called Koteros, which they subsequently slay in return. They note he managed to shoot an arrow into the monster's eye, honoring him in death as a true Spartan warrior, and they bring him back to the city. Kratos takes the blame, both for disobedience, claiming he was the one to push for the search, and for letting Vasilis die by neglecting him, calling to be beat as punishment. Touched by the boy's resolve, Konstantinos waives the punishment, claiming beatings would not be necessary, but denies Kratos the chance to join the Vanguard Circle that year.

Back in the present, Kratos questions if Calliope understood why he told her the story. During the time, he also crafted her a wooden flute (Note: The same flute that Kratos sees Calliope playing in the Underworld in God of War: Chains of Olympus (2008). Prior to briefly reuniting with her in the Fields of Elysium towards the end of that game, he was haunted by a flute melody which he eventually realized was her, and he also briefly heard it while in the Underworld in God of War III (2010). He also found a materialized version of the flute while traveling in Valhalla in God of War Ragnarök: Valhalla (2023).) and he reveals that his friend's name "Eis" was short for Atreus. (Note: The Spartan comrade who Kratos names his son after in the Norse-based games.)

== Development ==
In March 2025, Giant Bomb's Jeff Grubb claimed that a "side-story" in the God of War franchise was in development and would return the series to its original Greek mythology setting. He also said it would be released in 2025, later stating it was delayed to 2026. Around the same time, Tom Henderson of Insider Gaming said it would be a 2D Metroidvania game. Neither Sony nor God of War's main developer, Santa Monica Studio, made any statements on a new entry until February 2026. During the company's State of Play presentation on February 12, Sony officially announced God of War Sons of Sparta and released it simultaneously that same day for the PlayStation 5 as part of the franchise's 20th-anniversary year. It was developed by Mega Cat Studios in collaboration with Santa Monica Studio.

Sons of Sparta came about from an email that Mega Cat Studios sent Santa Monica Studio. According to game director Zack Manko, Mega Cat had always wanted to develop a God of War game, with the studio's chief executive officer James Deighan and executive producer Daniel Pesante both stating it had been at the top of their wishlist. After seeing the Raising Kratos (2019) documentary that Santa Monica had done for 2018's God of War and relating to an idea that never came to fruition, Pesante decided to take a leap of faith and email Santa Monica about their idea for a God of War game. Due to their specialty in retro games, one of their initial thoughts was what would God of War be like if it had come out on the PlayStation 1. Santa Monica's lead producer Jeff Ketcham said that Mega Cat had a love and passion for the series and turning God of War into pixel was unique. After he presented Mega Cat's idea to the rest of the Santa Monica team, the project was approved and they began conversating.

=== Combat and level design ===
Ketcham said it took a lot of work and planning to transition God of War from 3D to 2D, and praised Mega Cat Studios for having those plans laid out from the beginning. Pixel artist Anna Nguyen said that one of the considerations that they had to make was transitioning the 3D combat to 2D and making it flow smoothly, since it would be limited to the 2D plane. She said that some of the animations were taken directly from the older games. Mega Cat developed a tool that took those animations and converted them to 2D spreadsheets, after which, the pixel artists drew over them to create the animations.

Combat designer Tyler Bryan said they tried to keep to the core of the God of War series, so they had the game start with a boss battle against a cyclops and ripping its eye out, two characteristics of the older Greek games. In addition to bringing back familiar enemies, they also brought in newer ones but tried to keep the feel of the Greek games. Art assistant TJ Tague noted how the franchise was known for its large boss battles and they decided to use lesser known monsters and creatures from Greek mythology to create the boss battles for Sons of Sparta. He also said one of the most important things for them was to make sure that Kratos felt fun to play. Manko said that Kratos's base kit was all about his Spartan training and how he used his spear and shield in combat.

In designing the game's levels, Mega Cat worked with Santa Monica to ensure the levels fit not only this game but also the Greek setting, as well as the God of War universe. This was to ensure that the levels felt authentic to both Laconia and the series. Level designer Kevin Altman said their approach was to treat each level like individual characters, going beyond visuals and looking at the color palette and shape language. To fill out the environments, Nguyen said they compared the in-game locations to the real world locations in Greece, and translated things such as plant life into the 2D environment so that each level was unique. One of the inspirations in designing the levels of Sons of Sparta was Pandora's Temple from the original God of War (2005) due to its many side rooms and puzzles.

=== Writing and voice work ===
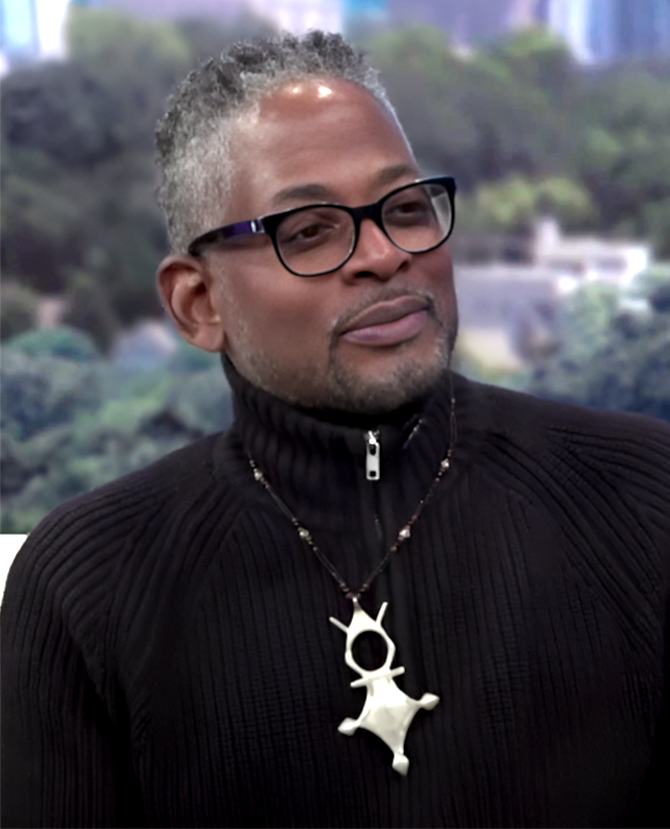
TC Carson, the original voice actor for the adult Kratos, reprised the role for the first time since God of War: Ascension in 2013.

Sons of Sparta is the first full game to return to the franchise's Greek setting after the two prior entries, 2018's God of War and its 2022 sequel Ragnarök, were based on Norse mythology and set in ancient Scandinavia, although the latter's 2023 expansion pack, Valhalla, saw Kratos confronting parts of his past life, revisiting some areas and facing enemies from his time in Greece. The game was written by Matt Sophos and Richard Zangrande Gaubert, the same team behind the Norse games.

According to Gaubert in deciding when to have the story take place, it was important for them to pick a pivotal point in Kratos's life and one that players had not seen before, and it also allowed them to explore some things from Greek mythology that they had not done in the prior Greek games. He noted that while the Kratos in this game was different from the adult versions in the prior Greek and Norse games, players would be able to see elements of those versions in this younger Kratos. Sophos said that despite the game's retro style, it did not stop them from bringing emotion to the story and they used the same mentality that they applied in writing the prior games.

TC Carson reprises his role as the adult Kratos for the first time since Ascension, acting as the narrator. In returning to the role, Carson said it was an opportunity to go back and create who the character was before Kratos's tragedy. Gaubert said they factored in Carson's prior portrayal but because of the setting of this game's story, they were able to show a different side to the character, that of being a family man in between wars. Manko noted that since the game takes place before Kratos came to despise the Olympian gods, this younger version was more devout towards them. Antony Del Rio, reprising his role as young Kratos from Ghost of Sparta, noted how Kratos believes he is right in his ways, but throughout the game, he comes to question his decisions.

Manko noted how players would see Kratos's brother Deimos and their relationship, and said it was a coming-of-age story where the brothers learn about themselves as well as what it means to be Spartans. Scott Menville portrays Deimos and according to him, Kratos is more strict to the Spartan rules while Deimos is a bit more rebellious. Sophos said that because of that, Deimos allows the game to hit more at its emotional core and he pushes Kratos out of his comfort zone. Debi Derryberry also reprises her role as Kratos's daughter Calliope, previously voicing her in God of War: Chains of Olympus (2008) and God of War III (2010), while Keith Ferguson, who had voiced the Boat Captain in the original God of War (2005) and God of War II (2007), reprises the minor humorous role, but when the character was still a deckhand, credited as The Deckhand. (Note: The Boat Captain is a running gag throughout the God of War series, either appearing or being referenced in almost every game.) Two other series veterans also return, but voicing different characters. Bridger Zadina, who had voiced young Deimos in Ghost of Sparta, voices the cult leader antagonist known as The Devoted One, while A.J. LoCascio, who had voiced the character Skjöldr in Ragnarök, voices the Krypteia Petros.

=== Music ===
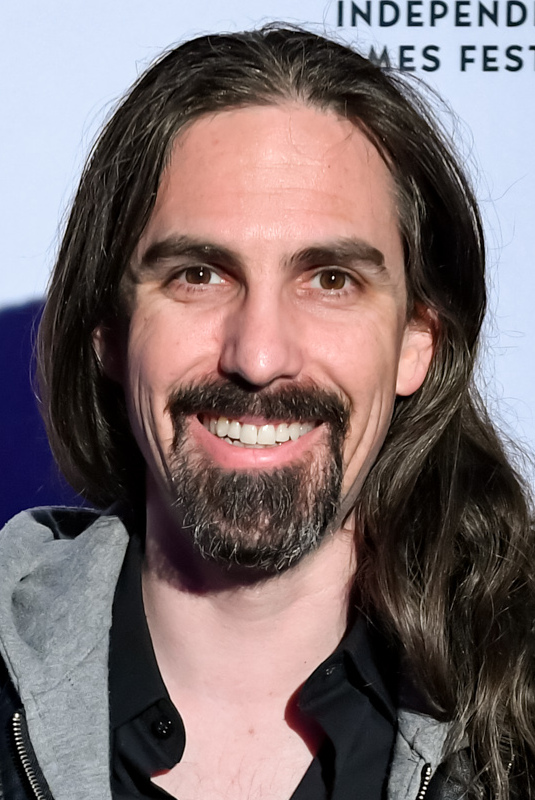
Bear McCreary returned to compose the music, after scoring the prior two installments, God of War (2018) and God of War Ragnarök (2022).

Bear McCreary, who composed the music for the two Norse games, returned to score Sons of Sparta. When McCreary heard about a retro style God of War, he contacted Santa Monica Studio, interested in returning. He was also glad to hear that Mega Cat Studios were behind it, feeling they brought authenticity to their games. Manko said they were thrilled to have McCreary scoring the game, as McCreary grew up with these types of games and was familiar with the soundtracks and chiptunes of the retro style game music, as McCreary had also experimented with these sounds in his early days. McCreary said that he had always been interested to score a game in this style as they were what he grew up on, and Sons of Sparta was an opportunity to write a love letter on that as well as the music from his youth.

According to McCreary, the game combines three major elements: God of War's Greek era, retro gaming aesthetics, and an epic emotional story. McCreary created three different sonic pallets for those elements and mixed and matched them together. For the Greek element, McCreary drew from Greek folk music, using instruments such as the kithara and aulos, stringed and woodwind instruments that were around during ancient Greek times. For the retro aspect, he used various samples and synthesis to create the retro style of chiptunes. For the emotional story, he used a full symphony and choir as he did on the Norse games. Manko noted the uniqueness of the score in how it blended the modern orchestral and choir sounds with the chiptunes, with McCreary stating his biggest challenge was balancing these sounds.

Instead of writing separate themes for Kratos and Deimos, McCreary only wrote one theme for the both of them. He said although they are two separate characters, the game is about their relationship together. He wanted to have only one theme that evolved as their relationship changed throughout the game. His idea was to have a theme that represented them as children, claiming it would not have made sense to quote anything that he wrote for the Norse games or anything from the prior Greek games as those were different stories. He said the main themes of the game were duty, honor, and brotherhood, so he came up with a "beautiful, mournful" tune, which he said has nostalgia and was what he thinks that older Kratos would think of about his youth.

Relating to the games that McCreary played in his own youth, he said those games would have a different theme for every area, and that was fun for him when scoring Sons of Sparta, instead of just having one theme that played throughout the entire game. Senior music designer Sonia Coronado of PlayStation Studios Music said that one of the things that surprised her in working with the music was that removing one element would change the score to some extent, and that was a challenge in implementing it into the game. She also said it was tricky to find areas of when to transition in and out of the music, as they did not want to just have it fade in or fade out.

== Release ==
Sons of Sparta was shadow dropped during a State of Play presentation on February 12, 2026, for the PlayStation 5. It is only available digitally in both a standard and deluxe edition. The Digital Deluxe Edition includes in-game rewards (gear and upgrade materials), as well as a digital art book, the game's soundtrack, and PlayStation Network avatars. The game was later released for the PlayStation 4 on November 16, 2026. Along with this release was a free update for both versions that include two new modes for the game, a Hermes Mode and Erebus Mode, named after the respective Greek gods. The Hermes Mode, which can be accessed by inputting a cheat code, is a speedrun mode for players to complete the game as quickly as possible, while the Erebus Mode is a challenge mode for any difficulty where Kratos and all foes die in a single hit, excluding bosses but they take significant damage from Kratos.

According to sales data for the United States compiled by Circana, which is based on revenue and not units sold, Sons of Sparta was the 14th best-selling game of February 2026 on the multi-platform chart, and sixth on the PlayStation-specific chart. Due to Sons of Sparta's cheaper price (US$29.99 for standard edition and $39.99 for deluxe edition), that means it had to sell twice as many units to outperform full priced games ($69.99), such as Ghost of Yōtei, Forza Horizon 5, and Marvel's Spider-Man 2 (which were 15th, 16th, and 18th, respectively, on the multi-platform sales chart).

== Reception ==
Reception

Aggregate scores
Aggregator	Score
Metacritic	64/100
OpenCritic	29% recommend

Review scores
Publication	Score
Game Informer	6.5/10
Gamekult	6/10
GamesRadar+	3/5
Hardcore Gamer	3.5/5
HobbyConsolas	70/100
IGN	6/10
Push Square	7/10
CGMagazine	7.5/10
Eurogamer.de	3/5
Gameliner	3.5/5
IGN Benelux	8/10
IGN France	7/10
IGN Italy	6/10
IGN Spain	7/10

According to the review aggregator website Metacritic, Sons of Sparta received "mixed or average" reviews, with a score of 64 out of 100 based on 79 reviews. The game has a 29% approval rating on OpenCritic based on 86 reviews.

Much of the criticism was aimed at it being a Metroidvania game. Kyle Hilliard of Game Informer said that every aspect of a Metroidvania game was present but only at a base level or lower. IGN's Jarrett Green claimed that it failed to meet the same standard as other games in the genre. Writing for GamesRadar+, Oscar Taylor-Kent said that it felt unsatisfying. Eurogamer's Martin Woger was more positive, stating that the exploration was "genuinely fun", although not necessarily more than other Metroidvanias, but not less. He said it delivered "solid genre work", but in comparison to other Metroidvanias, it was not "outstanding" and fell short.

Speaking of the combat, Green said that it was the "most reliably compelling thing going on", but Kratos's offensive options do not resemble anything from prior games. He also said that while there were many customization options for the various abilities, there was no real incentive to do so. Hilliard said that movement was stiff, the combat was underwhelming, the alternative weapon upgrades were "fine", and fast travel was unwieldy, as although a better version is unlocked later, it comes "way too late". Taylor-Kent said that the combat was "floaty and slow", and that the player and enemy animations were "clunky and ugly", but said that in some ways, it made sense due to the characters' ages. Having a similar opinion as Green, Taylor-Kent said that the unlockable gear was lackluster, and they mostly kept their early gear equipped and just upgraded it.

The narrative was more well received. Green said that although they never had a want to see Kratos in his teenage years, it was a "pleasant character rehabilitation of a largely unlikable guy", but said the story was largely boring. Despite Hilliard saying the narrative was not important in the overall scheme of the series, the narrative and characterization were the game's strongest points. While the stakes were low, Hilliard said that "I was moved by the ending and learning how Kratos' Spartan upbringing made him the god he eventually becomes", but getting to those story moments through the gameplay was "far less compelling". Taylor-Kent said that the narrative was not a bad premise, but it often felt "like an extensive anti-bullying PSA". Woger claimed that the lore that Sons of Sparta adds to the series makes this a worthwhile game for fans, although said that the game's actual plot "happens more or less in the background".

In regards to the game's design, Hilliard said that although they loved the 2D style and the visuals of the background and characters in this style, it overall felt "cheap" and that it did not have the same level of production value that is expected for a God of War game. Green opined that while the levels looked good, there was nothing special or memorable about them. Woger said the overall design direction was strange and did not evoke God of War, but said the pixel art was "okay". He said that while it was "pretty enough to look at", it did not quite compare to other installments in the series or other Metroidvanias. Taylor-Kent claimed that despite the detailed backgrounds, they "often miss the awe inspiring vistas", comparing it to similar games like Blasphemous, Hollow Knight: Silksong, and Death's Gambit. He was also critical of the character and enemy models in this 2D style, calling them "ugly".

Reviewers had little to say about the Pit of Agonies multiplayer mode itself. Their attention was instead drawn to the game's PlayStation Store listing at launch, calling it misleading, as although true, players had to complete the main game first before they could access the multiplayer (which was not clarified by the listing or in-game). Woger did state that it would have been "cool and innovative" if the main game had co-op, which he claimed was something it "desperately needed". David Rodríguez of HobbyConsolas was also disappointed by the lack of co-op for the main game. The developers addressed the "misleading" criticism through a patch update, allowing players to enter a cheat code to unlock the multiplayer mode sooner.

David Jaffe, the creator of the God of War franchise who left Santa Monica Studio after God of War II's release in 2007, derided the game for "its inability to reflect the license", calling it "generic" and "not God of War". He described the portrayal of Kratos as "some generic boring little fucking kid", though stated that the gameplay was "serviceable" and that he was not opposed to a 2.5D game in the series, naming Ninja Gaiden: Ragebound, Neon Inferno, and Shinobi: Art of Vengeance as examples. He also criticized the game's user interface, visual design, dialogue, and voice acting.
