= God of War: Ascension =

2013 video game

- North American box art
- Developer: Santa Monica Studio
- Publisher: Sony Computer Entertainment
- Director: Todd Papy
- Producer: Whitney Wade
- Designer: Mark Simon
- Programmer: Vassily A. Filippov
- Artist: Christopher Sutton
- Writer: Marianne Krawczyk
- Composer: Tyler Bates
- Series: God of War
- Platform: PlayStation 3
- Release: NA: March 12, 2013; EU: March 13, 2013; AU: March 14, 2013; UK: March 15, 2013
- Genres: Action-adventure, hack and slash
- Modes: Single-player, multiplayer

God of War: Ascension is a 2013 action-adventure game developed by Santa Monica Studio and published by Sony Computer Entertainment for the PlayStation 3. Released in March 2013, it is the seventh installment in the God of War series and the second chronologically. Loosely based on Greek mythology, it is set in ancient Greece with vengeance as its central motif. The player controls the protagonist, Kratos, the former servant of the God of War Ares, who tricked Kratos into killing his own wife and daughter. In response to this tragedy, Kratos renounced Ares, breaking his blood oath to the god. Kratos was, therefore, imprisoned and tortured by the three Furies, guardians of honor and enforcers of punishment. Helped by the oath keeper, Orkos, Kratos escapes his imprisonment and confronts the Furies, aiming to free himself of his bond to Ares.

The gameplay is similar to previous installments, focusing on combo-based combat with the player's main weapon, the Blades of Chaos, and other weapons acquired by the game's World Weapons mechanic. It continues the use of quick time events from previous entries but also utilizes a promptless free-form system. Four magical attacks and a power-enhancing ability can be used as alternative combat options, and the game features puzzles and platforming elements. The game also features a redesigned combat system, gameplay mechanics not available in previous installments, and downloadable content. Notably, Ascension was the first installment in the series to include multiplayer, which is online-only and features modes for both competitive and cooperative play. From October 2012 to March 2013, a social experience was available online in the form of a graphic novel titled Rise of the Warrior, a prequel story that tied into the game's single-player and multiplayer modes. Ascension was the last game in the series to be based on Greek mythology until the 2026 title, Sons of Sparta; the franchise shifted to Norse mythology with 2018's God of War and its 2022 sequel Ragnarök, with Christopher Judge replacing Terrence C. Carson as the voice of Kratos.

God of War: Ascension received generally positive reviews from critics, who praised its fundamental gameplay and spectacle as true to the series, although the story was deemed to be less compelling than in previous installments. The game's multiplayer element received mixed responses: although reviewers found that the gameplay translated well into the multiplayer setting, they criticized the balance and depth of combat. Ascension sold less than its predecessor, with over 3 million units shipped and received no awards, but it did, however, receive several nominations, including "Outstanding Achievement in Videogame Writing" at the Writers Guild of America Videogame Awards and the Academy of Interactive Arts & Sciences award for "Outstanding Achievement in Sound Design".

== Gameplay ==
In both of God of War: Ascension's single-player and multiplayer elements, it is primarily a third-person video game viewed from a fixed camera perspective. Some scenes in the single-player campaign feature a first-person camera view. In single-player mode, the player controls the character Kratos in combo-based combat, platforming, and puzzle games. The enemies are an assortment of creatures, most of whom are drawn from Greek mythology, including cyclopes, cerberuses, empusas, Sirens, Gorgons, satyrs, harpies, and centaurs. Other monsters were created specifically for the game, such as the juggernauts, wraiths, and manticores. Many of the monsters also appear in the multiplayer mode. Platforming elements require the player to climb walls and ladders, jump across chasms, and slide down walls to proceed through sections of the game. The game features a variety of puzzles, ranging from simple to complex.

=== Combat ===
Kratos' main weapons are the Blades of Chaos, a pair of short swords attached to chains that are wrapped around his wrists and forearms. In gameplay, the blades can be swung offensively in various maneuvers. Introduced in Ascension is a weapons mechanic called the World Weapon system and it allows Kratos to pick up weapons scattered throughout game locations or to take them from defeated foes, and to use these for a limited time. There are five World Weapons (sword, club, javelin, sling, shield) that can be collected randomly, although Kratos may possess only one at any time. When a World Weapon is not equipped, Kratos may punch or kick foes as part of the reworked combat system. Another mechanic introduced is that Kratos can tether enemies, referred to as grappling; he can hold an enemy in place with one blade while he attacks other enemies with the other blade, and he can throw the tethered enemy.

Four magical disciplines are acquired, including the Fire of Ares, the Ice of Poseidon, the Lightning of Zeus, and the Soul of Hades, which, depending on the magic equipped, imbues the Blades of Chaos with that elemental property. For example, the Soul of Hades imbues the Blades with purple flames and can unleash souls of the Underworld to briefly attack enemies. The Ice of Poseidon also enables Kratos to breathe underwater, a necessary ability as substantial time is spent there. The Rage ability called Rage of the Gods that was featured in previous games is included, but in this game, its meter is filled by landing attacks on enemies and the ability is automatically activated once the meter has reached maximum capacity. It remains activated until Kratos is attacked or stops attacking for an extended period of time, after which, the meter must be refilled. The Rage ability is also affected by the magic equipped, allowing Kratos to use different Rage attacks, such as the lightning-based Rage of Zeus.

Three relics, the Amulet of Uroborus (Life Cycle mechanic), the Oath Stone of Orkos, and the Eyes of Truth, are acquired and needed for game progression. The Amulet of Uroborus allows Kratos to manipulate time by decaying or healing an object; examples include reconstructing broken pathways and using it during puzzle-solving. Construction can be paused or reversed if needed. The amulet can also be used against enemies to briefly slow their movements. The Oath Stone of Orkos gives Kratos the ability to create a "shadow" duplicate of himself that can depress plates, hold levers, or attack enemies. The Eyes of Truth remove illusions created by the Furies and cast a blinding light on enemies. As well as the quick time event (QTE) mechanic featured in the previous games, Ascension added a promptless free-form system that allows players to choose when to attack or dodge based on the enemy's actions. When certain foes, such as a cyclops or a juggernaut, have been sufficiently weakened, the player may jump on their back and briefly force them to attack other foes.

Other extra features include ten artifacts hidden in the game world that provide more abilities during New Game Plus, such as unlimited magic. This mode also allows players to change Kratos' costume, but trophies are disabled. A feature absent from previous installments but added in Ascension is "Chapter Select", which allows players to select and replay previously completed levels. Unlike previous installments, in which behind-the-scenes videos are unlocked after completing the game, these videos are already available from the main menu.

=== Multiplayer ===
A portion of the Desert of Lost Souls multiplayer map: players (seen on right) battle each other with the Titan cyclops Polyphemus in the background. If players get close to Polyphemus, he will attack them.

God of War: Ascension is the first installment in the series to offer a multiplayer feature, which is online-only, and up to eight players can take part. Before entering multiplayer battles, each player is introduced to a warrior, who, like Kratos, is an oath-breaker and is imprisoned in the Prison of the Damned—the warrior's backstory is explored in Rise of the Warrior. The player takes control of the warrior and aligns with one of the four deities: Ares, Hades, Zeus, or Poseidon. The main objective for players is to take control of a map to earn rewards from the gods. Each god offers a unique combat play-style and in-battle abilities. The attack style of the god with whom the player aligns is critical to their warrior's path. Players who ally with Ares are brute force experts with an up-close focus. Players who ally with Zeus are magical experts with a focus on space control. Players who ally with Poseidon are supports with a focus on team synergy and self-sustenance. Players who ally with Hades are versatile, unlike the other three, featuring other unique mechanics such as lifesteal, stealth, and curses. Players can create a total of four warriors to have a champion representing each god.

Players can unlock special magic abilities, new and upgraded armor, weapons, relics, and other treasures as they earn experience points (XP) to level-up their warrior. Players may also complete "Labors", which are challenges from the gods that rewards armor and weapons. Throughout multiplayer matches, players receive buffs and debuffs, and there is a color-coding system, called flashes, where a player's character will flash a certain color indicating a special property, such as vulnerability or invulnerability. A prestige feature called "Ascension", added in the June 10, 2013 update, allows players to reset their allegiance progression when they reach Level 40, and receive in-game currency for "Godly" armor and weapons—the "most valuable and powerful items in the game". They are classified as a Hero the first time they ascend and then a Demigod the second time and keep that title from then on.

There are five multiplayer modes: Team Favor of the Gods, Match of Champions, Trial of the Gods, Capture the Flag, and Bout of Honor. Team matches randomly assign players to compete on either the Spartan or Trojan team. The "signature" multiplayer mode is Team Favor of the Gods, in which two teams of two-to-four players try to win by accumulating a target quantity of points. Points, known as Favor, are earned by killing and other methods. When players are not on the offensive, they may help their team earn points by capturing altars, collecting red orbs from chests, and setting traps for opposing players. The non-team version, Match of Champions, is a four-to-eight-player deathmatch with a similar goal to Team Favor of the Gods. Trial of the Gods is a two-player, cooperative (co-op), time-trial mode in which the duo faces five waves of mythological monsters concluding with a boss fight. A single-player version is also available. In Capture the Flag, two teams of four players battle to capture the opposing team's flag and return it to their base until a target number of flags have been obtained. In Bout of Honor, added in the July 11, 2013 update, players test their skills in a best-of-seven-rounds one-on-one fight.

All but two of the fifteen multiplayer maps are based on locations explored throughout the God of War series, with eight of those based on locations explored in Ascension; for example, Desert of Lost Souls is from the original God of War, Bog of the Forgotten is from God of War II, and Labyrinth of Daedalus, Forum of Hercules, and Chamber of the Flame are from God of War III. The two original maps are the Coliseum of Persia and the Walls of Troy (which features the Trojan Horse). Every map features special power-ups awarded by the gods for earning points, such as the Boots of Hermes for acceleration and running attacks. Maps also have environmental obstacles or objectives to complete for more points. For example, on the Desert of Lost Souls map, the cyclops Polyphemus may attack nearby players and killing him with the Spear of Olympus will grant bonus points for that team.

== Synopsis ==
=== Setting ===
As with previous games, God of War: Ascension is set in an alternate version of ancient Greece populated by the Olympian gods, Titans, and other beings from Greek mythology. Game events are set sometime between Sons of Sparta (2026) and Chains of Olympus (2008), taking place six months after Kratos killed his family—10 years before the original God of War (2005). The game's narrative takes place over four weeks; it shifts between the present (the fourth week) and past (the preceding three weeks), while the player controls Kratos in both. Several locations, including the Prison of the Damned and some real-world locations—including the village Kirra, the city Delphi, and the island Delos—are explored in the game.

The Prison of the Damned is the Furies' massive prison to house all oath-breakers. Kirra is an abandoned village that lost its water supply after its water wheel and aqueduct were destroyed. Other than monsters, the only life is in its harbor, where the tamed Harbor Master guides vessels in and out of the port. Delphi is located in the snowy mountains north of Kirra and features the Tower of Delphi. After activating three massive, mechanical pythons, the Tower allows access to the Temple of Delphi, home of the Oracle. Delos features a Titan-sized statue of Apollo, constructed by the inventor Archimedes to honor the god.

=== Characters ===
The game's protagonist is Kratos (voiced by Terrence C. Carson), a Spartan warrior who broke his blood oath to the god Ares after being tricked into killing his family by his former master. The main antagonists are the three Furies: Megaera (Nika Futterman), Tisiphone (Debi Mae West), and the Fury Queen, Alecto (Jennifer Hale). The Furies are the guardians of honor and the bane of traitors, who punish those they deem guilty. They were spawned from the eons-long war between the Primordials, the beings who created the Earth. Other characters include the oath keeper Orkos (Troy Baker), the son of Ares and Alecto, who was disowned by the god as he was not the perfect warrior that Ares sought; Aletheia (Adrienne Barbeau), the Oracle of Delphi with prophetic sight; the corrupted Prophet Castor (David W. Collins) and his conjoined twin Pollux (Brad Grusnick), who usurped the oracle, deciding who can consult her; and the Scribe of Hecatonchires (Robin Atkin Downes), the first mortal imprisoned by the Furies who has been keeping records to maintain his sanity. Kratos' wife Lysandra (Jennifer Hale) and his daughter Calliope appear in an illusion created by Alecto, and the King of Sparta (Crispin Freeman) and the Village Oracle (Susan Blakeslee) appear in an illusion created by Tisiphone with the help of her familiar, Daemon.

In the game's multiplayer mode, Zeus (Corey Burton), the King of the Olympian Gods, Ares (Steven Blum), the God of War, Poseidon (Gideon Emery), the God of the Sea, and Hades (Fred Tatasciore), the God of the Underworld, appear as statues at the Rotunda of Olympus where the player selects one to align to, after which the chosen god will communicate with the player during gameplay. Castor and Pollux, the demigod Hercules, the Titan cyclops Polyphemus, the Gorgon Stheno, and the giant scorpion Skorpius also appear in the multiplayer as bosses and/or environmental obstacles.

=== Plot ===
After breaking his blood oath to Ares, Kratos is still haunted by visions of his brutal past. Confronted by Orkos in the Village of Kirra, Kratos is advised that the visions he has been experiencing are mind tricks created by the Furies, and instructs him to find the Oracle of Delphi. Upon arrival at the Temple of Delphi, he overcomes Castor and Pollux, who tried to kill the Oracle. In her dying breath, the Oracle instructs Kratos to travel to Delos to retrieve the Eyes of Truth. Taking the Amulet of Uroborus from the now-dead Castor and Pollux, Kratos travels to Kirra's harbor, where he again encounters Orkos. The oath keeper reveals that Ares wanted a perfect warrior to help him overthrow Zeus, so Ares helped Kratos against the barbarians to make him into a perfect warrior. (Note: As depicted in the prologue of the 2005 game) Orkos became the oath keeper and did not question the Furies until Ares tricked Kratos into killing his own family. Armed with this knowledge, Kratos takes a ship to Delos.

A week later, Kratos arrives at the island of Delos and explores the ruined statue of Apollo. He is attacked by all three Furies and is eventually captured. Orkos appears and frees Kratos, transporting him to another location. Orkos gives Kratos his Oath Stone and reveals that he and Aletheia tried to warn Zeus of Ares' and the Furies' plan. In retaliation, they took the Oracle's eyes, the objects Kratos seeks. After a perilous journey, Kratos uses the Amulet of Uroborus to restore the statue and retrieve the eyes. On completing the Trials of Archimedes, Kratos is ambushed and captured by the Furies, who confiscate all his items.

Kratos is imprisoned, chained, and tormented by the Furies for three weeks. The Fury Megaera tortures Kratos, but he manages to break free. Chasing her through the prison, he discovers that the prison itself is Aegaeon the Hecatonchires, the first traitor of the Furies who had broken a blood oath to Zeus; he was turned into the Prison of the Damned as punishment. Overcoming an illusion created by the Fury Tisiphone and her familiar Daemon, Kratos finds and kills Megaera, retrieving the Amulet of Uroborus, which the Furies had confiscated from him when he was imprisoned.

Kratos battles the manticore at the Tower of Delphi. The screenshot demonstrates the new tethering mechanic; it is being used in conjunction with the QTE mechanic.

Tisiphone and Daemon cast another illusion to deceive Kratos, who overcomes it and retrieves the Oath Stone of Orkos. He encounters the Scribe of Hecatonchires, who reveals that the Furies were originally fair in their punishment, but devolved into ruthless beings because of Ares. Continuing his pursuit of the Furies, Kratos reaches the door to Alecto's Chamber, but seemingly returns home to his wife and daughter: another illusion, this time cast by the Fury Queen Alecto. She tries to convince Kratos he can live within this illusion if he rejoins Ares, but he refuses. Enraged, Alecto and Tisiphone attack Kratos, who retrieves the eyes, and Alecto transforms into a Charybdis. After a brutal battle, Kratos uses the eyes to break through the Furies' illusions before killing them both, which destroys the prison.

Kratos returns to Sparta, where he is met by Orkos. He praises Kratos' victory over the Furies, but reveals that Kratos will not be free from Ares' bond unless he kills Orkos, whom the Furies made Kratos' oath keeper again before Kratos killed them. He begs Kratos to give him an honorable death, which will free them both from Ares. Kratos initially refuses out of regret for killing so many innocents, but Orkos' continuing pleas ultimately force Kratos to kill him. Afterward, Kratos experiences the first of many nightmares—previously masked by his bond—and discovers his path to redemption through continual service to Olympus. Kratos burns down his house with the corpse of Orkos inside and leaves, beginning his path towards becoming the champion of the gods.

== Development ==
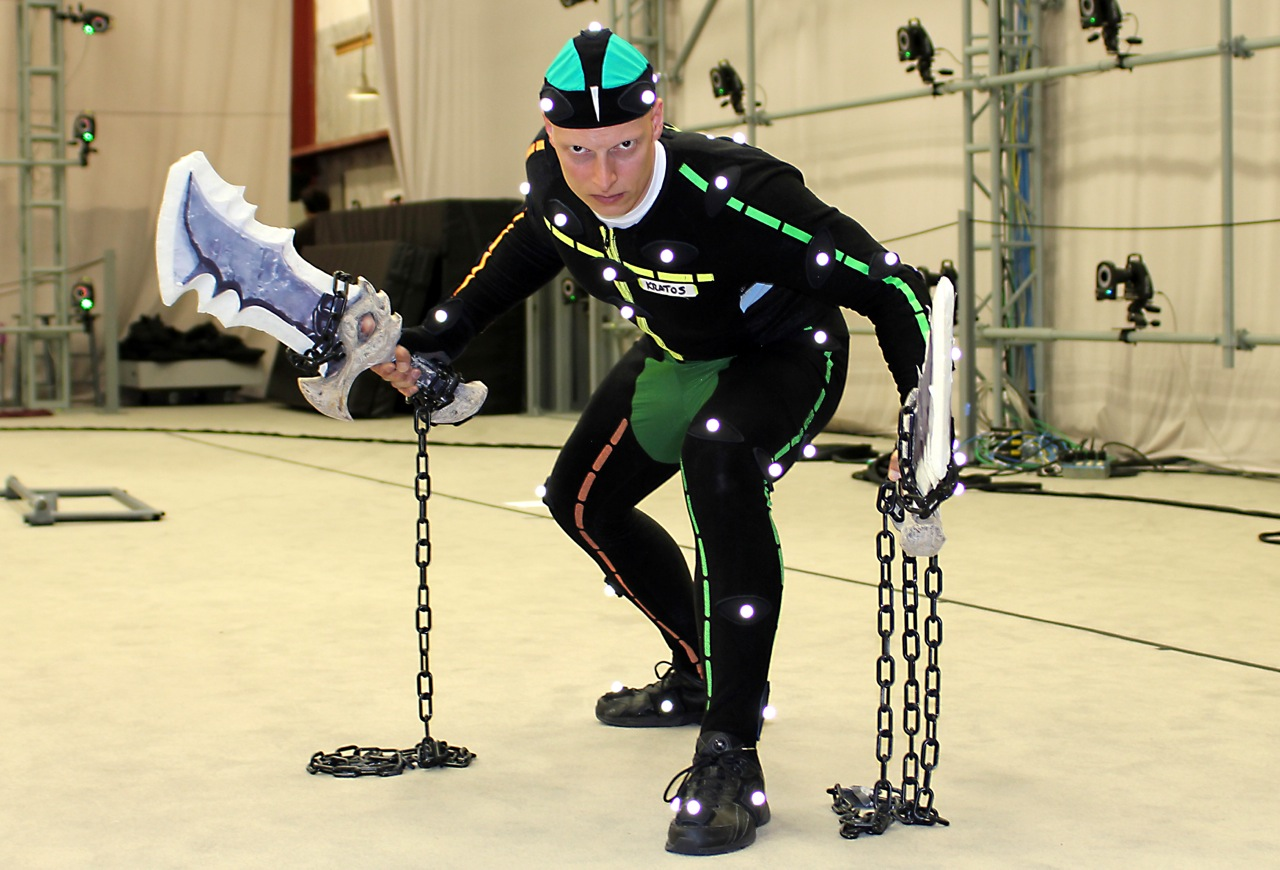
Joseph Gatt wearing a motion capture suit to depict Kratos in the game.

=== Pre-E3 2012 ===
In January 2010, Santa Monica's studio director John Hight told video-gaming blog Joystiq that "while God of War III will conclude the trilogy, it won't spell the end of the franchise" and said "We're going to be really careful about what we do next." From April 2011 until April 2012, several sources claimed that a fourth main entry would release sometime in 2012 and would feature an online component. On April 12, 2012, Sony released a teaser image on its official PlayStation Facebook page, which was followed by the game's announcement on April 19, though Amazon leaked the announcement the day before. The trailer announced Todd Papy, who had worked as a designer on God of War and God of War II and as Design Director on God of War III, as Game Director. David Jaffe confirmed that God of War III Game Director Stig Asmussen did not return to direct this game because he was working on another project at Santa Monica. The announcement trailer was narrated by Linda Hunt; it referred to a time before Kratos became the Ghost of Sparta and was not "bound in blood". The announcement officially confirmed that the game's title as God of War: Ascension. Papy said the game was not titled God of War IV to avoid confusion because it was a prequel, rather than a sequel, to the trilogy. The name was chosen because it complemented the story and the additional multiplayer component; according to Papy, in this mode, players are "basically ascending from an unknown hero to a god".

The game features a retooled God of War III engine, enabling online multiplayer battles for up to eight players. Papy said to allow customization, Kratos and other known gods were not included as playable characters in the multiplayer modes because the developers did not want different colored Kratoses, and selecting gods would lock players into established roles. This decision was made "to balance the game when players are pitted against each other". Papy also said there were no female characters because each character in the multiplayer mode was based on Kratos' animation model. The first demonstration of the game's multiplayer element featured the Team Favor of the Gods mode running on the map Desert of Lost Souls, which features the Titan cyclops Polyphemus. Multiplayer had been discussed for past games, but had never been implemented as previous game directors felt that God of War was a single-player-only experience; in Chains of Olympus's case, it was cut due to time constraints during development. For Ascension, the development team made the decision to invest in multiplayer after a simple version, tested using two Kratoses, turned out to be "a lot of fun" for the game testers.

The development team faced challenges in adding multiplayer to an established single-player franchise. Other established franchises had been criticized for sub-par multiplayer implementations, so Santa Monica felt they had to prove to critics that their multiplayer mode would not be "tacked on". Since multiplayer was new to the team, new staff were hired who specialized in multiplayer, engineering, and design, but Santa Monica did not realize the amount of work required for the experience they had envisioned. Development was delayed because multiplayer mode required several rewrites. The player navigation code had to be changed for online play, which was initially designed for co-op; the team eventually decided this was unsatisfactory, and the changed approach cost significant development time. Local co-op was also explored, but the team decided to keep multiplayer online-only. The team finally "found the heart of [the] final multiplayer game" shortly before the first press show. Development focus switched back and forth between single-player and multiplayer; single-player received less attention while the team were preparing multiplayer for the first press announcement, but when single-player mode was reemphasized prior to its public debut, multiplayer mode suffered.

David Jaffe, creator and Game Director of the original God of War, spoke with NowGamer prior to the first press announcement in late April. He said that if he had worked on Ascension, he would have incorporated three specific elements: different myths, a co-star, and "look to the Zelda structure as a jumping off point". He liked the idea of a cooperative mode, and added "I'd love to see player one be Kratos and player two be this stupid annoying sidekick that—for some to be determined story reason—Kratos is stuck with for the whole adventure and in the end, once the main quest is over, Kratos just snaps the poor kid's neck". In May 2012, Jaffe spoke with IGN about the multiplayer element: "I think it looks cool. It looks like another great, impeccably executed Sony Santa Monica game", and added, "If it turns out to be the case that the single player is watered down because of [multiplayer], then I think they have some justification. But I don't see any evidence of that, and I don't see evidence of that based on the team they are."

=== Post-E3 2012 ===
At Sony's 2012 Electronic Entertainment Expo (E3) press conference, the North American release date was confirmed as March 12, 2013. A single-player demo was shown, revealing new gameplay mechanics and combat systems. An encounter with the sea monster Charybdis was included in the demo, but this sequence was cut from the final game. Charybdis was recast as the creature that Alecto transforms into during the final fight of the game. The same day, Papy confirmed on PlayStation.Blog that a collector's edition of the game would be released. He said Ascension was being developed to feature stereoscopic 3D, but it was ultimately cut. At Gamescom 2012, new multiplayer footage was shown, followed by the announcement of a multiplayer beta.

Comparison of Kratos as he appears in God of War III (top) and Ascension (bottom). Increasing the UV sets gave Kratos a more realistic appearance in Ascension.

At the 2012 Penny Arcade Expo (PAX), Game Director Todd Papy, Lead Game Designer Mark Simon, Principal Character Artist Patrick Murphy, and writer of the God of War series Marianne Krawczyk, hosted the first God of War panel, discussing the origins of Ascension, and provided an overview of the evolution of Kratos. The Fury Megaera was revealed, and Mark Simon discussed the new combat system. Papy said he had considered using the goddess Artemis as a playable female character, which would have offered the player alternative combat options. Artemis would have been depicted as half-human and half-feline, with the head and torso of a woman and the legs of a lioness. Artemis was ultimately cut from the game, but Papy, at the time, said he would like to explore the possibility of using other gods in the future.

In the developmental transition from God of War III to Ascension, one of the graphics engineers, Cedric Perthuis, noted that the limits of the God of War III engine restricted artist creativity, so they "tried to remove or push those limits as far as possible without losing any performance." For example, the number of UV sets was increased to three per mesh. For a complex character model like Kratos, "independent textures [were] needed for body parts unique to him, each wrapping around the head, torso and limbs—all of which form an editable 'UV set' when laid out flat." Allowing more UV sets also made it possible to have a more natural look to the environment. Ascension was not as dramatic an advance in graphics over its predecessor as God of War III had been: "From a graphics 'technical' perspective, to a large degree God of War: Ascension was more refinement on the graphics front" said another graphics engineer, Ben Diamand, who focused on optimization during Ascension's development. The development team also added dynamic lighting, which allowed for development of the Life Cycle gameplay mechanic. Particle effects were also greatly improved from God of War III: "the idea was to give artists more control to achieve better results with less particles" said Perthuis.

Terrence C. Carson, Linda Hunt, Corey Burton, Gideon Emery, Steven Blum, and Kevin Sorbo reprised their roles as Kratos, the narrator, Zeus, Poseidon, Ares, and Hercules, respectively. Jennifer Hale, who voiced two characters in the previous installment, voiced the Fury Alecto and Kratos' wife, Lysandra, who was previously voiced by Gwendoline Yeo. Debi Mae West, Adrienne Barbeau, and Crispin Freeman, who had each done voice work on previous installments, voiced the characters Tisiphone, Aletheia, and the King of Sparta. Troy Baker voiced the oath keeper Orkos and is the announcer in the multiplayer mode. Series veteran Fred Tatasciore assumed the role of Hades, who was previously voiced by Clancy Brown. Susan Blakeslee reprised her role as the Village Oracle, who makes a cameo appearance as an illusion created by Tisiphone. Unlike previous games in which motion capture and voice recording were done separately, Ascension used "voice-over motion capture"; voice recording and motion capture were done at the same time, which allowed the voice actors to act out their characters' scenes together. The voice-over motion capture was done at House of Moves in Culver City, California.

=== Multiplayer beta ===
A global multiplayer beta was announced at Gamescom 2012. The beta included features that had not been previously revealed. Players who participated in the Rise of the Warrior social challenge on GodofWar.com received early access to the beta in December 2012. Players from SCE Europe also received an opportunity to access the beta early. The beta became available for PlayStation Plus subscribers on January 8, 2013. On January 19, Santa Monica allowed all PlayStation Network users in North and South America access to the beta via a redeemable voucher. The beta test ended at midnight Pacific time on January 21. In the beta, players could choose to align themselves with Ares or Zeus. It featured the eight-player Desert of Lost Souls map and the four-player Forum of Hercules map. The beta included the Desert of Lost Souls map in the modes Team Favor of the Gods and Capture the Flag, and the Forum of Hercules map in the mode Favor of the Gods, renamed Match of Champions in final release. All participants of the beta received the Champion's Armor and Blade for their multiplayer character when the game launched.

According to Santa Monica's senior producer Whitney Wade and director of internal development Chacko Sonny, the beta made the team look at the game as an "evolving service". The beta allowed the developers to make sure that the game design would meet with the approval of existing fans of the series, and that the system could cope with a high volume of players. Wade and Sonny said the testing went as expected, "revealing successive layers of issues that we would address, deploy fixes for, and then monitor in a live environment." The most important change from the beta, they said, was their planning in how to support the game post-launch. The team designed a process that allowed them to "quickly iterate on fixes, deploy them through infrastructure (testing, certification, patching), and coordinate with internal technology partners within Sony." They also developed a system to allow them to monitor, log, and interpret any changes added, and the beta test gave insight on how to prioritize key features.

== Soundtrack ==
God of War: Ascension (Original Soundtrack)

Soundtrack album by Tyler Bates
- Released: March 5, 2013
- Genre: Contemporary classical music
- Length: 1:05:35
- Labels: Sony Computer Entertainment and La-La Land Records

God of War: Ascension (Original Soundtrack) was composed by Tyler Bates and was released on iTunes on March 5, 2013 by SCE and La-La Land Records. It was included as DLC in the God of War: Ascension – Collector's Edition and Special Edition. On October 15, the soundtrack was made available for free on PSN for a limited time. A notable feature of Ascension's soundtrack at the time was that it was scored by only one composer; all the previous games had multiple composers. Tyler Bates previously scored the similarly themed film 300 and game Rise of the Argonauts. Bates said "My goal was to create a sound that supported the timeless dark age of God of War, while expanding the parameters of the 'Sword and Sandals' genre." Although the game's story is linear, he approached the project as if he were scoring a novel as opposed to a film. Bates did not play any of the previous games and chose not to in order to take the score "to new places without being overtly aware of the great music that is emblematic" of the prior installments. The soundtrack was recorded at Abbey Road Studios, and features solo vocal work from Rafe Pearlman and Ciscandra Nostalghia.

Throughout the score, Bates uses a combination of techniques "to increase the drama of the game" said Emily McMillan of Game Music Online, who gave the album a 4 out of 5 stars. She said one of Bates's signature techniques is "an intense and simultaneous crescendo and glissando." All the themes take place on a harmonic minor scale. On the track, "Warriors' Truth", Bates used Gerard Marino's main God of War theme and "twists it for the prequel setting", "taking the harmonic ascending scale and reverting it to a downwards pattern with a harsh choir/brass combination." The track "Visions of Ruin" features the cimbalom, which is rarely used in video game soundtracks. She said overall "The music is powerful, rich, and pulsing", though listening to the whole album can seem repetitive.

== Release ==
At E3 2012, a single-player demo was shown, featuring new gameplay mechanics and combat systems. The demo revealed a redesigned quick time event mini-game, which replaced some button prompts with a new, prompt-less, free-form system. It featured the World Weapons mechanic and Kratos was shown to be capable of swinging opponents through the air while simultaneously attacking. Other new features included the Fire of Ares magic and the "Life Cycle" mechanic. Several new enemies, such as the juggernaut and the sea beast Charybdis, were also featured, though the latter was cut from the final game. The E3 2012 single-player demo was included with early copies of the "Director's Cut" Blu-ray edition and Blu-ray/DVD Combo Pack versions of the film, Total Recall, which were released on December 18, 2012. On February 26, 2013, a new single-player demo titled the Prison of the Damned was released on the PlayStation Store to download. Participants of the Rise of the Warrior social challenge who were on the Spartan team received access to the demo on February 20. The demo comprises the first 30-minutes of the single-player mode.

God of War: Ascension was released in North America on March 12, 2013, in mainland Europe and PAL regions on March 13, in Australia and New Zealand on March 14, and in the UK and Ireland on March 15. On October 15, 2013, God of War: Ascension was released as a digital download on the PlayStation Store in North America. The digital version was released in Europe and Australia on October 23, and in Japan and Asia on October 31. On September 24, 2014, God of War: Ascension became available to play from Sony's game streaming service PlayStation Now.

=== Marketing ===
God of War: Ascension's marketing campaign initially focused on its multiplayer feature. Between October 22, 2012, and the day of the game's release, there were four multiplayer trailers that featured each of the gods that players can align to, showcasing some of the abilities that players receive from them. On December 12, 2012, a multiplayer trailer titled "Evil Ways" was released, featuring Polyphemus. The first single-player trailer since the initial one in April 2012 came on January 19, 2013. A live action trailer titled "From Ashes" featuring a remix of Hanging On by Ellie Goulding was played during Super Bowl XLVII, which was followed by the last single-player trailer on February 26.

On June 4, 2012, Santa Monica Studio announced the release of God of War: Ascension – Collector's Edition, which was available for a limited time in North America. The package included a 6-inch (150 mm) statue of Kratos, a premium SteelBook game case, and exclusive downloadable content (DLC) available via the PlayStation Network (PSN). The exclusive DLC included the official game soundtrack, a PS3 dynamic XrossMediaBar (XMB) theme, a PSN avatar pack, 48 hours of double XP for multiplayer, and a Season Pass to unlock all future DLC weapons and armor at no extra cost. On August 30, 2012, Santa Monica announced the release of the Collector's Edition for European territories. The God of War: Ascension – Special Edition was also announced for release in European territories and was available for the same price as the standard edition. It included the premium SteelBook game case and the DLC that was available in the Collector's Edition, although not the Season Pass. The God of War: Ascension Legacy Bundle, which included Ascension, God of War Saga, a one-month subscription to PlayStation Plus, and a 500 GB garnet red PS3, was available for a limited time. Similarly, the UK received an exclusive PS3 bundle, which included a white 500 GB PS3, the God of War: Ascension – Special Edition, and a special God of War: Ascension DualShock 3 controller, which was released separately in Australia.

Pre-orders for the Collector's Edition commenced on June 4, 2012, in North America. Participating retailers offered the "Mythological Heroes Multiplayer DLC Pack" as a bonus for pre-ordering the standard or Collector's Edition of the game. The DLC pack included the armors of Achilles, Odysseus, Orion, and Perseus. Along with the DLC pack, GameStop offered an exclusive pre-order bonus—the armor and spear of King Leonidas, as depicted by Gerard Butler in the 2007 film 300, for use in multiplayer mode, and a double-sided God of War: Ascension poster measuring 22 by 28 inches (56 cm × 71 cm). For a limited time, all copies of God of War: Ascension purchased from Best Buy included the multiplayer weapon Mjölnir (the Hammer of Thor), inspired by the television series Vikings, as DLC. Walmart offered the Blade of Judgment multiplayer weapon as an exclusive pre-order bonus. All copies of God of War: Ascension included early access to the demo of Naughty Dog's video game The Last of Us. In North America, all copies included a voucher to download the characters Zeus and Isaac Clarke for PlayStation All-Stars Battle Royale.

=== Rise of the Warrior ===
Rise of the Warrior was a graphic novel by Marianne Krawczyk with art by Christopher Shy. Only available on GodofWar.com, (Note: As of 2015, Rise of the Warrior is no longer available on GodofWar.com.) it was a prequel story that tied into Ascension's single-player and multiplayer modes, and had 20 chapters that were released from October 2012 to March 2013. It also featured a social experience during that same time period. For the social experience, players were aligned with either the Spartans or the Trojans and competed via social challenges to earn points, such as answering questions and solving riddles for each chapter. In the first challenge, the teams competed to earn their army a week of exclusive, early access to the multiplayer beta test that began on December 12, and a one-month subscription to PlayStation Plus, which was won by the Spartans; the Trojans received access on December 17. The Spartans also won the next team challenge and received early access to the Prison of the Damned single-player demo on February 20, 2013. Players could also earn early, in-game unlocks for the final game's multiplayer mode, including exclusive weapons and armor for all players who attained the rank of Champion of the Gods.

The story followed an unnamed warrior who became the player's character in the multiplayer mode. The warrior was a native of Kirra whose father was killed by a cruel general who poisoned the water supply of the village, killing many people. Before dying, the warrior's father beckoned him to honor the gods and swear to never let harm come to their family. The warrior swore his father's oath and was met by a cloaked figure, The Giver, who guided him and followed him throughout his journey. Soon after, the warrior called upon Ares to save his people from the poisonous water; the god destroyed the aqueduct and water wheel that supplied water to the village. The warrior then encountered the surviving soldiers who had been under his father's command. One soldier told the warrior that swords alone could not defeat the general. The warrior and his men traveled to the land of Aeaea and recruited the witch Circe, who seemingly also sought revenge against the general. Circe granted the soldiers magical weapons to aid them on their journey, and suggested that they see the Oracle of Delphi to discover whether the general had any weaknesses. During this time, the warrior vowed loyalty to Poseidon and to protect his men.

After traveling through Delphi, the warrior obtained the venomous blood of a cerberus. Eventually, both Circe and the warrior encountered the general, who was revealed to be the warrior's uncle. The general revealed that he killed the warrior's father because he refused to join the general. Circe was then revealed to be the general's lover who had aided the warrior only so he would reach the general, who planned to offer the warrior a chance to serve him in his conquests. The warrior refused, and Circe offered him with a choice; to serve the general and his men would be spared from Circe's wrath, or to kill the general and his men shall die. The Giver, who followed the two, reminded the warrior that if he were to kill the general, who was a member of his family, the oath he made to his father would be broken, yet if he killed Circe, his men would perish and the oath he made to protect his men would be broken. The warrior declared that he would not slay Circe and defended the lives of his men. However, he tricked the general into drinking from a cup he had secretly filled with the cerberus's blood, which killed the general. Circe was aghast at the warrior's vengeful act and retreated. Because the warrior killed his own uncle, the oath he made to his father was broken. The Giver revealed himself to be Orkos, the oath keeper of the Furies and the warrior was imprisoned by the Furies in the Prison of the Damned.

=== Downloadable content ===
As well as the downloadable content (DLC) included in the Collector's Edition, the pre-order bonuses, and DLC from Rise of the Warrior, the developers released several multiplayer DLC packs after the game's release. All multiplayer maps that were released post-launch were free, and players who obtained the Season Pass from the Collector's Edition received all DLC weapons and armors at no additional cost. DLC weapons and armors could be purchased separately or in bundles. Other DLC, such as XP boosters, were available, but these were not covered by the Season Pass. On May 7, 2013, the first set of DLC armors and weapons, including the "Armors of Anarchy" and the "Blades of Darkness", were released for purchase together with the free Chimeran Armor. Several other DLC packs, such as the "Primordials Pack", the "Champions Pack", the "Marks of the Gods Pack", and the "Legendary Spears Pack", were released.

In June 2013, Santa Monica announced the "Community Cape Design Contest", in which the God of War community could create and submit original cape designs. The winner's design was released as DLC. For a limited time the following month, Sony allowed players to trial all available DLC weapons. Some of the last sets of DLC released included co-op weapons, the "Mantles of the Gods Pack", several gauntlets, and the "Fury Capes Pack". On October 11, 2013, Santa Monica announced that no further DLC maps, weapons, armors, or marks would be produced, but multiplayer gaming would still be supported with patch updates. All DLC items received special pricing options for the release of the digital version of God of War: Ascension. To celebrate the one year anniversary of the game's release, from March 25 through April 2, all DLC armor and weapons were available to download for free, XP boosters were discounted by 50%, and the developers released a Santa Monica Studio cape and a "Marked One" mark, allowing player's warriors to have Kratos' red tattoo when equipped.

The first maps were released via patch 1.06, called the "Hunter" update, on May 23, 2013. The "Tower of Delphi" and a modified version of the "Coliseum of Persia", which enabled the Trial of the Gods mode on that map, were included in this update. Because of technical difficulties experienced by some players who downloaded the patch, it was retracted and re-released via update 1.07 on June 3. Players who lost all online progress due to 1.06 received two 48-hour voucher codes granting five times the amount of XP earned, the Season Pass, 50 weapon and armor shards, and a special voucher code for the "Ascension" feature that ascended these players to "Hero", giving them immediate access to the Godly armor and weapons. The second set of maps were released via update 1.09 on July 11. This update included four maps for the Bout of Honor mode—"Canyons of Kirra", "Chamber of the Flame", "Landing at Delos", and "Streets of Sparta"—and a four-player map, "The Whirlpool of Alecto". On August 1, update 1.10 was released and added Trial of the Gods to the "Labyrinth of Daedalus" map. The last multiplayer map, the eight-player "Furnace of Archimedes", was released via update 1.11 on August 27.

== Reception ==
Reception

Aggregate score
Aggregator	Score
Metacritic	80/100

Review scores
Publication	Score
Destructoid	9/10
Edge	7/10
GameSpot	8.0/10
GamesRadar+	3.5/5
GameTrailers	8.3/10
IGN	7.8/10
Joystiq	3.5/5
PlayStation Official Magazine – UK	8/10

=== Critical reception ===
God of War: Ascension received "generally favorable" reviews from critics, according to review aggregator website Metacritic. Critics praised the fundamental gameplay and spectacle, but were critical of the lack of new ideas and gave a mixed response to the additional multiplayer mode. Alex Simmons of IGN said the redesigned combat system adds a source of depth: "Learning how to use each power effectively ... provides a strategic lifeline when there's no energy re-gen chest nearby". Although he initially found the World Weapons useful, he felt that they became unnecessary after upgrading the Blades of Chaos. Simmons felt the magic system was a "positive step"; since magic attacks are unlocked at a later time, players cannot rely on them as much as they may have done in previous installments, which encourages players "to think wisely about where to allocate experience points rather than being the ultimate badass from the outset".

Combat and the new gameplay mechanics were well-received, with Dale North of Destructoid saying "God of War has never looked or played better than this", and Xav de Matos of Joystiq commenting that the combat is simpler than in God of War III, and rarely required much adjustment. Opinions on difficulty varied; Simmons felt that most of the gameplay was balanced, and that Ascension "is probably the easiest" in the series, but both he and Hollander Cooper of GamesRadar commented that some areas, such as the Trials of Archimedes, were too difficult. Simmons felt that in some sections, the many enemies made dying feel "cheap and frustrating", and in Cooper's opinion, some points in the game "[test] your patience, rather than your skills—including one [the Trials] that's easily the most difficult section in any God of War game to date, for all the wrong reasons".

Both Simmons and Matos criticized the story; Simmons felt that although the narrative is "meticulously delivered", it "felt a bit incidental", and said that in comparison to Zeus and Ares, "the Furies don't quite cut it". Matos was critical of the plot framing and the narrative structure as "just too chaotic"; he argued that "the narrative fabric woven throughout the franchise has begun to split", and Ascension does little to enhance its characters "in any meaningful way". He did praise the game for providing the "distinct God of War flair" known to the series.

Cooper praised the enhanced graphics engine as "not only the best the franchise has seen, but some of the most impressive on the PlayStation 3", and was impressed by Kratos' foes. North agreed, saying "there's a shine and polish that runs throughout the game that makes it a perfect send-off for the PS3", noting its improved textures, animations, and lighting. The review from Edge magazine also positively reviewed the graphics, but had some frustrations with the visual approach, such as some camera angles.

Matos was broadly critical of the game's multiplayer mode, though he singled out some elements, such as the maps, as well-designed. He disliked the connection to single-player mode, calling it "a weird narrative tie-in", and was concerned that although the gameplay translates well into the multiplayer element, "the entire experience may be too chaotic to enrapture a large audience ... it doesn't feel deep enough to command much more than a furiously dedicated fan following". Simmons was more positive, saying that the multiplayer mode is "a genuinely fresh addition ... that successfully carries over many of the hallmarks of the much-loved single-player [game]". He singled out Team Favor of the Gods as his favorite mode, but did not feel that the combat offered enough depth to make multiplayer "a truly engaging experience", describing it instead as "a curiosity that provides a few hours of enjoyment rather than being an essential addition". The review from Edge magazine described multiplayer mode as "chaotic at first", with overwhelming options, but said that it becomes easier as players learn the levels. The Edge review identified the fixed camera system as an asset because "you can always see exactly what's going on and fight your opponents instead of the viewpoint", and also praised the color-coding system, which "effectively lets you know when you have an opening and when to run".

=== Controversy ===
Some reviewers disliked the title of one of the game's trophies, "Bros before Hos", which is received after graphically face-stomping a female villain. In response to the accusations of misogyny, Santa Monica released a patch changing the name of the trophy to "Bros before Foes".

=== Sales ===
In the United States, God of War: Ascension sold 570,000 units in the first month of its release not including bundled sales, making it the fourth best-selling game of March 2013. The game's sales were significantly lower than God of War III's first month sales, which were 1.1 million units. Ultimately, the game shipped over 3 million units worldwide and grossed over US$100 million in revenue.

=== Accolades ===
Unlike previous installments, God of War: Ascension won no awards, but it was nominated in several Best of E3 2012 categories by various media outlets. These nominations included "Best Action/Adventure" and "Best Multiplayer" from Game Rant, "Best PS3 Game" and "Best Action/Adventure Game" from G4, "Best PlayStation 3 Game" from Destructoid, and "Best PS3 Game" and "Best Action Game" from IGN. The game was a nominee for "Best Visual Design" at the 2013 Golden Joystick Awards. At the 2014 Writers Guild of America Videogame Awards, it was a nominee for "Outstanding Achievement in Videogame Writing". During the 17th Annual D.I.C.E. Awards, God of War: Ascension received a nomination for "Outstanding Achievement in Sound Design" by the Academy of Interactive Arts & Sciences.
