= Joseph Gatt =

English actor (born 1971)

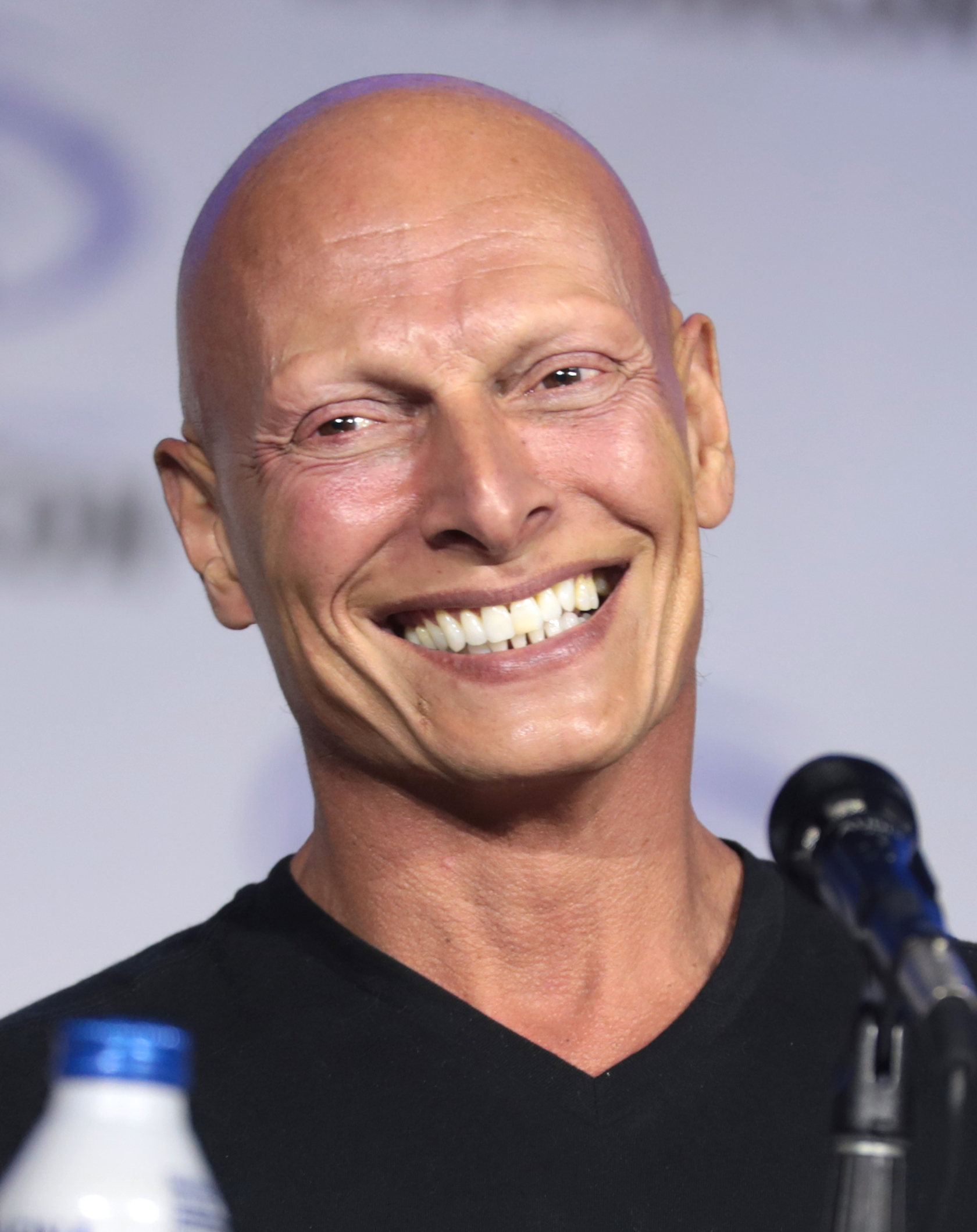
- Gatt at the 2022 WonderCon
- Born: 3 December 1971 (age 54); Notting Hill, London, England
- Occupation: Actor
- Years active: 1999–Present
- Partner(s): Mercy Malick (2009–present)

Joseph Gatt (born 3 December 1971) is an English actor. He is best known for his roles in the films Star Trek Into Darkness (2013) and Dumbo (2019), and the television series Banshee and Game of Thrones. Gatt has also provided motion capture for multiple video games, including the God of War series.

== Early life ==
Gatt was born in the Notting Hill area of London on 3 December 1971, the son of Maltese immigrant parents; his father is from Paola and his mother is from Lija. While growing up, he spent summers with his family in Malta. He was diagnosed with alopecia universalis at the age of 12. He trained as an actor at the Sylvia Young Theatre School before joining the Mountview Academy of Theatre Arts, where he graduated with a bachelor's degree.

== Career ==
After graduating from drama school, Gatt's first film role was in Orpheus & Eurydice (2000), playing opposite Oliver Reed in one of Reed's last films. He has performed in many musicals in London's West End and in national tours.

== Personal life ==
Gatt lives in Los Angeles with Mercy Malick, his girlfriend, since around 2009.

In February 2024, the Los Angeles Deputy District Attorney dismissed all charges against Gatt stemming from an arrest in April 2022 for allegedly having sexually explicit chats with a minor online. It was proven through forensic examination that the conversations had been fabricated by the then 16-year-old girl whom Gatt described as an "obsessed fan". In April 2024, Gatt filed a lawsuit against the Los Angeles District Attorney and former Deputy District Attorney for $40 million over false pedophile claims which severely damaged his reputation as an actor.

== Filmography ==
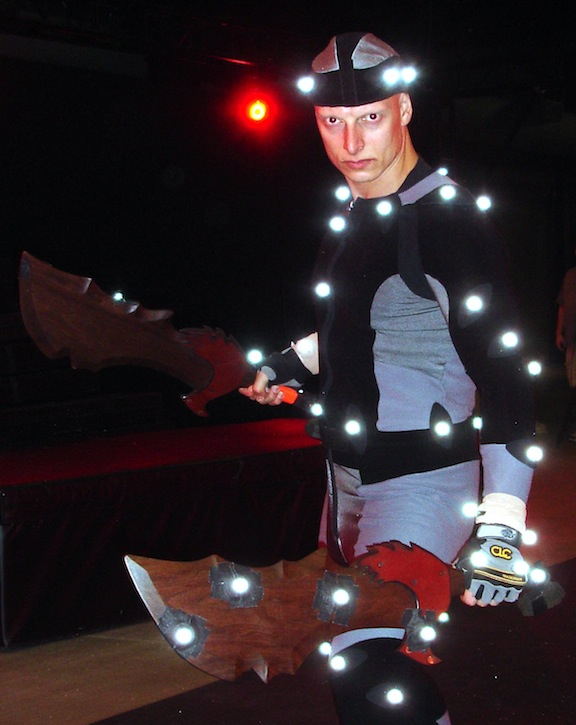
Gatt wearing the motion-capture suit for Kratos in 2010

=== Film ===
Year	Title	Role	Notes
1999	Plunkett & Macleane	Pimp	
2000	Orpheus & Eurydice	Charon	
2000	Jason and the Argonauts	Atlas	Television film
2003	Kal Ho Naa Ho	Dancer	
2006	Saurian	Belrog	Television film
2006	Pulse	Dark Figure	
2008	Killing Ariel	Incubus	
2011	Thor	Frost Giant Grundroth	
2011	I Am Singh	Leif Lungren	
2013	Agent 88	Mr.Finch	Short film
2013	The Big Lug	Hardknock	Short film
2013	Star Trek Into Darkness	Science Officer 0718	
2014	Finders Keepers	Officer Cobbs	Television film
2015	The Most Dangerous Game	Ivan	
2015	Mr. Hollywood	Vincent	Short film
2015	For All Eyes Always	Nikos Papalexopoulous	
2015	Finding Eden	Fred	
2015	Stormageddon	Cain/Abel	Television film
2017	3 Hours Until Dead	Ivan	
2017	Espionage Tonight	Nikos Papalexopoulous	
2018	Liberty	Dr. Alexei Andropov	
2018	Harnessing the Rain	Reed	
2018	Infrared	David	
2019	Dumbo	Neils Skellig	
2021	The Retaliators	Ram Kady	
2022	Titanic 666	Brian Andrews	
2022	Black Adam	Intergang Squad Leader	

=== Television ===
Year	Title	Role	Notes
1999	The Bill	Len Miller	Episode: "Piggy in the Middle"
2001	999	Duncan Goodhew	Episode: "Duncan Gooddeed"
2002	Being April	Street Artist	Episode: "Normal"
2005	Captain Scarlet	Captain Scarlet	13 episodes
2008	On the Bench	Lester	Episode: "Steven Cohen"
2008	The Dark Path Chronicles	Luke	7 episodes
2011	Wonder Woman	John O'Quinn	Episode: "TV Pilot"
2011	Eagleheart	Romulus	Episode: "Susie's Song"
2011	Pretend Time	Creepy Man	Episode: "Full Blown Eggs"
2011	Easy to Assemble	Lars	3 episodes
2011	Chuck	Agent Hawk	Episode: "Chuck Versus the Curse"
2012	Breaking In	Foreign Guy	Episode: "Episode XIII"
2013	The Silicon Assassin Project	The Enforcer	Episode: "The Medusa Meeting"
2013–2014	Banshee	The Albino	5 episodes
2013	Banshee Origins: Olek Drops a Dime	The Albino	Miniseries
2014	Banshee Origins	The Albino	Episode "The Phone Call"
2014	Game of Thrones	Thenn Warg	3 episodes
2014	Teen Wolf	The Mute	3 episodes
2014–2015	The 100	Tristan	3 episodes
2015	Real Rob	Steve	Episode: "Gaying in Shape"
2015	Strike Back	Eduardo Lautrec	Episode #5.10
2015	Ray Donovan	Randy	Episode: "Ding"
2015	True Detective	Bogden	Episode: "Church in Ruins"
2016	Stan Lee's Lucky Man	Yury Becker	5 episodes
2016	Second Chance	Caleb the Widowmaker	Episode #1.06
2016	Z Nation	"The Man"	6 episodes
2019	NCIS: New Orleans	Victor Zelko	2 episodes

=== Video games ===
Year	Title	Role	Notes
2000	Driver 2	Tanner	Motion capture
2004	Driv3r	Tanner	Motion capture
2005	Sniper Elite		Motion capture
2006	24: The Game	Jack Bauer / Tony Almeida	Motion capture
2006	Killzone: Liberation	Various	Motion capture
2006	Socom U.S. Navy Seals: Fireteam Bravo 2	Various	Motion capture
2007	God of War II	Kratos	Motion capture
2007	Lair	Rhon	Motion capture
2008	Metal Gear Solid 4: Guns of the Patriots	Ravensword Enforcer/Body of Armor Athlete	Live action opening movie
2008	God of War: Chains of Olympus	Kratos	Motion capture
2010	God of War III	Kratos	Motion capture
2010	God of War: Ghost of Sparta	Kratos	Motion capture
2011–2015	The Elder Scrolls V: Skyrim	Councillor Morvayn	Voice
2011	Star Wars: The Old Republic	Lord Scourge / Additional Voices	Voice
2012	Playstation All-Stars Battle Royale	Kratos	Motion capture
2013	God of War: Ascension	Kratos	Motion capture
2013	Star Wars: The Old Republic - Rise of the Hutt Cartel	Lord Scourge	Voice
2014–2015	Elder Scrolls Online	Additional Voices	Voice
2016	Elder Scrolls Online: Dark Brotherhood	Speaker Terenus	Voice
2016	Star Trek Online: Agents of Yesterday	Science Officer 0718	Voice
