= Terrence C. Carson =

American actor

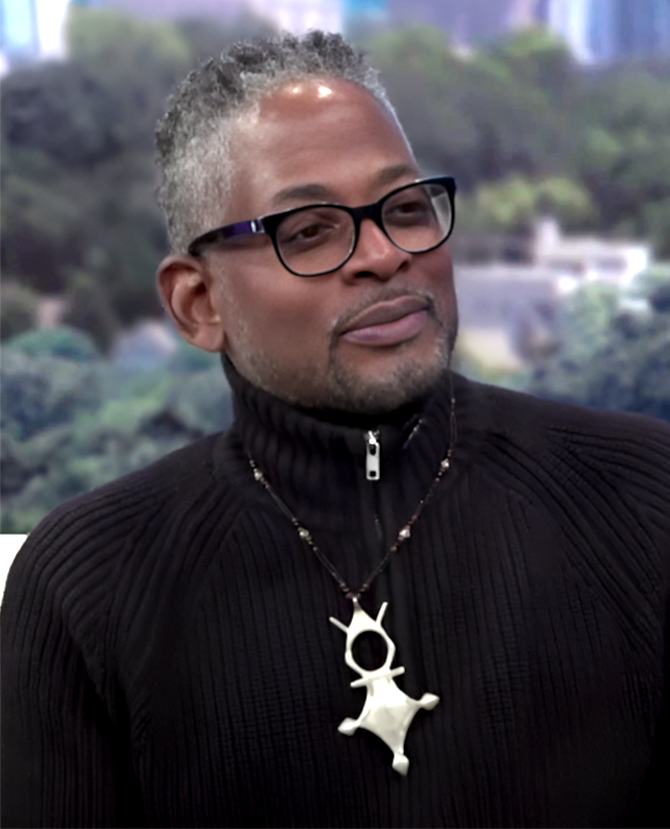
- Carson in 2019
- Born: Chicago, Illinois, U.S.
- Occupations: Actor, singer
- Years active: 1989–present
- Known for: Living Single
- Website: www.officialtccarson.com

Terrence "T.C." Carson is an American actor known for his performances across television, film, stage, and video games. He is best known for portraying Kyle Barker on the Fox sitcom, Living Single, and is the original voice of Kratos in the God of War video game series, playing the role in every installment set within the Greek pantheon. Additionally, Carson lent his voice to Mace Windu in various Star Wars media, including Star Wars: The Clone Wars.

== Early life and education ==
Born and raised in Chicago, Illinois, Terrence "T.C." Carson was the only child of his mother, who brought him up in the LeClaire Courts projects of the Chicago Housing Authority. He credits his mother, who was a seamstress and a nurse's aid, with instilling in him a love of the arts. He pursued higher education at the University of Illinois at Urbana–Champaign, majoring in architecture and interior design, and in 1981 became a member of the Iota Phi Theta fraternity.

== Career ==
Carson's artistic journey began on stage, where he showcased his talents in numerous plays and musicals. His performances include roles in The Wiz, Dreamgirls, and Ain't Misbehavin'. He also toured nationally with productions such as Sesame Street Live.

=== Television ===
Carson is best known for his role as Kyle Barker on the hit sitcom Living Single, which aired from 1993 to 1998. His portrayal of the suave stockbroker earned him critical acclaim and a dedicated fan base. Years later, he would characterize his departure as a firing. He also appeared in other television series, including Greenleaf, where he had a recurring role, and guest appearances on shows like Black Lightning and Nashville.

=== Voice acting ===
In addition to his on-screen roles, Carson has an extensive voice acting portfolio. His most prominent voice role is that of Kratos in the God of War video game series, a character he originally portrayed from 2005 until 2013. His first voicing of Kratos was for the original God of War for the PlayStation 2 and continued the role until God of War: Ascension for the PlayStation 3, in which he also did the motion capture. Christopher Judge took over the role in God of War for the PlayStation 4 in 2018 and its 2022 sequel God of War Ragnarök. Carson also provided Kratos's voice where Kratos was a downloadable character in Everybody's Golf 5 and a guest character in Soulcalibur: Broken Destiny, the PlayStation 3 and PlayStation Vita versions of Mortal Kombat, and PlayStation All-Stars Battle Royale. Carson returned as Kratos in the God of War series for the 2026 title, God of War Sons of Sparta, and will reprise the role again for the upcoming God of War Trilogy Remake.

Carson voiced Mace Windu in the 2003 animated series Star Wars: Clone Wars; he reprised his role as Mace Windu in the 2008 Star Wars: The Clone Wars series. He has provided the male voice of Guillo in the GameCube RPG Baten Kaitos Origins and is the voice of Touchstone in the PlayStation Portable shooter Syphon Filter: Dark Mirror. Carson provided the voices of Samuel and Mr. Carson in the PBS Kids animated series Clifford the Big Red Dog.

=== Film ===
Carson's filmography includes roles in movies such as Livin' Large! (1991), U-571 (2000), and Final Destination 2 (2003), where he played Eugene Dix, a schoolteacher and one of the survivors of the Route 23 crash. Carson portrayed Marcus Elkins in the A Wesley Christmas film series, beginning with A Wesley Christmas (2022), A Wesley Christmas Wedding (2023), and A Wesley South African Christmas (2024). He earned an NAACP Image Award nomination for his role at the 54th NAACP Image Awards in 2023. In 2024, Carson made his directorial debut with The Love Doctor, a feature film written by David L. Rowell and Anthony Guilianti.

=== Music ===
As a vocalist, Carson has released a few albums and singles showcasing his jazz and funk influences. His discography includes:

- Truth (2002): A jazz/funk album featuring a mix of ballads, mid-tempo tracks, African rhythms, and dance funk tunes.
- Live in Beverly Hills (2014): A live recording capturing Carson's dynamic performance style.
- Come Together (2020): A single blending jazz, R&B, and soul influences offering a message of unity and connection in the aftermath of George Floyd's killing in May 2020.
- InnerCity Jazz (LIVE) (2024): An eclectic mix of classics and new grooves.

Carson's performance of "My Funny Valentine" on Living Single remains a fan-favorite moment from the series, showcasing his rich, velvety baritone and jazz-influenced vocal style. As his character, Kyle Barker, serenades Maxine Shaw (Erika Alexander) with the classic ballad, the scene captures the depth of their complex romance, blending passion, vulnerability, and undeniable chemistry.

== Awards and honors ==
Throughout his career, Carson has received several accolades:

- Emmy Award for "Fast Break to Glory"
- Three-time NAACP Image Award nominee:
  - Outstanding Supporting Actor in a Television Movie, Limited-Series or Dramatic Special for A Wesley Christmas
  - Two nominations for Outstanding Actor in a Comedy Series for Living Single
- Young Artist Award for Outstanding Young Ensemble Cast for A Mother's Courage: The Mary Thomas Story
- Joseph Jefferson Award for his performance in The Colored Museum at the Victory Gardens Theater

In 2017, Carson was featured on the cover of STS Entertainment & Fashion magazine.

== Discography ==
- Truth (2002)
- Live in Beverly Hills (2014)

== Filmography ==
=== Film ===
Year	Title	Role	Notes
1991	Livin' Large	Dexter Jackson	
1997	Gang Related	Manny Ladrew	
1998	Relax...It's Just Sex	Buzz Wagner	
2000	U-571	Seaman Eddie Carson	
2003	Final Destination 2	Eugene Dix	
2007	What Love Is	Kwame	Credited as T.C. Carson
2016	Justice League vs. Teen Titans	Ra's al Ghul	Voice
2022	A Wesley Christmas	Marcus Elkins	
2023	A Wesley Christmas Wedding	Marcus Elkins	
2023	Onyx the Fortuitous and the Talisman of Souls	Mr. Duke	
2024	A Wesley South African Christmas	Marcus Elkins	

=== Television ===
Year	Title	Role	Notes
1993	Key West	Abednigo 'JoJo' Nabuli	Main role (13 episodes)
1993–1998	Living Single	Kyle Barker	Main role (108 episodes)
1995	Happily Ever After: Fairy Tales for Every Child	Tree	Voice, episode: "Beauty and the Beast"
1995–1998	Life with Louie	Norton Jensen, Gus	Voice, 16 episodes (Note: Credited as T.C. Carson)
1999	Rugrats	Officer Dan	Voice, episode: "Officer Chuckie"
2000–2002	Clifford the Big Red Dog	Fire Chief Campbell, Mr. Carson the Mailman, Samuel/Charley's Dad	Voice, 2 episodes
2005	Half & Half	Kyle Barker	Episode: "The Big Performance Anxiety Episode"
2005	Star Wars: Clone Wars	Mace Windu, Saesee Tin, General Oro Dassyne	Voice, 4 episodes
2007	Afro Samurai	Swordsmaster, Brother #4	Voice, 3 episodes; English dub
2008–2010	The Life & Times of Tim	Jazz Musician	Voice, 2 episodes
2008–2014, 2020	Star Wars: The Clone Wars	Mace Windu, Cultist, Council Member, Tactical Droid	Voice, 45 episodes
2011	The Mentalist	Joe Reyes	Episode: "Bloodsport"
2017	Greenleaf	Reggie	3 episodes
2018	Black Lightning	Eldridge	Episode: "And Then the Devil Brought the Plague: The Book of Green Light"
2022	Star Wars: Tales of the Jedi	Mace Windu	Voice, episode: "Choices"
2025	She the People	Danny	2 episodes

=== Video games ===
Year	Title	Role	Notes
2000	Star Trek: Klingon Academy	Academy Engineer, Gorkon Allied Command, Starbase 2	
2002	Pirates: The Legend of Black Kat	Witch Doctor, Voodoo Master	
2002	Lilo & Stitch: Trouble in Paradise	Cobra Bubbles	
2002	Lilo & Stitch: Hawaiian Adventure	Cobra Bubbles	
2002	Star Wars: The Clone Wars	Mace Windu	
2002	Star Wars: Galactic Battlegrounds	Mace Windu, Darth Vader	(Note: Credited as TC Carson)
2004	EverQuest II	Grimgash the Black	
2005	God of War	Kratos	
2005	Star Wars Episode III: Revenge of the Sith	Mace Windu	
2005	Star Wars: Battlefront II	Mace Windu	
2005	The Outfit	JD Tyler	
2006	Baten Kaitos Origins	Guillo (male)	English dub
2006	Syphon Filter: Dark Mirror	Touchstone	
2006	Saints Row	Anthony Green	
2006	Eragon	Ajijad	
2007	God of War II	Kratos	
2007	Unreal Tournament 3	Othello	
2008	God of War: Chains of Olympus	Kratos	
2008	Everybody's Golf 5	Kratos	DLC character
2008	Star Wars: The Clone Wars – Jedi Alliance	Mace Windu	
2008	Star Wars: The Clone Wars – Lightsaber Duels	Mace Windu	
2009	Afro Samurai	Swordsmaster, Assassin	
2009	Soulcalibur: Broken Destiny	Kratos	Guest character
2009	Star Wars: The Clone Wars – Republic Heroes	Mace Windu	
2010	God of War III	Kratos	
2010	God of War: Ghost of Sparta	Kratos	
2010	Tron: Evolution	Calchas	Uncredited
2010	Tron Evolution: Battle Grids	Calchas	
2011	Mortal Kombat	Kratos	Guest character; reused lines from God of War 3
2012	Kinect Star Wars	Mace Windu	
2012	PlayStation All-Stars Battle Royale	Kratos	
2013	God of War: Ascension	Kratos	
2013	BioShock Infinite	Street Preacher Ray	
2013	Saints Row IV	Anthony Green	
2015	Disney Infinity 3.0	Mace Windu	
2016	Far Cry Primal	Tensay	
2017	Agents of Mayhem	Agent Hardtack (Ishmael Funderburke), Vasquez	
2022	Lego Star Wars: The Skywalker Saga	Mace Windu	
2023	Justice League: Cosmic Chaos	John Stewart / Green Lantern	
2024	Star Wars: Battlefront Classic Collection	Mace Windu	
2026	God of War Sons of Sparta	Kratos	
TBA	God of War Trilogy Remake	Kratos	

=== Web ===
Year	Title	Role	Notes
2026	Vader Episode II: Echoes of the Jedi	Mace Windu	Star Wars Theory web film
