= Kratos (God of War) =

Protagonist of the God of War series

- God of War character
- Kratos with the Leviathan Axe, as he primarily appears in the Norse era of the series
- First game: God of War (2005)
- Created by: David Jaffe
- Based on: Fárbauti of Norse mythology (2018–present)
- Designed by: Charlie Wen
- Voiced by: Terrence C. Carson (2005–2013, 2026); Christopher Judge (2018–present); Antony Del Rio (child, 2010, 2026)
- Motion capture: Brandon Molale (2005); Joseph Gatt (2007–2010); Terrence C. Carson (2013); Christopher Judge (2018–present); Eric Jacobus (2018–2023)
- Live-action actor: Dave Bautista (TV series)

In-universe information
- Alias: Ghost of Sparta
- Species: God (former demigod)
- Family: Zeus (father); Athena (sister); Deimos (brother)
- Spouses: Lysandra; Laufey "Faye" the Just
- Children: Calliope (daughter); Atreus "Loki" (son)
- Origin: Sparta, Greece
- Nationality: Greek

Kratos (Ancient Greek: Κράτος, lit. 'strength') is a character and the protagonist of Santa Monica Studio's video game series God of War, which is based on Greek mythology and Norse mythology. He first appeared in the 2005 video game God of War, which led to the development of nine more titles featuring the character as the protagonist with a 10th in development. Kratos also appears as the protagonist of two God of War comic book series (2010 and 2018–2021) and in three novels that retell the events of three of the games.

The character was originally voiced by Terrence C. Carson during the Greek era from 2005 to 2013, and by Christopher Judge for the Norse era that began in 2018. Carson returned in 2026 for the side-game Sons of Sparta, a prequel that takes place during the Greek era, and he will also be re-recording his lines for the remake of the original Greek trilogy that is currently in development. Antony Del Rio voiced a young Kratos in Ghost of Sparta (2010) and reprised the role in Sons of Sparta. Dave Bautista is set to play the live-action version of the character in the upcoming television adaptation of the Norse era.

Throughout the Greek era of the series, Kratos is portrayed as a Spartan warrior who becomes known as the "Ghost of Sparta" after Ares, his former mentor, tricks him into murdering his family. Kratos later avenges their deaths, kills Ares, and becomes the new God of War. Kratos is eventually revealed to be one of the sons of Zeus, who later betrays him in an effort to prevent a prophecy of Kratos killing him. Kratos embarks on several adventures in attempts to avert disaster or to change his fate, and is generally portrayed as a tragic figure. Vengeance is a central theme of the Greek era; installments focus on Kratos's origins, and his relationships with his family and the Olympian gods. In the Norse era, Kratos finds himself controlling his rage and learning how to be a father and mentor to his son, Atreus, whom he helps to come to terms with his divinity. During their journey, Kratos and Atreus combat monsters and gods of the Norse realm, which leads to the catastrophic battle of Ragnarök. Redemption is a main theme of the Norse era and Kratos comes to terms with his godhood, eventually becoming the Norse God of War and championing the ideals of hope.

The God of War franchise is a flagship title for the PlayStation brand and Kratos is one of its most popular characters. The character has been well received by critics, becoming a video game icon, and has had several cameos in games outside the God of War series. Judge's performance as Kratos in the two Norse-based games was highly praised, and received numerous awards and nominations.

== Concept and design ==
Early concept art by Kratos's original designer/creator Charlie Wen, depicting unused variations of Kratos; these would later be used as bonus costumes in God of War III in bonus play

When designing Kratos, God of War (2005) creator and game director David Jaffe attempted to create a brutal-looking character that did not resemble a typical traditional Greek hero. Jaffe wanted the character to be individualistic so Kratos would not wear traditional armor. Use of a fully masked character was initially approved but the concept was abandoned because the design seemed "soulless" and lacked a "defined personality". Some models included unconventional elements, such as Kratos carrying an infant on his back, while others had excessive detail, such as long hair and other "flowing things".

Charlie Wen, the director of visual development on God of War (2005) and God of War II, was responsible for designing Kratos. Wen said his direction for the design was influenced by similarly themed films and by pop culture. Wen made concept drawings of Kratos on napkins at a restaurant, having forgotten his sketchbook; he introduced the idea of the character's double-chained blades and eventually produced Kratos's iconic design. Double-chained blades were chosen as Kratos's signature weapon because they emphasized the character's animalistic nature while allowing combat to remain fluid. Wen visualized the double-chained blades simultaneously activating as Kratos threw them with a balance of ferocity and accuracy. Jaffe said of the final version of the character:

[Kratos] may not totally feel at home in Ancient Greece from a costume standpoint, I think he achieves the greater purpose which is to give players a character who they can play who really does just let them go nuts and unleash the nasty fantasies that they have in their head.

Wen gave Kratos his most-noticeable feature, his ashen complexion, a story development that earns Kratos the title Ghost of Sparta. The character's other distinctive features include a scar across his right eye and a large, red tattoo that threads from his left eye, circles the left side of his torso, and ends at his left shoulder. The tattoo was originally blue but was changed to red late in production. In the series lore, the scar is eventually to be the result of a childhood encounter with the Olympian god Ares, while the tattoo is a tribute to his dead brother Deimos, who had similar birth markings. Other changes that occur during the Greek era of the series include the temporary addition of divine armor when Kratos is the god of war, an abdominal scar, ability-enhancing armor, such as an epaulet called the Golden Fleece—all in God of War II—and the Boots of Hermes in God of War III. According to an early God of War script, the character is 7 feet 0 inches (2.13 m) tall, but this was changed when Santa Monica Studios and Gnomon School investigated the animation-and-rigging history of the games, showing the Greek Kratos to be 2.34 metres (7 ft 8 in) tall, and Norse Kratos to be 1.94 metres (6 ft 4 in) tall and weighing about 250 pounds (110 kg). The designers of 2018's God of War gave Kratos a Nordic look that includes a full beard and changed his main weapon to a magical battle ax to make the combat more grounded. Unlike previous games, players can change and upgrade Kratos's three armor pieces, one of the game's role playing video game (RPG) elements.

Throughout the Greek games, Kratos's appearance can be altered in bonus play; completing the game at certain levels of difficulty and in challenge modes unlocks bonus costumes. Several costumes were available exclusively via pre-order and other promotions from the PlayStation Store; God of War III includes three costumes that are based on early sketches of the character. Many bonus costumes are consistent with story themes but others are humorous or farcical—such as the female costume "Athena" and the "Spud of War".

The character was named at a late stage in the development of the original game after the character had already been fleshed out. The creators were unaware of the mythical god named Kratos who appears in Prometheus Bound; they coincidentally chose Kratos from the Greek word meaning strength, of which the mythical figure is the personification. Stig Asmussen, who worked on the first two games and was the game director of God of War III, called the naming coincidence a "happy mistake", noting the games' character and the one in Prometheus Bound were both "pawns". Zoran Iovanovici of California State University, Long Beach, said while the mythical Kratos is best known for chaining Prometheus, in God of War II, the video game character releases him. Classical scholar Sylwia Chmielewski states the video game character Kratos draws extensively on other figures from Greek mythology, including the heroes Perseus, Theseus, and Achilles, but his strongest influence is the hero Heracles (Roman Hercules), who appears in God of War III with the Romanized name and is revealed to be Kratos's half-brother.

Game director Cory Barlog said for 2018's God of War, Kratos had to change his cycle of violence and learn how to control his rage. He said Kratos had made many poor decisions, which led to the destruction of Olympus, and Barlog wanted to know what would happen if Kratos made a good decision. The birth of Barlog's son influenced the idea of Kratos's character change. The canceled, live-action Star Wars television series was also an influence. The bond between Kratos and his son is at the heart of the game, and Barlog said: "This game is about Kratos teaching his son how to be a god, and his son teaching Kratos how to be human again". Referencing the Marvel Comics character Hulk, Barlog said about Kratos: "We've already told the story of The Hulk. We want to tell the story of [Bruce] Banner now." After the reveal of God of War: Laufey (2027), developers stated that Kratos will appear more in the future games.

=== Voice and actor portrayal ===
Christopher Judge, who is best known for his portrayal of Teal'c in Stargate SG-1, replaced Terrence C. Carson, who had voiced Kratos since the original God of War, as the voice of Kratos in the 2018 game. Commenting in response to the change, Carson said: "Sony went in a new direction". Barlog said due to the way the earlier games were made, the studio was able to have someone other than the voice actor perform motion capture. Although Carson performed motion capture for Kratos in Ascension, Barlog said the actor change was made because of the type of camera work they wanted to do. They needed someone who was closer to Kratos's size to perform motion capture along with 10-year-old Sunny Suljic, who played Kratos's son, Atreus. Carson was unsuitable for this because he is much shorter than Kratos, who is over six feet (1.8 m) tall: "Offsetting [Carson's height] for the size of a child, it turned out it was going to be almost impossible to try and actually shoot them and go in and redo the animations". Judge was chosen because he is six feet three inches (1.91 m) tall and had the body of a professional football player. Judge accepted the role as an opportunity to add something new to the character. He researched the character and Carson's performance but decided not to imitate Carson, instead deciding to start anew because Santa Monica was going in a new direction.

Prior to beginning work on Ragnarök, Judge briefly quit the game after finding out Eric Williams would be directing the sequel. Judge was uncertain about Williams but Barlog, who served as a producer and creative director on Ragnarök, was able to convince Judge of Williams' capability to direct the game, which Judge affirmed after working with him. Carson reprised the role in God of War Sons of Sparta (2026) for the first time since Ascension.

== Role in the God of War series ==
Kratos (left) and Deimos (right) as boys in a flashback scene from God of War: Ghost of Sparta

=== Greek era ===
==== Backstory and comics (past) ====
Throughout the series, Kratos is portrayed as an antihero, often performing questionable actions. His backstory is seen in the original God of War, Kratos's childhood is revealed in Ghost of Sparta, and the birth of his daughter is explored in the God of War comic series (2010–2011). In Ghost of Sparta, it is revealed the oracle had foretold the demise of Olympus would not happen by the hands of the Titans, who were imprisoned after the Great War, but rather by a marked mortal warrior. The Olympians Zeus, Athena, and Ares believed this warrior to be Deimos, Kratos's younger brother, due to his strange birthmark. Ares and Athena interrupted Kratos and Deimos's childhood training in Sparta and kidnapped Deimos. Kratos attempted to stop Ares, who swept him aside and scarred him across his right eye. Deimos was then taken to Death's Domain and imprisoned and tortured for many years by the god of death Thanatos. Believing Deimos to be dead, Kratos marked himself with a red tattoo identical to his brother's birthmark to honor him.

Through flashbacks in the comic book series written by Marv Wolfman (2010–11), Kratos met his wife Lysandra, with whom he had a daughter named Calliope. Upon birth, Calliope was stricken with the plague. To save his daughter, Kratos was granted a quest to find the Ambrosia of Asclepius, an elixir with magical healing properties. Five gods entered into a wager with Ares; each god chose a champion to search for the Ambrosia with Ares's champion being Kratos. Kratos overcame all obstacles, including Hades's champion, the Barbarian Prince Alrik, who eventually became the Barbarian King, and thus Kratos saved his daughter.

Via flashbacks in God of War, it is revealed Kratos became the youngest captain of Sparta's army (also shown in the 2010–11 comic series), but had a thirst for power. When Kratos was faced with total defeat by the Barbarian King and his horde, Kratos called upon Ares for aid. Kratos was given the Blades of Chaos, destroyed his enemies, and blindly followed Ares, killing hundreds in his name. During a bloody rampage, Ares tricked Kratos into murdering Lysandra and Calliope within a temple dedicated to Athena—unbeknownst to Kratos that they were in the temple. Kratos was shocked out of his bloodlust and renounced his service to Ares. As the temple burned, a village oracle cursed Kratos and condemned him to wear the "mark of his terrible deed", the ashes of his family, which turned his skin pale white, earning him the title, the "Ghost of Sparta".

==== Ascension, Chains of Olympus, and God of War (2005) ====
In Ascension, it is revealed that Kratos was imprisoned and tortured by the three Furies for renouncing and breaking his blood oath to Ares. The oath keeper Orkos helps Kratos to overcome and kill the Furies. To be completely free of Ares's oath, however, Kratos is forced to kill Orkos, who begs Kratos to do so so that he too could be free. Although free of his oath to Ares, Kratos is flooded with the memories of killing his family. He vows to serve the other gods, in hopes that they will erase his memories, and to receive forgiveness and relief from the nightmares of his past deeds, but he was openly defiant.

In Chains of Olympus, Kratos is reluctant to help the gods when Helios is kidnapped, and then openly abandoned them when Persephone offers him a chance to be reunited with Calliope. He is forced to reverse his decision when Persephone uses the Titan Atlas in a bid to destroy the world and, in turn, the spirit of Calliope. Knowing intervention would save Calliope but would separate him from his family forever, a bitter Kratos kills Persephone, imprisons Atlas, and frees Helios.

By the time of God of War (2005), Kratos has been serving the gods for 10 years, and has grown tired of his service and nightmares. He confronts his patron Athena, who advises him that the gods would forgive his sins if he killed the rampaging Ares. With this selfish motive, Kratos agrees, and after finding and using Pandora's Box, he successfully defeats Ares. Despite being freed of Ares's influence, including the Blades of Chaos, Kratos is forgiven but was not relieved of his nightmares. Dissatisfied and despairing, Kratos tries to commit suicide but is saved by Athena, who guides him to Olympus. Kratos is awarded the Blades of Athena and the throne as the new god of war.

==== Comics (2010–11), Ghost of Sparta, and Betrayal ====
The comic book series (2010–11) shows Kratos's present search for the Ambrosia of Asclepius, as he plans to destroy the Ambrosia to prevent worshipers of Ares from resurrecting their former master. Kratos overcomes several enemies, including the Chaos Giant Gyges, before destroying the Ambrosia. Still haunted by the visions of his mortal past in Ghost of Sparta, and against the advice of Athena, Kratos embarks on a quest to find his mother Callisto in the city of Atlantis. Callisto attempts to reveal the identity of Kratos's father but is transformed against her will into a beast that Kratos is forced to kill. Before dying, Callisto advises Kratos to search for his brother Deimos in Sparta. Kratos frees the Titan Thera from imprisonment, causing the destruction of Atlantis and consequently earning him the wrath of Poseidon. In Sparta, Kratos learns that Deimos is located in the Domain of Death. He finds and frees Deimos, who remained hostile toward his brother. The siblings skirmish until Thanatos attacks Deimos, who was rescued by Kratos, and the pair join forces to battle the god. At this point, Thanatos realizes Ares, Athena, and Zeus chose the wrong Spartan; it was Kratos who should have been taken, the mark being his red tattoo and his skin turned white from his family's ashes. Thanatos kills Deimos, and Kratos kills Thanatos. Kratos returns to Olympus, enraged at the gods. In Betrayal, the other gods have shunned Kratos, who decides to lead his Spartan army to overrun Greece. He is falsely accused of murdering Argos, and he subsequently kills Ceryx, the son of Hermes, for interfering in his search for Argos's true assassin, who escapes.

==== God of War II ====
Kratos's initial appearance in God of War III, and as he appeared throughout most of God of War II, wielding the Blades of Athena with the Golden Fleece on his right arm. With the exception of a few details, such as the Golden Fleece and abdominal scar, this is largely Kratos's appearance throughout the Greek era of the series.

Kratos joins the Spartan army in Rhodes, intent on destruction. Zeus weakens Kratos and tricks him into abandoning his godly powers into the Blade of Olympus, which Zeus uses to kill him. Kratos overcomes all obstacles but is stunned at Zeus's betrayal and swears revenge as he dies. Kratos falls into the Underworld but is rescued by Gaia, who was banished to Tartarus with the other surviving Titans after the First Great War. Gaia and her brethren seek Zeus's death. Kratos, fueled by anger at his betrayal, agrees to aid the Titans and is instructed to find the Sisters of Fate, who are capable of returning him to the moment of Zeus's treachery. Kratos becomes determined and utterly ruthless; in the pursuit of his goal, he wounds a Titan, kills several Greek heroes without hesitation, and sacrifices two scholars, restoring his god powers. All three of the Sisters of Fate are killed when they oppose Kratos, who is prepared to kill Zeus in a final confrontation. Zeus is saved when Athena intervenes and sacrifices herself for him; only then does Kratos show remorse. Kratos learns from a dying Athena that Zeus is his father, a fact Zeus kept secret because he wished to avoid a repetition of what he did to his own father, Cronos. Kratos rejects any notion of a relationship and vows to kill Zeus and destroy Olympus. Encouraged by Gaia, Kratos uses the power of the Fates to retrieve the Titans before their defeat in the Great War and, with their assistance, storms Mount Olympus.

==== God of War III ====
Kratos kills Poseidon but Gaia abandons him when his first encounter with Zeus goes poorly. Stranded in the Underworld, and now betrayed by both the Olympians and Titans, Kratos learns from the spirit of Athena, who also provides the Blades of Exile, he needs to find the Flame of Olympus, which is the key to defeating Zeus. In his quest for the Flame, Kratos murders Titans and gods, ignoring the warnings of his victims. Kratos realizes Pandora is the key to pacifying the Flame and reaching Pandora's Box, which is engulfed by the Flame. Kratos comes to care for Pandora, who reminds him of his lost daughter Calliope. Kratos shows humanity when he attempts to stop Pandora from sacrificing herself to quench the Flame but reluctantly allows the act when she says there is no other option. Zeus provokes Pandora into sacrificing herself after he states Kratos would fail her like he failed his own family, causing Kratos to release Pandora and attack Zeus in a rage. Kratos finds Pandora's Box empty, and is driven berserk by Zeus's mockery. Kratos engages Zeus in another fierce battle. Gaia interrupts and tries to kill Kratos and Zeus. Kratos destroys Gaia and then apparently defeats Zeus. Zeus returns in spirit form and attacks Kratos, who retreats into his psyche and forgives himself for his past sins with the help of Pandora. Pandora appears and tells Kratos hope would save him. Kratos is revived and easily destroys Zeus. Athena confronts Kratos and demands he return the power of hope, the contents of Pandora's Box. In a selfless act, Kratos refuses, stating his need for vengeance is gone and impales himself with the Blade of Olympus, which disperses the power across the world for mankind's use. Athena, disappointed with Kratos, removes the Blade and departs as Kratos collapses next to the Blade of Olympus. The post-credits scene shows a trail of blood leading away from the Blade with Kratos's whereabouts unknown.

=== Norse era ===
==== God of War (2018) ====
Decades after the events of God of War III, Kratos, having survived his apparent death from releasing the power of hope in Greece, arrives in ancient Scandinavia in the Norse realm of Midgard, and fathers a boy named Atreus, who is unaware of his true nature. Kratos has abandoned his double-chained blades as a symbol of the abandonment his old persona; instead, he uses a battle ax called the Leviathan Axe, which originally belonged to his second wife and Atreus's mother, Laufey (called Faye by Kratos), who recently died. Faye's last wish was for her ashes to be spread at the highest peak of the nine realms. At Midgard's peak, they learn from Mímir the highest peak is in Jötunheim. During their journey, the Æsir god Baldur, the brother of Thor, confronts them. Thor's sons Modi and Magni help Baldur but are killed by Kratos and Atreus. Around this time, Atreus falls ill; to cure him, Kratos must recover his old weapons, the Blades of Chaos, to battle the beings of Helheim because the Leviathan Axe, which inflicts frost damage, is useless there. While retrieving the blades, Athena appears and goads him about his past. Kratos travels to Hel, killing the troll that guards the realm, and retrieves the cure. After curing him, Kratos reveals to Atreus he is a god. The pair receives assistance from a witch, who is later revealed to be the Vanir goddess Freya, Baldur's mother, who cast a spell of immortality on him; the spell protects Baldur but causes him to no longer physically feel anything, for which he resents Freya.

Kratos and Baldur eventually battle, during which Baldur's spell is broken. Kratos decides to let Baldur go but Baldur attempts to kill Freya, forcing Kratos to kill him. Freya swears revenge against Kratos for killing her son and taunts Kratos for not revealing his troubled past to Atreus. Kratos decides to tell Atreus he had killed his fellow Greek gods, including his father Zeus—whose illusion he saw in Helheim—but that he and Atreus should learn from these experiences and not repeat past mistakes. Kratos and Atreus travel to Jötunheim, where it is learned Faye was a giant, making Atreus part-giant. It is also revealed Faye originally wanted to name their son Loki but Kratos preferred Atreus, which was the name of an honorable Spartan comrade. The giants also referred to Kratos as Fárbauti. In Midgard, Fimbulwinter begins and, after sleeping in the family home, Atreus has a vision Thor will come for them at the end of Fimbulwinter.

==== Ragnarök and Valhalla ====
Three years after the events of the previous game, the All-father Odin and the god of thunder Thor confront Kratos, Atreus, and Mímir. Kratos duels Thor after which, Kratos, Atreus, and Mímir travel across the nine realms in hopes of finding a way to prevent Ragnarök. Along the way, a vengeful Freya confronts them but they eventually make amends. Unable to prevent Ragnarök, Kratos, Atreus, and their allies unite the realms in a war against Asgard. Kratos again battles Thor, who is killed by Odin for refusing to kill Kratos. Kratos, Atreus, Mímir, and Freya then engage Odin in battle and defeat him as Asgard is destroyed. Returning home to Midgard, Atreus, as Loki, decides he needs to find any remaining giants and bids farewell while Kratos learns he is destined to become a revered god. Along with Freya and Mímir, Kratos begins rebuilding the realms and restoring peace.

In Ragnarök's downloadable content (DLC) pack Valhalla, it is revealed that Freya, now the Queen of the Realms, offered Kratos to join her council as the new Norse god of war, as Týr abandoned the position, but Kratos was reluctant due to his abuse of power on the Greek pantheon. Kratos and Mímir receive an anonymous invitation to Valhalla, which is later revealed to be from Týr so that Kratos can confront his past and forgive himself. Kratos goes through several trials in Valhalla and eventually makes amends with his past self and accepts the seat as the Norse god of war, championing the ideals of hope.

== Other appearances ==
=== Video games outside the God of War franchise ===
The Greek and Norse versions of Kratos have appeared as playable characters and costumes in several PlayStation games outside the God of War series. On August 21, 2008, the Greek Kratos, along with his Clubs of Chaos, was released as a downloadable character in Hot Shots Golf: Out of Bounds. As a pre-order bonus for LittleBigPlanet from GameStop, customers received a Sackboy Kratos costume along with ones for Medusa and a Minotaur, as well as a God of War level sticker kit. These were later released for purchase on January 26, 2009. Kratos was also a guest character in 2009's Soulcalibur: Broken Destiny.

As a pre-order bonus for ModNation Racers from GameStop, customers received a Kratos Mod and his Kart of Chaos. These were released for purchase on November 2, 2010. Kratos's next guest appearance was in the PlayStation 3 version of 2011's Mortal Kombat—as well as the PlayStation Vita version released in 2012—which features his own fighting stage and arcade ladder mode. Kratos then appeared in the 2012 crossover fighting game PlayStation All-Stars Battle Royale, which includes two God of War-inspired stages, several God of War items, and series antagonist Zeus, who was released as a downloadable character on March 19, 2013. Kratos's appearance in PlayStation All-Stars Battle Royale was seemingly made canon by a line of dialogue in 2022's God of War Ragnarök; Mímir asks Kratos about a tournament he was in to which Kratos replies he did not want to talk about it.

As part of the God of War franchise's 10th anniversary, Kratos appeared as a secret boss battle in the PlayStation 3, PlayStation 4, and PlayStation Vita versions of Shovel Knight, which released on April 21, 2015. His next guest appearance was in LittleBigPlanet 3 as another Sackboy costume in his Fear Kratos form, along with Sackboy costumes of Zeus, Hercules, Poseidon, and Athena, and a costume of Hades for the character Toggle. This coincided with the release of God of War III Remastered on PlayStation 4 in July 2015. A costume of Kratos and God of War custom decorations were included in the "Crafted Edition" of Tearaway Unfolded, which was released for PlayStation 4 on September 8, 2015. TC Carson provided the Greek Kratos's voice in these guest appearances, except for LittleBigPlanet, ModNation Racers, LittleBigPlanet 3, and Tearaway Unfolded, where the character is only a costume, and in Shovel Knight, which only has text dialogue.

In the PlayStation 5 launch game Astro's Playroom (2020), which contains several homages to PlayStation's history, two robots dressed as the Nordic Kratos and his son Atreus are seen re-enacting the scene in God of War (2018) in which the two travel in their boat. Kratos would also be referenced in the Astro's Playroom sequel, Astro Bot (2024). The Nordic Kratos became a cosmetic outfit in Fortnite Battle Royale's chapter two, season five event, Zero Point, which was released on December 3, 2020. Kratos is playable on all platforms on which Fortnite is available, marking the character's only appearance on the Xbox and Nintendo platforms, as well as Apple and Android devices; these platforms, including Windows, have Kratos's default appearance while players on the PlayStation versions get an exclusive armored Kratos that is based on the golden armor obtained from defeating the Valkyries in God of War (2018). An armor inspired by Kratos's Nordic appearance is obtainable in the Director's Cut of Ghost of Tsushima, which was released on August 20, 2021, for the PlayStation 4 and PlayStation 5.

Costumes of the Nordic Kratos, Atreus, and Freya, and emotes for each, were released for Sackboy: A Big Adventure in the world of LittleBigPlanet on November 9, 2022, the same day as God of War Ragnarök's release. An armor set inspired by the Nordic Kratos was added to Destiny 2 as part of its Lightfall – Season of the Deep release on May 23, 2023. The set is for the Titan character class and is purchasable on all platforms Destiny 2 is available on: PS4, PS5, Xbox One, Xbox Series X/S, and Windows. It features Kratos's red tattoo and breechcloth, and is light gray. A special finishing maneuver that mimics the Blades of Chaos was also added.

The Greek Kratos was also parodied in The Simpsons franchise. He appears as the "God of Wharf" on a billboard advertising a chowder restaurant in The Simpsons Game.

=== Film and television ===
A live-action film adaptation of the original God of War game was announced in 2005. During pre-production, new writers were hired to adapt the game, but the project remained in development hell. Following the release of 2018's God of War, rumors about a potential adaptation of that game began circulating. In May 2021, however, a Sony spokesperson said there was no film adaptation for any God of War game in development. The following May, it was instead announced that a streaming television series adaptation of the Norse era, starting with the events of the 2018 installment, was being developed for Amazon Prime Video. Ryan Hurst, who played Thor in Ragnarök, was originally cast in the role of Kratos, however, while filming a stunt in late June 2026, he tore his bicep, which required surgery. Due to the estimated time of recovery, Dave Bautista was cast to replace Hurst in the role.

A parody of the Greek Kratos appears on the Guts of War II: Entrails of Intestinox kiosk at E4, itself a parody of the Electronic Entertainment Expo (E3), in The Simpsons television episode "The Food Wife". The Greek Kratos has also been parodied by Adult Swim's clay-mation television series Robot Chicken. He was first parodied in season 5, episode 15, "The Core, The Thief, His Wife and Her Lover", which shows how far Kratos (voiced by Brian Austin Green) will go to collect blood orbs. Sony later worked with Robot Chicken to produce an advertisement for PlayStation All-Stars Battle Royale that parodies Kratos and other characters from the game.

The Nordic Kratos, voiced by Judge, also had a cameo in Amazon Prime Video's anthology series Secret Level. He appeared in the first season's finale, which released on December 17, 2024.

=== Novels ===
Kratos is the main character in novelizations of the video game series. Matthew Stover, Robert E. Vardeman, and James M. Barlog wrote novels retelling the games' events and further exploring their stories. Together, Stover and Vardeman wrote the first novel, which is titled God of War and was published in May 2010. Vardeman alone wrote the second novel God of War II, which was published in February 2013. The third novel, God of War – The Official Novelization, was written by Barlog and published in August 2018; this is a novelization of 2018's God of War, skipping a novelization of God of War III.

== Cultural impact ==
=== Reception ===
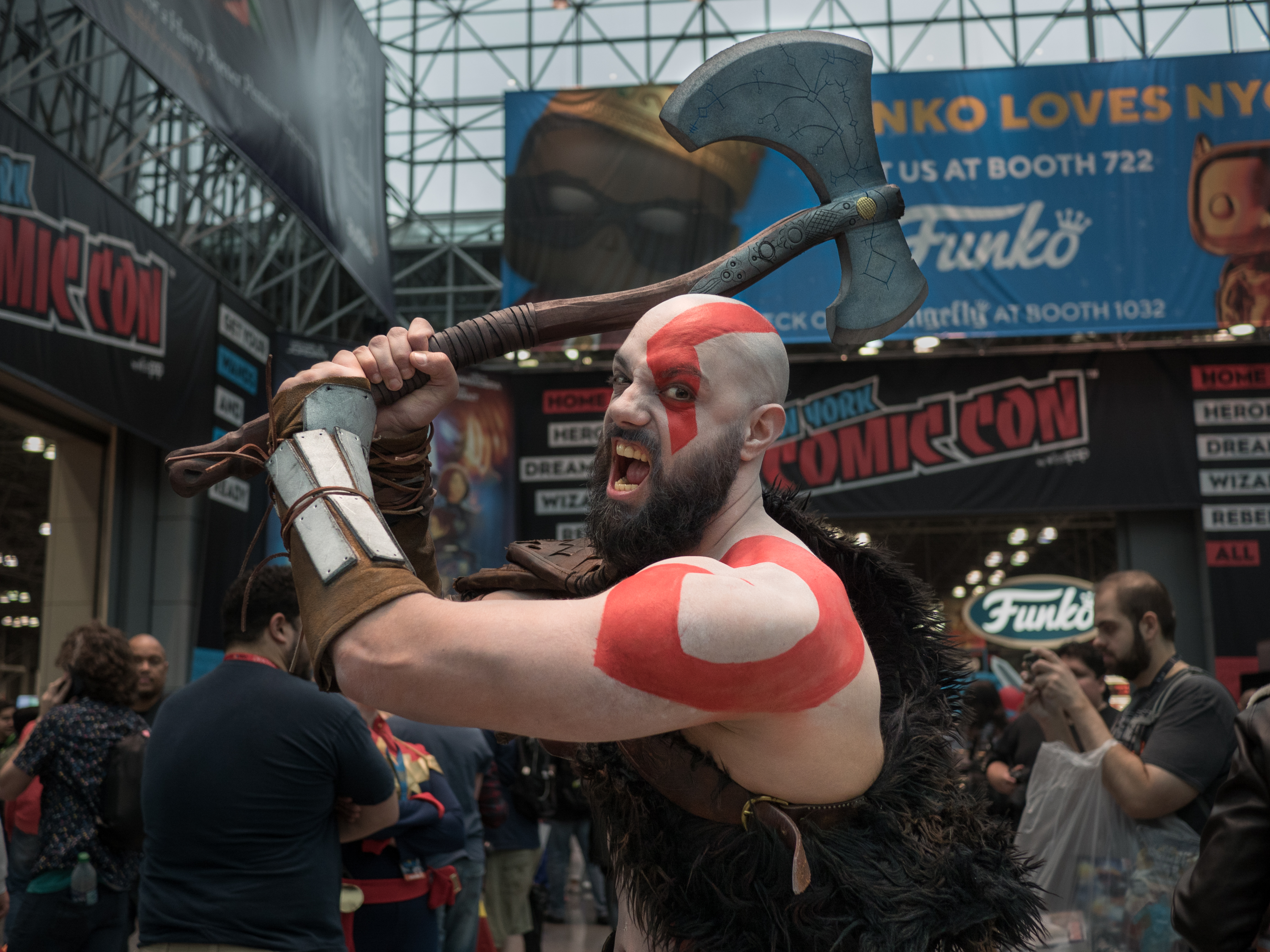
Nordic Kratos cosplay at the 2018 New York Comic Con

Video game publications have given Kratos a positive reception. Magazines, including Guinness World Records Gamer's Edition, described him as one of the greatest and most iconic video game characters. Alex Navarro of GameSpot regarded the Greek Kratos as a "sympathetic antihero" and a "badass", describing him as endearing due to his unforgiving demeanor, but added the slowly-developing story offered players "no understanding [of Kratos]" in the original game's early stages. GamesRadar+ included Kratos as one of the 25 best new characters of the decade, stating while he appeared at first to be a generic character, players eventually learn Kratos is both an "unstoppable force of nature" and a "broken, tragic man".

Knowing of the talks about a God of War film at the time, both Jesse Schedeen of IGN and Marissa Melisa of UGO Networks described Kratos as a character who deserved his own movie. In 2012, Justin Amirkhani of Complex said Kratos had the best fighting game cameos for his guest appearances in Soulcalibur: Broken Destiny and Mortal Kombat, while in 2023, Drea Avellan called him one of the "most badass" video game characters of all time. Kratos's Blades of Chaos were also cited by Lance Cartelli of GameSpot as one of "the most badass swords in video game history". Ivan Sulic of IGN said Kratos was ruthless, merciless, and savage, noting his main motive in the Greek games was vengeance and that "all he desires is murder". Sulic also stated "in time", the player would begin to "love and loathe Kratos and hate Ares". Patrick Shaw of GamePro said it was "Kratos' tragic fall and brutal ascension to the peaks of Mount Olympus that made the original God of War so memorable". GamesRadar+ staff described Kratos as "one of PlayStation's most popular representatives", and described him as the "most memorable, influential, and badass" protagonist in games, writing: "Being insanely violent isn't exactly an uncommon trait amongst game characters, but driven by a rage wrought from his guilt (slaughtered thousands, including—oops—his wife and daughter) Kratos kills with such convincing visceral aggression it elevates him way beyond the status of brain-dead murder-bot".

Critics have acclaimed Kratos's portrayal in 2018's God of War, with many complimenting his more-layered and relatable personality compared to previous versions. Dave Thier of Forbes wrote: "Kratos is a character this time", calling him "fleshed-out" and "surprisingly engaging", while Jonathon Dornbush of IGN said the game "transforms him from the previous games' flat embodiment of the bloodthirsty warrior cliché into someone who can stand shoulder to shoulder with some of my favorite protagonists in recent media". Similarly, Stephen Farrelly of Red Bull stated: "This God of War reflects a new, more nuanced Kratos in that it's measured, deep and ... complex". According to Mike Hume of The Washington Post, Kratos "taught him as a father". Hume said even if the teachings are occasionally challenging, Kratos takes it upon himself to teach Atreus because he is aware of the difficulties in the world. Kratos is aware of the risks his son will encounter on their travels. Hume added Kratos and Atreus strike a balance in their love and connection. Atreus improves himself as a result of paying attention to his father's advice. Kratos develops compassion as he begins to see the world more like his son does.

Nathan Ingraham of Engadget, though saying it was an exaggeration, wrote: "Kratos is more nuanced and shows more emotion in the game's opening hour than he did in the entire previous trilogy". Nick Plessas of Electronic Gaming Monthly said the story's most-memorable moments were the interactions between Kratos and Atreus. He also noted: "There is often some comic relief to be found when Kratos' curtness and Atreus' charming naivety collide". Briana Lawrence of The Mary Sue said Kratos and Atreus's father-son adventure reminded them that they were not alone, while Jakejames Lugo of Red Bull said the father-son-duo shared a remarkable relationship and made for a stunning virtual photography subject. Kratos was cited as one of the best video game characters of the 2010s by Polygon writer Colin Campbell, particularly his appearance, and wrote: "In 2018's God of War, [Kratos] retains his skills as a warrior, but is now a father whose gruff, tough-love approach to parenting belies a touching capacity for love and tenderness toward his son, and a deep grief for his late wife".

Kratos has also been criticized, predominantly for his portrayal in the Greek era of the series. Prince of Persia producer Ben Mattes said he considered Kratos "a supercool character, but it's black and white; his personality is pure rage, his dialogue is pure rage, his character design is pure rage—it's kind of easy". Jeremy "Norm" Scott, creator of the comic strip Hsu and Chan, stated in Electronic Gaming Monthly Kratos was average and "did not exist, except as an avatar for the player". Jesse Schedeen of IGN described Kratos as the sixth-most-overrated video game character and said: "Kratos is the typical testosterone-fueled He-Man that modern entertainment has too much of". Dante Douglas of Paste referred to power fantasy as the "Muscle-Bound Warrior Man" and said it was the commonest way men are sexualized in video games. According to Douglas, one well-known example was Kratos, whom he also cited as being characterized by hypermasculinity. He also said one of the primary distinctions between the sexualization of female characters and Kratos, and other instances of "power fantasy", was their agency. Rather than being intended for sexual stimulation, the male character's sexual activities served as avatars for straight male gamers to demonstrate their might through conquest. Jaffe expressed distaste for the direction of Kratos's character development in the Norse era games, saying experiences reflective of ageing developers were ill-fitting for the character.

During the God of War Laufey reveal, Kenneth Shepard of Kotaku described Kratos as a wife guy. Meanwhile, Ash Parrish hoped that Kratos won't appear in the game. The character was also subject to internet memes.

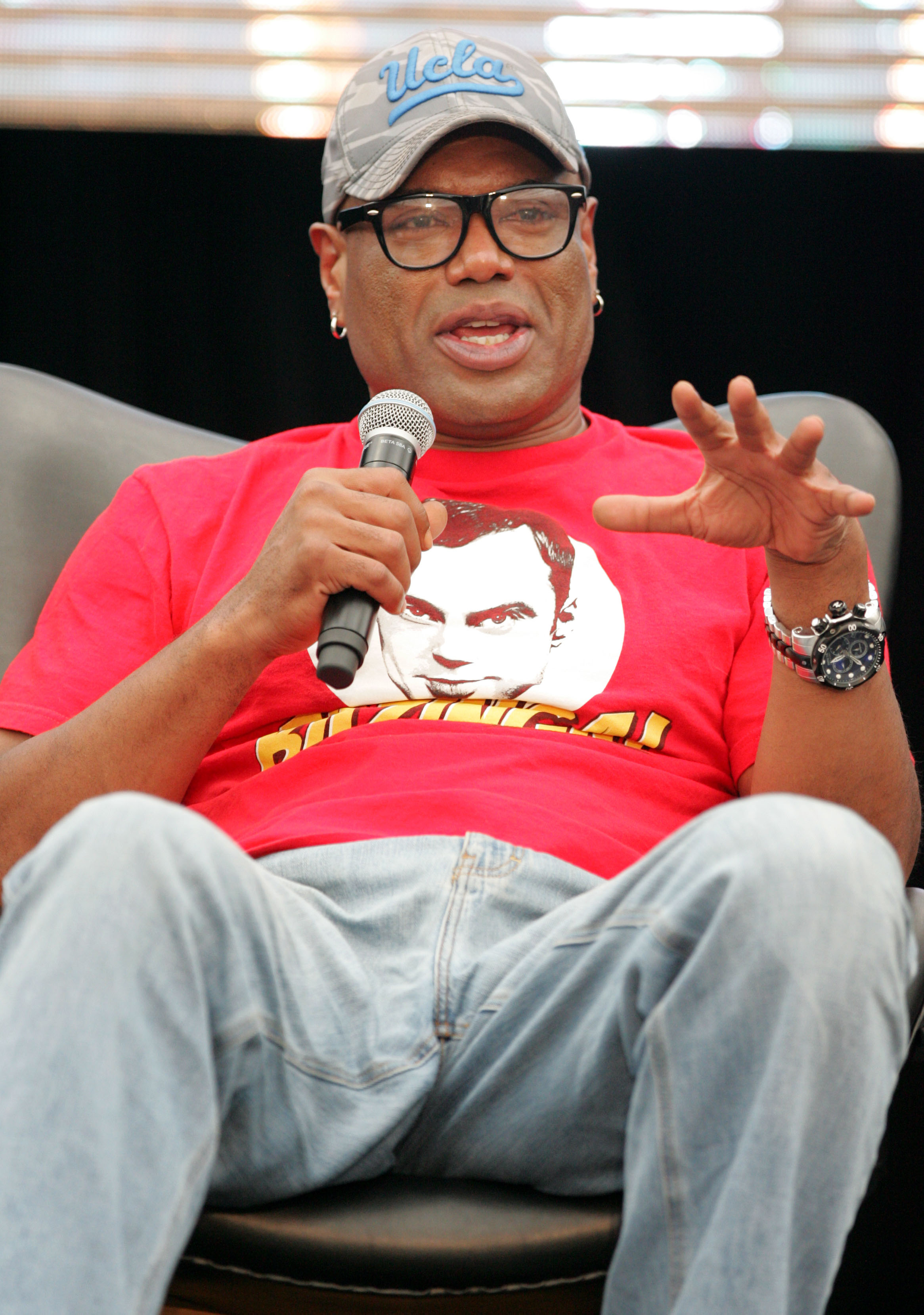
Christopher Judge's performance as Kratos in 2018's God of War and its 2022 sequel Ragnarök was met with acclaim.

During the 9th Annual Interactive Achievement Awards, Terrence C. Carson's portrayal of Kratos in the original God of War was awarded with Outstanding Character Performance – Male by the Academy of Interactive Arts & Sciences; a few years later, Carson's performance in God of War III received a nomination for Outstanding Character Performance during the 14th Annual Interactive Achievement Awards. At the 2010 Spike Video Game Awards, Kratos was nominated for "Character of the Year" and awarded "Biggest Badass". GameSpot included Kratos in its "All Time Greatest Video Game Hero" contest, in which the character reached the "Elite Eight" round before losing to Mario.

The portrayal of Kratos in God of War (2018) was received favorably by the industry, with the character's new voice actor Christopher Judge earning a BAFTA Award for Performer at the 15th British Academy Games Awards. He was also nominated for Best Performance at The Game Awards 2018. While he did not win the award in 2018, Judge won Best Performance for his performance as Kratos in God of War Ragnarök at The Game Awards 2022. For both God of War (2018) and Ragnarök, Judge's portrayal won him and the creative team the Outstanding Achievement in Character awards from the Academy of Interactive Arts & Sciences. In 2024, a poll conducted by the British Academy of Film and Television Arts (BAFTA) with around 4,000 respondents named Kratos as the ninth-most-iconic video-game character of all time.

=== Merchandise and promotion ===
The National Entertainment Collectibles Association (NECA) produced two series of action figures based on God of War II. The first set included two versions of Kratos; one wielding the Blades of Athena, and the other wearing the Golden Fleece and holding a Gorgon's head. The second set included a twelve in (30 cm) figure that played six game quotes. A second two-figure set was released, with Kratos wearing the God of War armor. In October 2009, United Cutlery created a scaled replica of Kratos's Blades of Chaos that included a custom display stand with the God of War logo.

Kratos was featured in a line of action figures DC Unlimited released and based on God of War III; this line included the characters Zeus, Hades, and Hercules. Between February 1, 2010, and March 31, 2010, the convenience store chain 7-Eleven sold a limited-edition Slurpee drink called "Kratos Fury" and four exclusive God of War III cups bearing codes that could be used to access God of War III and Slurpee-themed downloadable content on the Slurpee website. The video game website X-Play filmed a parody music video of Robin Thicke's "Sex Therapy", in which Jessica Blake played Aphrodite.

Kratos's visage has appeared on the PlayStation Portable exclusive bundle pack Chains of Olympus, and on the PlayStation 3 God of War III sweepstakes prize video game consoles. A limited-edition, ten-inch (25 cm) figurine of Kratos was the grand prize of a sweepstakes in a promotion for God of War Collection in November 2009. A six-inch (150 mm) figure of Kratos was included in the God of War: Ascension—Collector's Edition. In June 2014, a Kratos Pop! Vinyl Figure was released.

The same year, Sony partnered with Gaming Heads to produce a limited-edition (500 units), life-size bust of Kratos. It is 28 inches (71 cm) tall and sits upon a Greek-inspired column. One hundred units of a "Fear Kratos" version of the bust that was based on the Fear Kratos costume from God of War III were also produced that year. In 2015, Sony again partnered with Gaming Heads to produce a limited-edition (1,250 units), lunging Kratos statue that is 19 inches (48 cm) tall and depicts Kratos wielding the Blades of Exile. For the God of War franchise's 10th anniversary in March 2015, Gaming Heads produced two limited-edition "Kratos on the Throne" statues, depicting the final scene of the original God of War game. Both statues are 29 inches (74 cm) tall; the Regular Edition (1,250 units) depicts Kratos in his normal attire and the Exclusive Edition (500 units) depicts Kratos in his God of War armor. In November 2015, Sony announced it would release a new Kratos statue the following month to celebrate God of War's 10-year anniversary. Santa Monica designed the limited edition (500 units), polystone statue, which is over 26 inches (66 cm) tall and includes leather, cloth, and metal pieces. In 2023, a rubber duck depicting Kratos was made.

== See also ==
- Kratos (mythology)
- Fárbauti
- Characters of God of War
