= Oenus (city) =

Oenus or Oinous (Ancient Greek: Οἰνοῦς; Eth. Οἰνούντιος) was a town in ancient Laconia, Greece, celebrated for its wine, from which the river Oenus, a tributary of the Eurotas, appears to have derived its name. From its being described by Athenaeus as near Pitane, one of the divisions of ancient Sparta, it was probably situated near the junction of the Oenus and the Eurotas.

Its site is unlocated.
