= Andy Park (artist) =

Korean-American artist (born 1975)

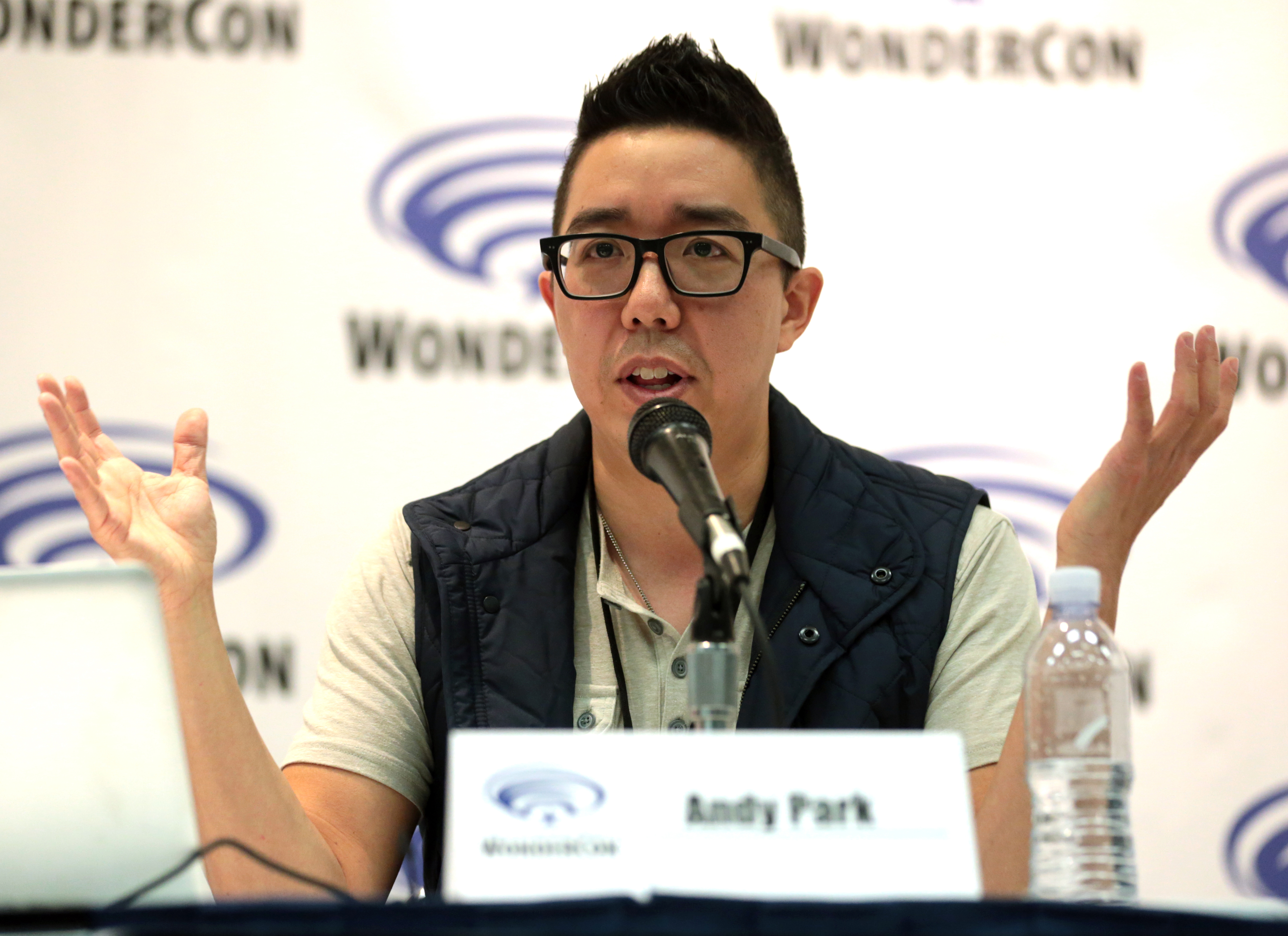
- Park at WonderCon 2017
- Born: July 3, 1975 (age 51)
- Area: Artist

Andy Park (born July 3, 1975) is a Korean-American comic book artist, illustrator, and concept artist.

== Career ==
Andy Park started his professional career as a comic book artist at Extreme Studios, a division of Image Comics. He penciled both interior work as well as cover work for several titles, most notably, "Avengelyne" and Glory/Angela: Angels in Hell. Park took a hiatus from comic books to study Illustration at Art Center College of Design. In 1999, he returned to comic books to illustrate the new "Tomb Raider" comic book series written by Dan Jurgens and published by Top Cow Productions and was noted as one of the top 10 artists in the industry by Wizard Magazine. Tomb Raider #1 was the highest selling comic book of 1999. After issue #20 Andy began working at Marvel Comics as a cover artist and interior artist on titles such as Excalibur, "Weapon X", "New X-Men", Mutopia X, and "Uncanny X-Men".

Marketing illustration (Game Informer cover) done for God of War III PlayStation video game

Besides comic book work, Andy has also contributed interior as well as cover illustrations to several magazines including Maxim, Flex, PSM, Wizard, "Muscle & Fitness", "2D Artist Magazine", "Advanced Photoshop", "Imagine FX", "Game Informer", and many others. He has also illustrated covers for various other comic book companies including DC Comics such as Superman Confidential, WildCats, The Authority, and God of War.

In 2005, Andy started working as a concept artist for Santa Monica Studio, a division of Sony Computer Entertainment. He designed characters, creatures, props, and environments for the award-winning video games, God of War II, God of War: Chains of Olympus, StarHawk, and God of War III. Andy was one of the lead concept artists for Sony designing many of the main characters, bosses, and environments for the game including among others Poseidon, Poseidon Leviathan, Hermes, Chimera, Saytr, Centaur, Skorpius, Fear Zeus, Minotaur, Athena's astral form, Olympus Sentries, Olympus Archer, Olympus Legionnaire, Olympus Guardian, Hera, Persephone, Talos, Blade of Olympus, Hades Palace Arena, Mt. Olympus interior environment, and Hades Wall Run environment. His artwork was also heavily used throughout Sony's marketing campaign to promote the highly anticipated release of the hit PlayStation 3 video game, God of War III. He illustrated the covers to several magazines to promote the game including "Game Informer" and "PlayStation Official Magazine." GameStop had a pre-order incentive of a 17X24 poster of Kratos signed by Andy Park. He also illustrated the cover to the European release of the God of War Trilogy, coinciding with the release of the third game. He was featured in several print and video interviews to help promote the game.

In 2010, Andy joined the Visual Development team at Marvel Studios to help develop the look and feel of its movies designing characters, costumes, and key frames for its cinematic universe. Most notably, he has worked on The Avengers, which has broken a slew of box-office records and has become the 3rd highest-grossing movie of all time. He has also worked on the films Captain America: The First Avenger, Thor, Iron Man 3, Captain America: The Winter Soldier, Thor: The Dark World, Guardians of the Galaxy, Avengers: Age of Ultron, Ant-Man, Captain America: Civil War, and Doctor Strange. He was promoted to Visual Development Supervisor in 2015 and has led the Visual Development team on the films Guardians of the Galaxy Vol. 2, Thor: Ragnarok, Ant-Man and the Wasp, and Captain Marvel. He was laid off from the company in April 2026.

Andy is a member of the IATSE Art Directors Guild.

== Bibliography ==
=== Comic book interiors ===
- Avengelyne #0, 1/2, 4-5 (1996)
- Avengelyne Bible #1 (1996)
- Avengelyne: Armageddon #0 (1996)
- Avengeblade #1-2 (1996)
- Devlin #1 (1996)
- Extreme Destroyer Epilogue (1996)
- Glory/Angela: Angels in Hell #1 (1996)
- Xavier Institute Alumni Yearbook #1 (1996)
- X-Force/Youngblood #1 (1996)
- UltraForce #15 (1996)
- Ascension #13(1997)
- Archangels: The Saga #6 (1998)
- Lady Pendragon #0 (1998)
- Fathom Swimsuit Special (1999)
- Blood Legacy: The Story of Ryan #1 (1999)
- Witchblade Gallery #1 (2000)
- Tomb Raider #1-10, 13–14, 16-20 (1999–2002)
- Tomb Raider Cover Gallery #1 (2006)
- The Tomb Raider Gallery #1 (2000)
- Tomb Raider Magazine #1 (2001)
- Tomb Raider: Tankōbon TRP vol. 01-02 (2006)
- Tomb Raider: The Official Magazine #1-4 (2001)
- Top Cow Classics in Black and White: Tomb Raider #1 (2000)
- Uncanny X-Men #452-454 (2005)
- Official Handbook of the Marvel Universe A to Z HC vol. 05 (2008)

=== Comic book covers ===
- Vogue #1 (1995)
- Maximage #4 (1995)
- Avengelyne #1/2, 1, 4-5 (1996)
- Avengelyne/Glory: Swimsuit #1 (1996)
- Devlin #1 (1996)
- Glory/Angela: Angels in Hell #1 (1996)
- Archangels: The Saga #6 (1998)
- Fathom (comics)|Fathom #4 (1998)
- Previews Magazine #132 (1999)
- Tomb Raider #1/2, FCBD, Preview Edition, TPB vol. 01–02, 1–10, 13–20, 24-25 (1999–2002)
- Tomb Raider Gallery #1 (2000)
- Tomb Raider: Journeys #1-2 (2001)
- Tomb Raider: Tankobon TPB vol. 01-02 (2006)
- Tomb Raider: The Official Magazine #1 (2001)
- Tomb Raider Classics in Black and White: Tomb Raider #1 (2000)
- Wizard Magazine #101 (2000)
- Objective Five #5 (2000)
- Tenth Muse #6 (2000)
- Tenth Muse #1 (2002)
- Tenth Muse novel (2005)
- Black Tide #1 (2001)
- Glory: Alan Moore's Glory #0, 1-2 (2001)
- The Coven: Dark Siste # (2001)
- Lady Pendragon # (1999)
- Lady Pendragon- Volume One- Remastered # (1999)
- Blood Legacy # (1999)
- Violent Messiahs # (2000)
- The Coven: Dark Sister #1 (2001)
- Demonslayer: Vengeance #1 (2001)
- Weapon X #23-28 (2002)
- Youngblood: Bloodsport #1 (2003)
- New X-Men #5 (2004)
- Excalibur #1-7, TPB vol. 01-02 (2004)
- Mutopia X #1-5 (2005)
- Fathom: Kiani #3 (2007)
- Superman Confidential #7 (2007)
- The Authority #27 (2008)
- WildCats #28 (2008)
- God of War #1-6, TPB #1 (2010-2011)
- Tomb Raider (Dark Horse series) #1, 9, 10, 15, 16, TPB vol. 2 (2014-2015)
- Lara Croft and the Frozen Omen (2015)
- Tomb Raider Archives Volume 1 (2016)

=== Video games ===
- Dungeons & Dragons: Dragonshard (2005) (concept artist)
- God of War II (2007) (concept artist)
- God of War: Chains of Olympus (2008) (concept artist)
- God of War Collection (2009) (concept artist)
- God of War III (2010) (concept artist)
- Starhawk (2012) (concept artist)
- God of War: Ascension (2013) (concept artist)

=== Filmography ===
- Captain America: The First Avenger (2011) (concept artist)
- Thor (2011) (concept artist)
- The Avengers (2012) (concept artist)
- Iron Man 3 (2013) (concept artist)
- Thor: The Dark World (2013) (concept artist)
- Captain America: The Winter Soldier (2014) (concept artist)
- Guardians of the Galaxy (2014) (concept artist)
- Avengers: Age of Ultron (2015) (concept artist)
- Ant-Man (2015) (concept artist)
- Captain America: Civil War (2016) (lead concept art)
- Doctor Strange (2016) (concept artist)
- Guardians of the Galaxy Vol. 2 (2017) (visual development supervisor)
- Thor: Ragnarok (2017) (visual development supervisor)
- Black Panther (2018) (visual development supervisor)
- Avengers: Infinity War (2018) (concept artist)
- Ant-Man and the Wasp (2018) (visual development supervisor)
- Captain Marvel (2019) (visual development supervisor)
- Avengers: Endgame (2018) (concept artist)
- WandaVision (2021) (2021) (visual development supervisor)
- Black Widow (2021) (visual development supervisor)
- Shang-Chi and the Legend of the Ten Rings (2021) (visual development supervisor)
- Hawkeye (2021) (concept artist)
- Doctor Strange in the Multiverse of Madness (2022) (concept artist)
- Thor: Love and Thunder (2022) (visual development supervisor)
- Ant-Man and the Wasp: Quantumania (2023) (visual development supervisor)
- Guardians of the Galaxy Vol. 3 (2023) (visual development supervisor)
- The Marvels (2023) (visual development supervisor)
- Deadpool & Wolverine (2024) (visual development supervisor)

=== Other work ===
His artwork has been showcased in other publications such as Spectrum: The Best in Contemporary Fantastic Art, the Art of God of War 3, Edge Presents: The Art of Video Games, Exotique 3, Elemental 3, The Art of Captain America: The First Avenger, and The Art of Marvel's The Avengers.
