= God of War (DC Comics) =

Comic book limited series

- Cover of God of War #1 (March 2010). Artist Andy Park.

Publication information
- Publisher: WildStorm (#1–5); DC Comics (#6)
- Schedule: Bi-monthly
- Format: Limited series
- Genre: Action/Adventure
- Publication date: March 2010 – January 2011
- No. of issues: 6
- Main character: Kratos

Creative team
- Written by: Marv Wolfman
- Artist(s): Andrea Sorrentino; Andy Park (cover arts)
- Letterer: Saida Temofonte
- Editor(s): Ben Abernathy; Kristy Quinn (assistant)

Collected editions
- God of War: ISBN 1-4012-2972-7

God of War is a six-issue American comic book limited series set in the Greek mythology era of the God of War universe. The series was written by Marv Wolfman, illustrated by Andrea Sorrentino, and the cover art for each issue was produced by Andy Park, who was also an artist for the video game series. The first five issues were published by WildStorm, with the final issue published by parent company DC Comics due to WildStorm's closure in December 2010. The series' launch coincided with the release of the video game God of War III in March 2010. The final issue was published in January 2011, followed by a trade paperback that March.

The limited series follows the story of Kratos, the main protagonist of the video game series. The majority is told in flashback and shows a past quest for the Ambrosia of Asclepius, and also relates the story of Kratos's present search for the same object. The two narratives are told simultaneously; Kratos first attempts to save his dying daughter, Calliope, and years later, he is seeking to destroy the Ambrosia to prevent the resurrection of the former God of War, Ares.

The series received mixed reviews. Some critics praised Wolfman's writing, while others said that although the setting was a good comic book incentive and a good prequel for the video game series, the story did not make sense. Sorrentino's interior artwork was criticized for being "muddy", while others praised it for being distinctive and that it did well at setting the tone and atmosphere.

== Publication history ==
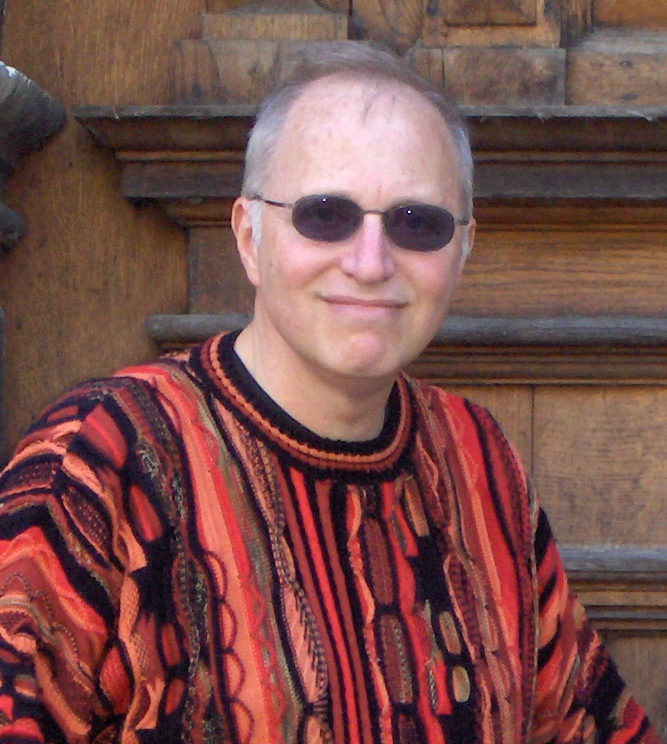
God of War comic series writer Marv Wolfman in 2007

A limited six-issue comic book series based on the God of War video game series was announced at the 2009 Comic-Con International. It was scheduled to debut in October 2009, but its launch was delayed to coincide with that of the video game God of War III in March 2010. Scott A. Steinberg, Vice President of Product Marketing at Sony Computer Entertainment America said, "we are thrilled to work with the world's largest comic book publisher to bring one of our most beloved PlayStation franchises...to comic book fans". In an interview with IGN, writer Marv Wolfman stated that when he heard rumor of the comic series, he showed immediate interest and pushed hard to be chosen as the writer because God of War was one of his favorite video games. Wolfman said that he had already played the first two games, so there was no research to be done, but he did receive copies of the scripts for all the games to ensure his work was as accurate as possible. He also stated that he worked very closely with Santa Monica Studio—the main developer of the video games—and tied the comic book's narrative directly to the story they created for the games. Wolfman said that Santa Monica ensured the mythology was consistent while revealing new facts about the main character Kratos's past.

In an interview with Comic Book Resources, Wolfman stated that Santa Monica suggested the use of two time periods, with past events affecting the narrative present. He introduced new characters, including Kratos's first wife—who briefly appeared in the games but was never named. He stated the final script was a combination of his ideas and Santa Monica's character-appropriate dialog. Series artist Andrea Sorrentino stated, "it was clear from the start that for this project Sony and DC [Comics] wanted something a bit different from a 'classical' comic. So I just took my usual style and added to it something new, like new colors from the videogame palette". She stated that the games had strong, epic images, and that she easily adapted her style to Wolfman's writing as he "did really good work showing both dramatic and epic scenes". Sorrentino used color to give importance to each scene, adding hot colors (red, orange, or brown) in action scenes and cold ones (green or light blue) in others so that readers could immediately have an emotional reaction.

The series was published on a bi-monthly schedule between March 2010 and January 2011. The first five issues were published by WildStorm, with the final issue published by parent company DC Comics due to WildStorm's closure in December 2010. In March 2011, the series was collected into a trade paperback.

== Synopsis ==
=== Setting ===
The comic book series takes place within the Greek mythology era of the video game series and is set in an alternate version of Ancient Greece, populated by the Olympian gods and other mythological beings. The story is split between two chapters in the video game chronology; a period between Sons of Sparta (2026) and Ascension (2013), and a later period between God of War (2005) and Ghost of Sparta (2010). For the majority of the series, it narrates the events of the past via flashbacks with occasional focus on present events. In both, protagonist Kratos traverses Ancient Greece and the Aegean Sea on a quest for the Ambrosia of Asclepius.

=== Characters ===
As in the video game series, the comic book's protagonist is Kratos. The story references two periods in Kratos's life; his boyhood training and life in the Spartan Army as the unwitting champion of Ares, and the narrative present, in which he has assumed the role of God of War after defeating Ares. The segments of the story set in the past feature several Olympian gods, including Ares, the God of War; Artemis, the Goddess of the Hunt; Hades, the God of the Underworld; Helios, the God of the Sun; Hermes, the God of Speed, Thievery, and Wild Animals; and Poseidon, the God of the Sea. In the present, Kratos encounters his ally and mentor Athena, the Goddess of Wisdom, and the Chaos Giant, Gyges. Minor characters from Kratos's first adventure include Captain Nikos, the King of Sparta, and Kratos's wife, Lysandra, and daughter, Calliope. The champions of the gods include: Pothia, champion of Artemis and the warrior-queen of an Amazonian tribe; Cereyon, fiery champion of Helios; Danaus, champion of Hermes who can magically control beasts; Herodius, champion of Poseidon from the village of Thera; and Alrik, champion of Hades and prince of the Barbarians.

=== Plot ===
The present day story is set after Kratos's defeat of the former God of War, Ares. After taking that position himself, Kratos sets out on a quest to destroy the legendary Ambrosia of Asclepius, an elixir with magical healing properties that he once found when he was a soldier in Sparta. During his quest, Kratos has flashbacks to this period, as he searches for the Ambrosia to save his newly-born daughter, Calliope, who is suffering from the plague. Given until the next full moon, General Kratos travels with a host of Spartans to find the Ambrosia. During this period, he takes counsel from Captain Nikos, his superior in the Spartan army who instructs him about the Spartan code of honor.

Several of the Olympian gods—Artemis, Hades, Helios, Hermes, and Poseidon—decide to enter into a wager with Ares. Each will choose a champion who is in search of the Ambrosia, with the successful god receiving an award (e.g., having statues erected in their honor across Greece). Kratos kills two of the champions—Herodius and Pothia—and repels attacks by monsters sent by the gods to thwart him. A desperate Hades kills Nikos, who sacrifices himself to save Kratos, passing on the rank of captain. Danaus is killed by Alrik, who retains Danaus's head to possess his magical ability. Kratos locates the "Tree of Life", the source of the Ambrosia located on a small island, and confronts Cereyon. After being almost burned alive, Kratos drowns his foe and successfully retrieves the Ambrosia, but as he leaves, he and his Spartan troops are ambushed by Alrik's horde of barbarians. When Hades observes the Spartans defeating the Barbarians, the god attempts to have the Spartans dragged to the Underworld. Alrik uses the head of Danaus to summon rocs to attack Kratos as he flies away on a similar bird with the stolen Ambrosia. Kratos pursues Alrik on a captured roc, knowing that although his men will be taken to the Underworld, they will be honored in Sparta for their sacrifices. Alrik and Kratos battle, during which, the waterskin containing the Ambrosia is punctured, spraying both men. Alrik critically wounds the Spartan, who is subsequently healed thanks to the Ambrosia.

Kratos gains control of Danaus's head and uses its power against Alrik, who is torn apart by rocs. Having also been covered with the Ambrosia, Alrik is revived only to be killed once again until the Ambrosia is spent. Kratos then escapes and returns to Sparta with the Ambrosia, saving his daughter, and giving the King of Sparta the rest of the elixir, who then officially awards Kratos the rank of captain in the Spartan Army. Bitter at having lost the wager, Hades resurrects Alrik, who becomes King after his father dies and swears vengeance against Kratos.

In the present, Kratos overcomes several obstacles in his quest to find the Ambrosia, including defeating a giant spider, ignoring Athena's pleas to stop his quest, and overcoming the reanimated corpses of Captain Nikos and his men—a final attempt by Hades to stop the Spartan. On returning to the island, Kratos discovers that the island is actually one of the Chaos Giants, the fifty-headed and one hundred armed Gyges. An outraged Gyges explains that Kratos had thwarted the Giant's plan to use the elixir to resurrect his brothers Briareus and Cottus, and then reclaim the world. In his fiery battle with Cereyon, Kratos inadvertently burned off Gyges's one hundred arms, and then stole the Ambrosia. Without arms and now unable to reach the Ambrosia, Gyges was forced to wait for Kratos's return. During the battle, Kratos reveals that he seeks to destroy the elixir to prevent the worshipers of the slain god Ares from resurrecting their master. Kratos then uses the Fire of Apollo to destroy both the Tree of Life and Gyges.

== Reception ==
An example of Andrea Sorrentino's artwork (from God of War #3): described as "muddy."

The God of War comic series received mixed reviews. Mike Murphy of Platform Nation stated that although the comic series serves as a good prequel to the video game series, "the story is bogged down by horrible art...[it's] muddy, confusing, and consistently pulls you out of the story as you try to figure out just what is going on from panel to panel". Rating it 5 out of 10, Murphy said that he "can’t give this one a pass, even to the hardcore God of War fans" who should "skip it".

After reading God of War #1, Joe Juba of Game Informer said "If you have a choice between reading this comic and doing something else, you should do something else...like play God of War III again". He said that the story adds nothing of value and it is rough. Despite being written by Marv Wolfman, he said the story does not satisfy fans of the video game series: "I didn't think the story made much sense, and it doesn't contribute to the overall lore of the universe; it just seems to be setting Kratos up for another fetch-quest". He also felt that the writing was exceptionally low in quality. A review from Comic Vine said, "The idea here screams comic books", however, the "results were a mixed offering". The reviewer stated that the idea of Kratos finding the Ambrosia to save Calliope was a "perfect comic book incentive", however, things started to disintegrate when the distinction between the present and the past became unclear. A four out of five star review from Binary Messiah praised the comic series, saying that it could be made into a full game: "That's one freaking awesome story. That right there is a premise to a whole new God of War game". They said that it "does a good job showing the hot headedness of Kratos and his selfishness". Saying that the comics do the video game series justice, for fans of God of War, this should be in their comic collection.

A review from GameSpot stated that the art appears moody, but also said it is "muddy...with a heavy digital assist from Photoshop". Although the effects were sometimes stunning, other times they were "distracting, or even chuckle-inducing". Despite the criticism over the art, GameSpot's review said that it is "distinctive, and lends the story a very specific tone", and that "[it] matches the world of God of War well enough, ... the same way Kratos' anger overshadows any possible storytelling subtlety in the [video game] series". Juba gave some praise to the art, stating that it "is kind of neat" and "it's stylish, if nothing else". Binary Messiah was disappointed in the art. They said it is very murky and washed out with black. Although there is some realism in the art, it does not match the art of the games. They also noted a mistake with the flashback scenes, as in these scenes, it shows Kratos with his ash-white skin, but this complexion did not occur until after he slayed his family. They did praise it for being gory like the games, and said "While the art may be iffy, it does have an excellent atmosphere of darkness and constant betrayal".
