= God of War (franchise) =

Video game franchise

- The Norse-based logo of the franchise introduced in 2016; 2022's Ragnarök and its related merchandise uses blue for the Omega symbol instead of red
- Genres: Action-adventure; Hack and slash
- Developers: Primary: Santa Monica Studio (Note: Main installments: God of War (2005), God of War II, God of War III, Ascension, God of War (2018), and Ragnarök); Ready at Dawn (Note: PSP installments: Chains of Olympus and Ghost of Sparta); Javaground/SOE-LA (Note: Mobile installment: Betrayal); Mega Cat Studios (Note: Side game: Sons of Sparta); Ports: Bluepoint Games (Note: God of War Collection for PS3); Ready at Dawn (Note: God of War: Origins Collection for PS3); Sanzaru Games (Note: God of War Collection for PS Vita); Wholesale Algorithms (Note: God of War III Remastered for PS4); Jetpack Interactive (Note: God of War (2018) and Ragnarök for Windows)
- Publishers: Sony Interactive Entertainment (Note: Formerly Sony Computer Entertainment. Published all installments except Betrayal.); Sony Pictures Digital (Note: Published Betrayal for mobile phones)
- Creator: David Jaffe
- Artist: Charlie Wen
- Writers: Marianne Krawczyk (Greek games); Matt Sophos (Norse games); Richard Gaubert (Norse games)
- Platforms: PlayStation 2; Java ME; PlayStation Portable; PlayStation 3; PlayStation Vita; PlayStation 4; PlayStation 5; Windows
- First release: God of War; March 22, 2005
- Latest release: God of War Sons of Sparta; February 12, 2026

God of War is an action-adventure game franchise created by David Jaffe and developed by Sony's Santa Monica Studio. It began in 2005 on the PlayStation 2 (PS2) and has become a flagship PlayStation series, with 10 installments across multiple platforms and two more games in development. Santa Monica Studio has developed the six main entries with two additional games in the works, while Ready at Dawn, Javaground/Sony Online Entertainment-Los Angeles (SOE-LA), and Mega Cat Studios developed the four side games. Sony Interactive Entertainment (SIE) has published all games except the mobile phone installment, which was published by Sony Pictures Digital.

Based on ancient mythologies, the series' main plot follows Kratos, a Spartan warrior who becomes the God of War and comes into conflict with various mythological pantheons. The earlier games in the series are based on Greek mythology, referred to as the Greek era, and see Kratos follow a path of vengeance against the Olympian gods. The later games are based on Norse mythology, referred to as the Norse era, and see Kratos on a path of redemption while also introducing his son Atreus as a secondary protagonist, as they come into conflict or interact with various Norse deities and figures. Laufey, Kratos's second wife and Atreus's mother, will be introduced as a main protagonist in the next installment that is in development, which will introduce other mythologies to the series, such as Egyptian and Mongolian mythologies.

The first seven games plus the 2026 title make up the Greek era of the franchise. God of War (2005), God of War II (2007), and God of War III (2010) comprise its main trilogy; the first two were released on the PS2 with the third on the PlayStation 3 (PS3). A prequel and the fourth mainline title, Ascension (2013), was also released for the PS3. Other games include Chains of Olympus (2008) and Ghost of Sparta (2010) for the PlayStation Portable (PSP), and the two-dimensional (2D) side-scroller, Betrayal (2007), for mobile phones that supported the Java Platform, Micro Edition (Java ME). The series returned to the Greek setting with Sons of Sparta (2026), a 2D Metroidvania game that takes place during Kratos's youth and was released for PlayStation 5 (PS5) and later PS4.

The Norse era currently only comprises two games: God of War (2018) and Ragnarök (2022), the latter of which received an epilogue in the form of an expansion pack titled Valhalla (2023). A third Norse era game, Laufey, is in development for a 2027 release. Both the 2018 installment and Ragnarök were released for PlayStation 4 (PS4), with Ragnarök simultaneously released on PS5; both received Windows ports in January 2022 and September 2024, respectively. The 2018 installment was also accompanied by a short prequel story, A Call from the Wilds (2018), a text-based game that was available through Facebook Messenger for a limited time. Laufey is in development for the PS5 as the seventh mainline title, which will be a spin-off featuring Laufey, also known as Faye, as the main character, with the game's narrative occurring simultaneously with that of both the 2018 installment and Ragnarök, following her journey in the afterlife where she comes into conflict with the gods of war of other mythologies. Another untitled game was also confirmed to release after Laufey with Kratos back as the main character and connecting directly to Laufey.

Games in the series have been praised as some of the best action games of all time. The series has received numerous awards, including several Game of the Year recognitions for the 2005 and 2018 installments. Some games have also been remastered for newer PlayStation platforms, and a remake of the original trilogy is in development. As of November 2023, the franchise has sold an estimated 66+ million games worldwide, and is PlayStation's most profitable first-party brand. Strong sales and support of the series led to the franchise's expansion into other media, such as three comic book series and three novels. A film adaptation of the original installment had been in development but was ultimately canceled; however, a television series adaptation of the Norse era is in development for Amazon Prime Video. Merchandise includes artwork, clothing, toys, and prop replicas, as well as the games' soundtracks, including a heavy metal album, Blood & Metal (2010), featuring original music by various bands, who were inspired by the Greek era of the series.

== Games ==
Release timeline Greek mythology Norse mythology Bold text for main installments, asterisks (*) for re-releases
2005	God of War (PS2)
2006
2007	God of War II (PS2)
2007	God of War: Betrayal (mobile)
2008	God of War: Chains of Olympus (PSP)
2009	*God of War Collection (PS3)
2010	God of War III (PS3)
2010	God of War: Ghost of Sparta (PSP)
2011	*God of War: Origins Collection (PS3)
2012	*God of War Saga (PS3)
2013	God of War: Ascension (PS3)
2014	*God of War Collection (Vita)
2015	*God of War III Remastered (PS4)
2016
2017
2018	God of War: A Call from the Wilds (Facebook)
2018	God of War (PS4)
2019
2020
2021
2022	*God of War (PC)
2022	God of War Ragnarök (PS4 & PS5)
2023	God of War Ragnarök: Valhalla (PS4 & PS5)
2024	*God of War Ragnarök + Valhalla (PC)
2025
2026	God of War Sons of Sparta (PS5 & PS4)
2027	God of War Laufey (PS5)
TBA	*God of War Trilogy Remake (PS5)
TBA	Untitled God of War

=== Greek mythology ===
God of War was first released in North America on March 22, 2005, for the PlayStation 2. After 10 years in the service of the Olympian gods, Spartan soldier Kratos is tasked by Athena to find Pandora's box, the key to defeating Ares, the God of War, who is running amok through Athens. A series of flashbacks reveals that Kratos was once the servant of Ares, who saved Kratos and his army from annihilation in battle, but tricked him into killing his family, which forced his metamorphosis into the "Ghost of Sparta". Kratos eventually finds Pandora's Box, and after finally killing Ares, he ascends to Mount Olympus to become the new God of War.

God of War II was first released in North America on March 13, 2007, for the PlayStation 2. Angry at his fellow gods, Kratos runs amok across the city of Rhodes. Zeus intervenes and betrays Kratos, who is saved by Gaia. She tells him he must now find the Sisters of Fate, who can change his fate and prevent his death at the hands of Zeus. Kratos is ultimately successful and as he is about to kill the god, Athena sacrifices herself to save Zeus and preserve Olympus, and tells Kratos that he is Zeus' son and that he betrayed Kratos out of fear. Kratos then joins forces with Gaia and the Titans to attack Olympus.

God of War: Betrayal was released on June 20, 2007, for mobile phones supporting the Java Platform, Micro Edition. It was the first game in the series to be released as a two-dimensional (2D) side-scroller and the first that was released on a non-PlayStation platform and is also the only to never receive a PlayStation release. The narrative of the game takes place between the events of Ghost of Sparta and God of War II. The God of War Kratos is framed for murder and rampages across Greece, seeking the true assassin. Kratos succumbs to bloodlust and kills Ceryx, the son of the god Hermes—an act that alienates him from his fellow gods.

God of War: Chains of Olympus was first released in North America on March 4, 2008, for the PlayStation Portable. Its narrative takes place sometime between Ascension and God of War during Kratos' 10 years of service to the gods. Kratos halts a Persian invasion of the Greek city of Attica, and learns that the world has been plunged into darkness by the god Morpheus. Kratos investigates the abduction of the sun god Helios, and prevents the Machiavellian plan of the goddess Persephone to use the Titan Atlas to destroy the world.

God of War III was first released in North America on March 16, 2010, for the PlayStation 3. Reigniting the Great War, Kratos is soon abandoned by the Titans, who were only using him to exact their own revenge. Now seeking revenge against both the Titans and Olympian gods, he is helped by the spirit of Athena, who was elevated to a new level of understanding and instructs him to seek the Flame of Olympus in order to defeat Zeus. Kratos engages the gods and the Titans in a series of battles across the Underworld and Olympus and learns that Pandora's Box is within the Flame. He discovers that Pandora herself is the key to pacifying the Flame and allowing him to open the Box, at the expense of her life. After finally killing Zeus and with Olympus destroyed, Kratos refuses to help Athena assume the role of new patron of mankind and disappears.

God of War: Ghost of Sparta was first released in North America on November 2, 2010, for the PlayStation Portable. Set between the events of God of War and Betrayal, the God of War Kratos is still haunted by visions of his mortal past and embarks on a quest to discover his origins by finding his mother, Callisto. He learns that his brother Deimos was taken by the gods and imprisoned by the God of Death, Thanatos, and decides to find and save his sibling. Although successful, Thanatos engages the brothers in combat, and kills Deimos. Kratos then kills Thanatos and returns to Olympus, further enraged at the gods.

God of War: Ascension was first released in North America on March 12, 2013, for the PlayStation 3. It was the first game in the series to feature multiplayer, which is online-only for both competitive and cooperative play. Taking place sometime between Sons of Sparta and Chains of Olympus, the game is set roughly six months after Kratos was tricked into killing his wife and daughter, and sees him imprisoned by the three Furies for breaking his blood oath to Ares. With the help of the oath keeper and Ares' estranged son Orkos, Kratos learns that the God of War and the Furies plan to overthrow Mount Olympus and that Ares chose Kratos as his servant to help him for that very purpose. The Spartan escapes his imprisonment and eventually kills the Furies, as well as Orkos, who begs for release. Although free of Ares' bond, Kratos begins to suffer the nightmares that plague him for years.

God of War Sons of Sparta was first released for the PlayStation 5 on February 12, 2026, with a PlayStation 4 version releasing later that year on November 16. Predating Ascension, it is a prequel to the entire series as the game follows a 13-year-old Kratos as he trains at the Agoge in Sparta with his 11-year-old brother Deimos as they explore Laconia in search of a missing Spartan comrade. The story is narrated by an adult Kratos during his time as a captain in the Spartan Army, who is in between deployments and tells the story to his daughter Calliope to help her understand the meaning of duty. A Metroidvania game, it is the second installment to be presented as a 2D side-scroller as well as to feature a multiplayer component, which is only available locally (offline) in a roguelite challenge mode.

=== Norse mythology ===
God of War: A Call from the Wilds was a short text-based game, released through Facebook Messenger on February 1, 2018, but it was only accessible for a limited time. It served as a prelude story to 2018's God of War, and followed Atreus on his first adventure in the Norse wilds. Additionally, a smartphone companion app called Mimir's Vision released on April 17, 2018, and provided some background for the Norse setting.

God of War was released worldwide on April 20, 2018, for the PlayStation 4, and for Windows (PC) through Steam on January 14, 2022, which marked the first main installment released on a non-PlayStation platform. The game was a new direction for the series, not only by its new mythological setting, but also by its gameplay. Many years after the events of God of War III, Kratos has ended up in the world of Norse mythology in ancient Norway in the realm of Midgard, and has a son named Atreus. After Kratos' second wife named Faye, who is also Atreus' mother, passes away, the two set out on a journey to fulfill her final wish of spreading her ashes at the highest peak of the nine realms, later revealed to be in Jötunheim by new ally Mímir. Along their journey, they are attacked by the Æsir god Baldur, who was sent by the Allfather Odin to get to Faye in order to prevent Ragnarök, unaware she had died. After Kratos eventually kills Baldur, the three-year-long Fimbulwinter begins, with Ragnarök soon to follow. While Baldur's mother, the Vanir goddess Freya, swears revenge on Kratos, he and Atreus complete their journey and discover that Faye was a Giant who had foreseen the future and that Atreus was originally named Loki.

God of War Ragnarök was released worldwide on November 9, 2022, for the PlayStation 4 and the PlayStation 5, marking the first cross-gen release in the series; it was later released on Steam on September 19, 2024. At the end of the three-year Fimbulwinter, Kratos, Atreus, and Mímir are confronted by Odin and the God of Thunder Thor. After dueling Thor, the three set out on a journey across the nine realms in hopes of finding a way to prevent the world-ending event, Ragnarök. Along the way, they are confronted by a vengeful Freya, but they eventually make amends. Unable to prevent Ragnarök—which is discovered to only destroy Asgard, the home of the Æsir—Kratos, Atreus, and their allies unite the realms in a war against the Æsir gods in their home realm. Kratos battles Thor once again, but Thor is killed by Odin for refusing to kill Kratos. Kratos, Atreus, Mímir, and Freya then engage Odin in battle and defeat the Allfather as Asgard is destroyed. Returning home to Midgard, Atreus, as Loki, decides that he needs to go and find any remaining Giants and bids a heartfelt farewell while Kratos learns that he is destined to become a revered god. Along with Freya and Mímir, they begin to rebuild the realms and restore peace.

God of War Ragnarök: Valhalla is a free downloadable content (DLC) pack that was released on December 12, 2023, for both the PlayStation 4 and PlayStation 5 versions of Ragnarök and was included with the game's Steam release on September 19, 2024. Featuring roguelite gameplay, the expansion pack serves as an epilogue to Ragnarök, following Kratos and Mímir in a series of trials in Valhalla. Through the trials, Kratos comes to terms with his past life in Greece and takes the mantle as the Norse God of War.

God of War Laufey is an upcoming game in development for the PlayStation 5 and is scheduled to be released on May 20, 2027, delayed from its original February 16 date. Announced on June 2, 2026, during Sony's State of Play presentation, it will be a mainline title featuring the titular character Laufey, also known as Faye, as the main protagonist, marking the first game to not have Kratos as the main character. The game's narrative will occur simultaneously with that of the 2018 installment and Ragnarök as Faye arrives in Everywhen, the afterlife of the gods of all mythologies, after her funeral that was depicted at the beginning of God of War (2018). Faye battles various gods of war in Everywhen as she discovers that her plans to protect Kratos and Atreus are at risk.

An untitled God of War was confirmed by Cory Barlog at Comic-Con 2026 on July 24, 2026. Barlog said it would have Kratos back as the main character with its story connecting directly to Laufey.

=== Collections and remasters ===
God of War Collection was first released in North America on November 17, 2009, for the PlayStation 3—the franchise's first appearance on the platform. It is a remastered port of the original God of War and God of War II. The games were ported by Bluepoint Games and feature high-definition 1080p anti-aliased graphics at 60 frames per second and trophies. Sanzaru Games later ported the collection to the PlayStation Vita and it was released in May 2014—the franchise's only appearance on this platform.

God of War: Origins Collection was first released in North America on September 13, 2011, for the PlayStation 3. It is a remastered port of the two PlayStation Portable installments in the series—Chains of Olympus and Ghost of Sparta. The porting was done by the individual games's original developer, Ready at Dawn, with God of War Origins featuring 1080p high-definition video, anti-aliased graphics at 60 frames per second, DualShock 3 rumble features, trophies, and it is the only God of War release to feature Stereoscopic 3D.

God of War Saga was released in North America on August 28, 2012. It is a collection of five of the God of War games for the PlayStation 3, released as part of Sony's PlayStation Collections line. The collection includes the original God of War, God of War II, God of War III, Chains of Olympus, and Ghost of Sparta. It features two Blu-ray Discs—God of War I and II on the first and III on the second—and a voucher to download Chains of Olympus and Ghost of Sparta. The games retain the same features as their first PS3 releases.

God of War III Remastered was first released in North America on July 14, 2015, for the PlayStation 4—the franchise's first appearance on the platform. It is a remastered version of God of War III, and features full 1080p support targeted at 60 frames per second, a photo mode, and all downloadable content of the original. The game's announcement and release was in celebration of the franchise's 10th anniversary. It was ported by Wholesale Algorithms.

God of War Trilogy Remake is an upcoming collection consisting of remakes of the original God of War, God of War II, and God of War III. It was announced as part of the franchise's 20th-anniversary year during Sony's State of Play presentation in February 2026. At the time of the announcement, the project was in early development.

== Gameplay ==
The series consists of eight single-player-only games, and two that include multiplayer. Throughout the first era, the games featured a third-person, fixed cinematic camera with the exception of Betrayal, which was the first to feature a 2D side-scrolling view; the February 2026 prequel, Sons of Sparta, is also a 2D side-scroller. For 2018's God of War and Ragnarök, the camera was switched from being fixed and became an over-the-shoulder free camera. A first-person camera is featured in God of War III and Ascension during certain scripted sequences. Throughout the series, the player controls the character Kratos in a combination of hack and slash combat, platforming, and puzzle game elements to achieve goals and complete the story (platforming elements were removed from the second era games due to the camera change). The 2018 installment added Kratos' son Atreus, and although the game is played entirely as Kratos, there are times when the player may choose to passively control Atreus (a button is dedicated to Atreus, and he will fire an arrow from his bow depending on where the camera is pointed). While Atreus is still an accompanying character in Ragnarök (in addition to a couple of other characters), there are some story missions where the player takes full control of Atreus; his combat is similar to Kratos' but he uses a bow.

Throughout the Greek games, Kratos' main weapon is a pair of double-chained blades that appear in three iterations: the Blades of Chaos, the Blades of Athena (or Athena's Blades), and the Blades of Exile. They each perform similarly, but differ in the types of combos and amount of damage each yields, as well as cosmetic differences. Other weapons are also obtained during the games and vary in gameplay. Magic is also used, and four abilities are typically acquired. God of War III differs in that instead of separate abilities, there are four primary weapons that possess their own respective magic offensive. The game also features "Items"—additional secondary weapons with limited usage, such as the Bow of Apollo. With each new game, most weapons and magic are lost via a plot device, and a new arsenal of weapons and abilities are acquired during gameplay. Ascension differs from the previous games in that instead of acquiring new weapons that are kept throughout the entire game, the player collects up to five World Weapons (such as a sword or a javelin) that have limited usage. When there is not a World Weapon equipped, the player can punch or kick foes as part of a new mechanic added to the game. In the Norse games, Kratos' primary weapon is a magical battle axe called the Leviathan Axe. It can be thrown and summoned back to his hand, similar to Thor's hammer Mjölnir. Later on in 2018's God of War, he recovers the Blades of Chaos, which is retained in Ragnarök. They perform similarly as they did during the Greek games, but with different abilities. Both the Leviathan Axe and Blades of Chaos, as well as the Draupnir Spear introduced in Ragnarök, can be upgraded to use special magical attacks called runic attacks. Each weapon has a light and heavy runic attack, and the player can choose which runic attacks to equip on the weapons.

The series offers combo-based combat, and includes a quick time event (QTE) feature, also called context sensitive attacks, which is initiated when the player has weakened a foe or to perform a defensive maneuver. It allows limited control of Kratos during the QTE cinematic sequence; success ends the battle, while failure usually results in damage to the player. As well as the QTE system, Ascension features a prompt-less free-form system, allowing players the choice of when to attack or dodge based on the enemy's actions. A grab maneuver can be used on minor foes. The Norse games changed this up; after an enemy has been weakened enough, a prompt will appear above its head, and depending on the enemy, Kratos may rip it in half or grab them and throw them into other enemies, among other possible outcomes. He will also jump on top of and ride large enemies, such as ogres, causing them to attack other enemies, similar to the cyclopes in the Greek games.

A cropped gameplay screenshot from the original God of War (2005): weakening foes allows the use of controller buttons for greater damage or finishing moves; this gameplay mechanic has been utilized throughout the series

Relics, which the player can use in successive games (such as Poseidon's Trident obtained in the original God of War allowing Kratos to swim underwater for extended periods) are also found and necessary for game progression. Kratos often has a special ability, which provides temporary invulnerability and increased attack damage. This ability has become an ongoing feature of gameplay throughout the series—Rage of the Gods in the original God of War and Ascension, Rage of the Titans in God of War II, Rage of Sparta in God of War III, and Thera's Bane in Ghost of Sparta. This ability can be recharged by building hits on foes in combat, and gaining game-specific orbs. Thera's Bane, however, is recharged automatically. While Kratos does not retain any relics from the Greek era in 2018's God of War, he does have a rage ability, called Spartan Rage, and with this ability, Kratos uses powerful bare-handed attacks, as opposed to weapons, to greatly damage enemies. Ragnarök enhanced the Spartan Rage ability, giving two other variants, one providing health and another delivering a powerful weapon attack depending on the weapon equipped. Another variant was introduced in Ragnarök's expansion Valhalla, which allows the player to use the Blade of Olympus, similar to the rage ability from God of War III.

Gorgon Eyes and Phoenix Feathers, found throughout the Greek games in unmarked chests (white chests in Ascension), increase the maximum amount of health and magic, respectively. Minotaur Horns, which increase the Items and Fire meter's maximum length, are available in God of War III and Ghost of Sparta, respectively. The Items meter allows the use of secondary weapons, called Items, and the Fire meter allows the use of the Thera's Bane ability. The meters are increased in increments and reach their maximum once a certain number of Eyes, Feathers, and Horns are found. Other chests contain green, blue, or red orbs. Green orbs replenish the player's health, blue orbs replenish magic allowing further usage, and red orbs provide experience points (XP) for upgrading weapons and magic for new, more powerful attacks, and replenish the Rage meter in the original God of War. Gold orbs found in God of War II and Ascension, and white orbs in God of War III, replenish the Rage meter instead of red orbs; the Rage meter in Ascension is also refilled by landing attacks on foes. Chests with changing colors, which allow players to choose which meter to replenish, have also been available. Red orbs can also be collected by killing foes and destroying certain inanimate objects. Bosses and more powerful opponents release a combination of colored orbs when killed via the quick-time feature. For the Norse games, Apples of Iðunn replaced the Gorgon Eyes to increase the maximum length of the health meter, while Horns of Blood Mead increase the maximum length of the rage meter. The Norse games also changed the green and red orbs to stones, which need to be stomped in order to replenish the health and rage meters. Magic is also done differently. Instead of collecting blue orbs to replenish magic, there is a cool down time on magical runic attacks, and once that cool down time is up, the magical runic attack can be used again. Furthermore, players accumulate different crafting resources, primarily Hacksilver, to create and purchase new items, such as new armor or upgrading existing armor and weapons, and XP is used for learning new combat skills. Chests in the Norse games provide a variety of different items.

With the exception of Ascension, each installment offers a challenge mode, which yields extra red orbs (or XP), secret costumes, and behind-the-scenes videos. Bonus content can also be unlocked by defeating the game's difficulty levels. The Norse games also include a challenge mode, located in the realm Muspelheim, which rewards various items upon completion. Battle arenas, which allow players to set difficulty levels and choose their own opponents, are included in God of War II, God of War III, and Ghost of Sparta. Ragnarök's expansion Valhalla introduced its own version of a battle arena in the form of the trials of Valhalla, which uses elements of the roguelite genre. Excluding Betrayal, the Greek games were known for including a quick-time sex minigame in each installment until Ascension, which dropped the mini-game.

Ascension was the first installment in the series to feature multiplayer, which is online-only for both competitive and cooperative play. Up to eight players on two teams of two to four players (or a four to eight player deathmatch) battle for control of a map in order to earn rewards from the gods. Players can also fight each other in one-on-one matches. Players must align with either Zeus, Hades, Ares, or Poseidon, which allows them to try different weapons, armor sets, and powers inspired by the god of their choice, and extras can be unlocked. A multiplayer option returned with Sons of Sparta, and similar to Valhalla, it is a roguelite challenge mode called the Pit of Agonies, but unlike Ascension, this mode is for local multiplayer (offline) and can also be done solo. At launch, it could only be accessed after the player completed the main game, but in an update patch on February 26, 2026, players can input a cheat code to unlock it sooner.

== Development ==
=== Main series ===
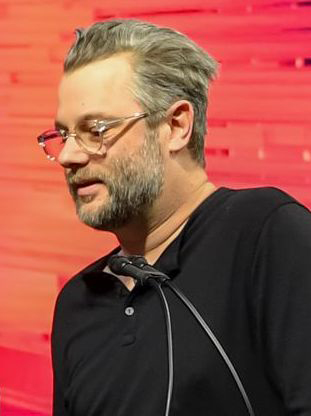
Cory Barlog, one of the main contributors to the God of War series; to date, he has worked on seven games, with his most notable roles being game director of 2007's God of War II and 2018's God of War

==== PlayStation 2 ====
After the success of their first game Kinetica (2001), Santa Monica Studio began development of the original God of War in 2002, and unveiled it two years later at SCEA Santa Monica Gamers' Day 2004. Game director and creator David Jaffe said that although the idea for God of War was his own, the concept owed a debt to Capcom because he had played Onimusha and said "let's do that with Greek mythology". He was inspired in part by the 1981 feature film, Clash of the Titans, saying, "the real high concept for me was ... merging it with Heavy Metal magazine". He said he liked both "the kids stuff ... with Greek mythology" and the idea of adding more adult themes such as sex and violence. He was also inspired by the 1981 film Raiders of the Lost Ark. Although the game is based on Greek mythology, the development team gave themselves "lots of freedom" to modify the myths, and Jaffe said they took the "coolest aspects of the subject" and created art and story using those elements. Director of visual development and lead concept artist, Charlie Wen, drew inspiration from these films as well as more contemporary films such as Gladiator (2001) for tonal inspiration to lead the visual design of Kratos, other characters, and the world of God of War. The gameplay of the Strider arcade franchise was also a vital influence on God of War, and the developers described the gameplay "as merging the action of Devil May Cry with the puzzle-solving of Ico" and noted that players would be able to "sunder enemies with a single move, such as by ripping them in half". The game uses Santa Monica's Kinetica engine, which they developed for Kinetica.

A sequel to God of War was first teased at the end of its credits, which stated, "Kratos Will Return". God of War II was officially announced at the 2006 Game Developers Conference (GDC). David Jaffe stepped down and became the creative director of its sequel and God of War's lead animator Cory Barlog assumed the role of game director. Barlog said that in the game, players would see "a larger view of Kratos' role within the mythological world". Like God of War, the game uses Santa Monica's Kinetica engine. Magic attacks became an integral part of the combat system and it was more refined. New creatures and heroes from the mythology, and more boss battles were added. Both Jaffe and Barlog said that they did not view God of War II as a sequel, but rather a continuation of the previous game. Jaffe said that they did not want to include the Roman numeral number two (II) in the title for this reason, but they did not want the title to convey the impression it was an expansion pack. Both Jaffe and Barlog said that the reason God of War II appeared on the PlayStation 2 instead of the PlayStation 3—which was released four months prior to God of War II—was because "there's a 100 million people out there that will be able to play God of War II as soon as it launches". Barlog assured that the game would be playable on the newer platform, which originally had PlayStation 2 backwards compatibility.

==== PlayStation 3 ====
God of War III was first mentioned by Cory Barlog at a God of War II launch event, and it was officially announced at the 2008 Electronic Entertainment Expo (E3). After serving as game director during the first eight months of development, Barlog left Santa Monica for other opportunities and Stig Asmussen took on the role, having previously been the lead environment artist and art director on God of War and God of War II, respectively. Asmussen said that one of the greatest challenges in developing God of War III for the PlayStation 3 was the "complexity of everything"; individual tasks, such as designing Helios' decapitation, could take a year because the "level of detail [that was] expected [was] so high and intricate, it [crossed] multiple departments". He said that the PlayStation 3's hardware capabilities allowed more flexibility in character creation and interaction with the environment. The engine for God of War III was ported from the first two installments to the PlayStation 3. As the game was being developed, the code department swapped out PlayStation 2 components with PlayStation 3 components. They replaced the renderer, the particle system, and the collision system. Although they were re-using the engine from God of War II, the core engine for God of War III was brand new. Between E3 2009 and the time the game shipped, morphological anti-aliasing (MLAA) was added, which graphics engineer Ben Diamand said "improved edges dramatically and saved substantial amounts of frame-rate". Diamand also said that "depth-of-field, motion blur, crepuscular 'God' rays and refraction were either added or improved in quality and speed" during that same time period.

On April 12, 2012, Sony released a teaser image for Ascension on its official PlayStation Facebook page, which was followed by the game's announcement on April 19 on PlayStation.Blog. Todd Papy, who had previously worked as a designer on God of War and God of War II and as design director on God of War III, assumed the role of game director; God of War III director Stig Asmussen was busy with another project at Santa Monica and did not work on Ascension. The announcement officially confirmed the game's title and Papy said it was not titled God of War IV to avoid confusion because it is a prequel, rather than a sequel, to the trilogy. The game features a retooled God of War III engine, which enabled online multiplayer battles for up to eight players. The decision to add multiplayer came about from curiosity, according to lead combat designer Jason McDonald. The multiplayer was first tested using Kratos, and McDonald said the testers had "a lot of fun". Seeing their reaction made the team feel that the multiplayer had value and they then began to put the "God of War spin on it". In the developmental transition from God of War III to Ascension, one of the graphics engineers, Cedric Perthuis, noted that the limits of the God of War III engine restricted artist creativity, so they "tried to remove or push those limits as far as possible without losing any performance". Ascension did not have a graphical leap over its predecessor like God of War III did. Dynamic lighting was added, which allowed for development of the Life Cycle gameplay mechanic. Particle effects were also greatly improved upon from God of War III.

==== PlayStation 4 and PlayStation 5 ====
Santa Monica began work on the fifth main installment in 2014, which was confirmed by the returning Cory Barlog at the first annual PlayStation Experience on December 6 that year. The official announcement came at the 2016 Electronic Entertainment Expo (E3) with a gameplay demo, which also confirmed that Barlog had returned to the series as game director. The game was deliberately titled God of War with no numeral or subtitle because although it is a continuation of the series, "we [reimagined] everything". Other mythologies were also considered for the new setting, but Norse was picked to keep the focus on Kratos; there was also consideration to use a different protagonist, but it was decided to keep Kratos as he "is intrinsically tied" to the series. In adapting the Norse myths, Barlog said there were many different translations and interpretations, and just like they did with Greek mythology in the previous games, they found ways to parallel path things from the myths to fit their story. Most of the development team that worked on the original God of War worked on the new installment. They claimed that they matched the new gameplay with the same level of accessibility as the previous installments. Some gameplay characteristics found in the previous installments were cut, such as jumping, swimming, and instant-death platforming challenges; these were cut due to the camera being closer to Kratos. Although Ascension had introduced multiplayer to the series, the team dropped the mode to focus on the single-player experience. The Leviathan Axe was chosen as Kratos' new main weapon because the developers wanted a more grounded direction for the game. Although the game never reaches this number, the enemy count was increased to be able to support up to 100 enemies on-screen; God of War III and Ascension could do up to 50. Although the game was built for the standard PlayStation 4, Barlog confirmed that it would "benefit from the power" of the PlayStation 4 Pro; an updated version of the PS4 that can render games in 4K resolution and was released a few months after God of War was announced. The game's story was estimated to take 25–35 hours to complete, which is significantly more than the previous four main installments, which each took an average of 10 hours to complete. In February 2021, three months after the launch of the PlayStation 5, which is backwards compatible with PS4 games, Santa Monica released a patch to further enhance the playing experience of God of War on the PS5. As part of Sony's larger efforts to port their first-party exclusive games to Windows, Santa Monica announced in October 2021 that God of War would be released for the platform on January 14, 2022, with support for graphics options. This in turn marked the first main entry in the series to release on a non-PlayStation platform.

Following the announcement of the 2018 installment in June 2016, Cory Barlog confirmed that the 2018 game would not be Kratos' last. The ending of the 2018 installment also teased a sequel; it ended with Ragnarök looming, as well as a secret ending that showed a vision of the Æsir god Thor confronting Kratos and Atreus at the end of Fimbulwinter. During the 2020 PlayStation 5 (PS5) Showcase event on September 16, a new God of War was officially announced for a 2021 release on the newer console. When the game was first announced, it was only announced as a PS5 title; however, in June 2021, it was confirmed that the game would release on both the PS4 and PS5, marking the first cross-gen release in the series. Development was partly impacted by the COVID-19 pandemic, resulting in the game being delayed to 2022. In September 2021, the game's title was confirmed as God of War Ragnarök. During the 2021 PlayStation Showcase event, Eric Williams, who worked on every previous installment, was confirmed as the game's director, continuing the previous era's tradition of having a different director for each game; Barlog served as creative director and producer on Ragnarök. It was also during this event that it was confirmed that Ragnarök would be the finale to the Norse era. The main reason Santa Monica decided to end the Norse era with Ragnarök was due to the game's size and scale. The 2018 installment and Ragnarök each respectively took about five years to develop, and they did not want to take another five years, totaling 15 years, to tell one story. The game supports options for players to run the game in either higher resolution or better performance, including 4K at 30 frames per second (fps), 1080p resolution at 60fps, a high frame resolution mode in 4K at 40fps, and a high frame performance mode that syncs to 120 hertz. The latter two high frame options are only available for the PS5 version of the game and require monitors with HDMI 2.1. Due to the game also being on PS4, it does not fully utilize the capabilities of the PS5. The PS4 version is a visual improvement over the 2018 installment while the PS5 version "is essentially an enhancement of what's already possible [on the PS4]". The game does, however, include several features exclusive to the PS5 hardware, such as 3D audio, haptic feedback, higher frame rate, and overall better graphics. Ragnarök received free DLC in the form of an expansion pack titled Valhalla in December 2023, which serves as an epilogue and introduced roguelite gameplay. Ragnarök along with Valhalla were then ported to Windows in September 2024 with improved performance capabilities. Upon the release of the PS5 Pro in November that year, the PS5 version of Ragnarök received an enhancement patch to also utilize the performance capabilities of the updated console.

==== Future ====
Prior to the release of the 2018 installment, Cory Barlog confirmed that after the Norse era, future games could see the series tackling either Egyptian, Hindu, Chinese, Roman, or Maya mythology. He also said that although the 2018 installment (and subsequently Ragnarök) focused on Norse, it alluded to the fact that there are other mythologies co-existing in the world. Barlog also said that he liked the idea of having different directors for each game and although he may not direct another God of War, he would still be at Santa Monica to work on future games.

A game titled God of War Laufey was announced during a June 2026 State of Play with a 20-minute gameplay teaser. During Comic-Con 2026 the next month, the release date was confirmed as February 16, 2027, but it was delayed by three months to May 20 to give the developers more time to polish the game. Also at Comic-Con, Barlog confirmed that the next game after Laufey would have Kratos back as the main character with its story connecting directly to Laufey.

=== Side games ===
==== PlayStation Portable ====
Game developer Ready at Dawn pitched the idea of a God of War game for the PlayStation Portable to Santa Monica Studio soon after the original God of War launched. Cory Barlog officially confirmed the development of Chains of Olympus at a God of War II launch event, stating "It is its own story that connects to the overall story". Chains of Olympus uses a proprietary, in-house engine referred to as the Ready at Dawn engine, which expanded on the engine created for their previous game, Daxter (2006). Originally designed for the PSP's restricted 222-megahertz (MHz) processor, Ready at Dawn convinced Sony to increase the clock speed of the PSP to 333-MHz, which they did in a firmware upgrade. The faster processor allowed for more realistic blood effects, lighting effects, and shadows as well as improved enemy intelligence, but noticeably decreased battery life. After the game's completion, game director Ru Weerasuriya stated multiplayer options and other puzzles, characters, and dialogue had to be removed due to time constraints.

Ghost of Sparta was announced on May 4, 2010, on the PlayStation.Blog. According to Sony, Ready at Dawn utilized "state-of-the-art visual technologies" that allowed "higher quality environments and characters". Ghost of Sparta offers "over 25% more gameplay" than Chains of Olympus, while adding more enemies on screen and more boss encounters. Development of Ghost of Sparta took 23 months to complete. Due to Weerasuriya's schedule at Ready at Dawn, he could not return to direct; Dana Jan, the lead level designer for Chains of Olympus, became director for Ghost of Sparta. At Comic-Con 2010, Jan noted that when development began in 2008, the goal was to make the game bigger than Chains of Olympus, which had apparently pushed the PSP to its functional limits. Jan stated that Ghost of Sparta took the PSP to its "absolute capacity", with another feature being more on-screen foes. The game concept was originally used as a teaser for players who obtained the platinum trophy from God of War III. The trophy revealed a site called spartansstandtall.com, which became the official site for Ghost of Sparta on May 4. Jan stated the reason they chose to have the game take place between God of War and God of War II was because "It seemed to make a lot of sense to fill in that void".

==== 2D games ====
Betrayal was announced by Sony Online Entertainment at a press conference in Los Angeles in May 2007. Developed for mobile phones that supported Jave ME, the game utilizes a total of 110 different animations and features a 2D rendition of the series' three-dimensional (3D) graphics. Game director Phil Cohen said that although the game was enjoyable to develop, the greatest challenge was creating a single tileset and palette swapping scheme that was diverse enough to portray multiple environments with only several hundred kilobytes, and that met Santa Monica Studio's high standards. Cohen wrote the initial design document between September and October 2005, and revisited it in August 2006, the month development started. The versions for high-end handsets were completed in April 2007, with final versions for low-end handsets completed by June 2007. The porting team adapted the game to over 200 handsets in a matter of weeks. Both David Jaffe and Cory Barlog ensured that the Betrayal development team captured the feel of the combat and visual style, and were "helpful with feedback and positive support".

Sons of Sparta was officially announced during Sony's State of Play presentation on February 12, 2026, and released simultaneously that same day for the PlayStation 5 as part of the franchise's 20th-anniversary year. It was developed by Mega Cat Studios in collaboration with Santa Monica Studio. The game came about from an email that Mega Cat sent Santa Monica sometime after April 2019, as according to game director Zack Manko, Mega Cat had always wanted to develop a God of War game. Due to their specialty in retro games, one of their initial thoughts was what would God of War be like if it had come out on the PlayStation 1. In transitioning the 3D combat to 2D and making it flow smoothly, Mega Cat developed a tool that took animations from the older Greek games and converted them to 2D spreadsheets, after which, the pixel artists drew over them to create the animations. In addition to bringing back familiar enemies from the older Greek games, they also brought in newer ones but tried to keep the feel of the older games, and they also used monsters and creatures from Greek mythology that players may not be as familiar with to create the boss battles for Sons of Sparta. As players play as a Kratos in his youth, Manko said that Kratos's base kit is all about his Spartan training and how he uses his spear and shield in combat. The game was written by Matt Sophos and Richard Zangrande Gaubert, the same team behind the Norse games. According to Gaubert, in deciding when to have the story take place, it was important for them to pick a pivotal point in Kratos's life and one that players had not seen before, and it also allowed them to explore some things from Greek mythology that they had not done in the prior Greek games. Manko noted how players would see Kratos's brother Deimos and their relationship, and said it was a coming-of-age story where the brothers learn about themselves as well as what it means to be a Spartan. The game was later ported to the PS4 on November 16, 2026.

==== Canceled live-service game ====
On January 16, 2025, Bloomberg reported that Sony had canceled two unannounced live-service games that were in development. One of these projects was being developed by Bluepoint Games, the company that ported the original God of War and God of War II to the PS3 in 2009 as the God of War Collection, and also worked on Ragnarök from 2020 to 2022. Bluepoint's game that was canceled was a live-service God of War, a project that they began working on after Ragnarök. Very little details of the project have been revealed, but in October 2025, screenshots emerged online, seemingly showing a Greek setting, with reports claiming it would have incorporated Hades in some form. Bloomberg followed up in February 2026, stating that it would have involved Atreus falling into Hades, with players controlling different versions of the character battling throughout the Greek Underworld with cooperative gameplay. The report also said that at the time, Sony was fully onboard with live-service games and their hope was that this canceled God of War could have supported multiple sequels and spinoffs, similar to the Marvel Cinematic Universe.

== Adaptations ==
=== Live action ===
==== Unproduced feature film ====
A film adaptation of the first game was announced in 2005. It was produced by the Atlas Entertainment division of Mosaic Media Group. Game creator David Jaffe confirmed that a completed script had been written by David Self and would be sent to an unspecified director. He said that Universal Studios was behind the making of the God of War movie, but was unaware of its status, and later expressed doubt that the film would be made. In September 2010, Jaffe gave an update, stating that an unspecified actor had been cast as Kratos and they were "pretty good, if that ends up true". In July 2012, The Hollywood Reporter said that writers Patrick Melton and Marcus Dunstan had been hired to adapt the God of War film. The writers told IGN that they intended to "humanize" Kratos and explore his past. Melton said that they were emotionally invested and it could become a series of films, and that Ares "[would] become a more proactive villain". A script had been "turned in" and the film had a budget of US$150 million. Following the release of 2018's God of War, with no updates on the original game's film, rumors about a potential adaptation of the 2018 game began circulating. Pacific Rim: Uprising's (2018) director Steven S. DeKnight stated he would like to direct an adaptation of that game and talked with Sony about making it R-rated. In May 2021, however, a Sony spokesperson confirmed that there was no God of War film adaptation in development.

==== Amazon Prime Video series ====
On March 7, 2022, Deadline reported that a live action series was said to be in negotiations at Amazon Prime Video by Mark Fergus and Hawk Ostby, creators of The Expanse, and Rafe Judkins, the showrunner for The Wheel of Time. During an investor briefing on May 26, 2022, Sony Interactive Entertainment president Jim Ryan confirmed that a God of War television series was in development for Amazon Prime Video. The series was officially ordered on December 14, 2022, and is being produced by Sony Pictures Television and Amazon Studios in association with PlayStation Productions, and it will premiere on Prime Video in more than 240 countries and territories worldwide. Executive producers include Santa Monica Studio's Creative Director Cory Barlog, PlayStation Productions' Asad Qizilbash and Carter Swan, Santa Monica Studio's Yumi Yang, and Vertigo Entertainment's Roy Lee, with Santa Monica Studio's Jeff Ketcham serving as a co-executive producer. It was also confirmed that the Prime Video series would adapt the Norse era, beginning with the events of the 2018 installment. It was originally being written by Fergus and Ostby, with Judkins serving as showrunner, who were all also going to be executive producers. By January 2024, writing was underway. In October, however, it was reported that Fergus, Ostby, and Judkins left the project as the studios wanted to start over and go in a different direction. Prolific creator and showrunner Ronald D. Moore was then hired on as the series writer, showrunner, and as an executive producer. Ryan Hurst, who voiced Thor in God of War Ragnarök, was initially cast as Kratos and young actor Callum Vinson was cast as Atreus. Hurst got injured during filming, requiring the studios to recast due to his estimated recovery time. Other cast members include Teresa Palmer as Sif, Max Parker as Heimdall, Ólafur Darri Ólafsson as Thor, Mandy Patinkin as Odin, Ed Skrein as Baldur, Jeff Gulka as Sindri, Danny Woodburn as Brok, and Alastair Duncan reprising his role as Mímir from the games. The series officially entered production on February 27, 2026, with Amazon revealing a first look image of Hurst and Vinson as Kratos and Atreus.

=== Documentaries ===
God of War: Unearthing the Legend (75 minutes, 2010) is a documentary about the Greek era of the God of War franchise and is hosted by Peter Weller. The production discusses the relationship between the God of War games and Greek mythology, and features members of the God of War III development team and professional historians. It was included as part of the God of War III Ultimate Edition (North America) and Ultimate Trilogy Edition (Europe, Australia, and New Zealand) packages. On March 25, 2010, it was released on the PlayStation Store in North America to purchase.

God of War – Game Directors Live (80 minutes, 2010) is a documentary featuring five game directors of the Greek era of the God of War series: David Jaffe (original God of War), Cory Barlog (just God of War II at the time), Ru Weerasuriya (Chains of Olympus), Stig Asmussen (God of War III), and Dana Jan (Ghost of Sparta). The documentary takes the form of an interview panel hosted by G4's Alison Haislip, with the five game directors, 150 members of PlayStation.Blog, and members of GodofWar.com and SpartansStandTall.com. It was filmed at the El Portal theater in Los Angeles on September 1, 2010, and was released as a pre-order bonus for Ghost of Sparta in North America on November 2, 2010, and was included with the Origins Collection and later released on the PlayStation Store.

Raising Kratos is a YouTube documentary of Santa Monica Studio's five-year process in making 2018's God of War, showing the "herculean effort" that went into reviving the franchise. The documentary was announced on April 20, 2019, the one year anniversary of the game's launch, and was released the following month on May 10.

=== Comic series and novels ===
A six-issue comic book series titled God of War, written by Marv Wolfman with art by Andrea Sorrentino, was published by WildStorm and DC Comics on a bi-monthly schedule from March 2010 to January 2011. Taking place during the Greek era, the narrative switches between Kratos' past prior to Ascension and present just after the original God of War; it occurs while he is a soldier of Sparta and involves his search for the Ambrosia of Asclepius, which has legendary healing properties and eventually saved his plague-ridden daughter, Calliope. Kratos also embarks upon a quest to destroy the same elixir to deny it to the worshippers of the slain god Ares, who wish to resurrect him. The series was collected into a trade paperback in March 2011.

In the lead up to Ascension's release, Santa Monica released a graphic novel titled God of War: Rise of the Warrior on the God of War website that featured a social experience from October 2012 until March 2013. The graphic novel was a prequel story that tied into the single-player of Ascension, and was the backstory of the player's multiplayer character.

A two-volume comic series was published by Dark Horse Comics and follows Kratos' journey between the events of God of War III and the 2018 installment. It was written by Chris Roberson with art by Tony Parker. The first volume, also titled God of War, was published monthly from November 2018 to February 2019; Issue #0 was included digitally with the three different special editions of the 2018 game and the four-issue volume serves as a direct prequel story to the game. It shows Kratos trying to put his past life as a god behind him and live a quiet life with his family. The second volume, also four issues and subtitled Fallen God, was published monthly from March to June 2021; it was originally to begin publication in June 2020, but was delayed due to the COVID-19 pandemic. Taking place before the first volume, Fallen God covers the timespan from God of War III to that first volume, showing Kratos' journey from Greece to Egypt and finally Scandinavia. Both series were collected as trade paperbacks in May 2019 (Volume 1) and December 2021 (Volume 2), respectively.

The God of War novels recount the events of the games and offer deeper insights into their stories. God of War, the official novelization of the first game, was written by Matthew Stover and Robert E. Vardeman. It was published on May 25, 2010, by Del Rey Books. God of War II, the second novelization of the series, was written by Vardeman alone and was published by Del Rey Books on February 12, 2013. The third novelization in the series, titled God of War – The Official Novelization, is of 2018's God of War, skipping a novelization of God of War III. It was released on August 28, 2018, by Titan Books and was written by Cory Barlog's father, James Barlog.

=== Tabletop card game ===
An official tabletop card game titled God of War: The Card Game was released by CMON Limited on October 25, 2019. Created by Alexandru Olteanu and Fel Barros, the card game adapts the events of the 2018 installment. Players take on the role of the Norns, the Fates of Norse mythology, as they try to prevent Ragnarök with a different combination of characters and events from the game, providing many variations to completing the card game.

== Music ==
Eight God of War soundtracks have been commercially released and have featured several composers, including Gerard K. Marino, Ron Fish, Winifred Phillips, Mike Reagan, Cris Velasco, Winnie Waldron, Marcello De Francisci, Jeff Rona, Tyler Bates, and Bear McCreary. On March 1, 2005, God of War: Original Soundtrack from the Video Game was released on CD by SIE as an exclusive product for the Sony Connect Music Store. It was praised for its well-developed orchestral themes, and the creative use of ancient and ethnic instrumentation. The composers were also praised for avoiding the production of never-ending action themes. God of War II: Original Soundtrack from the Video Game was released on CD by SIE on April 10, 2007. Praised as strong, the album features ominous orchestral pieces, and each composer's contributions were cited as being slightly more distinctive than the previous soundtrack. God of War III: Original Soundtrack from the Video Game was released on CD by SIE and Sumthing Else on March 30, 2010. It was also included as downloadable content in the God of War III Ultimate Edition and Ultimate Trilogy Edition collections. The soundtrack was praised as an orchestral success and the best score in the series at the time.

The original scores for God of War, God of War II, and God of War III were nominated for Best Original Score at the 2005, 2007, and 2010 Spike Video Game Awards, respectively. The God of War Trilogy Soundtrack was included with the God of War III Ultimate Edition and Ultimate Trilogy Edition collections as downloadable content. The Trilogy Soundtrack consists of the original scores for God of War, God of War II, and God of War III. It was praised by critics as the best way to experience the series' musical development at the time, and allows the listener to note the development of the composers during the series.

On October 18, 2010, God of War: Ghost of Sparta – Original Soundtrack from the Video Game was released on the iTunes Store by SIE. It was also included as downloadable content as part of the Ghost of Sparta pre-order package and includes three previously unreleased tracks from Chains of Olympus. Several tracks were cited as being intended for purely contextual purposes, and the remaining tracks rated well in comparison to the soundtracks of the main installments in the series. God of War: Ascension (Original Soundtrack) differed from the previously released soundtracks as it was composed by Tyler Bates alone, and is the only God of War score that he has worked on. It was released on March 5, 2013, on iTunes by SIE and La-La Land Records. It was included as downloadable content in the God of War: Ascension–Collector's Edition and Special Edition. Reviewers praised it for being powerful, rich, and pulsing, though felt it was repetitive at times.

For both God of War (2018) and God of War Ragnarök, famed TV series composer Bear McCreary was employed to compose the music. God of War (PlayStation Soundtrack) was released on April 20, 2018, by Sony Classical Records. McCreary composed completely new music for the game, not reusing any music from the Greek era. However, he was inspired by their sounds, such as "deep choirs, pounding drums, and shrieking brass", and reinvented them for the Nordic setting using Nordic ethnic instruments. The soundtrack was well received, receiving various nominations at award shows as well as winning the award for Outstanding Achievement in Original Music Composition at the 22nd Annual D.I.C.E. Awards. God of War Ragnarök (Original Soundtrack) was released on November 9, 2022, by Sony Classical Records. Faroese singer Eivør was brought back to contribute to the soundtrack. Irish folk artist Hozier was also featured on the song, "Blood Upon the Snow". McCreary, along with Sam Ewing and Omer Ben-Zvi from McCreary's own record label, would also compose the music for Ragnarök's expansion, Valhalla, incorporating Gerard Marino's main themes from the Greek games. With five new tracks, God of War Ragnarök: Valhalla (Original Soundtrack) was released digitally on December 15, 2023, through Sony Classical.

For God of War's 20th anniversary, all previously released soundtracks, as well as music from Chains of Olympus, were packaged into a 20th Anniversary Vinyl Collection, which released in October 2025.

Bear McCreary returned to compose the music for the side game, Sons of Sparta. It was released digitally by Sony as part of the Digital Deluxe Edition of the game on February 12, 2026. Due to its setting taking place before the prior Greek games, he composed original music for the game and looked to Greek folk music as inspiration, using ancient Greek instruments, and combined these sounds with chiptunes of retro style games as well as utilizing a full symphony and choir.

=== God of War: Blood & Metal ===
God of War: Blood & Metal

EP by various artists
- Released: March 2, 2010
- Genre: Heavy metal
- Length: 29:24 (6-track version); 36:56 (7-track version)
- Label: Roadrunner Records

God of War: Blood & Metal is a heavy metal homage by various bands on the Roadrunner Records label, and features original music inspired by the Greek era of the God of War video game series. The EP was released for purchase on March 2, 2010, and is available from ShockHound and the iTunes Store. It was also included as downloadable content in the God of War III Ultimate Edition and Ultimate Trilogy Edition collections, which included a bonus track. The second track, "Shattering the Skies Above" by Trivium, and the bonus track, "Even Gods Cry" by The Turtlenecks, were made into music videos. 1UP.com (2.5/5) said, "it's not offensive to [the] ears" and "mainstream listeners may enjoy [the album]". Square Enix Music Online (8/10) stated the album is a "good selection of metal music" and listeners will be "surprised with the variety of music".

Track listing

No.	Title	Length
1.	"My Obsession" (Killswitch Engage)	3:45
2.	"Shattering the Skies Above" (Trivium)	4:42
3.	"Raw Dog" (Dream Theater)	7:34
4.	"This is Madness" (Taking Dawn)	4:16
5.	"The Throat of Winter" (Opeth)	5:46
6.	"The End" (Mutiny Within)	3:19
Total length:		29:24

Bonus track
No.	Title	Length
7.	"Even Gods Cry" (The Turtlenecks)	7.32
Total length:		36:56

== Critical reception ==
Aggregate review scores As of February 18, 2026.
Game	Metacritic
God of War (2005)	94/100
God of War II	93/100
God of War: Betrayal	90/100
God of War: Chains of Olympus	91/100
God of War Collection	91/100 (PS3); 73/100 (Vita)
God of War III	92/100
God of War: Ghost of Sparta	86/100
God of War: Origins Collection	84/100
God of War Saga	N/A
God of War: Ascension	80/100
God of War III Remastered	81/100
God of War (2018)	94/100 (PS4); 93/100 (PC)
God of War Ragnarök	94/100 (PS5); 90/100 (PC)
God of War Ragnarök: Valhalla	88/100 (PS5); N/A(PS4); N/A (PC)
God of War Sons of Sparta	64/100

With physical and digital copies combined, the God of War franchise has sold an estimated 66+ million games worldwide (as of November 2023). According to former Santa Monica employee Aaron Kaufman, the God of War franchise is Sony's most profitable brand. God of War (2005), God of War II, Chains of Olympus, God of War Collection, God of War III, God of War (2018), and Ragnarök each received critical acclaim from several reviewers as compiled by review aggregator Metacritic, with the 2005, 2018, and Ragnarök titles being tied for the highest score in the franchise at 94/100. Betrayal, Ghost of Sparta, and Ascension only received generally favorable reception, while Sons of Sparta had a mixed reception, having the lowest score in the series from Metacritic (64/100).

At the time of its release, Raymond Padilla of GameSpy wrote that the original God of War was the "best action game ever to grace the PS2". Other critics similarly said that it was one of the best action games of all time; it received over a dozen "Game of the Year" awards, including "Overall Game of the Year" at the 9th Annual Interactive Achievement Awards. In 2009, it was named the "seventh-best" PlayStation 2 game of all time on IGN's "Top 25 PS2 Games of All Time" list. God of War II was also on IGN's list, and was named the "second-best" PlayStation 2 game of all time. God of War II was similarly called one of the best action games of all time and is considered the swan song of the PlayStation 2 era. In November 2012, Complex.com named God of War II the best PlayStation 2 game of all time—where God of War was named the 11th best—and consider it better than its successor, God of War III. Betrayal was acclaimed for its fidelity to the series in terms of gameplay, art style, and graphics.

Chains of Olympus was praised for "fantastic" graphics and "tight and responsive" controls for the PSP at the time. In 2008, IGN awarded Chains of Olympus the "Best PSP Action Game", the Academy of Interactive Arts & Sciences awarded it with "Hand-Held Game of the Year" during the 12th Annual Interactive Achievement Awards, and was listed as the best PSP game by GamePro in September 2010. God of War III received praise for its graphics, in particular of Kratos; at the time, IGN stated that Kratos was "perhaps the single most impressive-looking character ever in videogames." IGN also said that, at the time, God of War III "redefines what the word 'scale' means with regards to videogames, as it throws you into scenes with Titans that are larger than entire levels in some other games". God of War III received awards for "Most Anticipated Game of 2010" and "Best PS3 Game" at the 2009 and 2010 Spike Video Game Awards, respectively. The game also won the "Artistic Achievement" award at the 2011 BAFTA awards. Ghost of Sparta was praised for its graphics and story, with Chris Pereira of 1UP saying that it was "a more personal story than the [previous] GOW games". It received several awards at E3 2010, including "Best Handheld Game", "Best PSP Game", and "PSP Game of Show", and won "Best Handheld Game" at the 2010 Spike Video Game Awards, as well as "Portable Game of the Year" at the 14th Annual Interactive Achievement Awards. 2018's God of War received particular praise for its art direction, graphics, combat system, music, story, use of Norse mythology, characters, and cinematic feeling. Many also felt that it had successfully revitalized the series without losing the core identity of its predecessors. It won several awards, among which were "Game of the Year" and "Best Game Direction" at The Game Awards 2018, "Best Storytelling" and "PlayStation Game of the Year" at the 2018 Golden Joystick Awards, and "Game of the Year" and "Outstanding Achievement in Game Direction" at the 22nd Annual D.I.C.E. Awards. In 2025, Rolling Stone ranked it #39 on their "50 Greatest Video Games of All Time" list.

The series has also received criticism because of problems with puzzles, weapons, and technical issues. Chains of Olympus was criticized by G4, who stated that the game "occasionally suffers from screen tearing and framerate drops", and that some of the puzzles "are so maddeningly difficult to solve". The game was also criticized for its lack of variety in enemies, its continued use of puzzles that require players to move boxes, and its relatively short story. God of War III also received some criticism. GameFront's Phil Hornshaw said it had an overly cruel protagonist, and the game assumed that the players reveled in the misery and violence as much as Kratos did. IGN complained about the game's weapons, and said "that two of the three additional weapons that you'll earn are extremely similar to your blades. They have unique powers and slightly different moves, but by and large, they're more of the same". Ghost of Sparta received criticism from Eurogamer, which said that the "game's primary problem ... is in its in-built focus" and that "there is a sense that Ghost of Sparta is a step back for the series if you've played [God of War III]". Some reviewers stated that Ascension's story was not as compelling as previous installments, with IGN stating that in comparison to Zeus and Ares, "the Furies don't quite cut it". The multiplayer received a mixed response. Although reviewers claimed gameplay translated well into the multiplayer, they were critical of the balance and depth of combat. Edge magazine approved of the multiplayer, stating it was an "evolutionary step" with "some fine ideas ... that [would] form part of this genre's future template". The 2018 installment received some criticism, for example, a couple of reviewers disliked that the fast travel option unlocked very late into the game.

The collections have also received praise. IGN (9.4/10) awarded God of War Collection (PS3) the "Editor's Choice" Award and praised the enhanced resolutions, lower price point and smoother frame rates, and stated it was the "definitive way to play the game[s]". Due to the success of God of War Collection, Sony announced that further PlayStation titles would receive similar treatment for release under its new "Classics HD" brand. The Origins Collection was similarly well received. IGN (9/10) stated "Sony succeeded at making good games better", although GamePro criticized it for its lack of new bonus content. God of War Saga also received praise. Ryan Fleming of Digital Trends wrote that the collection "is perhaps the best value buy for any console available", although the collection is not likely for fans of the series, but rather inexperienced players or newcomers. God of War III Remastered was met with generally favorable reception. Praise was given to the smoother textures and improved frame rate, though because the original already had remarkable graphics, the changes were not major, and reviewers said these changes were not a strong enough argument to rebuy the game for US$40.

== See also ==
- Characters of God of War
- Kratos (God of War)
