= UniWar =

2009 video game

- Developer(s): Javaground
- Publisher(s): Javaground
- Platform(s): Android iPhone
- Release: April 2009
- Genre(s): Strategy
- Mode(s): Single-player, Multiplayer

UniWar is a video game for mobile devices, initially released in 2009 for Android and iOS. It is a turn-based strategy game with multiplayer online gameplay as well as a single-player campaign mode.

== Gameplay ==
Uniwar is a turn-based strategy game with multiplayer online gameplay for up to eight players as well as a single-player campaign mode. The game takes place on a hexagonal map, where each player moves their units. Each side's goal is to capture all of their opponents' bases. For each base a player controls, he/she earns additional credits which can be spent constructing units such as tanks and helicopters. The game consists of twenty-one single-player levels and three armies: Sapians (humans), Titans (machines), and Khralians (aliens).

== Release ==
The game was released in April 2009.

== Reception ==
Reception

Review scores
Publication	Score
IGN	8/10
Pocket Gamer	4/5

IGN said "If you like games like Advance Wars, Military Madness, or StarCraft, there really is no reason not to jump on UniWar".

PocketGamer said "Those hoping for a high-octane polygon-tossing extravaganza will be disappointed, but beneath UniWar’s sterile exterior thumps the heart of fiery field commander".
