= God of War: Betrayal =

2007 mobile game

- Developers: Javaground; SOE Los Angeles
- Publisher: Sony Pictures Digital
- Director: Philip Cohen
- Producer: Philip Cohen
- Designers: Philip Cohen; Nathan Leland; Alan Barasch
- Writer: Marianne Krawczyk
- Series: God of War
- Platform: Java Platform, Micro Edition (Java ME)
- Release: June 20, 2007
- Genres: Hack and slash; action-adventure
- Mode: Single-player

God of War: Betrayal is a 2007 action-adventure mobile game developed by Javaground and Sony Online Entertainment's (SOE) Los Angeles division, and published by Sony Pictures Digital. Released for mobile phones supporting the Java Platform, Micro Edition (Java ME) on June 20, 2007, it is the third installment in the God of War series, and the sixth chronologically. Loosely based on Greek mythology, Betrayal is set in ancient Greece with vengeance as its central motif. The player controls the protagonist Kratos, who became the new God of War after killing the former, Ares. Kratos is framed for the murder of Argos and pursues the true assassin across Greece, resulting in a confrontation with Olympian messenger Ceryx.

Betrayal was the first installment in the series to be released on a non-PlayStation platform, and also the only to never be released on any PlayStation platform, and it was also the first to be presented as a two-dimensional (2D) side-scrolling game. Despite the limitations of the mobile platform, in comparison to its home console counterparts, it retains the action-oriented approach of its predecessors, with the same combination of combo-based combat, platforming, and puzzle game elements. Although God of War is primarily a home console series, Betrayal was praised for its fidelity to the series in terms of gameplay, art style, and graphics: "the real deal third game in the killer franchise". It received awards for "Wireless Game of the Month" (June 2007) and "Best Platform Game" (wireless) of 2007.

== Gameplay ==
The game's 2D rendition of the series' 3D graphics featuring Kratos (left) attacking a minotaur and a dead rider. The HUD in the upper left corner shows the player's Health (green) and Magic (blue) Meters. The red dot with the number 10 indicates the number of red orbs collected.

God of War: Betrayal is a two-dimensional side-scrolling game. It retains the action-oriented approach of its predecessors, with the player controlling the character Kratos in the same combination of combat, platforming, and puzzle game elements. Platforming elements include jumping across chasms, climbing ladders, and swinging on ropes. Some puzzles require Kratos to move a box on top of a switch (thus activating it), or moving a box to use it as a jumping-off point to reach a pathway unreachable with normal jumping. Game length is approximately two to four hours, and it consists of ten levels.

Kratos retains his main weapon of the previous installments, the Blades of Athena: a pair of blades attached to chains that are wrapped around the character's wrists and forearms. In gameplay, the blades can be swung offensively in various maneuvers. Kratos utilizes the magical abilities Medusa's Gaze and Army of Hades acquired in the original God of War, as well as the secondary weapon, the Blade of Artemis, with each offering alternative combat options, giving him a variety of ways to attack and kill enemies (e.g., Medusa's Gaze briefly turns enemies to stone). Foes encountered in Betrayal primarily stem from Greek mythology, including Gorgons, minotaurs, and cerberuses, as well as those created for the game, such as the humanoid minions of the god Hades, including dead riders and undead legionnaires. In addition to the main gameplay, Betrayal includes a bonus "Arena Mode" where players must kill a certain number of enemies without dying before gaining access to the Arena's upper levels.

== Synopsis ==
=== Setting and characters ===
As with the previous games in the God of War franchise, God of War: Betrayal is set in an alternate version of ancient Greece, populated by the Olympian gods and other beings of Greek mythology. Events are set between those of the games Ghost of Sparta (2010) and God of War II (2007). The protagonist is Kratos, a former Captain of Sparta's army who became the new God of War after killing his predecessor, Ares. Other characters include Argos, the giant pet of the goddess Hera; an unknown assassin; and the Olympian messenger Ceryx, the son of Hermes and main antagonist. Zeus, the King of the Gods, is an unseen character.

=== Plot ===
Kratos is leading the Spartan army in a rampage across Greece. During the campaign, he is attacked by a number of beasts led by Argos, who was sent by the gods to stop Kratos. After a series of skirmishes, Argos is killed by an unknown assassin, who frames Kratos in an attempt to turn the gods against him. The Spartan pursues his foe across Greece to discover the identity of the assassin, but is slowed by constant attacks from the minions of Hades, the God of the Underworld. Zeus sends Ceryx to deliver a message to Kratos: stop the relentless pursuit and take heed of the destruction already caused. Kratos, however, battles and kills Ceryx, which inadvertently allows the assassin to escape. Kratos then realizes his actions have further alienated the gods, and Zeus will soon act in response to his defiance.

== Development ==
God of War: Betrayal was announced by Sony Online Entertainment at a press conference in Los Angeles, California in May 2007. The game utilizes a total of 110 different animations and features a 2D rendition of the series' three dimensional (3D) graphics. The character art and animation were done by WayForward Technologies, who were contracted by Javaground, who then revised and implemented it all. The only audio components are an orchestral score in the main menu and background sounds (e.g., clashing weapons).

Phil Cohen, the producer, designer, and game director for Betrayal, said that although developing the game was enjoyable, the greatest challenge was creating a single tileset and palette swapping scheme that was diverse enough to portray multiple environments with only several hundred kilobytes, and that met series creator Santa Monica Studio's high standards. He wrote the initial design document between September and October 2005, and revisited it in August 2006, the month development started. The versions for high-end handsets were completed in April 2007, with final versions for low-end handsets completed by June 2007. The porting team adapted the game to over 200 handsets in a matter of weeks.

Cohen stated that one challenge was capturing the feel of God of War's visual look and gameplay design, given the limited processing power and memory on most handsets at the time—complicating puzzle design, traps, environment interaction, and enemy behavior. He noted that both David Jaffe and Cory Barlog (game directors of God of War and God of War II, respectively) ensured the Betrayal development team captured the feel of the combat and visual style, and were "helpful with feedback and positive support". The team also worked closely with Eric Williams, the console game's lead combat designer. In keeping the "look and feel" true to the franchise, the Betrayal development team played the original God of War extensively to study its pacing and tricks. The development team also worked closely with Marianne Krawczyk, the writer of the Greek-based God of War console games. Krawczyk used Betrayal to bridge the events between God of War and God of War II, include additional backstory, and to explain why the relationship between the gods and Kratos had changed.

== Reception ==
Reception

Review scores
| Publication | Score |
|---|---|
| GamesRadar+ | 4/5 |
| IGN | 9.0/10 |
| Blogcritics | 5/5 |
| Pocket Gamer | 8/10 |
| Modojo | 3/5 |

Betrayal received positive reception, including praise for its fidelity to the series in terms of gameplay, art style, and graphics. Levi Buchanan of IGN called it "the real deal third game in the killer franchise". Similarly, Matt Paprocki of Blogcritics wrote, "Betrayal [was] a full-fledged extension of the God of War franchise, and it [earned] its title". He said it was "one of the best mobile games you’ll ever play", also praising its relevancy for the mobile games format at the time. In regards to violence, Chris Antista of GamesRadar stated that it was "quite possibly the goriest thing your mobile's ever seen". Although not a "revolutionary experience", Pocket Gamer's Will Freeman said "it [was] a thoroughly impressive, utterly solid release that mobile platform fans [would] relish". Modojo's Justin Davis said that while Betrayal was compelling enough to play all the way to the end, "[it did not] feel like I was having fun".

The context-sensitive attacks received praise and criticism. Antista claimed that fans would be thankful for the addition of the contextual attacks, but criticized the control limitations as the sensitivity of the cursor button could result in a failed combo, and the jump button would automatically send the player forward in the direction they were facing. Buchanan noted that the contextual attacks could be "frustratingly tricky" due to the limited input time, especially considering the small size of most handsets at the time.

Commenting on the combat, Paprocki said that despite the simplified combo system, the developers "managed to infuse the sheer brutality and force God of War [was] known for within the confines of the [mobile] platform". Because of the simplified system, situations that called for Kratos' magical abilities were rare. However, if players chose to use these abilities, selecting them was a "burden in the haste of a battle", requiring players to cycle through their entire inventory. Paprocki also criticized the lack of an autosave feature, as progress was not automatically saved in the event of receiving a phone call, which could cause "unbearable frustration". Freeman said that the combination of the weapons and quick time events made the combat "a convincing interpretation of the action in the original console games". Davis said that although there were puzzle and platforming elements, the focus was "clearly on the combat" and felt that the combat system was "a little shallow". He said it seemed as if the abundance of enemies "[existed] solely to act as punching (or slicing, as it were) bags for Kratos".

=== Awards ===
IGN named Betrayal "Wireless Game of the Month" for June 2007. In their Best of 2007 – Wireless Awards, they named it the "Best Platform Game".

== See also ==
- 2007 in video gaming
