= Javaground =

Mobile game industry services provider

- Type: Private
- Industry: Mobile Game Development and Mobile Development/Porting Tools
- Founded: 2001
- Defunct: March 2010
- Headquarters: Irvine, California, U.S
- Key people: Alexander Kral, Xavier Kral
- Products: Games: 2012: Apocalypse, The Inferno, Angels and Demons, UniWar (iPhone), Jeopardy! (iPhone), Blood+, Wheel of Fortune (iPhone), Quantum of Solace, James Bond Top Agent, Jeopardy! Deluxe, Wheel of Fortune Deluxe, Spider-Man 3 Puzzle, God of War: Betrayal, Spider-Man 3 Action, Snoop Dogg Cruisin', Fish n' Tunes, James Bond: Casino Royale, and more Tools (Xpress Suite): Resource Manager, Level Editor, Universal Emulator, Porting Engine, and Avancys; Mobile Marketplace: Xpressed.com
- Website: Javaground Official Web Site

Javaground was an American provider of a suite of development and porting tools for the mobile games industry called the Xpress Suite. The company was also a developer of mobile games. Javaground's Xpress Suite was noted for its set of automated converters, which were used to create games for a range of platforms including the iPhone, Windows Mobile, Android, BREW, and Flash, from a single set of Java ME source code.

Due to financial stresses the company closed in March 2010, and the website has been unavailable since sometime early in 2011.

== Javaground Games ==
In addition to numerous game porting projects, Javaground has completed the following original mobile games, most of which have been published by Sony Online Entertainment:

- 2012: Apocalypse (2009)
- The Inferno (2009)
- Angels and Demons – iTunes App Store (2009)
- Uniwar (iPhone) – iTunes App Store (2009)
- Jeopardy (iPhone) – iTunes App Store (2009)
- Blood+ (2009)
- Wheel of Fortune (iPhone) – iTunes App Store (2009)
- Quantum of Solace (2008)
- Afterworld (2008)
- Rock & Roll Jeopardy! (2008)
- Wheel of Fortune Road Trip (2008)
- James Bond Top Agent (2008)
- Jeopardy! Deluxe (2008)
- Wheel of Fortune Deluxe (2008)
- Ivan Mosecovich's Brain Waves (2007)
- Spider-Man 3 Puzzle (2007)
- God of War: Betrayal (2007)
- Spider-Man 3 Action (2007)
- Snoop Dogg Cruisin' (2007)
- Fish n' Tunes (2007)
- James Bond: Casino Royale (2006)

Some of Javaground's porting projects include:

- Ghouls 'n Ghosts – Capcom (2007)
- Q*Bert – Sony Online Entertainment (2007)
- Volfied – Taito (2007)
- Caterpillar – Tiki Games (2006)
- Elevator Action – Sony Online Entertainment (2005)
- The Legend of Zorro – Sony Online Entertainment (2005)

In mid April 2009 Javaground released their first major independent title, UniWar, which debuted on the iPhone. In less than a week it was in the list of top 10 games on the iPhone App Store, carrying a constant 4.5 star average rating for most of the week.

== Xpress Suite (Javaground's Development Tools) ==
Javaground's development tool suite, known as the Xpress Suite, consists of the following components:

=== Resource Manager ===
Resource Manager is used to create, optimize and manage assets. It is used to configure game graphics, animation sequences, palettes, fonts, and multi-lingual translations. Resource Manager offers sophisticated 2D animation capabilities, as well as graphical optimization tools used for the creation of compact game content files.

=== Level Editor ===
Game environments constructed in the Javaground Level Editor may consist of background tiles, static scenery objects, and custom movable objects such as characters and items. The level editor supports parallax scrolling and is suited for the creation of side-scrolling platformers, overhead RPGs, and isometric games.

=== Universal Emulator ===
Javaground's Universal Emulator was designed to streamline the process of testing and debugging. The application emulates a wide variety of devices, making it possible to test and debug a game without having to first install it onto a mobile phone.

=== Porting Engine ===
This tool automatically generates builds for a variety of devices and platforms from a single set of source code. Builds generated by this application are customized for the unique constraints and bugs present on each device. Javaground's conversion tools convert Java ME code into numerous target formats. Although most mobile phones sold worldwide rely on the Java standard, a significant number of service providers offer BREW based devices, in addition to Android, Windows Mobile, and the iPhone. Javaground's converters eliminate the need to develop a different set of source code for each of these platforms.

=== Database ===
The Javaground Database profiles the characteristics of a variety of mobile devices. Mobile games are often created for devices with widely varying technical capabilities, and the database assists developers by specifying which game features should be enabled on each device.

=== Avancys ===
Avancys is Javaground's provisioning server, used for maintaining information on product life cycles, variants, and localization. It is used extensively for QA operations.

== Xpressed.com ==
In early 2009 Javaground launched a new mobile game marketplace called Xpressed.com. When launched, the site already featured well over 300 unique titles from over 20 publishers. Some of the more notable features of the service are:

- The availability of downloadable demos for all games
- Web based demos for all games which can be embedded in other sites
- An option to pay a flat rate to have unlimited access to nearly all games
- and the ability for developers to come together and form new studios to publish their own games

== History and Location ==
Javaground was founded in 2001 in Brussels, Belgium by Xavier Kral. Javaground USA, Corp was based in Irvine, California since 2004. The company had offices in Imola (Italy), Montreal (Canada), Chengdu (China). Javaground USA and all its offices were closed in March 2010. Javaground's technology was acquired by Australian start-up Codengo in 2011.
