= God of War III =

2010 video game

- North American box art
- Developer: Santa Monica Studio (Note: Ported to PlayStation 4 by Wholesale Algorithms, Mercenary Technology, and Red Kite Games.)
- Publisher: Sony Computer Entertainment
- Director: Stig Asmussen
- Producer: Steve Caterson
- Designer: Todd Papy
- Programmer: Vassily Filippov
- Artist: Ken Feldman
- Writers: Marianne Krawczyk; Stig Asmussen; Ariel Lawrence; William Weissbaum
- Composers: Gerard Marino; Cris Velasco; Ron Fish; Mike Reagan; Jeff Rona
- Series: God of War
- Platforms: PlayStation 3; PlayStation 4
- Release: PlayStation 3: NA: March 16, 2010; AU: March 18, 2010; EU: March 19, 2010; PlayStation 4: NA: July 14, 2015; PAL: July 15, 2015; EU: July 17, 2015
- Genres: Action-adventure, hack and slash
- Mode: Single-player

God of War III is a 2010 action-adventure game developed by Santa Monica Studio and published by Sony Computer Entertainment. First released for the PlayStation 3 on March 16, 2010, it is the fifth installment in the God of War series, the eighth chronologically, the sequel to 2007's God of War II, and the first mainline title to be produced without the involvement of series creator David Jaffe. Loosely based on Greek mythology, the game is set in ancient Greece with vengeance as its central motif. The player controls the protagonist Kratos, the former God of War, after his betrayal at the hands of Zeus, King of the Olympian gods, whom he learned was his father. Reigniting the Great War, Kratos ascends Mount Olympus until he is abandoned by the Titan Gaia. Guided by Athena's spirit, Kratos battles monsters, gods, and Titans in a search for Pandora, without whom he cannot open Pandora's Box, defeat Zeus, and end the reign of the Olympian gods to have his revenge.

The gameplay is similar to previous installments, focusing on combo-based combat with the player's main weapon—the Blades of Exile—and secondary weapons acquired during the game. It uses quick time events, where the player acts in a timed sequence to defeat strong enemies and bosses. The player can use up to four magical attacks and a power-enhancing ability as alternative combat options, and the game features puzzles and platforming elements. Compared with previous installments, God of War III offers a revamped magic system, more enemies, new camera angles, and downloadable content.

God of War III received large critical acclaim upon release, with praise for the graphics, gameplay, and scope, although the plot received a mixed response. The game received several awards, including "Most Anticipated Game of 2010" and "Best PS3 Game" at the 2009 and 2010 Spike Video Game Awards, respectively, the "Artistic Achievement" award at the 2011 British Academy of Film and Television Arts (BAFTA) Video Game Awards, and "Outstanding Achievement in Animation" at the 2011 Interactive Achievement Awards. One of the best-selling games in the God of War series and the ninth best-selling PlayStation 3 game of all time, it sold over 5 million copies worldwide by June 2012 and was included in the God of War Saga released for PlayStation 3 on August 28, 2012.

Since its release, it has also been named as one of the greatest video games ever made. In celebration of the God of War franchise's 10th anniversary, a remastered version of the game, titled God of War III Remastered, was released for the PlayStation 4 (PS4) on July 14, 2015; as of June 2023, the remastered version has sold an estimated 4 million copies. After two more prequels were released, (Note: God of War: Ghost of Sparta in November 2010 and God of War: Ascension in March 2013.) a sequel to God of War III simply titled God of War was released on April 20, 2018, shifting the setting to Norse mythology. In 2026, a remake was announced during a State of Play presentation on February 13 by TC Carson, who portrays Kratos in the trilogy. The remake is part of the God of War Remake Trilogy, which also includes remakes of the original God of War and God of War II. At the time of the announcement, the game was in early development for the PlayStation 5.

== Gameplay ==
God of War III is an action-adventure game with hack and slash elements. It is a third-person single-player video game. As with previous installments, the player controls the character Kratos from a fixed-camera perspective in combo-based combat, platforming, and puzzle games. The enemies are an assortment of Greek mythological creatures, including centaurs, harpies, chimeras, cyclopes, satyrs, minotaurs, Sirens, cerberuses, and Gorgons. The player must also climb walls and ladders, jump across chasms, and swing on ropes to proceed through the game. The puzzles included vary in difficulty: some puzzles only require objects to be placed in a specific position, while some require timing and precision, such as a puzzle with mechanics similar to Guitar Hero. In addition to finding Gorgon Eyes and Phoenix Feathers of the previous games, Minotaur Horns are a new item to be found. Where the eyes and feathers increase the player's health and magic meters, the horns increase the items meter, which allows further use of secondary weapons, called "Items".

=== Combat ===
Kratos (left) battles boss character Hercules (right). This is an example of a QTE sequence found in all God of War games; moving the left analog stick as shown by the orange arrow will allow him to continue his attack.

Kratos' main weapon is the Blades of Exile, replacing the Blades of Athena used in previous installments and the opening moments of the game. The weapon is a pair of blades attached to chains wrapped around Kratos' wrists and forearms that can be swung in a number of maneuvers. During the game, Kratos acquires new weapons—the Claws of Hades, the Nemean Cestus, and the Nemesis Whip—with other combat options. The Nemean Cestus, a pair of gauntlets, and the Nemesis Whip, similar to the Blades of Exile, crafted by Hephaestus initially intended to use it against Kratos but Kratos somehow manages to turn it against him. These weapons are required to advance in parts of the game; for example, the Nemean Cestus is needed to break through objects composed of onyx.

Unlike in previous games, magical abilities are learned with the acquisition of a new weapon, giving each weapon its own magic attack; for example, the Army of Sparta may only be used with the Blades of Exile. Magic gives Kratos a variety of ways to attack and kill enemies, such as the Claws of Hades' Soul Summon ability, which conjures souls to attack enemies. Other magic includes the Nemean Cestus' Nemean Roar and the Nemesis Whip's Nemesis Rage. In addition to four primary weapons, three secondary ones, known as Items, are acquired: the Bow of Apollo, the Head of Helios, and the Boots of Hermes. All three are required to advance in certain stages of the game; for example, the Head of Helios can be used as a lantern in dark areas and to reveal hidden doorways.

The relics Poseidon's Trident, the Golden Fleece, and Icarus' Wings acquired in previous games are retained and used to overcome environmental obstacles, with the Golden Fleece used to deflect enemy attacks. Hades' Soul allows Kratos to swim in the River Styx. The Blade of Olympus, a primary weapon in God of War II, is used in this game with the special ability Rage of Sparta for temporary invulnerability and increased attack damage.

New additions to the gameplay include the combat grapple, a ranged-grab maneuver which, depending on the weapon, can pull Kratos towards foes or force them away—necessary at certain points in the game, with Kratos riding harpies across chasms—and a simple grab allowing him to use a weak foe as a battering ram. Kratos can now rapidly switch among the four primary weapons in battle, continuing the same attack combination. Other extra features include the addition of ten Godly Possessions, often hidden near defeated foes and providing additional abilities like unlimited magic during bonus play. The challenge mode in this game is called the Challenge of Olympus (seven trials) and is unlocked after the game's completion. This mode requires players to complete a series of specific tasks—for example, killing all enemies without weapons in a limited amount of time. The player may unlock additional rewards, such as bonus costumes for Kratos, behind-the-scenes videos, and concept art of the characters and environments, by completing the game's difficulty levels and challenge mode. A new mode, the Combat Arena, allows players to set difficulty levels and choose opponents to hone playing skills.

== Synopsis ==
=== Setting ===
As with previous games, God of War III is set in an alternate version of ancient Greece populated by Olympian gods, Titans, heroes, and other characters from Greek mythology. The events of the game are set between 2007's God of War II and 2018's God of War. The game is set across several locations on Mount Olympus, including the Tomb of Ares, the ancient city of Olympia, the Path of Eos, the Labyrinth, several areas of the Palace of the Gods, such as the Forum and Hera's Gardens, and the Underworld and Tartarus.

The Tomb of Ares—housing the former God of War's remains—and the city of Olympia lie on the sides of Mount Olympus. Just beyond the city is the Path of Eos, a hidden cavern near the foot of Olympus. The Palace of the Gods is the home of the Olympians, and features the Forum (a small coliseum), Hera's Gardens, and the chambers of Aphrodite and Poseidon. The Labyrinth is a large aerial puzzle constructed by the architect Daedalus to imprison Pandora in the Caverns of Olympus, home of Skorpius and its offspring. The Underworld, ruled by Hades and divided by the River Styx, is the realm of the dead. Hades' palace contains the remains of his wife, Persephone, whom Kratos killed in Chains of Olympus. The Underworld is also home to statues of the three Judges of the Underworld, who hold the Chain of Balance connecting the Underworld to Olympus. Tartarus is the prison of the dead where the Titan Cronos was banished after Kratos retrieved Pandora's Box from Pandora's Temple in 2005's God of War.

=== Characters ===
Kratos (voiced by Terrence C. Carson), the protagonist of the game, is a Spartan demigod warrior who became the God of War after killing Ares and seeks revenge on Zeus for his betrayal. Other characters include Greek gods such as Athena (Erin Torpey), the Goddess of Wisdom and Kratos' mentor and ally; Zeus (Corey Burton), King of the Gods, Kratos' father and the primary antagonist; Poseidon (Gideon Emery), God of the Sea; Hades (Clancy Brown), God of the Underworld; Hephaestus (Rip Torn), the Smith God; Hermes (Greg Ellis), Messenger of the Gods and the God of Speed and Commerce; Helios (Crispin Freeman), the Sun God; Hera (Adrienne Barbeau), Queen of the Gods who controls plant life; and Aphrodite (April Stewart), Goddess of Love and Sexuality. Several Titans are featured, including Gaia (Susan Blakeslee), Cronos (George Ball), Epimetheus, Oceanus, and Perses. Other characters include Hercules (Kevin Sorbo), a demigod and Kratos' half-brother; the architect Daedalus (Malcolm McDowell), Icarus' father; and Pandora (Natalie Lander), Hephaestus's artificial daughter. Minor characters include the three Judges of the Underworld: King Minos (Mark Moseley), King Rhadamanthus, and King Aeacus; Peirithous (Simon Templeman), an Underworld prisoner in love with Persephone, and Kratos' wife and daughter: Lysandra (Gwendoline Yeo) and Calliope (Debi Derryberry), who appear in a plot sequence in which Kratos journeys through his own psyche.

=== Plot ===
Kratos, Gaia, and the other Titans ascend Mount Olympus to destroy the Olympian gods. (Note: Continuing immediately after God of War II) Poseidon launches an assault against them, but is killed by Kratos, causing the oceans to flood Greece. Reaching Olympus' peak, they attempt to attack Zeus, but he knocks them off the mountain with his lightning bolt. As Gaia clings to the mountainside, she refuses to save Kratos, deeming him a pawn for the Titans' revenge.

Kratos falls into the River Styx, where he loses the Blade of Olympus before the souls of the Underworld weaken him and ruin the Blades of Athena. Climbing from the river, he is greeted by Athena's spirit, who ascended to a higher existence after sacrificing herself to save Zeus from Kratos, (Note: As depicted in God of War II) and had witnessed truths which she previously could not see. She gives Kratos the Blades of Exile and tells him he must extinguish the Flame of Olympus to kill Zeus. After finding the three Judges of the Underworld and the Chain of Balance, Kratos briefly meets the spirit of Pandora, whom he initially mistakes for his dead daughter, Calliope. Following an encounter with the Olympian blacksmith Hephaestus and recovering the Blade of Olympus, he kills Hades and releases the souls of the Underworld. Kratos considers searching for Calliope's soul, but Athena reminds him of his quest, and he leaves the Underworld. Kratos reaches Olympia and finds Gaia pleading for help, only for Kratos to sever her arm as payback for her earlier betrayal, causing her to fall to her apparent death.

Kratos (bottom left) battles enemies on Cronos' arm. The image also depicts the size of the Titans featured in the game.

Kratos continues his ascent, murdering powerful foes such as the Titan Perses and the Sun God Helios, plunging Greece into eternal darkness in the process. He pursues the overconfident Hermes to the Chamber of the Flame and finds that Pandora's Box is held within the Flame of Olympus, which Athena says can only be quelled by Pandora herself. Kratos then catches and kills Hermes, releasing a plague upon Greece. At the Forum, he has an audience with the drunken Hera, who ignores his request for Pandora's location and summons Hercules, whom Kratos offers a chance to step aside from his war to no avail. After discussing his jealousy of his half-brother, Hercules duels with Kratos, but Kratos gains the upper hand and kills him. Kratos then encounters Aphrodite, who is indifferent to his war on Olympus. She leads him back to her estranged husband, Hephaestus, through Hyperion's Gate. The blacksmith, learning of Kratos' plan to quell the Flame of Olympus, sends him to Tartarus to retrieve the Omphalos Stone, claiming he will forge a new weapon for the Spartan. Kratos encounters Cronos, kills the Titan for the stone, and returns to Hephaestus. After forging the weapon, Hephaestus tries to kill Kratos, but is impaled by his own anvil. Before dying, Hephaestus admits that he was trying to protect his daughter Pandora, who was imprisoned in the Labyrinth after Kratos opened her box, (Note: As depicted in the first God of War game) and pleads with Kratos to spare her. Reusing the Hyperion Gate, Kratos travels through Hera's Garden, where he kills Hera for insulting Pandora, ending all Greek plant life, before making his way to the Labyrinth.

The imprisoned architect, Daedalus, distraught to learn of his son Icarus' death, dies as Kratos proceeds to unite the Labyrinth and venture through the aerial puzzle to rescue Pandora. Neutralizing the judges and breaking the Chain of Balance, Kratos raises the Labyrinth, and Pandora tries to enter the Flame. Zeus intervenes and fights Kratos, but Pandora sacrifices herself despite Kratos' reluctance. Finding Pandora's Box empty, Kratos attacks Zeus before Gaia joins the fray and attempts to kill them both. They escape through an open wound on her body and continue their battle inside her chest. Kratos impales Zeus against Gaia's heart with the Blade of Olympus, killing her and apparently Zeus. Believing Zeus to be dead, Kratos leaves but is attacked by Zeus' astral form, who rids him of his weapons and powers. Before Zeus can finish him off, Kratos is saved by a vision of Pandora during a journey into his psyche. With the help from the spirits of Calliope and his wife Lysandra, Kratos forgives himself before regaining consciousness along with the power of hope. He forces Zeus' spirit back into his body and then beats him to death.

Kratos looks upon an apocalyptic Greece in complete chaos. Athena reappears, demanding that Kratos return what she thinks he took from Pandora's Box. When Kratos tells her it was empty, she refuses to believe this, explaining that when Zeus sealed the evils of the world in the box after the Great War, she placed the power of hope in it as well, foreseeing that it would eventually be opened. Athena then realizes that when Kratos opened the box to defeat Ares, the evils escaped and slowly corrupted the gods while Kratos was imbued with hope, which had been hidden by the guilt and failures of his past. She demands Kratos to return the power of hope with the intention of establishing her own rule over Greece. Kratos refuses and seemingly kills himself with the Blade of Olympus so that hope can be distributed among mankind. A disappointed Athena leaves empty-handed while Kratos collapses on a mural of a phoenix.

In a post-credits scene, a trail of blood is seen leading away from the mural and the Blade of Olympus, implying Kratos' survival. (Note: As depicted in the 2018 God of War game)

== Development ==
In a 2007 interview with GameTrailers, God of War creator and game director David Jaffe explained his original intention for the series, which is different from the actual ending of God of War III, which was based on game director Stig Asmussen's vision. Jaffe's idea was that "God of War explains, or ultimately will explain, why there are no more Greek myths". He said that it would have been "hell on earth" as the gods and Titans battled each other for domination. Other mythological pantheons would have become involved after Kratos killed Zeus and the other Greek gods, and the result would be that humankind no longer believed in the gods—according to Jaffe, the only way a god can truly die. God of War III was first mentioned by God of War II game director Cory Barlog at a God of War II launch event. Barlog said that the game would have full 1080p HD resolution (changed to 720p in final release) and support Sixaxis tilt and vibration functions. Announced before the DualShock 3 controller was introduced, this caused confusion since the Sixaxis controller does not support rumble. During the 2009 Game Developers Conference (GDC), the creative team said that the Sixaxis tilt capability had been removed because they "could not find a suitable situation to use Sixaxis in the game effectively".

After the first eight months of development, Barlog left Santa Monica for other opportunities, and Stig Asmussen took over as game director; Asmussen previously served as lead environment artist and art director on God of War and God of War II, respectively. In an interview with IGN, Asmussen said that Barlog "had a major impact on the game" and although he had left the team, they spoke several times afterwards and "bounced a few ideas off him," but there was no formal collaboration. He also said that David Jaffe "[had] been around the studio a few times" and they "[had] gone over some high-level stuff with him to get his observations and feedback." Early in development when Barlog was still with the team, he expressed interest in a cooperative mode "if we can do something unique with it". In November 2009, Asmussen told GamePro that although a multiplayer option had been discussed, it was unsuitable for God of War III: "There's a story we want to tell and an experience we want to deliver, and multi-player doesn't fit into that." By December 2009, the game was in its final developmental stages.

In December 2008, Sony reported that God of War III would be the last game in the series. However, in January 2010 John Hight told Joystiq: "While God of War III will conclude the trilogy, it won't spell the end of the franchise ... We're going to be really careful about what we do next". Asmussen mentioned the possibility of downloadable content; the game would be shipped with the regular challenge mode, and new challenge modes might be released as downloadable content to maintain the series. In March 2009, it was reported that Sony was seeking opinions about a collector's edition from PlayStation 3 owners. In October, an Ultimate Edition was unveiled for North America, and an Ultimate Trilogy Edition was announced soon afterwards for a limited European, Australian, and New Zealand release. A Trilogy Edition was announced for Japan, where the Computer Entertainment Rating Organization (CERO) gave the game an adults-only Z rating after the previous two versions were considered suitable for players 17 and older.

=== Technical ===
Asmussen said that one of the greatest challenges in developing God of War III for the PlayStation 3 was the "complexity of everything"; individual tasks, such as designing Helios' decapitation, could take a year because the "level of detail [that was] expected [was] so high and intricate, it [crossed] multiple departments." He said that the PlayStation 3's hardware capabilities allowed more flexibility in character creation and interaction with the environment. The character model for Kratos in the PlayStation 2 (PS2) games used about 5,000 polygons; the PS3 model was about 20,000 – a high number, but less than that used by other models such as Nathan Drake in Uncharted 2: Among Thieves, who used 35,000. Ken Feldman, the art director, commented that the polygon count was not the only factor, and cited the increased texture detail as one of the reasons for Kratos' realistic appearance. The developers used a new technique called blended normal mapping to add realism to the basic model and hugely enhance the range of animation available (e.g., muscle movement, including visible veins, and facial animations). All of the main protagonists were animated by hand because the animators produced more effective work than basic motion capture, though the voice actors' facial movements were recorded by Image Metrics's performance capture system. For animating things like hair, the animators created a secondary animation code, known as Dynamic Simulation, which allows the PS3 itself to mathematically calculate the way it should look; it accurately generates motion that previously took the animators long hours to replicate.

The engine for God of War III was from the first two installments. Santa Monica senior producer Steve Caterson said that the development team ported God of War II's engine to the PlayStation 3 and were able to quickly play the game. Everything that Kratos could do in previous games, he could do on the PlayStation 3, which allowed the developers to immediately begin designing new content. As the game was being developed, the code department would swap out PlayStation 2 components with PlayStation 3 components. They replaced the renderer, the particle system, and the collision system. Feldman said that although they were re-using the engine from God of War II, the core engine for God of War III was brand new. Between the 2009 Electronic Entertainment Expo (E3) and the time the game shipped, morphological anti-aliasing (MLAA) was added, which graphics engineer Ben Diamand said "improved edges dramatically and saved substantial amounts of frame-rate." MLAA is "now a popular edge-detection process that can cost-effectively remove jagged edges from each frame", which helped Santa Monica free up the processing cycle and "allowed them to add to the spectacle in other ways." Diamand also said that "depth-of-field, motion blur, crepuscular 'god' rays and refraction were either added or improved in quality and speed" during that same time period.

Asmussen estimated overall game length to be 10 to 20 hours, "depending on how good of a gamer you are." Santa Monica studio director John Hight reassured players that God of War III lasts longer than 10 hours: "We've done a lot of play testing on it ... We know, for a really hardcore player, it'll take them longer than it took them to play either of the previous God of War games." The finished game script was about 120 pages long, and the number of onscreen enemies increased from 15 in the previous games to a maximum of 50. To light the game, Turtle by Illuminate Labs was used. Head of development Christer Ericson of Santa Monica Studio confirmed that God of War III has seamless loading; no loading screens and no hard disk drive installation requirement. SCE America animator Bruno Velazquez said that while the first two God of War titles had computer-generated imagery (CGI) cinematics, there would be no true CGI in the third game: "all the cutscenes are created using our in-game engine." A God of War III game trailer debuted on Spike's GameTrailers TV on February 11, 2010, and Asmussen confirmed that all footage is of gameplay. New camera angles were added; during some major battles the player can still control Kratos while the camera pans away from the fight, and a first-person camera view was used for the final portion of the Poseidon and Zeus boss fights. According to Santa Monica Studio director of technology Tim Moss, God of War III used 35 gigabytes (GB) of Blu-ray Disc. God of War III's budget was $44 million USD, and the game had a staff of 132 at the end of its development.

Several voice actors returned from previous installments, including Terrence C. Carson, Erin Torpey, Corey Burton, Debi Derryberry, and Gwendoline Yeo, voicing Kratos, Athena, Zeus, Calliope, and Lysandra, respectively. Susan Blakeslee, who voiced two characters in God of War, voiced Gaia. Narrator Linda Hunt, who previously voiced Gaia, only provided an introductory narration for the game. Rip Torn, Natalie Lander, and Malcolm McDowell joined the cast of voice actors. Lloyd Sherr and Nolan North, who had originally voiced Cronos and Hades, were replaced by George Ball and Clancy Brown, respectively. Kevin Sorbo was chosen to voice Hercules because of his portrayal of the character in the television series, Hercules: The Legendary Journeys. Elijah Wood had a minor voice role, and Josh Keaton and Fred Tatasciore, who voiced characters in previous games, also had minor roles.

== Release ==
At E3 2009, the God of War III demo was unveiled, with Kratos on the cliffs of Mount Olympus battling Olympian legionnaires, a centaur, a chimera, and a cyclops. He decapitates Helios, encounters Perses, rides harpies, and uses the Blades of Athena and new weapons (the Nemean Cestus and Bow of Apollo). On October 28, 2009, SCE Europe sent emails to PlayStation Network members with an activation code for the demo. On October 30, GameStop began providing voucher codes for customers who pre-ordered the game, and early copies of God of War Collection had a voucher code to download the demo. The Blu-ray version of District 9 included the God of War III demo and a "making of" featurette, and the demo was released to Qore subscribers on February 4, 2010. On February 25, Sony Computer Entertainment released the demo for download on the PlayStation Store in Europe and North America. Just before the game's release, Eurogamer published an article comparing the graphics in the God of War III demo to those in the final game, reporting improved lighting and realistic motion blur in the final release.

God of War III was released in North America on March 16, 2010, on March 18 in Australia, March 19 in Europe, and March 25 in Japan. The game outsold its predecessor by nearly 400,000 copies in its first week. According to retail tracker NPD Group, God of War III sold about 1.1 million copies in the United States by the end of March 2010, making it the best-selling game of that month, and its opening-month sales were 32 percent higher than those of God of War II. By June 2012, God of War III had sold almost 5.2 million copies worldwide—about 2.8 million in North America, 2 million in PAL regions, and 417,866 in Japan and Asia. The game is also part of PlayStation 3's Greatest Hits lineup. On August 28, 2012, God of War III, God of War Collection, and God of War: Origins Collection were released in North America as the God of War Saga, part of Sony's PlayStation Collections line.

=== Marketing ===
God of War III had an extensive marketing campaign before its release. This campaign began in early 2008 when a teaser for God of War III appeared as an image (the original PlayStation 3 logo surrounded by the Greek omega) at the end of the instruction manual for God of War: Chains of Olympus. This was soon followed by a teaser trailer screened at Sony's 2008 E3 press conference. Another trailer premiered at the 2008 Spike Video Game Awards, and an "official" God of War III trailer was released in February 2009. A new trailer debuted with the release of God of War III on March 16, 2010. In October 2009, Santa Monica Studio announced the God of War III Ultimate Edition, available by pre-order in North America. The package included a replica Pandora's Box, a limited-edition The Art of God of War III book, and downloadable content (DLC) from the PlayStation Network, which included the "Challenge of Exile" mode, Kratos' "Dominus" costume, the God of War: Unearthing the Legend documentary, the God of War Trilogy Soundtrack, and the God of War: Blood & Metal EP. A limited Ultimate Trilogy Edition was released in Europe, Australia, and New Zealand and included the contents of the Ultimate Edition, as well as God of War Collection, four Kratos costumes, and God of War postcards. A God of War III PS3 bundle, with a 250 GB PS3 and a copy of God of War III, was also available in Europe. A God of War III media kit with special packaging and content was distributed to journalists in the PAL regions, and several were given as prizes on PlayStation Europe's website during the week of March 22, 2010. In Japan, God of War III was released in two packages: a standalone version and a God of War Trilogy Edition. The latter included God of War III, God of War Collection, an art book, and a Kratos skin.

For pre-orders, some retailers included a premium costume for Kratos: the Apollo, Forgotten Warrior, and Phantom of Chaos skins from Amazon.com, Game Crazy and Play.com, and GameStop, respectively. GameStop pre-orders also included a 17-by-24-inch (43 cm × 61 cm) poster signed by God of War III concept artist Andy Park and an entry in its "Be the Envy of the Gods" sweepstakes. 7-Eleven issued a God of War III poster for pre-orders and sold a Kratos' Fury Slurpee in God of War III cups. The cups and their specially marked Mountain Dew bottles had codes usable on the Slurpee website for God of War III downloadable content, including a behind-the-scenes video, wallpapers, PlayStation Home content, and an in-game Kratos skin, the Morpheus Armor.

In December 2009, Santa Monica accepted video submissions from players to determine the ultimate God of War fan. The top 18 submissions were included in the closing credits of God of War: Unearthing the Legend, and all winners received a copy of the God of War III Ultimate Edition signed by the development team. Sony and Spike TV sponsored a Last Titan Standing contest, in which fans over 21 could win a chance to play God of War III before its mainstream release. Spike's GameTrailers TV presented God of War III: Last Titan Standing on March 15, 2010, and the winner received a custom-made God of War III PS3. A week before God of War III's release, the developers released Kratos' backstory on the God of War website, under the title "Path to Olympus".

On March 20, 2010, a NASCAR car driven by Joey Logano during the Scotts Turf Builder 300 had a God of War III and GameStop-themed paint design. In April, Machinima.com released five "Art of the Game" videos for God of War III on the PlayStation Store, featuring interviews with team developers. A God of War III action figure line was produced by DC Unlimited. To celebrate the game's entrance into Sony's Greatest Hits library, Santa Monica sponsored a sweepstakes from March 4 to April 1, 2011. Fans could submit an original design of an "Ultimate God of War Monster" for one of three prizes: a limited folio edition, a special edition, and a paperback edition of The Art of God of War III, signed by the development team.

The game has 36 trophies, awarded for player achievements (for example, "Releasing the Floodgates" for killing Poseidon). When players received the platinum trophy, they were linked to the website spartansstandtall.com. On May 4, 2010, the site became the official website for God of War: Ghost of Sparta, the next installment in the series and the second for the PlayStation Portable. Early copies of Ghost of Sparta (and all digital copies in Europe) included a voucher to download Kratos' brother Deimos as a costume for use in God of War III.

=== Downloadable content ===
On November 2, 2010, the Dominus character skin and Challenge of Exile mode—previously exclusive to the Ultimate Edition and Ultimate Trilogy Edition—were released as a bundle on the PlayStation Store. The bundle is free for PlayStation Plus subscribers, who could receive the Phantom of Chaos and Forgotten Warrior skins when purchasing God of War and God of War II, respectively, for a limited time. All previous pre-order bonus costumes—Apollo, Forgotten Warrior, and Phantom of Chaos—and the 7-Eleven promotional DLC—the Morpheus Armor—were also released on the PlayStation Store.

=== God of War III Remastered ===
God of War III Remastered is a remastered port of God of War III for the PlayStation 4 console. It was first released in North America on July 14, 2015, followed by Australia and mainland Europe on July 15, and the UK on July 17. Santa Monica's Creative Director Cory Barlog announced the remastered game in celebration of the God of War franchise's tenth anniversary. Ported by Wholesale Algorithms, the remastered version has full 1080p support targeted at 60 frames per second and features a photo mode, allowing players to edit their photos and share their favorite moments. All of the DLC that was released for God of War III is included with God of War III Remastered. By the end of its first week of release, God of War III Remastered was ninth in sales at retail in the UK. For the entire month of July 2015, the downloadable version was the seventh best-selling PlayStation 4 title from the PlayStation Store. By June 2023, the game had sold an estimated 4 million copies.

=== Soundtrack ===
God of War III: Original Soundtrack from the Video Game

Soundtrack album by various composers
- Released: March 30, 2010
- Genre: Contemporary classical music
- Length: 58:42
- Labels: Sony Computer Entertainment and Sumthing Else

In March and April 2010, God of War III: Original Soundtrack from the Video Game, composed by Gerard K. Marino, Ron Fish, Mike Reagan, Jeff Rona, and Cris Velasco, was included as downloadable content in the God of War III Ultimate Edition and Ultimate Trilogy Edition. Its CD was released on March 30 by SCE and Sumthing Else. The soundtrack was recorded by the Skywalker Session Orchestra and the Czech National Symphony Chorus. Each composer provided a different aesthetic to the score: for example, Marino's approach was brooding, rhythmic, and percussive, and Fish set hopeless and somber moods. In an interview with Game Music Online, Mike Reagan said that although the composers might have used each other's themes, they did not collaborate with each other. Reagan said the real collaboration came from Clint Bajakian, Senior Music Supervisor at Sony, and his team. In scoring for God of War III, Reagan said that the composers were "able to explore more melodic development than we were on the first [God of War]." The score was recorded under the new American Federation of Musicians video game agreement and because of Sony's vision and support, the composers were able to record locally with some of the best musicians in the world. In an interview with PlayStation.Blog, Clint Bajakian described the different ensembles that recorded the score: the brass section is the "lead guitar", the choir gives the game its epic feel, the strings are the body of the sound, and the percussion is the foundation.

A nine-out-of-ten review from Square Enix Music Online praised the soundtrack's orchestration, calling it the best score in the series to date. G4 praised its quality, saying that the compositions were strong and it was "fantastic" as standalone music. A six-out-of-ten review from Tracksounds said that although the score "lacks the intricacy and personality that could set it apart and give it a sense of uniqueness...[it] delivers on its promise of a loud, wrathful bundle of tunes you can kill gods to...for better or worse." The reviewer said to "Enjoy in small doses." At the 2010 Spike Video Game Awards, the soundtrack was nominated for Best Original Score.

== Reception ==
Reception

Aggregate score
Aggregator	Score
Metacritic	92/100 (PS3); 81/100 (PS4)

Review scores
Publication	Score
1Up.com	A
Eurogamer	9/10
Game Informer	10/10 (PS3); 9/10 (PS4)
GameSpot	9.0/10 (PS3); 8.0/10 (PS4)
GameTrailers	9.2/10
IGN	9.3/10 (PS3); 8.8/10 (PS4)
PlayStation Official Magazine – UK	9/10
X-Play	5/5

God of War III received "universal acclaim" according to review aggregator website Metacritic, Adam Sessler of X-Play said that the game "finishes the trilogy on an exceptionally high note", and it "blends all of its best attributes into a stellar experience." IGN's Chris Roper said that God of War III "practically redefines" scale in video games, singling out the size of the Titans as being "larger than entire levels in other games". Mike Jackson of Official PlayStation Magazine UK called it the biggest God of War game yet; if it was the series' last game, "God of War III gives PlayStation's toughest hero the send-off he deserves."

Matt Leone of 1UP said that the gameplay has "variety ... You seemingly see, acquire, and participate in something new around every corner". According to Leone, each weapon "adds a lot of depth to the combat system." Christian Donlan of Eurogamer said that the "combat system, level flow, and pacing of bosses and puzzles remains largely untouched. But everything's bigger, grander and more elaborate." He praised the weapons' accessibility, saying that it is easy to quickly switch between them. According to Tom McShea of GameSpot, the combat and scale "have been pushed further than ever before ... creating an experience so focused and explosively fun that it's hard to put down, and even harder to forget." McShea said that regardless of repetition, "the brutality of combat is one of the most satisfying aspects of God of War III." Joe Juba of Game Informer called God of War III "visceral" and "brutal", and Kratos "the undisputed king of the genre." Jackson, however, said the core gameplay's familiarity "makes it feel less than the very, very best", and according to Roper, two of the three additional weapons are similar to the main blades; they "have unique powers and slightly different moves, but by and large they're more of the same."

Its plot received mixed reviews. GameTrailers said that God of War III's storyline makes Greek mythology more interesting. GameFront's Phil Hornshaw said it had an overly cruel protagonist, and the game assumed that the players reveled in the misery and violence as much as Kratos did. According to Donlan, the story is as simple as it can get. McShea said that although it does not pick up until near the end, it "becomes powerful and moving in unexpected ways, peaking in a thrilling conclusion that successfully touches on many different emotions and provides closure for this epic tale." Juba, on the other hand, considered that the plot "doesn't have any standout revelations or developments".

Jackson called God of War III's graphics as good as (if not better than) those in Killzone 2 and Uncharted 2: Among Thieves. According to Juba, the "cinematic camera work [is] even more impressive than Naughty Dog's feats with Uncharted 2." Roper said, "God of War III presents some of the most impressive visuals that I've ever seen in a game. Kratos in particular looks phenomenal, and is perhaps the single most impressive-looking character ever in videogames." According to GameTrailers, "the levels are expertly designed" and the game's scale is the most outstanding visual achievement.

=== Sales ===
Upon release God of War III sold over 1 million copies in the United States by the end of March 2010. The game sold 43,181 copies in Japan according to Media Create's weekly sales chart. By June 2012, God of War III has sold 5.1 million copies worldwide.

=== Awards and accolades ===
God of War III was awarded the "Most Anticipated Game of 2010" at the 2009 Spike Video Game Awards. At the 2010 Spike Video Game Awards, it was awarded "Best PS3 Game" and "Best Graphics", and Kratos received the "Biggest Badass" award. It was also a nominee for "Game of the Year", "Best Action Adventure Game", "Best Original Score", and "Character of the Year" (Kratos). Other individual awards include "Best Action/Adventure Game" (GameTrailers), "Best Action Game" (GameSpy), "Best PS3 Game" (Game Revolution), and "Best PS3 Exclusive" (Shacknews). At the 2011 British Academy of Film and Television Arts (BAFTA) Video Game Awards, God of War III received the "Artistic Achievement" award, and it was a nominee for the "Action" and "Gameplay" awards.

At the 14th Annual Interactive Achievement Awards (now known as the D.I.C.E. Awards), the Academy of Interactive Arts & Sciences awarded God of War III with "Outstanding Achievement in Animation"; it also received nominations for "Game of the Year", "Action Game of the Year", "Outstanding Achievement in Art Direction", "Outstanding Achievement in Visual Engineering", and "Outstanding Character Performance" for Terrence C. Carson's vocal portrayal of Kratos.

=== Remastered ===
Though the original release of God of War III was met with critical acclaim, God of War III Remastered only garnered "generally favorable reviews", according to review aggregator Metacritic. Reviewers found it odd that Sony decided to remaster God of War III for PlayStation 4, as its story picks up immediately from the ending of God of War II, which may confuse newcomers who have never played the previous games. Praise was given to the smoother textures and improved frame rate, though because the original already had impressive graphics, the changes were not major, and reviewers said these changes were not a strong enough argument to rebuy the game for US$40.
