= Annie Award for Outstanding Achievement for Character Animation in a Video Game =

Annual video game award

Annie Award for Character Animation in a Video Game
- Awarded for: Excellence in character animation
- Country: United States
- Presented by: ASIFA-Hollywood
- First award: 2014
- Currently held by: Compulsion Games – South of Midnight (2025)
- Website: annieawards.org

The Annie Award for Character Animation in a Video Game is an Annie Award given annually to the best character animation in video games. It was first presented at the 42nd Annie Awards.

== Winners and nominees ==
=== 2010s ===
Year	Video Game	Recipient(s)	Notes	Company
2014 (42nd)
2014 (42nd)	Assassin's Creed Unity	Mike Mennillo		Ubisoft Montreal
2014 (42nd)	Don't Starve: Console Edition	Alex Savin, Allan Cortez, Kelly Graham, Aaron Bouthillier, Jeff Agala		Klei Entertainment Inc.
2014 (42nd)	Child of Light	Alex Drouin		Ubisoft Montreal
2015 (43rd)
2015 (43rd)	Evolve	David Gibson	Character Animator: Daisy, Goliath, Kraken	2K Games
2015 (43rd)	Armikrog	Mike Dietz	Lead Animator: All Characters	Pencil Test Studios, Inc.
2015 (43rd)	Invisible, Inc.	Bruce Chang	Character Animator: Decker, Central, Nika, Guards	Klei Entertainment Inc.
2016 (44th)
2016 (44th)	Uncharted 4: A Thief's End	Jeremy Yates, Almudena Soria, Eric Baldwin, Paul Davies, Tom Bland	Lead Animators: All Characters	Naughty Dog
2016 (44th)	Teenage Mutant Ninja Turtles Legends	Lucio Mennillo, Martine Quesnel, Alexandre Cheff, Laura Gorrie, Guillaume Charrin	Character Animators, Lead Animator (Note: Character Animator: Lucio Mennillo (Character: Donatello Vision); Character Animator: Martine Quesnel (Character: Leonardo Vision); Character Animator: Alexandre Cheff (Character: Donatello LARP); Character Animator: Laura Gorrie (Character: Leatherhead LARP); Lead Animator: Guillaume Charrin (Character: Raphael Vision))	Ludia Inc.
2016 (44th)	Titanfall 2	Ranon Sarono, Shawn Wilson, Mark Grigsby, Paul Messerly, Moy Parra	Character Animators, Lead Animator (Note: Character Animator: Ranon Sarono (Character: Jack Cooper, BT-7274, Weapons); Character Animator: Shawn Wilson (Character: BT-7274, Creatures); Lead Animator: Mark Grigsby (Character: BT-7274, Jack Cooper, Viper, Weapons); Lead Animator: Paul Messerly (Character: BT-7274, Jack Cooper, AI); Character Animator: Moy Parra (Character BT-7274, Villains))	Respawn Entertainment
2016 (44th)	Witcher 3 Expansion Packs	Sebastian Kalemba	Lead Animator	CD Projekt Red
2017 (45th)
2017 (45th)	Cuphead	Hanna Abi-Hanna	Lead Animator: The Devil, Grim Matchstick, Beppi The Clown, Werner Werman	StudioMDHR
2017 (45th)	Hellblade: Senua's Sacrifice	Chris Goodall, Jitaik Lim, Kirill Spiridonov	Character Animators: Senua	Ninja Theory
2017 (45th)	Cuphead	Tina Nawrocki	Lead Animator (Note: Lead Animator: Tina Nawrocki (Characters: Baroness Von Bon Bon, Hopus Pocus, Pirouletta, Giant, Tipsy Troupe, Lobster, Porkrind, Dragonfly, The Devil – DEATH))	StudioMDHR
2017 (45th)	Horizon Zero Dawn	Richard Oud, Kevin Quaid, Niek Neervens, Jonathan Colin, Peer Lemmers	Lead Animator, Character Animator (Note: Lead Animator: Richard Oud (Character: All mechanical creatures); Kevin Quaid (Character: All humanoids); Character Animator: Niek Neervens; Jonathan Colin (Character: All humanoids); Character Animator: Peer Lemmers (Character: All mechanical creatures))	Guerrilla Games
2017 (45th)	Uncharted: The Lost Legacy	Almundena Soria, Keith Paciello, Paul Augustus Davies	Lead Animators: All Characters	Naughty Dog
2018 (46th)
2018 (46th)	Gris	Adrian Miguel, Adrian Garcia, Adrian Miguel	Lead Animators (Note: Lead Animator: Adrian Miguel (Character: Gris (Cinematics and In-Game)); Lead Animator: Adrian Garcia (Character: Gris (Cinematics)); Lead Animator: Adrian Miguel (Character: Sombra))	Nomada Studio
2018 (46th)	God of War	Erica Pinto, Mehdi Yssef, Bruno Velazquez	Lead Animators (Note: Lead Animator: Erica Pinto (Character: All characters in cinematics); Lead Animator: Mehdi Yssef (Character: All characters in gameplay); Lead Animator: Bruno Velazquez (Character: All characters))	Santa Monica Studio
2018 (46th)	Marvel's Spider-Man	Bobby Coddington	Lead Animator: Spider-Man	Insomniac Games
2018 (46th)	Moss	Richard Lico	Lead Animator: Quill	Polyarc
2018 (46th)	Shadow of the Tomb Raider	David Hubert, Jacob Gardner, Giovanni Spinelli, Marco Foglia, Jean-Philippe Chaurette	Lead Animator, Character Animators (Note: Lead Animator: David Hubert (Character: All cinematic characters); Character Animator: Jacob Gardner (Character: All cinematic characters); Character Animator: Giovanni Spinelli (Character: All cinematic characters); Character Animator: Marco Foglia (Character: All cinematic characters); Character Animator: Jean-Philippe Chaurette (Character: All gameplay characters))	Square Enix
2019 (47th)
2019 (47th)	Unruly Heroes	Sebastien Parodi, Nicolas Leger	Character Animator, Lead Animator (Note: Character Animator: Sebastien Parodi (Characters: Heroes Kid version, Underworld NPC); Lead Animator: Nicolas Leger (Character: Heroes (Wukong, Kihong, Sandmonk, Sanzang), All enemies (except Underworld levels) and cinematics))	Magic Design Studios
2019 (47th)	Gears 5	Brian Whitmire	Lead Animator: JD, Del, Marcus, Fahz, Reyna, Kait	The Coalition / Microsoft
2019 (47th)	Kingdom Hearts III	Munenori Shinagawa, Kayoko Yajima, Koji Hamada, Koji Inoue	Character Animators (Note: Character Animator: Munenori Shinagawa (Characters: Sora, Donald, Goofy, Mickey, Minnie, Daisy, Pluto, Jiminy, Yen Sid, Chip, Dale, Kairi, Riku, Xehanort, Ansem, Xemnas, Woody, Buzz, Hamm, Rex, Mike, Sulley, Boo, Jack, Gibbs, Elizabeth, Barbarossa, Will, Tia, Heartless); Character Animator: Kayoko Yajima (Characters: Sora, Donald, Goofy, Mickey, Minnie, Daisy, Pluto, Jiminy, Yen Sid, Chip, Dale, Kairi, Riku, Xehanort, Ansem, Xemnas, Woody, Buzz, Hamm, Rex, Mike, Sulley, Boo, Jack, Gibbs, Elizabeth, Barbarossa, Will, Tia, Heartless); Character Animator: Koji Hamada (Character: Sora, Donald, Goofy, Sulley, Mike, Marshmallow, Baymax, Buzz, Woody, Ariel, Heartless); Character Animator: Koji Inoue (Character: Sora, Donald, Goofy, Sulley, Mike, Marshmallow, Baymax, Buzz, Woody, Ariel, Heartless))	Square Enix
2019 (47th)	Sinclair Snake: Museum Mischief	Tommy Rodricks, Natan Moura, Nelson Boles	Character Animator (Note: Character Animator: Tommy Rodricks (Characters: Sgt. Salamander, Sinclair Snake); Character Animator: Natan Moura (Character: Sinclair Snake); Character Animator: Nelson Boles (Character: Various))	Chromosphere / Within

=== 2020s ===
Year	Video Game	Recipient(s)	Notes(s)	Company
2020 (48th)
2020 (48th)	Marvel's Spider-Man: Miles Morales	Brian Wyser, Michael Yosh, Danny Garnett, David Hancock		Insomniac Games
2020 (48th)	League of Legends	Jose "Sho" Hernandez, Jason Hendrich, Drew Morgan		Riot Games
2020 (48th)	Ori and the Will of the Wisps	Jim Donovan, Warren Goff, Boris Hiestand, Kim Nguyen, Jason Martinsen		Moon Studios / Xbox Game Studios / Iam8bit
2020 (48th)	The Last of Us Part II	Jeremy Yates, Eric Baldwin, Almudena Soria, Michal Mach, August Davies		Naughty Dog
2021 (49th)
2021 (49th)	Ratchet & Clank: Rift Apart	Insomniac Games		
2021 (49th)	It Takes Two	Hazelight Studios		
2021 (49th)	Kena: Bridge of Spirits	Ember Lab		
2021 (49th)	Madrid Noir	Aziz Kocanaogullari	Character Animator	Atlas V, No Ghost
2021 (49th)	Disney Wonderful Worlds	Ludia		
2022 (50th)
2022 (50th)	Cuphead: The Delicious Last Course	Chad Moldenhauer, Hanna Abi-Hanna		Studio MDHR
2022 (50th)	God of War Ragnarök	Santa Monica Studio		
2022 (50th)	Horizon Forbidden West	Richard Oud, Jan-Erik Sjovall, Guerrilla Animation Team		Guerrilla Games
2022 (50th)	Moss: Book II	Richard Lico		Polyarc
2022 (50th)	Potionomics	Emily Lattanavong, Anguel Bogoev		Voracious Games
2023 (51st)
2023 (51st)	Marvel's Spider-Man 2	Insomniac Games Animation Team		Insomaniac Games
2023 (51st)	Atomic Heart	Mundfish Animation Team		Mundfish
2023 (51st)	Hogwarts Legacy	Tara Edwards		Avalanche Software
2023 (51st)	Let's! Revolution	BUCK Animation Team		BUCK
2023 (51st)	Teslagrad 2	Aslak Helgesen		Rain Games
2024 (52nd)
2024 (52nd)	Neva	Nomada Studio Animation Team		Nomada Studio
2024 (52nd)	#BLUD	Chris Burns and Bob Fox		
2024 (52nd)	Asgard's Wrath 2	Sanzaru Games Animation Team		Sanzaru Games
2024 (52nd)	Diesel Legacy	Maximum Entertainment		
2024 (52nd)	Senua's Saga: Hellblade II	Ninja Theory		
2025 (53rd)
2025 (53rd)	South of Midnight	Mike Jungbluth, Sebastien Dussault, Vincent Schneider, and Remi Edmond		Compulsion Games
2025 (53rd)	Bye Sweet Carole	Chris Darril and Little Sewing Machine		
2025 (53rd)	Death Stranding 2: On the Beach	Hideo Kojima, Masaaki Kawata, and PlayStation Studios XDEV		Kojima Productions
2025 (53rd)	Ghost of Yōtei	Sucker Punch Productions Animation Team		Sucker Punch Productions
2025 (53rd)	Keeper	Zach Baharov, Alex Turner, Jerry Matsko, Anne-Sophie Savard, and Geneviève Desbiens		Double Fine Productions
