= D.I.C.E. Award for Outstanding Achievement in Animation =

Annual award presented by the Academy of Interactive Arts & Sciences

- Country: United States
- Presented by: Academy of Interactive Arts & Sciences
- First award: 1998
- Currently held by: South of Midnight
- Website: interactive.org

The D.I.C.E. Award for Outstanding Achievement in Animation is an award presented annually by the Academy of Interactive Arts & Sciences during the D.I.C.E. Awards. This award is "presented to the individual or team whose work represents the highest level of achievement in bringing a character or characters to life. This award will consider the fluidity of movement, and interaction with the environment in addition to contextual realism (look and feel)". Creative/technical Academy members with expertise as an artist, animator or programmer are qualified to vote for this award.

The award's most recent winner is South of Midnight, developed by Compulsion Games and published by Xbox Game Studios.

== Animation & Art Direction ==
The Academy originally offered Outstanding Achievement in Art/Graphics at the first two annual awards ceremonies. This would be separated into the categories of Outstanding Achievement in Art Direction and Outstanding Achievement in Animation at the third annual awards ceremony. Since the categories separated, roughly half of the finalists and winners for "Animation" and "Art Direction" were the same game within its respective release year. The games that had won both awards for "Animation" and "Art Direction" were:

- Final Fantasy VIII
- Final Fantasy IX
- Sly Cooper and the Thievius Raccoonus
- Half-Life 2
- Gears of War
- Uncharted 2: Among Thieves
- Uncharted 3: Drake's Deception
- The Last of Us
- Ori and the Blind Forest
- Cuphead
- Ratchet & Clank: Rift Apart
- God of War Ragnarök

The games that won the "Animation" award but were not finalists in the "Art Direction" category were:

- Assassin's Creed III
- Middle-earth: Shadow of Mordor
- Luigi's Mansion 3
- Astro Bot
- South of Midnight

2022 was the only year that the "Animation" and "Art Direction" categories had the same five finalists and winner. 2025 was the only year that the two categories did not have any of the same finalists.

== Winners and nominees ==
=== 1990s ===
Table key
Indicates the winner

Year	Game	Developer(s)	Publisher(s)	Ref.
1997/1998 (Note: Presented as Outstanding Achievement in Art/Graphics.) (1st)	Riven: The Sequel to Myst	Cyan Worlds	Red Orb Entertainment	
1997/1998 (1st)	Blade Runner	Westwood Studios	Virgin Interactive	
1997/1998 (1st)	Final Fantasy VII	SquareSoft	Sony Computer Entertainment	
1997/1998 (1st)	GoldenEye 007	Rare	Nintendo	
1997/1998 (1st)	Oddworld: Abe's Oddysee	Oddworld Inhabitants	GT Interactive	
1997/1998 (1st)	The Curse of Monkey Island	LucasArts	LucasArts	
1998/1999 (2nd)	Banjo-Kazooie	Rare	Nintendo	
1998/1999 (2nd)	Grim Fandango	LucasArts	LucasArts	
1998/1999 (2nd)	Half-Life	Valve	Sierra On-Line	
1998/1999 (2nd)	Spyro the Dragon	Insomniac Games	Sony Computer Entertainment	
1999/2000 (3rd)	Final Fantasy VIII	SquareSoft	Square Electronic Arts	
1999/2000 (3rd)	Age of Empires II: The Age of Kings	Ensemble Studios	Microsoft Games	
1999/2000 (3rd)	Disney's Villains' Revenge	Disney Interactive	Disney Interactive	
1999/2000 (3rd)	Spyro 2: Ripto's Rage!	Insomniac Games	Sony Computer Entertainment	

=== 2000s ===
Year	Game	Developer(s)	Publisher(s)	Ref.
2000 (4th)	Final Fantasy IX	SquareSoft	Square Electronic Arts	
2000 (4th)	Dead or Alive 2	Team Ninja	Tecmo	
2000 (4th)	Rayman 2: The Great Escape	Ubi Pictures	Ubisoft	
2000 (4th)	Space Channel 5	Sega AM9	Sega	
2000 (4th)	Tekken Tag Tournament	Namco	Namco	
2001 (5th)	Oddworld: Munch's Oddysee	Oddworld Inhabitants	Microsoft Game Studios	
2001 (5th)	Black & White	Lionhead Studios	Electronic Arts	
2001 (5th)	Dead or Alive 3	Team Ninja	Tecmo	
2001 (5th)	Super Smash Bros. Melee	HAL Laboratory	Nintendo	
2001 (5th)	Tony Hawk's Pro Skater 3	Neversoft	Activision	
2002 (6th)	Sly Cooper and the Thievius Raccoonus	Sucker Punch Productions	Sony Computer Entertainment	
2002 (6th)	Final Fantasy X	SquareSoft	Square Electronic Arts	
2002 (6th)	Kingdom Hearts	SquareSoft	Square Electronic Arts	
2002 (6th)	The Mark of Kri	San Diego Studio	Sony Computer Entertainment	
2002 (6th)	Ratchet & Clank	Insomniac Games	Sony Computer Entertainment	
2003 (7th)	Prince of Persia: The Sands of Time	Ubisoft Montreal	Ubisoft	
2003 (7th)	Beyond Good & Evil	Ubisoft Montpellier	Ubisoft	
2003 (7th)	Jak II	Naughty Dog	Sony Computer Entertainment	
2003 (7th)	Ratchet & Clank: Going Commando	Insomniac Games	Sony Computer Entertainment	
2003 (7th)	Soulcalibur II	Namco	Namco	
2004 (8th)	Half-Life 2	Valve	Vivendi Universal Games	
2004 (8th)	Jak 3	Naughty Dog	Sony Computer Entertainment	
2004 (8th)	Prince of Persia: Warrior Within	Ubisoft Montreal	Ubisoft	
2004 (8th)	Ratchet & Clank: Up Your Arsenal	Insomniac Games	Sony Computer Entertainment	
2004 (8th)	Sly 2: Band of Thieves	Sucker Punch Productions	Sony Computer Entertainment	
2005 (9th)	God of War	Santa Monica Studio	Sony Computer Entertainment	
2005 (9th)	Oddworld: Stranger's Wrath	Oddworld Inhabitants	Microsoft Game Studios	
2005 (9th)	Prince of Persia: The Two Thrones	Ubisoft Montreal	Ubisoft	
2005 (9th)	Rise of the Kasai	BottleRocket Entertainment	Sony Computer Entertainment	
2005 (9th)	Shadow of the Colossus	Japan Studio	Sony Computer Entertainment	
2006 (10th)	Gears of War	Epic Games	Microsoft Game Studios	
2006 (10th)	Daxter	Ready at Dawn	Sony Computer Entertainment	
2006 (10th)	Fight Night Round 3	EA Chicago	Electronic Arts	
2006 (10th)	Lego Star Wars II: The Original Trilogy	Traveller's Tales	LucasArts	
2006 (10th)	Rayman Raving Rabbids	Ubisoft Montpellier	Ubisoft	
2007 (11th)	Assassin's Creed	Ubisoft Montreal	Ubisoft	
2007 (11th)	Call of Duty 4: Modern Warfare	Infinity Ward	Activision	
2007 (11th)	Ratchet & Clank Future: Tools of Destruction	Insomniac Games	Sony Computer Entertainment	
2007 (11th)	Team Fortress 2	Valve	Valve, Electronic Arts	
2007 (11th)	Uncharted: Drake's Fortune	Naughty Dog	Sony Computer Entertainment	
2008 (12th)	Prince of Persia	Ubisoft Montreal	Ubisoft	
2008 (12th)	Castle Crashers	The Behemoth	Microsoft Game Studios	
2008 (12th)	Gears of War 2	Epic Games	Microsoft Game Studios	
2008 (12th)	Left 4 Dead	Valve South	Valve	
2008 (12th)	Metal Gear Solid 4: Guns of the Patriots	Kojima Productions	Konami	
2009 (13th)	Uncharted 2: Among Thieves	Naughty Dog	Sony Computer Entertainment	
2009 (13th)	Assassin's Creed II	Ubisoft Montreal	Ubisoft	
2009 (13th)	Batman: Arkham Asylum	Rocksteady Studios	Warner Bros. Interactive Entertainment	
2009 (13th)	Call of Duty: Modern Warfare 2	Infinity Ward	Activision	
2009 (13th)	Ratchet & Clank Future: A Crack in Time	Insomniac Games	Sony Computer Entertainment	

=== 2010s ===
Year	Game	Developer(s)	Publisher(s)	Ref.
2010 (14th)	God of War III	Santa Monica Studio	Sony Computer Entertainment	
2010 (14th)	Call of Duty: Black Ops	Treyarch	Activision	
2010 (14th)	Enslaved: Odyssey to the West	Ninja Theory	Namco Bandai Games	
2010 (14th)	Red Dead Redemption	Rockstar San Diego	Rockstar Games	
2010 (14th)	Tom Clancy's Splinter Cell: Conviction	Ubisoft Montreal	Ubisoft	
2011 (15th)	Uncharted 3: Drake's Deception	Naughty Dog	Sony Computer Entertainment	
2011 (15th)	Assassin's Creed: Revelations	Ubisoft Montreal	Ubisoft	
2011 (15th)	Batman: Arkham City	Rocksteady Studios	Warner Bros. Interactive Entertainment	
2011 (15th)	L.A. Noire	Team Bondi	Rockstar Games	
2011 (15th)	Rayman Origins	Ubisoft Montpellier	Ubisoft	
2012 (16th)	Assassin's Creed III	Ubisoft Montreal	Ubisoft	
2012 (16th)	Far Cry 3	Ubisoft Montreal	Ubisoft	
2012 (16th)	Hitman: Absolution	IO Interactive	Square Enix Europe	
2012 (16th)	Mark of the Ninja	Klei Entertainment	Microsoft Studios	
2012 (16th)	Uncharted: Golden Abyss	Bend Studio	Sony Computer Entertainment	
2013 (17th)	The Last of Us	Naughty Dog	Sony Computer Entertainment	
2013 (17th)	Assassin's Creed IV: Black Flag	Ubisoft Montreal	Ubisoft	
2013 (17th)	Beyond: Two Souls	Quantic Dream	Sony Computer Entertainment	
2013 (17th)	Puppeteer	Japan Studio	Sony Computer Entertainment	
2013 (17th)	Rayman Fiesta Run	Ubisoft Casablanca	Ubisoft	
2014 (18th)	Middle-earth: Shadow of Mordor	Monolith Productions	Warner Bros. Interactive Entertainment	
2014 (18th)	Assassin's Creed Unity	Ubisoft Montreal	Ubisoft	
2014 (18th)	Infamous Second Son	Sucker Punch Productions	Sony Computer Entertainment	
2014 (18th)	Sunset Overdrive	Insomniac Games	Microsoft Studios	
2014 (18th)	Titanfall	Respawn Entertainment	Electronic Arts	
2015 (19th)	Ori and the Blind Forest	Moon Studios	Microsoft Studios	
2015 (19th)	Assassin's Creed Syndicate	Ubisoft Quebec	Ubisoft	
2015 (19th)	Batman: Arkham Knight	Rocksteady Studios	Warner Bros. Interactive Entertainment	
2015 (19th)	Rise of the Tomb Raider	Crystal Dynamics	Square Enix Europe	
2015 (19th)	The Order: 1886	Ready at Dawn	Sony Computer Entertainment	
2016 (20th)	Uncharted 4: A Thief's End	Naughty Dog	Sony Interactive Entertainment	
2016 (20th)	Inside	Playdead	Playdead	
2016 (20th)	The Last Guardian	Japan Studio, GenDesign	Sony Interactive Entertainment	
2016 (20th)	Overwatch	Blizzard Entertainment	Blizzard Entertainment	
2016 (20th)	Street Fighter V	Capcom, Dimps	Capcom	
2017 (21st)	Cuphead	Studio MDHR	Studio MDHR	
2017 (21st)	For Honor	Ubisoft Montreal	Ubisoft	
2017 (21st)	Hellblade: Senua's Sacrifice	Ninja Theory	Ninja Theory	
2017 (21st)	Horizon Zero Dawn	Guerrilla Games	Sony Interactive Entertainment	
2017 (21st)	Uncharted: The Lost Legacy	Naughty Dog	Sony Interactive Entertainment	
2018 (22nd)	Marvel's Spider-Man	Insomniac Games	Sony Interactive Entertainment	
2018 (22nd)	God of War	Santa Monica Studio	Sony Interactive Entertainment	
2018 (22nd)	Gris	Nomada Studio	Devolver Digital	
2018 (22nd)	Moss	Polyarc	Polyarc	
2018 (22nd)	Red Dead Redemption 2	Rockstar Games	Rockstar Games	
2019 (23rd)	Luigi's Mansion 3	Next Level Games	Nintendo	
2019 (23rd)	Call of Duty: Modern Warfare	Infinity Ward	Activision	
2019 (23rd)	Days Gone	Bend Studio	Sony Interactive Entertainment	
2019 (23rd)	Death Stranding	Kojima Productions	Sony Interactive Entertainment	
2019 (23rd)	Devil May Cry 5	Capcom	Capcom	

=== 2020s ===
Year	Game	Developer(s)	Publisher(s)	Ref.
2020 (24th)	The Last of Us Part II	Naughty Dog	Sony Interactive Entertainment	
2020 (24th)	Final Fantasy VII Remake	Square Enix	Square Enix	
2020 (24th)	Marvel's Spider-Man: Miles Morales	Insomniac Games	Sony Interactive Entertainment	
2020 (24th)	Ori and the Will of the Wisps	Moon Studios	Xbox Game Studios	
2020 (24th)	Spiritfarer	Thunder Lotus Games	Thunder Lotus Games	
2021 (25th)	Ratchet & Clank: Rift Apart	Insomniac Games	Sony Interactive Entertainment	
2021 (25th)	Call of Duty: Vanguard	Sledgehammer Games	Activision	
2021 (25th)	Deathloop	Arkane Studios	Bethesda Softworks	
2021 (25th)	Kena: Bridge of Spirits	Ember Lab	Ember Lab	
2021 (25th)	Resident Evil Village	Capcom	Capcom	
2022 (26th)	God of War Ragnarök	Santa Monica Studio	Sony Interactive Entertainment	
2022 (26th)	Cuphead - The Delicious Last Course	Studio MDHR	Studio MDHR	
2022 (26th)	Elden Ring	FromSoftware	Bandai Namco Entertainment	
2022 (26th)	Horizon Forbidden West	Guerrilla Games	Sony Interactive Entertainment	
2022 (26th)	Moss: Book II	Polyarc	Polyarc	
2023 (27th)	Marvel's Spider-Man 2	Insomniac Games	Sony Interactive Entertainment	
2023 (27th)	Final Fantasy XVI	Square Enix	Square Enix	
2023 (27th)	Hi-Fi Rush	Tango Gameworks	Bethesda Softworks	
2023 (27th)	Mortal Kombat 1	NetherRealm Studios	Warner Bros. Games	
2023 (27th)	Super Mario Bros. Wonder	Nintendo EPD	Nintendo	
2024 (28th)	Astro Bot	Team Asobi	Sony Interactive Entertainment	
2024 (28th)	Call of Duty: Black Ops 6	Treyarch	Activision	
2024 (28th)	Final Fantasy VII Rebirth	Square Enix	Square Enix	
2024 (28th)	Neva	Nomada Studio	Devolver Digital	
2024 (28th)	Warhammer 40,000: Space Marine 2	Saber Interactive	Focus Entertainment	
2025 (29th)	South of Midnight	Compulsion Games	Xbox Game Studios	
2025 (29th)	Death Stranding 2: On the Beach	Kojima Productions	Sony Interactive Entertainment	
2025 (29th)	Ghost of Yōtei	Sucker Punch Productions	Sony Interactive Entertainment	
2025 (29th)	Monster Hunter Wilds	Capcom	Capcom	
2025 (29th)	The Midnight Walk	MoonHood	Fast Travel Games	

== Multiple nominations and wins ==
=== Developers and publishers ===
Sony has published the most nominees and winners. Sony has the distinction of publishing the most nominees within a year (three) on four separate occasions (during the awards ceremony in 2003, 2005, 2006, and 2014). Sony has two winning streaks for publishing the category winners (2010 to 2012, and 2021 to 2025). Activision has published the most nominees without a single winner.

Sony's development subsidiary Naughty Dog has developed the most winners in this category. Ubisoft Montreal has developed the most nominees, and is one of two developers with back-to-back wins, with the other being SquareSoft. Both Ubisoft Montpellier, formerly known as "Ubi Pictures", and Capcom have developed the most nominees without a single winner.

Developers
Developer	Nominations	Wins
Naughty Dog	9	5
Ubisoft Montreal	13	4
Insomniac Games	12	3
Santa Monica Studio	4	3
SquareSoft/Square Enix	8	2
Sucker Punch Productions	4	1
Oddworld Inhabitants	3	1
Valve	3	1
Epic Games	2	1
Moon Studios	2	1
Rare	2	1
Studio MDHR	2	1
Capcom	4	0
Ubi Pictures/Ubisoft Montpellier	4	0
Infinity Ward	3	0
Japan Studio	3	0
Kojima Productions	3	0
Rocksteady Studios	3	0
Bend Studio	2	0
Guerrilla Games	2	0
LucasArts	2	0
Namco	2	0
Ninja Theory	2	0
Nomada Studio	2	0
Polyarc	2	0
Ready at Dawn	2	0
Team Ninja	2	0
Treyarch	2	0

Publishers
Publisher	Nominations	Wins
Sony Computer/Interactive Entertainment	44	13
Ubisoft	19	4
Microsoft/Xbox Game Studios	11	4
Electronic Arts	8	2
SquareSoft/Square Enix	7	2
Nintendo	5	2
Warner Bros. Interactive Entertainment / Warner Bros. Games	5	1
Studio MDHR	2	1
Activision	7	0
Capcom	4	0
Namco/Bandai Namco Games/Entertainment	4	0
Valve	4	0
LucasArts	3	0
Rockstar Games	3	0
Bethesda Softworks	2	0
Devolver Digital	2	0
Polyarc	2	0
Square Enix Europe	2	0
Tecmo	2	0

=== Franchises ===
Assassin's Creed and Final Fantasy have been the most nominated franchises, while Uncharted and God of War have been the most award-winning franchises. Final Fantasy is the only franchise to have back-to-back wins. Call of Duty is the most nominated franchise that has never won.

Franchises
Franchises	Nominations	Wins
Uncharted	6	3
God of War	4	3
Assassin's Creed	7	2
Final Fantasy	7	2
Prince of Persia	4	2
Marvel's Spider-Man	3	2
The Last of Us	2	2
Ratchet & Clank	6	1
Oddworld	3	1
Cuphead	2	1
Gears of War	2	1
Half-Life	2	1
Mario (Note: includes Luigi's Mansion 3.)	2	1
Ori	2	1
Sly Cooper	2	1
Call of Duty	6	0
Rayman	4	0
Batman: Arkham	3	0
Jak and Daxter	3	0
Dead of Alive	2	0
Death Stranding	2	0
Horizon	2	0
Moss	2	0
Red Dead	2	0
Spyro	2	0
