= 22nd Annual D.I.C.E. Awards =

Video game award ceremony

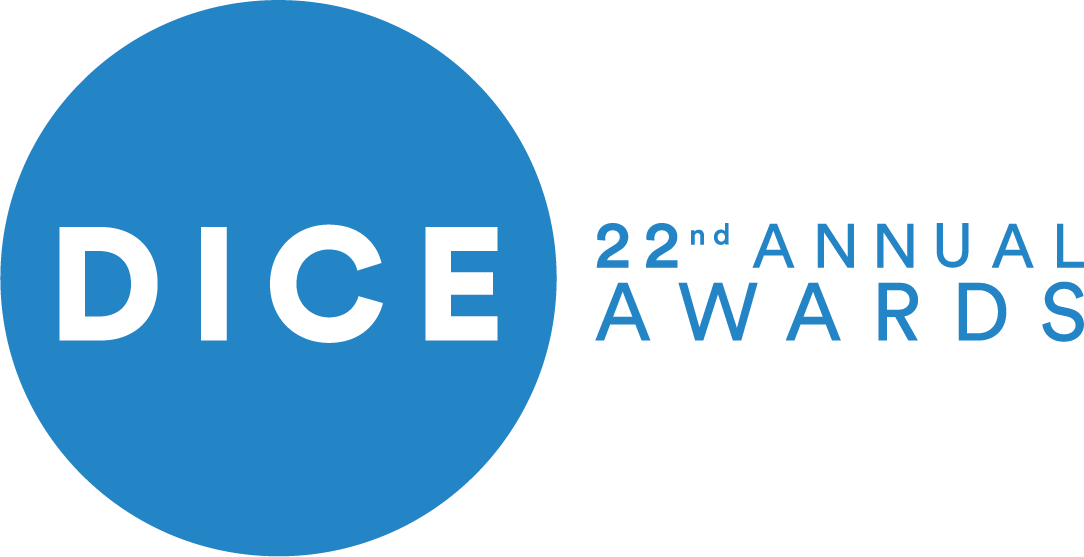
- Date: February 13, 2019
- Venue: Aria Resort and Casino
- Country: Paradise, Nevada, USA
- Hosted by: Jessica Chobot and Greg Miller

Highlights
- Most awards: God of War (9)
- Most nominations: God of War (12)
- Game of the Year: God of War
- Hall of Fame: Bonnie Ross

The 22nd Annual D.I.C.E. Awards was the 22nd edition of the D.I.C.E. Awards, an annual awards event that honored the best games in the video game industry during 2018. The awards were arranged by the Academy of Interactive Arts & Sciences (AIAS) and were held at the Aria Resort and Casino in Paradise, Nevada on February 13, 2019. It was also held as part of the Academy's 2019 D.I.C.E. Summit, and was co-hosted by Jessica Chobot of Nerdist News, and Kinda Funny co-founder Greg Miller.

The award for "Outstanding Achievement in Online Gameplay" was relabeled as "Online Game of the Year". The categories for "Handheld Game of the Year" and "Mobile Game of the Year" were merged into the category "Portable Game of the Year". The "D.I.C.E. Sprite Award" was replaced with "Outstanding Achievement for an Independent Game", given how similar the category descriptions are.

God of War received the most nominations and won the most awards including "Game of the Year". Sony Interactive Entertainment was the most nominated and award-winning publisher, which published the most nominated games, along with their Santa Monica Studio being the most nominated and award-winning developer. Nintendo was the only other publisher with more than one award-winning game.

Bonnie Ross, co-founder and head of 343 Industries, was inducted into the Academy's Hall of Fame.

== Winners and Nominees ==
Winners are listed first, highlighted in boldface, and indicated with a double dagger (‡).

=== Game of the Year awards ===
**Game of the Year**: **God of War (SIE Santa Monica) — Cory Barlog, Yumi Yang, Shannon Studstill**‡; Into the Breach (Subset Games) — Matthew Davis, Justin Ma; Marvel's Spider-Man (Insomniac Games, Sony Interactive Entertainment) — Scott Michalek, Bryan Intihar, Ryan Smith; Red Dead Redemption 2 (Rockstar Games) — Sam Houser, Dan Houser, Rob Nelson, Aaron Garbut, Phil Hooker; Return of the Obra Dinn (Lucas Pope, 3909) — Lucas Pope	**Online Game of the Year**: **Fortnite (Epic Games) — Donald Mustard**‡; Destiny 2: Forsaken (Bungie, High Moon Studios, Activision) — Brad Fish, Del Chafe III, Mario Olivencia; Laser League (Roll7, 505 Games) — John Ribbins, Thomas Hegarty, Simon Bennett; Red Dead Redemption 2 (Rockstar Games) — Josh Needleman, Tarek Hamad, John Sripan; Sea of Thieves (Rare, Microsoft Studios) — Mike Chapman, Rich Semmens
**Portable Game of the Year**: **Florence (Mountains, Annapurna Interactive) — Kamina Vincent, Ken Wong**‡; Dandara (Long Hat House, Raw Fury) — Gordon Van Dyke, João Brant, Lucas Mattos, Victor Leão, Thommaz Kauffman; Donut County (Ben Esposito, Annapurna Interactive) — Ben Esposito; Dragalia Lost (Cygames, Nintendo) — Hideki Konno, Ryosuke Matsumoto, Hiroki Matsuura; Oddmar (Mobge Ltd.) — Ozgur Taskin	**Outstanding Achievement for an Independent Game**: **Celeste (Matt Makes Games) — Pedro Medeiros, Noel Berry, Matt Thorson**‡; Florence (Mountains, Annapurna Interactive) — Kamina Vincent, Ken Wong; Into the Breach (Subset Games) — Matthew Davis, Justin Ma; Minit (Kitty, JW, Jukio, & Dom, Devolver Digital) — Kitty Calis, Jan Willem Nijman, Jukio Kallio, Dominik Johann; Return of the Obra Dinn (Lucas Pope, 3909) — Lucas Pope

=== Immersive Reality awards ===
**Immersive Reality Game of the Year**: **Beat Saber (Beat Games) — Jan Ilavsky**‡; Astro Bot Rescue Mission (Japan Studio, Sony Interactive Entertainment) — Nicolas Doucet, Sebastian Brueckner, Gento Morita, Takumi Yoshida; Moss (Polyarc) — Chris Alderson, Tam Armstrong, Danny Bulla, Rick Lico; Sprint Vector (Survios) — Nathan Burba, James Iliff, Alexander Silkin, Mike McTyre, Andrew Abedian, Chris Thompson; Transference (Ubisoft Montreal, SpectreVision) — Kevin Racape, Elijah Wood, Daniel Noah, Lisa Whalen, Josh Waller, Kyle McCullough, Benoit Richer	**Immersive Reality Technical Achievement**: **Tónandi (Magic Leap) — Mike Tucker, Stephen Mangiat**‡; Astro Bot Rescue Mission (Japan Studio, Sony Interactive Entertainment) — Yuki Miyamae, Sebastian Brueckner, Takumi Yoshida, Nicolas Doucet; Beat Saber (Beat Games) — Jan Ilavsky; Dr. Grordbort's Invaders (Magic Leap, Weta Workshop) — Michael Keith; Torn (Aspyr Media) — Neill Glancy, Alex Talbot, Dave Prout, Mark Ahlin

=== Craft awards ===
**Outstanding Achievement in Game Direction**: **God of War (SIE Santa Monica) — Cory Barlog**‡; Florence (Mountains, Annapurna Interactive) — Ken Wong; Marvel's Spider-Man (Insomniac Games, Sony Interactive Entertainment) — Bryan Intihar, Ryan Smith; Red Dead Redemption 2 (Rockstar Games) — Sam Houser, Dan Houser, Aaron Garbut, Rob Nelson, Phil Hooker; Return of the Obra Dinn (Lucas Pope, 3909) — Lucas Pope	**Outstanding Achievement in Game Design**: **God of War (SIE Santa Monica) — Jason McDonald, Rob Davis, Luis R. Sanchez, Andrew Chrysafidis, Cory Barlog**‡; Into the Breach (Subset Games) — Matthew Davis, Justin Ma; Marvel's Spider-Man (Insomniac Games, Sony Interactive Entertainment) — Cameron Christian; Return of the Obra Dinn (Lucas Pope, 3909) — Lucas Pope; Subnautica (Unknown Worlds Entertainment) — Charlie Cleveland
**Outstanding Achievement in Animation**: **Marvel's Spider-Man (Insomniac Games, Sony Interactive Entertainment) — Bobby Coddington**‡; God of War (SIE Santa Monica) — Bruno Velazquez, Erica Pinto, Mehdi Yssef; Gris (Nomada Studio, Devolver Digital) — Adrian Miguel; Moss (Polyarc) — Richard Lico; Red Dead Redemption 2 (Rockstar Games) — Jim Jagger, Mark Tennant	**Outstanding Achievement in Art Direction**: **God of War (SIE Santa Monica) — Luke Berliner, Dela Longfish, Nate Stephens, John Palamarchuk, Rafael Grassetti**‡; Detroit: Become Human (Quantic Dream, Sony Interactive Entertainment) — Christophe Brusseaux, Thierry Prodhomme, Benoît Godde; Gris (Nomada Studio, Devolver Digital) — Conrad Roset; Marvel's Spider-Man (Insomniac Games, Sony Interactive Entertainment) — Jacinda Chew; Red Dead Redemption 2 (Rockstar Games) — Aaron Garbut, Paul MacPherson, Josh Bass
**Outstanding Achievement in Character**: **Kratos, God of War (SIE Santa Monica) — Actor Christopher Judge; creative director Cory Barlog**‡; Kassandra, Assassin's Creed Odyssey (Ubisoft Quebec) — Voice actor Melissanthi Mahut; narrative director Melissa MacCoubrey; Atreus, God of War (SIE Santa Monica) — Actor Sunny Suljic; creative director Cory Barlog; Peter Parker/Spider-Man, Marvel's Spider-Man (Insomniac Games, Sony Interactive Entertainment) — Voice actor Yuri Lowenthal; writers Jon Paquette, Christos Gage, and Ben Arfmann; Arthur Morgan, Red Dead Redemption 2 (Rockstar Games) — Voice actor Roger Clark; writers Dan Houser, Michael Unsworth, and Rupert Humphries	**Outstanding Achievement in Original Music Composition**: **God of War (SIE Santa Monica) — Bear McCreary, Peter Scaturro, Keith Leary**‡; Detroit: Become Human (Quantic Dream, Sony Interactive Entertainment) — Nima Fakhrara, John Paesano, Philip Sheppard, Mary Lockwood; Forgotton Anne (ThroughLine Games, Square Enix Collective) — Peter Due; Marvel's Spider-Man (Insomniac Games, Sony Interactive Entertainment) — John Paesano; Tetris Effect (Monstars, Resonair, Enhance Games) — Hydelic
**Outstanding Achievement in Sound Design**: **God of War (SIE Santa Monica) — Mike Niederquell, Leilani Ramirez**‡; Battlefield V (DICE, Electronic Arts) — Bence Pajor, Olof Stromqvist, Andreas Almstrom, Mari Saastamoinen Mino; Detroit: Become Human (Quantic Dream, Sony Interactive Entertainment) — Aurelien Baguerre, Xavier Despas, Alexis Antoni, Sylvian Buffet, Carl Malherbe; Marvel's Spider-Man (Insomniac Games, Sony Interactive Entertainment) — Dwight Okahara, Paul Mudra; Moss (Polyarc) — Stephen Hodde	**Outstanding Achievement in Story**: **God of War (SIE Santa Monica) — Cory Barlog, Matt Sophos, Richard Zangrande Gaubert**‡; Assassin's Creed Odyssey (Ubisoft Quebec) — Melissa MacCoubrey, Jonathan Dumont, Hugo Giard; Florence — (Mountains, Annapurna Interactive) — Ken Wong; Marvel's Spider-Man (Insomniac Games, Sony Interactive Entertainment) — Jon Paquette, Christos Gage, Ben Arfmann; Return of the Obra Dinn (Lucas Pope, 3909) — Lucas Pope
**Outstanding Technical Achievement**: **Red Dead Redemption 2 (Rockstar Games) — Rob Nelson, Imran Sarwar, Aaron Garbut, Phil Hooker, Stuart Petri, Dave Hynd**‡; Astro Bot Rescue Mission (Japan Studio, Sony Interactive Entertainment) — Yuki Miyamae, Sebastian Brueckner, Takumi Yoshida, Nicolas Doucet; Battlefield V (DICE, Electronic Arts) — Christian Holmquist, Johannes Deligiannis, Yasin Uludang; God of War (SIE Santa Monica) — Florian Strauss, Josh Hobson, Jeet Shroff; Marvel's Spider-Man (Insomniac Games, Sony Interactive Entertainment) — Cameron Christian, Gil Doron

=== Genre awards ===
**Action Game of the Year**: **Celeste (Matt Makes Games) — Pedro Medeiros, Noel Berry, Matt Thorson**‡; Call of Duty: Black Ops 4 (Treyarch, Activision) — Jonathan Moses, Dan Bunting, Mark Gordon; Destiny 2: Forsaken (Bungie, High Moon Studios, Activision) — Scott Taylor, Steve Cotton, Jason Harris, Shi Kai Wang; Far Cry 5 (Ubisoft Montreal) — Darryl Long, Dan Hay, Patrik Methe; Shadow of the Tomb Raider (Eidos-Montréal, Square Enix) — Mario Chabtini, Daniel Chayer-Bisson	**Adventure Game of the Year**: **God of War (SIE Santa Monica) — Cory Barlog, Yumi Yang, Shannon Studstill**‡; Detroit: Become Human (Quantic Dream, Sony Interactive Entertainment) — Guillaume de Fondaumière, David Cage; Marvel's Spider-Man (Insomniac Games, Sony Interactive Entertainment) — Scott Michalek, Bryan Intihar, Ryan Smith; Red Dead Redemption 2 (Rockstar Games) — Sam Houser, Dan Houser, Rob Nelson, Aaron Garbut, Phil Hooker; Return of the Obra Dinn (Lucas Pope, 3909) — Lucas Pope
**Family Game of the Year**: **Unravel Two (Coldwood Interactive, Electronic Arts) — Michael Gill, Martin Sahlin, Jakob Marklund, Josh Baldwin**‡; Astro Bot Rescue Mission (Japan Studio, Sony Interactive Entertainment) — Nicolas Doucet, Sebastian Brueckner, Gento Morita, Takumi Yoshida; Kirby Star Allies (HAL Laboratory, Nintendo) — Tadashi Kamitake, Hitoshi Yamagami, Shinya Kumazaki; Lego DC Super-Villains (Traveller's Tales, Warner Bros. Interactive Entertainment) — Matthew Ellison, Anna Bailey, Stephen Sharples; Starlink: Battle for Atlas (Ubisoft Toronto) — Matthew Rose, Laurent Malville, Richard Carrillo	**Fighting Game of the Year**: **Super Smash Bros. Ultimate (Sora Ltd, Bandai Namco Studios, Nintendo) — Shinya Saito, Yoshito Higuchi, Masahiro Sakurai**‡; BlazBlue: Cross Tag Battle (Arc System Works) — Toshimichi Mori, Tatsunori Ishikawa; Dragon Ball FighterZ (Arc System Works, Bandai Namco Entertainment) — Tomoko Hiroki, Junya Motomura; Soulcalibur VI (Bandai Namco Studios) — Motohiro Okubo, Daishi Odashima
**Racing Game of the Year**: **Forza Horizon 4 (Playground Games, Microsoft Studios) — Adam Askew, Ralph Fulton, Alan Roberts, Benjamin Penrose, Gavin Raeburn**‡; F1 2018 (Codemasters) — Ian Flatt, Lee Mather; Wreckfest (Bugbear Entertainment, THQ Nordic) — Roger Joswig, Janne Alanenpää	**Role-Playing Game of the Year**: **Monster Hunter: World (Capcom) — Ryozo Tsujimoto, Kaname Fujioka, Yuya Tokuda**‡; Assassin's Creed Odyssey (Ubisoft Quebec) — Marc-Alexis Cōté, Jonathan Dumont, Scott Phillips; Dragon Quest XI: Echoes of an Elusive Age (Square Enix) — Hokuto Okamoto, Yuji Horli, Takeshi Uchikawa; Ni no Kuni II: Revenant Kingdom (Level-5, Bandai Namco Entertainment) — Hiroyuki Watanabe, Akihiro Hino, Yoshiaki Kusuda, Takafumi Koukami; Pillars of Eternity II: Deadfire (Obsidian Entertainment, Techland) — Justin Britch, Adam Brennecke, Josh Sawyer
**Sports Game of the Year**: **Mario Tennis Aces (Camelot Software Planning, Nintendo) — Toshiharu Izuno, Hiroyuki Takahashi, Shugo Takahashi, Tomohiro Yamamura**‡; FIFA 19 (EA Vancouver, EA Romania) — Aaron McHardy, Nick Wlodyka; MLB The Show 18 (SIE San Diego) — Marcus Efting, Nick Livingston, Jason Villa	**Strategy/Simulation Game of the Year**: **Into the Breach (Subset Games) — Matthew Davis, Justin Ma**‡; Bad North (Plausible Concept, Raw Fury) — Liam O'Neill, Oskar Stålberg, Richard Meredith, Martin Kvale; Frostpunk (11 Bit Studios) — Michal Drozdowski, Przemyslaw Marszal, Jakub Stokalski; Northgard (Shiro Games) — Nicolas Cannasse, Sebastien Vidal; RimWorld (Ludeon Studios) — Tynan Sylvester

=== Special awards ===
==== Hall of Fame ====
- Bonnie Ross

=== Multiple nominations and awards ===
==== Multiple Nominations ====
Games that received multiple nominations
Nominations	Game
12	God of War
11	Marvel's Spider-Man
8	Red Dead Redemption 2
6	Return of the Obra Dinn
4	Astro Bot Rescue Mission
4	Detroit: Become Human
4	Florence
4	Into the Breach
3	Assassin's Creed Odyssey
3	Moss
2	Battlefield V
2	Beat Saber
2	Celeste
2	Destiny 2: Forsaken
2	Gris

Nominations by company
Nominations	Games	Company
32	5	Sony Interactive Entertainment
11	1	Insomniac Games
8	1	Rockstar Games
6	4	Ubisoft
6	1	3909
5	2	Annapurna Interactive
4	4	Bandai Namco Entertainment
4	4	Nintendo
4	3	Electronic Arts
4	1	Mountains
4	1	Quantic Dream
4	1	Subset Games
3	3	Square Enix
3	2	Activision
3	2	Devolver Digital
3	1	Polyarc
2	2	Magic Leap
2	2	Microsoft Studios
2	2	Raw Fury
2	1	Beat Games
2	1	Bungie
2	1	DICE
2	1	Matt Makes Games
2	1	Nomada Studio

==== Multiple awards ====
Games that received multiple awards
Awards	Game
9	God of War
2	Celeste

Awards by company
Awards	Games	Company
10	2	Sony Interactive Entertainment
2	2	Nintendo
2	1	Matt Makes Games
