= D.I.C.E. Award for Outstanding Achievement in Audio Design =

Annual award presented by the Academy of Interactive Arts & Sciences

- Country: United States
- Presented by: Academy of Interactive Arts & Sciences
- First award: 1998
- Currently held by: Death Stranding 2: On the Beach
- Website: interactive.org

The D.I.C.E. Award for Outstanding Achievement in Audio Design is an award presented annually by the Academy of Interactive Arts & Sciences during the D.I.C.E. Awards. This award is "presented to the individual or team whose work represents the highest level of achievement in creating a unified audio experience. The quality of the individual sound effects, voice over, music, technology, and other audio elements will be considered in addition to the overall audio mix of the title". Creative/technical Academy members with expertise as a game designer, producer, audio designer, or musician are qualified to vote for this award.

The award's most recent winner is Death Stranding 2: On the Beach, developed by Kojima Productions and published by Sony Interactive Entertainment.

== History ==
The award was initially presented as the Outstanding Achievement in Sound and Music for "the integration and use of sound and/or original music in an interactive title". The first winner was PaRappa the Rapper, which was developed by NanaOn-Sha and published by Sony Computer Entertainment. Sound and Music was separated into their own categories for Outstanding Achievement in Original Music Composition and Outstanding Achievement in Sound Design during the 3rd Annual Interactive Achievement Awards. The award was renamed to its current title at the 23rd Annual D.I.C.E. Awards.

- Outstanding Achievement in Sound and Music (1998–1999)
- Outstanding Achievement in Sound Design (2000–2019)
- Outstanding Achievement in Audio Design (2020–present)

Even after the categories for sound and music were split in 2000, several games had won both categories in the same year, which included:

- Medal of Honor: Underground
- Medal of Honor: Frontline
- God of War (2005)
- BioShock
- Uncharted 2: Among Thieves
- Journey
- Destiny
- God of War (2018)
- Ghost of Tsushima
- Returnal
- God of War Ragnarök
- Marvel's Spider-Man 2
- Helldivers 2

== Winners and nominees ==
=== 1990s ===
Table key
Indicates the winner

Year	Game	Developer(s)	Publisher(s)	Ref.
1997/1998 (Note: Presented as Outstanding Achievement in Sound and Music.) (1st)	PaRappa the Rapper	NanaOn-Sha	Sony Computer Entertainment	
1997/1998 (1st)	Fallout	Interplay Productions	Interplay Productions	
1997/1998 (1st)	Interstate '76	Activision	Activision	
1997/1998 (1st)	Oddworld: Abe's Oddysee	Oddworld Inhabitants	GT Interactive	
1997/1998 (1st)	Outlaws	LucasArts	LucasArts	
1997/1998 (1st)	Star Trek: Starfleet Academy	Interplay Productions	Interplay Productions	
1998/1999 (2nd)	Road Rash 3D	Electronic Arts	Electronic Arts	
1998/1999 (2nd)	Grim Fandango	LucasArts	LucasArts	
1998/1999 (2nd)	Heart of Darkness	Amazing Studio	Interplay Productions	
1998/1999 (2nd)	Wild 9	Shiny Entertainment	Interplay Productions	
1999/2000 (3rd)	Medal of Honor	DreamWorks Interactive	Electronic Arts	
1999/2000 (3rd)	NFL 2K	Visual Concepts	Sega	
1999/2000 (3rd)	Thief: The Dark Project	Looking Glass Studios	Eidos Interactive	

=== 2000s ===
Year	Game	Developer(s)	Publisher(s)	Ref.
2000 (4th)	Medal of Honor: Underground	DreamWorks Interactive	Electronic Arts	
2000 (4th)	Deus Ex	Ion Storm	Eidos Interactive	
2000 (4th)	Jet Grind Radio	Smilebit	Sega	
2000 (4th)	The Longest Journey	Funcom	IQ Media, Empire Interactive, Tri Synergy	
2001 (5th)	Metal Gear Solid 2: Sons of Liberty	Konami	Konami	
2001 (5th)	Frequency	Harmonix	Sony Computer Entertainment	
2001 (5th)	Ico	Japan Studio	Sony Computer Entertainment	
2001 (5th)	Tom Clancy's Ghost Recon	Red Storm Entertainment	Ubisoft	
2002 (6th)	Medal of Honor: Frontline	EA Los Angeles	Electronic Arts	
2002 (6th)	Eternal Darkness: Sanity's Requiem	Silicon Knights	Nintendo	
2002 (6th)	Grand Theft Auto: Vice City	Rockstar North	Rockstar Games	
2002 (6th)	Metroid Prime	Retro Studios	Nintendo	
2002 (6th)	No One Lives Forever 2: A Spy in H.A.R.M.'s Way	Monolith Productions	Sierra Entertainment	
2002 (6th)	The Lord of the Rings: The Two Towers	Stormfront Studios	Electronic Arts	
2002 (6th)	Tom Clancy's Splinter Cell	Ubisoft Montreal	Ubisoft	
2003 (7th)	The Lord of the Rings: The Return of the King	EA Redwood Shores	Electronic Arts	
2003 (7th)	Amplitude	Harmonix	Sony Computer Entertainment	
2003 (7th)	Beyond Good & Evil	Ubisoft Montpellier	Ubisoft	
2003 (7th)	Call of Duty	Infinity Ward	Activision	
2003 (7th)	Tom Clancy's Rainbow Six 3: Raven Shield	Red Storm Entertainment	Ubisoft	
2004 (8th)	Halo 2	Bungie	Microsoft Game Studios	
2004 (8th)	Doom 3	id Software	Activision	
2004 (8th)	Ratchet & Clank: Up Your Arsenal	Insomniac Games	Sony Computer Entertainment	
2004 (8th)	Rome: Total War	Creative Assembly	Activision	
2004 (8th)	Sly 2: Band of Thieves	Sucker Punch Productions	Sony Computer Entertainment	
2005 (9th)	God of War	Santa Monica Studio	Sony Computer Entertainment	
2005 (9th)	Condemned: Criminal Origins	Monolith Productions	Sega	
2005 (9th)	F.E.A.R. (First Encounter Assault Recon)	Monolith Productions	Vivendi Universal Games, Sierra Entertainment	
2005 (9th)	King Kong	Ubisoft Montpellier	Ubisoft	
2005 (9th)	Tom Clancy's Splinter Cell: Chaos Theory	Ubisoft Montreal	Ubisoft	
2006 (10th)	Call of Duty 3	Treyarch	Activision	
2006 (10th)	Company of Heroes	Relic Entertainment	THQ	
2006 (10th)	The Elder Scrolls IV: Oblivion	Bethesda Game Studios	2K Games	
2006 (10th)	Tom Clancy's Ghost Recon Advanced Warfighter	Ubisoft Paris, Red Storm Entertainment	Ubisoft	
2006 (10th)	Tom Clancy's Splinter Cell: Double Agent	Ubisoft Shanghai	Ubisoft	
2007 (11th)	BioShock	2K Boston, 2K Australia	2K Games	
2007 (11th)	Call of Duty 4: Modern Warfare	Infinity Ward	Activision	
2007 (11th)	Need for Speed: ProStreet	EA Black Box	Electronic Arts	
2007 (11th)	Skate	EA Black Box	Electronic Arts	
2007 (11th)	Tom Clancy's Ghost Recon Advanced Warfighter 2	Ubisoft Paris, Red Storm Entertainment	Ubisoft	
2008 (12th)	Dead Space	EA Redwood Shores	Electronic Arts	
2008 (12th)	Gears of War 2	Epic Games	Microsoft Game Studios	
2008 (12th)	LittleBigPlanet	Media Molecule	Sony Computer Entertainment	
2008 (12th)	Prince of Persia	Ubisoft Montreal	Ubisoft	
2008 (12th)	Wipeout HD	Studio Liverpool	Sony Computer Entertainment	
2009 (13th)	Uncharted 2: Among Thieves	Naughty Dog	Sony Computer Entertainment	
2009 (13th)	Assassin's Creed II	Ubisoft Montreal	Ubisoft	
2009 (13th)	Call of Duty: Modern Warfare 2	Infinity Ward	Activision	
2009 (13th)	Flower	Thatgamecompany	Sony Computer Entertainment	
2009 (13th)	Skate 2	EA Black Box	Electronic Arts	

=== 2010s ===
Year	Game	Developer(s)	Publisher(s)	Ref.
2010 (14th)	Limbo	Playdead	Playdead	
2010 (14th)	Assassin's Creed: Brotherhood	Ubisoft Montreal	Ubisoft	
2010 (14th)	Battlefield: Bad Company 2	DICE	Electronic Arts	
2010 (14th)	Medal of Honor	Danger Close Games, DICE	Electronic Arts	
2010 (14th)	Red Dead Redemption	Rockstar San Diego	Rockstar Games	
2011 (15th)	Battlefield 3	DICE	Electronic Arts	
2011 (15th)	Call of Duty: Modern Warfare 3	Infinity Ward, Sledgehammer Games	Activision	
2011 (15th)	L.A. Noire	Team Bondi	Rockstar Games	
2011 (15th)	Need for Speed: The Run	EA Black Box	Electronic Arts	
2011 (15th)	Uncharted 3: Drake's Deception	Naughty Dog	Sony Computer Entertainment	
2012 (16th)	Journey	Thatgamecompany	Sony Computer Entertainment	
2012 (16th)	Assassin's Creed III	Ubisoft Montreal	Ubisoft	
2012 (16th)	Diablo III	Blizzard Entertainment	Blizzard Entertainment	
2012 (16th)	Medal of Honor: Warfighter	Danger Close Games	Electronic Arts	
2012 (16th)	Syndicate	Starbreeze Studios	Electronic Arts	
2013 (17th)	The Last of Us	Naughty Dog	Sony Computer Entertainment	
2013 (17th)	Battlefield 4	DICE	Electronic Arts	
2013 (17th)	BioShock Infinite	Irrational Games	2K Games	
2013 (17th)	God of War: Ascension	Santa Monica Studio	Sony Computer Entertainment	
2013 (17th)	Grand Theft Auto V	Rockstar North	Rockstar Games	
2014 (18th)	Destiny	Bungie	Activision	
2014 (18th)	Assassin's Creed Unity	Ubisoft Montreal	Ubisoft	
2014 (18th)	Call of Duty: Advanced Warfare	Sledgehammer Games	Activision	
2014 (18th)	Far Cry 4	Ubisoft Montreal	Ubisoft	
2014 (18th)	Valiant Hearts: The Great War	Ubisoft Montpellier	Ubisoft	
2015 (19th)	Star Wars Battlefront	DICE	Electronic Arts	
2015 (19th)	Destiny: The Taken King	Bungie	Activision	
2015 (19th)	Ori and the Blind Forest	Moon Studios	Microsoft Studios	
2015 (19th)	Rise of the Tomb Raider	Crystal Dynamics	Square Enix Europe	
2015 (19th)	The Order: 1886	Ready at Dawn	Sony Computer Entertainment	
2016 (20th)	Battlefield 1	DICE	Electronic Arts	
2016 (20th)	Inside	Playdead	Playdead	
2016 (20th)	Quantum Break	Remedy Entertainment	Microsoft Studios	
2016 (20th)	The Last Guardian	Japan Studio, GenDesign	Sony Interactive Entertainment	
2016 (20th)	Uncharted 4: A Thief's End	Naughty Dog	Sony Interactive Entertainment	
2017 (21st)	Super Mario Odyssey	Nintendo EPD	Nintendo	
2017 (21st)	Destiny 2	Bungie	Activision	
2017 (21st)	Injustice 2	NetherRealm Studios	Warner Bros. Interactive Entertainment	
2017 (21st)	Star Wars Battlefront II	DICE	Electronic Arts	
2017 (21st)	Uncharted: The Lost Legacy	Naughty Dog	Sony Interactive Entertainment	
2018 (22nd)	God of War	Santa Monica Studio	Sony Interactive Entertainment	
2018 (22nd)	Battlefield V	DICE	Electronic Arts	
2018 (22nd)	Detroit: Become Human	Quantic Dream	Sony Interactive Entertainment	
2018 (22nd)	Marvel's Spider-Man	Insomniac Games	Sony Interactive Entertainment	
2018 (22nd)	Moss	Polyarc	Polyarc	
2019 (23rd)	Death Stranding	Kojima Productions	Sony Interactive Entertainment	
2019 (23rd)	Call of Duty: Modern Warfare	Infinity Ward	Activision	
2019 (23rd)	Mortal Kombat 11	NetherRealm Studios	Warner Bros. Interactive Entertainment	
2019 (23rd)	Resident Evil 2	Capcom	Capcom	
2019 (23rd)	Sayonara Wild Hearts	Simogo	Annapurna Interactive	

=== 2020s ===
Year	Game	Developer(s)	Publisher(s)	Ref.
2020 (24th)	Ghost of Tsushima	Sucker Punch Productions	Sony Interactive Entertainment	
2020 (24th)	Dreams	Media Molecule	Sony Interactive Entertainment	
2020 (24th)	The Last of Us Part II	Naughty Dog	Sony Interactive Entertainment	
2020 (24th)	Ori and the Will of the Wisps	Moon Studios	Xbox Game Studios	
2020 (24th)	Sackboy: A Big Adventure	Sumo Digital	Sony Interactive Entertainment	
2021 (25th)	Returnal	Housemarque	Sony Interactive Entertainment	
2021 (25th)	Forza Horizon 5	Playground Games	Xbox Game Studios	
2021 (25th)	Halo Infinite	343 Industries	Xbox Game Studios	
2021 (25th)	It Takes Two	Hazelight Studios	Electronic Arts	
2021 (25th)	Ratchet & Clank: Rift Apart	Insomniac Games	Sony Interactive Entertainment	
2022 (26th)	God of War Ragnarök	Santa Monica Studio	Sony Interactive Entertainment	
2022 (26th)	A Plague Tale: Requiem	Asobo Studio	Focus Entertainment	
2022 (26th)	Call of Duty: Modern Warfare II	Infinity Ward	Activision	
2022 (26th)	Gotham Knights	WB Games Montréal	Warner Bros. Games	
2022 (26th)	Somerville	Jumpship	Jumpship	
2023 (27th)	Marvel's Spider-Man 2	Insomniac Games	Sony Interactive Entertainment	
2023 (27th)	Alan Wake 2	Remedy Entertainment	Epic Games	
2023 (27th)	Cocoon	Geometric Interactive	Annapurna Interactive	
2023 (27th)	Hi-Fi Rush	Tango Gameworks	Bethesda Softworks	
2023 (27th)	Star Wars Jedi: Survivor	Respawn Entertainment	Electronic Arts	
2024 (28th)	Helldivers 2	Arrowhead Game Studios	Sony Interactive Entertainment	
2024 (28th)	Frostpunk 2	11 Bit Studios	11 Bit Studios	
2024 (28th)	Monument Valley 3	ustwo	Netflix Games	
2024 (28th)	Senua's Saga: Hellblade II	Ninja Theory	Xbox Game Studios	
2024 (28th)	Still Wakes the Deep	The Chinese Room	Secret Mode	
2025 (29th)	Death Stranding 2: On the Beach	Kojima Productions	Sony Interactive Entertainment	
2025 (29th)	ARC Raiders	Embark Studios	Embark Studios	
2025 (29th)	Ghost of Yōtei	Sucker Punch Productions	Sony Interactive Entertainment	
2025 (29th)	Lumines Arise	Enhance Games	Monstars	
2025 (29th)	Split Fiction	Hazelight Studios	Electronic Arts	

== Multiple nominations and wins ==
=== Developers and publishers ===
Sony has published the most nominees, as well as the most winners in this category. Sony has the longest publisher-winning streak in this category, having won the award for eight consecutive years (2019 to 2026). Sony also has the record for publishing the most nominees in a single year, with four nods at the 24th Annual D.I.C.E. Awards.

Electronic Arts developer DICE and Ubisoft Montreal have developed the most nominees, with DICE and Sony's Santa Monica Studio having developed the most winners in the category. DICE and DreamWorks Interactive are the only developers with back-to-back wins for the award. Ubisoft has published the most nominees without having a single winner, while Ubisoft Montreal has developed the most nominees without a winner as well. Ubisoft Montreal is also one of the few studios that have developed more than one nominee for a single year; the other studios are Interplay Productions, Monolith Productions, and EA Black Box.

Developers
Developer	Nominations	Wins
DICE	8	3
Santa Monica Studio	4	3
Naughty Dog	6	2
DreamWorks Interactive/EA Los Angeles/Danger Close Games	5	2
Bungie	4	2
EA Redwood Shores	2	2
Kojima Productions	2	2
Insomniac Games	4	1
Sucker Punch Productions	3	1
2K Boston/Irrational Games	2	1
Playdead	2	1
Thatgamecompany	2	1
Ubisoft Montreal	8	0
Infinity Ward	6	0
EA Black Box	4	0
Red Storm Entertainment	4	0
Monolith Productions	3	0
Ubisoft Montpellier	3	0
Hazelight Studios	2	0
Interplay Productions	2	0
Harmonix	2	0
Japan Studio	2	0
LucasArts	2	0
Media Molecule	2	0
Moon Studios	2	0
NetherRealm Studios	2	0
Remedy Entertainment	2	0
Rockstar North	2	0
Sledgehammer Games	2	0
Ubisoft Paris	2	0

Publishers
Publisher	Nominations	Wins
Sony Computer/Interactive Entertainment	34	13
Electronic Arts	24	9
Activision	14	2
Microsoft/Xbox Game Studios	8	1
2K Games	3	1
Nintendo	3	1
Playdead	2	1
Ubisoft	15	0
Interplay Productions	4	0
Eidos Interactive/Square Enix Europe	3	0
Rockstar Games	3	0
Sega	3	0
Warner Bros. Interactive Entertainment/Warner Bros. Games	3	0
Annapurna Interactive	2	0
LucasArts	2	0

=== Franchises ===
The most nominated franchise has been Call of Duty, while God of War and Medal of Honor have been the most award-winning franchises. Battlefield and Death Stranding are the only other franchises to have won more than once. The Tom Clancy franchise has the most nominations without winning a single award, and is the only franchise with more than one nominee in one year.

Franchises
Franchises	Nominations	Wins
Medal of Honor	5	3
God of War	4	3
Battlefield	5	2
Death Stranding	2	2
Call of Duty	8	1
Uncharted	4	1
Destiny	3	1
Star Wars	3	1
BioShock	2	1
Ghost	2	1
Halo	2	1
Marvel's Spider-Man	2	1
The Last of Us	2	1
The Lord of the Rings	2	1
Tom Clancy's	7	0
Assassin's Creed	4	0
Frequency (Note: Amplitude is the sequel to Frequency.)	2	0
Grand Theft Auto	2	0
LittleBigPlanet (Note: Sackboy: A Big Adventure is a spin-off of the LittleBigPlanet franchise.)	2	0
Need for Speed	2	0
Ori	2	0
Ratchet & Clank	2	0
Skate	2	0
