= Moss: Book II =

2022 video game

- Developer: Polyarc
- Publisher: Polyarc
- Director: Argus Hulin
- Designer: Joshua Stiksma
- Programmer: Mike Felice
- Artist: Mike Jensen
- Writer: Shauna Sperry
- Composer: Jason Graves
- Engine: Unreal Engine
- Platforms: PlayStation 4; Meta Quest 2; Windows; PlayStation 5; Moss: The Forgotten Relic; PlayStation 5; Windows; Nintendo Switch; Nintendo Switch 2; Xbox Series X/S
- Release: PlayStation 4; March 31, 2022; Meta Quest 2; July 21, 2022; Windows; October 20, 2022; PlayStation 5; February 22, 2023; Moss: The Forgotten Relic; July 16, 2026
- Genres: Adventure, puzzle
- Mode: Single-player

Moss: Book II is a 2022 virtual reality adventure game developed and published by Polyarc. A sequel to Moss, the game follows Quill as she ventures though the land to battle the arcane to save the land of Moss. Moss: Book II was released in March 2022 for PlayStation 4 via PlayStation VR before receiving Meta Quest 2 and Windows ports later that year. A PlayStation 5 version via PlayStation VR2 was released in February 2023.

A remade version of Moss: Book II was bundled with its predecessor in a compilation titled Moss: The Forgotten Relic. It does not require a VR headset and was released for PlayStation 5, Xbox Series X/S, Nintendo Switch, Nintendo Switch 2, and Windows in July 2026.

== Gameplay ==
The game is similar to its predecessor, but has some key additions. The player again controllers the Reader, who helps guide Quill through different areas and solve puzzles. The Reader can now create vine bridges and destroy objects by gripping them. Quill now has the ability to climb, allowing for more verticality in the levels, alongside new weapons, like the hammer. The hammer requires the reader to lift it up in the air to hit enemies.

== Development ==
The game was developed by Polyarc. They stated the goal was to create an experience that would take advantage of the medium's strengths and not be able to be replicated "if you played on Steam... on a flat monitor". The team stated that they didn't want to reinvent the formula, making their foundation "Don't mess up what we figured out for the first one, we landed in a really good spot". According to Polyarc, players frequently said they wanted a bigger world and more variation in environments, and so effort was put into expanding the scope. The game was also designed to be more open, with backtracking through previous areas and collectibles hidden throughout levels. For the Meta Quest 2 port, the team focused on optimizing what materials and shaders were used, with specific cuts being made to maintain performance. Attention was given to making sure the game wouldn't make players motion sick, with the player stationary in the game, and the cuts between different areas relying on a fade to black. Puzzles were designed to not be overly complicated, as to not make the player take off the headset to look up a solution.

== Reception ==
Reception

Aggregate score
Aggregator	Score
Metacritic	(PS4) 83/100 (PS5) 90/100

Review scores
Publication	Score
Digital Trends	4/5
Eurogamer	Recommended
Hardcore Gamer	4/5
IGN	8/10
NME	4/5
Push Square	8/10
Android Central	4/5
Game Rant	3.5/5
Road to VR	8.5/10
UploadVR	Recommended

The PlayStation 4 version of Moss: Book II received "generally favorable reviews", and the PlayStation 5 version received "universal acclaim", according to Metacritic.

Road to VR enjoyed the visual improvements over the game's predecessor, saying that, "Each segment is a beautifully detailed diorama with masterful attention to lighting and composition". Android Central liked the bigger scope of Book II, but felt that the PSVR's aging hardware held back the title, with its limited tracking making it difficult to move the controller around. IGN praised the expanded combat options, and the way the new weapons factored into platforming, "Not only does it elevate combat beyond simply swinging a sword, puzzles also use each ability creatively". UploadVR criticized the short length of the title, saying that "the game ends just as its best ideas are starting to be put through their paces, with further potential left unexplored". While Eurogamer felt the addition of only one new enemy type limited the gameplay possiblites, they praised the new additions to the franchise, "the emotional twists and the new gameplay mechanics introduced later on ensured I was left wanting more by the end".

The game won the Best VR/AR Game Award at The Game Awards 2022.

=== Accolades ===
Date	Award	Category	Result	Ref.
December 8, 2022	The Game Awards	Best VR/AR Game	Won	
January 17, 2023	New York Game Awards	Coney Island Dreamland Award for Best AR/VR Game	Won	
January 17, 2023	New York Game Awards	Central Park Children's Zoo Award for Best Kids Game	Nominated	
February 24, 2023	D.I.C.E. Awards	Immersive Reality Game of the Year	Nominated	
February 24, 2023	D.I.C.E. Awards	Immersive Reality Technical Achievement	Nominated	
February 24, 2023	D.I.C.E. Awards	Outstanding Achievement in Animation	Nominated	
February 24, 2023	D.I.C.E. Awards	Outstanding Achievement in Original Music Composition	Nominated	
February 25, 2023	Annie Awards	Best Character Animation – Video Game	Nominated	
March 23, 2023	Game Audio Network Guild Awards	Best Audio for an Indie Game	Won	
March 23, 2023	Game Audio Network Guild Awards	Best Music for an Indie Game	Won	
March 23, 2023	Game Audio Network Guild Awards	Best Dialogue for an Indie Game	Won	
