= Moss (video game) =

2018 video game

- Developer: Polyarc
- Publisher: Polyarc
- Composer: Jason Graves
- Engine: Unreal Engine 4 Unreal Engine 5 (PS5)
- Platforms: PlayStation 4; Windows; Oculus Quest; PlayStation 5; Moss: The Forgotten Relic; PlayStation 5; Windows; Nintendo Switch; Nintendo Switch 2; Xbox Series X/S
- Release: PlayStation 4; February 27, 2018; Windows; June 7, 2018; Oculus Quest; May 21, 2019; PlayStation 5; February 22, 2023; Moss: The Forgotten Relic; July 16, 2026
- Genres: Adventure, puzzle
- Mode: Single-player

Moss is a virtual reality adventure game developed and published by Polyarc. The game is presented from a blend of first-person and third-person perspectives, with a primary focus on solving puzzles.

Moss was released for the PlayStation 4 in February 2018. In June, a PC version featuring high-resolution graphics was released. A PlayStation 5 version was released in February 2023 for the PlayStation VR2. A non-VR version, Moss: The Forgotten Relic, was released in July 2026.

== Plot ==
While in a library, the reader finds an old book. As they flip through pages, the reader is transported to a fantasy land contained within the book. The reader meets Quill, a young mouse, and begins an adventure. The kingdom where Quill lives has been overthrown by Sarffog, a fire-breathing snake. After Quill's uncle is captured, the reader guides Quill on an adventure to defeat Sarffog and save her uncle.

== Gameplay ==
Moss is an adventure game viewed from the third-person perspective using the VR (HTC Vive, Oculus Rift, Oculus Quest, PSVR) headset. The player is shown in the game as a masked face and orb. Unlike most games, Quill is aware of the player (the Reader). The player controls Quill, navigating environments and battling enemies. The player also can manipulate the environment to navigate obstacles and solve puzzles. Quill communicates with the player through the use of American Sign Language (ASL) for puzzle hints and emotional responses.

The player can change positions to have different perspectives of the world, leaning to see around buildings or standing up and getting an aerial view. There are collectible scrolls that only can be found by changing positions and exploring parts of the world that normally cannot be seen.

On May 21, 2019, a free DLC with additional environments, challenges, storytelling, new puzzles, combat, and weaponry was released.

== Reception ==
Reception

Aggregate score
Aggregator	Score
Metacritic	PS4: 85/100; PC: 81/100

Review scores
Publication	Score
Destructoid	9/10
Edge	7/10
Electronic Gaming Monthly	4/5
Game Informer	7.75/10
GameSpot	8/10
IGN	8.4/10
VentureBeat	90/100
Digital Trends	9/10

According to Metacritic, Moss received generally favorable reviews. In reviews, both Digital Trends and VentureBeat praised the interaction with Quill and the world design. Both also stated that the game length was on the short side.

In a 2017 article, Mike Fahey of Kotaku noted the positive response to Quill's design and use of sign language.

On August 3, 2018, video game record label Materia Collective released the soundtrack digitally, as well as on compact disc and vinyl.

=== Accolades ===
Year	Award	Category	Result	Ref.
2017	Game Critics Awards	Best VR Game	Nominated	
2018	The Independent Game Developers' Association Awards	Best Action and Adventure Game	Nominated	
2018	The Independent Game Developers' Association Awards	Best Start-up	Nominated	
2018	Golden Joystick Awards	Best VR Game	Nominated	
2018	Golden Joystick Awards	PlayStation Game of the Year	Nominated	
2018	The Game Awards 2018	Best VR/AR Game	Nominated	
2018	The Game Awards 2018	Best Debut Indie Game	Nominated	
2018	Gamers' Choice Awards	Fan Favorite VR Game	Nominated	
2019	New York Game Awards	Central Park Children's Zoo Award for Best Kids Game	Nominated	
2019	New York Game Awards	Coney Island Dreamland Award for Best Virtual Reality Game	Nominated	
2019	46th Annie Awards	Best Virtual Reality Production	Nominated	
2019	46th Annie Awards	Character Animation in a Video Game	Nominated	
2019	22nd Annual D.I.C.E. Awards	Immersive Reality Game of the Year	Nominated	
2019	22nd Annual D.I.C.E. Awards	Outstanding Achievement in Animation	Nominated	
2019	22nd Annual D.I.C.E. Awards	Outstanding Achievement in Sound Design	Nominated	
2019	National Academy of Video Game Trade Reviewers Awards	Control Design, VR	Won	
2019	National Academy of Video Game Trade Reviewers Awards	Direction in Virtual Reality	Won	
2019	National Academy of Video Game Trade Reviewers Awards	Sound Mixing in Virtual Reality	Nominated	
2019	SXSW Gaming Awards	VR Game of the Year	Nominated	
2019	Independent Games Festival Awards	Excellence in Audio	Nominated	
2019	Game Developers Choice Awards	Best Debut (Polyarc)	Nominated	
2019	Game Developers Choice Awards	Best VR/AR Game	Nominated	
2019	2019 G.A.N.G. Awards	Audio of the Year	Nominated	
2019	2019 G.A.N.G. Awards	Music of the Year	Nominated	
2019	2019 G.A.N.G. Awards	Sound Design of the Year	Nominated	
2019	2019 G.A.N.G. Awards	Best Dialogue	Nominated	
2019	2019 G.A.N.G. Awards	Best Original Instrumental ("Legends Old and New")	Nominated	
2019	2019 G.A.N.G. Awards	Best Original Song ("Home to Me")	Nominated	
2019	2019 G.A.N.G. Awards	Best Sound Design for an Indie Game	Won	
2019	2019 G.A.N.G. Awards	Best Music for an Indie Game	Won	
2019	2019 G.A.N.G. Awards	Best VR Audio	Won	
2019	15th British Academy Games Awards	Game Innovation	Nominated	
2019	15th British Academy Games Awards	Original Property	Nominated	

== Legacy ==
A sequel, Moss: Book II, was announced by Polyarc during Sony's State of Play in 2021 and was released on March 31, 2022.

The 2024 game Astro Bot features a bot cameo of the main character Quill as part of the game's celebration of PlayStation's history. Quill can also be bought as an official avatar in VRChat.

In May 2026, Polyarc announced that both Moss titles would be bundled and remade into a single game for non-VR devices called Moss: The Forgotten Relic. This compilation was released on PlayStation 5, Xbox Series X/S, Nintendo Switch, Nintendo Switch 2, and Windows on July 16, 2026.
