= God of War (2018 video game) =

Action-adventure game

- Developer: Santa Monica Studio (Note: Windows version ported by Jetpack Interactive)
- Publisher: Sony Interactive Entertainment
- Director: Cory Barlog
- Producers: Yumi Yang; Elizabeth Dahm Wang; Sean Llewellyn; Chad Cox; Eric Fong
- Designer: Derek Daniels
- Programmer: Florian Strauss
- Writers: Matt Sophos; Richard Zangrande Gaubert; Cory Barlog
- Composer: Bear McCreary
- Series: God of War
- Platforms: PlayStation 4; Windows
- Release: PlayStation 4; April 20, 2018; Windows; January 14, 2022
- Genres: Action-adventure, hack and slash
- Mode: Single-player

God of War (Note: Colloquially referred to as God of War 4, God of War IV, God of War PS4, and God of War 2018) is a 2018 action-adventure game developed by Santa Monica Studio and published by Sony Interactive Entertainment. It was released worldwide for the PlayStation 4 in April 2018, with a Windows port released in January 2022. It is the eighth game in the God of War series, tenth chronologically, and the sequel to 2010's God of War III.

While previous games were based on Greek mythology, God of War transitioned to Norse mythology, and takes places in mythical ancient Scandinavia in the realm of Midgard. Players control Kratos, who embarks on a journey with his son, Atreus, to scatter the ashes of Atreus's mother from the highest peak of the nine realms. Kratos keeps his past a secret from Atreus, who is unaware he is a demigod. Along their journey, they come into conflict with monsters and gods of the Norse world.

Described by creative director Cory Barlog as a reimagining of the franchise, a major gameplay change is that Kratos now uses a magical battle axe, the Leviathan Axe, instead of his signature double-chained blades. The game also uses an over-the-shoulder free camera, with the game in one shot, as opposed to the fixed cinematic camera of the previous entries. It also includes role-playing game elements, and Kratos's son Atreus provides assistance in combat. The majority of the original game's development team worked on God of War and designed it to be accessible and grounded. A short text-based game, A Call from the Wilds, was released in February 2018 through Facebook Messenger and follows Atreus on his first adventure. A smartphone app, Mímir's Vision, was released three days before the release, providing additional information about the Norse setting.

God of War received acclaim for its story, world design, art direction, music, graphics, combat system, and characters, in particular the dynamic between Kratos and Atreus. Many reviewers felt it had successfully revitalized the series without losing its core identity. It was named Game of the Year by numerous media outlets and award shows, and has been cited as among the greatest video games. It sold more than five million copies within a month of release and had sold 23 million by November 2022, making it one of the best-selling PlayStation 4 games and the best-selling game in the series. A novelization was released in August 2018, followed by a prequel comic series published from November 2018 to June 2021, while a live-action television series is in development for Amazon Prime Video. A sequel, God of War Ragnarök, was released for the PlayStation 4 and PlayStation 5 in 2022, and for Windows in 2024.

== Gameplay ==
God of War is an action-adventure game. Unlike the previous games, which mostly use a fixed cinematic camera, it uses an over-the-shoulder camera. It is presented in a continuous shot, with no camera cuts or loading screens. Although the previous main installment, Ascension (2013), introduced multiplayer to the series, this installment is single-player-only. Regarding the level structure, creative director Cory Barlog said "it's open, but it is not an open world." Due to its openness, a fast travel feature is unlocked later. Swimming, an ability in previous games, was cut; players instead use a boat to traverse bodies of water. Unlike previous games, which allowed players to jump freely at any time, jumping can now only be done at designated areas, such as at a rock face or ledge. Players battle Norse mythological foes, like dark elves, wulvers, and draugrs, as well as Gullveig and the revenants, beings warped by seiðr magic, among many others. Valkyries appear as optional secret boss battles throughout the six playable locations. Among the many side quests, players can free the imprisoned dragons Fáfnir, Otr, and Reginn—dwarves who were turned into dragons—in addition to battling one called Hræzlyr, a story-based boss battle.

A GIF showing Kratos throwing the Leviathan Axe to magically freeze an enemy draugr in place, allowing Kratos to easily attack it. The in-game HUD can be seen in the bottom left and right corners. The left shows information for Kratos, such as his health and what runic attacks are equipped. The right shows similar information for Atreus.

The player controls the character Kratos in combo-based combat and puzzle game elements. The gameplay was completely rebuilt from previous games. A major change is that Kratos no longer uses his signature double-chained blades, the Blades of Chaos, as his default weapon. Instead, he uses a magical battle axe called the Leviathan Axe, which is infused with ice elemental magic. The axe can be thrown at enemies and magically summoned back to his hand, similar to Thor's hammer Mjölnir. Larger enemies have precision targets which stun the enemy if hit. The weapon can also be thrown at objects to freeze or move mechanisms, or trigger damaging explosions, until returned to Kratos's hand. The axe has standard light and heavy attacks. Over time, it can be upgraded with runes to allow for light and heavy magical "runic" attacks. This provides players with a variety of options to cater to their own play style. Another new weapon is the collapsible Guardian Shield, which appears as a vambrace on his arm when not in use. The shield can be used offensively or defensively, similar to the Golden Fleece in previous games. Kratos also utilizes hand-to-hand combat, a feature originally introduced in Ascension. The Blades of Chaos, infused with fire elemental magic, are acquired later via a plot device and perform in a similar manner as in previous installments—they are a pair of blades attached to chains that can be swung around in various maneuvers. The weapon can also be upgraded with magical runic attacks.

As in the earlier games, there is a "Rage" ability, this one called Spartan Rage. Like in previous games, the Rage ability has a meter that gradually fills during combat. With this ability, Kratos uses powerful bare-handed attacks, as opposed to weapons, to greatly damage enemies. The game also features role-playing game (RPG) elements. There are crafting resources for the player to find that allow them to create new or upgrade existing armor with better perks. Players also accumulate a currency called Hacksilver, a key component in crafting and purchasing new items. Experience points (XP) are used for learning new combat skills. Players find chests containing random items, such as enchantments for improving armor and weapons, as well as the Hacksilver currency. There are also two special items, Iðunn's Apples and horns of Blood Mead, which increase Kratos's maximum health and Rage, respectively. These meters are replenished by green and red orbs dropped by downed foes and found throughout the game world. For the magical runic attacks, instead of collecting blue orbs to replenish the ability (like in the previous games), there is a cooldown timer for each ability.

Quick time events have changed from previous games. Enemies display two meters above their heads, one for health (the color of which indicates the enemy's difficulty) and the other for stun. Filling the stun meter helps to defeat more difficult enemies. When the stun meter is full, a grab prompt will appear. Depending on the enemy, Kratos may rip them in half or grab them and throw them into other enemies, among other possible outcomes. Although the game is played entirely as Kratos, there are times when the player may choose to passively control his son, Atreus. One button is dedicated to Atreus, and its use depends on the context. For example, if the player needs assistance, they can look at an enemy and press the button, and Atreus will shoot an arrow at the enemy. Over the course of the game, Atreus helps in combat, traversal, exploration, and puzzle-solving. When facing a large number of enemies, he distracts the weaker ones as Kratos fights the stronger ones. If too many enemies gang up on Atreus, he is briefly stunned, but he cannot be knocked out or killed. Atreus also acquires new skills, armor, and runic attacks, as well as special light and shock arrows for his bow. Atreus's runic attacks summon different spectral animals with different abilities. For example, one summons a pack of wolves that attacks enemies, while another summons the squirrel Ratatoskr, who will dig up health and rage orbs.

== Synopsis ==
=== Setting ===
While the first seven games were loosely based on Greek mythology, this installment is loosely inspired by Norse mythology, taking place at least 150 years after God of War III (2010). Six of the nine realms of Norse mythology can be explored. Predating the Vikings, most of the game takes place in ancient Scandinavia in the realm of Midgard, which is inhabited by humans and other creatures. It is the same realm in which the Greek world existed. As more dangerous creatures began appearing, many humans fled. Other realms visited as part of the story include Alfheim, the mystical home of the light and dark elves; Helheim, the icy land of the dead; and Jötunheim, the mountainous land of the Giants. Optional explorable realms include Niflheim, a realm of poisonous fog with a maze-like structure of rewards; and the fire realm Muspelheim, featuring the six Trials of Muspelheim—completing each trial grants rewards and advances Kratos and Atreus closer to the top of a large volcano, facing off Göndul, one of the nine Valkyries. Access to the other three realms—Asgard, home of the Æsir gods; Vanaheim, home of the Vanir gods; and Svartalfheim, home of the dwarves—has been blocked by Odin, the ruler of Asgard and the Æsir gods. At the center of the realms is the mythical tree Yggdrasil, which connects each realm. Although each realm is a different world, they exist simultaneously in the same space. Travel to and from realms can be done by using the Bifröst from a root of Yggdrasil contained within Týr's Temple at the center of the Lake of the Nine. The temple was created by its namesake, Týr, a peaceful God of War who traveled to other lands and learned about their mythologies; it was told that Odin had him killed as he believed Týr was secretly aiding the Giants and would try to overthrow him.

=== Characters ===
Kratos (Christopher Judge) is a warrior from Sparta who became the Greek God of War and is a son of Zeus. After ending up in ancient Scandinavia following his war against Olympus, he met his second wife, Laufey (addressed as Faye), who died from an unknown cause. Their son, Atreus (Sunny Suljic)., does not know about Kratos's past or his divine nature but can hear other beings' thoughts. The main antagonist is the Æsir god Baldur (Jeremy Davies), the half-brother of Thor, whose sons Modi and Magni (Nolan North and Troy Baker, respectively) assist him. Baldur's parents are Odin, the Allfather and King of the Æsir, and the Vanir goddess Freya (Danielle Bisutti), the former Queen of the Valkyries. Freya tried leaving Odin after he began corrupting her Vanir magic, but he in turn stripped her of her Valkyrie wings, banished her to Midgard, and cast a spell on her that prevented her from causing harm to others and from leaving the realm. She then hid her identity under an alias, the Witch of the Woods. To protect her son from a prophecy that foretold his death, Freya cast a spell of immortality on Baldur, which also prevented him from feeling pain or pleasure. The effects of the spell caused Baldur to greatly resent his mother. The only thing capable of harming him was mistletoe, a fact which Freya kept secret.

Other characters include Mímir (Alastair Duncan), who claims to be the smartest man alive, and the Huldra Brothers—Brok (Robert Craighead) and Sindri (Adam J. Harrington)—dwarves who appear at various points in the world and assist Kratos and Atreus by forging new gear. Weapons forged by the Huldra Brothers, including Thor's hammer Mjölnir, were used by the Æsir gods. They also forged Kratos's Leviathan Axe, which originally belonged to Faye, who also gifted Kratos her Guardian Shield. The spirit of the Greek goddess Athena (Carole Ruggier) (Note: Carole Ruggier had previously voiced Athena in the original God of War (2005) and God of War II (2007), but was replaced by Erin Torpey in subsequent games.) makes a cameo appearance, and Zeus (Corey Burton) (Note: Corey Burton reprised the role, having previously voiced Zeus in God of War II (2007), God of War III (2010), and God of War: Ascension (2013).) appears to Kratos as an illusion in Helheim.

=== Plot ===
Many years after defeating the Olympian gods, (Note: As depicted in God of War III (2010)) Kratos has been living with his wife Faye and their son Atreus in Midgard. Soon after Faye dies, Kratos cremates her body, and is confronted by a stranger with godly powers. The two battle and Kratos seemingly kills the stranger, after which Kratos and Atreus begin their journey to honor Faye's last wish: to scatter her ashes at the highest peak in the nine realms. They encounter the Dwarves Brok and Sindri, the kindly Witch of the Woods, who recognizes Kratos's godhood, and Jörmungandr, the World Serpent. When their path is blocked by impenetrable black mist, the Witch instructs them to travel to Alfheim and secure its magical light to extinguish the mist. Successful, they reach Midgard's peak and overhear a conversation between the stranger—revealed to be Baldur—and his nephews, Modi and Magni, as well as the imprisoned Mímir. Mímir reveals the highest peak is actually in Jötunheim, but the Giants have blocked travel there.

Knowing of another passage, Mímir instructs Kratos to behead him and have his head revived by the Witch of the Woods, whom, upon resurrection, he reveals to be the goddess Freya. Kratos's longstanding hatred of gods causes him to distrust her, but both Freya and Mímir warn him he must tell Atreus about his true nature. Kratos, Atreus, and Mímir are attacked by Modi and Magni. After Kratos kills Magni, Modi flees but later ambushes the trio. Kratos fends him off, but Atreus collapses, overcome by illness due to the contradiction of a god believing himself to be mortal. Freya instructs Kratos to retrieve the heart of a troll in Helheim; however, his frost-based Leviathan Axe is useless in the icy realm. Kratos returns home to unearth his old weapons, the fiery Blades of Chaos, and is haunted by Athena's spirit. After retrieving the heart, he has a haunting vision of Zeus. Freya revives Atreus, and Kratos tells him they are gods. Atreus becomes increasingly arrogant and, against Kratos's orders, murders a weakened Modi, who was beaten by Thor for not avenging Magni. At Midgard's peak, Baldur ambushes Kratos and Atreus, resulting in Jötunheim's portal being destroyed. Their battle descends to Týr's Temple, and the group ends up in Helheim.

Atreus makes amends with Kratos after being reprimanded. They learn of Freya and Baldur's familial relationship and the spell of invulnerability she cast on him. Returning to Midgard, Mímir realizes another way to reach Jötunheim, but needs his missing eye. After obtaining it, the group are attacked by Baldur once more, but Freya intervenes to protect her son. Baldur is pierced by Atreus's mistletoe arrow, breaking Freya's spell. Though defeated, Kratos spares him on the condition he leave both them and Freya alone; Baldur attempts to strangle Freya, causing Kratos to kill him. A grief-stricken Freya vows revenge on Kratos, and leaves with Baldur's corpse, but not before taunting him about the past he has not yet told his son. Kratos tells Atreus about his own past and how he killed many people including his own father. Atreus laments this cycle of violence, and Kratos tells him they should not repeat the mistakes of their predecessors, including those made by Kratos himself.

Kratos and Atreus reach Jötunheim. They find an abandoned temple with a mural depicting their adventures, showing that the Giants, renowned for their gift of prophecy, had foretold their journey. They discover Faye was a Giant who had decided to stay in Midgard, making Atreus half Giant, one-quarter god, and one-quarter mortal. Their fight with Baldur is shown, revealing he sought Faye the whole time under Odin's orders, unaware she was dead and Atreus was referred to as Loki by his mother and the Giants. Kratos chooses to ignore a covered mural depicting what appears to be him dying in Atreus's arms. They fulfill their promise and spread Faye's ashes at the peak. Afterward, Kratos reveals to Atreus that his given name was that of a compassionate Spartan comrade. (Note: This Atreus appears in God of War Sons of Sparta (2026).) Returning to Midgard, they retrieve Mímir, who warns them Baldur's death has caused the three-year-long Fimbulwinter to begin nearly a century earlier than prophesized, meaning Ragnarök is soon to follow. At home, the pair sleep, and Atreus has a vision of Thor arriving at the end of Fimbulwinter to confront them.

== Development ==
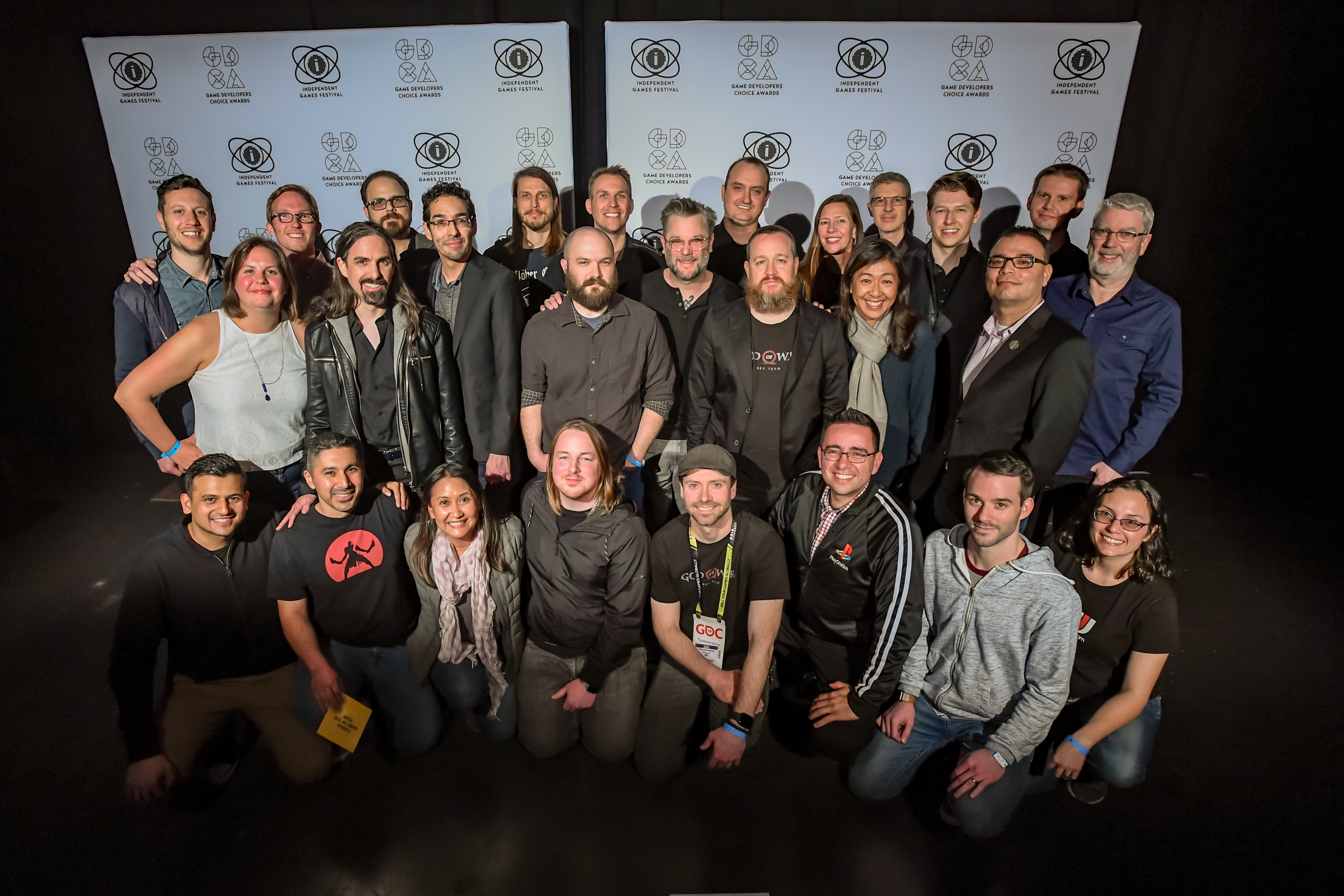
The Santa Monica Studio team behind God of War at the 2019 Game Developers Choice Awards

Development on the next God of War began in 2014. This was confirmed by Santa Monica Studio's creative director Cory Barlog at the inaugural PlayStation Experience on December 6 that year, where Barlog said it was in early development and that it would not be a prequel but possibly a reboot. In April 2016, concept art was leaked that showed images of Kratos in the world of Norse mythology, a concept originally considered by series creator David Jaffe after Kratos eliminated the Greek gods. The official announcement came at E3 2016, with a gameplay demo that confirmed the setting. The demo showed a fully bearded Kratos teaching his son how to hunt. The pair also battled a troll. The end of the demo showed the title God of War and confirmed it was in development for the PlayStation 4 (PS4). The E3 announcement also confirmed that Barlog had returned to the series as game director for the new installment. Since the original God of War (2005), Barlog had been a major contributor in the development of the series, previously most notably as the director of God of War II (2007); this installment was his fifth God of War game.

Barlog said the title God of War with no numeral or subtitle was chosen because, although it was a continuation of the series, "we ... [reimagined] everything". Head of Santa Monica Studio, Shannon Studstill, and Barlog said that Sony Interactive Entertainment had to be convinced to do another God of War game as many people at Sony wanted the series to "sleep and rest" due to the lackluster response to the previous game, Ascension. In explaining why Barlog was brought back, Studstill said he knew the series very well, "and bringing in someone that understands that history is the respect the franchise deserves". Barlog responded, "You gotta know the rules to break the rules." Series creator David Jaffe was also considered but was unavailable.

In explaining the transition from Greek mythology to Norse mythology, Barlog said: "It's kind of this BC–AD change over kind of thing. We're moving and starting from zero and kind of moving forward on that". In adapting the Norse myths, Barlog said there were many different translations and interpretations, and the writing team read the Prose Edda to learn how the myths were translated and told. Just like they did with Greek mythology in the previous games, they found ways to parallel path things from the Norse myths to fit their story. Before settling on Norse mythology, Egyptian mythology was also considered. Barlog said that half of the team was for it, but because Egypt has "a lot more about civilization – it's less isolated, less barren", he decided on the Norse setting to keep the focus on Kratos. Barlog explained further: "Having too much around distracts from that central theme of a stranger in a strange land". To explain why Kratos was now in the Norse world, Barlog said that different cultures' belief systems coexisted, but they were "separated by geography", suggesting that Kratos traveled from Greece to Norway (Scandinavia) after the conclusion of God of War III. Clarifying the conclusion of that game, Barlog said that Kratos did not destroy what was believed to be the entire world, but only the portion ruled over by the Greek pantheon. Barlog also said the newer game predated the Vikings, taking place in the time when their gods walked the Earth.

Most of the development team that worked on the original God of War worked on the new installment. They said they matched the new gameplay with the same accessibility as the previous installments. It was confirmed that the game would not feature any morality system or branching story; all players have the same story experience. The developers also confirmed that some of the more controversial minigames found in previous entries (such as one featuring sex) would not return. The enemy count was increased to up to 100 enemies on-screen, although this limit is never approached; God of War III and Ascension had up to 50. Some gameplay characteristics such as jumping, swimming, and instant-death platforming challenges found in the previous installments were cut because of the camera being closer to Kratos. Although the previous installment, Ascension, introduced multiplayer to the series, the team decided to forgo it and focus on the single-player experience. In changing the gameplay, Studstill said, "I felt like, in order to reinvent, we really needed to turn a lot of things around". With regard to the camera change, Barlog said they wanted a more intimate and player-controlled experience.

The entire game is played in a single shot with no camera cuts; there are no loading screens and no fades to black between gameplay and cutscenes. Barlog said about forty percent of the team did not originally agree with this decision due to the increased work and production to implement the feature, especially since this was the first time that a one-shot technique was being used for a three-dimensional AAA game. This meant Barlog had no examples to show if this would work or was a good idea. (Note: Games like Metal Gear Solid V: The Phantom Pain (2015) and Hellblade: Senua's Sacrifice (2017), both in development around the same time as God of War, utilized similar one-shot techniques.) After the team played through the finished game, Barlog said they finally understood his vision and said it was a feature they should use from now on. Barlog had originally pitched the idea for a one-shot camera while he was at Crystal Dynamics working on Tomb Raider (2013), but he was turned down. Sony, however, was much more supportive of Barlog's creative ideas. Furthermore, Barlog and lead level designer Rob Davis were also influenced by the Resident Evil series, particularly Resident Evil 4 (2005)'s "combination of poised camera exploration and scavenging" and Resident Evil 7 (2017)'s "strong vision" from a team making "bold decisions, and actually hav[ing] the audience follow them". Barlog noted how there was initial disagreement over the camera distance. He wanted it close whereas the combat team wanted it further away, like the Assassin's Creed and Batman: Arkham games; he eventually convinced the team to go with a close camera.

Explaining Kratos's axe, lead gameplay designer Jason McDonald, who had worked on the series since the original game, said the axe was chosen because they wanted a more grounded direction. Initially, they were unsure how to make it unique. After they came up with the concept of throwing the axe and having it return to Kratos, "things started to fall into place". McDonald said that combat with the axe was a little slower than with the Blades of Chaos, "but it's just as fluid and just as brutal as it's ever been". Barlog took inspiration from Dark Souls (2011), which influenced the combat system, particularly its gameplay loop and strategic decision-making, as well as the approach to storytelling. In addition, designers Anthony DiMento and Luis Sanchez revealed how God of War's level design and exploration were influenced by Bloodborne (2015). They wanted to "just have the world breathe a little bit" and expand upon player discovery by including "micro-loops where you're unlocking paths, unlocking shortcuts" that gave purpose. DiMento said that a team dedicated to the exploration was formed. One challenge was creating quests in a world that did not have non-playable characters outside of the core narrative. DiMento said, "I set out to create a quest giver that was light-weight, but also flexible enough to be used in multiple locations, while providing a varied suite of quest activities". This resulted in the "wayward spirits" (ghosts with ties to the world) found throughout the game. Having the spirits tell their stories "made [the world] feel more alive". The developers ended up with a four-tiered system for side quests: the top-tier quests were from the characters Brok and Sindri, the next level from wayward spirits, then treasure maps and artifacts, and the bottom tier were milestones, such as killing all of Odin's ravens. Brok and Sindri's quests were made into dungeons while the others were used for exploration. The developers also had to find the reasons that would motivate Kratos to undertake these quests. For Brok and Sindri, it was to obtain more powerful gear, but for the wayward spirits, it was because of Atreus's naiveté and kind-hearted nature, as well as opportunities for Kratos to teach him life lessons.

Unlike the previous games, Santa Monica did not make a demo for public release. Barlog said that doing so would have delayed development by a couple of months. He also confirmed God of War was built for the standard PlayStation 4 but would "benefit from the power" of the PlayStation 4 Pro, which was released a few months after God of War was announced. Players with a Pro have the option to favor resolution or performance. Favoring resolution runs the game in 4K with checkerboard rendering at a target frame rate of 30 frames per second (fps), while the performance option runs the game at 1080p and targets 60fps. In late December 2016, Barlog confirmed God of War was playable from start to finish, and later said its story would take 25–35 hours to complete (significantly more than the previous four main installments, which each took an average of 10 hours to complete).

A new trailer was shown at E3 2017, featuring new gameplay, cinematics, and characters. In it, Kratos is shown using a shield offensively and defensively. At one point, Kratos finds a Greek vase with himself on it, wielding his infamous double-chained blades. During the trailer, an unnamed woman warns Kratos about the Norse gods, as they knew what he did to the Greek gods, while a pair of wolves are also shown. The trailer ends with Kratos and Atreus encountering the World Serpent. Atreus is able to translate its request to help the pair. It was confirmed that the game would be released in early 2018. Before the launch, Santa Monica included a section on the God of War website titled "The Lost Pages", detailing some of the lore of the Nordic world. In January 2018, the release date was confirmed for April 20, 2018. A trailer was also released that showed that the mythological character Mímir would have a role. God of War went gold on March 22.

=== Characterization ===
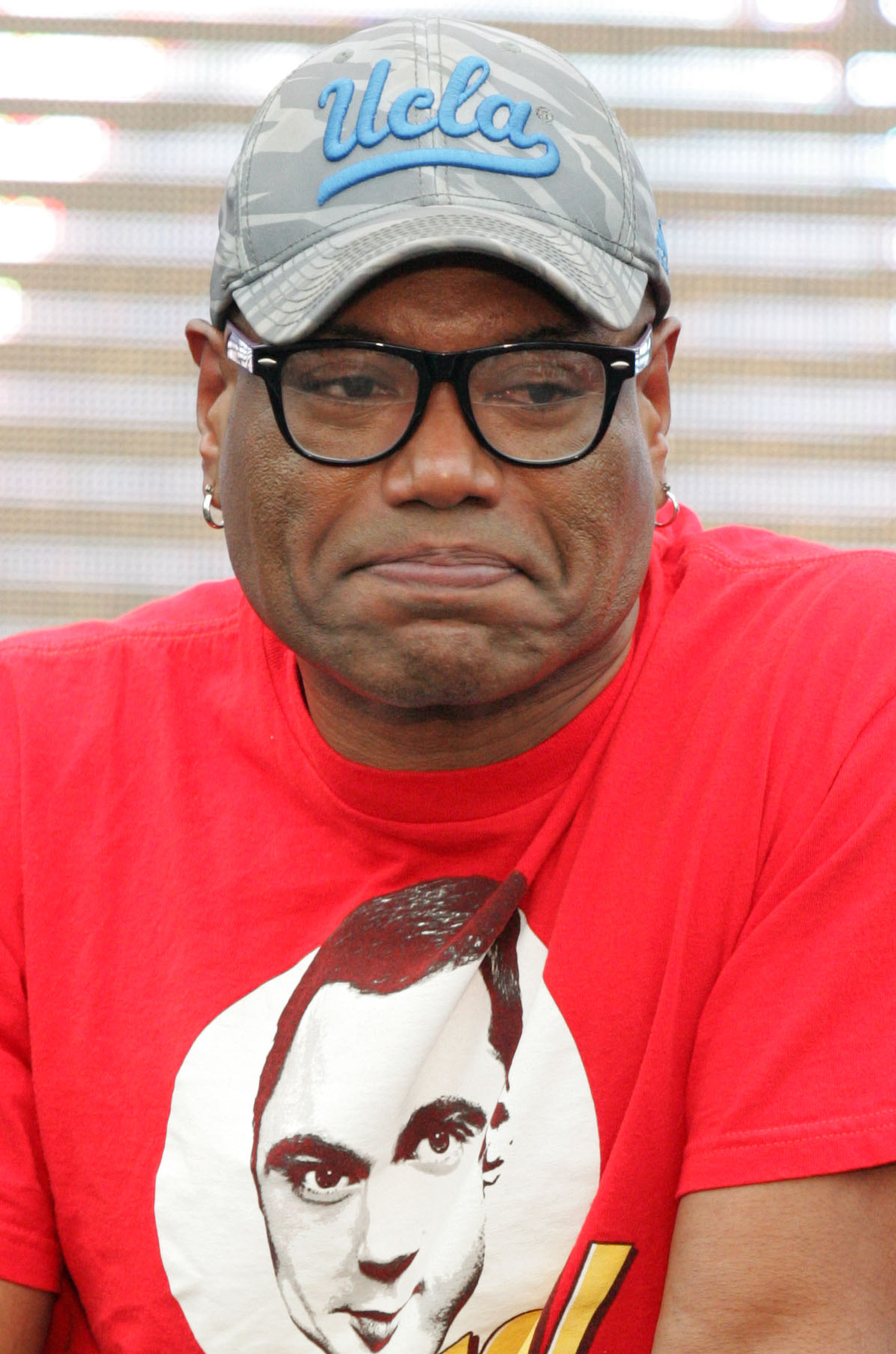
Christopher Judge does the voice and cinematic motion capture for Kratos, replacing T.C. Carson, who had voiced Kratos since the original 2005 game and also provided the motion capture in 2013's Ascension.

During early development, there was talk of having a different protagonist. Some of the team said that Kratos was "annoying" and felt Kratos's story had run its course. Barlog said it took a lot of convincing to keep Kratos. Referencing the Nintendo character Mario and the Mario games, Barlog said that like Mario, "Kratos is intrinsically tied" to the God of War series. In regard to the new changes, Barlog said that:

I knew I didn't want to simply reboot the franchise, starting over with a retelling of the origin story. I wanted to reimagine the gameplay, give players a fresh perspective and a new tactile experience while delving deeper into the emotional journey of Kratos to explore the compelling drama that unfolds when an immortal demigod makes a decision to change.

Barlog explained that Kratos had to change his cycle of violence and learn to control his rage. He said Kratos had made many bad decisions, which led to the destruction of Olympus. He wanted to know what would happen if Kratos made a good decision. The birth of Barlog's own son influenced the idea of Kratos's character change. The canceled live-action Star Wars television series developed by George Lucas during the 2000s was also an influence; back on his days working at LucasArts, Barlog had been allowed to visit Skywalker Ranch and read some scripts written by writers of The Shield and 24 planned for the show, particularly starring Emperor Palpatine in an emotional and sympathetic origin story that depicted his fall into villainy after being wronged by a heartless woman. The bond between Kratos and his son is at the heart of the game. Barlog said, "This game is about Kratos teaching his son how to be a god, and his son teaching Kratos how to be human again". Referencing the Marvel Comics character Hulk, Barlog said that in regards to Kratos, "We've already told the story of The Hulk. We want to tell the story of [Bruce] Banner now". One of their goals was to make Kratos "a more nuanced and interesting character". In changing the narrative focus, Studstill said, "I think we inherently knew the franchise needed to evolve in that emotional beat and be something meatier for the older generation of gamers."

Christopher Judge, best known as Teal'c from Stargate SG-1, replaced Terrence C. Carson as the voice of Kratos; Carson had voiced Kratos since the original God of War game. Carson said "Sony went in a new direction". Carson later said that he understood the reason and that Judge's casting made sense for what Sony was wanting to do. He also said that losing acting jobs is part of the business, but he did feel a lack of respect as he was not contacted by anyone at Sony.

In explaining the actor change, Barlog said that the way the previous games were made, they were able to have someone else do the motion capture instead of the voice actor. Although Carson had done the motion capture for Kratos in Ascension, Barlog said the actor change was made because of the type of camera work they wanted to do. For the new camera work, they needed someone who was closer to Kratos's size to do the motion capture along with a child. Carson was unsuitable for this because he was much shorter than Kratos, who is over 6 feet (180 cm) tall: "Offsetting [Carson's height] for the size of a child, it turned out it was going to be almost impossible to try and actually shoot them and go in and redo the animations". Judge was chosen because he was 6 feet 3 inches (191 cm) and had the build of a professional football player. He was also chosen because of the chemistry with his then-10-year-old co-star Sunny Suljic, whose opinion was also sought in making the decision; out of all the auditions, he liked Judge the most. The two bonded well, and Judge described his time with Suljic as time he had missed with his own children. In stepping into the role of Kratos, Judge took it as an opportunity to add something new to the character. He researched the character and Carson's performance but decided not to imitate it. Since Santa Monica was going in a new direction, he decided to start fresh. Judge was thrown off when he first read the script, saying it "was a real script," and not just "a way to get into battles," which is why he decided to take the role. He said, "it was really this great story of this relationship and this crazy mythology". While Judge did all of Kratos's motion capture for the cinematic scenes, stuntman Eric Jacobus did Kratos's combat motion capture; Jacobus was found by God of War's animators on YouTube. Instead of going directly to Santa Monica to audition, he recorded and submitted an audition tape and was hired immediately. Former WWE wrestler Shad Gaspard also performed some of the motion capture for Kratos.

During E3 2016, GameSpot mistakenly reported that Kratos's son's name was Charlie, which Barlog laughingly denied. In reference to this, the giant turtle above Freya's house was named Chaurli. In January 2017, after a fan downloaded the God of War overture and saw the track's details that read, "An introduction to Kratos and Atreus", Barlog confirmed on Twitter that Atreus was in fact the son's name. Barlog said Atreus was unaware that Kratos was a demigod and did not know about his past. They did not reveal details of Atreus's mother before the release because she was a critical part of the story. Barlog said that during gameplay, Atreus would be "like magic, an additional combat resource, and [the player is] training him and teaching him". The developers said Atreus would not be a burden during gameplay. The team experimented with several different approaches for Atreus to ensure he was an empowering presence. Barlog said he did not want the game to be an escort mission wherein the artificial intelligence causes a problem for the player. Their goal was for Atreus to enhance Kratos's capabilities without becoming a liability. This resulted in the developers having Atreus act freely unless the player uses a button to issue specific commands to him. Atreus was also designed to call out enemy locations during combat. Since the camera is closer to Kratos, some enemies might be difficult for the player to see. Lead gameplay designer Jason McDonald said that it took a lot of iterations with the enemies and Atreus to make it all work together.

Early in development, it was suggested that Atreus be cut, or his role significantly reduced because of the many developmental challenges and their costs. Barlog said the game could have worked without Atreus, but it would have been completely different, likening it to the 2013 film All Is Lost. Barlog said that with just Kratos, it would have been "one character who talks to himself occasionally, but generally, it will be very silent and everyone will talk in old Norse, so that you won't understand anything anybody's saying". After hearing Barlog's case, Sony gave him the freedom to incorporate Atreus. Lead level designer Rob Davis also noted that Atreus allowed for "significant gameplay and storytelling opportunities that might not otherwise [have been] possible". After God of War was revealed at E3 2016, it drew comparisons to Naughty Dog's The Last of Us (2013), a game that also featured a father-child type story and gameplay. Barlog felt it was "fantastic" to be compared to that game and found it odd that some people considered the similarities a negative thing. He said: "I think we're all inspired by each other." He used The Last of Us to demonstrate to the development team how an in-game companion could work without escort missions.

=== Soundtrack ===
God of War (PlayStation Soundtrack)

Soundtrack album by Bear McCreary
- Released: April 20, 2018
- Genre: Contemporary classical music
- Length: 1:19:00
- Label: Sony Classical Records

God of War (PlayStation Soundtrack) was released on April 20, 2018, by Sony Classical Records. It was composed by Bear McCreary, who is best known for his work on television shows like Battlestar Galactica and The Walking Dead. McCreary was called into Santa Monica Studio in November 2014 to meet with music producers Peter Scaturro and Keith Leary to discuss "a secret project"; McCreary had previously collaborated with Scaturro and Leary on 2011's SOCOM 4: U.S. Navy SEALs. Ideas of folk music, mythology, Nordic ethnic instruments, vocal writing, and classical thematic development were discussed; McCreary correctly guessed that the discussions were about a new God of War. McCreary met with Barlog early on to discuss his narrative vision. After meeting with him, McCreary felt the franchise was in good hands because God of War II, which Barlog also directed, was his favorite installment.

During the initial discussions, McCreary realized he needed to compose new music and not reuse music from the series. He said that although he loved those games, he "would not describe them as emotionally dynamic". Based on his memory of the earlier games' music, however, he was inspired by their sounds, such as "deep choirs, pounding drums, and shrieking brass", and reinvented them for the Nordic setting. To ensure the music represented the setting, McCreary spent months researching and listening to Viking folk music, which resulted in him using "exotic instrumentation and languages from various Northern European folk traditions". He also wanted the score to be huge and varied, "full of peaks and valleys, tiny incantations and gigantic set pieces". The main Kratos theme in particular features low orchestral instruments, an Icelandic choir, deep male vocals, powerful female vocals (in particular Faroese singer Eivør Pálsdóttir), folk percussion, and Nordic stringed instruments, like the nyckelharpa and hurdy gurdy. The track "Witch of the Woods" uses a renaissance and baroque instrument called a viola da gamba, which is an ancestor of the modern cello. The Stranger's theme, found in the track "Deliverance", uses a Hardanger fiddle.

The first theme composed was "Memories of Mother". McCreary said the theme itself was not originally for Atreus's mother Faye, but for Kratos himself. His initial drafts were different variations of this melancholy tune. After God of War had gone into full production, McCreary and the development team realized it was "too sad and lyrical to represent Kratos". McCreary stepped away from this theme and focused on writing a new one, or what he called the Kratos Theme, which he felt was more representative of the character: "masculine, relentless, and badass". He spent several months working with Barlog, Scaturro, Leary, Sony music director Chuck Doud, and the rest of the development team to make this new theme. McCreary described it as "arguably one of my most structurally satisfying and catchy melodies". After further scoring, McCreary realized that Faye would require a theme, and his original one was "exactly [what] I needed". This melody was woven throughout several scenes and is featured as prominently as Kratos's theme. The three-note Kratos theme is most obviously heard in the title track, "God of War".

When it was decided that God of War would be revealed at E3 2016, Sony wanted McCreary to perform his original score with a live orchestra at the press conference. McCreary opened the show with the new main theme before the unveiling of God of War and performed the gameplay demo's music live during the presentation. On January 13, 2017, a live recording from E3 2016 of God of War's overture was released for a limited time free of charge. Barlog released the overture as a thank you to fans for God of War's E3 2016 trailer reaching fifteen million views on YouTube.

== Release ==
God of War was released worldwide on April 20, 2018, for the PlayStation 4. In addition to the standard base game, there were three special editions: the Stone Mason Edition, the Collector's Edition, and the Digital Deluxe Edition. The Stone Mason Edition was only available in the United States and Canada and came with several physical items, including: the base game in a SteelBook case, a 9-inch (230 mm) statue of Kratos and Atreus created by Gentle Giant, 2-inch (51 mm) carvings of the Huldra Brothers, a horse, and a troll, an exclusive lithograph, a cloth map, a stonemason's ring, and a keychain of Mímir's head that talks. There was a variety of downloadable content (DLC), including an exclusive shield skin, as well as an armor set and another shield skin for Kratos, a PlayStation 4 dynamic theme, a digital artbook, and God of War #0 by Dark Horse Comics. The Collector's Edition came with many of the same items, minus the ring, the keychain, the carvings of the horse and troll, and the exclusive shield skin. The Digital Deluxe Edition came with all the digital content, minus the exclusive shield skin. U.S. and Canadian customers also received a Kratos and Atreus pin for pre-ordering the Digital Deluxe Edition. Pre-orders at select retailers received three skins for Kratos's shield. Pre-orders from GameStop or EB Games also received the "Luck of Ages XP Talisman", granting increased XP and Hacksilver gains and increased ability to trigger perks.

In addition to the special editions, a Limited Edition PlayStation 4 Pro bundle was available the same day as the game. The bundle included the standard base game, a PlayStation 4 Pro console decorated with the runes on Kratos's axe, and a similarly themed DualShock 4 controller with the God of War logo. Additionally, an official tabletop card game titled God of War: The Card Game was released by CMON Limited on October 25, 2019. Created by Alexandru Olteanu and Fel Barros, players take on the role of the Norns, the Fates of Norse mythology, as they try to prevent Ragnarök with different combinations of characters and events from the game, providing many variations to completing the card game.

Prior to launch, Barlog confirmed that God of War would not have microtransactions, a feature that had become prominent with other games and criticized. He also confirmed that it would not have post-release DLC, like an expansion pack. He said he had pitched an idea for DLC, "but it was too ambitious". His idea was similar in scope to that of The Last of Us: Left Behind (2014) and Uncharted: The Lost Legacy (2017), large standalone expansions for The Last of Us (2013) and Uncharted 4: A Thief's End (2016), respectively. He said it would have been too big to be DLC, warranting its own standalone release.

Post-launch, Santa Monica supported God of War with patch updates to address software bugs. As well, the developers added new features along with these free updates. A Photo Mode was released as part of update patch 1.20 on May 9, 2018. It allows players to take customized in-game screenshots. Players can adjust the field of view, depth of view, filters, borders, the visibility of characters, and the ability to change the facial expressions of Kratos and Atreus. A New Game Plus mode was released as part of update patch 1.30 on August 20, 2018. To access the mode, players must have completed the game at any difficulty level. The mode itself can be played at any difficulty, but enemies are at a higher level with new maneuvers. All obtained items carry over to New Game Plus, and there are new resources to further upgrade gear, which also have new rarity levels. The option to skip cutscenes was also added. In November 2020, the PlayStation 5 (PS5) launched and is backwards compatible with PlayStation 4 games; these games see a performance boost when playing on the PS5. To further enhance the playing experience of God of War on the PS5, Santa Monica released an update on February 2, 2021, allowing it to be played at 60 fps with checkerboard-rendered 4K resolution.

As part of Sony's larger efforts to port their first-party exclusive games to Windows, Santa Monica Studio announced in October 2021 that God of War would be released for Windows on January 14, 2022. The port, handled by Jetpack Interactive with supervision by Santa Monica, includes additional graphic options support for Windows, including Nvidia's Deep Learning Super Sampling (DLSS) technology and ultra-widescreen support. This in turn marks the first main entry in the series to release on a non-PlayStation platform. According to Santa Monica's Matt DeWald, they had considered what options they could use to port their games to Windows, particularly as they used a non-standard game engine, and worked closely with Jetpack to determine the scope and technical issues associated with the port.

=== God of War: A Call from the Wilds ===
God of War: A Call from the Wilds was a text-based game that was only playable through Facebook Messenger. (Note: The game is no longer available.) To help further promote God of War, Sony partnered with Facebook to develop the play-by-web game, which released on February 1, 2018. Completing the game unlocked downloadable concept art. The short story followed Atreus on his first adventure in the Norse wilds. After archery training and learning runes with his mother, Atreus ventures into the wilderness after telepathically hearing the voice of a dying deer; he finds it covered in blood and stays with it during its final moments. A couple of draugr appear and Atreus attempts to fight them but is injured. He is saved by his father, Kratos, who was out hunting. The two then battle a revenant before returning home.

=== God of War: Mímir's Vision ===
God of War: Mímir's Vision is a smartphone companion app that was released on April 17, 2018, for Apple and Android devices. Using alternate reality, it provides a background for the Norse setting of God of War.

=== Raising Kratos ===
Raising Kratos is a YouTube documentary of Santa Monica Studio's five-year development process, showing the "herculean effort" that went into reviving the franchise. The documentary was announced on April 20, 2019, the one year anniversary of the launch, and was released the following month on May 10.

=== Tie-in books ===
==== The Art of God of War ====
The Art of God of War
- Author: Evan Shamoon
- Language: English
- Series: God of War
- Publisher: Dark Horse Comics
- Publication date: April 24, 2018
- Publication place: United States
- Media type: Hardcover, E-book
- ISBN: 978-1506705743

The Art of God of War is a book collecting artwork created for God of War during its development. It was written by Evan Shamoon and published by Dark Horse Comics on April 24, 2018.

==== God of War – The Official Novelization ====
God of War – The Official Novelization
- Author: James M. Barlog
- Language: English
- Series: God of War
- Genre: Action, Adventure
- Publisher: Titan Books
- Publication date: August 28, 2018
- Publication place: United States
- Media type: Paperback, Audiobook
- ISBN: 978-1-78909-014-7

An official novelization, written by Cory Barlog's father, James M. Barlog, was released on August 28, 2018, by Titan Books. An audiobook version is also available, narrated by Alastair Duncan, who voiced Mímir in the game.

Unlike the previous two God of War novels, it closely follows the source material with a few notable exceptions. The game never revealed how or why Kratos was in ancient Norway, or how much time had passed since the ending of God of War III, but the novel gives some indication. Kratos chose to leave ancient Greece to hide his identity and change who he was. At some point after leaving Greece, he battles some wolves and is saved by a cloaked female figure, presumably Faye. Later, during their journey, Kratos, Atreus, and Mímir see a mural with the wolves Sköll and Hati. This causes Kratos to have a flashback to the initial battle and makes him wonder if they dragged him to this new land and if so, why. There was also some retconning; at the end of God of War III, Kratos had the Blades of Exile, but this novel says he had the Blades of Chaos after killing Zeus. It is also mentioned that he tried several times to get rid of the blades, but by fate they kept returning to him. (For example, he threw them off a cliff, but they washed up on shore near him.) Sometime after ending up in Norway, he decided to hide them under his house and never use them again. This moment was said to have occurred 50 years before the start of the current story. When Kratos does recover the Blades of Chaos, he hears Pandora's speech about hope from God of War III.

In the game, Kratos sees one last image on the mural in Jötunheim. It seemingly shows Atreus holding Kratos's dead body, but in the novel, this mural is partially broken and does not show the corpse that Atreus is holding. Brok and Sindri also reveal why they made the Leviathan Axe for Faye; she had come to them as the last Guardian of Jötnar and needed a weapon to protect her people. The Huldra Brothers crafted the Leviathan Axe for her to be Mjölnir's equal. Mímir also mentioned that Faye, or rather Laufey the Just, thwarted many of the Æsir's plans, including freeing slaves, and Thor could never find her. Kratos's Guardian Shield is never mentioned, and Modi does not ambush the three, resulting in Atreus falling ill; Atreus instead falls ill shortly after their first encounter when Kratos kills Magni.

==== God of War (comic book series) ====
A four-issue comic series titled God of War was published monthly from November 2018 to February 2019 by Dark Horse Comics. Written by Chris Roberson with art by Tony Parker, the miniseries takes place shortly before the events of the game. Issue #0 was included digitally in the collector's editions. A second four-issue series from Dark Horse titled God of War: Fallen God was published monthly from March to June 2021—it was originally to begin publication in June 2020 but was delayed due to the COVID-19 pandemic. Taking place before the first series, Fallen God covers the timespan from God of War III to the beginning of the first comic series. Both series were collected as trade paperbacks in May 2019 (Volume 1) and December 2021 (Volume 2), respectively.

==== God of War: B Is for Boy ====
God of War: B Is for Boy
- Author: Andrea Robinson
- Illustrator: Romina Tempest
- Language: English
- Series: God of War
- Publisher: Insight Editions
- Publication date: September 1, 2020
- Publication place: United States
- Media type: Hardcover
- ISBN: 978-1-68383-889-0

God of War: B Is for Boy is an "ABC storybook for adults" which retells the story in an abridged format with illustrations. The title comes from Kratos referring to Atreus as "boy". It was written by Andrea Robinson, with the illustrations being provided by Romina Tempest. It released on September 1, 2020, by Insight Editions.

==== God of War: Lore and Legends ====
God of War: Lore and Legends
- Author: Rick Barba
- Language: English
- Series: God of War
- Publisher: Dark Horse Comics
- Publication date: September 9, 2020
- Publication place: United States
- Media type: Hardcover, E-book
- ISBN: 978-1506715520

God of War: Lore and Legends is a book that recreates Atreus's journal. It features expanded lore written in collaboration with the game's writing team. It was written by Rick Barba and published by Dark Horse Comics on September 9, 2020.

== Reception ==
Reception

Aggregate scores
Aggregator	Score
Metacritic	94/100 (PS4); 93/100 (PC)
OpenCritic	98% recommend

Review scores
Publication	Score
Destructoid	10/10
Electronic Gaming Monthly	9.5/10
Game Informer	9.75/10
GameRevolution	5/5
GameSpot	9/10
GamesRadar+	5/5
Giant Bomb	5/5
IGN	10/10
Polygon	10/10
USgamer	5/5
The Guardian	5/5
The Telegraph	5/5

=== Reviews ===
God of War received "universal acclaim" from critics, according to review aggregator website Metacritic, tying it with the original God of War for the highest score in the franchise. It has the fourth-highest score of all-time for a PlayStation 4 game, and the highest score for an original, non-remastered PlayStation 4 exclusive. It was the highest rated PlayStation 4 game of 2018 until the release of Red Dead Redemption 2 in October, which pushed God of War to second. It is also tied with the Xbox One version of Celeste for the second-highest score of 2018 regardless of platform. God of War received particular praise for its art direction, graphics, combat system, music, story, use of Norse mythology, characters, and cinematic feeling. Many reviewers felt it had successfully revitalized the series without losing the core identity of its predecessors.

The story was well praised. Nick Plessas of Electronic Gaming Monthly (EGM) said the story's most memorable moments were the interactions between Kratos and Atreus. He also noted, "there is often some comic relief to be found when Kratos's curtness and Atreus's charming naivety collide." He felt the presence of Atreus showed a side to Kratos not seen before, and that Kratos had evolved emotionally: "The rage and pain of his past is in constant conflict with his desire to spare his son from it, which comes across in even the most subtle actions and words, demonstrating the effort he is putting in." Plessas said Atreus's character was similarly complex. He commented it is easy for child characters "to succumb to a number of annoying child archetypes," but Atreus is more like a young man who is doing his best in an adult world. Game Informer's Joe Juba similarly praised the story, particularly the relationship between Kratos and Atreus: "The interactions of Kratos and Atreus range from adversarial to compassionate, and these exchanges have ample room to breathe and draw players in." Juba said that Kratos conveys more character than in any previous game. Peter Brown of GameSpot felt that although Kratos and Atreus were enjoyable, it was Mímir who stole the show. He also said that regardless of which character the player meets, the cast of God of War is "strong, convincing, and oddly enchanting." Writing for Game Revolution, Jason Faulkner praised Santa Monica for creating a sequel that new players would be able to understand without having played any of the previous games, while at the same time providing story references to those past games that returning fans would appreciate. Speaking of the relationship between Kratos and Atreus, Faulkner wrote that, "Watching the two grow throughout their journey is incredibly rewarding," equating it to that of Ellie and Joel from The Last of Us or Lee and Clementine from Telltale Games's The Walking Dead.

Plessas said that unlike previous games, which often relied on the player to use many combos in a sequential fashion, God of War is "more about individual moves strung together in response to the assortment of enemies being fought." Although that difference may be small, he said that the independent attacks of the axe "feature benefits and drawbacks players will need to understand and master to be as effective as possible." Furthermore, although the axe is "conceptually simple", it is "mechanically fascinating". It "succeeds as both a versatile means of dismembering foes and as a key element in puzzle solving." He felt the axe and all of its features was "distinctly rewarding to use" and that it had more versatility than all of the weapons in many other games. Juba said the Leviathan Axe is "a well-balanced and entertaining tool of destruction." He liked how it "emphasizes a more calculated style of combat; instead of zoomed-out, combo-driven encounters, Leviathan makes you a tactician." He also enjoyed how the combat system gradually unfolded; although seemingly restrictive at first, he noted players will be rapidly alternating between weapons and skills. While some reviewers greatly enjoyed the ability to call the Leviathan Axe back to Kratos's hand, Chris Carter of Destructoid felt it got old after a while. Atreus's implementation was praised; Plessas said Atreus is "surprisingly useful" and that he "lands in the perfect spot on the spectrum between independence and reliance." Faulkner noted that, "The interplay between Kratos ax, fists, and shield, and Atreus's bow makes for an impressive fighting system." Despite its different approach to combat, GamesRadar+'s Leon Hurley felt God of War was "every bit as brutally unflinching as previous games".

Writing for Polygon, Chris Plante praised the camerawork as a technical marvel, noting the seamless shift from cinematic back to the gameplay. Juba said the decision to shift the camera closer to Kratos "[proved] immensely rewarding during big moments by giving [the player] an intimate view." Faulkner, however, claimed "it can be difficult to control the camera and keep a bead on the enemies you're fighting." In his review for IGN, Jonathon Dornbush felt the intimacy of the camera makes all the emotions "more real and impactful." Faulkner said the visuals were amazing, "and with 4K and HDR this game goes a step beyond what even games like Horizon Zero Dawn showed us was possible on this platform." Brown noted that "God of War is a technical and artistic showcase. It is without a doubt one of the best-looking console games ever released." Dan Ryckert of Giant Bomb claimed that games like Uncharted: The Lost Legacy and Horizon Zero Dawn "made great cases for a PS4 Pro and a 4K television, but God of War's visuals are a bigger selling point than anything I've seen on Sony's platform to date."

Plessas felt that the boss fights "do not hit quite the same frequency as they did in the past few games". However, the few boss fights "do the series proud". As to the vast world of God of War, Faulkner said that, "The great thing about the exploration in God of War is that you can participate in it as little or as much as you want." He said an excellent design decision is that during main plot points, the game keeps the player on task, while in between, the player can explore, allowing God of War "to have the best of both worlds". Plessas noted that although the puzzles require thought, they were not "hair-pullingly" difficult as some were in previous games. Juba also found that the puzzles were not too challenging, saying they were fun.

Plessas felt that the RPG elements made God of War unique. He said players could "specialize Kratos to meet the specific task at hand, or develop a build that best suits a preferred playstyle". Although this did not make the game easier, he felt it did make it more manageable. Juba noted that although this type of upgrading "may be less exciting" compared to previous games where Kratos just learns new moves, it still "provides a powerful incentive to explore." Ryckert was disappointed by this type of customization. He felt the presentation was "half-baked" and that some materials were confusing as there was little explanation given for their use. He did, however, say it was "cool" to see new armor on Kratos.

In terms of flaws, Plessas said that "God of War is so good that its most egregious failing is not letting fans play more of it", as New Game Plus was not an option at the time of the review. Juba said that "God of War's momentum rarely falters, and when it does, the inconvenience is brief." One example he gave was the map, saying that although players have freedom to explore, it can be difficult to track Kratos's position. He also felt the fast-travel system was "weirdly cumbersome" and that it opens up too late. Although he enjoyed these features, Faulkner noted some players may dislike that God of War has a lack of player agency, and players have to explore the majority of the game on foot or by boat since the fast-travel feature is unlocked late. Brown felt that if anything in God of War was a letdown, it was the final fight against Baldur: "He's great from a narrative standpoint, unraveling in a manner that changes your perspective, but it's the fight itself that leaves you wanting. There are plenty of big boss battles and tests of skill throughout the course of the game, yet this fight doesn't reach the same heights, and feels like it was played a little safe." Hurley said his only criticism was that, "You can occasionally find yourself unsure if you're doing something wrong, or don't have the right equipment yet."

=== Sales ===
During its release week in the United Kingdom, God of War became the fastest-selling entry in the franchise, selling 35% more physical copies than God of War III. It remained at the top of the all format sales chart for six consecutive weeks through April and May, setting a record for a PlayStation 4 exclusive having the most consecutive weeks at number one. It sold 46,091 copies in its first week on sale in Japan, which placed it at number two on the sales chart. It sold over 3.1 million copies worldwide within three days of its release, making it the fastest-selling PlayStation 4 exclusive at the time. It was the fastest-selling game of the month of its release and contributed to the PlayStation 4 being the best-selling console of that month. In total, God of War sold over 5 million copies in its first month, with 2.1 million in digital sales. By May 2019, it had sold over 10 million units worldwide, making it the best-selling game in the series. By August 2021, total sales had exceeded over 19.5 million units, making it the best-selling PlayStation 4 game. By March 2022, the Windows version had sold 971,000 units, giving a total of over 20.4 million units sold. By November 2022, God of War had sold 23 million copies.

=== Accolades ===
God of War won Game of the Year awards from several gaming publications, including British Academy Games Awards, The Blade, CNET, Destructoid, D.I.C.E. Awards, Empire, Entertainment Weekly, G1, The Game Awards, Game Developers Choice Awards, Game Informer, Game Revolution, GamesRadar+, IGN, Nerdist, New York Game Awards, Polygon, Push Square, Slant Magazine, Time, Variety, and VideoGamer.com. God of War was named among the best games of the 2010s by Areajugones, BuzzFeed, GameSpew, GamesRadar+, Gaming Age, GamingBolt, The Hollywood Reporter, IGN, Metacritic, Slant Magazine, Stuff, and VG247. In 2021, it was voted as the winner of IGN's Best Video Game of All Time. In 2025, Rolling Stone named God of War the 39th-greatest video game.

God of War was nominated for Game of the Show, Best PlayStation 4 Game, and Best Action Game at IGN's Best of E3 2016 Awards. It won the award for Game of the Year, Best PlayStation 4 Game, Best Action-Adventure Game, Best Art Direction, and Best Story at IGN's Best of 2018 Awards. It was a runner-up for Best Graphics, and was nominated for Best Music.

Year	Award	Category	Result	Ref.
2016	Game Critics Awards 2016	Special Commendation for Graphics	Won	
2016	Golden Joystick Awards	Most Wanted Game	Nominated	
2016	The Game Awards 2016	Most Anticipated Game	Nominated	
2017	Golden Joystick Awards	Most Wanted Game	Nominated	
2017	The Game Awards 2017	Most Anticipated Game	Nominated	
2018	The Independent Game Developers' Association Awards	Best Action and Adventure Game	Won	
2018	The Independent Game Developers' Association Awards	Best Audio Design	Nominated	
2018	9th Hollywood Music in Media Awards	Original Score - Video Game	Nominated	
2018	2018 Golden Joystick Awards	Best Storytelling	Won	
2018	2018 Golden Joystick Awards	Best Video Design	Won	
2018	2018 Golden Joystick Awards	Best Audio Design	Won	
2018	2018 Golden Joystick Awards	PlayStation Game of the Year	Won	
2018	2018 Golden Joystick Awards	Ultimate Game of the Year	Nominated	
2018	The Game Awards 2018	Game of the Year	Won	
2018	The Game Awards 2018	Best Game Direction	Won	
2018	The Game Awards 2018	Best Narrative	Nominated	
2018	The Game Awards 2018	Best Art Direction	Nominated	
2018	The Game Awards 2018	Best Score/Music	Nominated	
2018	The Game Awards 2018	Best Audio Design	Nominated	
2018	The Game Awards 2018	Best Performance (Christopher Judge)	Nominated	
2018	The Game Awards 2018	Best Action/Adventure Game	Won	
2018	Gamers' Choice Awards	Fan Favorite Game	Nominated	
2018	Gamers' Choice Awards	Fan Favorite Action Game	Nominated	
2018	Gamers' Choice Awards	Fan Favorite Single Player Gaming Experience	Nominated	
2018	Gamers' Choice Awards	Fan Favorite Character of the Year	Nominated	
2018	Gamers' Choice Awards	Fan Favorite Male Voice Actor (Christopher Judge)	Won	
2018	Gamers' Choice Awards	Fan Favorite Male Voice Actor (Jeremy Davies)	Nominated	
2018	Gamers' Choice Awards	Fan Favorite Female Voice Actor (Danielle Bisutti)	Nominated	
2019	46th Annie Awards	Character Animation in a Video Game	Nominated	
2019	17th Visual Effects Society Awards	Outstanding Visual Effects in a Real-Time Project	Nominated	
2019	22nd Annual D.I.C.E. Awards	Game of the Year	Won	
2019	22nd Annual D.I.C.E. Awards	Adventure Game of the Year	Won	
2019	22nd Annual D.I.C.E. Awards	Outstanding Achievement in Game Direction	Won	
2019	22nd Annual D.I.C.E. Awards	Outstanding Achievement in Game Design	Won	
2019	22nd Annual D.I.C.E. Awards	Outstanding Achievement in Animation	Nominated	
2019	22nd Annual D.I.C.E. Awards	Outstanding Achievement in Art Direction	Won	
2019	22nd Annual D.I.C.E. Awards	Outstanding Achievement in Character (Atreus)	Nominated	
2019	22nd Annual D.I.C.E. Awards	Outstanding Achievement in Character (Kratos)	Won	
2019	22nd Annual D.I.C.E. Awards	Outstanding Achievement in Original Music Composition	Won	
2019	22nd Annual D.I.C.E. Awards	Outstanding Achievement in Sound Design	Won	
2019	22nd Annual D.I.C.E. Awards	Outstanding Achievement in Story	Won	
2019	22nd Annual D.I.C.E. Awards	Outstanding Technical Achievement	Nominated	
2019	Writers Guild of America Awards 2018	Outstanding Achievement in Videogame Writing	Won	
2019	SXSW Gaming Awards	Video Game of the Year	Won	
2019	SXSW Gaming Awards	Excellence in SFX	Nominated	
2019	SXSW Gaming Awards	Excellence in Animation	Nominated	
2019	SXSW Gaming Awards	Excellence in Gameplay	Nominated	
2019	SXSW Gaming Awards	Excellence in Technical Achievement	Nominated	
2019	SXSW Gaming Awards	Excellence in Narrative	Nominated	
2019	SXSW Gaming Awards	Excellence in Visual Achievement	Won	
2019	SXSW Gaming Awards	Excellence in Design	Won	
2019	19th Game Developers Choice Awards	Game of the Year	Won	
2019	19th Game Developers Choice Awards	Best Audio	Nominated	
2019	19th Game Developers Choice Awards	Best Design	Nominated	
2019	19th Game Developers Choice Awards	Best Narrative	Nominated	
2019	19th Game Developers Choice Awards	Best Technology	Nominated	
2019	19th Game Developers Choice Awards	Best Visual Art	Nominated	
2019	15th British Academy Games Awards	Best Game	Won	
2019	15th British Academy Games Awards	Artistic Achievement	Nominated	
2019	15th British Academy Games Awards	Audio Achievement	Won	
2019	15th British Academy Games Awards	Game Design	Nominated	
2019	15th British Academy Games Awards	Music	Won	
2019	15th British Academy Games Awards	Narrative	Won	
2019	15th British Academy Games Awards	Performer (Christopher Judge)	Nominated	
2019	15th British Academy Games Awards	Performer (Danielle Bisutti)	Nominated	
2019	15th British Academy Games Awards	Performer (Jeremy Davies)	Won	
2019	15th British Academy Games Awards	Performer (Sunny Suljic)	Nominated	
2019	2019 Webby Awards	Best Music/Sound Design	Won	
2019	ASCAP Composers' Choice Awards	2018 Video Game Score of the Year	Nominated	
2019	2019 Nebula Awards	Game Writing	Nominated	
2022	The Steam Awards	Game of the Year	Nominated	
2022	The Steam Awards	Outstanding Story-Rich Game	Won	

== Sequel ==
Following God of War's announcement in mid-2016, Barlog confirmed that it would not be Kratos's last game. He also said that after the Norse era, future games could see the series tackling Egyptian or Maya mythology, and although the 2018 installment focused on Norse mythology, it alluded to other mythologies co-existing in the world. Barlog also said he liked the idea of having different directors for each game, as had happened with the Greek era, and that although he might not direct another God of War, he would still be at Santa Monica to work on future games.

A sequel, God of War Ragnarök, was announced at the PlayStation 5 Showcase event in September 2020 and was originally scheduled to be released in 2021. However, it was delayed, in part, due to the COVID-19 pandemic, and released worldwide on November 9, 2022, for both the PlayStation 4 and PlayStation 5, marking the first cross-gen release in the series. Barlog stepped down as game director and became a producer and creative director, while Eric Williams, who had worked on every previous game in the series, assumed the role of game director. Taking place three years after the 2018 installment, Ragnarök concluded the Norse era of the series.

== Television series ==
In March 2022, it was reported that a live action television series was said to be in development at Amazon Prime Video by Mark Fergus, Hawk Ostby, and Rafe Judkins. During an investor briefing that May, Sony Interactive Entertainment president Jim Ryan confirmed that a God of War television series was in development for Prime Video. The series was officially ordered in December 2022 and is being produced by Sony Pictures Television and Amazon Studios in association with PlayStation Productions, and it will premiere on Prime Video in more than 240 countries and territories worldwide. Executive producers include Barlog, PlayStation Productions's Asad Qizilbash and Carter Swan, Santa Monica Studio's Yumi Yang, and Vertigo Entertainment's Roy Lee, with Santa Monica Studio's Jeff Ketcham serving as a co-executive producer. The series will adapt the Norse era, beginning with the events of the 2018 installment.

Amazon Studios's Head of Television, Vernon Sanders, assured that the series would stay true to the game. Implying that there could be multiple seasons, Sanders said that the "emotional core" of the first season, and series as a whole, would be the father-and-son story. Qizilbash stated that they would apply the same amount of care that they did with the television adaptation of The Last of Us, stating that they would be telling the whole story of the game, as without the time constraints of a film, they have multiple episodes to be able to tell the story.

The series was originally being written by Fergus and Ostby, with Judkins serving as showrunner, who were all also going to be executive producers. By January 2024, writing was underway. In October, however, it was reported that while multiple scripts for the first season had been completed and although both Sony and Prime gave praise, Fergus, Ostby, and Judkins left the project as the studios wanted to start over and go in a different direction. Prolific creator and showrunner Ronald D. Moore was then hired on as the series writer, showrunner, and as an executive producer. In March 2025, Moore revealed that Amazon had ordered two seasons of the series. Pre-production started that December in Vancouver with casting underway. Frederick E. O. Toye is set to direct the first two episodes of the series. Casting announcements began in January 2026, with Ryan Hurst, who portrayed Thor in God of War Ragnarök, as Kratos, Teresa Palmer as Sif, Max Parker as Heimdall, Ólafur Darri Ólafsson as Thor, Mandy Patinkin as Odin, Danny Woodburn as Brok, Jeff Gulka as Sindri, and Ed Skrein as Baldur, with Alastair Duncan reprising his role as Mímir and child actor Callum Vinson as Atreus. The series officially entered production on February 27, 2026.
