= Polyarc =

American video game developer

Polyarc, Inc.
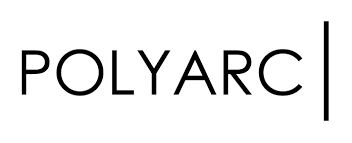
- Industry: Video games
- Founded: 2015
- Defunct: September 11, 2026
- Fate: Closure
- Headquarters: Seattle, WA, United States
- Key people: Tam Armstrong (CEO & Co-Founder); Chris Alderson (Co-Founder); Danny Bulla (Co-Founder)
- Number of employees: 6 (2016)
- Website: www.polyarcgames.com

Polyarc was an American video game developer based in Seattle, WA. The company was founded by Tam Armstrong, Chris Alderson, and Danny Bulla in 2015.

== History ==
Polyarc was founded by Tam Armstrong, Chris Alderson, and Danny Bulla, with Armstrong as its CEO, in 2015. The company was founded by former Bungie and Rockstar employees with the intention of developing games for VR. The company raised $3.5 million in 2016 to fund the development of its first game, Moss, from Hiro Capital. Ian Livingstone, a former head of Eidos and founding partner of Hiro Capital, joined the board of Polyarc. In 2020, Polyarc raised another $9 Million in funding to finance future developments. This includes the sequel to Moss, Moss: Book II, as well as Moss: The Forgotten Relic, which is a release of both Moss games for non-VR platforms. The company announced on September 11, 2026 that it was shutting down.

== Games developed ==
Year	Title	Platform(s)
2018	Moss	PlayStation VR, PC, Oculus Quest
2022	Moss: Book II	PlayStation VR, PC, Oculus Quest
2025	Glassbreakers: Champions of Moss	PC, Meta Quest, Apple Vision Pro
2026	Moss: The Forgotten Relic	PC, PlayStation 5, Xbox Series, Xbox One, Nintendo Switch, Nintendo Switch 2
