= Milla Ruud Reitan =

Swedish figure skater (born 2005)

- Milla Ruud Reitan and Nikolaj Majorov at the 2026 World Championships

Personal information
- Born: 27 September 2005 (age 21) Oslo, Norway
- Height: 1.66 m (5 ft 5 in)

Figure skating career
- Country: Sweden (since 2023); Germany (2021–22); Norway (until 2020)
- Discipline: Ice dance (since 2020); Women's singles (2018-20)
- Partner: Nikolaj Majorov
- Coach: Rostislav Sinicyn; Natalia Karamysheva
- Began skating: 2010

Medal record
Swedish Championships
Gold medal – first place	2024 Norrköping	Ice dance
Gold medal – first place	2025 Västerås	Ice dance
Gold medal – first place	2026 Landskrona	Ice dance

Milla Ruud Reitan (born 27 September 2005) is a Norwegian-Swedish figure skater who currently competes with Nikolaj Majorov for Sweden. With Majorov, she is a three-time Swedish national champion (2024–26), the 2025 CS Denis Ten Memorial bronze medalist, and competed at the European and World Championships. In addition, they are the first Swedish ice dance team to ever compete at the Winter Olympics (2026).

== Personal life ==
Ruud Reitan was born on 27 September 2005 in Oslo, Norway. She has an older brother, Mathias.

In 2025, she and her ice dance partner, Nikolaj Majorov, confirmed that they were in a relationship.

Ruud Reitan became a Swedish citizen in January 2026. In addition to competitive ice dancing, Ruud Reitan also works as a choreographer and coach for skaters in Norway.

== Career ==
=== Early years ===
Ruud Reitan began skating in singles at age five and competed for Norway at the advanced novice level. She switched disciplines to ice dance in 2020, moving to Oberstdorf and partnering with Nikita Remeshevskiy. Ruud Reitan/Remeshevskiy competed at one international competition, 2021 Open d'Andorra, and placed eleventh at the junior level. Their partnership dissolved following the 2021–22 figure skating season.

=== Ice dance with Nikolaj Majorov ===
==== 2023–2024 season: Debut of Ruud Reitan/Majorov ====
In spring 2023, Ruud Reitan teamed up with Swedish singles skater, Nikolaj Majorov, with plans to compete for Sweden. It was subsequently announced that the team would train in Oberstdorf, Germany under Rostislav Sinicyn and Natalia Karamysheva.

Ruud Reitan/Majorov debuted as a team at the 2023 Nebelhorn Trophy, where they placed thirteenth and earned a high enough technical score in the rhythm dance to compete at the European Championships. They next competed at the 2023 Budapest Trophy, finishing eighth, and earning the minimum technical scores to compete at both the European and World championships. They subsequently finished fourth at the 2023 CS Denis Ten Memorial Challenge.

In December, the team won their first national title at the 2024 Swedish Championships. The following month, they competed at the 2024 European Championships in Kaunas, Lithuania and placed twenty-seventh with a technical error. In March, they competed at the 2024 World Championships in Montreal, Quebec, Canada. They were the first Swedish ice dance team to compete at the World Championships since 1982. They placed twenty-eighth and did not advance to the free dance.

==== 2024–2025 season ====
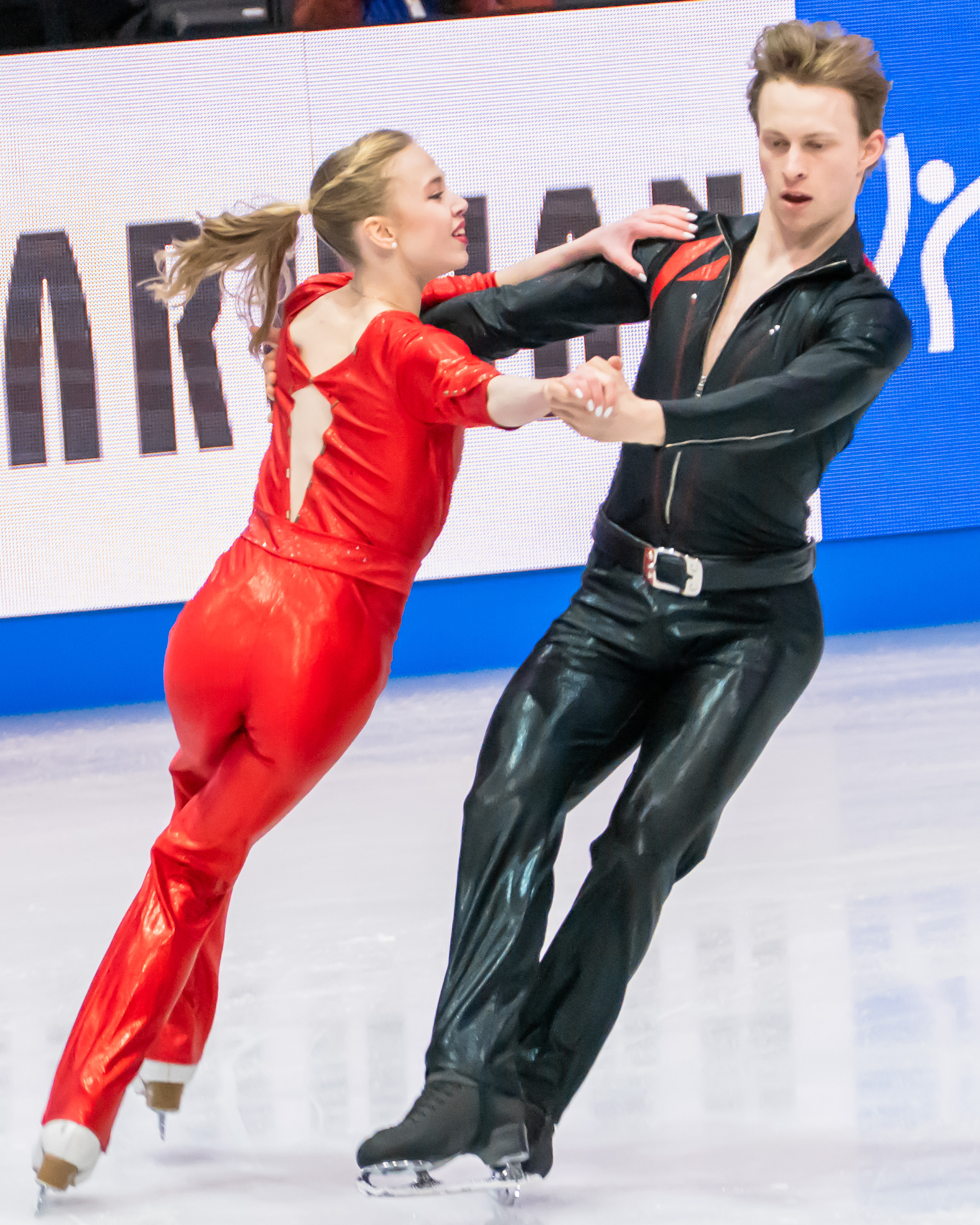
Reitan/Majorov performing their rhythm dance at the 2025 World Championships

Ruud Reitan/Majorov started the season by competing on the 2024–25 Challenger Series, placing ninth at the 2024 CS Denis Ten Memorial Challenge, sixth at the 2024 CS Nepela Memorial, and ninth at the 2024 CS Warsaw Cup.

In December, they won their second consecutive national title at the 2025 Swedish Championships. They followed up this result by winning silver at the 2025 Bavarian Open. Going on to compete at the 2025 European Championships in Tallinn, Estonia, Ruud Reitan/Majorov finished the event in seventeenth place. They then went on to win gold at the 2025 Maria Olszewska Memorial.

Ruud Reitan/Majorov finished the season by competing at the 2025 World Championships in Boston, Massachusetts, United States. They placed twenty-fifth in the rhythm dance and did not advance to the free dance segment.

==== 2025–26 season: Milano Cortina Olympics ====
Ruud Reitan/Majorov opened their season by competing at the final Olympic qualifying event, the 2025 Skate to Milano, finishing fifth overall. They were subsequently named as the first alternates for the 2026 Winter Olympic ice dance team.

They then went on to compete on the 2025–26 Challenger Series, winning bronze at the 2025 CS Denis Ten Memorial Challenge. One month later, they competed at the 2025 CS Warsaw Cup but withdrew following the rhythm dance.

In early December, it was announced that Skating Finland had given up their second ice dance berth for the 2026 Winter Olympics. As a result, the Olympic spot was given to Ruud Reitan/Majorov, making it the first time in history that a Swedish ice dance team had qualified for the Winter Olympics. Whether Ruud Reitan/Majorov could accept this berth was dependent on Ruud Reitan being able to obtain Swedish citizenship before the end of January. That same month, the team won their third consecutive national title at the 2026 Swedish Championships.

In early January, it was announced that Ruud Reitan had managed to obtain Swedish citizenship, making her and Majorov eligible to compete at the upcoming Olympics. That same month, Ruud Reitan/Majorov finished thirteenth at the 2026 European Championships in Sheffield, England, United Kingdom. In February they competed at the 2026 Winter Olympics, placing 19th in the rhythm dance and 20th in the free dance for a 20th place finish. They closed the season at the 2026 World Figure Skating Championships in Prague, finishing 29th.

== Programs ==
=== Ice dance with Nikolaj Majorov ===
Season	Rhythm dance	Free Dance
2025–2026	Livin' la Vida Loca by Ricky Martin, Draco Rosa, & Desmond Child; Te Extraño, Te Olvido, Te Amo by Ricky Martin & Carlos Lara; La Copa de la Vida by Ricky Martin, Luis Gómez-Escolar, Desmond Child, & Draco Rosa choreo. by Andrea Vaturi	Un Giorno Per Noi (Romeo and Juliet) by Nino Rota performed by Josh Groban choreo. by Andrea Vaturi
2024–2025	The Ballroom Blitz by The Sweet, Nicky Chinn, & Mike Chapman; Proud Mary by Tina Turner, John Fogerty, & Ike Turner choreo. by Maria Tumanovska-Chaika	Les Parapluies de Cherbourg by Michel Legrand performed by Nana Mouskouri & Mario Pelchat choreo. by Maria Tumanovska-Chaika
2023–2024	The Race (Club Mix); La Habanera; I Love You; The Race (Club Mix) by Yello choreo. by Maria Tumanovska-Chaika	The Spy and the Liar (from I Expect You to Die 2: The Spy and the Liar) by Schell Games, Jared Emerson-Johnson, & Mike Geier; I Expect You to Die (from I Expect You to Die) by Schell Games, Bonnie Bogovich, & The Yinzer Singers choreo. by Maria Tumanovska-Chaika

== Competitive highlights ==
- GP – Event of the ISU Grand Prix Series
- JGP – Event of the ISU Junior Grand Prix Series
- CS – Event of the ISU Challenger Series
- TBD – Assigned
- WD – Withdrew from competition
- C – Event was cancelled

=== Ice dance with Nikolaj Majorov ===
Competition placements at senior level
Season	2023–24	2024–25	2025–26	2026-27
Winter Olympics			20th	
World Championships	28th	25th	29th	
European Championships	27th	17th	13th	
Swedish Championships	1st	1st	1st	
GP Finland				TBD
GP France				7th
CS Denis Ten Memorial	4th	9th	3rd	
CS Nebelhorn Trophy	13th			
CS Nepela Memorial		6th		
CS Warsaw Cup		9th	WD	
CS Budapest Trophy	8th			
Maria Olszewska Memorial		1st		
Bavarian Open	5th	2nd	1st	
Skate to Milano			5th	

=== Ice dance with Nikita Remeshevskiy ===
Competition placements at junior level
Season	2021–22
Open d'Andorra	11th

== Detailed results ==
=== Ice dance with Nikolaj Majorov ===
ISU personal best scores in the +5/-5 GOE System
Segment	Type	Score	Event
Total	TSS	177.25	2025 CS Denis Ten Memorial Challenge
Rhythm dance	TSS	69.30	2025 Skate to Milano
Rhythm dance	TES	40.52	2025 Skate to Milano
Rhythm dance	PCS	29.73	2026 European Championships
Free dance	TSS	108.03	2025 CS Denis Ten Memorial Challenge
Free dance	TES	61.93	2025 CS Denis Ten Memorial Challenge
Free dance	PCS	46.44	2026 European Championships

Results in the 2023–24 season
Date	Event	RD		FD		Total	
Date	Event	P	Score	P	Score	P	Score
20–23 Sep 2023	(Germany) 2023 CS Nebelhorn Trophy	12	56.43	13	85.43	13	141.86
12–15 Oct 2023	(Hungary) 2023 CS Budapest Trophy	10	60.69	9	94.10	8	154.79
1–4 Nov 2023	(Kazakhstan) 2023 CS Denis Ten Memorial Challenge	5	62.94	4	97.82	4	160.76
14–17 Dec 2023	(Sweden) 2024 Swedish Championships	1	64.50	1	91.98	1	156.48
8–14 Jan 2024	(Lithuania) 2024 European Championships	27	54.89	—N/a	—N/a	27	54.89
30 Jan – 4 Feb 2024	(Germany) 2024 Bavarian Open	6	61.02	5	96.37	5	157.39
18–24 Mar 2024	(Canada) 2024 World Championships	28	61.13	—N/a	—N/a	28	61.13

Results in the 2024–25 season
Date	Event	RD		FD		Total	
Date	Event	P	Score	P	Score	P	Score
2–5 Oct 2024	(Kazakhstan) 2024 CS Denis Ten Memorial Challenge	11	58.88	8	101.90	9	160.78
24–26 Oct 2024	(Czech Republic) 2024 CS Nepela Memorial	6	66.87	6	105.69	6	172.56
20–24 Nov 2024	(Poland) 2024 CS Warsaw Cup	11	65.47	8	101.78	9	167.25
12–15 Dec 2024	(Sweden) 2025 Swedish Championships	1	66.66	1	101.16	1	167.82
20–26 Jan 2025	(Germany) 2025 Bavarian Open	63	67.41	2	105.43	2	172.84
28 Jan – 2 February 2025	(Estonia) 2025 European Championships	17	62.19	18	100.05	17	162.24
4–9 Mar 2025	(Poland) 2025 Maria Olszewska Memorial	2	64.67	1	108.48	1	173.15
24–30 Mar 2025	(United States) 2025 World Championships	25	64.98	—N/a	—N/a	25	64.98

Results in the 2025–26 season
Date	Event	RD		FD		Total	
Date	Event	P	Score	P	Score	P	Score
18–21 Sep 2025	(China) 2025 ISU Skate to Milano	4	69.30	6	99.30	5	168.60
1–4 Oct 2025	(Kazakhstan) 2025 CS Denis Ten Memorial Challenge	3	69.22	2	108.03	3	177.25
19–23 Nov 2025	(Poland) 2025 CS Warsaw Cup	22	55.81	–	–	–	WD
12–14 Dec 2025	(Sweden) 2026 Swedish Championships	1	73.09	1	111.48	1	184.57
13–18 Jan 2026	(United Kingdom) 2026 European Championships	12	68.89	12	106.75	13	175.74
Feb 9-11, 2026	(Italy) 2026 Winter Olympics	19	67.31	20	97.74	20	165.05
Mar 24–29, 2026	(Czech Republic) 2026 World Championships	29	58.20	—N/a	—N/a	29	58.20

Results in the 2026–27 season
Date	Event	SP		FS		Total	
Date	Event	P	Score	P	Score	P	Score
Oct 23–25, 2026	2026 Grand Prix de France	8	63.01	6	92.94	7	155.95
