= Nikolaj Majorov =

Swedish figure skater (born 2000)

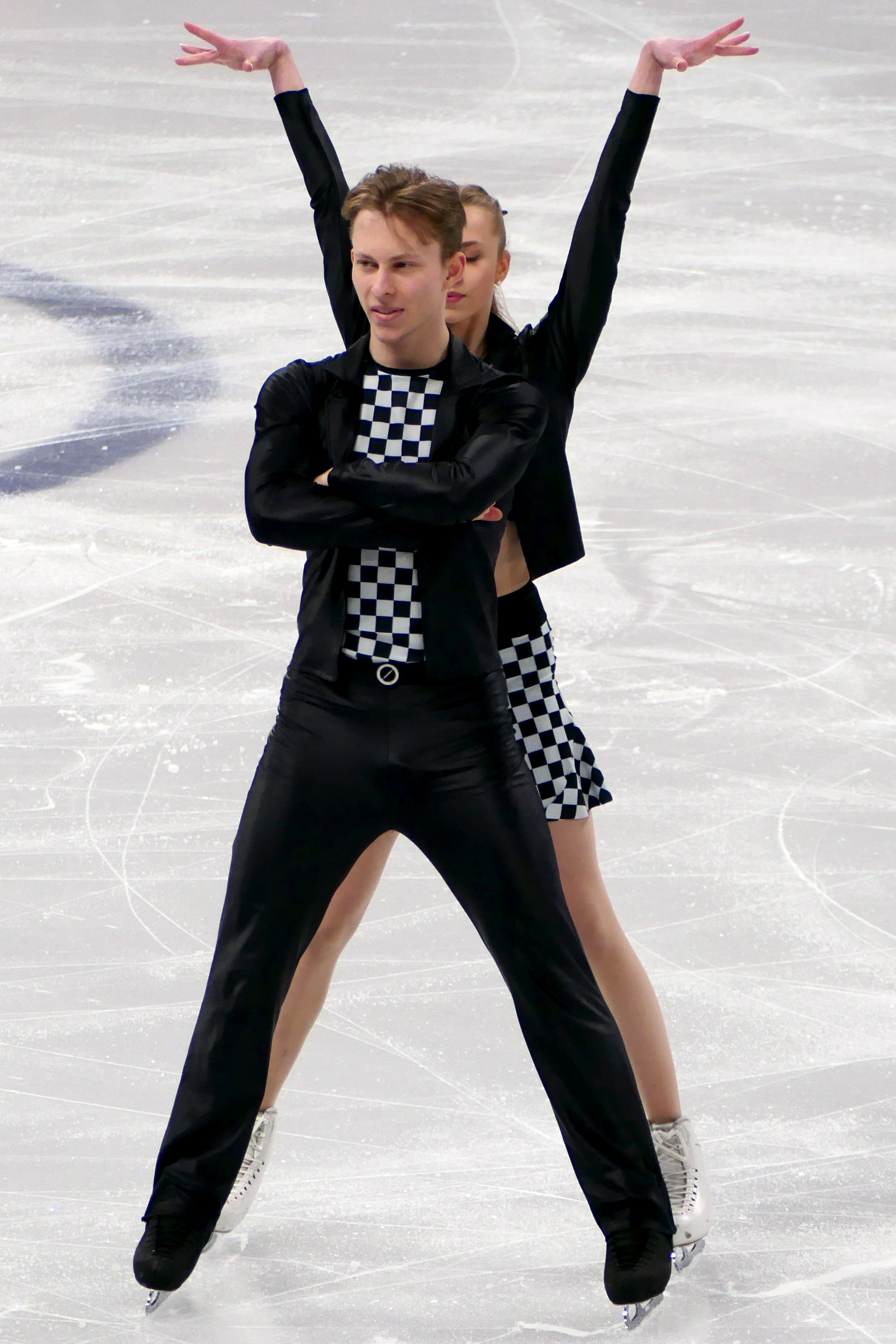
- Milla Ruud Reitan and Nikolaj Majorov at the 2024 World Championships

Personal information
- Born: 18 August 2000 (age 26) Luleå, Sweden
- Home town: Norrköping, Sweden
- Height: 1.76 m (5 ft 9 in)

Figure skating career
- Country: Sweden
- Discipline: Ice dance (since 2023); Men's singles (2011–23)
- Partner: Milla Ruud Reitan
- Coach: Rostislav Sinicyn; Natalia Karamysheva
- Began skating: 2002

Medal record
Swedish Championships
Gold medal – first place	2019 Ulricehamn	Singles
Gold medal – first place	2021 Borlänge Falun	Singles
Gold medal – first place	2024 Norrköping	Ice dance
Gold medal – first place	2025 Västerås	Ice dance
Gold medal – first place	2026 Landskrona	Ice dance
Silver medal – second place	2018 Karlskrona	Singles
Silver medal – second place	2022 Borås	Singles

Nikolaj Majorov (born 18 August 2000) is a Swedish figure skater (men's singles and ice dance). With his skating partner Milla Ruud Reitan, he is a three-time Swedish national champion (2024–26), the 2025 CS Denis Ten Memorial bronze medalist, and competed at the European and World Championships. In addition, they are the first Swedish ice dance team to ever compete at the Winter Olympics (2026).

In men's singles, he is a two-time Swedish national champion (2020, 2022), competed in the final segment at three ISU Championships, and represented Sweden at the 2022 Winter Olympics.

Majorov is the first ever skater to qualify for both the singles and ice dance disciplines at the Winter Olympics.

== Career ==
=== Singles skating ===
==== Early years ====
Majorov began learning to skate in 2002. He competed in the advanced novice ranks through February 2015. His junior international debut came in October 2015 at the International Cup of Nice. He placed thirty-first at the 2017 World Junior Championships in Taipei, Taiwan.

At the junior level, he is the 2016 Swedish junior national champion, a two-time Nordics champion (2016, 2017), and represented his country at the 2019 World Junior Championships.

==== 2018–2019 season: Senior international debut ====
Majorov made his senior international debut in October at the 2018 Finlandia Trophy. He won silver at the Swedish Championships in December. Along with his brother, he was assigned to the 2019 European Championships, which took place in January in Minsk, Belarus. He placed twenty-seventh in the short program, but did not advance further.

In March, Majorov qualified to the final segment at the 2019 World Junior Championships in Zagreb, Croatia. He ranked twenty-third in the short program, twentieth in the free skate, and twenty-first overall.

==== 2019–2020 season: First National title ====
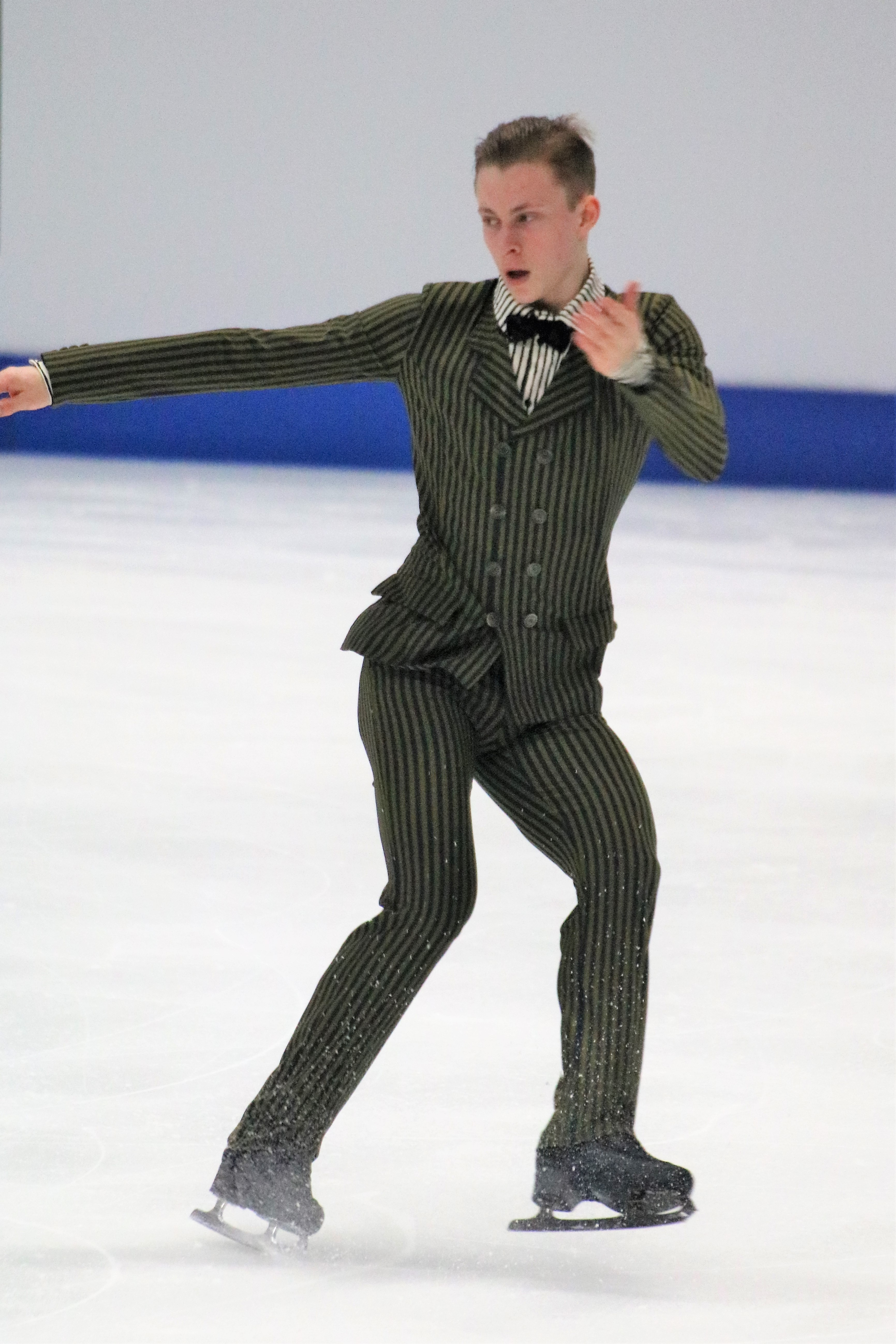
Majorov at the 2020 European Championships

Majorov started his season at the 2019 Nebelhorn Trophy, where he placed eighth. His season continued at the 2019 Warsaw Cup, where he placed eleventh. He won his first Swedish national title in December. He was named to the 2019 European Figure Skating Championships, where he placed fifteenth. Majorov was assigned to make his World Championship debut in Montreal, Canada, but the championships were cancelled as a result of the COVID-19 pandemic.

==== 2020–2021 season ====
Majorov started his season off at the 2020 Nebelhorn Trophy, which, due to the pandemic, was attended only by skaters in Europe. Sixth in the short program, he scored a personal best in the free skate and won the bronze medal. He was assigned to make his Grand Prix debut at the 2020 Internationaux de France, but this event was cancelled as a result of the pandemic.

He participated at the 2021 World Championships, held in Sweden, where he placed twentieth in the short program and twenty-third in the free program to finish twenty-third overall. This result qualified a men's place for Sweden at the 2022 Winter Olympics. In the free skate, he became the first Swede to land a quadruple Salchow in competition.

==== 2021–2022 season: Beijing Olympics ====
Debuting at the 2021 Finlandia Trophy, Majorov finished fourth in the short program but fell to seventeenth overall after finishing twenty-second in the free skate. In later Challenger appearances, he finished fourteenth at the 2021 Warsaw Cup, but withdrew from the 2021 Golden Spin of Zagreb.

After winning a silver medal at the NRW Trophy, Majorov was assigned to compete at the 2022 European Championships, but was forced to withdraw after testing positive for COVID-19. Days later it was announced that the Swedish Olympic Committee had decided to allow both Majorov and Josefin Taljegård to take up the Olympic berths they had earned at the previous World Championships. Majorov said that on hearing the news, "I could not believe it, it became so unreal. That reality became what I wanted, my dream came true." Competing in the Olympic men's event, he placed twentieth in the short program, qualifying to the free skate. He finished twenty-first overall. He was nineteenth at the 2022 World Championships to end the season.

==== 2022–2023 season ====
Majorov competed in two Challenger events to begin the season, finishing seventh at the 2022 Finlandia Trophy and eighth at the 2022 Ice Challenge. He then made his Grand Prix debut at the 2022 Grand Prix of Espoo, placing sixth.

Following the end of the season, Majorov announced his plans to represent Sweden in ice dance due to a back injury worsened by jumping. It was subsequently reported that he had partnered up with Norwegian-born ice dancer, Milla Ruud Reitan, and that the team would train in Oberstdorf, Germany under Rostislav Sinicyn and Natalia Karamysheva.

=== Ice dance with Milla Ruud Reitan ===
==== 2023–2024 season: Debut of Reitan/Majorov ====
Reitan/Majorov debuted as a team at the 2023 Nebelhorn Trophy, where they placed thirteenth and earned a high enough technical score in the rhythm dance to compete at the European Championships. They next competed at the 2023 Budapest Trophy, finishing eighth, and earning the minimum technical scores to compete at both the European and World championships. They subsequently finished fourth at the 2023 CS Denis Ten Memorial Challenge.

In December, the team won their first national title at the 2024 Swedish Championships. The following month, they competed at the 2024 European Championships in Kaunas, Lithuania and placed twenty-seventh with a technical error. In March, they competed at the 2024 World Championships in Montreal, Quebec, Canada. They were the first Swedish ice dance team to compete at the World Championships since 1982. They placed twenty-eighth and did not advance to the free dance. However, Majorov said they were "incredibly satisfied" with their score and that he did not think they could have performed better.

==== 2024–2025 season ====
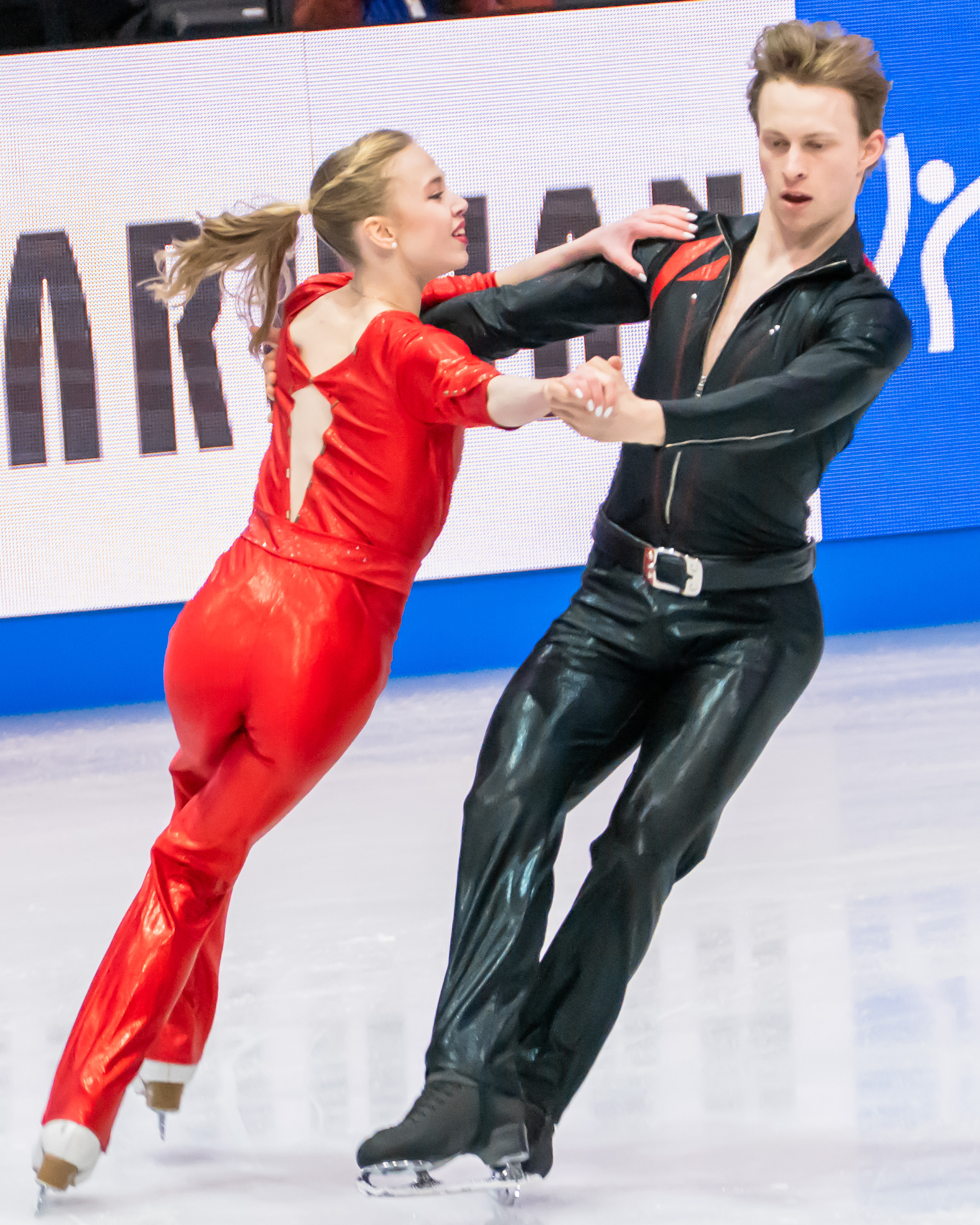
Reitan/Majorov performing their rhythm dance at the 2025 World Championships

Reitan/Majorov started the season by competing on the 2024–25 Challenger Series, placing ninth at the 2024 CS Denis Ten Memorial Challenge, sixth at the 2024 CS Nepela Memorial, and ninth at the 2024 CS Warsaw Cup.

In December, they won their second consecutive national title at the 2025 Swedish Championships. They followed up this result by winning silver at the 2025 Bavarian Open. Going on to compete at the 2025 European Championships in Tallinn, Estonia, Reitan/Majorov finished the event in seventeenth place. They then went on to win gold at the 2025 Maria Olszewska Memorial.

Reitan/Majorov finished the season by competing at the 2025 World Championships in Boston, Massachusetts, United States. They placed twenty-fifth in the rhythm dance and did not advance to the free dance segment.

==== 2025–26 season: Milano Cortina Olympics ====
Reitan/Majorov opened their season by competing at the final Olympic qualifying event, the 2025 Skate to Milano, finishing fifth overall. They were subsequently named as the first alternates for the 2026 Winter Olympic ice dance team.

They then went on to compete on the 2025–26 Challenger Series, winning bronze at the 2025 CS Denis Ten Memorial Challenge. One month later, they competed at the 2025 CS Warsaw Cup but withdrew following the rhythm dance.

In early December, it was announced that Skating Finland had given up their second ice dance berth for the 2026 Winter Olympics. As a result, the Olympic spot was given to Reitan/Majorov, making it the first time in history that a Swedish ice dance team had qualified for the Winter Olympics. Whether Reitan/Majorov can accept this berth will be dependent on if Reitan will be able to obtain Swedish citizenship before the end of January. That same month, the team won their third consecutive national title at the 2026 Swedish Championships.

In early January, it was announced that Reitan had managed to obtain Swedish citizenship, making her and Majorov eligible to compete at the upcoming Olympics. In addition, Majorov became the first ever figure skater to qualify for both the singles and ice dance disciplines at the Winter Olympic Games. That same month, Reitan/Majorov finished thirteenth at the 2026 European Championships in Sheffield, England, United Kingdom. In February, they competed the 2026 Winter Olympics placing 19th at the rhythm dance and 20th in the free dance for a 20th place finish. Furthermore, Majorov became the first ever figure skater to reach the final segment in both singles and ice dance at the Winter Olympics. In March, Reitan and Majorov closed their season at the 2026 World Figure Skating Championships in Prague, finishing 29th.

== Personal life ==
Majorov was born on 18 August 2000 in Luleå, Sweden. His parents, Alexander Majorov Sr., a figure skating coach, and Irina Majorova, a choreographer and dance teacher, moved to Sweden from Russia. He is the younger brother of Swedish figure skater Alexander Majorov.

He has stated that his career goal following his competitive skating career is to become a police officer. In 2025, he and his ice dance partner, Milla Ruud Reitan, confirmed that they were in a relationship.

== Programs ==
=== Ice dance with Milla Ruud Reitan ===
Season	Rhythm dance	Free dance
2023–2024	The Race (Club Mix); La Habanera; I Love You; The Race (Club Mix) by Yello choreo. by Maria Tumanovska-Chaika	The Spy and the Liar (from I Expect You to Die 2: The Spy and the Liar) by Schell Games, Jared Emerson-Johnson, & Mike Geier; I Expect You to Die (from I Expect You to Die) by Schell Games, Bonnie Bogovich, & The Yinzer Singers choreo. by Maria Tumanovska-Chaika
2024–2025	The Ballroom Blitz by The Sweet, Nicky Chinn, & Mike Chapman; Proud Mary by Tina Turner, John Fogerty, & Ike Turner choreo. by Maria Tumanovska-Chaika	Les Parapluies de Cherbourg by Michel Legrand performed by Nana Mouskouri & Mario Pelchat choreo. by Maria Tumanovska-Chaika
2025–2026	Livin' la Vida Loca by Ricky Martin, Draco Rosa, & Desmond Child; Te Extraño, Te Olvido, Te Amo by Ricky Martin & Carlos Lara; La Copa de la Vida by Ricky Martin, Luis Gómez-Escolar, Desmond Child, & Draco Rosa choreo. by Andrea Vaturi	Un Giorno Per Noi (Romeo and Juliet) by Nino Rota performed by Josh Groban choreo. by Andrea Vaturi

=== Singles skating ===
Season	Short program	Free skating	Exhibition
2022–2023	Rise by The Frames choreo. by Alexander Majorov	The Man in the Iron Mask by Nick Glennie-Smith choreo. by Alexander Majorov	
2021–2022	The Sound of Silence by Simon & Garfunkel performed by Disturbed choreo. by Alexander Majorov	The Man in the Iron Mask by Nick Glennie-Smith choreo. by Alexander Majorov	
2020–2021	Writing's on the Wall by Sam Smith	Sayuri's Theme (from Memoirs of a Geisha) by John Williams	The Stroke by Billy Squier
2019–2020	Run Boy Run by Woodkid	The Addams Family by Andrew Lippa	
2018–2019	Flamenco – Street Passion by Didulia	The Addams Family by Andrew Lippa	
2017–2018	Bom Bom Pow; Pump It performed by Black Eyed Peas	Pirates of the Caribbean by Hans Zimmer	
2016–2017	Dream a Little Dream of Me performed by Michael Bublé; Love You Baby by Frank Sinatra	Hungarian Dance No. 5 by Johannes Brahms; Hungarian Rhapsody No. 2 by Franz Liszt; Czardas by Vittorio Monti	

== Competitive highlights ==
- GP – Event of the ISU Grand Prix Series
- JGP – Event of the ISU Junior Grand Prix Series
- CS – Event of the ISU Challenger Series
- TBD – Assigned
- WD – Withdrew from competition
- C – Event was cancelled

=== Ice dance with Milla Ruud Reitan ===
Competition placements at senior level
Season	2023–24	2024–25	2025–26	2026-27
Winter Olympics			20th	
World Championships	28th	25th	29th	
European Championships	27th	17th	13th	
Swedish Championships	1st	1st	1st	
GP Finland				TBD
GP France				7th
CS Denis Ten Memorial	4th	9th	3rd	
CS Nebelhorn Trophy	13th			
CS Nepela Memorial		6th		
CS Warsaw Cup		9th	WD	
CS Budapest Trophy	8th			
Maria Olszewska Memorial		1st		
Bavarian Open	5th	2nd	1st	
Skate to Milano			5th	

=== Single skating ===
Competition placements at senior level
Season	2018–19	2019–20	2020–21	2021–22	2022–23
Winter Olympics				21st	
World Championships		C	23rd	19th	
European Championships	27th	15th		WD	
Swedish Championships	2nd	1st	C	1st	2nd
GP Finland					6th
CS Finlandia Trophy	17th			17th	7th
CS Golden Spin of Zagreb	14th			WD	
CS Ice Challenge					8th
CS Nebelhorn Trophy		8th	3rd		
CS Warsaw Cup		11th		14th	
Bavarian Open		2nd			
NRW Trophy				2nd	
Volvo Open Cup	7th				

Competition placements at junior level
Season	2015–16	2016–17	2017–18	2018–19	2019–20
World Junior Championships		31st		21st	13th
Swedish Championships	1st		2nd		
JGP Canada				9th	
JGP Estonia		10th			
JGP Latvia			13th		
JGP Lithuania				7th	
Bavarian Open			4th		
Coupe du Printemps	2nd		3rd		
Cup of Nice	6th	8th			
European Youth Olympic Festival		10th			
Golden Spin of Zagreb			2nd		
Kaunas Autumn Cup			1st		
Nordic Championships	1st	1st			
Sofia Trophy	2nd				
Tallinn Trophy			8th		

== Detailed results ==
=== Ice dance with Milla Ruud Reitan ===
ISU personal best scores in the +5/-5 GOE System
Segment	Type	Score	Event
Total	TSS	177.25	2025 CS Denis Ten Memorial Challenge
Rhythm dance	TSS	69.30	2025 Skate to Milano
Rhythm dance	TES	40.52	2025 Skate to Milano
Rhythm dance	PCS	29.73	2026 European Championships
Free dance	TSS	108.03	2025 CS Denis Ten Memorial Challenge
Free dance	TES	61.93	2025 CS Denis Ten Memorial Challenge
Free dance	PCS	46.44	2026 European Championships

Results in the 2023–24 season
Date	Event	RD		FD		Total	
Date	Event	P	Score	P	Score	P	Score
Sep 20–23, 2023	(Germany) 2023 CS Nebelhorn Trophy	12	56.43	13	85.43	13	141.86
Oct 12–15, 2023	(Hungary) 2023 CS Budapest Trophy	10	60.69	9	94.10	8	154.79
Nov 1–4, 2023	(Kazakhstan) 2023 CS Denis Ten Memorial Challenge	5	62.94	4	97.82	4	160.76
Dec 14–17, 2023	(Sweden) 2024 Swedish Championships	1	64.50	1	91.98	1	156.48
Jan 8–14, 2024	(Lithuania) 2024 European Championships	27	54.89	—N/a	—N/a	27	54.89
Jan 30 – Feb 4, 2024	(Germany) 2024 Bavarian Open	6	61.02	5	96.37	5	157.39
Mar 18–24, 2024	(Canada) 2024 World Championships	28	61.13	—N/a	—N/a	28	61.13

Results in the 2024–25 season
Date	Event	RD		FD		Total	
Date	Event	P	Score	P	Score	P	Score
Oct 2–5, 2024	(Kazakhstan) 2024 CS Denis Ten Memorial Challenge	11	58.88	8	101.90	9	160.78
Oct 24–26, 2024	(Czech Republic) 2024 CS Nepela Memorial	6	66.87	6	105.69	6	172.56
Nov 20–24, 2024	(Poland) 2024 CS Warsaw Cup	11	65.47	8	101.78	9	167.25
Dec 12–15, 2024	(Sweden) 2025 Swedish Championships	1	66.66	1	101.16	1	167.82
Jan 20–26, 2025	(Germany) 2025 Bavarian Open	63	67.41	2	105.43	2	172.84
Jan 28 – Feb 2, 2025	(Estonia) 2025 European Championships	17	62.19	18	100.05	17	162.24
Mar 4–9, 2025	(Poland) 2025 Maria Olszewska Memorial	2	64.67	1	108.48	1	173.15
Mar 24–30, 2025	(United States) 2025 World Championships	25	64.98	—N/a	—N/a	25	64.98

Results in the 2025–26 season
Date	Event	RD		FD		Total	
Date	Event	P	Score	P	Score	P	Score
Sep 18–21, 2025	(China) 2025 ISU Skate to Milano	4	69.30	6	99.30	5	168.60
Oct 1–4, 2025	(Kazakhstan) 2025 CS Denis Ten Memorial Challenge	3	69.22	2	108.03	3	177.25
Nov 19–23, 2025	(Poland) 2025 CS Warsaw Cup	22	55.81	–	–	–	WD
Dec 12–14, 2025	(Sweden) 2026 Swedish Championships	1	73.09	1	111.48	1	184.57
Jan 13–18, 2026	(United Kingdom) 2026 European Championships	12	68.89	12	106.75	13	175.74
Feb 9-11, 2026	(Italy) 2026 Winter Olympics	19	67.31	20	97.74	20	165.05
Mar 24–29, 2026	(Czech Republic) 2026 World Championships	29	58.20	—N/a	—N/a	29	58.20

Results in the 2026–27 season
Date	Event	SP		FS		Total	
Date	Event	P	Score	P	Score	P	Score
Oct 23–25, 2026	2026 Grand Prix de France	8	63.01	6	92.94	7	155.95

=== Single skating ===
ISU personal best scores in the +5/-5 GOE System
Segment	Type	Score	Event
Total	TSS	220.78	2022 Winter Olympics
Short program	TSS	81.48	2021 CS Finlandia Trophy
Short program	TES	41.65	2021 CS Finlandia Trophy
Short program	PCS	39.83	2021 CS Finlandia Trophy
Free skating	TSS	145.53	2020 CS Nebelhorn Trophy
Free skating	TES	74.33	2020 CS Nebelhorn Trophy
Free skating	PCS	74.79	2022 Grand Prix of Espoo

ISU personal best scores in the +3/-3 GOE System
Segment	Type	Score	Event
Total	TSS	163.31	2018 JGP Estonia
Short program	TSS	54.18	2018 JGP Estonia
Short program	TES	27.46	2018 JGP Estonia
Short program	PCS	27.75	2018 JGP Latvia
Free skating	TSS	109.13	2018 JGP Estonia
Free skating	TES	55.68	2018 JGP Latvia
Free skating	PCS	57.64	2018 JGP Estonia

==== Senior level ====
Results in the 2018–19 season
Date	Event	SP		FS		Total	
Date	Event	P	Score	P	Score	P	Score
Oct 4–7, 2018	(Finland) 2018 CS Finlandia Trophy	7	73.41	11	129.14	11	202.55
Nov 6–11, 2018	(Latvia) 2018 Volvo Open Cup	6	61.92	6	126.06	7	187.98
Dec 5–8, 2018	(Croatia) 2018 CS Golden Spin of Zagreb	5	83.87	7	143.60	6	227.47
Dec 12–16, 2018	(Sweden) 2018 Swedish Championships	2	71.42	2	124.88	2	196.30
Jan 21–27, 2019	(Belarus) 2019 European Championships	11	79.88	8	145.50	8	225.38

Results in the 2019–20 season
Date	Event	SP		FS		Total	
Date	Event	P	Score	P	Score	P	Score
Sep 25–28, 2019	(Germany) 2019 CS Nebelhorn Trophy	12	55.92	6	130.44	8	186.36
Nov 14–17, 2019	(Poland) 2019 CS Warsaw Cup	19	55.82	6	126.58	11	182.40
Dec 12–15, 2019	(Sweden) 2019 Swedish Championships	1	74.96	1	140.50	1	215.46
Jan 20–26, 2020	(Austria) 2020 European Championships	14	74.39	15	138.18	15	212.57
Feb 3–9, 2020	(Germany) 2020 Bavarian Open	6	66.74	2	143.97	2	210.71

Results in the 2020–21 season
Date	Event	SP		FS		Total	
Date	Event	P	Score	P	Score	P	Score
Sep 23–26, 2020	(Germany) 2020 CS Nebelhorn Trophy	6	72.54	3	145.53	3	218.07
Mar 22–28, 2021	(Sweden) 2021 World Championships	20	75.59	23	117.20	23	192.79

Results in the 2021–22 season
Date	Event	SP		FS		Total	
Date	Event	P	Score	P	Score	P	Score
Oct 7–10, 2021	(Finland) 2021 CS Finlandia Trophy	4	81.48	22	107.35	17	188.83
Nov 4–7, 2021	(Germany) 2021 NRW Trophy	2	69.84	2	127.47	2	197.31
Nov 17–20, 2021	(Poland) 2021 CS Warsaw Cup	15	67.02	14	131.72	14	198.74
Dec 15–18, 2021	(Sweden) 2021 Swedish Championships	1	74.19	1	164.15	1	238.34
Feb 4–20, 2022	(China) 2022 Winter Olympics	20	78.54	21	142.24	21	220.78
Mar 21–27, 2022	(France) 2022 World Championships	19	79.36	20	137.09	19	216.45

Results in the 2022–23 season
Date	Event	SP		FS		Total	
Date	Event	P	Score	P	Score	P	Score
Oct 4–9, 2022	(Finland) 2022 CS Finlandia Trophy	9	67.94	7	134.95	7	202.89
Nov 9–13, 2022	(Austria) 2022 CS Ice Challenge	7	65.72	9	131.81	8	197.53
Nov 25–27, 2022	(Finland) 2022 Grand Prix of Espoo	8	69.94	6	139.61	6	209.55
Dec 15–18, 2022	(Sweden) 2022 Swedish Championships	2	69.79	1	146.64	2	216.43

==== Junior level ====
Results in the 2015–16 season
Date	Event	SP		FS		Total	
Date	Event	P	Score	P	Score	P	Score
Oct 14–18, 2015	(France) 2015 International Cup of Nice	5	46.50	7	87.61	6	134.11
Dec 10–13, 2015	(Sweden) 2015 Swedish Championships	1	49.44	1	101.91	1	151.35
Feb 10–14, 2016	(Bulgaria) 2016 Sofia Trophy	2	51.90	2	89.74	2	141.64
Feb 24–28, 2016	(Denmark) 2016 Nordic Championships	1	53.70	1	109.50	1	163.20
Mar 11–13, 2016	(Luxembourg) 2016 Coupe du Printemps	2	51.29	4	92.89	2	144.18

Results in the 2016–17 season
Date	Event	SP		FS		Total	
Date	Event	P	Score	P	Score	P	Score
Sep 28 – Oct 1, 2016	2018 JGP Estonia	12	54.18	10	109.13	10	163.31
Oct 19–23, 2016	(France) 2016 International Cup of Nice	9	48.76	9	93.22	8	141.98
Feb 11–18, 2017	(Turkey) 2017 European Youth Olympic Festival	10	43.95	10	81.02	10	124.97
Mar 2–5, 2017	(Iceland) 2017 Nordic Championships	1	55.16	2	94.42	1	149.58
Mar 15–19, 2017	(Taiwan) 2017 World Junior Championships	31	52.42	—N/a	—N/a	31	52.42

Results in the 2017–18 season
Date	Event	SP		FS		Total	
Date	Event	P	Score	P	Score	P	Score
Sep 6–9, 2017	2018 JGP Latvia	17	49.03	8	107.68	13	156.71
Sep 20–22, 2017	(Latvia) 2017 Kaunas Ice Autumn Cup	1	55.49	1	106.02	1	161.51
Nov 20–26, 2017	(Estonia) 2017 Tallinn Trophy	9	51.99	7	111.90	8	163.89
Dec 6–9, 2017	(Croatia) 2017 Golden Spin of Zagreb	3	52.26	2	101.08	2	153.34
Dec 13–17, 2017	(Sweden) 2017 Swedish Championships	4	47.85	1	120.08	2	167.93
Jan 26–31, 2018	(Germany) 2018 Bavarian Open	4	61.43	4	114.88	4	176.31
Mar 16–18, 2018	(Luxembourg) 2018 Coupe du Printemps	2	59.76	3	116.47	3	176.23

Results in the 2018–19 season
Date	Event	SP		FS		Total	
Date	Event	P	Score	P	Score	P	Score
Sep 5–8, 2018	2018 JGP Lithuania	8	59.14	7	108.18	7	167.32
Sep 12–15, 2018	2018 JGP Canada	10	60.41	8	108.92	9	169.33
Mar 4–10, 2019	(Croatia) 2019 World Junior Championships	23	61.47	20	115.46	21	176.93

Results in the 2019–20 season
Date	Event	SP		FS		Total	
Date	Event	P	Score	P	Score	P	Score
Mar 2–8, 2020	(Estonia) 2020 World Junior Championships	14	72.49	12	127.36	13	199.85
