= D.I.C.E. Award for Outstanding Achievement in Game Design =

Annual award presented by the Academy of Interactive Arts & Sciences

- Country: United States
- Presented by: Academy of Interactive Arts & Sciences
- First award: 1998
- Currently held by: Blue Prince
- Website: interactive.org

The D.I.C.E. Award for Outstanding Achievement in Game Design is an award presented annually by the Academy of Interactive Arts & Sciences during the D.I.C.E. Awards. This award is "presented to the title that most effectively combines interactive and non-interactive elements to create a cohesive gameplay experience. Outstanding design is exemplified by balanced system design, cohesive mechanics that relate to overall aesthetic direction, level layout, challenge flow, progression elements, interface design, and social game mechanics. This award recognizes the Lead Designer or Design Director in architecting all elements into a unified design". Creative/technical Academy members with expertise as a game designer or producer are qualified to vote for this award.

The award's most recent winner is Blue Prince, developed by Dogubomb and published by Raw Fury.

== History ==
It was originally presented as Outstanding Achievement in Interactive Design; it was later renamed Outstanding Achievement in Game Design at the 3rd Annual Interactive Achievement Awards. A separate award category was offered at the 2010 awards ceremony for Outstanding Achievement in Portable Game Design, presented to the title that makes "the most compelling contribution to the unique opportunities and challenges of portable, mobile and networked game play". This award would not be presented at the ceremonies between 2011 and 2014; however, the category would be offered again in 2015, and had been offered every year since.

- Outstanding Achievement in Interactive Design (1998-1999)
- Outstanding Achievement in Game Design (2000-2010, 2015-present)
- Outstanding Achievement in Portable Game Design (2010)

=== Game Design and Game of the Year ===
More than half of the finalists for the Game Design category were also finalists for Game of the Year. However, only ten winners for Game Design ended up winning Game of the Year:

- The Legend of Zelda: Ocarina of Time
- The Sims
- Overwatch
- The Legend of Zelda: Breath of the Wild
- God of War (2018)
- Hades
- It Takes Two
- Elden Ring
- Baldur's Gate 3
- Astro Bot

The winners for Game Design that were not finalists for Game of the Year (Note: Portal was released as part of The Orange Box, a Game of the Year nominee in 2008.) were:

- Grand Theft Auto III
- World of Goo
- Baba Is You

The Game of the Year winners that were not finalists for Game Design (excluding winners during years when the Game Design category was not offered) were:

- Diablo II
- Call of Duty
- Gears of War
- LittleBigPlanet
- Dragon Age: Inquisition
- Untitled Goose Game
- Clair Obscur: Expedition 33

2001 and 2008 were the only years that all finalists for Game Design were finalists for Game of the Year.

In 2009, the PlayStation Portable release of LittleBigPlanet and Scribblenauts were finalists for Portable Game of the Year in addition to Outstanding Achievement in Portable Game Design; Scribblenauts would be the winner for both awards.

Two virtual reality games were nominated for Outstanding Achievement in Game Design: I Expect You to Die and Half-Life: Alyx.

== Winners and nominees ==
=== 1990s ===
Table key
Indicates the winner

Year	Game	Developer(s)	Publisher(s)	Ref.
1997/1998 (Note: Presented as Outstanding Achievement in Interactive Design.) (1st)	PaRappa the Rapper	NanaOn-Sha	Sony Computer Entertainment	
1997/1998 (1st)	Dungeon Keeper	Bullfrog Productions	Electronic Arts	
1997/1998 (1st)	Final Fantasy VII	SquareSoft	Sony Computer Entertainment	
1997/1998 (1st)	GoldenEye 007	Rare	Nintendo	
1998/1999 (2nd)	The Legend of Zelda: Ocarina of Time	Nintendo EAD	Nintendo	
1998/1999 (2nd)	Half-Life	Valve	Sierra On-Line	
1998/1999 (2nd)	Metal Gear Solid	Konami	Konami	
1998/1999 (2nd)	Pokémon Red and Blue	Game Freak	Nintendo	
1998/1999 (2nd)	Sid Meier's Alpha Centauri	Firaxis Games	Electronic Arts	
1999/2000 (3rd)	The Sims	Maxis	Electronic Arts	
1999/2000 (3rd)	Age of Empires II: The Age of Kings	Ensemble Studios	Microsoft Games	
1999/2000 (3rd)	Gran Turismo 2	Polyphony Digital	Sony Computer Entertainment	
1999/2000 (3rd)	Nox	Westwood Studios	Westwood Studios, Electronic Arts	
1999/2000 (3rd)	Syphon Filter	Eidetic	989 Studios	

=== 2000s ===
Year	Game	Developer(s)	Publisher(s)	Ref.
2000 (4th)	The Legend of Zelda: Majora's Mask	Nintendo EAD	Nintendo	
2000 (4th)	Jet Grind Radio	Smilebit	Sega	
2000 (4th)	Rayman 2: The Great Escape	Ubi Pictures	Ubisoft	
2000 (4th)	Shenmue	Sega AM2	Sega	
2000 (4th)	Tony Hawk's Pro Skater 2	Neversoft	Activision	
2001 (5th)	Grand Theft Auto III	DMA Design	Rockstar Games	
2001 (5th)	Dark Age of Camelot	Mythic Entertainment	Vivendi Universal Games	
2001 (5th)	Halo: Combat Evolved	Bungie	Microsoft Game Studios	
2001 (5th)	Ico	Japan Studio	Sony Computer Entertainment	
2001 (5th)	Jak & Daxter: The Precursor Legacy	Naughty Dog	Sony Computer Entertainment	
2001 (5th)	Pikmin	Nintendo EAD	Nintendo	
2002 (6th)	Animal Crossing	Nintendo EAD	Nintendo	
2002 (6th)	Battlefield 1942	DICE	Electronic Arts	
2002 (6th)	Metroid Prime	Retro Studios	Nintendo	
2002 (6th)	Neverwinter Nights	BioWare	Infogrames	
2002 (6th)	Warcraft III: Reign of Chaos	Blizzard Entertainment	Blizzard Entertainment	
2003 (7th)	Prince of Persia: The Sands of Time	Ubisoft Montreal	Ubisoft	
2003 (7th)	Amplitude	Harmonix	Sony Computer Entertainment	
2003 (7th)	Star Wars: Knights of the Old Republic	BioWare	LucasArts	
2003 (7th)	The Legend of Zelda: The Wind Waker	Nintendo EAD	Nintendo	
2003 (7th)	Tony Hawk's Underground	Neversoft	Activision	
2004 (8th)	Katamari Damacy	Namco	Namco	
2004 (8th)	City of Heroes	Cryptic Studios	NCSoft	
2004 (8th)	Fable	Lionhead Studios	Microsoft Game Studios	
2004 (8th)	Grand Theft Auto: San Andreas	Rockstar North	Rockstar Games	
2004 (8th)	Half-Life 2	Valve	Vivendi Universal Games	
2005 (9th)	Guitar Hero	Harmonix	RedOctane	
2005 (9th)	God of War	Santa Monica Studio	Sony Computer Entertainment	
2005 (9th)	King Kong	Ubisoft Montpellier	Ubisoft	
2005 (9th)	Nintendogs	Nintendo EAD	Nintendo	
2005 (9th)	Psychonauts	Double Fine Productions	Majesco	
2006 (10th)	Wii Sports	Nintendo EAD	Nintendo	
2006 (10th)	Brain Age: Train Your Brain in Minutes a Day!	Nintendo SPD	Nintendo	
2006 (10th)	Company of Heroes	Relic Entertainment	THQ	
2006 (10th)	The Elder Scrolls IV: Oblivion	Bethesda Game Studios	2K Games	
2006 (10th)	The Legend of Zelda: Twilight Princess	Nintendo EAD	Nintendo	
2007 (11th)	Portal	Valve	Valve	
2007 (11th)	BioShock	2K Boston, 2K Australia	2K Games	
2007 (11th)	Call of Duty 4: Modern Warfare	Infinity Ward	Activision	
2007 (11th)	Rock Band	Harmonix	MTV Games	
2007 (11th)	Super Mario Galaxy	Nintendo EAD	Nintendo	
2008 (12th)	World of Goo	2D Boy	2D Boy, Nintendo	
2008 (12th)	Fable II	Lionhead Studios	Microsoft Game Studios	
2008 (12th)	Fallout 3	Bethesda Game Studios	Bethesda Softworks	
2008 (12th)	Gears of War 2	Epic Games	Microsoft Game Studios	
2008 (12th)	Left 4 Dead	Valve South	Valve	
2009 (13th)	Outstanding Achievement in Game Design			
2009 (13th)	Batman: Arkham Asylum	Rocksteady Studios	Warner Bros. Interactive Entertainment	
2009 (13th)	Call of Duty: Modern Warfare 2	Infinity Ward	Activision	
2009 (13th)	Mario & Luigi: Bowser's Inside Story	AlphaDream	Nintendo	
2009 (13th)	Plants vs. Zombies	PopCap Games	PopCap Games	
2009 (13th)	Uncharted 2: Among Thieves	Naughty Dog	Sony Computer Entertainment	
2009 (13th)	Outstanding Achievement in Portable Game Design			
2009 (13th)	Scribblenauts	5th Cell	Warner Bros. Interactive Entertainment	
2009 (13th)	Henry Hatsworth in the Puzzling Adventure	EA Tiburon	Electronic Arts	
2009 (13th)	LittleBigPlanet	Cambridge Studio	Sony Computer Entertainment	
2009 (13th)	LocoRoco 2	Japan Studio	Sony Computer Entertainment	
2009 (13th)	Patapon 2	Japan Studio	Sony Computer Entertainment	

=== 2010s ===
The Outstanding Achievement in Game Design category was not offered at the awards ceremonies from 2011 to 2014.

Year	Game	Developer(s)	Publisher(s)	Ref.
2014 (18th)	Middle-earth: Shadow of Mordor	Monolith Productions	Warner Bros. Interactive Entertainment	
2014 (18th)	Dungeon of the Endless	Amplitude Studios	Amplitude Studios	
2014 (18th)	Far Cry 4	Ubisoft Montreal	Ubisoft	
2014 (18th)	Hearthstone: Heroes of Warcraft	Blizzard Entertainment	Blizzard Entertainment	
2014 (18th)	Titanfall	Respawn Entertainment	Electronic Arts	
2015 (19th)	The Witcher 3: Wild Hunt	CD Projekt Red	CD Projekt	
2015 (19th)	Fallout 4	Bethesda Game Studios	Bethesda Softworks	
2015 (19th)	Her Story	Sam Barlow	Sam Barlow	
2015 (19th)	Lara Croft Go	Square Enix Montreal	Square Enix Europe	
2015 (19th)	Massive Chalice	Double Fine Productions	Double Fine Productions	
2016 (20th)	Overwatch	Blizzard Entertainment	Blizzard Entertainment	
2016 (20th)	I Expect You to Die	Schell Games	Schell Games	
2016 (20th)	Inside	Playdead	Playdead	
2016 (20th)	Owlboy	D-Pad Studio	D-Pad Studio	
2016 (20th)	Uncharted 4: A Thief's End	Naughty Dog	Sony Interactive Entertainment	
2017 (21st)	The Legend of Zelda: Breath of the Wild	Nintendo EPD	Nintendo	
2017 (21st)	Gorogoa	Jason Roberts	Annapurna Interactive	
2017 (21st)	Horizon Zero Dawn	Guerrilla Games	Sony Interactive Entertainment	
2017 (21st)	PlayerUnknown's Battlegrounds	PUBG Corporation	Bluehole	
2017 (21st)	Super Mario Odyssey	Nintendo EPD	Nintendo	
2018 (22nd)	God of War	Santa Monica Studio	Sony Interactive Entertainment	
2018 (22nd)	Into the Breach	Subset Games	Subset Games	
2018 (22nd)	Marvel's Spider-Man	Insomniac Games	Sony Interactive Entertainment	
2018 (22nd)	Return of the Obra Dinn	Lucas Pope	3909	
2018 (22nd)	Subnautica	Unknown Worlds Entertainment	Unknown Worlds Entertainment	
2019 (23rd)	Baba Is You	Hempuli	Hempuli	
2019 (23rd)	Disco Elysium	ZA/UM	ZA/UM	
2019 (23rd)	Outer Wilds	Mobius Digital	Annapurna Interactive	
2019 (23rd)	Sekiro: Shadows Die Twice	FromSoftware	Activision	
2019 (23rd)	Slay the Spire	MegaCrit	Humble Bundle	

=== 2020s ===
Year	Game	Developer(s)	Publisher(s)	Ref.
2020 (24th)	Hades	Supergiant Games	Supergiant Games	
2020 (24th)	Ghost of Tsushima	Sucker Punch Productions	Sony Interactive Entertainment	
2020 (24th)	Half-Life: Alyx	Valve	Valve	
2020 (24th)	The Last of Us Part II	Naughty Dog	Sony Interactive Entertainment	
2020 (24th)	Marvel's Spider-Man: Miles Morales	Insomniac Games	Sony Interactive Entertainment	
2021 (25th)	It Takes Two	Hazelight Studios	Electronic Arts	
2021 (25th)	Deathloop	Arkane Studios	Bethesda Softworks	
2021 (25th)	Inscryption	Daniel Mullins Games	Devolver Digital	
2021 (25th)	Loop Hero	Four Quarters	Devolver Digital	
2021 (25th)	Ratchet & Clank: Rift Apart	Insomniac Games	Sony Interactive Entertainment	
2022 (26th)	Elden Ring	FromSoftware	Bandai Namco Entertainment	
2022 (26th)	God of War Ragnarök	Santa Monica Studio	Sony Interactive Entertainment	
2022 (26th)	Marvel Snap	Second Dinner	Nuverse	
2022 (26th)	Tunic	Isometricorps Games	Finji	
2022 (26th)	Vampire Survivors	poncle	poncle	
2023 (27th)	Baldur's Gate 3	Larian Studios	Larian Studios	
2023 (27th)	Cocoon	Geometric Interactive	Annapurna Interactive	
2023 (27th)	Dave the Diver	Mintrocket	Mintrocket	
2023 (27th)	Super Mario Bros. Wonder	Nintendo EPD	Nintendo	
2023 (27th)	The Legend of Zelda: Tears of the Kingdom	Nintendo EPD	Nintendo	
2024 (28th)	Astro Bot	Team Asobi	Sony Interactive Entertainment	
2024 (28th)	Animal Well	Shared Memory	Bigmode	
2024 (28th)	Balatro	LocalThunk	PlayStack	
2024 (28th)	Helldivers 2	Arrowhead Game Studios	Sony Interactive Entertainment	
2024 (28th)	UFO 50	Mossmouth	Mossmouth	
2025 (29th)	Blue Prince	Dogubomb	Raw Fury	
2025 (29th)	ARC Raiders	Embark Studios	Embark Studios	
2025 (29th)	Hades II	Supergiant Games	Supergiant Games	
2025 (29th)	Kingdom Come: Deliverance II	Warhorse Studios	Deep Silver	
2025 (29th)	Öoo	Nama Takahashi	Nama Takahashi	

== Multiple nominations and wins ==
=== Developers and publishers ===
Nintendo is the most nominated developer in this category, and the only developer to have won more than once; Nintendo has also published the most winners, with Sony publishing the most nominees. Warner Bros. Interactive Entertainment has published both winners in 2010 for Game Design and Portable Game Design. In addition, Warner Bros. technically has published back-to-back winners, but the 4-year gap has existed in which the award has not been offered between wins.

Developers
Developer	Nominations	Wins
Nintendo EAD/SPD/EPD	14	5
Valve	4	1
Blizzard Entertainment	3	1
Harmonix	3	1
Santa Monica Studio	3	1
FromSoftware	2	1
DMA Design/Rockstar North	2	1
Supergiant Games	2	1
Ubisoft Montreal	2	1
Naughty Dog	4	0
Bethesda Game Studios	3	0
Japan Studio	3	0
Insomniac Games	3	0
BioWare	2	0
Double Fine Productions	2	0
Infinity Ward	2	0
Lionhead Studios	2	0
Neversoft	2	0
Ubi Pictures/Ubisoft Montpellier	2	0

Publishers
Publisher	Nominations	Wins
Nintendo	19	6
Sony Computer/Interactive Entertainment	22	3
Warner Bros. Interactive Entertainment	3	3
Electronic Arts	8	2
Namco/Bandai Namco Entertainment	2	2
Ubisoft	4	1
Valve	4	1
Rockstar Games	2	1
Supergiant Games	2	1
Activision	5	0
Microsoft Game Studios	5	0
Annapurna Interactive	3	0
Bethesda Softworks	3	0
2K Games	2	0
Devolver Digital	2	0
Sega	2	0
Vivendi Universal Games	2	0

=== Franchises ===
The Legend of Zelda is the most nominated franchise in this category, and is the only franchise to have won more than once.

Franchises
Franchises	Nominations	Wins
The Legend of Zelda	6	3
God of War	3	1
Grand Theft Auto	2	1
Hades	2	1
Mario	4	0
Half-Life	3	0
Marvel (Note: Includes Spider-Man titles.)	3	0
Call of Duty	2	0
Fable	2	0
Fallout	2	0
Marvel's Spider-Man	2	0
Tony Hawk's	2	0
Uncharted	2	0
Warcraft	2	0
