= I Expect You To Die 3: Cog in the Machine =

2023 video game

- Developer: Schell Games
- Publisher: Schell Games
- Series: I Expect You to Die
- Platforms: Meta Quest 2; Meta Quest 3; Meta Quest 3S; Meta Quest Pro; Windows
- Release: Quest 2, Quest Pro; August 17, 2023; Windows; September 28, 2023
- Genres: Action, puzzle
- Mode: Single-player

I Expect You To Die 3: Cog in the Machine is a virtual reality action video game developed and published by Schell Games and released for Meta Quest 2 and Meta Quest Pro on August 17, and Windows on September 28, 2023. It is the third game in the I Expect You to Die series and follows Agent Phoenix, who survived the events of the previous game and must once again confront Zoraxis, which has teamed up with Dr. Roxana Prism.

The theme song Cog in the Machine was sung by Haley Reinhart, written by Franklyn Lubsey and Bay Area Sound, with lyrics by Jared Mason.

== Gameplay ==
Like its predecessors, I Expect You To Die 3: Cog in the Machine is a virtual reality game in which the player must solve puzzle scenarios using objects in the surrounding environment.

== Plot ==
Sometime after miraculously surviving an explosion in the previous game, the player character, now known as Agent Phoenix, makes it to an Agency control point in Babadag, Romania, where they reconnect with their handler, now revealed as Reginald Crane, who was originally distraught after Phoenix's supposed death. After restarting the abandoned control point, the pair begin a new mission involving Doctor Roxana Prism, a former Agency scientist responsible for creating telekinetic implants for agents of the Enhanced Operatives Division.

In the first mission, Phoenix must head over to Prism's home in California and obtain her research on kinesium, a crystal that's used to power the telekinetic implants. During this, they run into Robutler, one of many robots that Prism has made over the years as part of a failed initiative of hers to replace human agents with robots. Upon finding the research, Phoenix and Crane learn that Prism, who was reported missing, is actually working with Dr. Zor and Zoraxis regarding her initiative. Robutler, also revealed to have gone rogue, tries to kill Phoenix, but the latter manages to destroy the former and grab his kinesium crystal before being taunted by Prism that she will prove the Agency wrong.

In the second mission, Phoenix goes undercover as a supervisor at a once-abandoned Agency-run kinesium mine in Pennsylvania to figure out what Prism is up to. During this, they run into Left Robot and Right Robot (who are only named that because of the real supervisor getting mixed up with the robots due to all of them looking and sounding the same). They use a mining drill to gather kinesium, which must be cooled to prevent the crystals from destabilizing and exploding. As Right Robot leaves with some kinesium, Phoenix and Left Robot gather another sample, which the former destabilizes, despite the latter's warnings, and sends into the mine's core, where it explodes, destroying the mine, damaging the drill, and killing Left Robot; the explosion also results in Phoenix blacking out due to their telekinetic implant being affected by a subsequent shockwave. Upon hearing this, Prism sends a third robot to kill Phoenix, only for Phoenix to kill it with the damaged drill before escaping the mine.

In the third mission, the Agency tracks down Prism's self-driving truck as it crosses a bridge over the Bering Strait. Phoenix approaches the truck in a blue Chevrolet Corvette (C3) to steal the mined kinesium, but is attacked by another robot. The robot is disabled and taken back to headquarters.

In the fourth mission, Phoenix goes undercover again at an underwater Zoraxis lab near New Zealand, where they team up with Ollie, an unwitting Zoraxis employee who doesn't know about Zoraxis' true nature. Not only does Phoenix find that Zoraxis is intentionally destabilizing kinesium to cause a chain reaction of explosions and shockwaves, but they also find a cassette tape featuring a message from Doctor Zor, who is aware of Phoenix's survival from the previous game. During this, the experiments provoke a giant, mind-controlled squid to attack the lab, which Phoenix thwarts by breaking the squid's shackles and its mind control headband. Phoenix and Ollie then escape the sunken lab, with the former grabbing a shield generator that was used in the experiments.

In the fifth mission, Phoenix travels to Japan, where they use a Zoraxis gondola to travel to Prism's factory in the mountains, having extracted the location from the robot that was captured in the third mission. After getting the gondola to move, Phoenix is then confronted by Prism's robots, who are now able to fly. After destroying three of them, Phoenix is then confronted by Prism herself, who unleashes an army of her robots to kill Phoenix, but before she could do so, an explosion at her factory sets off an enormous kinesium shockwave, killing all of her robots and causing her and Phoenix to crash to the ground. Afterwards, Prism realizes that Zoraxis just wanted to use her research for their own purposes and plans her revenge, while Phoenix, after watching her leave, uses a flare gun to call for a helicopter.

In the sixth mission, Phoenix heads over to a volcano in the South Pacific, where they find a giant Zoraxis machine designed to destabilize a kinesium boulder and cause a shockwave that could short-circuit all telekinetic implants, electrocuting all of the Enhanced Operatives Division (EOD) agents to death. Prism also shows up, and she reluctantly teams up with Phoenix to face the common problem of destroying the facility. After tampering with the machine, Zor causes an artificial eruption as a backup plan, and Prism nearly falls into the lava, but Phoenix rescues her, and she comes to realize that her robots would've focused more on the mission instead of helping lives. They then get to work tampering with the destabilizers to create a shield around the kinesium to contain the shockwave's effects. However, they notice that the destabilizers are too far apart, prompting Phoenix to use their telekinesis to simultaneously bring the destabilizers close enough to form a shield, just as the explosion occurs. Zor gives off one final taunt for Phoenix before disappearing again, and as the volcano starts to erupt, Prism drags the now-unconscious Phoenix out of the volcano before leaving them on a beach far away from the volcano.

During the end credits, Prism sends a message through Phoenix's earpiece, declaring that while she misses her robots, she finally accepts the importance of human agents and realizes that the telekinetic implant was meant for Phoenix. After the credits, the robot from the third mission, having been reactivated, calls Phoenix to show that he's now a member of the team, much to Reginald's dismay.

== Cast ==
- Jared Mason: Support Agent Reginald Crane
- Daisy Lightfoot: Dr. Roxana Prism (Hailey Reinhart as her singing voice in the game's opening)
- Luis Bermudez: Robots

== Reception ==
=== Critical reception ===
Reception

Aggregate scores
Aggregator	Score
Metacritic	89/100
OpenCritic	89/100

Review score
Publication	Score
TechRadar	3/5

I Expect You to Die received positive reviews from critics, garnering "generally favorable reviews" according to review aggregator website Metacritic, as well as "Very Positive" user reviews on Steam.

=== Awards ===
- Winner in the Independent Game of the Year, Meta Quest VR Escape Room Game, and Meta Quest VR Puzzle Game categories at the 2024 NYX Game Awards.
- 2024 XR Accolade for Story-Driven and Narrative Experience during the 8th International XR Awards.
- Silver Winner for "Use of VR" at the 2024 Telly Awards.
- 2024 finalist for Best Game or Toy during the 15th Annual Auggie Awards.
- Nominated for XR Game of the Year in 2024 for the 16th Unity Awards.
