= D.I.C.E. Award for Immersive Reality Game of the Year =

Annual award presented by the Academy of Interactive Arts & Sciences

- Country: United States
- Presented by: Academy of Interactive Arts & Sciences
- First award: 2017
- Currently held by: Ghost Town
- Website: interactive.org

The D.I.C.E. Award for Immersive Reality Game of the Year is an award presented annually by the Academy of Interactive Arts & Sciences during the D.I.C.E. Awards. This award recognizes "the single game released on an immersive reality platform that best utilizes the attributes of the platform to entertain users. Elements of design, direction, and narrative are factored into the title selection".

The award's most recent winner is Ghost Town, developed and published by Fireproof Studios.

== Immersive Reality Game of the Year and Technical Achievement ==
Both immersive reality awards were introduced for the 20th Annual D.I.C.E. Awards. According to the rules and procedures for the 20th awards ceremony, "the immersive reality category panel will be comprised of individuals working directly in the medium". The finalists and winners for these categories would be "selected by a panel of experts and will not be voted on by the general membership body of the Academy". Since the categories were introduced, both categories have had several finalists and winners in common. Lone Echo, Half-Life: Alyx, Lone Echo II, and Red Matter 2 won both immersive reality categories.

== Winners and nominees ==
Table key
Indicates the winner

=== 2010s ===
Year	Game	Developer(s)	Publisher(s)	Ref.
2016 (20th)	Superhot VR	Team Superhot	Team Superhot	
2016 (20th)	Eagle Flight	Ubisoft Montreal	Ubisoft	
2016 (20th)	I Expect You to Die	Schell Games	Schell Games	
2016 (20th)	Job Simulator	Owlchemy Labs	Owlchemy Labs	
2016 (20th)	The Lab	Valve	Valve	
2017 (21st)	Lone Echo	Ready at Dawn	Oculus Studios	
2017 (21st)	Psychonauts in the Rhombus of Ruin	Double Fine Productions	Double Fine Productions	
2017 (21st)	Robo Recall	Epic Games	Epic Games	
2017 (21st)	Space Pirate Trainer	I-Illusions	I-Illusions	
2017 (21st)	Wilson's Heart	Twisted Pixel Games	Oculus Studios	
2018 (22nd)	Beat Saber	Beat Games	Beat Games	
2018 (22nd)	Astro Bot Rescue Mission	Japan Studio	Sony Interactive Entertainment	
2018 (22nd)	Moss	Polyarc	Polyarc	
2018 (22nd)	Sprint Vector	Survios	Survios	
2018 (22nd)	Transference	SpectreVision, Ubisoft Montreal	Ubisoft	
2019 (23rd)	Pistol Whip	Cloudhead Games	Cloudhead Games	
2019 (23rd)	Asgard's Wrath	Sanzaru Games	Oculus Studios	
2019 (23rd)	Blood & Truth	London Studio	Sony Interactive Entertainment	
2019 (23rd)	The Curious Tale of the Stolen Pets	Fast Travel Games	Fast Travel Games	
2019 (23rd)	Trover Saves the Universe	Squanch Games	Squanch Games	

=== 2020s ===
Year	Game	Developer(s)	Publisher(s)	Ref.
2020 (24th)	Half-Life: Alyx	Valve	Valve	
2020 (24th)	Down the Rabbit Hole	Cortopia Studios	Cortopia Studios	
2020 (24th)	Paper Beast	Pixel Reef	Pixel Reef	
2020 (24th)	The Room VR: A Dark Matter	Fireproof Games	Fireproof Games	
2020 (24th)	The Walking Dead: Saints & Sinners	Skydance Interactive	Skydance Interactive	
2021 (25th)	Lone Echo II	Ready at Dawn	Oculus Studios	
2021 (25th)	Demeo	Resolution Games	Resolution Games	
2021 (25th)	I Expect You to Die 2: The Spy and the Liar	Schell Games	Schell Games	
2021 (25th)	Resident Evil 4 VR	Armature Studio	Oculus Studios	
2021 (25th)	Song in the Smoke	17-Bit	17-Bit	
2022 (26th)	Red Matter 2	Vertical Robot	Vertical Robot	
2022 (26th)	Cosmonious High	Owlchemy Labs	Owlchemy Labs	
2022 (26th)	Moss: Book II	Polyarc	Polyarc	
2022 (26th)	Tentacular	Firepunchd Games	Devolver Digital	
2022 (26th)	The Last Clockwinder	Pontobo	Cyan Worlds	
2023 (27th)	Asgard's Wrath 2	Sanzaru Games	Oculus Studios	
2023 (27th)	Assassin's Creed Nexus VR	Red Storm Entertainment	Ubisoft	
2023 (27th)	Horizon Call of the Mountain	Guerrilla Games, Firesprite	Sony Interactive Entertainment	
2023 (27th)	Vampire: The Masquerade - Justice	Fast Travel Games	Fast Travel Games	
2023 (27th)	Vertigo 2	Zulubo Productions	Zulubo Productions	
2024 (28th)	Batman: Arkham Shadow	Camouflaj	Oculus Studios	
2024 (28th)	Alien: Rogue Incursion	Survios	20th Century Games	
2024 (28th)	Escaping Wonderland	Cortopia Studio	Beyond Frames Entertainment	
2024 (28th)	Skydance's Behemoth	Skydance Games	Skydance Games	
2024 (28th)	Underdogs	One Hamsa	One Hamsa	
2025 (29th)	Ghost Town	Fireproof Games	Fireproof Games	
2025 (29th)	Demeo x Dungeons & Dragons: Battlemarked	Resolution Games	Resolution Games	
2025 (29th)	Marvel's Deadpool VR	Twisted Pixel Games	Oculus Studios	
2025 (29th)	The Midnight Walk	MoonHood	Fast Travel Games	
2025 (29th)	Thief VR: Legacy of Shadow	Maze Theory	Vertigo Games	

== Multiple nominations and wins ==
=== Developers and publishers ===
Oculus Studios, now known as Reality Labs, has published the most nominees and the only publisher with multiple wins. Ready at Dawn is the only developer to have developed multiple winners.

Developers
Developer	Nominations	Wins
Ready at Dawn	2	2
Fireproof Games	2	1
Sanzaru Games	2	1
Valve	2	1
Fast Travel Games	2	0
Owlchemy Labs	2	0
Polyarc	2	0
Resolution Games	2	0
Schell Games	2	0
Skydance	2	0
Survios	2	0
Twisted Pixel Games	2	0
Ubisoft Montreal	2	0

Publishers
Publisher	Nominations	Wins
Oculus Studios	8	4
Fireproof Games	2	1
Valve	2	1
Fast Travel Games	3	0
Sony Computer/Interactive Entertainment	3	0
Ubisoft	3	0
Owlchemy Labs	2	0
Polyarc	2	0
Resolution Games	2	0
Schell Games	2	0
Skydance	2	0

=== Franchises ===
Lone Echo is the only franchise to have won more than once.

Franchises
Franchise	Nominations	Wins
Lone Echo	2	2
Asgard's Wrath	2	1
Demeo	2	0
I Expect You to Die	2	0
Moss	2	0
