= 20th Annual D.I.C.E. Awards =

Video game award ceremony

- Date: February 23, 2017
- Venue: Mandalay Bay Convention Center
- Country: Paradise, Nevada, USA
- Hosted by: Jessica Chobot and Greg Miller

Highlights
- Most awards: Overwatch; Uncharted 4: A Thief's End (4)
- Most nominations: Uncharted 4: A Thief's End (10)
- Game of the Year: Overwatch
- Hall of Fame: Todd Howard

The 20th Annual D.I.C.E. Awards was the 20th edition of the D.I.C.E. Awards, an annual awards event that honored the best games in the video game industry during 2016. The awards were arranged by the Academy of Interactive Arts & Sciences (AIAS), and were held at the Mandalay Bay Convention Center in Paradise, Nevada on February 23, 2017. It was also held as part of the academy's 2017 D.I.C.E. Summit, and was co-hosted by Jessica Chobot of Nerdist News, and Kinda Funny co-founder Greg Miller.

The academy introduced the categories for "Immersive Reality Game of the Year" and "Immersive Reality Technical Achievement" as Game of the Year awards.

Overwatch won "Game of the Year", and tied for winning the most awards with Uncharted 4: A Thief's End, which received the most nominations. Sony Interactive Entertainment was the most nominated and award-winning publisher and had the most award-winning games. Sony was tied with Electronic Arts and Nintendo for having the most nominated games. Pokémon won both "Handheld Game of the Year" and "Mobile Game of the Year", with Pokémon Sun and Moon and Pokémon Go, respectively.

Todd Howard, lead director and executive producer for The Elder Scrolls and Fallout franchises at Bethesda Game Studios, was inducted into the academy's Hall of Fame.

== Winners and Nominees ==
Winners are listed first, highlighted in boldface, and indicated with a double dagger (‡).

=== Game of the Year awards ===
**Game of the Year**: **Overwatch** — **Blizzard Entertainment**‡; Battlefield 1 — DICE, Electronic Arts; Inside — Playdead; Pokémon Go — Niantic; Uncharted 4: A Thief's End — Naughty Dog, Sony Interactive Entertainment
**Outstanding Achievement in Online Gameplay**: **Overwatch** — **Blizzard Entertainment**‡; Battlefield 1 — DICE, Electronic Arts; Hearthstone: Heroes of Warcraft — Blizzard Entertainment; Titanfall 2 — Respawn Entertainment, Electronic Arts; Tom Clancy's The Division — Massive Entertainment, Ubisoft	**D.I.C.E. Sprite Award**: **Inside** — **Playdead**‡; 1979 Revolution: Black Friday — iNK Stories; Firewatch — Campo Santo; Superhot — Superhot Team; That Dragon, Cancer — Numinous Games
**Handheld Game of the Year**: **Pokémon Sun and Moon** — **Game Freak**, **Nintendo**, **The Pokémon Company**‡; Dragon Quest Builders — Square Enix; Fire Emblem Fates — Intelligent Systems, Nintendo; Kirby: Planet Robobot — HAL Laboratory, Nintendo; Severed — Drinkbox Studios	**Mobile Game of the Year**: **Pokémon Go** — **Niantic**‡; Clash Royale — Supercell; Crashlands — Butterscotch Shenanigans; Gardenscapes: New Acres — Playrix; Reigns — Nerial, Devolver Digital

=== Immersive Reality awards ===
**Immersive Reality Game of the Year**: **Superhot VR** — **Superhot Team**‡; Eagle Flight — Ubisoft Montreal; I Expect You To Die — Schell Games; Job Simulator — Owlchemy Labs; The Lab — Valve	**Immersive Reality Technical Achievement**: **Eagle Flight** — **Ubisoft Montreal**‡; I Expect You To Die — Schell Games; Job Simulator — Owlchemy Labs; Superhot VR — Superhot Team; Tilt Brush — Google

=== Craft awards ===
**Outstanding Achievement in Game Direction**: **Inside** — **Playdead**‡; 1979 Revolution: Black Friday — iNK Stories; Battlefield 1 — DICE, Electronic Arts; The Last Guardian — SIE Japan Studio, GenDesign; Uncharted 4: A Thief's End — Naughty Dog, Sony Interactive Entertainment	**Outstanding Achievement in Game Design**: **Overwatch** — **Blizzard Entertainment**‡; I Expect You to Die — Schell Games; Inside — Playdead; Owlboy — D-Pad Studio; Uncharted 4: A Thief's End — Naughty Dog, Sony Interactive Entertainment
**Outstanding Achievement in Animation**: **Uncharted 4: A Thief's End** — **Naughty Dog**, **Sony Interactive Entertainment**‡; Inside — Playdead; The Last Guardian — SIE Japan Studio, GenDesign; Overwatch — Blizzard Entertainment; Street Fighter V — Capcom, Dimps	**Outstanding Achievement in Art Direction**: **Inside** — **Playdead**‡; Battlefield 1 — DICE, Electronic Arts; Firewatch — Campo Santo; The Last Guardian — SIE Japan Studio, GenDesign; Uncharted 4: A Thief's End — Naughty Dog, Sony Interactive Entertainment
**Outstanding Achievement in Character**: **Trico** **(The Last Guardian)** — **SIE Japan Studio**, **GenDesign**‡; Nick Reyes (Call of Duty: Infinite Warfare) — Infinity Ward, Activision; Delilah (Firewatch) — Campo Santo; Henry (Firewatch) — Campo Santo; Nathan Drake (Uncharted 4: A Thief's End) — Naughty Dog, Sony Interactive Entertainment	**Outstanding Achievement in Original Music Composition**: **Doom** — **id Software**, **Bethesda Softworks**‡; Abzû — Giant Squid Studios, 505 Games; Battlefield 1 — DICE, Electronic Arts; The Last Guardian — SIE Japan Studio, GenDesign; Titanfall 2 — Respawn Entertainment, Electronic Arts
**Outstanding Achievement in Sound Design**: **Battlefield 1** — **DICE**, **Electronic Arts**‡; Inside — Playdead; The Last Guardian — SIE Japan Studio, GenDesign; Quantum Break — Remedy Entertainment, Microsoft Studios; Uncharted 4: A Thief's End — Naughty Dog, Sony Interactive Entertainment	**Outstanding Achievement in Story**: **Uncharted 4: A Thief's End** — **Naughty Dog**, **Sony Interactive Entertainment**‡; Firewatch — Campo Santo; Inside — Playdead; Oxenfree — Night School Studio; That Dragon, Cancer — Numinous Games
**Outstanding Technical Achievement**: **Uncharted 4: A Thief's End** — **Naughty Dog**, **Sony Interactive Entertainment**‡; Battlefield 1 — DICE, Electronic Arts; No Man's Sky — Hello Games; Overwatch — Blizzard Entertainment; Titanfall 2 — Respawn Entertainment, Electronic Arts

=== Genre awards ===
**Action Game of the Year**: **Overwatch** — **Blizzard Entertainment**‡; Battlefield 1 — DICE, Electronic Arts; Doom — id Software, Bethesda Game Studios; Gears of War 4 — The Coalition, Microsoft Studios; Titanfall 2 — Respawn Entertainment, Electronic Arts	**Adventure Game of the Year**: **Uncharted 4: A Thief's End** — **Naughty Dog**, **Sony Interactive Entertainment**‡; Firewatch — Campo Santo; Inside — Playdead; King's Quest: Complete Collection — The Odd Gentlemen, Activision; The Last Guardian — SIE Japan Studio, GenDesign
**Family Game of the Year**: **Ratchet & Clank** — **Insomniac Games**, **Sony Interactive Entertainment**‡; Dragon Quest Builders — Square Enix; Lego Star Wars: The Force Awakens — Traveller's Tales, Warner Bros. Interactive Entertainment; Rock Band Rivals — Harmonix; Super Mario Maker for Nintendo 3DS — Nintendo EAD	**Fighting Game of the Year**: **Street Fighter V** — **Capcom**, **Dimps**‡; EA Sports UFC 2 — EA Canada; Guilty Gear Xrd -REVELATOR- — Arc System Works, Aksys Games; Killer Instinct: Season Three — Iron Galaxy, Microsoft Studios; Pokkén Tournament — Bandai Namco Studios, Nintendo, The Pokémon Company
**Racing Game of the Year**: **Forza Horizon 3** — **Playground Games**, **Microsoft Studios**‡; Driveclub VR — Evolution Studios, Sony Interactive Entertainment	**Role-Playing/Massively Multiplayer Game of the Year**: **Dark Souls III** — **FromSoftware**, **Bandai Namco Entertainment**‡; Deus Ex: Mankind Divided — Square Enix Montreal; Hyper Light Drifter — Heart Machine; Tom Clancy's The Division — Massive Entertainment, Ubisoft; World of Warcraft: Legion — Blizzard Entertainment
**Sports Game of the Year**: **Steep** — **Ubisoft Annecy**‡; FIFA 17 — EA Vancouver, EA Romania; Madden NFL 17 — EA Tiburon; MLB 16: The Show — SCE San Diego; NBA 2K17 — Visual Concepts, 2K Games	**Strategy/Simulation Game of the Year**: **Civilization VI** — **Firaxis Games**, **2K Games**‡; The Banner Saga 2 — Stoic, Versus Evil; Deus Ex Go — Square Enix Montreal; Fire Emblem Fates — Intelligent Systems, Nintendo; XCOM 2 — Firaxis Games, 2K Games

=== Special awards ===
==== Hall of Fame ====
- Todd Howard

=== Multiple nominations and awards ===
==== Multiple Nominations ====
Games that received multiple nominations
Nominations	Game
10	Uncharted 4: A Thief's End
9	Inside
8	Battlefield 1
7	The Last Guardian
6	Firewatch
6	Overwatch
4	Titanfall 2
3	I Expect You to Die
3	Superhot (Note: Includes Superhot VR.)
2	1979 Revolution: Black Friday
2	Doom
2	Dragon Quest Builders
2	Eagle Flight
2	Fire Emblem Fates
2	Job Simulator
2	Pokémon Go
2	Street Fighter V
2	That Dragon, Cancer
2	Tom Clancy's The Division

Nominations by company
Nominations	Games	Company
20	5	Sony Interactive Entertainment
15	5	Electronic Arts
10	1	Naughty Dog
9	1	Playdead
8	3	Blizzard Entertainment
8	1	DICE
7	1	GenDesign
6	5	Nintendo
6	1	Campo Santo
5	3	Ubisoft
4	4	Microsoft Studios
4	3	Square Enix
4	1	Respawn Entertainment
3	3	2K Games
3	1	Schell Games
3	1	Superhot Team
2	2	Activision
2	2	Bandai Namco Entertainment
2	2	Firaxis Games
2	1	Bethesda Softworks
2	1	Capcom
2	1	Dimps
2	1	id Software
2	1	iNK Stories
2	1	Intelligent Systems
2	1	Massive Entertainment
2	1	Niantic
2	1	Numinous Games
2	1	Owlchemy Labs
2	1	The Pokémon Company

==== Multiple awards ====
Games that received multiple awards
Awards	Game
4	Overwatch
4	Uncharted 4: A Thief's End
3	Inside

Awards by company
Awards	Games	Company
6	3	Sony Interactive Entertainment
4	1	Blizzard Entertainment
4	1	Naughty Dog
3	1	Playdead
2	2	Ubisoft
2	2	The Pokémon Company
