= Tentacular (video game) =

2022 video game

- Developer: Firepunchd Games
- Publisher: Devolver Digital
- Engine: Unity
- Platforms: Windows; PlayStation 5
- Release: Windows; 24 March 2022; PlayStation VR2; 22 February 2023
- Genres: Action-adventure, puzzle
- Mode: Single-player

Tentacular is a 2022 virtual reality action-adventure video game developed by German studio Firepunchd Games and published by Devolver Digital. The game was released for Windows via Meta Quest 2 and SteamVR on 24 March 2022, and released for the PlayStation 5 as a launch title for the PlayStation VR2 on February 22, 2023.

== Gameplay ==
Tentacular is a physics-based adventure game where the player takes on the role of a gigantic but good-hearted tentacled beast in the waters of La Kalma, tasked with helping the islands citizens research a strange and powerful energy source.

There are 50 puzzle and action levels in which the player will need to use their tentacles to build large contraptions, structures, and taxi the citizens around La Kalma. The game also features a creative sandbox mode where the player has the freedom to explore and interact with the island.

== Development ==
Tentacular was officially announced via Twitter by Devolver Digital on 11 February 2022, with a release date of Q2 2022, with Firepunchd initially teasing the game in 2020.

Firepunchd, also known as Simon Cubasch, is a game developer based in Berlin, Germany. He founded the digital agency "GoSub Communications" in 1998 which was acquired by Edelman in 2011. In his time with GoSub, Cubasch created over 20 games varying from 3D TV games, augmented reality applications, and mobile games.

== Reception ==
During the 26th Annual D.I.C.E. Awards, the Academy of Interactive Arts & Sciences nominated Tentacular for Immersive Reality Game of the Year.
