= Agnieszka Domańska =

Polish ice dancer

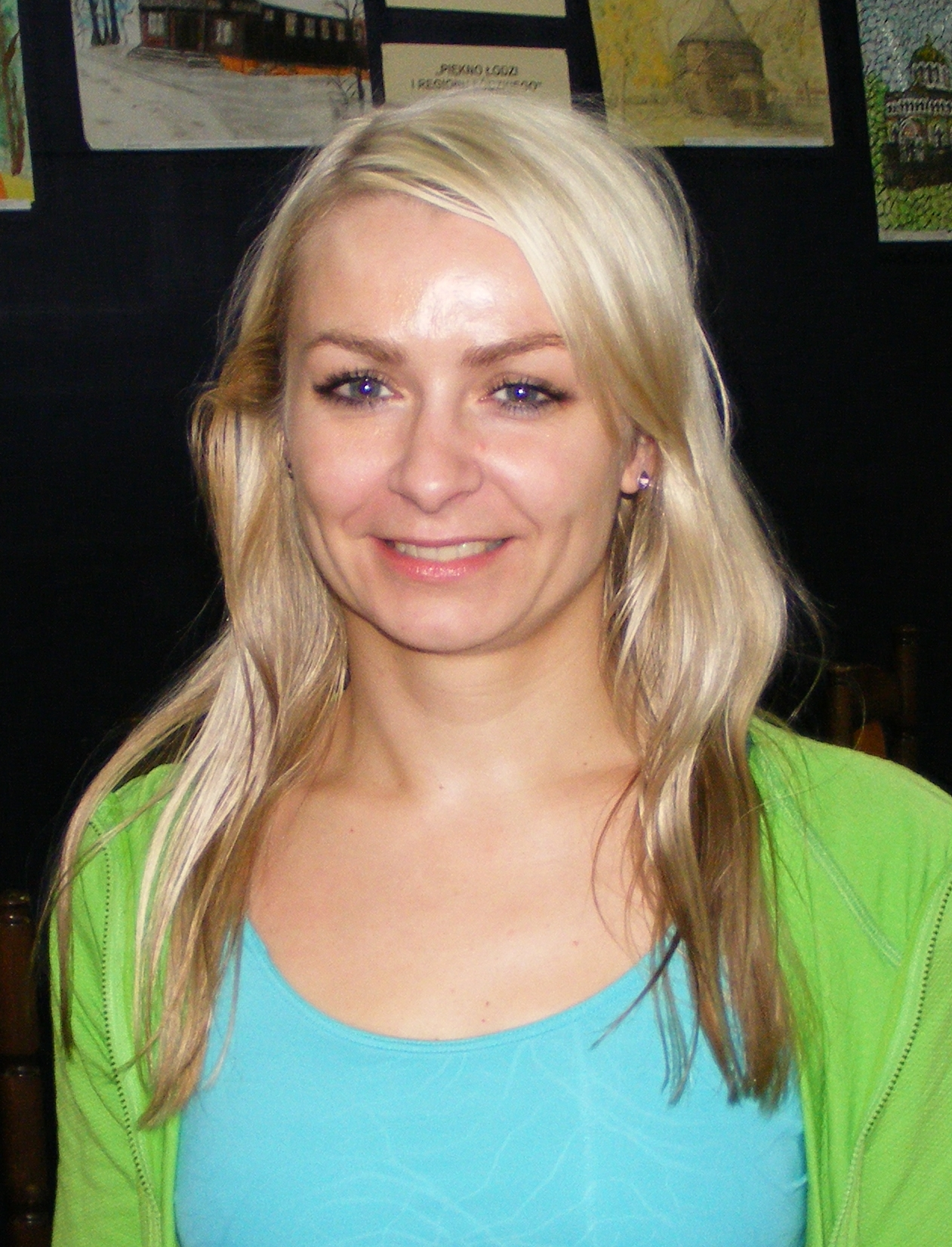
- Portrait of Agnieszka Domańska in 2010

Personal information
- Born: 8 March 1975 (age 51) Łódź, Poland
- Height: 1.60 m (5 ft 3 in)

Figure skating career
- Country: Poland
- Retired: 1995

Agnieszka Domańska (born 8 March 1975 in Łódź) is a Polish former ice dancer. She and partner Marcin Głowacki trained in Łódź, coached by Maria Olszewska-Lelonkiewicz.

Domańska / Głowacki placed 12th at the World Junior Figure Skating Championships in 1991, 20th and 21st at the World Figure Skating Championships in 1992 and 1993, respectively, and 19th, 14th, 15th at the European Figure Skating Championships in 1992, 1993 and 1994, respectively. They also skated at the 1994 Olympic Games, where they placed 17th.

Earlier in her career, Domańska was a Polish national junior champion with Sebastian Kolasiński.

== Results ==
(ice dance with Marcin Głowacki)

Results
International
Event	1990–91	1991–92	1992–93	1993–94	1994–95
Winter Olympic Games				17th	
World Championships		20th	21st		
European Championships		19th	14th	15th	
Skate Canada International		10th			
Trophée de France				6th	6th
Karl Schäfer Memorial				1st	
International: Junior
World Junior Championships	12th				
National
Polish Championships		1st	1st	1st	
