= Crashlands =

2016 action-adventure video game

- Developer: Butterscotch Shenanigans
- Publisher: Butterscotch Shenanigans
- Designer: Sam Coster
- Programmer: Adam Coster
- Composer: Fat Bard
- Engine: GameMaker Studio
- Platforms: Android, iOS, Microsoft Windows, OS X, Linux, Nintendo Switch, Xbox One
- Release: January 21, 2016; Nintendo Switch; November 8, 2018; Xbox One; January 29, 2021
- Genres: Action-adventure, survival
- Modes: Single-player, multiplayer

Crashlands is an action-adventure video game developed and published by Butterscotch Shenanigans. It was released on the App Store, Google Play and Steam in January 2016. The game is described as being a "story-driven crafting game" and tasks players to collect resources in order to craft items such as weapons and armor.

== Gameplay ==
Crashlands is an action-adventure survival video game similar in style in that of Don't Starve. The player character explores an open world and collects resources in order to craft weapons, armor as well as constructing bases. Unlike its inspiration, the character does not require sustenance and combat is an integral part of gameplay, with mild role-playing elements dictating the player's survivability; armor and weapons can provide different status effects as well as attack/defense increases to benefit the player.

The game is more narrative-focused than its peers; aside from the main objective, players can partake in side quests to receive rewards or advance the story in minor ways.

== Plot ==
While fulfilling an intergalactic delivery for the Bureau of Shipping, Flux Dabes and her robotic partner JuiceBox are stopped by an alien named Hewgodooko. He explains that he is looking for a "Quantum Electrodongle", and upon learning that there is one installed on the ship, decides to destroy their ship. Flux and JuiceBox collect their packages before getting into the escape pod.

They crash land in The Savanna of the planet Woanope. JuiceBox suggests Flux builds an advanced Comm Device to contact the Bureau of Shipping for help.

== Development ==
Development for Crashlands went underway after Sam Coster, one of the developers at Butterscotch Shenanigans, was diagnosed with stage 4b lymphoma. At the time, Butterscotch Shenanigans had largely been known for developing smaller titles, so Coster and his brother decided to use this as an opportunity to develop something much more ambitious.

== Reception ==
Reception

Aggregate score
Aggregator	Score
Metacritic	iOS: 93/100; PC: 78/100; NS: 75/100

Review score
Publication	Score
TouchArcade	5/5

The mobile and PC versions of the game hold aggregated scores of 93 out of 100 and 78 out of 100 on Metacritic, respectively. PC Gamer awarded it 73%, saying "Fun combat, great writing, and a great look, but with pacing and progression tuned for a mobile experience, not the PC."

During the 20th Annual D.I.C.E. Awards, the Academy of Interactive Arts & Sciences nominated Crashlands for "Mobile Game of the Year".

== Sequel ==
In June 2023, Butterscotch Shenanigans announced a sequel titled Crashlands 2. The game was released on April 10, 2025.
