= Space Pirate Trainer =

- Developer: I-Illusions
- Publisher: I-Illusions
- Engine: Unity
- Platforms: Microsoft Windows, Oculus Quest, PlayStation 4
- Release: Windows; October 12, 2017; PlayStation 4; November 26, 2018; Oculus Quest; May 21, 2019
- Genre: Action game
- Mode: Single-player

Space Pirate Trainer is a virtual reality (VR) first-person shooter developed and published by I-Illusions. It was one of the earliest wave shooters utilizing the VR game-play environment. The game was released alongside the HTC Vive and featured in VR arcades. In 2018, it was also released digitally through the PlayStation Store.

== Gameplay ==
The game places the player on a platform in space while waves of robots come down and attack. The player has a choice between a pistol, shotgun, laser, machine gun, grenade launcher and laser sword to fight off the robots. Players can physically move within the play area to dodge incoming fire from the robots.

== Development ==
The game was developed by Dirk Van Welden, with the team drawing inspiration from 1980s arcade games such as Space Invaders and Galaga. Welden was skeptical of developing a game for VR since in past experiences he had experienced severe nausea using the platform. Once motion tracking had improved Welden developed a demo for a game and posted on a forum. He was then contacted by Valve and told that he should work on a fully-fledged game. The game left early access with its 1.0 release on October 12, 2017. The update introduced additional enemy waves, a boss encounter, turrets, power-ups and checkpoints.

In 2021, Space Pirate Trainer DX introduced an Arena multiplayer mode designed for a 10 by 10 metre physical play area. The mode uses players' physical movement through the space rather than artificial locomotion.

== Reception ==
Space Pirate Trainer received "mixed or average reviews" from critics according to Metacritic. During the 21st Annual D.I.C.E. Awards, the Academy of Interactive Arts & Sciences nominated Space Pirate Trainer for "Immersive Reality Game of the Year.

Reception

Aggregate score
Aggregator	Score
Metacritic	74/100

Review score
Publication	Score
UploadVR	7.5/10
