= Puddles Pity Party =

American singer and entertainer

Mike Geier
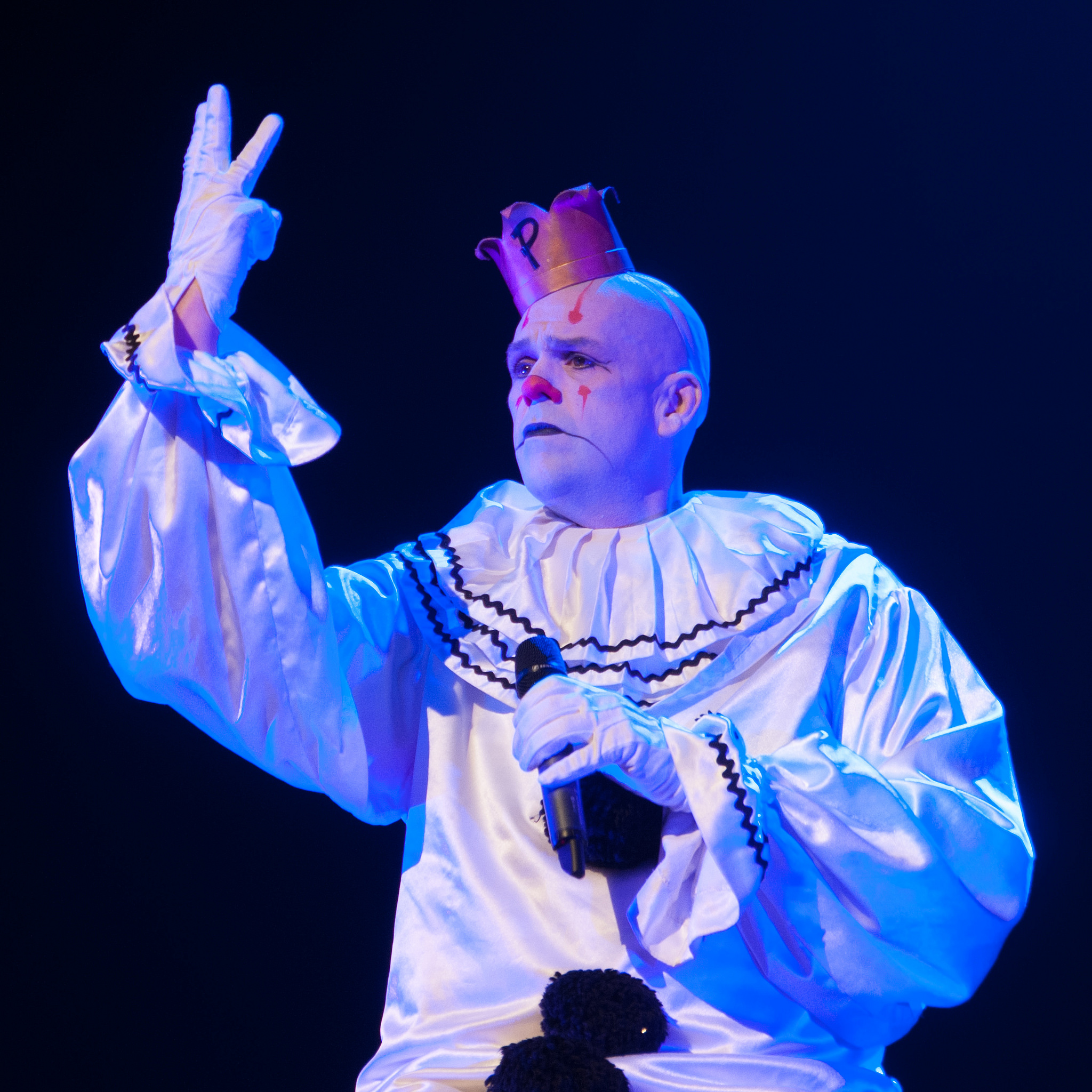
- Geier performing as Puddles in 2014
- Born: March 12, 1965 (age 61); Philadelphia, Pennsylvania, U.S.
- Other name: Puddles Pity Party (performer)
- Occupations: Singer, performance artist
- Years active: 1990s–present
- Height: 6 ft 8 in (2.03 m)
- Musical career
- Genre: Cabaret
- Instruments: Voice, piano, guitar, drums, ukelele
- Member of: Puddles Pity Party
- Formerly of: Postmodern Jukebox, Useless Playboys, Kingsized, Tongo Hiti
- Website: puddlespityparty.com

Michael Geier is an American singer and entertainer based in Atlanta, Georgia, U.S. Geier is best known for his persona of Puddles Pity Party, a pierrot whiteface clown in the vein of Pagliacci who sings covers of popular music. Geier traditionally refers to Puddles in third person when speaking about the character.

== Early life ==
Geier was born in Philadelphia, Pennsylvania, United States, the fifth of seven children of "Big Oz" and Peg Geier. He says that he "grew up in a houseful of giants", with his two brothers and four sisters all growing to at least 6 ft 0 in (1.83 m) in height. Geier is 6 ft 8 in (2.03 m) tall. He grew up in Richmond, Virginia.

== Career ==
Geier, known as Big Mike Geier, fronted the band Useless Playboys in Richmond. He moved to Atlanta in 1995 and formed the band Kingsized soon after. The band performed swing, rock, and soul covers. Other entertainment projects he founded in Atlanta included Dames Aflame, a burlesque revue that became a part of Kingsized shows. Elvis Royale is an Elvis Presley tribute act fronted by Geier with Kingsized as the band; Geier continues to make occasional appearances with that act. Other projects were Bogey and the Viceroy, the Kingsized Jazz Trio, and Tongo Hiti. He originated the Puddles character in the band Greasepaint.

=== Puddles Pity Party ===
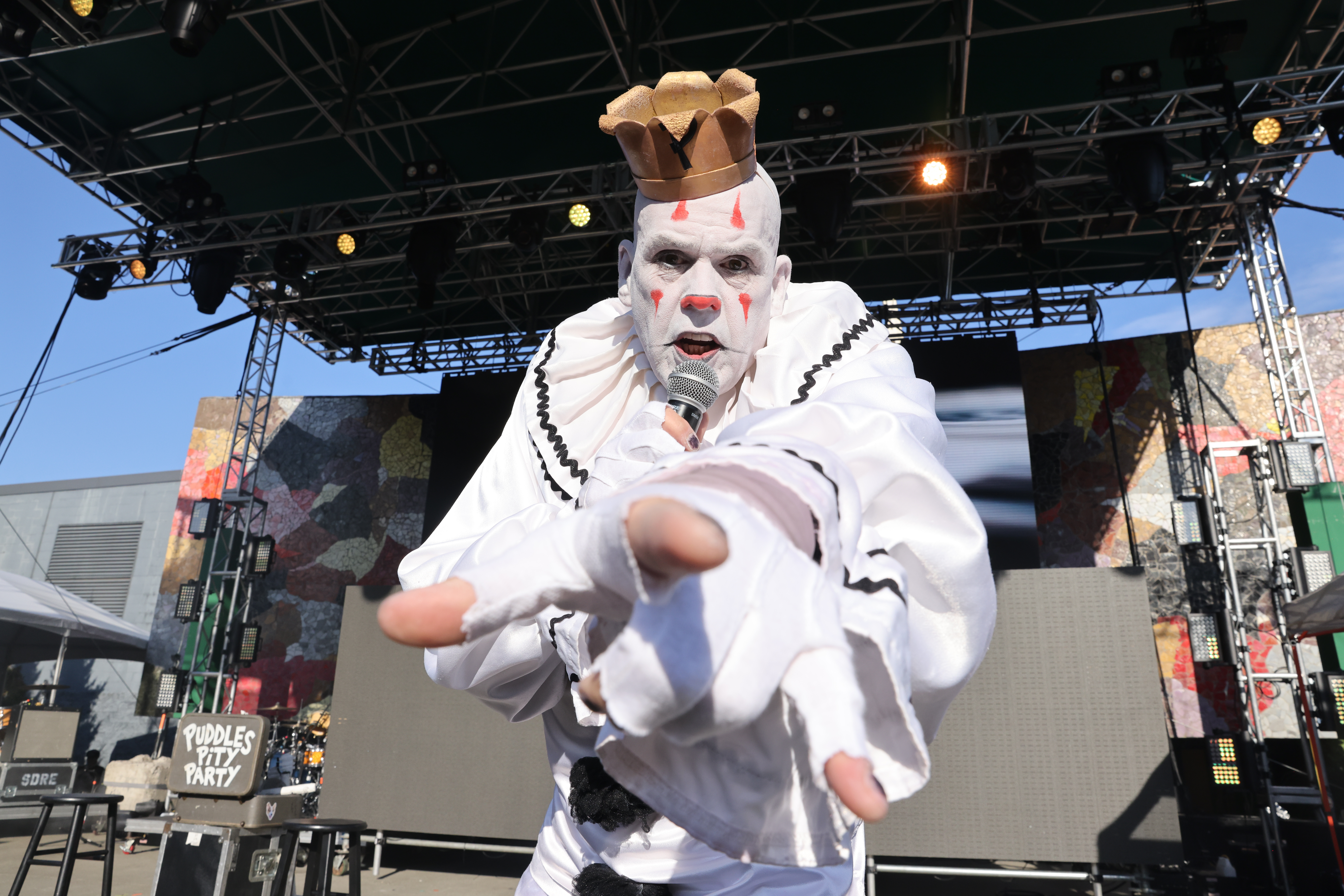
Puddles Pity Party at Bumbershoot in Seattle in 2023

==== 1990s ====
In 1998, Geier decided to found a clown-themed band with several other Atlanta-based musicians, developing the name and persona of Puddles as his contribution. The group eventually broke up, but laid the foundation for Puddles Pity Party as a solo project. Puddles' original appearance was mostly nonspecific, but eventually developed into donning a whiteface clown costume. Geier refers to Puddles in third person while speaking about the character, and will also refer to himself as Mike in third person while performing as Puddles. Like Geier himself, Puddles has a baritone singing voice, and sings mostly covers of songs. Puddles has a depressed persona and refrains from speaking on stage or giving interviews. His shows include a mix of silent prop comedy, mime, and audience participation with songs interplayed throughout creating a narrative structure. Puddles Pity Party's first performance as an independent act was an experiment for Aqua Teen Hunger Force's 2010 tour. Initially skeptical if his singing clown character would be well-received, Geier stated that his wife convinced him to continue with the act after his premiere performance garnered an overwhelmingly positive response from the audience.

==== 2010s ====
In 2011, Geier appeared regularly at the Manderley Bar in New York's immersive theater show Sleep No More. In 2012, he moved to Seattle to appear in a European-style vaudevillian cabaret, Teatro ZinZanni. In 2013, he opened for Eels during their U.S. and European tour.

Since 2014, Geier has toured the world, playing concerts in the United States, United Kingdom, Belgium, and Australia.

In 2017, Geier, as Puddles, participated in season 12 of the reality series America's Got Talent. He advanced to the quarterfinals at the Dolby Theatre, where he performed his version of "Royals" and received an "X" from Simon Cowell. He was ultimately eliminated the following night. In October 2017 Geier, as Puddles, made an appearance in a Cartoon Network ad promoting new episodes of Teen Titans Go! and OK K.O.! Let's Be Heroes. Geier previously collaborated with Cartoon Network's Sunday Pants series writing music for the show as well as playing the Slacks' band leader in the live action segments.

In January 2019 Geier, as Puddles, began a headline act residency at Caesars Palace, Las Vegas, Nevada.

==== 2020s ====
In 2022, Geier, as Puddles, made a guest appearance on the season 4 season finale of The Conners.

In April 2024, he performed with A Perfect Circle, singing the song The Hollow, as part of Maynard James Keenan's Sessanta tour.

In August 2024, Puddles toured as an opening act for nine dates with Primus and Coheed and Cambria, and at some shows joined Primus onstage as a guest to sing Holy Diver by Dio.

In September 2024, it was announced that Puddles would be touring as a special guest with "Weird Al" Yankovic on his "Bigger & Weirder 2025 Tour". He appeared again on Yankovic's 2026 tour of the same name.

On April 1, 2026, Puddles made a surprise appearance at the Durham Performing Arts Center in Durham, North Carolina, during the penultimate song of Puscifer's set on their Normal Isn't tour. He was accompanied by opening act comic, Dave Hill, on guitar. They covered Van Halen's Ain't Talkin' 'Bout Love backed by Puscifer. Despite the strict "no phones" policy that Puscifer enforces at their concerts, frontman Maynard James Keenan permitted the audience to record the event in order to "document" it. Typically, only the final song of the set is permitted to be photographed.

== Discography ==
=== With Postmodern Jukebox ===
- 2014: Clubbin' with Grandpa, Scott Bradlee's Postmodern Jukebox, "Chandelier"
- 2015: Top Hat on Fleek, Scott Bradlee's Postmodern Jukebox: "Mad World" and "Viva la Vida"
- 2016: The Essentials, Scott Bradlee's Postmodern Jukebox: "Royals"
- 2016: Squad Goals, Scott Bradlee's Postmodern Jukebox, "Stressed Out"
- 2017: Fake Blues, Scott Bradlee's Postmodern Jukebox: "All the Small Things"

=== As Puddles Pity Party ===
Albums

- Live at Joe's Pub (Puddles Pity Party self-released), 2015
- Holiday Jubilee (Puddles Pity Party self-released), 2018
- You Down? (Puddles Pity Party self-released), 2018
- Unhappy Hour at the Loner's Lounge (Puddles Pity Party self-released), 2020
- Songs That Got Me Through the Plague (Puddles Pity Party self-released), 2021
- America Today (Puddles Pity Party self-released), 2026

Singles & EPs

- "Royals" (Postmodern Jukebox, featuring Puddles Pity Party), 2014
- "The Shadow of Your Smile", Insect Queen Music, 2015
- "Space Oddity/Life on Mars", Sympathy for the Record Industry, 2019
- "The Spy and the Liar" (Puddles Pity Party self-released), 2021

=== With Tongo Hiti ===
Albums

- 2006: Honi Ko'u Ule
