= Maria Olszewska-Lelonkiewicz =

Polish figure skating coach

Maria Olszewska-Lelonkiewicz (2 November 1939 in Łódź – 6 March 2007 in Łódź) was a Polish figure skating coach.

Ice dancers she coached included Sylwia Nowak & Sebastian Kolasiński, Agnieszka Domańska & Marcin Głowacki and Aleksandra Kauc & Michał Zych. As a young girl she competed in rhythmic gymnastics, placing 2nd in the Polish Junior National Championships. She also played handball.
