= I Expect You to Die =

2016 video game

I Expect You To Die
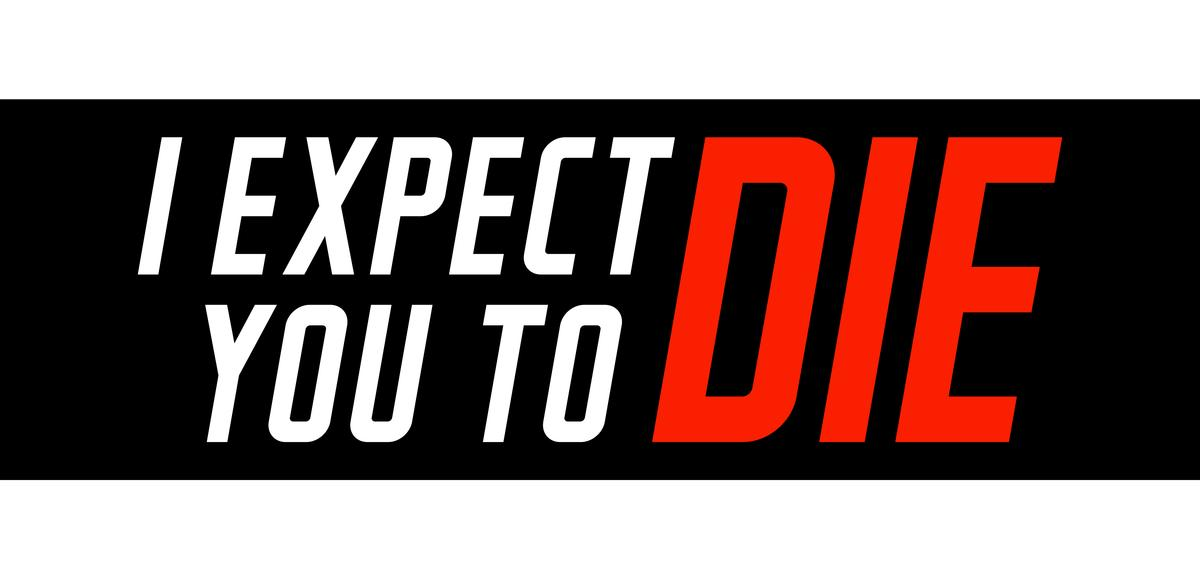
- Developer: Schell Games
- Publisher: Schell Games
- Platforms: Oculus Rift; PlayStation 4; Windows; Meta Quest
- Release: Oculus Rift; 6 December 2016; PlayStation 4; 13 December 2016; Windows; 25 April 2017; Oculus Quest; 21 May 2019
- Genres: Action, Espionage
- Mode: Single-player

I Expect You to Die is a virtual reality (VR) action video game developed and published by Schell Games and released in December 2016 for PlayStation 4, and April 2017 for Windows. In the game, the player assumes the role of a "James Bond-esque" spy and is tasked to complete levels. The game can be played using the Oculus Rift, Oculus Rift S, HTC Vive, PlayStation VR, and on the Meta Quest (formerly Oculus) series of headsets.

A sequel, I Expect You to Die 2: The Spy and the Liar, was released in August 2021. Another sequel, I Expect You To Die 3: Cog in the Machine, was released in August 2023.

== Gameplay ==
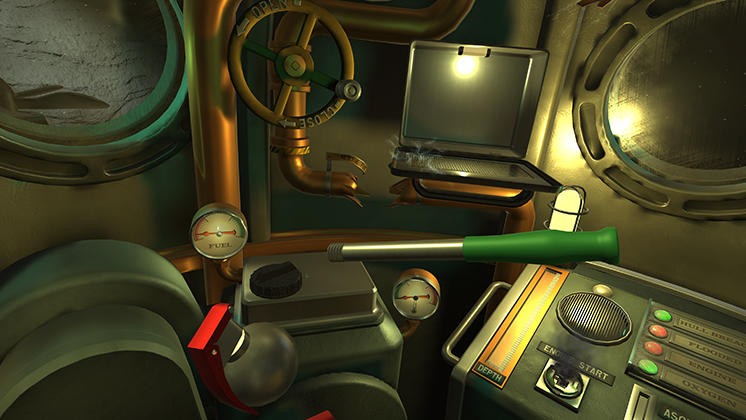
In I Expect You to Die, the player must use their surroundings to solve puzzles.

I Expect You to Die is a virtual reality game in which the player must solve puzzle scenarios, ranging from breaking out of an aeroplane in a car to surfacing an underwater escape pod. Most events are timed and require quick thinking in order to continue. Objects are hidden in the surrounding environment seemingly at random, but have a specific purpose the player must figure out in order to solve the puzzle and succeed.

== Synopsis ==
The game follows a spy who works for "The Agency", a secret organization that protects the world. The spy has just begun working and has been given a telekinetic implant that allows them to make objects float. In the spy's first mission, their assistant Support Agent reveals that a billionaire super-villain named Dr. Zor, head of the evil organization "Zoraxis", has a cargo plane, scheduled to fly to Zanzibar, that contains a high-tech car. The spy gets into the car and activates a defense system that allows them to drive off the plane.

In their next mission, the spy discovers that Zor has had his lieutenant, Daniel Sans, working on a 'super-virus' to get revenge on The Agency. The spy goes undercover and breaks open the lab window. They then use a machine and a note from a rogue scientist to build a cure. Though it seems too late when the rocket carrying the super-virus is launched, the spy breaks open the rocket and combines it with the cure, saving the city.

In the next mission, the spy is tasked with destroying Zor's submarine. While they succeed off-screen, the spy ends up in a broken escape pod. Using quick time thinking, the spy manages to fix the escape pod and signal the Support Agent. In their final mission, the Support Agent informs the spy Zor has hidden "Machine Z" in his hunting lodge. Once there, the spy solves clues and is attacked by "deer gas" and a "bear archer" before finding out that Machine Z is a gravity device powered by gravity crystals. They also discover that Zor intends to initiate Project Golden Goose, in which the machine will destroy The Agency, which Zor will profit from. The spy manages to destroy the machine using unstable gravity crystals and escapes via helicopter.

=== DLC: First Class, Seat of Power and Death Engine ===
The spy, after stopping Zor four times, earns a vacation mentioned earlier in the game in Shimla, India. However, while vacationing, the spy's train is stopped by Zor's tanks. Through a riddle from the Support Agent, the spy manages to make contact with the Support Agent, where he reveals a Zor agent is aboard the train and has defected to their side. The spy gets in contact with them only to be attacked by Zor agents and one of the tanks, as well as a plane, defeating them all and continuing their vacation.

The spy learns from the defector that Zor is working on something called the Death Engine. The spy breaks into a Zoraxis facility to learn more about the project before it's put to use. There, they solve clues while avoiding traps, eventually finding the intel the agency needs and using a rocket chair to escape.

Using the intel from the previous mission, the spy steals a personnel spacecraft off screen and docks with the Death Engine space station. Though they are initially mistaken for a Zoraxis assistant, the spy is found out later in the mission. Using a robotic arm, the spy manages to gain access to the Death Engine's reactor and using either radioactive waste thrown by the Zoraxis assistant or a crystal found inside the pod, blows it up. The spy manages to survive the explosion, but is officially dead. The game ends with the Support Agent stating that they "expected you to die."

== Development and release ==
Schell Games CEO Jesse Schell wrote in a blog post on Gamasutra that Schell Games Senior Engineer Jason Pratt "pulled together the best of the best VR demos that he could find, and started on some experiments of his own" in 2014. Shortly thereafter, Schell Games Engineer Matt DeLucas "started riffing on Jason’s work" and created Hexius, "a world that used Jason’s unique VR mouse interface to choose where to teleport next." He then turned the teleportation mechanics into flying, which incurred motion sickness symptoms in all members of the team and sparked discussion about the medium. However, the team thought of the idea of a player "having to escape through clever puzzle solving" and "inspired by the famous phrase from Goldfinger, came up with the working title I Expect You To Die." Schell Games then formed a team to work on the game, led by Mike Traficante, former director of Enemy Mind. Sound Design by Audio Lead Bonnie Bogovich, with additional audio by Tim Rosko and Brandon Guillot. The game launched for Oculus Rift and PlayStation VR on 6 and 13 December 2016, respectively. It was made available for HTC Vive via Steam on 25 April 2017. The game was also released as a launch title for the Oculus Quest and the Oculus Rift S on 21 May 2019.

== Cast ==
Voice actors in the original 2016 game release:

- Jared Mason - "Support Agent"
- Bonnie Bogovich - "Zor AI" and "Car"
- Naomi Kyle - "Escape Pod AI"
- Anthony Daniels -"Daniel Sans"

== Theme song ==
Theme song was co-written by audio designers Bonnie Bogovich, Timothy Rosko, and Game Designer Connor Fallon (who also designed the intro credit animated sequence). Song is available for purchase/download on most audio platforms.

- Composers: Tim Rosko, Bonnie Bogovich, & Connor Fallon
- Lyrics: Connor Fallon & Jared Mason
- Lead Singer: Bonnie Bogovich
- The Yinzer Singers (choir): Emily Swora, Anna Ciaccio, George Milosh, Tim Rosko
- Violin: Garrett Overcash
- Trumpet: John Robert Matz
- Percussion: Doug Perry
- Orchestration: Tim Rosko
- Recording, Mixing, & Mastering: Jesse Naus & Red Caiman Media, Pittsburgh, PA

== Sequels ==
Schell Games announced a sequel, called I Expect You to Die 2: The Spy and The Liar, on 27 January 2021, which was released in August 2021. Another sequel, called I Expect You To Die 3: Cog in the Machine, was released in August 2023.

== Reception ==
Reception

Aggregate score
Aggregator	Score
Metacritic	PS4: 82/100; PC: 76/100

Review scores
Publication	Score
Destructoid	8/10
GameSpot	8/10
Hardcore Gamer	4/5

I Expect You to Die was released to positive reviews from critics, with both the PC and PS4 versions garnering "generally favorable reviews" according to review aggregator website Metacritic.

During the 20th Annual D.I.C.E. Awards, the Academy of Interactive Arts & Sciences nominated I Expect You to Die for "Immersive Reality Game of the Year", "Immersive Reality Technical Achievement", and "Outstanding Achievement in Game Design".

According to developer/publisher Schell Games, the game has generated over $1 million in revenue as of August 2017.
