= I Expect You to Die 2: The Spy and the Liar =

2021 video game

I Expect You to Die 2
- Developer: Schell Games
- Publisher: Schell Games
- Series: I Expect You to Die
- Platforms: Windows, PlayStation 4, Oculus Quest
- Release: August 24, 2021
- Genres: Action, puzzle
- Mode: Single-player

I Expect You to Die 2: The Spy And The Liar is a virtual reality action puzzle video game developed and published by Schell Games. The game is a sequel to the original I Expect You to Die (2016), and follows the same protagonist, an agent that must use items within a limited environment to solve puzzles to progress through the game. The plot revolves around the player going through various hurdles as to stop Zoraxis, a megacorporation, from taking over the world. The game was released in 2021 to generally positive reviews from critics. The theme song is performed by Michael Geier aka Puddles Pity Party.

== Gameplay ==
Gameplay is similar in concept to escape room games, where the player must solve puzzles in a limited environment in order to progress through the game. However, rather than escape, the goal is generally related to accomplishing various goals given to the player, such as destroying a laser, defeating a henchman, or disarming a bomb. The game is largely controlled through motion control to emulate the use of ones arms, and a button press to activate telekinesis, which allows for items to be transported directly to the player.

All of the levels progress through pre-determined events. However, some levels can be beaten in slightly different ways, such as allowing a performance to play out, or sending a smoke grenade through a dumbwaiter. Throughout the levels, the player can complete optional objectives as to acquire "Souvenirs", and a hidden trophy is hidden around every level that the player can find. The game also challenges the player to speedrun the levels under a specific time, depending on the level they choose.

== Plot ==
Unlike the original title, the sequel features an overarching story across all of the game's six levels. The game begins four days before the events of the tutorial. The Agent goes through several tests before falling unconscious from some smoke gas. The game takes place at some point in the 1960s, with the Earth being divided into four different regions: The Hudson Federation in North America, the Mediterranean Commonwealth in Europe, the Pacific League in Asia and Oceania, and South Atlantic Union in South America and Africa. The player, simply known as the Agent, is a spy at the Enhanced Operatives Division, a part of an organization known as The Agency.

After surviving the explosion of the Death Engine in the previous game, the Agent and their handler are ordered to protect the Prime Minister of the Mediterranean Commonwealth from an attack by Zoraxis at a theater where John Juniper (Wil Wheaton), a wealthy celebrity and actor, is doing a play. After the Agent thwarts the attack, and the Prime Minister is presumably safe, they board an autonomous jet to discuss the theater attack with John Juniper. However, it goes awry when the Agent discovers that Juniper is actually working for Zoraxis, having received "the role of a lifetime" from Dr. Zor, and directing the plane towards a Zoraxis airbase. After stopping a missile that was launched towards the plane and redirecting the jet, Juniper refers to the Agent as a "pesky phoenix" as they were officially dead after the Death Engine, earning them the nickname "Agent Phoenix". The Agent heads to a workshop owned by "The Fabricator", an engineer building masks for John Juniper. There, the Agent and the Handler find out that Zoraxis is kidnapping the heads of state and making John Juniper a mask to imitate them, dubbed the "Mimic Mask", so that they can gain access to their nuclear launch codes.

They enter a party hosted by Juniper and disguise themselves as Gibson (John's butler), managing to obtain the nuclear briefcase from Juniper, while learning about where the heads of state are being held from a Zoraxis defector. As the Agent receives intel for their next mission, they are gassed and wake up in the headquarters from the tutorial. They discover that it is actually a movie set, Juniper having kidnapped them and using the Mimic Mask to impersonate their handler. The Agent escapes from the movie set with help from the Handler and travels to Zoraxis HQ to stop them from launching the nuclear missiles. When they reach a catwalk above the silo, Juniper sees them and tries to shoot them. However, the Agent deactivates the catwalk and Juniper holds onto the ledge, begging the player not to kill him if he tells them who Dr. Zor is, who appears and reminds John that he was "never running the show". The Fabricator suddenly speaks, and, by order of Zor, activates an electric countermeasure hidden in the mask, causing John to be electrocuted and fall to his apparent death. The Agent obtains the briefcase and aborts the launch using the elevator's power supply. This causes the Agent to plummet to their death while Zor destroys the building, but saving the world.

Afterward, as the world governments take action against Zoraxis, the handler states to the board of directors that a body was never found in the ruins of Zoraxis HQ, implying that Agent Phoenix may still be alive.

== Development and release ==
The game was announced on April 21, 2021, and was released that same year on August 24.

== Reception ==
I Expect You to Die 2: The Spy and the Liar was generally well-received by critics, with both the PC and PS4 versions garnering "generally favorable reviews" according to review aggregator website Metacritic. Critics generally found the game to be enjoyable, but criticized its short playtime and lack of replayability.

IGN gave the game an 8/10, saying "I Expect You To Die 2’s constant callbacks to spy classics like 007 and Mission Impossible are comfortable and familiar, but then you quickly realize this sequel to Schell Games’ fabulous escape room puzzler introduces plenty of unique tricks of its own."

ScreenRant gave the game a positive review, saying "I Expect You To Die 2's increased focus on its overarching plot isn't overwhelming or distracting from what makes the game enjoyable to play, and it is helped along by pitch-perfect writing and voice acting."

During the 25th Annual D.I.C.E. Awards, the Academy of Interactive Arts & Sciences nominated I Expect You To Die 2 for Immersive Reality Game of the Year.
