= Schell Games =

Video game developer

Schell Games, LLC.
- Type: Private
- Industry: Video game development
- Founded: 2002; 24 years ago
- Founder: Jesse Schell
- Headquarters: Pittsburgh, Pennsylvania, United States
- Area served: Worldwide
- Key people: Jesse Schell (CEO)
- Products: Video Games
- Number of employees: ▼70(2026); 150(2025)
- Website: schellgames.com

Schell Games, LLC is a game design and development company based in Pittsburgh, Pennsylvania. It was founded in 2002 by game developer Jesse Schell. The company creates video games and interactive experiences for education and entertainment.

== History ==
Before founding Schell Games in 2002, Jesse Schell was the creative director of the Disney Imagineering Virtual Reality Studio. Since creating the studio, Jesse and Schell Games have worked with and created games for Google, Yale, Legendary, Fred Rogers Company and more.

== Games ==
| Release date | Game title | Genre | Type | Platform | Notes |
|---|---|---|---|---|---|
| September 2024 | Puzzle Sculpt | Puzzle | Mixed reality | Apple Vision Pro | |
| June 2024 | Silent Slayer: Vault of the Vampire | Horror/Puzzle | Virtual reality/PC | SteamVR, Quest 2, Quest Pro, Meta Quest 3 | |
| September 2023 | I Expect You To Die 3: Cog in the Machine | Puzzle | Virtual reality/PC | HTC Vive, Quest 2, Quest Pro | |
| October 2022 | I Expect You to Die: Home Sweet Home | Puzzle | Augmented Reality | Quest 2, Quest Pro | Mini-mission of the I Expect You To Die universe |
| August 2021 | I Expect You to Die 2: The Spy and the Liar | Puzzle | Virtual reality/PC | PlayStation VR, HTC Vive, Oculus Quest | |
| October 2020 | Until You Fall | Action/Roguelike | Virtual reality/PC | HTC Vive, Oculus Rift, Oculus Quest, PlayStation VR | |
| February 2020 | Mission: It's Complicated | Dating/Visual Novel | Computer game | PC | Free release for Valentine's Day |
| July 2018 | HoloLAB Champions | Education | Virtual reality/PC | HTC Vive | A VR Lab practice game show |
| December 2016 | I Expect You To Die | Puzzle | Virtual reality/PC | PlayStation VR, HTC Vive, Oculus Rift, Oculus Quest | Flagship virtual reality game by the studio |
| November 2016 | Frostbound | Atmospheric Survival | Virtual reality, mobile | Google Daydream | |
| November 2016 | Domino World | Casual | Augmented reality, mobile | Google Tango-enabled devices | Google worked with Schell to try Tango |
| November 2016 | Happy Atoms | Education | Physical + augmented reality | Physical + iOS devices | Created in partnership with Thames & Kosmos |
| November 2016 | Water Bears VR | Education | Virtual reality/PC | HTC Vive | |
| November 2016 | Orion Trail VR | Space adventure | Virtual Reality | Oculus Rift, Samsung Gear VR, HTC Vive | |
| September 2016 | Baker Street Experience | Audio adventure | Audio story | Alexa-enabled devices | |
| June 2015 | Water Bears | Education | Mobile game | Android, iOS | Water Bears EDU also available |
| May 2015 | GumTrix | Casual | Mobile game | Android, iOS | |
| March 2015 | Orion Trail | Space adventure | Computer game | PC | Funded by a Kickstarter campaign |
| February 2015 | Innercube | Puzzle | | | |
| June 2014 | Enemy Mind | Retro shooter | Computer | PC | Also a co-op game |

Schell Games has designed and developed a number of serious games meant to change a player's behavior when they complete the game:

| Game | Genre | Type | Platform | Partner |
|---|---|---|---|---|
| Save The Park | Endless Runner | Mobile/tablet | iOS, Android | Games For Change, American Express, U.S. National Park Foundation |
| Peg + Cat | Simulation, Puzzle | Computer | PC | PBS Kids |
| Daniel Tiger Stop & Go Potty | Mobile App | Mobile, Tablet | iOS, Android | Fred Rogers Company, PBS Kids |
| Night Shift | Narrative | Mobile/Tablet | iOS | UPMC, National Institutes of Health, University of Pittsburgh School of Medicine |
| PlayForward: Elm City Stories | Simulation | Mobile/Tablet | iOS | Yale University Play2Prevent Labs, National Institutes of Health |

Schell Games has designed and developed several experiences for partners for casual gaming and entertainment:

| Game | Type | Description | Partner |
|---|---|---|---|
| Among Us 3D | PC, Virtual Reality | A 3D-version of Innersloth's hit indie game Among Us. | Innersloth, Robot Teddy |
| Star Wars: Jedi Challenges | Augmented Reality (AR) | An augmented reality experience containing three games. Schell Games worked on the Lightsaber duels. | Disney, Lucasfilm |
| Annihilator VR | Mobile, Virtual Reality | A mobile VR game based on a comic book series. | Legendary |
| LEGO Brickheadz Builder VR | Mobile, Virtual Reality | Build LEGO brickheadz in virtual reality. | LEGO |

== Location-based experiences ==
Schell Games also operates under "Schell Attractions", when the studio bids for projects dealing with location-based experiences and amusement parks.

| Game | Description | Partner |
|---|---|---|
| S.E.C.R.E.T | An RFID based game. | Children's Museum of Houston |
| Pittsburgh Zoo & PPG Aquarium App | Mobile app that works with Bluetooth and 360 video and games. | Pittsburgh Zoo & PPG Aquarium, Richard King Mellon Foundation |
| Daniel Tiger's Neighborhood Ride | An installation in Idlewild Park that replaced Mr. Rogers' Neighborhood. | Idlewild Park, Fred Rogers Productions |
| Race for the Beach | A turtle game that introduces visitors to the turtle exhibits. | SeaWorld Parks & Entertainment |
| Mission: Deep Discovery | An interactive educational experience that teaches deep sea exploration. | SeaWorld Parks & Entertainment |
