= Marvel's Deadpool VR =

- Developer: Twisted Pixel Games
- Publisher: Oculus Studios
- Director: Daniel Bullock
- Designer: Phil Therien
- Writers: Joe Kelly; Michael Anthony Steele; Matt Entin; Ed Kuehnel; Josh Bear
- Composers: Christopher Young; Gil Young
- Platforms: Meta Quest 3 Meta Quest 3S
- Release: November 18, 2025
- Genre: Action-adventure
- Mode: Single-player

Marvel's Deadpool VR is an action-adventure video game developed by Twisted Pixel Games and published by Oculus Studios. The game was released in November 2025 for virtual reality headsets Meta Quest 3 and Meta Quest 3S.

== Story ==
During a fight with Flag-Smasher, Deadpool falls into a portal to Mojo World, where he is enlisted by Mojo to kidnap several villains, such as Lady Deathstrike, Mephisto, Omega Red, and Ultimo, for his reality show.

== Gameplay ==
Marvel's Deadpool VR is a hack and slash video game played from a first-person perspective. In the game, the player assumes control of the titular character, whose weapons of choice are a pair of katanas and a pair of handguns. Additional weapons, such as the "Mojonir," a weapon inspired by Thor's hammer, and a sniper rifle that shoots tiny humans, can be unlocked as players progress in the game. Weapons can also be thrown at enemies. Deadpool is a highly agile character, capable of performing parkour moves such as wall-running, sliding, and double-jumping. He is also equipped with a grappling hook, which allows him to reach distant points and pull enemies toward him. During combat, Deadpool may lose one of his limbs, though it will slowly regenerate due to his healing power. His lost limb, however, can also be used as a weapon against enemies.

== Development ==
The game was developed by Twisted Pixel Games, which had previously developed comedic games such as 'Splosion Man and LocoCycle. The game spent more than three years in development. Twisted Pixel collaborated closely with Marvel Games, which provided additional input on gameplay. The game was designed to encourage experimentation, as the game allows players to use Deadpool's weapons in numerous creative ways. The game features an original story, with the character breaking the fourth wall, similar to his depiction in the comics and films. Following the announcement that Neil Patrick Harris would voice Deadpool in the game, actor Ryan Reynolds, who portrayed the character in the live action movies, released an "over reaction" video on YouTube to promote the game. John Leguizamo was revealed to have voiced Mojo two months later during Gamescom 2025 that August.

Deadpool VR was announced in June 6 2025. The game was released on November 18, 2025 for virtual reality headsets Meta Quest 3 and Meta Quest 3S. It was the last game developed by Twisted Pixel, as the studio was shut down by Meta Platforms in January 2026.

== Reception ==
Reception

Aggregate score
Aggregator	Score
Metacritic	76/100

Review scores
Publication	Score
Game Informer	7.75/10
IGN	8/10

The game received "generally favorable" reviews according to review aggregator website Metacritic.

Gabriel Moss, writing for IGN, described the game as a "the most complete and entertaining superhero VR experience since Batman: Arkham Shadow", praising the game's humor, length and combat. In particular, he noted that since Deadpool can lose his limb, it created many memorable combat encounters and scenarios unique to each player. He also praised the game for its replayability, as players can play the game again as different Deadpool variants, who will have slightly different dialogue in certain sections of the game. Kyle Hilliard from Game Informer felt that Twisted Pixel had demonstrated a strong understanding of the character, though he was disappointed by the game's humor as he felt that the jokes were not funny. While he enjoyed the gunplay, boss fights and combat, he felt that the design of the game's levels was monotonous.

Marvel’s Deadpool VR reached number one on the Quest weekly revenue chart, becoming the platform’s highest-earning game for the week of 24 November 2025.

=== Accolades ===
Year	Award	Category	Result	Ref.
2025	The Game Awards 2025	Best VR/AR Game	Nominated	
2026	15th New York Game Awards	Coney Island Dreamland Award for Best AR/VR Game	Nominated	
2026	29th Annual D.I.C.E. Awards	Immersive Reality Game of the Year	Nominated	
2026	29th Annual D.I.C.E. Awards	Immersive Reality Technical Achievement	Nominated	
