= Comic Jumper: The Adventures of Captain Smiley =

2010 video game

Comic Jumper
- Xbox Live Arcade cover art
- Developer: Twisted Pixel Games
- Publisher: Microsoft Game Studios
- Engine: Beard
- Platform: Xbox 360
- Release: October 6, 2010
- Genres: Side-scroller, beat 'em up
- Mode: Single-player

Comic Jumper (full title: Comic Jumper: The Adventures of Captain Smiley) is an action video game developed by Twisted Pixel Games published by Microsoft Game Studios. It was released for the Xbox 360 via the Xbox Live Arcade Marketplace on October 6, 2010. It is the third original game created by Twisted Pixel following The Maw and 'Splosion Man, all three of which are exclusive to Xbox Live Arcade.

In Comic Jumper players control Captain Smiley, a comic book hero whose comics are poorly received. Seeking help from Twisted Pixel themselves, he "jumps" in other comics, hoping to glean from each genre's popularity. As he enters each comic genre his design and weaponry change to suit the comic style. In its first month Comic Jumper sold over 40,000 copies, and as of year-end 2011, had sold over 103,000 copies. Critics praised the game's humor, saying the game had several laugh-out-loud moments and excellent comedic delivery. The difficulty of the game was compared to games from the 16-bit console era.

== Synopsis ==
Comic Jumper features unique art styles for individual comics, including Manga (top) and Fantasy (bottom).

Comic Jumper follows the story of arrogant superhero protagonist Captain Smiley and his biologically attached abrasive sidekick, Star. The duo must travel through different comic books, each with unique drawing styles, and complete missions to earn popularity. Four distinct comic styles exist in the game; Modern, which features bold colors, Fantasy, which features subdued colors and watercolor backgrounds, Silver Age, which is presented with cel-shaded graphics, and Manga, which is presented in black and white. When in a respective comic style Captain Smiley and Star's character designs and weaponry adapt to fit the look of the comic.

Following an issue involving a showdown with his nemesis, Brad, Captain Smiley's comic series, The Adventures of Captain Smiley, is canceled due to poor sales. In order to get his own series back up and running again, Captain Smiley and Star, with endorsement from Twisted Pixel, must raise the funds necessary by making guest appearances in other comic books.

In the fantasy comic, Nanoc the Obliviator, the duo help the mighty warrior, Nanoc, defeat Captain Smiley's enemy, Puttmaster, who has turned the land into a giant mini-golf course. In the silver-age comic Improbable Paper Pals, Captain Smiley and Star must assist the young sidekick Paper Lad to find superhero Origami Kid and defeat the feminist Mistress Ropes, as well as the various censors constantly trying to fine them. In the shōjo manga, Cutie Cutie Kid Cupids, Captain Smiley must battle his way through a world of hearts and rainbows in order to rescue Brad, who is being forced to be a heartthrob gym teacher. After completing these jobs, Captain Smiley is able to relaunch his comic which becomes a hit. However, his ego causes tension between his coworkers due to learning nothing from his adventures, resulting in all of them quitting. Meanwhile, Twisted Pixel takes all the profits from the comic's sales, leaving Smiley with nothing.

== Gameplay ==
Comic Jumper is a 2.5D action game in which the player must defeat enemies to progress. The main gameplay revolves around using Captain Smiley's dual pistols and platforming across levels broken up by various segments, which include melee combat, on-rails shooting, and quick time events. In keeping with the game's abstract humor, Captain Smiley can call on the game's developers to perform a special attack, in which live action footage of Twisted Pixel employees is shown over the gameplay, with the developers destroying nearby enemies.

By performing well in each issue, players can earn extra cash on top of their base fee. Additional bonuses can be earned by fulfilling reader expectations, which involves things such as completing a certain section without getting hit. Cash can also be earned by completing special challenge levels or exploring the main base and conversing with characters. Money earned from the levels can be spent on upgrades to Captain Smiley's abilities or to unlock various content, including concept art, interviews, gamerpics, and two additional levels for 'Splosion Man. Purchased items and abilities also increase the amount of money Captain Smiley earns from missions.

== Development ==
Comic Jumper was revealed on September 4, 2009 at PAX. Joystiq interviewed Twisted Pixel's Mike Wilford who cited Final Fight as an inspiration for melee combat, while Contra and Gunstar Heroes served as inspirations for gun sequences, and said the humor as akin to Earthworm Jim. Wilford further told: "Back in the day, there seemed to be a whole lot of mascot-type characters in games, like Mario, Sonic, all those things, and not many devs seem to be doing that anymore. We're trying to bring that back a little bit with our games". Comic Jumper is the brainchild of Josh Bear, co-founder and director at Twisted Pixel. Wilford stated that Bear had the idea for the game beginning in seventh grade. It was released for the Xbox 360 via the Xbox Live Arcade Marketplace on October 6, 2010 as part of Microsoft's Game Feast promotion.

When Twisted Pixel was formed, the developers decided that due to the desired scale they would need to release a few games in order to be able to realize the scope of Comic Jumper. In January 2009 The Maw was released, followed by 'Splosion Man in July of the same year. The technologies implemented in those games were developed with Comic Jumper in mind. For example, the cinematic camera angles in 'Splosion Man were all implemented into the engine in preparation for the game. The game is powered by Twisted Pixel's BEARD engine, which was upgraded to implement RAD Game Tools' Granny 3D technologies. Twisted Pixel CTO Frank Wilson stated: "Granny's highly optimized runtime and suite of tools for both art and engineering provide our development team and our engine licensees the ability to create a highly optimized pipeline for the unique requirements of their games".

Twisted Pixel wanted Captain Smiley and Star to be unique in each different comic iteration. To do so the developers created four unique sets of models for Captain Smiley and Star, and also created unique animations and weaponry for each iteration. When the game was compared to Comix Zone, Whitford responded that inspiration was drawn from it, but that transitions between comic panels and turning of pages were to "savor the moment", adding that the premise of transitions was to create a cinematic transition. Twisted Pixel combined live action video along with the existing gameplay to further the feel of the game being read as a comic book. As with previous Twisted Pixel games avatar awards and premium themes can be unlocked through gameplay. As part of promoting the game Twisted Pixel released Comic Jumper T-shirts and posters as well as a Captain Smiley maquette for purchase. When asked about the possibility of a Comic Jumper comic book series, Whitford responded "we've thought about that", adding "it's definitely a cool idea, and something we might do later [...] but we'll have to see". In an interview given during an Evil Avatar podcast, Josh Bear revealed that there would not be any downloadable content for Comic Jumper. Bear later explained that this was due to the complexity of the game's levels. Twisted Pixel released the game's soundtrack to the public via their website on November 3, 2010.

== Reception ==
Reception

Aggregate score
| Aggregator | Score |
|---|---|
| Metacritic | 74/100 |

Review scores
| Publication | Score |
|---|---|
| Destructoid | 8/10 |
| Eurogamer | 8/10 |
| Game Informer | 8/10 |
| GamePro | 3.5/5 |
| GameRevolution | A− |
| GameSpot | 8/10 |
| GameTrailers | 7.5/10 |
| GameZone | 6/10 |
| Giant Bomb | 4/5 |
| IGN | 8/10 |
| Joystiq | 4/5 |
| Official Xbox Magazine (US) | 8/10 |
| The A.V. Club | B |
| Metro | 6/10 |

Comic Jumper received "average" reviews according to the review aggregation website Metacritic. Critics had been generally favorable of the game's humor.

The Official Xbox Magazine UK (OXMUK) staff called the game "bloody funny". GameSpot's Carolyn Petit concurred, stating that "Twisted Pixel delivers big fun and big laughs in this varied, comic-book-themed side-scrolling shooter". Nick Chester of Destructoid said the game had "laugh out loud" moments and "spot-on comedic delivery". Game Informer's Meagan Marie also appreciated the humor and commented that "Twisted Pixel didn't break the fourth wall; they completely decimated it". Joystiq's Ludwig Kietzmann added that "Twisted Pixel regularly drives a bulldozer through the fourth wall". GameSpot also praised the character design, calling the lead characters "memorable". OXMUK also praised the number of unlockables in the game, as did GameSpot. Official Xbox Magazine's Mikel Reparaz noted that the constant change of gameplay mechanics kept the game feeling fresh and enjoyable. He also lauded Comic Jumper's visuals, calling them "striking". Levi Buchanan of IGN shared similar comments, stating the game had "sharp art direction" which kept the game feeling "fresh and vibrant from start to end".

Game Informer criticized the checkpoint system, noting that on occasion when the player dies they are at an earlier point in the level than was expected. Further criticism pointed to the penalty for death, with Marie calling it "nonexistent". Joystiq noted the game was difficult, citing a difficulty level from the 16-bit era, a sentiment which OXMUK shared. GameSpot also shared feelings of occasional frustration due to the game's difficulty, adding that there were also a few moments where the game's momentum slowed. GamesRadar+'s Matthew Keast criticized the game's sense of humor and repetitive gameplay. The reviewer said that it "just feels like a first-time attempt at a twin-stick shooter, however the devs didn't look at what makes these games function smoothly or provide an interesting and fair challenge". Kotaku's Luke Plunkett said Comic Jumper was "what happens when a developer sets out to make a funny game, then forgets all about the game part".

Todd Vote of 411Mania gave the game nine out of ten: "With plenty of unlockables, good fast paced gameplay, and plenty of hilarious jokes, Captain Smiley delivers in a big way. From start to finish, Captain Smiley delivers a fun and engaging experience with a great story behind it". Later, John de Large of the same website gave it 9.8 out of 10 and called it "the best XBLA game available, period. Not one of the best, not a contender for best, THE BEST". However, Samantha Nelson of The A.V. Club gave it a B: "The game's humor goes a long way toward making up for the weaknesses in gameplay". Roger Hargreaves of Metro gave it six out of ten: "The comedy is an acquired taste, but the presentation is an unqualified success. However, it's the gameplay that's the real problem in this tedious 2D actioner".

In its first month Comic Jumper sold over 40,000 copies, with a total of over 58,000 sold in 2010. Sales nearly doubled in 2011, with 103,000 units moved.

== Legacy ==
In Twisted Pixel's VR game Wilson's Heart, Wilson comes across a comic book of Captain Smiley during his time in Improbable Paper Pals, however the comic cannot be finished as Wilson cannot flip the pages due to losing his arm to an animated mannequin.
