= Wilson's Heart =

Wilson's Heart may refer to:

- Wilson's Heart (House), an episode of the American television series House
- Wilson's Heart (video game), a virtual reality game developed by Twisted Pixel Games
