= 26th Annual D.I.C.E. Awards =

2023 video-game awards event

- Date: February 23, 2023
- Venue: Resorts World Las Vegas
- Hosted by: Stella Chung and Greg Miller

Highlights
- Most awards: God of War Ragnarök (7)
- Most nominations: God of War Ragnarök (12)
- Game of the Year: Elden Ring
- Hall of Fame: Tim Schafer

The 26th Annual D.I.C.E. Awards was the 26th edition of the D.I.C.E. Awards ("Design Innovate Communicate Entertain"), an annual awards event that honored the best games in the video game industry during 2022. The awards were arranged by the Academy of Interactive Arts & Sciences (AIAS). The nominees were announced on January 12, 2023. It was also held as part of the academy's 2023 D.I.C.E. Summit, and was co-hosted by Stella Chung of IGN, and Kinda Funny co-founder Greg Miller. The winners were announced in a ceremony at the Resorts World Las Vegas on February 23, 2023.

As with God of War (2018), God of War Ragnarök led the ceremony with twelve nominations. Ragnarök won the most awards of the night with seven, while Elden Ring was honored with "Game of the Year" along with four other awards. Sony Interactive Entertainment was the most nominated and award-winning publisher, and the only publisher with two award-winning games. Sony, Nintendo, and Devolver Digital tied in publishing the most nominated games.

Tim Schafer, co-founder of Double Fine Productions and known for the games Grim Fandango, Psychonauts, and Broken Age, was inducted into the Academy's Hall of Fame.

== Winners and Nominees ==
Winners are listed first, highlighted in boldface, and indicated with a double dagger (‡).

=== Game of the Year awards ===
**Game of the Year**: **Elden Ring (FromSoftware, Bandai Namco Entertainment) — Hidetaka Miyazaki, Yui Tanimura, Eiichi Nakajima**‡; God of War Ragnarök (SIE Santa Monica Studio) — Eric Williams, Chad Cox, Yumi Yang; Horizon Forbidden West (Guerrilla Games, Sony Interactive Entertainment) — Angie Smets, Jan-Bart van Beek, Mathijs de Jonge, Joel Eschler, Michiel van der Leeuw; Stray (BlueTwelve Studios, Annapurna Interactive) — Koola, Viv, Swann Martin-Raget; Vampire Survivors (poncle) — Luca Galante	**Online Game of the Year**: **Final Fantasy XIV: Endwalker (Square Enix) — Naoki Yoshida**‡; Call of Duty: Modern Warfare II (Infinity Ward, Activision) — Geoff Smith, Joe Cecot, Mitch Sanborne; FIFA 23 (EA Vancouver, EA Romania) — Xinwei Kong, Alex Pascoci, Sean Quinn; Marvel Snap (Second Dinner, Nuverse) — Ben Brode, Yong Woo, Hamilton Chu; Rumbleverse (Iron Galaxy Studios, Epic Games) — Ramon Andres Franco Ochoa, Eric Sheppard
**Mobile Game of the Year**: **Marvel Snap (Second Dinner, Nuverse) — Ben Brode, Yong Woo, Hamilton Chu**‡; Diablo Immortal (Blizzard Entertainment, NetEase) — Wyatt Cheng, Peiwen Yao; Gibbon: Beyond the Trees (Broken Rules) — Clemens Scott, Felix Bohatsch, Josef Wiesner; Immortality (Half Mermaid Productions) — Sam Barlow, Natalie Watson; Poinpy (Moppin, Devolver Digital, Netflix Games) — Ojiro Fumoto	**Outstanding Achievement for an Independent Game**: **Tunic (Isometricorp Games, Finji) — Andrew Shouldice, Felix Kramer**‡; Immortality (Half Mermaid Productions) — Sam Barlow, Natalie Watson; Neon White (Angel Matrix, Annapurna Interactive) — Ben Esposito, Geneva Hodgson; Teenage Mutant Ninja Turtles: Shredder's Revenge (Tribute Games, Dotemu) — Frédéric Gémus, Jonathan Lavigne, Jean-François Major; Vampire Survivors (poncle) — Luca Galante

=== Immersive Reality awards ===
**Immersive Reality Game of the Year**: **Red Matter 2 (Vertical Robot) — Norman Schaar, Iñaki Hernandez Gastañaga**‡; Cosmonious High (Owlchemy Labs) — Graeme Borland, Alexandra Hopper, Hanna Brady, Carrie Witt, Chelsea Howe; Moss: Book II (Polyarc) — Richard Lico, Mike Jensen, Kristen Quinn, Mike Felice, Joshua Stiksma, Shauna Sperry; Tentacular (Firepunchd Games, Devolver Digital) — Luca Scaramuzzino, Simon Cubasch; The Last Clockwinder (Pontoco, Cyan Worlds) — John Austin, Matt Blair, Anita Tung	**Immersive Reality Technical Achievement**: **Red Matter 2 (Vertical Robot) — Iñaki Hernandez Gastañaga, Norman Schaar**‡; Among Us VR (Innersloth, Schell Games, Robot Teddy) — Jennifer Rabbit, Mike Traficante, Michal Ksiazkiewicz, Todd Verdeyen, William Roberts; Cosmonious High (Owlchemy Labs) — Max Burgess, Zi Ye, Ben Hopkins, Ryan Dawson; Moss: Book II (Polyarc) — Richard Lico, Mike Jensen, Kristen Quinn, Mike Felice, Joshua Stiksma, Tyler Walters; The Last Clockwinder (Pontoco, Cyan Worlds) — John Austin, Matt Blair

=== Craft awards ===
**Outstanding Achievement in Game Direction**: **Elden Ring (FromSoftware, Bandai Namco Entertainment) — Hidetaka Miyazaki, Yui Tanimura**‡; God of War Ragnarök (SIE Santa Monica Studio) — Eric Williams; Horizon Forbidden West (Guerrilla Games, Sony Interactive Entertainment) — Mathijs de Jonge, Jan-Bart van Beek; Immortality (Half Mermaid Productions) — Sam Barlow; Tunic (Isometricorp Games, Finji) — Andrew Shouldice	**Outstanding Achievement in Game Design**: **Elden Ring (FromSoftware, Bandai Namco Entertainment) — Hidetaka Miyazaki, Yui Tanimura, Tomoro Inaba, Kaikou Arima, Junya Ishizaki, Takumi Kato, Yosuke Kayugawa, Tsuyoshi Yoshikawa**‡; God of War Ragnarök (SIE Santa Monica Studio) — Jason McDonald, Michael Cheng, Luis R. Sanchez, Andrew Chrysafidis, Mihir Sheth, Denny Yeh, Erol Oksuz, Nick Eberle, Anthony DiMento, Mila Pavlin; Marvel Snap (Second Dinner, Nuverse) — Ben Brode, Yong Woo, Hamilton Chu; Tunic (Isometricorp Games, Finji) — Andrew Shouldice; Vampire Survivors (poncle) — Luca Galante
**Outstanding Achievement in Animation**: **God of War Ragnarök (SIE Santa Monica Studio) — Bruno Velazquez, Erica Pinto, Medhi Yssef, Axel Stanley-Grossman, James Sweeney**‡; Cuphead - The Delicious Last Course (Studio MDHR) — Hanna Abi-Hanna, Chad Moldenhauer, Jared Beckstrand, Jake Clark, Simone Cirillo, Joseph Coleman, Rapeepat Jewanarom, Danielle Johnson, Tina Nawrocki, Jamie Oliff, Stephanie Alexander, Jefferson Bastida, Joey Mildenberger, Loris Pernault, Piti Yindee; Elden Ring (FromSoftware, Bandai Namco Entertainment) — Hideto Nonokawa, Yoshiki Kida, Taro Yoshida, Yuki Kato, Naoki Yamauchi; Horizon Forbidden West (Guerrilla Games, Sony Interactive Entertainment) — Richard Oud, Paulus Bannink, Kim van Heest, Ismael Auray, Daniel Sipes; Moss: Book II (Polyarc) — Richard Lico, Jarrod Showers, Lianne Cruz	**Outstanding Achievement in Art Direction**: **God of War Ragnarök (SIE Santa Monica Studio) — Rafael Grassetti, Dan McKim, John Palamarchuk, Eric J. Valdes, Dela Longfish, Luke Berliner, Christopher Lloyd**‡; Call of Duty: Modern Warfare II (Infinity Ward, Activision) — Joel Emslie, Chris George, Paul Interrante, Jay Barajas, Tom Szakolczay, Dave Blizzard, Velinda Reyes, Charles Chabert, Bernardo Antoniazzi, Riccard Linde; Horizon Forbidden West (Guerrilla Games, Sony Interactive Entertainment) — Jan-Bart van Beek, Misja Baas, Roland Ijzermans, Roy Postma, Ben Sprout, Alex Zapata; Stray (BlueTwelve Studios, Annapurna Interactive) — Koola, Viv; The Callisto Protocol (Striking Distance Studios, Krafton) — Demetrius Leal, Jesse Lee, Aasim Zubair, Glauco Longhi, Glen Schoefield, Chris Stone
**Outstanding Achievement in Character**: **Kratos, God of War Ragnarök (SIE Santa Monica Studio) — Portrayed by Christopher Judge; narrative director Matt Sophos; lead writer Richard Gaubert; artist Raf Grassetti; animator Bruno Velazquez; gameplay director Jonathan Burke; technical artist Axel Stanley-Grossman; character artist Eric J. Valdes; narrative technical designers Mike Grattan and Göksu Uğur; lead combat designer Mihir Sheth**‡; Alejandro Vargas, Call of Duty: Modern Warfare II (Infinity Ward, Activision) — Portrayed by Alain Mesa; written by Jeffrey Negus, Brian Bloom, and Justin Harris; Atreus, God of War Ragnarök (SIE Santa Monica Studio) — Portrayed by Sunny Suljic; narrative director Matt Sophos; lead writer Richard Gaubert; artist Raf Grassetti; animator Bruno Velazquez; gameplay director Jonathan Burke; technical artist Axel Stanley-Grossman; character artist Eric J. Valdes; narrative technical designers Mike Grattan and Göksu Uğur; lead combat designer Mihir Sheth; Aloy, Horizon Forbidden West (Guerrilla Games, Sony Interactive Entertainment) — Portrayed by Ashly Burch; studio narrative director Ben McCaw; conversations director Jochen Willemsen; cinematics director Ismael Auray; cinematics animation director Daniel Sipes; Guybrush Threepwood, Return to Monkey Island (Terrible Toybox, Devolver Digital) — Portrayed by Dominic Armato; written by David Grossman and Ron Gilbert	**Outstanding Achievement in Original Music Composition**: **God of War Ragnarök (SIE Santa Monica Studio) — Bear McCreary, Keith Leary, Peter Scaturro**‡; A Plague Tale: Requiem (Asobo Studio, Focus Entertainment) — Olivier Derivière; Horizon Forbidden West (Guerrilla Games, Sony Interactive Entertainment) — Lucas van Tol, Joris de Man, The Flight, Niels van der Leest, Oleksa Lozowchuk; Metal: Hellsinger (The Outsiders, Funcom) — Elvira Björkman, Nicklas Hjertberg; Moss: Book II (Polyarc) — Jason Graves
**Outstanding Achievement in Audio Design**: **God of War Ragnarök (SIE Santa Monica Studio) — Sean LaValle, Michael Kent, Jodie Kupsco, Frank Favre**‡; A Plague Tale: Requiem (Asobo Studio, Focus Entertainment) — Aurélien Piters, Maxime Touchon; Call of Duty: Modern Warfare II (Infinity Ward, Activision) — Stephen Miller, Stuart Provine, Tim Stasica, Dave Rowe, Dave Natale; Gotham Knights (WB Games Montréal) — Benoit Lafrance, Dustin Reid; Somerville (Jumpship) — Matteo Cerquone, Arron Amo-Travers, Jay Steen	**Outstanding Achievement in Story**: **God of War Ragnarök (SIE Santa Monica Studio) — Matt Sophos, Richard Zangrande Gaubert, Orion Walker**‡; Elden Ring (FromSoftware, Bandai Namco Entertainment) — Hidetaka Miyazaki, George R. R. Martin; I Was a Teenage Exocolonist (Northway Games, Finji) — Sarah Northway, Lindsay Ishihiro; Immortality (Half Mermaid Productions) — Sam Barlow, Amelia Gray, Allan Scott, Barry Gifford; Norco (Geography of Robots, Raw Fury) — Yuts
**Outstanding Technical Achievement**: **Elden Ring (FromSoftware, Bandai Namco Entertainment) — Takeshi Suzuki, Yuki Kido, Takuya Ohashi, Jun ITO, Takasuke Ando**‡; A Plague Tale: Requiem (Asobo Studio, Focus Entertainment) — Nicolas Becavin, Cyril Doillon; God of War Ragnarök (SIE Santa Monica Studio) — Jonathan Burke, Josh Hobson, Stephen McAuley, Vadim Slyusarev, Nathan Kennedy, Axel Stanley-Grossman, Göksu Uğur, James Sweeney, Victor Cepeda; Horizon Forbidden West (Guerrilla Games, Sony Interactive Entertainment) — Michiel van der Leeuw, Stefan Lauwers, Remco Straatman; Teardown (Tuxedo Labs) — Dennis Gustafsson

=== Genre awards ===
**Action Game of the Year**: **Vampire Survivors (poncle) — Luca Galante**‡; Bayonetta 3 (PlatinumGames, Nintendo) — Yusuke Miyata, Yuji Nakao, Makoto Okazaki; Grounded (Obsidian Entertainment, Xbox Game Studios) — Adam Brennecke; Neon White (Angel Matrix, Annapurna Interactive) — Ben Esposito, Geneva Hodgson; Sifu (Sloclap, Kepler Interactive) — Jordan Layani, Edward Sananikone	**Adventure Game of the Year**: **God of War Ragnarök (SIE Santa Monica Studio) — Eric Williams, Chad Cox, Yumi Yang**‡; Horizon Forbidden West (Guerrilla Games, Sony Interactive Entertainment) — Angie Smets, Jan-Bart van Beek, Mathijs de Jonge, Joel Eschler, Michiel van der Leeuw; Norco (Geography of Robots, Raw Fury) — Yuts, Aaron Gray; Stray (BlueTwelve Studios, Annapurna Interactive) — Koola, Viv, Swann Martin-Raget; Tunic (Isometricorp Games, Finji) — Andrew Shouldice, Felix Kramer
**Family Game of the Year**: **Mario + Rabbids Sparks of Hope (Ubisoft Milan, Ubisoft Paris) — Xavier Manzanares, Davide Soliani**‡; Disney Dreamlight Valley (Gameloft) — Manea Castet, Christian Ayotte, Nicholas Mainville; Kirby's Dream Buffet (HAL Laboratory, Nintendo) — Shinya Kumazaki, Shota Yamada, Kosuke Yamazaki, Shuntaro Furukawa; Lost in Play (Happy Juice Games, Joystick Ventures) — Oren Rubin, Alon Simon, Yuval Markovich; Trombone Champ (Holy Wow Studios) — Daniel Vecchitto	**Fighting Game of the Year**: **MultiVersus (Play First Games, Warner Bros. Interactive Entertainment) — Tony Huynh, Katie Hancock, Jonathan Diesta**‡; JoJo's Bizarre Adventure: All Star Battle R (CyberConnect2, Bandai Namco Entertainment) — Tomoyuki Kato, Taichiro Miyazaki, Yasuhiko Tsuneoka, Hironori Yamaoka; Rumbleverse (Iron Galaxy Studios, Epic Games) — Lars DeVore, Leo Rodriguez; SpiderHeck (Neverjam, tinyBuild) — Uvis Zviedris; The King of Fighters XV (SNK Corporation) — Eisuke Ogura, Kaito Soranaka
**Racing Game of the Year**: **Gran Turismo 7 (Polyphony Digital, Sony Interactive Entertainment) — Kazunori Yamauchi**‡; F1 22 (Codemasters, Electronic Arts) — Ian Flat, Mike Tebbutt, Lee Mather; Need for Speed Unbound (Criterion Games, Electronic Arts) — Pete Lake, Kieran Crimmins, Bill Lane, Gary Paterson	**Role-Playing Game of the Year**: **Elden Ring (FromSoftware, Bandai Namco Entertainment) — Hidetaka Miyazaki, Yui Tanimura, Eiichi Nakajima**‡; Citizen Sleeper (Jump Over the Age, Fellow Traveller) — Gareth Damian Martin, Amos Roddy, Guillaume Singelin; Weird West (WolfEye Studios, Devolver Digital) — Raphaël Colantonio, Julien Roby; World of Warcraft: Dragonflight (Blizzard Entertainment) — Ion Hazzikostas, Ely Cannon, Frank Kowalkowski, Patrick Dawson, Holly Longdale, John Hight; Xenoblade Chronicles 3 (Monolith Soft, Nintendo) — Koh Kojima, Genki Yokota, Tetsuya Takahashi
**Sports Game of the Year**: **OlliOlli World (Roll7, Private Division) — John Ribbins, Dan Croucher, Samed Mehmet**‡; FIFA 23 (EA Vancouver, EA Romania) — Nick Wlodyka, Garreth Reeder, John Shepherd; Mario Strikers: Battle League (Next Level Games, Nintendo) — Devon Blanchet, Kensuke Tanabe, Yoshihito Ikebata; MLB The Show 22 (SIE San Diego) — Chris Cutliff, Jason Villa, Luis Martinez; NBA 2K23 (Visual Concepts, 2K Games) — Erick Boenisch, Mike Wang	**Strategy/Simulation Game of the Year**: **Dwarf Fortress (Bay 12 Games, Kitfox Games) — Tarn Adams, Zach Adams**‡; Ixion (Bulwark Studios, Kasedo Games) — Emmanuel Monnereau, Jeremy Guery; Marvel's Midnight Suns (Firaxis Games, 2K Games) — Jacob Solomon, Garth DeAngelis, Denis Moellers, Joe Weinhoffer, Zach Bush, Chris Staehler; Potion Craft: Alchemist Simulator (niceplay games, tinyBuild) — Mikhail Chuprakov; Warhammer 40,000: Chaos Gate - Daemonhunters (Complex Games, Frontier Foundry) — Matt Horsman, Grant Towell, Noah Decter-Jackson, Adrian Cheater, Jonas Van Niekerk, Peter Schnabl

=== Special awards ===
Hall of Fame

- Tim Schafer

=== Multiple nominations and awards ===
==== Multiple nominations ====
Games that received multiple nominations
Nominations	Game
12	God of War Ragnarök
8	Horizon Forbidden West
7	Elden Ring
4	Call of Duty: Modern Warfare II
4	Immortality
4	Moss: Book II
4	Tunic
4	Vampire Survivors
3	A Plague Tale: Requiem
3	Marvel Snap
3	Stray
2	Cosmonious High
2	FIFA 23
2	Neon White
2	Norco
2	Red Matter 2
2	Rumbleverse
2	The Last Clockwinder

Nominations by company
Nominations	Games	Company
22	4	Sony Interactive Entertainment
8	2	Bandai Namco Entertainment
8	1	Guerrilla Games
7	1	FromSoftware
5	2	Annapurna Interactive
5	2	Finji
4	4	Devolver Digital
4	4	Nintendo
4	3	Electronic Arts
4	1	Activision
4	1	Half Mermaid Productions
4	1	Infinity Ward
4	1	Isometricorp Games
4	1	Polyarc
4	1	poncle
3	1	Asobo Studios
3	1	BlueTwelve Studios
3	1	Focus Entertainment
3	1	Nuverse
3	1	Second Dinner
2	2	2K Games
2	2	Blizzard Entertainment
2	2	tinyBuild
2	2	Warner Bros. Interactive Entertainment
2	1	Angel Matrix
2	1	Cyan Worlds
2	1	Epic Games
2	1	Geography of Robots
2	1	Iron Galaxy Studios
2	1	Owlchemy Labs
2	1	Pontoco
2	1	Raw Fury
2	1	Vertical Robot

==== Multiple awards ====
Games that received multiple awards
Awards	Game
7	God of War Ragnarök
5	Elden Ring
2	Red Matter 2

Awards by company
Awards	Games	Company
8	2	Sony Interactive Entertainment
5	1	Bandai Namco Entertainment
5	1	FromSoftware
2	1	Vertical Robot
