= D.I.C.E. Award for Immersive Reality Technical Achievement =

Annual award presented by the Academy of Interactive Arts & Sciences

- Country: United States
- Presented by: Academy of Interactive Arts & Sciences
- First award: 2017
- Currently held by: Hotel Infinity
- Website: interactive.org

The D.I.C.E. Award for Immersive Reality Technical Achievement is an award presented annually by the Academy of Interactive Arts & Sciences during the D.I.C.E. Awards. This award "celebrates the highest level of technical achievement within an immersive reality experience through the combined attention to gameplay engineering and visual engineering. Elements honored include but are not limited to technology features specifically associated with the immersive medium, artificial intelligence, physics, engine mechanics, and visual engineering".

The award's most recent winner is Hotel Infinity, developed and published by Studio Chyr.

== Immersive Reality Technical Achievement and Game of the Year ==
Both immersive reality awards were introduced for the 20th Annual D.I.C.E. Awards. According to the rules and procedures for the 20th awards ceremony, "the immersive reality category panel will be comprised of individuals working directly in the medium". The finalists and winners for these categories would be "selected by a panel of experts and will not be voted on by the general membership body of the Academy". Since the categories were introduced, both categories had several of finalists and winners in common. Lone Echo, Half-Life: Alyx, Lone Echo II, and Red Matter 2 won both immersive reality categories. Tónandi, Starship Home, and Hotel Infinity were the only winners for Immersive Reality Technical Achievement that were not finalists for Immersive Reality Game of the Year.

== Winners and nominees ==
Table key
Indicates the winner

=== 2010s ===
Year	Game	Developer(s)	Publisher(s)	Ref.
2016 (20th)	Eagle Flight	Ubisoft Montreal	Ubisoft	
2016 (20th)	I Expect You to Die	Schell Games	Schell Games	
2016 (20th)	Job Simulator	Owlchemy Labs	Owlchemy Labs	
2016 (20th)	Superhot VR	Team Superhot	Team Superhot	
2016 (20th)	Tilt Brush	Skillman & Hackett	Google	
2017 (21st)	Lone Echo	Ready at Dawn	Oculus Studios	
2017 (21st)	Robo Recall	Epic Games	Epic Games	
2017 (21st)	Star Trek: Bridge Crew	Red Storm Entertainment	Ubisoft	
2017 (21st)	The Invisible Hours	Tequila Works	GameTrust Games	
2017 (21st)	Wilson's Heart	Twisted Pixel Games	Oculus Studios	
2018 (22nd)	Tónandi	Magic Leap	Magic Leap	
2018 (22nd)	Astro Bot Rescue Mission	Japan Studio	Sony Interactive Entertainment	
2018 (22nd)	Beat Saber	Beat Games	Beat Games	
2018 (22nd)	Dr. Grordbort's Invaders	Magic Leap, Wētā Workshop	Magic Leap	
2018 (22nd)	Torn	Aspyr Media	Aspyr Media	
2019 (23rd)	Blood & Truth	London Studio	Sony Interactive Entertainment	
2019 (23rd)	Asgard's Wrath	Sanzaru Games	Oculus Studios	
2019 (23rd)	Pistol Whip	Cloudhead Games	Cloudhead Games	
2019 (23rd)	Stormland	Insomniac Games	Oculus Studios	
2019 (23rd)	Westworld Awakening	Survios	HBO	

=== 2020s ===
Year	Game	Developer(s)	Publisher(s)	Ref.
2020 (24th)	Half-Life: Alyx	Valve	Valve	
2020 (24th)	Mario Kart Live: Home Circuit	Velan Studios	Nintendo	
2020 (24th)	Museum of Other Realities	MOR Museums, Inc.	MOR Museums, Inc.	
2020 (24th)	Paper Beast	Pixel Reef	Pixel Reef	
2020 (24th)	The Under Presents - Tempest	Tender Claws	Tender Claws	
2021 (25th)	Lone Echo II	Ready at Dawn	Oculus Studios	
2021 (25th)	Puzzling Places	Realities.io Inc.	Realities.io Inc.	
2021 (25th)	Resident Evil 4 VR	Armature Studio	Oculus Studios	
2021 (25th)	Song in the Smoke	17-Bit	17-Bit	
2021 (25th)	YUKI	Arvore Immersive Experience	Arvore Immersive Experience	
2022 (26th)	Red Matter 2	Vertical Robot	Vertical Robot	
2022 (26th)	Among Us VR	Innersloth, Schell Games, Robot Teddy	Innersloth	
2022 (26th)	Cosmonious High	Owlchemy Labs	Owlchemy Labs	
2022 (26th)	Moss: Book II	polyarc	polyarc	
2022 (26th)	The Last Clockwinder	Pontobo	Cyan Worlds	
2023 (27th)	Horizon Call of the Mountain	Guerrilla Games, Firesprite	Sony Interactive Entertainment	
2023 (27th)	Asgard's Wrath 2	Sanzaru Games	Oculus Studios	
2023 (27th)	Assassin's Creed Nexus VR	Red Storm Entertainment	Ubisoft	
2023 (27th)	Vertigo 2	Zulubo Productions	Zulubo Productions	
2023 (27th)	We Are One	Flat Head Studio	Fast Travel Games	
2024 (28th)	Starship Home	Creature	Creature	
2024 (28th)	Alien: Rogue Incursion	Survios	20th Century Games	
2024 (28th)	Batman: Arkham Shadow	Camouflaj	Oculus Studios	
2024 (28th)	Skydance's Behemoth	Skydance Games	Skydance Games	
2024 (28th)	Underdogs	One Hamsa	One Hamsa	
2025 (29th)	Hotel Infinity	Studio Chyr	Studio Chyr	
2025 (29th)	Ghost Town	Fireproof Games	Fireproof Games	
2025 (29th)	Marvel's Deadpool VR	Twisted Pixel Games	Oculus Studios	
2025 (29th)	Star Wars: Beyond Victory - A Mixed Reality Playset	Industrial Light & Magic	Disney Electronic Content, Inc.	
2025 (29th)	Unloop	Superposition NULL	CM Games	

== Multiple nominations and wins ==
=== Developers and publishers ===
Oculus Studios, known as Reality Labs, has published the most nominees. Oculus Studios and Sony Interactive Entertainment are the only publishers that have more than one winner. Ready at Dawn is the only developer to have developed multiple winners.

Developers
Developer	Nominations	Wins
Ready at Dawn	2	2
Magic Leap	2	1
Owlchemy Labs	2	0
Red Storm Entertainment	2	0
Sanzaru Games	2	0
Survios	2	0
Twisted Pixel Games	2	0

Publishers
Publisher	Nominations	Wins
Oculus Studios	9	2
Sony Computer/Interactive Entertainment	3	2
Magic Leap	2	1
Ubisoft	3	0
Owlchemy Labs	2	0

=== Franchises ===
Lone Echo is the only franchise to have won more than once.

Franchises
Franchise	Nominations	Wins
Lone Echo	2	2
Asgard's Wrath	2	0
