= Cosmonious High =

2022 video game

- Developer: Owlchemy Labs
- Publisher: Owlchemy Labs
- Director: Graeme Borland
- Producer: Alexandra Hopper
- Programmer: Maxwell Burgess
- Artist: Carrie Witt
- Writer: Hanna Brady
- Composer: Daniel Perry
- Engine: Unity
- Platforms: Windows; PlayStation 5
- Release: Windows; March 31, 2022; PlayStation 5 February 22, 2023
- Genre: Adventure
- Mode: Single-player

Cosmonious High is a virtual reality adventure game developed and published in 2022 by Owlchemy Labs for SteamVR, HTC Vive, and Oculus Quest 2 through Windows in which students attend a colorful and chaotic high school in space with a cast of quirky alien classmates. A port for PlayStation VR2 was released alongside the system's launch on February 22, 2023.

== Plot ==
Upon starting the game, the player takes on the role of a "Prismi", the first of their species to attend Cosmonious High. Their first day immediately begins with chaos when their space bus collides with the side of the building, due to a malfunction of the school's inbuilt artificial intelligence, Intercom. This turns out to be the first of many malfunctions encountered throughout the game, which the player can combat with a range of powers that manifest as and when they need them. Alongside the other students, the player attends a variety of different classes with humorous amalgamated names, such as "Chemosophy", "Visualetics", and "Astralgebra". The other students all belong to one of three other species already enrolled at the school: Flans, Bipids, and Trisks. They all must work together to get the repeated malfunctions of the Intercom under control, all while the school's principal is hiding in his office.

Once the Prismi has successfully rebooted the school using all of the powers they have developed throughout the game, it is revealed that the school's founder, Yuwin R. Cosmonious, had planned all the disruptions specifically for the Prismi's first day as part of the "New Kid Protocol". It had been his greatest ambition to foster cooperation between species in this way. The game's main storyline ends with a dance in the Sports Dome, for which all previously encountered characters are present, to celebrate the Prismi's arrival. Subsequently, the player can still complete any outstanding social quests as well as earn any remaining credits.

== Gameplay ==
The plot of the game progresses in a non-linear manner as the player unlocks more and more parts of the school, being rewarded with credits for completing assignments, extra-curricular tasks, or for cleaning up the school using their array of powers. There are a range of social quests the player can complete for different characters, as well as 100 total credits to be collected. The Prismi's abilities, too, can be unlocked in a different order depending on how the game is played. They include water, ice, crystals (used to fix broken power cables by connecting to ends to one another), telekinesis, wind, telepathy (used to read other characters minds and extract items from their thoughts), resizing, and fire.

The player is given a large amount of creative freedom in how they complete a task. Using the motion controllers to represent their hands, players interact with the virtual environment similarly to how they would in real life. Most objects within the player's reach can be interacted with either through touch or through one of the Prismi's powers. They traverse the environment by teleporting using the motion controllers' joysticks.

== Development ==
Development of the game was announced in September 2021 to some anticipation, due largely to the success of Owlchemy Labs' most notable title, Job Simulator. It was stated that Cosmonious High itself would be the largest VR space Owlchemy Labs had ever built, and that it would fundamentally change the player's experience to be able to interact with "live" characters in this setting. The developers expressed their excitement at how technology had progressed since their earlier virtual reality titles, as well as the opportunities this offered.

The game also garnered some attention prior to release through the developer's collaboration with the creators of Among Us, including a crewmate as an Easter egg.

== Reception ==
Reception

Aggregate score
Aggregator	Score
Metacritic	86/100

Review scores
Publication	Score
Push Square	8/10
Shacknews	8/10
Android Central	4.5/5

Cosmonious High received "generally favorable" reviews according to review aggregator website Metacritic.

Shacknews highlighted the game's colorful appearance and charm as its strong points, expressing excitement at Owlchemy's continued expansion of VR design.

Android Central's review claimed it will be remembered as a classic VR game, though admitted it may not be quite as ground-breaking as Job Simulator.

Regarding its suitability for children, Common Sense Media rated it favorably, praising its positive messages and role models. VentureBeat further emphasizes the range of accessibility features, which includes a mindful color palette, the option for single-handed play, and dynamic subtitles, amongst other things.

During the 26th Annual D.I.C.E. Awards, the Academy of Interactive Arts & Sciences nominated Cosmonious High for Immersive Reality Technical Achievement and Immersive Reality Game of the Year.
