= The Gunstringer: Dead Man Running =

2013 video game

- Developer: Other Ocean Interactive
- Publisher: Microsoft Studios
- Platforms: Windows, Windows Phone 8
- Release: January 3, 2013
- Genre: Endless runner

The Gunstringer: Dead Man Running is an auto runner game developed by Other Ocean Interactive and released on January 3, 2013 for Windows 8 compatible platforms. It is a follow-up to the Xbox 360 Kinect game, The Gunstringer, which was developed by Twisted Pixel Games. It was delisted from storefronts in 2014.

== Gameplay ==
Dead Man Running features a story mode with four main stages each divided into four substages, for a total of 16 levels. Each of the main levels culminates in a boss battle. Players collect gold coins and use them to buy power-ups and customization items. Players could also challenge friends and steal their loot in three Endless Runner levels. Endless Runner levels featured online leaderboards. Its gameplay was compared to Temple Run.

Players dodge, jump, and duck actions are tied to the arrow keys while the spacebar fires the hero’s gun at treasure chests and the occasional pop-up targets. The game's controls were also touch screen compatible. Xbox 360 controllers were not supported. The game features minimal story beats, unlike its predecessor.

== Development ==
The game was developed by Other Ocean Interactive, rather than Twisted Pixel.

In early 2013, Microsoft Studios ran a Windows 8 initiative called PLAY today, selecting 15 games including Dead Man Running for use across compatible devices like Surface tablets.

== Release ==
On January 3, 2013, The Gunstringer: Dead Man Running was released exclusively for Windows 8 devices. The game was delisted on May 21, 2014, due to Microsoft deciding to delist all titles not owned by them, and deemed unfit for their current portfolio.

The game was offered as a free title on Windows 8 compatible platforms at launch, and then was priced at $1.49. The game contained in-app purchases.
