= Lost in Play =

2022 video game

- Developer: Happy Juice Games
- Publishers: Joystick Ventures; Snapbreak Games (Android, iOS)
- Designers: Yuval Markovich; Oren Rubin; Alon Simon
- Composers: Alon Kaplan; Naor Hazan
- Platforms: macOS, Nintendo Switch, Windows, Android, iOS, PlayStation 4, PlayStation 5
- Release: August 10, 2022: macOS, Switch, Windows August 10, 2022 Android, iOS July 12, 2023 PlayStation 4, PlayStation 5 August 10, 2024
- Genre: Point-and-click adventure game
- Mode: Single-player

Lost in Play is a 2022 point-and-click adventure game developed by Happy Juice Games and published by Joystick Ventures. The game, which conveys its story through cartoon-style visuals and gameplay rather than comprehensible dialogue or narration, follows two children, Gal and Toto, as they engage in a session of imaginative make-believe around their house and a fantastical representation of their neighborhood. The player moves the siblings through a series of loosely connected scenes, solving puzzles and minigames using clues and collected items.

The game was developed by Happy Juice Games as its first game over the course of three and a half years, primarily by its co-founders Yuval Markovich, Oren Rubin, and Alon Simon. The trio wanted to showcase children's imagination, with a focus on art and animation, and to make the game accessible to children and players unfamiliar with adventure games. They purposely avoided having a standard narrative structure to make it feel like a game being invented by children. Happy Juice Games connected with newly formed publisher Joystick Ventures after a few years of development, which funded the expansion of the studio to finish the game.

Lost in Play was released for macOS, Nintendo Switch, and Windows in August 2022, for Android and iOS in July 2023, and for PlayStation 4 and PlayStation 5 in August 2024. Critics gave the game positive reviews, especially for its aesthetics and creativity, but had mixed opinions on the length and difficulty of gameplay. It was nominated in categories at the 38th Golden Joystick Awards and the 26th Annual D.I.C.E. Awards, and won the Developer Choice Award at the 2022 IndieCade Awards. Apple named it the Best iPad Game of 2023 and gave it an Apple Design Award for Innovation in 2024.

== Gameplay and plot ==
Toto interacting with a character. The frog is requesting a can opener, which the player has in the open inventory at the top.

Lost in Play is a point-and-click adventure game in which the player controls two young siblings, Gal and Toto, as they engage in a session of imaginative make-believe around their house and a fantastical representation of their neighborhood. How to progress through the game is conveyed through cartoon-style visuals and gameplay, as no dialogue or narration is present in the game. Characters, including both the children and non-player characters such as neighbors, birds, goblins, and monsters communicate in a gibberish language or use gestures, pictorial symbols, and noises to communicate.

The game is divided into 15 episodes, or scenes, such as the children's house, a park with a giant bird, the bottom of the ocean, and a goblin village. Scenes sometimes repeat thematic elements, such as goblins, frogs, and a magic crown, but the settings are often largely unrelated to each other. The first half of the game follows the children venturing out of their house to play, while the second half has them following a map back to their home before nightfall. In each episode the player controls one of the children—or on occasion swaps between both—and moves them around the areas of a scene, collecting items and solving puzzles with them. Many puzzles are separate minigames, such as games of cards, cornering checkers pieces on a board, or assembling airship components, while others involve using clues from the environment in the scene directly. A hint system in the game gives clues for the next puzzle to solve in an episode.

== Development ==
Lost in Play was developed by Happy Juice Games, a Tel Aviv, Israel-based studio, as its first game over the course of three and a half years. It was designed by studio co-founders Yuval Markovich, Oren Rubin, and Alon Simon, who were the principal developers of the game. Rubin and Simon were animators and designers who had previously worked on The Office Quest, a 2018 point-and-click adventure game, while Markovich was a programmer and founder of mobile game developer Nitako Games. The team wanted to create a game with a high degree of quality, but did not add any other developers during the initial phases to keep costs low. The trio initially felt that the project would take around half a year to complete, but then spent the first year of development self-funding a prototype, before looking for funding and a publisher.

After initial discussions with publishers fell through during the COVID-19 pandemic in 2020, Happy Juice Games began promoting the game itself on social media to attract attention. They were discovered by Justin Berenbaum, manager of a project by video game financial technology company Xsolla to connect developers with investors. When Xsolla partnered with venture capital company Nazca to form the publisher Joystick Ventures, it agreed to fund and publish Lost in Play, which was first announced in early 2022. With the funding, Happy Juice Games hired additional staff, including writers, programmers, animators, musicians, and voice actors.

The initial concept for the game was to showcase children's imagination, with a focus on art and animation. All three designers were parents, and Toto and Gal were based on Rubin's children. They wanted it to "feel like two siblings playing a game" of make-believe, and so purposely avoided following a standard narrative structure but instead have scenes and concepts shifting from one to the next. After deciding that the game was "too cute", the team added story elements where the siblings grow frustrated with each other, with the world briefly becoming less fantastical in the process. They chose a cartoon art style to emphasize the feeling of childhood, and were inspired by the contemporary cartoons Gravity Falls, Hilda, and Over the Garden Wall, as well as media from their youth like 3000 Leagues in Search of Mother. They tried to make the game accessible to children and players unfamiliar with adventure games, relying on visual cues rather than written storytelling. The hint system was added to keep players from being stuck or losing immersion in the game by looking up answers online.

Lost in Play was announced at the Future Games Show in June 2022, and was released for macOS, Nintendo Switch, and Windows on August 10, 2022. It was published for Android and iOS by Snapbreak Games on July 12, 2023, and for PlayStation 4 and PlayStation 5 by Joystick Ventures on August 10, 2024. It was re-released for the Apple Arcade subscription service on June 5, 2025 as Lost in Play+.

== Reception ==
Reception

Aggregate score
Aggregator	Score
Metacritic	PC: 82/100; Switch: 84/100

Review scores
Publication	Score
Nintendo Life	9/10
Nintendo World Report	8.5/10
Pocket Gamer	5/5
Eurogamer Italy	7/10
IGN Italy	8/10

Lost in Play won the Developer Choice Award at the 2022 IndieCade Awards, and was nominated for the Best Visual Design category at the 38th Golden Joystick Awards and Family Game of the Year at the 26th Annual D.I.C.E. Awards. After its release for iOS, it was awarded Best iPad Game by Apple in the 2023 App Store Awards and won the Innovation category at the 2024 Apple Design Awards.

Critics were "generally favorable" towards the game, according to the review aggregator Metacritic. The gameplay was praised, with Roland Ingram of Nintendo Life and Katharine Castle of Rock Paper Shotgun noting the "constant novelty" and variety of puzzles along with their integration into the game world. Nintendo Life also praised the hint system for being helpful without giving away too much. Catherine Dellosa of Pocket Gamer and Alex Orona of Nintendo World Report added that the game was well-paced, keeping the player in constant motion through the scenes for around five hours, though Daniele Cucchiarelli of Eurogamer.it felt that was too short. Opinions were mixed on the difficulty of some of the game's puzzles, especially due to the child-friendly aesthetics; Pocket Gamer and Alessandro Alosi of IGN Italia found the game "not particularly demanding", but Nintendo World Report felt that a few puzzles had illogical or obtuse solutions, while Nintendo Life, Rock Paper Shotgun, and Eurogamer.it said instead that some puzzles may be too difficult for children to solve on their own.

The presentation of the game was universally praised; Pocket Gamer applauded the "gorgeous animations and a lovely story", and IGN Italia noted the "exquisite artistic direction". Rock Paper Shotgun said it had "lush and lavish visuals" and was "just the most gorgeous thing to behold when it's in motion". Multiple reviewers said that playing the game felt like controlling a high-quality cartoon. Nintendo World Report, Pocket Gamer, and Eurogamer.it praised the humor of the game, and Pocket Gamer and IGN Italia said that the story felt like being a part of children's make-believe games. Nintendo World Report and IGN Italia noted the soundtrack as good and fitting to the visual aesthetics, and Nintendo Life praised the voice acting for the "endearing gibberish". Pocket Gamer concluded that the game "perfectly captures the beauty and wonder of imagination", while Rock Paper Shotgun concluded that it was "like curling up with a good book".

=== Accolades ===
Accolades
Year	Award	Category	Result	Ref.
2022	38th Golden Joystick Awards	Best Visual Design	Nominated	
2022	DevGAMM Awards	Best Indie Game	Won	
2022	DevGAMM Awards	Excellence in Visual Design	Won	
2022	DevGAMM Awards	Grand Prize	Nominated	
2022	IndieCade Awards	Developer Choice Award	Won	
2023	26th Annual D.I.C.E. Awards	Family Game of the Year	Nominated	
2023	Apple App Store Awards	Best iPad Game	Won	
2024	Apple Design Awards	Innovation	Won	
