= The Last Clockwinder =

2022 virtual reality puzzle video game

- Developer: Pontoco
- Publishers: Cyan, Robot Teddy
- Directors: John Austin, Matt Blair
- Composer: Joel Corelitz
- Engine: Unity
- Platforms: Meta Quest; Meta Quest 2; Microsoft Windows; PlayStation 5
- Release: Microsoft Windows, Meta Quest; June 2, 2022; PlayStation 5; February 22, 2023; PICO 4, PICO Neo3 Link, PICO 4 Pro; June 15, 2023
- Genres: Adventure, puzzle
- Mode: Single-player

The Last Clockwinder is a virtual reality puzzle-automation game developed by Pontoco and published by Cyan. In the game, players use motion controls to record their actions and create automatons that repeat those actions, allowing them to automate various tasks. The game was released on Microsoft Windows and Oculus Quest on June 2, 2022, and PlayStation 5 on February 22, 2023.

== Gameplay ==
Using the Clockwinder's gloves, the player can record their own movements and actions in two, four, or eight-second intervals to create mechanical clones that will endlessly repeat the recorded actions on a loop. The game consists of a series of rooms that must be progressively unlocked by spending different types of fictional fruit, which can be harvested on the ship. Instead of traveling from room to room, the player stays in a central chamber and uses a console to bring rooms into the chamber on an elevator-like mechanism. Each room is a different type of puzzle requiring the player to create and coordinate several clones to grow plants and harvest enough resources to unlock a new room. The aim is often to optimize fruit production using the least number of clones. Over the course of the game, the player encounters a variety of plants that introduce new gameplay mechanics such as Luftapples - balloon-like fruit that float and bounce. The players have to clone themselves actively grabbing, throwing, and handling machinery to achieve the goal of the room.

== Plot ==
The player plays as Jules, a young woman who is tasked with restoring an ancient structure known as The Clocktower. The Clocktower serves as a sanctuary for a collection of endangered plants from across the galaxy, which until recently had always been cared for by the tower's clockwinder. The tower has fallen into disrepair, beginning to sink into the water that surrounds it, and there is no sign of Edea, the previous clockwinder. With the help of Levi who monitors the tower and communicates via the radio, Jules sets off to save the tower. Jules uses the clockwinder's gloves that allow her to create automatons by recording her own actions. These automatons, called gardeners, replicate her movements to tend to the plants, harvest resources, and repair the machinery. As the game progresses, the player works through not only Jules's complicated past with Edea but also uncovers the Clocktower's long lost functionality as a ship, ultimately taking off to begin the Clocktower's next chapter.

== Development ==
The game was developed by Pontoco using the Unity Engine. Originally inspired by the Zachtronics programming games, the game underwent a year and a half of prototyping during which time the developers settled on the framework of loose puzzles that could be solved in any number of ways. The art style was somewhat inspired by Studio Ghibli and Mœbius.

== Reception ==
The Last Clockwinder was well received by critics, winning Quest Game of the Year in 2022. According to Metacritic, the game received “generally favorable” reviews on both PC and PlayStation. It was also named “PC VR Game of the Year” by Road to VR.

=== Accolades ===
Year	Award	Category	Result	Ref.
2022	Indiecade 2022 Awards	Performance Award	Nominated	
2022	Best of Quest Awards	Game of the Year	Won	
2022	Best of Quest Awards	Best Narrative Game	Selected	
2022	Road to VR's Game of the Year Awards	PC VR Game of the Year	Won	
2022	Hardcore Gamer's Game of the Year Awards	Best VR Game	Won	
2022	UploadVR Best of VR 2022	Game of the Year 2022	Nominated	
2022	UploadVR Best of VR 2022	Favorite New Quest Game	Nominated	
2023	New York Game Awards	Coney Island Dreamland Award for Best AR/VR Game	Nominated	
2023	26th Annual D.I.C.E. Awards	Immersive Reality Game of the Year	Nominated	
2023	26th Annual D.I.C.E. Awards	Immersive Reality Technical Achievement	Nominated	
2023	15th Unity Awards	Best AR/VR Game	Runner-up	
