= Marvel Snap =

Digital collectible card game

- Developer: Second Dinner
- Publishers: Nuverse (2022–2025); Skystone Games (2025–present)
- Engine: Unity
- Platforms: Android, iOS, Windows
- Release: Android, iOS; October 18, 2022; Windows; October 18, 2022 (early access); August 22, 2023 (full release)
- Genre: Digital collectible card game
- Modes: Single-player, multiplayer

Marvel Snap is a digital collectible card game developed by Second Dinner and published by Nuverse for Android, iOS, and Windows. The game features a collection of different characters from the Marvel Universe. The game was released on October 18, 2022, after a period of beta testing.

Access to the game in the United States was briefly restricted on January 19, 2025, due to the implementation of the Protecting Americans from Foreign Adversary Controlled Applications Act (PAFACA) banning software owned or published by ByteDance, which owns the game's then-publisher Nuverse. The restrictions were later removed, and the developers have since announced that they would work with US company Skystone Games to bring publishing duties in-house.

== Gameplay ==
Marvel Snap is a lane battler card game. Players each have a deck of 12 cards, and each card depicts a Marvel character with cost, power level, and generally a special ability. At the start of each round, both players are able play one or more cards face down on one or more locations. Playing cards costs energy; each player starts with one energy for the first turn, and their capacity increases by one each turn after, allowing them to play more expensive cards. Locations are randomly assigned for each match, and revealed one by one in the first three turns with each location having a unique effect. At the end of each round cards are revealed and the special abilities of cards trigger. Whoever has the highest power at a given location wins that location, and the player who wins two out of three locations after six rounds wins the game.

Players climb the game's ranked ladder by earning "cubes". A game begins with a single cube as its stakes, but a player may double the stakes at any time by "snapping", at which point their opponent has the option of retreating or acceding to the snap. Additionally, the stakes double at the start of the final turn. Designer Kent-Erik Hagman, and chief development officer Ben Brode compared the mechanic to the doubling cube of the traditional boardgame Backgammon.

The actual gameplay of Marvel Snap is considered relatively simple compared to other collectible card games, and individual games typically last a few minutes. However, the doubling stakes adds extra gameplay depth through betting and bluffing, while the random locations forces on-the-fly adaptation to a player's original strategy.

At the time of the global release the game featured over 170 characters, with the number increasing weekly.

=== Progression ===
In Marvel Snap, players can obtain variants of some of their favorite cards through the in-game shop or season rewards. Variants are alternate versions of a base card's artwork, and do not offer any gameplay advantages as they are purely cosmetic. As of January 2023, there are over one thousand different variants in the game. Players can use an in-game currency to further upgrade a card's cosmetics, which provides progression on a "collection level" reward track. Improving a collection level provides additional rewards, such as more cosmetics, in-game currency, and new base cards. New base cards may also be gained each month, on a rotating basis. Base cards are organized into pools, with the first two pool of cards acting as the initial collection for all players. After collecting the first two pools, pool 3, 4, and 5 cards become available, each with ascending rarity.

Some of the more notable artists who have variants named after them include Rian Gonzales, Kim Jacinto, and Dan Hipp.

=== Game modes ===
The normal gameplay mode involves one-on-one matches where a player competes against a randomly selected human opponent. In this mode, the game employs pre-made decks that are restricted to the cards the player has unlocked. Currently, the Standard mode only offers a Ranked game mode. At the start of every month, the Ranked season concludes, resulting in a soft reset of a player's season rank. The great Merit once achieved top 5. Every player loses a total of 30 ranks, rounded down to the nearest multiple of 10.

Battle Mode enables players to compete against friends by inviting them to private battles. Cubes in this mode do not contribute to the season rank; instead, they affect the player's health. Each player begins with 10 health, and winning a round inflicts damage on the opposing player that corresponds to the cube value. Starting from Round 5, cube values are automatically doubled. This mode was released in January 2023

Conquest is a game mode that incorporates the gameplay style of Battle Mode and introduces its own ranked system in the form of leagues. Each match, players can select which league they want to compete in, such as Proving Grounds, Silver, Gold, or Infinite. Proving Grounds is always open for play, while the other leagues require a corresponding ticket to enter. Players can obtain a ticket by defeating a series of consecutive opponents in the preceding league. This mode was released in June 2023.

In July 2024, a new limited-time game mode named Deadpool's Diner was added. The game mode is a tiered competition mode with ladder-climb mechanics. There are 15 tiers, each requiring a certain number of Bubs, which are comparable to casino chips. After paying the entry fee, players can go all-in and win up to double the amount of chips they started with. The game mode also has a unique automatic Snap feature that doubles the stakes three times starting at the end of turn three. Players can also Snap once to increase the stakes at any point during the match—which brings the total number of possible Snaps to five.

A new limited-time mode named High Voltage was added in October 2024. In this game mode, each game has only three turns. Each turn, both players draw two cards and gain 2-5 max energy.

== Monetization ==
The game follows a free-to-play-model featuring microtransactions for the purchase of in game currency, cosmetic skins and a battle pass. The game's beta release included Nexus event with loot boxes to acquire certain cards or in-game cosmetics, allowing players to gamble for new cards and skins with in-game currency or real money, which sparked controversy among the player base and was called out as predatory by video game journalists. Nexus event and its loot boxes were ultimately removed from the game, and in a later patch gold was refunded to anyone who bought loot boxes. The current system allows players to buy a premium currency and exchange it for cosmetic skins, in-game currency, or various rotating bundles.

== Development ==
Marvel Snap is the debut game from Second Dinner, a game development studio founded by former Hearthstone developers Hamilton Chu, Ben Brode, Yong Woo, Jomaro Kindred and Michael Schweitzer.

The developers stated they used a "grocery cart" approach when designing the game, taking partial inspiration from multiple games, including Clash Royale, Backgammon, and Paul Peterson's Smash Up. A key aspect of development was attempting to create a deep game without introducing complicated game mechanic; developers found that the doubling "Snap!" could provide significant opportunities to bluff and counter-bluff in the game. The game originally had a significant plot, but developers were not able to find any compelling story and decided complete removal of story altogether was preferable to a poor story interrupting the game.

The promotional trailer for the game features Samuel L. Jackson reprising his role as Nick Fury, returning to S.H.I.E.L.D. to discover that he was informally fired and replaced with a nerdy, teenage girl.

== Temporary ban ==
On January 19, 2025, the Protecting Americans from Foreign Adversary Controlled Applications Act (PAFACA) banned software that was deemed to be controlled by foreign adversaries. The publisher of Marvel Snap at the time was Nuverse, whose parent company ByteDance was explicitly restricted under PAFACA, causing the game to be removed from American storefronts like Google Play and the App Store and preventing players from accessing the game. The game was made available again for US players two days later, with Second Dinner saying that they were "working to bring more services in-house and partner with a new publisher". The game later returned to the App Store and Google Play in the US. On January 28, Second Dinner announced that US-based Skystone Games would be their new publisher, with many publishing duties brought in-house.

== Esports ==
Thanks to the developers' focus on accessibility and fast-paced gameplay, Marvel Snap has been the focus of several tournaments. Second Dinner hosted a community event tournament in August 2023 called "Conquerors" with a Conquest Mode's Infinite Run, hosted by Cozy and Dekkster featuring several well-known gamers such as Attrix, Alexander Coccia, DeraJN, and Bynx. Bynx won the broadcast time and DeraJN won the fastest overall time in the 48 hours after the broadcast. Marvel Snap was the focus of several other tournaments, including those hosted by ER Esports and EGL. In August 2023, the streaming platform, Twitch, announced Twitch Rivals: MARVEL SNAP Duos Showdown, an invite-only tournament, featuring a $20,000 prize pool.

== Reception ==
Reception

Aggregate score
Aggregator	Score
Metacritic	85/100 (iOS)

Review scores
Publication	Score
GameSpot	9/10
GamesRadar+	4.5/5
IGN	8/10
NME	5/5
PCMag	4/5
Shacknews	9/10
The Guardian	4/5
TouchArcade	5/5

According to the review aggregator website Metacritic, Marvel Snap has received "generally favorable reviews".

In a review, GamesRadar+ noted the game is angled towards "a generation of players too distracted to keep track of an overly complicated metagame," while praising its approachability and replay value.

The Guardian praised the game's approachable nature in combination with its complexity due to the large variety of locations and cards. The game's use of microtransactions within its monetization was also praised, as they were found to not be necessary for a positive experience within the game.

By 2023, Fortune noted that Marvel Snap had become the top rated digital collectible card game, beating both Yu-Gi-Oh! Trading Card Game, and Magic: The Gathering Online. By 2024, Marvel Snap had achieved 22 million downloads, and more than $200 million in revenue.

=== Accolades ===
Awards and nominations for Marvel Snap
Date	Award	Category	Result	Ref.
8 December 2022	The Game Awards	Best Mobile Game	Won	
17 January 2023	New York Game Awards	A-Train Award for Best Mobile Game	Won	
24 February 2023	D.I.C.E. Awards	Mobile Game of the Year	Won	
24 February 2023	D.I.C.E. Awards	Online Game of the Year	Nominated	
24 February 2023	D.I.C.E. Awards	Outstanding Achievement in Game Design	Nominated	
22 March 2023	Game Developers Choice Awards	Game of the Year	Honorable mention	
22 March 2023	Game Developers Choice Awards	Best Debut	Honorable mention	
22 March 2023	Game Developers Choice Awards	Best Design	Nominated	
30 March 2023	British Academy Games Awards	Best Game	Nominated	
30 March 2023	British Academy Games Awards	EE Game of the Year	Nominated	
6 June 2023	Apple Design Awards	Innovation	Nominated	
