= The Gunstringer =

2011 video game

- PAL cover art
- Developer: Twisted Pixel Games
- Publisher: Microsoft Studios
- Writer: Edward Kuehnel
- Engine: Beard
- Platform: Xbox 360
- Release: NA: September 13, 2011; AU: September 15, 2011; EU: September 16, 2011
- Genres: Third-person shooter, rail shooter
- Modes: Single-player, multiplayer

The Gunstringer is a third-person rail shooter video game developed by Twisted Pixel Games and published by Microsoft Studios for Xbox 360 with Kinect. It was originally planned as an Xbox Live Arcade release, but was later made into a full retail game.

== Gameplay ==
Players use Kinect to control the protagonist. One hand is held as though controlling a marionette while the other is used for aiming and firing the character's weapon.

The Gunstringer is a Kinect title which makes use of the player's body to control the game rather than a gamepad. The player controls the character's movement with their left hand, while the right is used to aim and fire the character's gun. Players can mark multiple enemies to fire on and once the player makes a firing gesture all marked enemies are shot by the character. Certain moments in the game are presented as a rail shooter and allow the player to use both hands to control two guns while the character moves along a pre-defined path.

== Plot ==
The Gunstringer is set as a play that takes place in the Old West, with some modern and fantasy aspects. The game is played as though it were acted out on a theatre stage. It begins with live-action footage in a theater (The Paramount Theater in Austin, TX) where people have attended to see the show. The setting of the play revolves around a character known simply as The Gunstringer, an undead marionette sheriff betrayed by his posse. The game begins as he rises from his grave, bent on revenge. The game is broken up into four different areas or acts, each one based around a member of the Gunstringer's former gang: the desert controlled by the Oil Baron, the bayou being cleared up and settled by the Brothel Madame, the valley being influenced by the Beard Master, and the wasteland and underworld ruled by the Lady of the Dead.

== Development and marketing ==
The game was first announced February 1, 2011. A trailer showcasing elements of gameplay was released at that time. Prior to the announcement developers Twisted Pixel Games shot live action footage to integrate with the game. The video shoot took place at The Paramount Theatre in the developer's location of Austin, Texas.

The character was designed by Josh Bear, President of Twisted Pixel Games. The idea was created during a meeting between Twisted Pixel and publisher Microsoft Studios. During a moment while Twisted Pixel were alone in the meeting they noticed a painting of an Old West-styled skeleton and decided to use it as a theme for their character. Bear later revealed that the idea was fleshed out in the few minutes that the Microsoft Studios representative had left the table. Twisted Pixel's original idea could not be done with the capabilities Kinect then had and the team had to change the pitch quickly. "It was really cool, but it didn't have the fidelity to do what we wanted, it couldn't really track finger movements," Bear said. "I was like 'Oh shit, we're going to pitch this whole thing and they're gonna know that it's not possible with the hardware.'"

The Gunstringer was distributed with a code to download an Xbox Live Arcade Kinect title, Fruit Ninja Kinect. A free downloadable content addon was also released, entitled Wavy Tube Man Chronicles. Instead of the hybrid computer generated/live action presentation of the main game, this add on is a live action FMV rail shooter in the vein of laserdisc games like Mad Dog McCree. Troma Entertainment co-founder Lloyd Kaufman appears as an actor in the downloadable content. The soundtrack was also made available at no charge via the game's official website.

== Reception ==
Reception

Aggregate score
Aggregator	Score
Metacritic	77/100

Review scores
Publication	Score
Destructoid	8/10
Edge	5/10
Eurogamer	4/10
Famitsu	(X360) 32/40; 30/40
Game Informer	8/10
GamePro	4/5
GameSpot	8.5/10
GameTrailers	7.3/10
Giant Bomb	4/5
IGN	8/10
Joystiq	5/5
Official Xbox Magazine (US)	9/10
The Daily Telegraph	3.5/5
Digital Spy	3/5

The Gunstringer received "generally favorable reviews" according to the review aggregation website Metacritic. In Japan, where the game was ported for release on October 6, 2011, Famitsu gave it a score of 30 out of 40, while Famitsu Xbox 360 gave it a score of all four eights for a total of 32 out of 40.

Common Sense Media gave it four stars out of five and said, "Teen and adult gamers starving for a more satisfying Kinect experience should be well served by this unique game." However, The Daily Telegraph gave it three-and-a-half stars out of five and called it "one of the best and most original Kinect games to date, and enormously entertaining in the short bursts of play the device is designed for. Perhaps most refreshingly of all, it can be played while seated; couch potatoes discouraged by the activity demanded by most motion-based titles may have just found their ideal Kinect game." Digital Spy gave it three stars out of five and called it "another strong Kinect title let down by a lack of longevity and a few minor issues. Certainly, the short play time is offset by the inclusion of Fruit Ninja Kinect and the budget price, while occasional control issues are easily overlooked with a little patience. For the most part, Twisted Pixel has crafted another wonderfully outrageous video game, which plays well and offers a great deal of entertainment, however short-lived that may be."

== Sequel ==
On January 3, 2013, a sequel titled The Gunstringer: Dead Man Running was released exclusively for Windows 8 devices. It was delisted on May 21, 2014, due to Microsoft deciding to delist all titles not owned by them, and deemed unfit for their current portfolio.
