= Among Us 3D =

2022 video game

- Key art with the previous title
- Developers: Schell Games; Innersloth; Robot Teddy
- Publisher: Innersloth
- Series: Among Us
- Engine: Unity
- Platforms: Quest 2; Windows; PlayStation 5
- Release: Quest 2, Windows; November 10, 2022; PlayStation 5; December 4, 2023
- Genres: Party; social deduction
- Mode: Multiplayer

Among Us 3D, formerly known as Among Us VR, is a 2022 social deduction video game developed by Schell Games, Innersloth, and Robot Teddy. The game is a 3D version of the 2D Among Us, initially designed as a virtual reality (VR) game. It was published by Innersloth in November 2022 for Quest 2 and Windows via several SteamVR-supported headsets. A PlayStation 5 version via the PlayStation VR2 was released in December 2023. An alternate version without VR functionality was launched on May 6, 2025.

Like the 2D Among Us, the gameplay consists of two teams, Crewmates and Impostors. The Crewmates' objective is to either complete all of the given tasks on the map or start meetings to vote out Impostors and eliminate them. The Impostors' objective is to eliminate Crewmates by killing them. Impostors appear identical to Crewmates, so Crewmates must observe behavior from other players to determine who the Impostors are. The game ends once either everyone in a team is eliminated or the Crewmates complete all of their tasks.

The game received generally positive reviews from critics and has sold over one million copies as of January 24, 2023.

== Gameplay ==
The player faces a pink Crewmate overlooking a dead blue Crewmate near the O2 panel. The normal “report” icon is hidden. Any alive player can report the body (unless reporting is disabled in custom lobbies) and trigger a meeting.

Among Us 3D is a multiplayer game with two teams: Crewmates and Impostors. Crewmates must complete a wide variety of tasks in order to meet their win condition. Impostors appear identical in every way to Crewmates, although they can be distinguished by other Impostors. Their goal is to kill all Crewmate players without getting caught, and may utilize tools to aid them, such as sabotaging a part of the ship that the Crewmates must fix or using ventilation shafts to quickly navigate the playing area.

If any player sees a dead body, they will have the choice to start a meeting with other players. They then can discuss who the Impostor may be, and cast a vote towards who they think it is. Unless players choose to skip the vote, one player will be "ejected" from the ship and it will be revealed if they were an Impostor or not. The ejected player and other dead players can continue the game as a ghost, who cannot communicate with living players, kill, or report a dead body. The game ends once a team completes their goal.

Lobbies support up to 10 players at a time. Players have the ability to customize their character with different hats and other cosmetics. In-game, proximity chat is used for communication purposes. Players can also use the quick chat feature and high five other players. Unlike the original game, Among Us 3D is played in a first-person perspective and adds new features, such as a task styled around Whac-A-Mole, three new maps, known as The Skeld II, Polus Point and Mess Hall, and new roles such as the Vigilante and Wraith.

== Development and release ==
The announcement trailer officially premiered at The Game Awards 2021, titled Among Us VR. In August 2022, an open beta was announced. Among Us VR was released on November 10, 2022 for the Meta Quest 2 and for Windows via Steam. The Windows version supports the Valve Index, HTC Vive, Oculus Rift, and Windows Mixed Reality families of headsets via SteamVR. Those who preordered on the Meta Quest Store received a Mini Crewmate hat. The game was planned for release on the PlayStation 5 via the PlayStation VR2 alongside the release of the headset on February 22, 2023, before being delayed and eventually releasing on December 4, 2023. During an interview, the developers of the game said that they "had to think carefully about how to adapt kill actions, so that they weren't too spooky and horror-like for players." A horse hat was released as an in-game cosmetic for April Fools' Day. Schell Games released a video that confirmed the name of a map called Polus Point. The map features a larger area than the Skeld 2, with more tasks for players to complete.

On February 20, 2025, Schell Games and Innersloth announced that Among Us VR would be rebranded to Among Us 3D and ported to PC via Steam. Among Us 3D later launched on May 6, 2025.

== Reception ==
Reception

Aggregate score
Aggregator	Score
Metacritic	82/100

Review scores
Publication	Score
IGN	8/10
Inverse	9/10
SlashGear	7/10
Android Central	4/5

The VR version of Among Us 3D received "generally favorable" reviews from critics, according to review aggregator website Metacritic.

Writing for Digital Trends, Giovanni Colantonio saw Among Us VR as an improvement over the original. Corey Plante from Inverse agreed with Colantonio but felt that some of the areas were bland. Henry Stockdale, a reviewer for IGN, gave Among Us VR an 8/10 review, feeling that there was a lack of content though the polished gameplay had made up for it. In another review, Ian Hamilton of UploadVR gave the game a "recommended" verdict, calling it "an absolute thrill" and "top tier VR design" while noting the "excellent sound, lighting, and interaction design." The game was also praised by Dave McQuilling for its online experience and simple controls. However, he criticized its missing features and bugs. Hamish Hector called the game a must-play title for VR headset owners in his review for TechRadar. In an article from Game Rant, Cameron Swan says the gameplay "absolutely nails what it set out to do". Android Central's Michael L Hicks liked the game's proximity chat and motion-control tasks saying "The Skeld feels like a real ship crewed by real people" in his verdict. Robert Zak applauded the first person gameplay but hated "The inevitable shrieks" of the players "who don't want to play properly."

=== Sales ===
As of January 24, 2023, Among Us VR has sold over one million copies. According to Innersloth, the game has been played more than 4 million times averaging 44,000 matches a day with players.

Among Us 3D was on the Top 10 list of most downloaded PSVR2 games in 2024, ranking 2nd in the US/Canada and 4th in Europe.

=== Awards ===
Award	Date of ceremony	Category	Result	Ref.
The Game Awards 2022	December 8, 2022	Best VR/AR	Nominated	
The Steam Awards	January 3, 2023	VR Game of the Year	Nominated	
26th Annual D.I.C.E. Awards	February 24, 2023	Immersive Reality Technical Achievement	Nominated	
Webby Awards	April 26, 2023	Best Social Gaming Experience 2023	Won	
Webby Awards	April 26, 2023	People's Voice Winner	Won	
