= Rumbleverse =

- Developer: Iron Galaxy
- Publisher: Epic Games Publishing
- Engine: Unreal Engine 4
- Platforms: Microsoft Windows; PlayStation 4; PlayStation 5; Xbox One; Xbox Series X/S
- Release: August 11, 2022
- Genres: Brawler, battle royale
- Mode: Multiplayer

Rumbleverse was a free-to-play brawler battle royale video game developed by Iron Galaxy and published by Epic Games Publishing. The game was released for Windows via Epic Games Store, PlayStation 4, PlayStation 5, Xbox One and Xbox Series X/S on August 11, 2022. The servers shut down on February 28, 2023, six months after its launch.

== Gameplay ==
Rumbleverse was a battle royale game played from a third-person perspective. 40 players were dropped into Grapital City or Low Key Key and had to fight against each other with the goal of being the last survivor. Unlike similar games in the market, Rumbleverse focused on melee combat, and players had no access to any gun or firearm. Players had several basic attacks, including punches, kicks, and elbow drops. Basic attacks could be blocked, while stronger attacks, called vicious attacks, were unblockable and had to be dodged instead.

At the beginning of a match, players would explore Grapital City or Low Key Key and collect various items hidden inside boxes including melee weapons such as baseball bats and chairs, magazines that teach special moves, and potions that increased the player's stats such as health, stamina and strength. Every building in the game was climbable, allowing players to quickly navigate through Grapital City and reach strategic positions. Similar to other battle royale games, players had to stay within a shrinking circle. When the player was outside the circle, a timer began counting down from 10. Players were disqualified once the timer reaches zero. Iron Galaxy estimated that each match lasted around 12–15 minutes.

Rumbleverse utilized a battle pass model. As players progressed in the game, they could earn Fame, which unlocked in-game cosmetics. Players could also purchase Brawlla Bills, another type of currency which was purchased through microtransactions.

== Development ==
The game was developed by Iron Galaxy. The studio, when developing Rumbleverse, drew from their experience working on live service games, as they were involved in porting Fortnite and The Elder Scrolls Online to consoles. The idea of developing a pro wrestling game first originated from Iron Galaxy's co-CEO Chelsea Blasko in October 2017. The idea led to the creation of the timer, which was considered to be "a convenient homage to the wrestling world" by the team. Traversal was considered to be an important gameplay pillar. Adam Boyes, the CEO of the studio, described it as "a very important, almost main character" for Rumbleverse, and added that players who are familiar with speedrunning and platform games such as Crash Bandicoot and Mario win a match most frequently as they understand how to navigate the map efficiently. The team believed that the lack of firearms in the game would compel players to change the tactics they usually use in other battle royale games, resulting in a different gameplay experience.

Rumbleverse was first announced at The Game Awards 2021 by Iron Galaxy and Epic Games Publishing. Initially set to be released on February 15, 2022, the game was delayed so that the development team could add more content. Rumbleverse was released for PC via the Epic Games Store, PlayStation 4, PlayStation 5, Xbox One and Xbox Series X and Series S on August 11 of the same year. Several online playtesting sessions were held. The final season was released on November 16 of the same year.

The game was taken offline on February 28, 2023 and all in-game purchases since launch were eligible for a refund.

== Reception ==
During the 26th Annual D.I.C.E. Awards, the Academy of Interactive Arts & Sciences nominated Rumbleverse for Online Game of the Year and Fighting Game of the Year.
