= The Maw =

2009 video game

- Xbox Live Arcade cover
- Developers: Twisted Pixel Games; Hothead Games (PC)
- Publisher: Microsoft Game Studios
- Composer: Winifred Phillips
- Engine: Beard
- Platforms: Xbox 360; Microsoft Windows
- Release: January 21, 2009; Microsoft Windows; March 9, 2009
- Genre: Action-adventure
- Mode: Single-player

The Maw is a 2009 action-adventure video game developed by Twisted Pixel Games and published by Microsoft Game Studios for the Xbox 360. A port for Microsoft Windows developed by Hothead Games was released the same year. The game centers on the extraterrestrial pair Frank and The Maw, a purple, amorphous creature, whose spacecraft crashed on an alien planet. The player assumes the role of Frank and directs The Maw—which can take on the abilities of objects and fauna it consumes—via a leash.

The game won the 2008 Audience Choice award at PAX10, and was a finalist at the 2009 Independent Games Festival. By the end of 2011, The Maw had sold more than 237,000 units.

== Synopsis and gameplay ==
In The Maw characters Frank (right) and The Maw (left) must team up to escape capture from bounty hunters.

The Maw is set in a futuristic universe. The game begins with Frank, a pacifist bipedal alien, and The Maw, a purple blob-like creature with one eye and a mouth, both having been captured by the Galactic Bounty Hunters. For unknown reasons, the ship on which they are being held crash lands on a strange planet, killing all the crew. Alone, they set out for a communications tower in the distance while on the run from other Galactic Bounty Hunters who have come to recapture them.

In The Maw players control Frank, who in turn controls The Maw via an electrical leash that he uses to keep him from wandering too far. When the leash is inactive, the player can call The Maw to their location. Gameplay involves guiding The Maw to clear obstacles and complete levels. The Maw also has the ability to eat objects and creatures, taking on some of the properties of its prey, such as breathing fire, flying, or charging. Players then use The Maw's newfound (and temporary) abilities to navigate previously unreachable sections of a level. After eating a set amount of anything, The Maw grows bigger and bigger as the game progresses.

== Development and marketing ==
Twisted Pixel Games announced in June 2008 its plans to release The Maw as its first original title for the company. Previously, the company had worked with Midway Games to develop the 2004 game NBA Ballers.

Hothead Games, a Vancouver-based independent video game developer, partnered with Twisted Pixel Games to bring The Maw to Microsoft Windows. It was released for the PC on March 9, 2009. The Maw soundtrack was composed by Winifred Phillips and produced by Winnie Waldron, who together designed the music interactivity for the game.

=== Downloadable content ===
Twisted Pixel released three new levels for the game as downloadable content, Brute Force, River Redirect, and Speeder Lane. Once downloaded, the new levels are selectable from the in-game menu as "deleted scenes", taking place at various points between original levels in the storyline. Brute Force and River Redirect were released for Xbox 360 on February 18 and March 11, 2009 respectively. Both were released together for the Steam version of the game on March 16 shortly after. Speeder Lane was released on April 30.

When interviewed by Gamasutra, Twisted Pixel CEO Michael Wilford revealed that though the developers had plans for downloadable content from the beginning, decisions on what would be included in that content were not made until after the game was released: "[We] didn't work on them in any way until after the main game was wrapped. Once the game was out of our hands, we went back to the drawing board to design everything from scratch, but we obviously had a lot of half-finished pieces on the cutting room floor that we could leverage". Wilford further explained that due to the way The Maw ends, creating an epilogue would not be possible. Therefore, plans were made for the downloadable content to be dubbed "Deleted Scenes"; levels that take place inside the story of the main game. Wilford was quick to note that these levels were not simply unlock codes that provided the player with access to things already in the game: "I think some people took it to mean that we intentionally stripped out levels that were 100 percent complete only to sell them as DLC", adding that it was "not the case".

=== Legacy ===
Maw appears in Splosion Man (2009) in one of the space levels and Ms. Splosion Man (2011) as a unlockable piece of artwork.

Maw makes a cameo as one of twelve friends in Dust: An Elysian Tail (2012).

== Reception ==
Reception

Aggregate score
Aggregator	Score	
Aggregator	PC	Xbox 360
Metacritic	75/100	75/100

Review scores
Publication	Score	
Publication	PC	Xbox 360
Destructoid	N/A	8/10
Edge	N/A	5/10
Eurogamer	N/A	7/10
GamePro	N/A	4.5/5
GameRevolution	N/A	B
GameSpot	N/A	7/10
Giant Bomb	N/A	4/5
IGN	8/10	8/10
Official Xbox Magazine (US)	N/A	7/10
PC Gamer (UK)	71%	N/A
The A.V. Club	N/A	A−
Teletext GameCentral	N/A	6/10

The Maw received "generally favorable reviews" on both platforms according to the review aggregation website Metacritic.

IGN's Erik Brudvig praised the game, citing colorful graphics and easy yet fun gameplay. Brudvig also praised its music: "The soundtrack is excellent and fits the feel of the game perfectly". Phillip Kollar of GamesRadar+ lauded the Xbox 360 version's character designs, calling Frank and The Maw "adorable main characters". Kollar further expressed appreciation for the ability to learn to play the game without tutorial levels. TeamXbox's Dale Nardozzi lauded the gameplay, visuals and audio: "Roll [them] together and you have one very tasty yumyum, not to mention one of the better original IP’s to hit Xbox Live Arcade in awhile [sic?]".

Criticism of The Maw typically pointed to the game's short play time. Edge stated that the Xbox 360 version was fun "while it lasts", a sentiment which Kevin VanOrd of GameSpot shared. Game Revolution's Eduardo Reboucas also agreed: "Enjoy it while it lasts, though, because Maw's stay isn't a very long one". Brudvig added: "The game can easily be beaten in a weekend of light playing. Some might play again to find everything, but most will call it a day".

The game won the 2008 Audience Choice award at PAX10, and was a finalist at the Independent Games Festival 2009. The Maw sold over 34,000 copies its first week of release, in May 2009 sales increased to 95,000 units, and by October of the same year had sold over 113,000 copies. Although sales slowed during the winter, the game still sold over one 144,000 units as of the end of January 2010. As of year-end 2010, The Maw had moved more than 169,000 units with its downloadable content selling more than 52,000 units collectively. Sales as of year-end 2011 were over 237,000 units on Xbox Live Arcade. Collective sales of downloadable content exceeded a total of 60,000 units that same year. Gamasutra also awarded the game with an honorable mention in its Top 5 Console Downloadable Games of 2009.
