= Job Simulator =

2016 video game

Job Simulator: The 2050 Archives
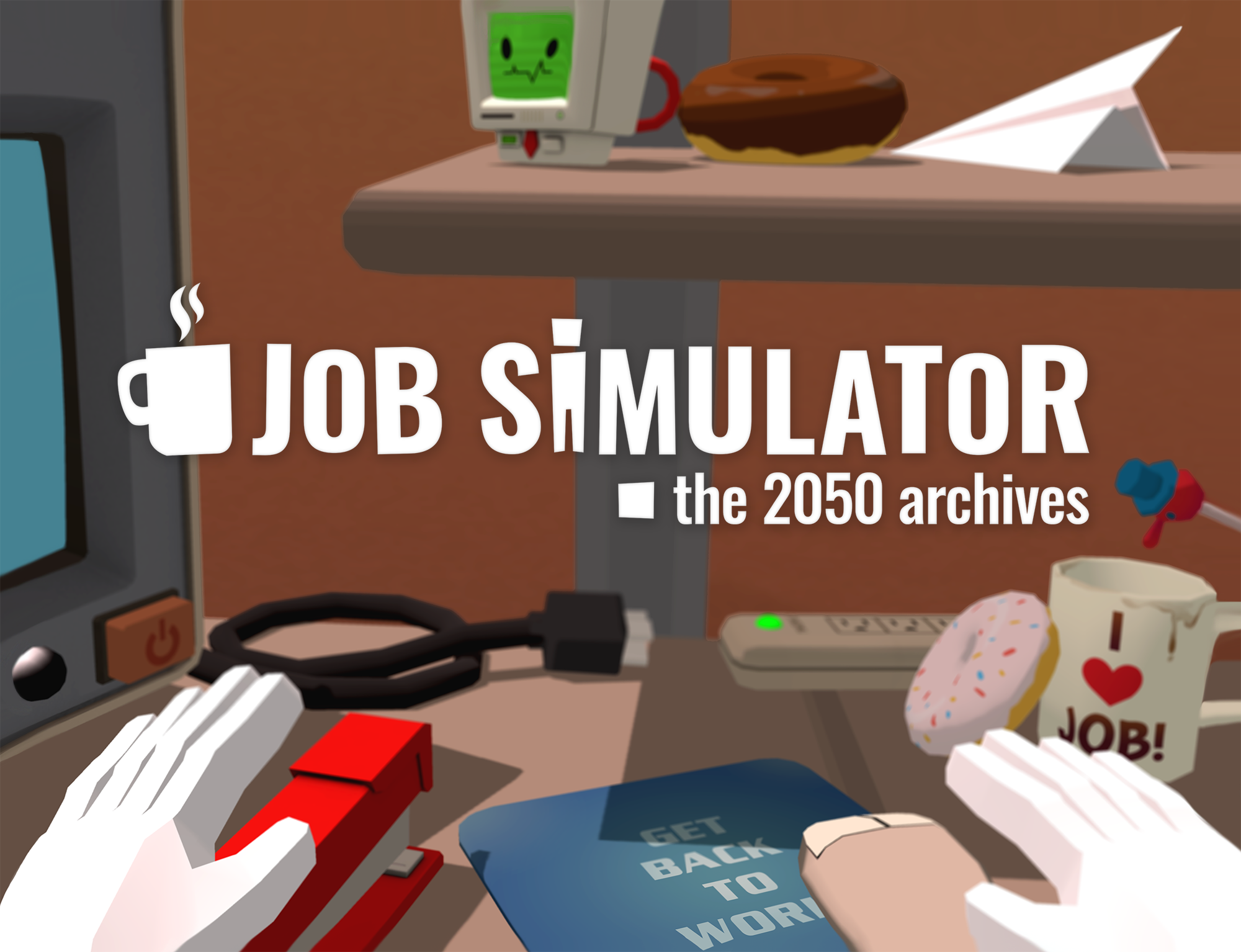
- Developer: Owlchemy Labs
- Publisher: Owlchemy Labs
- Director: Alex Schwartz
- Designers: Alex Schwartz, Devin Reimer, Carrie Witt, Graeme Borland, Ty Burks, Maxwell Burgess
- Artists: Carrie Witt, Ty Burks
- Composers: Funky Rustic, Alexander Brandon, Jameson Sutton
- Engine: Unity
- Platforms: Windows, PlayStation 4, Oculus Quest, PlayStation 5, visionOS
- Release: Windows; April 5, 2016; PlayStation 4; October 13, 2016; Oculus Quest; May 21, 2019; PlayStation 5; February 22, 2023; visionOS; May 29, 2024
- Genre: Simulation
- Mode: Single-player

Job Simulator: The 2050 Archives, (also known as simply Job Simulator), is a virtual reality simulation video game developed and published by Owlchemy Labs for Microsoft Windows, PlayStation 4, PlayStation 5, Apple Vision Pro, Oculus Quest, Oculus Quest 2 and Meta Quest 3, in which players participate in comical approximations of real-world jobs. A sequel, Vacation Simulator, was released in 2019 and has a completely different premise.

== Gameplay ==
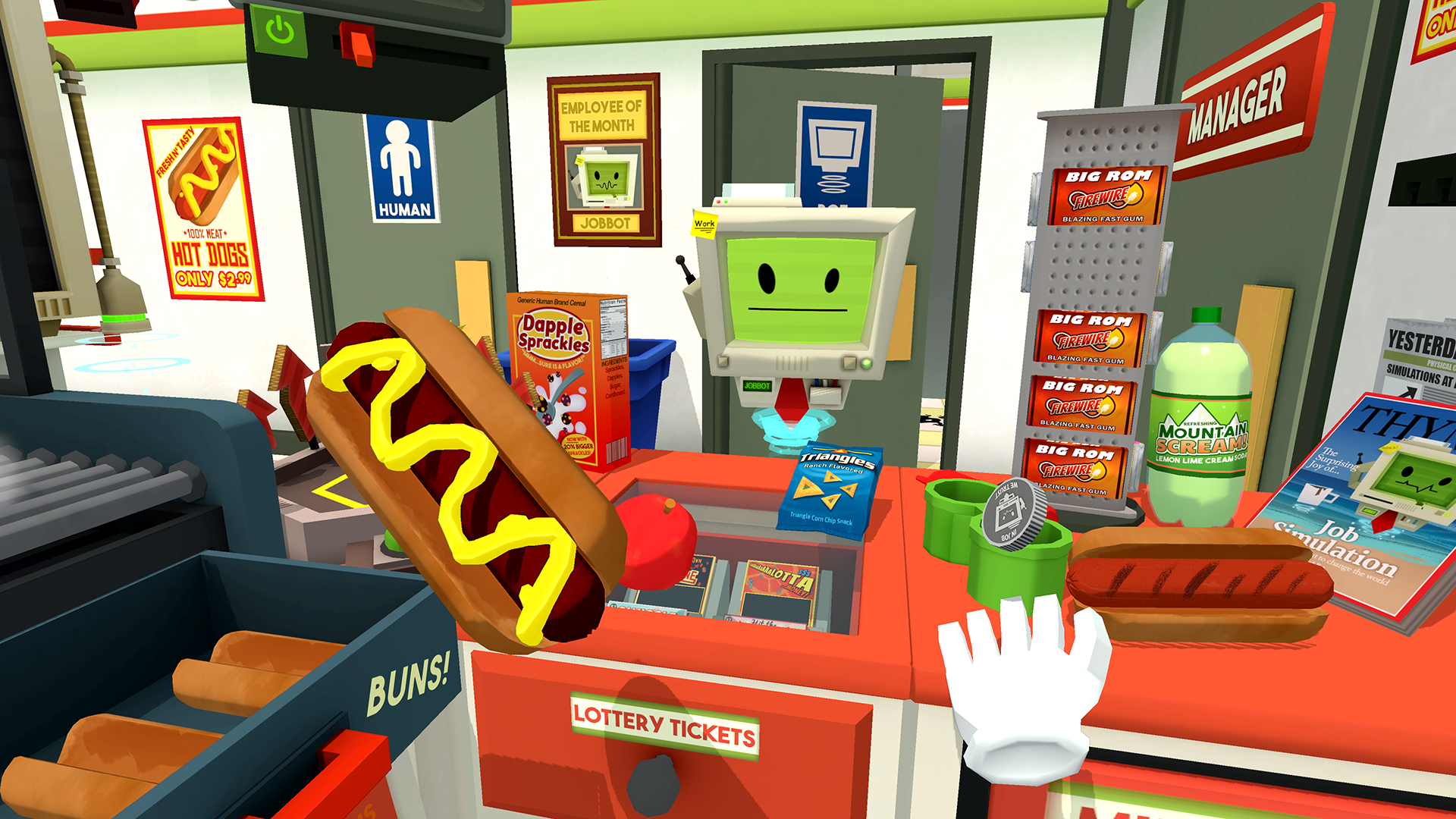
In-game screenshot of the "Store Clerk" occupation

Players participate in simulated jobs in a job museum run by robots resembling floating CRT computer monitors with faces. The jobs are represented as tongue-in-cheek approximations of real occupations: "Office Worker", "Gourmet Chef", "Store Clerk", and "Auto Mechanic". Accompanied by a computer character who provides exposition and instructions, players perform tasks associated with that occupation, some of them realistic and others comical. For example, in the "Office Worker" simulation, players engage in activities like evaluating new employees and transferring calls, but are also called upon to eat doughnuts, share photos at the water cooler, and participate in other office tasks.

Using the motion controllers of the HTC Vive, Oculus Touch, PlayStation Move, Windows Mixed Reality headsets, Valve Index, PlayStation VR2 Sense controllers, or depending on the platform, to represent their hands, players interact with the virtual environment similarly to how they would in real life. Most objects within the player's reach can be interacted with - many can be picked up and manipulated, while fixed objects such as keyboards and appliances will have buttons, levers, or dials that the player can utilize. After completing a certain amount of tasks, the player is offered to go back to the museum or continue interacting with the environment. Once the player completes all four job simulations, they're offered a variety of modifiers that change the physics of the gameplay.

The player is often afforded a large amount of creative freedom in how they complete a task. For example, when cooking pizza in the chef simulation, players can choose any ingredient they can reach, such as bacon, eggs, apples, or cookies to use as pizza toppings. When performing car repairs in the auto-mechanic simulation, players can choose what style of parts to use as replacements (for example, when replacing a flat tire, the player can choose from any of 9 available tire styles) and are allowed to perform repairs and replacements that aren't requested by the customer. The player is also free to mess around with the various objects in their reach, such as throwing things in trash cans or at robots, eating food lying around or taking the sunglasses off a customer.

Much of the game's humor comes from both stereotypical and exaggerated situations in the jobs performed; as a chef, the player is asked to bribe a food critic and navigate around the particular allergies of an underage customer having a birthday (however, the game doesn't punish you if you don't); as a car mechanic, the boss instructs the player to sabotage cars or strip a car for parts. Some of the game's humor comes from puns and other forms of word play: as an auto mechanic, one of the nine varieties of tires the player can give customers resembles a chocolate-covered doughnut with sprinkles as a play on the informal term "donut tires" often used to describe compact spare tires that are generally unsuitable for driving long distances; as a chef, the player is instructed to bake a cake for an underage customer's birthday party, and one of the ingredients is a flower, which sounds phonetically similar to "flour." The instructor also continually comments on the human nature of the jobs being at odds with the efficiency of robots, the obsolescence of humans in general, and at one point references an event called "the human uprising of 2027".

The game also features a special "spectator mode" that serves to provide a more entertaining perspective to the viewers who are observing someone playing the game: aside from the first person view, the player wearing the helmet can position cameras around themselves and switch between them, which then provide a viewport to the external screen of the VR setup; the player is then represented as a disembodied VR helmet and two gloves. This is only available on Windows.

== Development ==
Trailer of sample gameplay

Job Simulator was the first game announced for the SteamVR device. The game was also included with the HTC Vive at its launch on April 5, 2016. The developers later lowered the game's price in response to customer reviews. The developers created a "smaller human mode" for players who could not reach objects placed higher in the virtual reality environment. The game uses the Unity game engine.

== Reception ==
Reception

Aggregate score
Aggregator	Score
Metacritic	PC: 68/100; PS4: 71/100

Review scores
Publication	Score
Destructoid	6.5/10
Edge	7/10
Game Informer	6.5/10
IGN	7.5/10
PlayStation Official Magazine – UK	7/10
PC Gamer (US)	74/100

Polygon wrote that the game's spectator mode, in which the player can move a floating camera in the virtual space, was the perfect way to stream and spectate within virtual reality. Kotaku wrote that Job Simulator was one of the few games that felt like complete experiences at the HTC Vive's launch.

Job Simulator won the Best VR/AR Game award at the 17th Game Developers Choice Awards. During the 20th Annual D.I.C.E. Awards, the Academy of Interactive Arts & Sciences nominated Job Simulator for "Immersive Reality Game of the Year" and "Immersive Reality Technical Achievement". The Official UK PlayStation Magazine listed it as the thirteenth best PS VR game.

Job Simulator is rated "Strong" on OpenCritic, with a top critic average of 75 and 50% of its 19 critics recommending the game. Many critics praised the high production value and fun initial impression, but some were disappointed by the lack of depth and replay value.

=== Sales ===
Owlchemy Labs announced that Job Simulator had sold "over 1 million units" and had officially gone platinum. In their press release, Owlchemy Labs claimed that they were the second "made for VR" title to achieve this milestone. Job Simulator debuted in the top 10 PSVR games during its launch in October 2016 and still was as of the press release in January 2020. It was also the #1 PSVR game for 2017 through 2019.
