= Ben Brode =

American video game designer

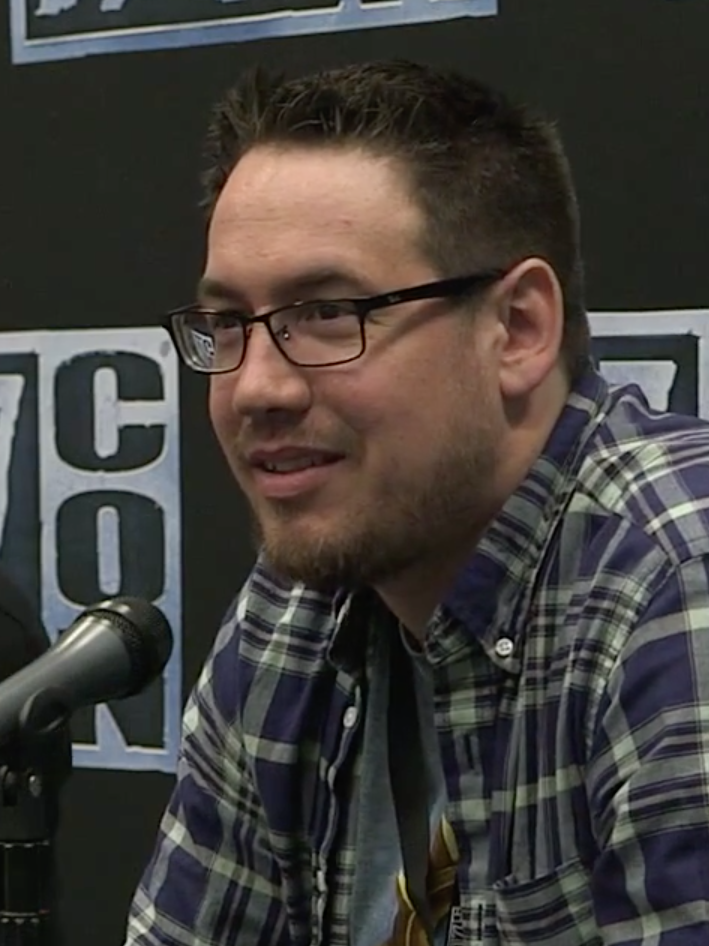
- Brode at BlizzCon 2013
- Occupation: Video game designer
- Employers: Blizzard Inc. (2003–2018); Second Dinner (2018–present)
- Known for: Lead designer of Hearthstone (2015–2018)

Ben Brode is an American video game designer. He was the game director and public face of Hearthstone until 2018 when he left to found his own game studio, Second Dinner, where he is now Chief Development Officer.

== Life and career ==
Brode joined Blizzard Entertainment as a video game tester at the age of 20, working on Warcraft III and World of Warcraft, a position in which he worked for a total of 18 months before becoming Environment Test Lead. During his work testing these games he spent time making custom maps for Warcraft III, one of which became 'Map of the Week' and was released to the wider community. Brode began looking for a new position at Blizzard, including applying for a position as a designer on StarCraft II, before finding himself in a creative position on the World of Warcraft Trading Card Game.

Brode became lead designer of Hearthstone in 2015, and was promoted to game director later in the year. While working on Hearthstone, Brode was the public face of the game, giving interviews, responding to player feedback, explaining game concepts, and providing updates on the game's development. When the Journey To Un'Goro expansion was released without an accompanying song, he recorded his own at the community's request.

After 15 years working at Blizzard, Brode left the company in 2018 to start his own game development studio called Second Dinner along with several other ex-Blizzard employees. Brode is the Chief Development Officer at the company. In 2019 the company announced that it had received a US$30 million investment from NetEase, along with the license to create a mobile game for Marvel. The game, Marvel Snap, was first revealed in May 2022, for mobile devices and personal computers. In designing Marvel Snap, Brode said he was directly inspired by his experiences working on the World of Warcraft Trading Card Game and Hearthstone - he wanted to make a card game that was quicker to play and had a lower barrier to entry.
