= 'Splosion Man =

2009 video game

- Developer: Twisted Pixel Games
- Publisher: Microsoft Games Studios
- Engine: Beard
- Platform: Xbox 360
- Release: July 22, 2009
- Genres: Action, platform
- Modes: Single-player, multiplayer

'Splosion Man is a 2009 platformer video game developed by Twisted Pixel Games for the Xbox 360, available through the Xbox Live Arcade digital download service. Released on July 22, 2009, as part of the Xbox Live Summer of Arcade, the game follows 'Splosion Man—an escaped science experiment with the ability to explode himself repeatedly—as he works his way through obstacles and traps trying to exit the fictional laboratory known as Big Science.

'Splosion Man received positive reviews, and was voted by Xbox Live players as the Best Original XBLA Game of 2009. IGN listed the game eleventh in their top twenty-five Xbox Live Arcade titles of all time. 'Splosion Man placed thirteenth overall in sales and as of year-end 2011 had sold over 487,000 units. A sequel, titled Ms. Splosion Man, was released on July 13, 2011.

== Gameplay ==
Players control 'Splosion Man, an escaped science experiment with the ability to explode himself repeatedly.

'Splosion Man is a puzzle platformer where the player character and titular protagonist, 'Splosion Man, possesses the power to detonate himself due to an accident at a laboratory called Big Science. Using this power, the player must escape the facility by going through a series of levels containing different puzzles, traps, and enemies. This act of self-detonation, called a "'splode", is the only form of combat, allowing the player to jump, kill enemies, and destroy obstacles. The player can only use the 'splode thrice consecutively before a cooldown.

'Splosion Man includes a story mode consisting of fifty levels, including three bosses, as well as up to four-player cooperative gameplay, with fifty coop-exclusive levels. When playing cooperatively the players are each presented in a different color to distinguish them from others. All players share the same screen which zooms in and out according to how close players are to one another. The game does not contain any usable items, but hidden in each level is a cake which can be consumed for extra points or achievements.

== Development and marketing ==
Pre-production for 'Splosion Man began in early 2008, coinciding with winding down of development of The Maw, another Twisted Pixel Games title. The pre-production began in order to keep the team working on a title once The Maw was completed. Production began in December 2008, and development began in January 2009. In April 1, Twisted Pixel released a press announcement that a new game called 'Splosion Man would be released onto the Xbox Live Arcade. The next day, Twisted Pixel confirmed that the game wasn't an April Fool's Day hoax and that it would be released later in the year. It was featured at the 2009 PAX convention at Twisted Pixel's booth. 'Splosion Man was released for Xbox Live Arcade on July 22. It was the first of five titles to be released as part of Microsoft's Summer of Arcade for the Xbox 360. The developers specifically timed the development cycle so in hopes that it would be one of the titles included.

The premise for 'Splosion Man spawned from a random idea proposed by Sean Riley, one of the developers involved in the game. His idea was to develop a game about "a guy who splodes in a world only made of glass". The team joked about the concept until it eventually progressed into a full-fledged video game. 'Splosion Man was made a downloadable title due its simplicity in comparison to creating a retail game. The developers stated that practically any platform game may have had some influence on 'Splosion Man, though they credited Earthworm Jim for his sense of humor and Sonic the Hedgehog when comparing a sense of speed. The concept art was drawn by retired concept artist Jerome Crackershack, which was picked up by Dave Leung. Leung later became the art lead and, in the words of 'Splosion Man director James Bear, "ran with [it] and brought [it] to life". Bear explained that the game's humor was not a big part of the pre-development process, and that they "just wanted to make an awesome game". The "Way of the Coward" mode, which allowed players to skip a stage by dying enough times in a row, was added so players could experience the whole game. Using this mode also garbs the protagonist with a pink tutu.

'Splosion Man is the first title to provide Avatar Awards to players of the game. Twisted Pixel has no plans to port 'Splosion Man to other consoles. While no traditional downloadable content was released for the game, two exclusive levels were later included in Twisted Pixel's Comic Jumper: The Adventures of Captain Smiley and can be unlocked through gameplay.

== Reception ==
Reception

Aggregate score
| Aggregator | Score |
|---|---|
| Metacritic | 84/100 |

Review scores
| Publication | Score |
|---|---|
| The A.V. Club | B+ |
| Destructoid | 9/10 |
| Edge | 8/10 |
| Eurogamer | 7/10 |
| GamePro | 4.5/5 |
| GameRevolution | A− |
| GameSpot | 8/10 |
| GameSpy | 4.5/5 |
| GameTrailers | 8.7/10 |
| GameZone | 8.7/10 |
| Giant Bomb | 4/5 |
| IGN | 9/10 |
| Official Xbox Magazine (US) | 8/10 |
| Retro Gamer | 86% |
| Teletext GameCentral | 7/10 |

'Splosion Man received "generally favorable" reviews according to the review aggregator website Metacritic, scoring 84 per cent based on 52 critic reviews. Brett Todd of GameSpot called 'Splosion Man "one of the most original platformers to come down the road in a while", and IGN reviewer Daemon Hatfield said it "upped the ante" from Twisted Pixel's previous game, The Maw.

Reviewers generally praised the game's humor, simplicity, and inexpensive price. Brett Todd of GameSpot called 'Splosion Man "one of the most original platformers to come down the road in a while", adding the price was "very reasonable". Hatfield also lauded the game's humor, gameplay and personality, adding "not a moment goes by without seeing something new and exciting". The level design, overall gameplay length and personality were high points for Eduardo Reboucas of Game Revolution, who continued with stating that the game was "easy to play, hard to master". Eurogamer's Dan Whitehead enjoyed the game overall, but occasional repetitive level design and some minor control issues. GamesRadar+'s Nathan Meunier enjoyed the game overall, also citing the comical musical score, but shared the feeling that the level design becomes repetitive.

411Mania gave it a favorable review and said: "For 800 Microsoft Points, this game offers a lot of fun and enjoyment, both by yourself and with friends. Whether it is trying to beat levels, find hidden cakes or beat the par time, there is a lot to do in this game. For such a simplistic game on the surface, there is a lot to be had here, and this is one of the hidden gems in the Summer of Arcade games. Definitely try this game, but this game is really worth the price of admission." The A.V. Club's Samantha Nelson gave it a B+ and wrote: "Unlike many platformers that are packed with button-pressing combos to master, 'Splosion Man revels in simplicity. As the game manual expressly states, every button on your controller makes you do the same thing: 'splode'." In contrast, Teletext GameCentral's Roger Hargreaves gave it seven out of ten, saying that, "Like any good firework[s] display this fun platformer retains its charm even after the novelty runs out."

It was voted by the Xbox Live community as the Best Original Xbox Live Arcade Game of 2009. In August 2009 Shadow Complex developer Donald Mustard praised the quality of recent downloadable games, specifically mentioning 'Splosion Man for how unique it and others are. In a September 2010 ranking, IGN listed 'Splosion Man eleventh in their top twenty-five Xbox Live Arcade titles of all time. By October 2011, that rank had dropped to fifteenth.

=== Sales ===
'Splosion Man was a commercial success, along with the four other Summer of Arcade titles. A Microsoft Australia representative stated that all five of these titles would have made the top 10 best-selling games in Australia in their first week of release. It launched as the second best-selling game in the week of July 20, 2009, with over 70,000 players. It ranked third in the following week. It was the fifth best-selling Xbox Live Arcade title during the week of August 10, 2009. It later appeared at number eight during the week of August 24. The game placed thirteenth overall 2009 sales. As of January 2011, 'Splosion Man had sold over 390,000 units. As of year-end 2011 it had moved to over 487,000 units.

== Legacy ==
=== Sequel ===
Twisted Pixel Games developed a sequel to 'Splosion Man titled Ms. Splosion Man. The female version of 'Splosion Man was selected, according to Josh Bear of Twisted Pixel Games, as part of an underlying homage to Ms. Pac-Man. It was Bear's opinion that Ms. Pac-Man was an improvement on Pac-Man and Ms. Splosion Man is likewise meant to be an advancement on 'Splosion Man. It was released on July 13, 2011.

=== Controversy ===
In January 2011, Capcom released an iOS game entitled MaXplosion, which featured several similarities to 'Splosion Man, including the same game mechanics. Twisted Pixel programmer Mike Henry said he believed the game to be "a complete theft". Twisted Pixel CEO Michael Wilford also pointed out that Twisted Pixel Games had once pitched 'Splosion Man to Capcom, but the game was rejected. Wilford later explained that the pitch to Capcom was presented to the US branch of the company, and that the UK division handles all mobile game development. He stated that it was unlikely that Capcom US passed on the game pitch to Capcom UK. Twisted Pixel did not plan to take legal action against Capcom. Capcom responded to the allegations saying that the game was developed independently by Capcom Mobile, a different division from the one that had discussions with Twisted Pixel, and the game's similarities to 'Splosion Man was a coincidence. Twisted Pixel included a hidden jab towards Capcom in the game's sequel, Ms. Splosion Man. Upon finding a secret area the character Star from Comic Jumper: The Adventures of Captain Smiley notices similarities to other games, calling it "a ripoff". The character then states "Who made this game? Capcom?"
