= LocoCycle =

2013 video game

- Developer: Twisted Pixel Games
- Publisher: Microsoft Studios
- Director: Josh Bear
- Producer: William Muehl
- Designer: Sean Riley
- Artist: David Leung
- Writers: Edward Kuehnel; Matthew Entin; Josh Bear
- Composer: Chainsaw
- Engine: Beard
- Platforms: Microsoft Windows; Xbox 360; Xbox One
- Release: Xbox One; November 22, 2013; Windows, Xbox 360; February 14, 2014
- Genres: Action, adventure, vehicular combat
- Modes: Single-player, multiplayer

LocoCycle is an action-adventure beat-'em-up video game developed by Twisted Pixel Games and published by Microsoft Studios. Originally announced as an Xbox Live Arcade title at E3 2012, LocoCycle was released in November 2013 for Xbox One in its digital storefronts as a launch title that coincided with the release of the Xbox One, and on February 14, 2014 for Microsoft Windows and Xbox 360. The Xbox One version was localized for Japan for release on September 4, 2014.

== Gameplay ==
LocoCycle is an action-adventure beat-'em-up game where players control the main character, a sentient combat motorcycle named I.R.I.S., to fight against a military weapons company seeking to destroy her. I.R.I.S. can attack enemies while driving, use her artillery for long-range damage, and can even fight against airborne enemies. In the driving portions, I.R.I.S. can use a turbo boost for greater speed. I.R.I.S. has a health bar that will diminish through damage from enemies and hitting obstacles. The player fails the current mission if I.R.I.S.' health is fully depleted.

During and at the end of each level, the player is awarded with a letter rank for their combos, long-range attack accuracy, and passing each level with little damage. These will be traded into credits that can be used to purchase upgrades for I.R.I.S., such as increasing her attack power, amplifying the power of her combos, increasing her boost capacity, and other various effects.

In some mid-level moments, the player will have to complete special missions. Also, I.R.I.S. will occasionally break down, and the player will have to perform a series of quick time events as Pablo in order to repair her. Additionally, the player will also perform other QTEs to avoid or dodge hazards.

== Plot ==
At an unveiling event in the jungles of Nicaragua, the executive director of military arms company Big Arms introduces to an audience of military leaders their most revolutionary inventions: I.R.I.S. and S.P.I.K.E., two artificially intelligent combat motorcycles with a limitless amount of modifications. As the party goes on, two guards move the bikes to the venue to be sold, but as one of them leaves for a phone call, I.R.I.S. is struck by lightning, causing the bike to gain sentience, but scrambling her circuitry in the process.

In a garage, mechanic Pablo is ordered to give I.R.I.S. a maintenance check to be in top shape for the showroom. As he gets to work, the newly self-aware I.R.I.S. discovers via a commercial the annual Freedom Rally in Scottsburg, Indiana. At the same time, Pablo's pant leg gets stuck in I.R.I.S.' chassis, literally dragging him along as the bike escapes the facility. Learning of I.R.I.S.' escape, Big Arms sends S.P.I.K.E. to intercept her.

I.R.I.S. travels through the Americas, fighting off Big Arms' numerous attempts to capture her, while the Spanish-speaking Pablo unsuccessfully attempts to negotiate with I.R.I.S. to release him, due to her freak accident malfunctioning her language translator. Meanwhile, S.P.I.K.E. also gains a human companion of his own to match I.R.I.S. in combat by borrowing a vacationing woman named Ella Mae. The two bikes run into each other repeatedly and eventually battle in a decisive showdown, with I.R.I.S. seemingly destroying S.P.I.K.E.

Arriving at the Freedom Rally, an overjoyed I.R.I.S. discovers a sinister plot by Holt Ryebach, one of the guests at the unveiling party, who plans to use mass-produced I.R.I.S. and S.P.I.K.E. models, as well as a legion of missiles, to attack a biker club in Janesville, Wisconsin with a bomb strike, as revenge for refusing to join them. His army of bikers also takes the attending model, Miss Scottsburg, hostage when she protests against this. I.R.I.S. intercepts the missiles and shoots them down, with help from S.P.I.K.E., who had survived his defeat to I.R.I.S., and they defeat Holt, while Pablo hurriedly disarms the last missile, saving Janesville.

While the local Janesville bike club hails her and Pablo heroes, I.R.I.S. finally gets him unstuck from her. They later part ways at a gas station as Pablo shares a heartfelt goodbye with the motorcycle. S.P.I.K.E. also returns Ella Mae to her motor home, where she is greeted by her grandchildren, and decides to travel the country for sightseeing.

== Reception ==
Reception

Aggregate score
Aggregator	Score		
Aggregator	PC	Xbox 360	Xbox One
Metacritic	57/100	35/100	48/100

Review scores
Publication	Score		
Publication	PC	Xbox 360	Xbox One
Destructoid	N/A	N/A	7/10
Edge	N/A	N/A	2/10
Electronic Gaming Monthly	N/A	N/A	3/10
Eurogamer	N/A	N/A	4/10
Game Informer	N/A	N/A	7/10
GameSpot	N/A	N/A	6/10
GameTrailers	N/A	N/A	4.2/10
GameZone	N/A	N/A	7/10
IGN	N/A	N/A	6.4/10
Joystiq	N/A	N/A	1.5/5
Official Xbox Magazine (US)	N/A	N/A	7.5/10
PC Gamer (UK)	46%	N/A	N/A
Polygon	N/A	N/A	4/10
Shacknews	N/A	N/A	3/10
The Escapist	N/A	N/A	3/5
Metro	N/A	N/A	2/10

The PC version of LocoCycle received "mixed" reviews, while the Xbox 360 and Xbox One versions received "generally unfavorable reviews", according to the review aggregation website Metacritic. GameZone's Mike Splechta said of the Xbox One version: "While LocoCycle is the worst looking game of the Xbox One launch, it's saved thanks to its over the top and fun gameplay".

== See also ==
- Carmageddon
- Road Rash
- Tron
