= Ms. Splosion Man =

2011 video game

- Xbox Live Arcade box art
- Developer: Twisted Pixel Games
- Publishers: Microsoft Studios; Twisted Pixel Games (Switch)
- Engine: Beard
- Platforms: Xbox Live Arcade; Windows iOS; Windows Phone Nintendo Switch
- Release: XBLA; July 13, 2011 iOS; March 28, 2013; Windows, Windows Phone; April 3, 2013; Switch; November 22, 2018
- Genre: Platform
- Modes: Single-player, multiplayer

Ms. Splosion Man is a platform game developed by Twisted Pixel Games, and was released on Xbox 360 on July 13, 2011, as well as Windows Phone. It is the sequel to 2009's 'Splosion Man. The game takes place directly after 'Splosion Man. In the celebration of 'Splosion Man's capture, the scientists behind his creation accidentally create Ms. Splosion Man. The gameplay draws most of its core elements from its predecessor, but adds new gameplay mechanics such as jump pads and riding on rails.

The game was generally very well received by critics. Aggregate websites GameRankings and Metacritic report scores in the 85% range. Individual scores ranged from a 60% approval to multiple perfect scores. Critics generally felt that the game was a great expansion and improvement over the original. The game's humor was also lauded. Criticisms included long load times between levels and increased difficulty over the original 'Splosion Man. The game sold over 70,000 units as of year-end 2011.

Ms. Splosion Man was released on November 22, 2018, for Nintendo Switch.

== Gameplay ==
Ms. Splosion Man is the sequel to the 2009 video game 'Splosion Man. For the first time in the series the title character can venture outside the laboratory where they were created.

Ms. Splosion Man shares much of the same gameplay with its predecessor, 'Splosion Man. The character is made entirely of explosive material. The aim of the game is to "splode" through a series of levels consisting of puzzles, traps, and enemies. A splode is effectively a jump, and can also be used to kill enemies, such as scientists and robots, demolish walls, detonate explosive barrels or trigger other effects.

Various new gameplay elements have been added to Ms. Splosion Man, including energy rails on which the protagonist can ride, and cannons that toss her in specific directions, some of which can be controlled by the player. The game features both single-player and multiplayer cooperative campaigns, each including levels set in the outside world. Also new to the game is a mode known as 2 Girls 1 Controller, which enables a single player to play through the cooperative campaign controlling both Ms. Splosion Man and 'Splosion Man simultaneously.

In response to player feedback about the first game's difficulty, Ms. Splosion Man contains an overworld that clearly marks each level's difficulty and allows players to skip more difficult levels if they so choose. Twisted Pixel CEO Michael Wilford stated that the overworld map was inspired by Super Mario World, and that it contains similar secrets such as secret exits.

== Synopsis ==
Following from where 'Splosion Man left off, 'Splosion Man is finally captured by Big Science. As the scientists celebrate in their lab, one scientist inadvertently spills a bottle of liquid onto some electrical wiring. This causes a surge of energy to flow to a nearby experimentation platform where a yellow bow is falling. As the bow touches the platform the surge of energy is released, and Ms. Splosion Man is created. For the first time in the series the character will escape the fictional Big Science facilities and venture out into the world.

== Development ==
Ms. Splosion Man was announced on December 3, 2010, via a press release and teaser trailer. Josh Bear of Twisted Pixel Games said: "I think with Splosion Man a follow up was something we really wanted to do, and that is why you never saw DLC for that game. We could have churned out new levels, but we wouldn't have had the time to add in new gameplay puzzles or cool new character stuff. But we didn't just want to do Splosion Man 2, it had to be something a little more interesting. That is why we decided to do MSM". The team chose a female variation on 'Splosion Man as an homage to Ms. Pac-Man, which, according to Bear, the game pays homage to. Bear continued by explaining that as Ms. Pac-Man was an improvement on Pac-Man so Ms. Splosion Man is meant to be an advancement on 'Splosion Man. He stated the goal was to ensure that the game "stands out on its own as a much bigger and better game overall, not to be confused as an over-priced DLC pack which I think a lot of retail "sequels" can be a lot of the time". The game runs on Twisted Pixel's BEARD engine, which has been used to power all of their titles.

Twisted Pixel stated that their desire was to keep the game character driven. CEO Micheal Wilford said: "Everything is character based. The thing that matters to us is that hopefully there's a memorable character that makes you laugh, cause no one makes games like that anymore". One of the ways in which they do this is with pop culture references. For example, if the controller is kept idle long enough Ms. Splosion Man will do the Macarena, a popular dance from the 1990s. Additionally the character will quote movies and other references as the player navigates through levels.

Ms. Splosion Man ran a beta testing session in June 2011. Ten thousand signup slots opened to players on May 24. The beta slots filled in three days. Additional codes were distributed during E3 2011 on the show floor and via the official Twisted Pixel Games Twitter account as well as programmer Mike Henry's Twitter account. The game was shown at PAX East 2011 as well as E3. The game was released on July 13, 2011, nearly two years after 'Splosion Man. Ms. Splosion Man was later released for Steam, Games for Windows – Live, iOS and Windows Phone.

== Reception ==
Reception

Aggregate scores
| Aggregator | Score |
|---|---|
| GameRankings | 83.92% |
| Metacritic | 82/100 |

Review scores
| Publication | Score |
|---|---|
| 1Up.com | A |
| Destructoid | 9.5/10 |
| GamePro | 5/5 |
| GameSpot | 8.5 |
| GameTrailers | 8.5 |
| Giant Bomb | 3/5 |
| IGN | 9/10 |
| Joystiq | 5/5 |
| Official Xbox Magazine (US) | 9/10 |

Ms. Splosion Man received generally strong reviews, some with critical acclaim. Aggregate scores were strong, with Metacritic reporting 82/100. GameRankings reports a similar aggregate score of 83.92%. Individual scores ranged from a 60% approval to a perfect score. The lowest score came from Giant Bomb's Brad Shoemaker who gave the game 3/5 stars. It sold over 70,000 units in its first calendar year. Multiple critics gave the game a perfect score, including Richard Mitchell of Joystiq, Ray Barnholt of 1UP.com, and Terry Terrones of GamePro.

Richard Mitchell of Joystiq stated that Twisted Pixel Games put in a lot of love into this sequel that is packed with new mechanics, level designs and he stated it was his favorite ending of a video game. He stated that "Ms. Splosion Man excels over its predecessor in every way". Daemon Hatfield of IGN also gave the game high marks. He stated in the review that the game was "another excellent, thrilling platformer from the insane team at Twisted Pixel". He added that the game was much more challenging than the first installment, but that it was also more creative, adding new gameplay elements and spots of humor. Hatfield said "there is more creativity packed into one Ms. Splosion Man level than many other games can muster in their entirety".

1UP.com's Ray Barnholt awarded the title an A rating and praised the single and multiplayer modes. Nick Chester of Destructoid called it a step up from 'Splosion Man. He noted that fans of the first will enjoy the game: "If you enjoyed the developer's first incendiary platformer, you've got no excuse not to go pink for Ms. Splosion Man". Official Xbox Magazine's Tyler Cocke praised the wonderful levels, excellent humor and charm but criticized the long load times between levels and menus. Terry Terrones of GamePro praised the vast amount of content for the asking price. He stated it had "a ton of great content to choose from, from concept art to videos and more".

GameSpot's Carolyn Petit lauded the game's level design and cooperative mode. She felt it had many funny moments and extras, as well as great replay value. She criticized some of the visuals and puzzles that hinder some moments. Brad Shoemaker from Giant Bomb expressed some disappointment in the game: "Given all the improvements and additions and craziness, though, it's a little disappointing that I didn't enjoy playing this sequel as much as the first one". His criticisms included the amount of time it takes for Ms. Splosion Man to reach her full speed, and the lack of air control. In addition, he felt the game required a certain amount of "guesswork" to get through some levels, and that players have been put off by the trial-and-error segments present within the game.

During the 15th Annual Interactive Achievement Awards, the Academy of Interactive Arts & Sciences nominated Ms. Splosion Man for "Downloadable Game of the Year".
