= Twisted Pixel Games =

American video game developer

Twisted Pixel Games, LLC
- Type: Subsidiary
- Industry: Video games
- Founded: 2006; 20 years ago
- Defunct: January 13, 2026
- Fate: Dissolved
- Headquarters: Austin, Texas, U.S.
- Key people: Josh Bear, CCO; Bill Muehl, CEO; Frank Wilson, CTO
- Products: The Maw 'Splosion Man; Comic Jumper; Ms. Splosion Man; The Gunstringer; Wilson's Heart
- Number of employees: 30
- Parent: Microsoft Studios (2011–2015); Oculus Studios (2021-2026)
- Website: twistedpixelgames.com

Twisted Pixel Games, LLC was an American video game developer based in Austin, Texas. Originally a contractor, Twisted Pixel released games based on its own intellectual properties such as The Maw and 'Splosion Man. The company used its own proprietary engine, known as Beard, to power its games. On October 12, 2011, it was announced that Twisted Pixel had become part of Microsoft Studios. However, Twisted Pixel separated from Microsoft, and became an independent company again on September 30, 2015. In November 2021, the company was acquired by Meta Platforms and became a subsidiary of Oculus Studios. As a result of layoffs at Reality Labs (under which Oculus Studios is placed), Twisted Pixel was closed in January 2026.

== History ==
Twisted Pixel Games was founded in 2006 by former High Voltage Software members Michael Wilford, Frank Wilson and Josh Bear. The company first performed contract work for Midway Games, providing engineering work for NBA Ballers: Chosen One and Blitz: The League II. In 2008, Twisted Pixel announced that its focus had changed to digitally distributed games based on its own new intellectual properties. That year, the company moved from Madison, Indiana to Austin, Texas. According to Wilford, who was CEO at the time, the move was to "tap into a broader talent pool."

Initially, Twisted Pixel targeted WiiWare as its service of choice. Speaking of the 2005 planned state of the service, Wilford said, "Back then, WiiWare was planned to be more like Xbox Live Arcade." He noted the original plans for the service would require companies to submit games to Nintendo for approval, similar to the submission process Microsoft uses for Xbox Live Arcade. Early discussions with Microsoft were not positive, but Wilford stated that Nintendo was eager to work with them. "Twisted Pixel was the first company to get a green light for WiiWare." Nintendo later changed its WiiWare model to one that required no submission process. Twisted Pixel opted not to use the service and continued talks with Microsoft. In 2007, Wilford met with David Every, the portfolio planner for Xbox Live Arcade at that time. Twisted Pixel pitched multiple games, including The Maw, which became its first Xbox Live Arcade title. It was released on January 21, 2009.

In December 2008, Twisted Pixel began production on its next title, then began development in January 2009. On April 1, 2009, the title was revealed as 'Splosion Man, a platform game that would be released on July 22 that year. At PAX on September 4, 2009, Twisted Pixel revealed its third title, Comic Jumper: The Adventures of Captain Smiley, which would be released on October 6, 2010.

On December 3, 2010, Twisted Pixel announced Ms. Splosion Man, a sequel to 'Splosion Man. It was released on July 13, 2011.

On February 1, 2011, the company revealed its fifth original game, The Gunstringer, a third person shooter designed for use with the Xbox 360 Kinect peripheral. The game was originally intended to be the first Xbox Live Arcade game to be featured as a Kinect title but instead became a retail release. It was released in September 13, 2011.

Almost exactly one month after The Gunstringer's release, on October 11, Microsoft Studios announced that it had acquired Twisted Pixel for an undisclosed price. Almost four years later, on September 30, 2015, Twisted Pixel announced that it had split from Microsoft and became an independent studio again.

Its games have been generally well-received by critics, and collectively have won several awards. The Maw won the 2008 Audience Choice award at PAX10, and was a finalist at the Independent Games Festival 2009. 'Splosion Man was voted by the Xbox Live community as the Best Original Xbox Live Arcade Game of 2009. In a September 2010 ranking, IGN listed it eleventh in its top twenty-five Xbox Live Arcade titles of all time. It also received several Best of E3 awards in 2009. Captain Smiley, the lead character in Comic Jumper, received the Best New Character award from Official Xbox Magazine in 2010.

On November 14, 2018, it was announced that Ms. Splosion Man would be launching on the Nintendo Switch on November 22.

On December 5, 2021, the website was updated to announce some upcoming changes. Through legal documents from the Federal Trade Commission, it became public that Twisted Pixel was acquired by Meta in November 2021.

On June 6, 2025, it was announced during Summer Game Fest that Twisted Pixel was developing a VR game based on the Marvel Comics antihero Deadpool. The game, Marvel's Deadpool VR, was released on Meta Quest 3 and Meta Quest 3S in July 4, 2025.

On January 13, 2026, Twisted Pixel was one of three studios shut down as a result of layoffs at Meta's Reality Labs, along with Sanzaru Games and Armature Studio.

== Technology ==
All of Twisted Pixel's games are powered by Beard, a proprietary engine to "self-proclaim" compete with Epic Games' Unreal Engine, just for fun. Content was developed with the company's proprietary Razor editor in conjunction with RAD Game Tools' Granny 3D animation toolset. Razor can be adapted to develop in 3D or 2.5D configurations. Games were scripted using Lua, which allows the developers to share code between titles.

== Games developed ==
Year	Title	Platform(s)	Genre
2009	The Maw	Microsoft Windows, Xbox 360	Action-adventure
2009	'Splosion Man	Xbox 360	Action, platform
2010	Comic Jumper: The Adventures of Captain Smiley	Xbox 360	Side-scroller, beat 'em up
2011	Ms. Splosion Man	Microsoft Windows, Nintendo Switch, Xbox 360	Platform
2011	The Gunstringer	Xbox 360	Third-person shooter, rail shooter
2011	The Wavy Tube Man Chronicles	Xbox 360, Microsoft Windows	First-person shooter, rail shooter
2013	LocoCycle	Microsoft Windows, Xbox 360, Xbox One	Racing, vehicular combat
2017	Wilson's Heart	Oculus Rift	Horror, adventure
2018	B-Team	Oculus Go	Action, adventure
2019	Defector	Oculus Rift	First-person shooter
2019	Path of the Warrior	Oculus Rift	Beat'em up
2025	Marvel's Deadpool VR	Meta Quest 3, Meta Quest 3S	Action-adventure
