= Wilson's Heart (video game) =

2017 video game

- Developer: Twisted Pixel Games
- Publisher: Oculus
- Director: Josh Bear
- Producer: William Muehl
- Designer: Sean Conway
- Artist: David Leung
- Writers: Josh Bear; Michael Anthony Steele
- Composer: Christopher Young
- Platform: Windows
- Release: April 25, 2017
- Genre: Adventure game
- Mode: Single-player

Wilson's Heart is a virtual reality horror adventure video game by Twisted Pixel Games, released on April 25, 2017. The game is compatible with the Oculus Rift virtual reality platform.

== Gameplay ==
Players can manipulate objects which have a halo with their motion controllers, depicted by hands in-game. They can also teleport to locations which are depicted by a ghostly outline.

Wilson's Heart is a virtual reality horror adventure played in the first person perspective and in black and white. The player must use motion controllers to interact with objects in the game world and to teleport between certain, predetermined places in the world which are indicated by ghostly images of the player character. The player can open doors and drawers, pick up and manipulate certain objects and combine certain objects. The game contains a rudimentary inventory system which allows the player to store certain objects. The game will then present the objects to the player automatically when they can be used.

During the game, the player obtains several abilities which allow them to manipulate objects from a distance: they can turn on lamps, draw metallic objects to them using magnetism and use a throwing weapon which automatically returns to them after usage.

Several times during the game the player is attacked by enemies and must fight them. Each fight consists of the player repeating a certain pattern of action to defend from the enemy's attack and then attacking themselves, e.g. blocking punches with their arms and then punching the enemy when he is exhausted.

== Plot ==
Robert Wilson (Peter Weller), a middle aged man, awakes in a seemingly abandoned, damaged hospital wearing nothing but a hospital gown. While stumbling through the hospital looking for help, he encounters a living murderous teddy bear and the body of a Dr. Harcourt, who seemed to be an important figure in the hospital. Then Wilson finds a book which seems to contain depictions of supernatural phenomena. He then encounters a group of survivors: Bela Blasco (Alfred Molina), who claims to be a surgeon in the hospital; Elsa Wolcott (Rosario Dawson), a young woman; Kurt Mosby (Michael B. Jordan), who claims to be a visitor in the hospital; and Lucy Holmes, a prepubescent 9 year old girl. Elsa explains that Dr. Harcourt was researching supernatural phenomena and the book contains the result of his research. Bela then notices that Wilson has in his chest, in place of his heart, a strange orb containing moving parts. The group then surmises that the orb must have something to do with the strange phenomena in the hospital and that the book could help fight those phenomena and return Wilson's heart to him. Unfortunately, several pages of the book are missing, having been torn recently.

Shortly after, Wilson loses contact to the others by Shadow Beings and is on his own again. But he notices that he can take the device out of his chest and perform tasks with it, like turning on failing light sources. He also finds more and more missing pages from the book and notices that the more pages he finds, the more tasks his orb is able to perform.

He meets the group again later but shortly after loses contact again. When he later meets Kurt again, Kurt admits that he was a patient in the hospital and is a werewolf, before fleeing again. When Wilson meets Elsa again, she is taken away by a large humanoid monster (That resembles that of Frankenstein's Monster). When Wilson meets Lucy again, he realizes, to his utter shock, that she is a vampire when she murders and drinks the blood of a hospital orderly. She wants the book to no longer look like a young girl, Wilson manages to chase her away.

After stumbling through the hospital and encountering and defeating several creatures like a tentacle monster, the teddy bear, a zombie soldier, a human-fly hybrid, Mutant Fishmen and animated wooden dummies, Wilson is knocked out by the humanoid monster which took away Elsa earlier and wakes up shackled in a large laboratory. There he encounters Elsa who explains that she was the wife and scientific partner of Dr. Harcourt, and that the humanoid monster is in fact her young son named Andy, whose original body had been irreparably damaged by an accident for which Dr. Harcourt was responsible. She had put Andy's brain in a monstrous body to preserve it and now needs Wilson's orb as a new power source for his body, and the book to perform a procedure which will install the orb in Andy's body.

While she is preparing the procedure, Kurt sneaks into the laboratory and tries to free Wilson, but he is prevented from doing so by the full moon, which appears in the window and transforms him into his werewolf form, and he is attacked by Andy. While the two are fighting, Bela sneaks in and tries to free Wilson, just when Lucy in vampire-form flies in. Andy defeats and incapacitates Kurt in werewolf-form and then fights with Lucy, who in turn defeats and incapacitates Andy, just as Bela manages to free Wilson. Wilson manages to stake and kill Lucy before she can bite him. He then manages to reach the book and burn it, just when Andy wakes up. In the chaos, Wilson manages to give Andy an electric shock which overloads his brain, leading him to throw Elsa out of the window. Wilson then manages to stun Andy and puts his orb inside his brain, where it electrocutes Andy.

Later Wilson wakes up in the restored hospital, his heart having been implanted back into his chest. He talks to Bela, who says that the orb and Kurt are missing and that Elsa and Andy's brain have died. Wilson explains that he had been in the hospital to donate his heart to his little brother, who has a family. He makes Bela promise that his brother will never know who had donated the heart.

The game ends with Wilson breathing in the narcotic for the heart transplant operation and falling unconscious.

A post-credits scene shows Kurt meeting a mysterious figure who seems to be part of a group who fights supernatural beings. Kurt hands over the orb to the figure, and requests as a price that the person help him lose his lycanthropy.

== Reception ==
Reception

Aggregate score
Aggregator	Score
Metacritic	(PC) 79/100

Review scores
Publication	Score
Destructoid	9/10
Game Informer	6.75/10
Polygon	8.5/10
PC World	4/5
Road to VR	7/10

Wilson's Heart received "generally favorable" reviews from critics, according to the review aggregation website Metacritic. Reviewers commended the black-and-white graphics, campy horror atmosphere and voice acting, but they criticized the trivial puzzles, limited and arbitrary interactivity, illogical story and repetitive and frustrating fight sequences.

The game was nominated for "Best VR Game" in Destructoid's Game of the Year Awards 2017.

=== Accolades ===
Year	Award	Category	Result	Ref.
2016	Game Critics Awards	Best VR Game	Nominated	
2016	Gamescom 2016	Best Virtual Reality Game	Won	
2017	Golden Joystick Awards	Best VR Game	Nominated	
2018	New York Game Awards 2018	Coney Island Dreamland Award for Best Virtual Reality Game	Nominated	
2018	21st Annual D.I.C.E. Awards	Immersive Reality Game of the Year	Nominated	
2018	21st Annual D.I.C.E. Awards	Immersive Reality Technical Achievement	Nominated	
