= Club Penguin =

Massively multiplayer online game (2005–2017)

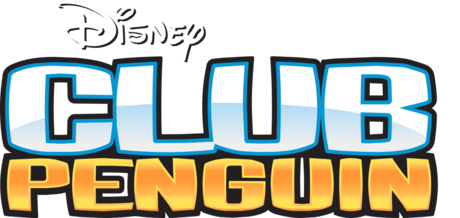
- Final logo, used from 2012 to 2017
- Developer: New Horizon Interactive; RocketSnail Games; Disney Interactive Studios
- Type: Massively multiplayer online game
- Launched: October 24, 2005; 21 years ago
- Discontinued: March 30, 2017; 9 years ago
- Platform: Online (Adobe Flash)
- Status: Discontinued and replaced by Club Penguin Island (March 30, 2017)
- Website: Club Penguin website at the Wayback Machine (archived February 25, 2017)

Club Penguin was a massively multiplayer online game (MMO) that ran from 2005 to 2017. The game featured a virtual world that included a wide range of online games and activities. It was created by New Horizon Interactive (now known as Disney Canada Inc.). Players used cartoon penguin avatars and played in an Antarctic-themed open world. After beta-testing, Club Penguin was available for the general public on October 24, 2005. It expanded into a large online community, such that by late 2007, Club Penguin reported that there were more than 30 million user accounts. In July 2013, Club Penguin had more than 200 million registered user accounts.

While free memberships were available, revenue was predominantly raised through paid memberships, which allowed players to access a range of additional features, such as the ability to purchase virtual clothing, furniture, and in-game pets called "Puffles" for their penguins through the usage of in-game currency. The success of Club Penguin led to New Horizon being purchased by the Walt Disney Company in August 2007 for the sum of 350 million U.S. dollars, with an additional 350 million dollars in bonuses if specific targets were met by 2009.

The game was specifically designed for children aged 6 to 14; however, users of any age were allowed to play. Consequently a major focus of the developers was on child safety, with several features facilitating this, including offering an "Ultimate Safe Chat" mode whereby users selected their comments from a menu, filtering that prevented swearing and the revelation of personal information, and using moderators who patrolled the game.

Club Penguin shut down its servers on March 30, 2017 following an announcement on January 30, 2017; the game was replaced by Club Penguin Island, which itself was discontinued the next year. Since being shut down, the original game has been hosted and recreated on a number of private servers using downloaded SWF files from the game's old website. Many of the private servers were shut down around May 15, 2020, after Digital Millennium Copyright Act filings by the Walt Disney Company were sent on May 13, 2020. One of the most notable private servers, Club Penguin Rewritten, had launched on February 12, 2017, and accumulated an online community of more than 11 million users among the consequences and restrictions from the COVID-19 pandemic and its lockdowns. Rewritten was shut down on April 13, 2022, by the City of London Police in compliance with a copyright investigation request by Disney.

== Plot and gameplay ==
Club Penguin was divided into various rooms and distinct areas. Illustrator Chris Hendricks designed many of the first environments. Each player was provided with an igloo for a home. Members had the option of opening their igloo so other penguins could access it via the map, under "Member Igloos." Members could also purchase larger igloos and decorate their igloos with items bought with virtual coins earned by playing mini-games. At least one party per month was held on Club Penguin. In most cases, a free clothing item was available, both for paid members and free users. Some parties also provided member-only rooms which only paid members could access. Some major Club Penguin parties were its annual Halloween, Winter Holiday, and April Fools parties. Following Disney's acquisition of the game, various parties were held themed around properties the company owned, such as Marvel and Star Wars.

During parties, the game would be visited by special penguin mascots, controlled by employees, who would grant items if encountered in-game. Mascots included characters such as secret agent Gary the Gadget Guy, journalist Aunt Arctic, and pirate Rockhopper.

== History and development ==
=== Predecessors (2000–2004) ===
The first seeds of what would become Club Penguin began as a Flash 4 web-based game called Snow Blasters that developer Lance Priebe had been developing in his spare time in July 2000. Priebe's attention was brought to penguins after he "happened to glance at a Far Side cartoon featuring penguins that was sitting on his desk." The project was never finished, and instead morphed into Experimental Penguins. Experimental Penguins was released through Priebe's company of employment, the Kelowna, British Columbia, Canada-based online game and comic developer RocketSnail Games, in July 2000, though it ultimately went offline the following year. It was used as the inspiration for Penguin Chat (also known as Penguin Chat 1), a similar game which was released shortly after Experimental Penguins' removal. Released January 2003, Penguin Football Chat (also known as Penguin Chat 2) was the second attempt at a penguin-themed MMORPG, and was created on FLASH 5 and used the same interface as Experimental Penguins. The game contained various minigames; the premiere title of RocketSnail Games was Ballistic Biscuit, a game that would be placed into Experimental Penguins and eventually be adapted into Club Penguin's Hydro Hopper. RocketSnails Games' Mancala Classic would also be placed into the game as Mancala.

Lance Priebe, as well as co-workers Lane Merrifield and Dave Krysko, started to formulate the Club Penguin concept when the trio were unsuccessful in finding "something that had some social components but was safe, and not just marketed as safe" for their own children. Dave Krysko in particular wanted to build a safe social-networking site their kids could enjoy free of advertising. In 2003, Merrifield and Priebe approached their boss, with the idea of creating a spinoff company to develop the new product. The spin-off company would be known as New Horizon Interactive.

=== Early history (2004–2007) ===
Work commenced on the project in 2004, and the team settled on a name in the summer of 2005. The developers used the previous project Penguin Chat 2 – which was still online – as a jumping-off point in the design process, while incorporating concepts and ideas from Experimental Penguins. Penguin Chat's third version was released in March 2005, and was used to test the client and servers of Club Penguin. Variants of Penguin Chat 3 included Crab Chat, Chibi Friends Chat, Goat Chat, Ultra-Chat, and TV Chat. Users from Penguin Chat were invited to beta test Club Penguin in August 2005. The original plan was to release Club Penguin in 2010, but since the team had decided to fast-track the project, the first version of Club Penguin went live on October 24, 2005, and four days later Penguin Chat servers were shut down. While Penguin Chat used ElectroServer, Club Penguin would use SmartFoxServer. The developers financed their start-up entirely with their own credit cards and personal lines of credit, and maintained 100 percent ownership. Club Penguin started with 15,000 users, and by March 2006 that number had reached 1.4 million—a figure which almost doubled by September, when it hit 2.6 million. By the time Club Penguin was two years old, it had reached 3.9 million users, despite lacking a marketing budget. The first mention of the game in The New York Times was in October 2006. The following year, Club Penguin spokesperson Karen Mason explained: "We offer children the training wheels for the kinds of activities they might pursue as they get older."

=== Acquisition by Disney (2007) ===
Although the three Club Penguin co-creators had turned down lucrative advertising offers and venture capital investments in the past, in August 2007, they agreed to sell both Club Penguin and its parent company to Disney for the sum of $350.93 million. In addition, the owners were promised bonuses of up to $350 million if they were able to meet growth targets by 2009. Disney ultimately didn't pay the extra $350 million, as Club Penguin missed both profit goals. At the point when it was purchased by Disney, Club Penguin had 11–12 million accounts, of which 700,000 were paid subscribers, and was generating $40 million in annual revenue. In making the sale, Merrifield has stated that their main focus during negotiations was philosophical, and that the intent was to provide themselves with the needed infrastructure in order to continue to grow. By late 2007, it was claimed that Club Penguin had over 30 million user accounts. In December of that year, The New York Times asserted that the game "attracts seven times more traffic than Second Life." Club Penguin was the 8th top social networking site in April 2008, according to Nielsen.

After Disney's acquisition, Disney Interactive had four MMOs to simultaneously juggle: ToonTown, Pirates of the Caribbean Online, Pixie Hollow, and Club Penguin, with World of Cars set to follow soon. Lane Merrifield assured GlobalToyNews at the time that "it's a lot of worlds to manage, but we have really strong teams." Merrifield's role changed from taking a backseat in daily game design to focusing on overall branding and quality control of the virtual gaming properties. One of his roles was to merge the Club Penguin studio New Horizon Interactive in Kelowna (renamed to Disneyland Studios Canada) with Disneyland Studios LA. Disneyland Studios Canada focused its efforts on one product (with such features as multilingual versions), while Disneyland Studios LA focused on customer products and franchises of a wide selection of games. Merrifield was responsible for cross-pollinating both cultures.

=== Franchising and growth (2007–2015) ===
Since the Disney purchase, Club Penguin continued to grow, becoming part of a larger franchise including video games, books, a television special, an anniversary song, and an app MMO. Disney often used the game as a cross-promotion opportunity when releasing new films such as Frozen, Zootopia, and Star Wars, having special themed events and parties to celebrate their releases. The game forged an ever-growing mythology of characters and plot elements, including: a pirate, a journalist, and a secret agent.

In 2008, the first international office opened in Brighton, England, to personalise the level of moderation and player support. Later international office locations included São Paulo and Buenos Aires. On March 11, 2008, Club Penguin released the Club Penguin Improvement Project. This project allowed players to be part of the testing of new servers, which were put into use in Club Penguin on April 14, 2008. Players had a "clone" of their penguin made to test these new servers for bugs and glitches. The testing was ended on April 4, 2008.

On June 20, 2011, the game's website temporarily crashed after the company let the Club Penguin domain name expire. In September 2011, one of Club Penguin's minigames, Puffle Launch, was released on iOS as an app. Merrifield commented: "Kids are going mobile and have been asking for Club Penguin to go there with them."

In late 2012, Merrifield left Disney Interactive to focus on his family and a new educational product, Freshgrade. Chris Heatherly took Merrifield's former position. The company dropped the words "Online Studios" from its name in 2013. As of July 2013, Club Penguin had over 200 million registered user accounts. In 2013, Club Penguin hired singer and former Club Penguin player Jordan Fisher to record a song entitled It's Your Birthday, to commemorate Club Penguin's 8th anniversary.

=== Decline and discontinuation (2015–2017) ===
In April 2015, it was revealed that Disney Interactive had laid off 28 members of Club Penguin's Kelowna headquarters due to the game's declining popularity. The company's UK office in Brighton was shut down around April 17, 2015. Some employees in the Los Angeles office were also let go. Disney Interactive replied to Castanet on the layoffs: "Disney Interactive continually looks to find ways to create efficiencies and streamline our operations. As part of this ongoing process, we are consolidating a small number of teams and are undergoing a targeted reduction in workforce."

On September 2, 2015, Club Penguin closed down the German and Russian versions of the site. A spin-off mobile app, Puffle Wild, was removed from the App Store and Google Play the same day in order to allow Disney Interactive to focus on Club Penguin. On January 11, 2016, the Sled Racer and SoundStudio apps (the former being an original game and the latter being a port of a game on the website) followed suit. With the closure of Disney Interactive in 2015, Club Penguin side-projects wound down to allow a streamlined effort to focus on the core Club Penguin experience; this involved the layoffs of 30 Disney Studios Canada staff.

On January 30, 2017, Club Penguin announced that the current game would be discontinued on March 29, 2017, to make way for its successor, Club Penguin Island. Membership payments for the original game were no longer accepted as of January 31, 2017, with paid members slated to receive emails about membership and refunds.

It became popular in the final weeks of Club Penguin for users to attempt speedruns to see how fast they could get banned from the game, by creating an account and entering profanity in the chat. The fastest times were under 40 seconds, with a tool-assisted speedrun (TAS) of 29 seconds.

Days before the shut down, Club Penguin announced that on the final day of the game's operation, all users would be given a free membership until the servers were disconnected.

Multiplayer transmissions stopped and, twenty seconds later on March 30, 2017 @ 00:01 PDT (07:01 UTC), Club Penguin's servers were officially shut down. A message appeared on screen for all players, saying "The connection has been lost. Thank you for playing Club Penguin. Waddle on!"

== Design ==
=== Business model ===
Prior to being purchased by Disney, Club Penguin was almost entirely dependent on membership fees to produce a revenue stream. The vast majority of users (90% according to The Washington Post) chose not to pay, instead taking advantage of the free play on offer. Those who chose to pay did so because full (paid) membership was required to access all of the services, such as the ability to purchase virtual clothes for the penguins and buy decorations for igloos, and because peer pressure created a "caste system," separating paid from unpaid members. Advertising, both in-game and on-site, was not incorporated into the system, although some competitors chose to employ it, including: Whyville, which used corporate sponsorship, and Neopets, which incorporated product placements.

An alternative revenue stream came through the development of an online merchandise shop, which opened on the Club Penguin website in August 2006, selling stuffed Puffles and T-shirts. Key chains, gift cards, and more shirts were added on November 7, 2006. In October 2008, a series of plush toys based on characters from Club Penguin, were made available online (both through the Club Penguin store and Disney's online store), and in retail outlets.

As with one of its major rivals, Webkinz, Club Penguin traditionally relied almost entirely on word-of-mouth advertising to increase its membership base.

=== Child safety ===
Club Penguin was designed for the ages of 6–14. Thus, one of the major concerns when designing Club Penguin was how to improve both the safety of participants and the suitability of the game to children. As Lane Merrifield stated, "the decision to build Club Penguin grew out of a desire to create a fun, virtual world that I and the site's other two founders would feel safe letting our own children visit." As a result, Club Penguin maintained a strong focus on child safety, to the point where the security features were described as almost "fastidious" and "reminiscent of an Orwellian dystopia", although it was also argued that this focus might "reassure more parents than it alienate[d]."

The system employed a number of different approaches in an attempt to improve child safety. The key approaches included preventing the use of inappropriate usernames; providing an "Ultimate Safe Chat" mode, which limited players to selecting phrases from a list; using an automatic filter during "Standard Safe Chat" (which allowed users to generate their own messages) and blocked profanity even when users employed "creative" methods to insert it into sentences; filtering seemingly innocuous terms, such as "mom"; and blocking both telephone numbers and email addresses. It also included employing paid moderators; out of 100 staff employed in the company in May 2007, Merrifield estimated that approximately 70 staff were dedicated to policing the game. Developers encouraged players to report inappropriate behavior by promoting users to the Penguin Secret Agency (PSA), which emphasized their shared responsibility in keeping the website safe.

Each game server offered a particular type of chat—the majority allowing either chat mode, but some servers allowed only the "Ultimate Safe Chat" mode. When using "Standard Safe Chat", all comments made by users were filtered. When a comment was blocked, the user who made the comment saw it, but other users were unaware that it was made—suggesting to the "speaker" that they were being ignored, rather than encouraging them to try to find a way around the restriction.

Beyond these primary measures, systems were in place to limit the amount of time spent online, and the site did not feature any advertisements, because, as described by Merrifield, "within two or three clicks, a kid could be on a gambling site or an adult dating site." Nevertheless, after Club Penguin was purchased by Disney, concerns were raised that this state of affairs might change, especially in regard to potential spin-off products, although Disney continued to insist that it believed advertising to be "inappropriate" for a young audience.

Players who used profanity were often punished by an automatic 24-hour ban, although not all vulgar language resulted in an immediate ban. Players found by moderators to have broken Club Penguin rules were punished by a ban lasting "from 24 hours to forever depending on the offense."

=== Education and charity ===
Research shows that the design of virtual worlds, like Club Penguin, provide children with opportunities to develop literacy and communication skills while having a powerful impact on their social relationships and identity formation. One literary practice involved players frequently engaged in semiotic analysis of other player profiles, which was a display of that player's identity within the game. Other literacy and communication practices included the use of the in game postal service and of emoticons, which served to build social cohesion and structure.

Coins for Change was an in-game charity fund-raising event which first appeared in 2007. The fund-raising lasted for approximately two weeks each December during the game's annual "Holiday Party". Players could "donate" their virtual coins to vote for three charitable issues: Kids who were sick, the environment, and kids in developing countries. Players were able to donate in increments of 100, 250, 500, 1,000, 5,000, or 10,000 virtual coins. At the end of the campaign, a set amount of real-world money was divided among each of the causes based on the amount of in-game currency each cause received. At the end of the first campaign, the New Horizon Foundation donated a total of $1 million to the World Wide Fund for Nature, the Elizabeth Glaser Pediatric AIDS Foundation, and Free The Children. In both the 2007 and 2008 campaigns, two-and-a-half million players participated. In 2009, Club Penguin donated $1,000,000 Canadian dollars to charitable projects around the world. In 2010, Club Penguin donated $300,000 towards building safe places, $360,000 towards protecting the Earth, and $340,000 towards providing medical help. Lane Merrifield said: "Our players are always looking for ways to make a difference and help others, and over the past five years they've embraced the opportunity to give through Coins For Change, it was exciting to see kids from 191 countries participate together. In 2011, the amount of money donated was doubled to $2 million, ostensibly in response to an unexpected increase in participation.

== Franchise ==
Disney's franchising of the brand began with its acquisition of Club Penguin in 2007. In addition to the Club Penguin Island video game, the franchise has also included console video games for Nintendo DS and Wii, television specials in the UK, and a series of books.

== Critical reception ==
Club Penguin received mixed reviews. The site was awarded a "kids' privacy seal of approval" from the Better Business Bureau. Similarly, Brian Ward, a Detective Inspector at the Child Abuse Investigation Command in the United Kingdom, stated that it was good for children to experience a restricted system such as Club Penguin before moving into social networking sites, which provide less protection. In terms of simple popularity, the rapid growth of Club Penguin suggested considerable success, although there were signs that this was leveling out. Nielsen figures released in April 2008 indicated that in the previous 12 months, Club Penguin traffic had shrunk by 7%.

=== Concerns ===
==== Encouragement of cheating ====
One of the criticisms expressed by commentators was that the game encouraged consumerism and allowed players to cheat. While Club Penguin did not require members to purchase in-game products with real money (instead relying on a set monthly fee), players were encouraged to earn coins within the game with which to buy virtual products. Furthermore, Club Penguin was full of advertisements for their paid membership that repeatedly encouraged children to subscribe in order to gain access to the full range of activities. These advertisements included notices that certain levels of games and items were reserved for paid members and even included paid members that unwittingly acted as recruiters. Additionally, Club Penguin merchandise was sold through the website and in Disney retail stores that would unlock items and coins in the game. In this way, critics believe that Disney positioned children as economic subjects that became acculturated to shopping as a key cultural practice. Others argue that the use of in-game money possibly helps teach children how to save money, select what to spend it on, improve their abilities at math, and encourage them to "practice safe money-management skills".

In addition, the "competitive culture" that this could create led to concerns about cheating, as children looked for "shortcuts" to improve their standing. It was suggested that this might influence their real-world behavior. To counter this, Club Penguin added guidelines to prevent cheating, and banned players who were caught cheating or who encouraged cheating.

==== Child safety and behavior ====
In spite of the attempts to create a safe space for children in Club Penguin, concerns about safety and behavior still arose within the media. While the language in-game was filtered, discussions outside of Club Penguin were beyond the owner's control, and thus it was stated that third-party Club Penguin forums could become "as bawdy as any other chat". Even within the game, Club Penguin had a unique form of anti-social behavior and cyberbullying that presented as angry emoticons, relentless throwing of snowballs at other players and some messages were able to get through the filtered chat. Also, the "Caste system" between those who had membership and exclusive items and those who lacked full membership (and therefore were unable to own the "coolest" items) could lead to players having a difficult time attracting friends. Furthermore, some researchers were concerned that due to the differing experiences and privileges between paid and non-paid members, children would be exposed to a class system where some would be competing for higher and higher status. Others worried that the display of class and promotion of consumerism within Club Penguin fosters the notion that the accumulation of wealth and possessions are the direct result of one's success and status. Additionally, some critics have noted the presence of strong sexual connotations due to the modeling of romantic relationships and behaviors.

One criticism came from Caitlin Flanagan in The Atlantic Monthly: in relation to the safety procedures, she noted that Club Penguin was "certainly the safest way for unsupervised children to talk to potentially malevolent strangers—but why would you want them to do that in the first place?" While views of the strength of this criticism might vary, the concern was mirrored by Lynsey Kiely in the Sunday Independent, who quoted Karen Mason, Communications Director for Club Penguin, as saying "we cannot guarantee that every person who visits the site is a child."

On August 20, 2013, Disney announced that Toontown Online, Pixie Hollow, and Pirates of the Caribbean Online were closing directly because of Club Penguin and Disney's mobile games. This caused major controversy between Club Penguin and fans of the three games, especially Toontown, where some users had played for more than 12 years (Toontown's alpha test started in August 2001).

== Private servers ==
A Club Penguin private server (CPPS) is an online multiplayer game that uses unlicensed SWF files from Club Penguin, a database, and a server emulator in order to create a similar environment for the game. Many now use these environments in order to play the original game after its discontinuation. CPPS's often contain features that did not exist in the original game, such as custom items and rooms, free membership, etc.

Throughout the official game's existence, various players created private servers of Club Penguin, and in response to its closure, more private servers were created. Club Penguin Rewritten, a popular remake, launched on February 12, 2017. It had reached a million players as of October 12, 2017, before announcing its permanent shutdown on March 4, 2018. Citing community support and funding however, the remake returned a month later on April 27, 2018, along with all existing user accounts, nearly twice as many as Club Penguin had 12 years earlier in December 2006.

During the COVID-19 pandemic, private servers experienced a surge in popularity, with one CPPS platform gaining between 6,000 and 8,000 new players each day. On April 16, 2020, American musician Soccer Mommy collaborated with Club Penguin Rewritten to host a virtual concert for her new album Color Theory. The event had been rescheduled from April 2, 2020, due to higher than expected player counts that overloaded the server.

=== Legal status ===
Since private servers essentially copy materials copyrighted by Disney, there has been much controversy as to whether or not creating and hosting them is legal. Disney and Club Penguin have pursued numerous CPPSes and attempted to have them taken down with DMCA notices.

=== Vulnerabilities ===
Many private servers have become vulnerable to DDOS attacks and database leaks due to insufficient security measures. On January 21, 2018, the login data of over 1.7 million Club Penguin Rewritten users were stolen after a data breach and on July 27, 2019, the private server suffered a second data breach, which exposed the data of an additional 4 million accounts.

=== Shutdown ===
On May 14, 2020, it was announced that all private servers using the Club Penguin brand were given DMCA take-down notices after allegations emerged concerning predation by an administrator of another popular private server, Club Penguin Online. On May 15, 2020, the site was shut down after complying with the DMCA takedown notice by The Walt Disney Company. In a statement, Disney said, "Child safety is a top priority for the Walt Disney Company and we are appalled by the allegations of criminal activity and abhorrent behaviour on this unauthorised website that is illegally using the Club Penguin brand and characters for its own purposes. [...] We continue to enforce our rights against this, and other, unauthorised uses of the Club Penguin game."

Club Penguin Rewritten was shut down on April 13, 2022, by the Police Intellectual Property Crime Unit of the City of London Police, who took control of the website and arrested three people "on suspicion of distributing materials infringing copyright". According to one of the game's administrators, the team had shut down the game and "voluntarily given control over the website to the police" after a request from Disney.

== Awards and nominations ==
Year	Award	Title	Result	Ref.
2008	Web Marketing Association	Entertainment Standard of Excellence	Won	
2008	Web Marketing Association	Game Site Standard of Excellence	Won	
2008	2008 Webby Awards	Youth Category	Nominated	
2009	2009 Webby Awards	Games Category	Won	
2010	Children's BAFTA Award	Kids Vote	Won	
2011	Children's BAFTA Award	Kids Vote	Nominated	
2012	Children's BAFTA Award	Kids Vote	Nominated	
2013	Children's BAFTA Award	Kids Vote	Nominated	

== See also ==
- Animal Jam Classic
