= Toontown =

Toontown is a common placename for a fictional place where cartoon characters (toons) reside. It may refer to:

== Disney ==
- Mickey Mouse universe, a fictional shared universe that is the setting for stories involving Disney cartoon characters
- Toontown, a fictional city in the 1988 film Who Framed Roger Rabbit
- Mickey's Toontown, a themed land at Disneyland and Tokyo Disneyland
- Toontown Online, a now-defunct 2003 Disney video game
- Toontown Rewritten, a fan recreation of Toontown Online

== Other ==
- "Toontown", a nickname for Saskatoon, a city in Canada
