= Jesse Schell =

American video game designer (born 1970)

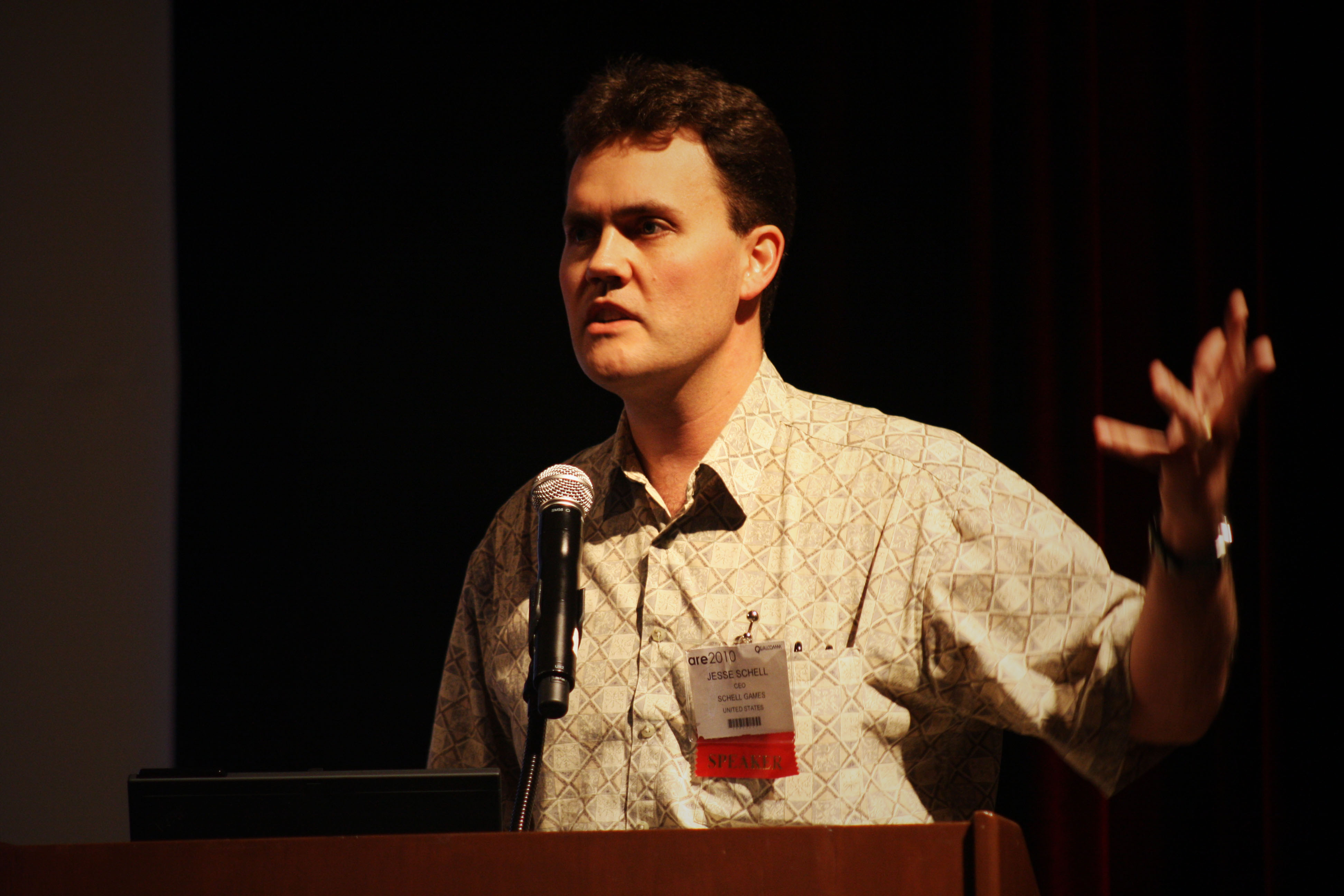
- Schell, 2010
- Born: June 13, 1970 (age 56)
- Education: Rensselaer Polytechnic Institute; Carnegie Mellon University
- Known for: Toontown Online; The Art of Game Design
- Spouse: Nyra Schell
- Awards: Top 10 Young Innovators
- Scientific career
- Fields: Computer science Entertainment Technology
- Workplaces: Carnegie Mellon University; Schell Games

Jesse N. Schell (born June 13, 1970) is an American video game designer and author, as well as the CEO of Schell Games, and a distinguished professor of the practice of entertainment technology at CMU's Entertainment Technology Center (ETC), a joint master's program between the College of Fine Arts and School of Computer Science in Pittsburgh, Pennsylvania.

Schell earned a bachelor's degree in computer science from Rensselaer Polytechnic Institute (RPI) and subsequently, earned a master's degree in Information Networking from Carnegie Mellon University. His early career consisted of his work as a Software Engineer for IBM and Bell Communications Research. He then moved to Los Angeles to work with Disney Imagineering.

He has also worked as a writer, director, performer, juggler, comedian, and circus artist for both Freihofer's Mime Circus and the Juggler's Guild.

== Career ==
After graduating from the Information Networking Institute at CMU in 1994 with a Master of Science in computer networking and virtual reality, Jesse Schell went on to work for Bell Labs. In 1995 he joined Walt Disney Imagineering, where he worked for seven years in the capacity of programmer, manager, designer, and creative director on several projects. These included rides for theme parks such as DisneyQuest and massively multiplayer online games such as Toontown Online. During his time at Disney, he met Carnegie Mellon professor Randy Pausch, who was taking a sabbatical in the lab where Schell worked. When Pausch founded the Entertainment Technology Center at CMU, he invited Schell to become a faculty member. Schell joined the faculty in 2002.

In 2002, Schell founded Schell Games, and is its CEO. At Tech 50 in 2016, Schell was awarded CEO of the year, and the year prior, Schell was named one of Pittsburgh's 50 most powerful people.

In 2008, Schell published a book titled The Art of Game Design. A second edition was later published in 2014, and a third edition in 2019.

Schell is known for his talks on game design, and is best known for his DICE 2010 talk, "Beyond Facebook", which was adopted as a TED "Best of the Web" talk.

In 2015, Schell was awarded with a Carnegie Science Award in the entrepreneur category. The program celebrates innovators who have distinguished themselves by making contributions to science and technology in various disciplines. The following year, Schell received a 2016 Creator-of-the-Year award at the CREATE Festival.

Since 2016, Schell has been in talks with Disney about reviving Toontown Online. As of August 2018, Schell noted that he was actively talking to Disney about obtaining the rights to Toontown Online. Schell is fond of Toontown Rewritten, a fan recreation of the game, saying in an article for Wired that the message behind Toontown was "don't let the corporation grind you [down]".

== Games and rides ==
Schell contributed to the development of certain video games and rides.

=== Games ===
- Toontown Online
- Pirates of the Caribbean Online
- Pixie Hollow

=== Rides ===
- Pirates of the Caribbean: Battle for Buccaneer Gold
- Toy Story Midway Mania
