= Make-up (disambiguation) =

Make-up or makeup may refer to:

- Cosmetics, for use in face-to-face interactions
- Theatrical makeup, for performers
- Prosthetic makeup
- Renewing or restoring an interpersonal or intimate relationship

== Music ==
- Make-Up (American band), a Washington DC area band
- Make-Up (Japanese band), a Japanese band
- Make Up (album), an album by Flower Travellin' Band, or the title song
- Make Up (EP), an EP by Hyomin
- Make Up (record label), see RecRec Music
- "Make Up", a song by Ariana Grande from the album Thank U, Next
- "Make Up", a song from Lou Reed's 1972 album Transformer
- "Make Up", a song by Psapp from the album The Only Thing I Ever Wanted
- "Make Up", a song by The Script from the album Freedom Child
- "Make Up (Vice and Jason Derulo song)", 2018

== Movies ==
- Make-Up (1932 film), a French film directed by Karl Anton
- Make-Up (1937 film), a British film
- Makeup (2002 film), a Kannada film
- Make-Up (2014 film), a Korean film
- Make Up (2019 film), an English film
- Makeup (2021 film), a Bangladeshi film

== See also ==
- Body painting
