= Nabab LLB =

2020 Bangladeshi legal drama film directed by Anonno Mamun

- Theatrical release poster
- Directed by: Anonno Mamun
- Written by: Anonno Mamun
- Screenplay by: Anonno Mamun
- Story by: Pappu Raj
- Produced by: Azmat Hossain
- Starring: Shakib Khan; Mahiya Mahi; Orchita Sporshia; Shahiduzzaman Selim
- Cinematography: Mehedi Rony
- Edited by: Ekaramul Haque
- Music by: Dolaan Maainnakk
- Production company: Celebrity Production
- Distributed by: iTheatre
- Release dates: 16 December 2020 (Part 1); 1 January 2021 (Part 2)
- Running time: 192 minutes (Note: The length of the first part of the film is 92 minutes and the length of the next part is 100 minutes.)(OTT Version); 143.27 minutes (Note: The film was censored 9.43 minutes. Total length was 153.10 minutes before it was censored.) (Theatrical version)
- Country: Bangladesh
- Language: Bangla
- Budget: ৳15 million (US$120,000)

Nabab LLB (also known as Nabab LLB: BACK FOR JUSTICE) is a Bangladeshi legal drama film. The film is directed and written by Anonno Mamun and produced by Azmat Hossain under the banner of Celebrity Production. It is a courtroom drama based on rape and violence against women. The film depicts the story of raped women protesting for their rights through social protests and the judicial system. The film revolves around a rape victim, Shuvra (played by Orchita Sporshia), who is a radio jockey by profession, with Shakib Khan, who fought a legal battle in court as her chief lawyer, Mahiya Mahi and Shahiduzzaman Selim played in the lead roles.

The film was scheduled to begin on 28 March 2020 but was postponed due to the COVID-19 pandemic in Bangladesh. Later, the principal photography of the film began on 30 August 2020 and wrapped up on 10 December 2020. The film soundtrack is composed by Dolaan Maainnakk; previously, she collaborated with Khan in Bhaijaan Elo Re in 2018. It is the second collaboration between Khan and Mahi after the film Bhalobasha Aaj Kal in 2013 and the first between Khan and Sporshia and also the first between director Anonno Mamun and Khan. The film was released in two parts at an over-the-top media service named iTheatre on 16 December 2020 and 1 January 2021, respectively. Aiming at raising social awareness, Nabab LLB touches upon themes such as the social exclusion of rape victims, the struggles and reactions of their family members, and the social stigmas that arise in a woman's life after such an unfortunate incident.

== Plot ==
A girl named Ifrat Afrin Shuvra (Orchita Sporshia) works as an RJ in a radio station named Modern Radio, whose family is dependent on her income. One night, while returning from the office, her office boss Newaz Bashar (Rashed Mamun Apu) and his friends forcibly raped Shuvra. Newaz Bashar is the younger brother of local MP Azimul Bashar (Sumon Anwar). Her family and boyfriend forbade her to lodge a complaint with the police, thinking of society and sociality. After this incident, Shuvra became mentally upset and tried to commit suicide. Shuvra failed to adapt to the rapists' social status and power, eventually decided to lodge a complaint with the police. Her family and boyfriend surrendered to her zeal and decided to support her in this fight. Meanwhile, the police made various excuses not to take up the case for fear of the power of those against whom she complained. Eventually, the police were forced to register the lawsuit. After lodging the lawsuit, Shuvra reached the chamber of city's biggest lawyer Azhar Chowdhury (Shahiduzzaman Selim) with the file of the lawsuit to fight her case. Where she met Azhar Chowdhury's assistant lawyer, Abanti Chowdhury, who is Azhar Chowdhury's daughter also. With her help, Shuvra met Azhar Chowdhury and requested him to fight her lawsuit in court. Meanwhile, Azhar Chowdhury decided to fight the lawsuit on behalf of the rapists instead of fighting the Shuvra's lawsuit of greed for money. Shuvra was disappointed by Azhar Chowdhury's decision and was referred to her a well-known lawyer by an assistant lawyer. This assistant actually works for lawyer Nabab Chowdhury. Nabab Chowdhury (Shakib Khan), who is a chaotic and whimsical lawyer. Who does not fight lawsuits in court, takes people hostage and earns money by lying. Taking advantage of Shuvra's weakness, he lies about himself, promising to fight the lawsuit and win. Believing his words, Shuvra pays him a check for ৳5 lakh in advance of the case fee. Meanwhile, Nabab Chowdhury did not appear in court after drinking alcohol with his assistants the night before the case was declared. Lawyer Azhar Chowdhury tried to divert the case, which was started in the absence of the Nabab. Due to the absence of Nabab in the court, everyone points fingers at Shuvra. Shuvra is called characterless, and it is rumored that she has filed this false case for greed of money. In this incident, Shuvra's mother suffered a heart attack as she could not bear the ridicule of her neighbors. Shuvra's mother died in the ambulance while being taken to the hospital. Shuvra was devastated by the death of her mother, and her younger sister went straight to the Nabab's house with her mother's body. Shuvra's younger sister called Nabab Chowdhury who was fully drunk and told him to fight a case. She blamed Nabab for killing her mother and said he would fight the case against himself.

== Cast ==
- Shakib Khan as Nabab Chowdhury, a junior lawyer; he later fought a legal battle in court as Shuvra's chief lawyer in the Shuvra rape case
- Mahiya Mahi as Abanti Chowdhury, Azhar Chowdhury's daughter as well as assistant; When her father opposed Shuvra's case, she cooperated with the Nabab on behalf of Shuvra
- Orchita Sporshia as Ifrat Afrin Shuvra a.k.a. RJ Shuvra, a Modern Radio's RJ; later she was gang-raped by Nawaz Bashar and his friends
- Shahiduzzaman Selim as Azhar Chowdhury, a senior lawyer; he fought a legal battle in the court on behalf of Nawaz Bashar and his friends in the Shuvra gangrape case
- Rashed Mamun Apu as Newaz Bashar, Owner of Modern Radio and Azimul Bashar's younger brother; he is the main accused in the Shuvra gangrape case. He and his friends gang-raped Shuvra
- Kristiano Tanmoy as Ashis, Shuvra's fiancé; he later married Shuvra and became one of her witnesses
- Sumon Anowar as Azimul Bashar, country's famous politician and Newaz's elder brother; he was later arrested on charges of raping his younger brother's wife, Ritu Bashar
- Sushoma Sarkar as Ritu Bashar, Newaz Bashar's wife; she later became the main witness in the Shuvra gangrape case and opposite Azimul Bashar
- Shahed Ali as Kirmani, Nabab's assistant
- Anwar Hossain as Load-shedding, Nabab's second assistant
- Lutfur Rahman Khan Shimanto as Junaid Siddiqui, Newaz's friend; he is the second accused in the Shuvra gangrape case
- Shabnam Parvin as Chief Judge
- Kazi Uzzal as Jafar, Nabab's landlord
- Shaheen Mridha as Nizam, a police constable; who filed Shuvra's gangrape case
- Jadu Azad as Azad Bhai, a local goon, one of Nabab's clients
- Ridy Sheikh, Item number in the song "Just Chill"

== Production ==
=== Pre-production ===
After completing the screenplay, director Anonno Mamun announced the film on 15 March 2020, as well as Mahiya Mahi and Sporshia confirmed the signing for the film. Khan confirmed that he has played a lawyer in the film. On 30 August 2020, Shahiduzzaman Selim and Shahed Ali also joined in the cast. Khan has previously starred in an Indo-Bangladesh joint production's of almost similar title named Nabab. During pre-production, the director of the film clarified that it was not linked or related to the previous one. During the COVID-19 outbreak, Dipankar Dipon also joined the team as a script doctor. Bangla Tribune confirmed the production company Celebrity Productions has set the initial budget of ৳15 million.

=== Filming ===
The principal photography of the film began on 30 August 2020, after seven months from the proposed date due to the COVID-19 pandemic in Bangladesh. In-house filming was complete at Bangladesh Film Development Corporation and outdoor scenes were shot at Uttara, Hatirjheel, Jagannath University, Kanchpur, Purbachal in Dhaka, Bangladesh. The makers planned to shoot the songs in London, UK and the Maldives. However, due to the global coronavirus pandemic and visa complications, the film was later filmed at the Radisson Blu Hotel in Dhaka. The film wrapped up on 10 December 2020.

== Soundtrack ==
Nabab LLB (Original Motion Picture Soundtrack)

Soundtrack album by Dolaan Mainnakk
- Recorded: 2020
- Studio: Celebrity Productions
- Genre: Feature Film Soundtrack
- Length: 11:27
- Language: Bengali
- Label: iTheatre
- Producer: Dolaan Mainnakk

Singles from Nabab LLB
- 1. "Ami Nabab" Released: 22 November 2020; 2. "Just Chill" Released: 11 December 2020; 3. "Believe Me" Released: 13 December 2020

Dolaan Maainnakk chronology
Bhaijaan Elo Re (2018)	Nabab LLB (2020)

The film soundtrack is composed by Dolaan Maainnak. Three songs have been used in the film. The first in the film, titled "Ami Nabab", is composed by Dolaan Maainnak and penned by Tabib Mahmud. The song was initially recorded by Pantho Kanai, but later the version sung by Sampreet Dutta was kept for the film. Anonno Mamun faced criticism for dropping Pantho Kanai's version. The song's teaser was released on 7 August 2020 as a promotional teaser. Later, the song was released as a promotional single on YouTube and iTheatre on 22 August 2020.

Track listing
No.	Title	Lyrics	Singer(s)	Length
1.	"Ami Nabab (আমি নবাব)"	Tabib Mahmud, Dolaan Mainnakk	Sampreet Dutta	3:17
2.	"Just Chill"	Dolaan Mainnakk	Supratip Bhattacharya, Antara Mitra	3:40
3.	"Believe Me"	Anonno Mamun (Additional lyrics by Ramesh Das)	Imran Mahmudul, Konal	4:30
Total length:				11:27

== Release ==
=== OTT release ===
The film was released in two parts on the over-the-top media service iTheatre, becoming the first Dhallywood film to be released on any OTT platform. The first chapter of the film was released on 16 December 2020 on the occasion of Victory Day of Bangladesh and the second one on 1 January 2021 on the occasion of New Year 2021. The film was initially scheduled to be released in cinemas on the occasion of 2020 Eid al-Fitr, but was delayed by the COVID-19 pandemic in Bangladesh. Later, it was planned to be released on 23 October 2020, on the occasion of the Durga Puja. After being released in half form, the film director Anonno Mamun faced criticism by the audiences. Within a week after its release, the film faced serious online piracy.

=== Censor clearance ===
In mid-January 2021, after many controversies the film was submitted to the Bangladesh Film Censor Board for clearance. The censor board authorities objected to 11 scenes in the film. The censor board authorities wrote a letter to the director and producer to re-censor the film by removing the objectionable scenes and adding new ones. However, the film's director Anonno Mamun opposes cutting the dialogue of the film "Rape of a woman means killing of freedom". Subsequently, the film was re-submitted to the censor board after omitting those 11 scenes (9.43 minutes). On 15 June 2021, the film got censor clearance for theatrical release.

=== Theatrical release ===
The film released in 16 theatres simultaneously across Bangladesh on 25 June 2021.

=== World television premier ===
The film had its World Television Premier on Channel i on the occasion of 2021 Eid al-Adha.

== Reception ==
=== Critical reception ===
The film received acclaim from critics and audiences. Md. Moniruzzaman of Bangla Movie Database called Nabab LLB a "well-structured film" and praised its coherent story, which stands out among typical Bangladeshi movies. He noted that while the film's comedy could have been more refined, the serious scenes by Shakib Khan were impressive. Although there are minor flaws, especially with adult content and some familiar courtroom scenes reminiscent of Bollywood's Jolly LLB, Moniruzzaman believes the film will not disappoint viewers looking for a solid Bengali movie experience. Overall, he rated it 6.5 out of 10 stars. In another review in Bangla Movie Database, Rahman Moti rated the film 5/10, noting a conflict between the film's subject and execution. While the film tackles a sensitive and contemporary issue like anti-rape activism, Moti highlights its limitations in terms of production quality. He criticizes the over-the-top heroism of Shakib Khan in the second part, which overshadows the focus on the victim, Sporshia. Additionally, some scenes are reminiscent of the Hindi film Pink (2016), and the courtroom dynamics fall short. Despite these flaws, Moti acknowledges the importance of the film's theme and wishes the director better success in future projects. Film critic and lyricist Zahid Akbar of The Daily Star highlights Nabab LLB as a socially relevant film about a rape survivor's struggles. Shakib Khan's character grows from a carefree lawyer to a responsible one, with solid performances from Shahiduzzaman Selim and Mahiya Mahi. While the screenplay has slow moments and unnecessary scenes, Anonno Mamun's direction is praised, and Archita Sporshia's performance stands out. Despite some flaws, the film resonates with timely themes.

=== Awards and nomination ===
Events	Date of Events	Category	Nominee	Results	Ref
Meril-Prothom Alo Awards	27 May 2022	Best Actor (Popular choice)	Shakib Khan	Nominated	
Meril-Prothom Alo Awards	27 May 2022	Best Actress	Mahiya Mahi	Nominated	

== Controversy ==
In a scene and dialogue of the film, a rape victim is seen going to the police station to file a case. In that scene and dialogue, a police SI (played by Shaheen Mridha) asked the victim various questions about the rape. Bangladesh Police objected to this. On 24 December 2020, Nasirul Amin, an inspector of the Cyber and Special Crimes Division of the Dhaka Metropolitan Detective Police, filed a case under the Pornography Act (No. 21) (Note: Bangla Tribune mention that the number is 21. Although Channel i mention that it is 11.) at the Ramna Police Station, alleging misrepresentation of the police in that scene and dialogue. The director, Anonno Mamun, actor Shaheen Mridha and lead actress of the film Orchita Sporshia were named as the three accused in the case. The Cyber and Special Crime Division unit of the Dhaka Metropolitan Detective Police arrested director Anonno Mamun and actor Shaheen Mridha from Mirpur, Dhaka on the same night. On 25 December, the investigating officer of the case, Detective Inspector Abul Kalam Azad, produced the two accused in court and requested they be kept in jail till the end of the investigation. Following his appeal, the judge ordered the accused to be sent to jail.

Fazlur Rahman, additional deputy commissioner, Cyber and Special Crime Division of Detective Police, said, "The Nabab LLB film has been partially released online. In a scene of the film, a woman who has been raped has been seen questioning a person playing the role of a policeman in obscene and offensive language. On the one hand, it has tarnished the image of the police, women have also been insulted. A lawsuit have been filed in this regard and the director and an actor of the film have been arrested".
