= Club Penguin Island =

2017 online role-playing video game

- Developer: Disney Canada Inc. (published by Disney Mobile)
- Type: Massively multiplayer online role-playing game, single-player video game
- Launched: Android, iOS; March 29, 2017; Windows, macOS; November 30, 2017
- Discontinued: December 20, 2018; 7 years ago
- Operating systems: iOS, Android, Windows, macOS (Unity)
- Website: Club Penguin Island website at the Wayback Machine (archived December 19, 2018)

Club Penguin Island was a massively-multiplayer online role-playing game (MMORPG). It was a de facto successor to Club Penguin. The game was released worldwide on March 29, 2017 and was created by Disney Canada Inc.

The game's public beta testing period took place in Australia and New Zealand from December 15, 2016 to its worldwide release, and in Canada from January 13, 2017 to its worldwide release. The game was discontinued on December 20, 2018. The gameplay is similar to that of the original Club Penguin, though it runs on the game engine Unity rather than Adobe Flash Player.

Club Penguin Island received mixed reviews from critics (Note: Results calculated by averaging these reviews: Review By Club Penguin Mountains (Positive); Review By Polygon (Negative); Review By AppAdvice (Negative); Review By LaughingPlace (Positive)) and many negative reviews from some of the original game's old players upon its worldwide release for lacking many features of the original version at launch as well as a lack of features for non-subscribers. The 1.8 update, released on November 30, 2017, received positive reviews for adding fan-requested features and launching a PC and Mac version of the game.

Despite this, the continued negative perception among fans, and intense competition from other online games, as well as from private servers of the original Club Penguin and other former Disney MMOs like Toontown Online, resulted in Club Penguin Island becoming a commercial failure.

On September 27, 2018, Disney confirmed the imminent discontinuation of Club Penguin Island in a letter obtained by the website Kotaku, as well as in an official blog post. It was removed from Google Play and the App Store on November 20, 2018. Downloading for desktop was also removed on December 20, 2018.

On November 5, 2018, the final update, version 1.13.0, was released, which included an offline mode, effectively making the game still available as a single-player experience. At 10:00 AM PST on December 20, 2018, Club Penguin Island had shut down their servers. All users that were playing Club Penguin Island at the time received an error message telling them that the connection was lost. Offline Mode was activated on December 21, 2018. Most of Club Penguin Island's URLs redirect to the official Disney website.

== History ==
The game was originally known under the code name of Project: Super Secret, first used in 2014 and teased with sneak peeks in June 2015. However, Project: Super Secret was initially said to be Disney Mix, with the game's actual development confirmed to have started in 2015. On November 17, 2016, the project was revealed to be Club Penguin Island. The official website for the game was released and pre-registration began allowing players to pre-register their account for the game. By pre-registering, players would receive a Beta Hat, a set of six emojis, and 100 coins. Additionally, players had the option of connecting their Club Penguin accounts with their Club Penguin Island account. If this was done, they would also receive the Alumni Jacket, with a number on the back displaying how many years the connected Club Penguin account has existed. The pre-registration was ended on March 29, 2017. The game's closed beta took place between its announcement and December 2016 in North America.

A semi-private "geo-beta" took place in Australia and New Zealand between December 15, 2016 to its worldwide release. This beta was extended to iOS users in Canada on January 13, 2017.

The original Flash game's servers went offline on the day of the game's release on March 30, 2017 at 12:01:39 AM PDT (7:01:39 AM UTC).

On September 27, 2018, Disney confirmed in a letter to Disney Canada, obtained by the website Kotaku, that Club Penguin Island would be shutting down. Disney HR cited "global competition" as a factor in their decision.

In addition to the shutdown, the entire Club Penguin team, based out of Kelowna, British Columbia, was laid off, despite being greenlit for two more years of work only three weeks prior to the announcement of the shutdown.

The Mobile App was removed from the Google Play Store and App Store on November 20, 2018, one month prior to the server shutdown.

The game was shut down on December 20, 2018 and is no longer available to play online.

Offline mode was launched on December 21, allowing the player's account/penguin to be saved after the shutdown.

== Plot and gameplay ==
2 penguins in Coconut Cove

Club Penguin Island is divided into various zones and distinct areas and contains a variety of features. Each player has a penguin level that is a measurement of their progress. Progress increases as the player completes Adventures and Daily Challenges. Every time a player reaches a new level, they receive a reward in the form of a pack, containing various items, such as emojis or blueprints. All rewards apart from emojis in these packs require membership to use.

== Features ==
Club Penguin Island's features centered around customization and progression. Players could design clothing using blueprints, fabrics, and decals, customize igloos, and collect items scattered around the island. Adventures (quests) and Daily Challenges were the main ways to earn coins, XP, and level up. The game also offered various multiplayer games, seasonal events, and a phone-based hub called Island Live for tracking challenges and events.

== Membership ==
Membership unlocked most of the game's full content, while free players had a meaningful but limited experience. When the game shut down, all players received free membership on November 5, 2018, followed by an Offline Mode on December 21, 2018, which let players access a solo, device-stored version of the game with added developer tools like Debug Mode.

=== Offline Mode ===
Offline Mode was added to Club Penguin Island in the game's final update, and it was activated on December 21, 2018. It allowed players to log in to a limited version of the game, which stored their penguins on their devices. Players were unable to see or interact with any other penguins in the game.

A new feature called Debug Mode was also added, which is a tool that Club Penguin Island's developers used to test the game. It allows players to teleport to different locations in the game, add a custom number of coins to their account, and import/export their player data – among other tweaks. The network menu allows players to create their own private server using SmartFoxServer (similarly to private servers from the original Club Penguin), although there is no documentation on how to do so. A content submenu was added on March 28, 2019; it allows players to customize the game.

== Accolades ==
The game was nominated for "Best Music in a Casual/Social Game" at the 16th Annual Game Audio Network Guild Awards.
