= Abar Boshonto =

2019 film from Bangladesh

- Abar Boshonto Movie Poster
- Directed by: Anonno Mamun
- Written by: Anonno Mamun
- Produced by: Trans Atlantic Multimedia Ltd.
- Starring: Tariq Anam Khan; Orchita Sporshia; Monira Mithu; Ananda Khaled; Mukit Jakariya; Imtu Ratish
- Production company: Tam Multimedia
- Distributed by: Action Cut Entertainment
- Release date: 5 June 2019
- Country: Bangladesh
- Language: Bangla

Abar Boshonto (Bengali: আবার বসন্ত) is a 2019 Bangladeshi film. The film is written and directed by Anonno Mamun and produced by Tam Multimedia. It features Tariq Anam Khan and Orchita Sporshia in the lead roles. Monira Mithu, Ananda Khaled, Mukit Jakariya, and Imtu Ratish play supporting roles. The film was released on 5 June 2019. For the film, Tariq Anam Khan won his second National Film Award for Best Actor.

== Cast ==
- Tariq Anam Khan as Imran Chowdhury
- Orchita Sporshia as Tithi Mostofa
- Imtu Ratish as Imran Chowdhury's son
- Monira Mithu as Imran Chowdhury's daughter
- Mukit Zakaria as Tushar
- Kobori Mizan as Tithi's mother
- Anando Khaled as Imran Chowdhury's private assistant
- Nusrat Jahan Papiya as Imran Chowdhury's grandchildren

== Awards ==
- National Film Award for Best Actor - Tariq Anam Khan (won)
