= EasyDNS =

Canadian domain registrar and DNS hosting provider

easyDNS Technologies Inc.
- Company type: Domain name registrar, DNS and web hosting services
- Founded: 1998
- Headquarters: 4243C Dundas Street West, Suite 405, Etobicoke, Ontario, Canada
- Owner: Mark Jeftovic
- Website: easydns.com
- ASN: 16686

easyDNS Technologies Inc. is a Canadian domain name registrar and provider of DNS, web hosting and email services. Founded in 1998, the company is based in Etobicoke, Ontario.

Mark Jeftovic, a co-founder and the company's chief executive officer, is the author of Managing Mission-Critical Domains and DNS.

== History ==
easyDNS was co-founded in 1998 by Mark Jeftovic, Colin Viebrock and John Schmidt.

On March 2, 2000, easyDNS became an affiliate of ICANN-accredited registrar OpenSRS, which was subsequently acquired by Tucows.

In 2003, easyDNS became directly accredited by ICANN. The company also began accepting payment through E-gold.

In April 2013, easyDNS began accepting Bitcoin as a payment method. In June 2013, it was among several DNS providers affected by a day-long international denial-of-service attack. The attack was not directed at an easyDNS customer.

In August 2014, easyDNS acquired DNS provider ZoneEdit.

In 2018, easyDNS announced integration between conventional domain names and the Ethereum Name Service.

== Controversies ==
=== WikiLeaks ===
In December 2010, easyDNS became involved in the controversy surrounding WikiLeaks after news reports and online commentary confused it with the similarly named EveryDNS, the provider that had withdrawn DNS service from WikiLeaks.org.

After being wrongly accused of terminating WikiLeaks' service, easyDNS agreed to provide DNS service for the WikiLeaks.ch and WikiLeaks.nl domains. Jeftovic said the company would use dedicated servers for the domains so that attacks against WikiLeaks would not affect its other customers. The company was also approached about providing service for WikiLeaks.org, although that transfer did not take place. Some easyDNS customers who opposed WikiLeaks threatened to leave the company, while Jeftovic said that most customer responses to its decision were supportive.

=== Police Intellectual Property Crime Unit ===
In October 2013, the Police Intellectual Property Crime Unit (PIPCU) of the City of London Police asked easyDNS to redirect the domain torrentpond.com to an IP address controlled by the police. easyDNS refused, saying that the request was not supported by a court order.

The dispute subsequently involved three other domains that had been suspended by registrar PublicDomainRegistry after requests from PIPCU. The domain owners attempted to transfer the names to easyDNS, but PublicDomainRegistry initially prevented the transfers. A dispute-resolution panel later ruled that the registrar could not prevent the transfers solely on the basis of the police request and ordered the domains transferred to easyDNS.

=== Online pharmacy policy ===
In 2014, easyDNS became involved in a dispute over requests to suspend domain names used by online pharmacies. The National Association of Boards of Pharmacy (NABP) had urged registrars to take action against domains associated with pharmacies it regarded as operating illegally. Jeftovic objected to suspending or preventing transfers of domain names solely on the basis of such requests without legal process.

The company later changed its policy after learning that a man had died after taking a substance purchased from a website whose domain was registered through easyDNS. The company said it had not previously known of the case. Following discussions with ICANN and the Food and Drug Administration, easyDNS introduced a requirement that online pharmacies using its services be accredited by one of several recognised pharmacy-accreditation organisations.

=== Leaked contact details ===
Between October 25 and 26, 2018, contact details belonging to approximately 1,500 easyDNS domain-name customers were exposed in public WHOIS results despite the customers having enabled privacy protection. The exposure resulted from a software issue involving Tucows, which provided backend domain-registration services to easyDNS.
