= Anonno Mamun =

Bangladeshi film director and screenwriter

- অনন্য মামুন
- Born: 27 March 1986 (age 40); Bogra
- Occupations: Film director, screenwriter, producer
- Years active: 2010–present
- Organization: Action Cut Entertainment
- Spouse: Aysha Nudrat Supti

Anonno Mamun (Bengali: অনন্য মামুন), (born 27 March 1986) is a Bangladeshi film director, screenwriter, producer and sole owner of Action Cut Entertainment LLC, a film production and distribution company. His works include Most Welcome, Ami Shudhu Cheyechi Tomay, Ostitto, Ami Tomar Hote Chai, Nabab LLB, Makeup, Koshai, Amanush, and Dard.

== Biography ==
Anonno Mamun started his career in 2000 as a script writer for Tollywood films. He had written several high-profile films in Bangladesh film industry. In 2010 he directed his first film, Wanted, followed by his second directorial project, Most Welcome, in 2012. He directed Ami Shudhu Cheyechi Tomay in 2014, it was the first co-production film between Bangladesh and India. Anonno Mamun is the first Bangladeshi director to helm a pan-India film, Dard, which was produced as a joint collaboration between Bangladesh and India. In 2015 he released Blackmail (2015 film) and Valobashar Golpo.

In 2016 the Arifin Shuvoo and Nusrat Imrose Tisha starrer Ostitto was released. The same year, Mamun worked on Ami Tomar Hote Chai, starring Bappy Chowdhury and Bidya Sinha Saha Mim.

Anonno Mamun's production company, Action Cut Entertainment, officially released Indian Hindi films in Bangladesh for the first time in nearly 50 years. These films include Pathaan, Jawan, Animal, Kisi Ka Bhai Kisi Ki Jaan, and Dunki. This initiative marked the beginning of a new era of regular Bollywood film screenings in the Bangladeshi cinema industry.

=== Legal issues ===
In 2017 Mamun was arrested in Malaysia for smuggling 57 people under the pretext of a cultural event. However, after the allegations were proven to be false, the Malaysian government issued him a clearance letter and released him.

In December 2020, the first part of his fictional courtroom drama Nabab LLB was released on Bangladeshi streaming services. The unfavourable depiction of the Bangladeshi police force handling the case of a sexual assault victim in the movie led to Mamun's arrest on 25 December 2020, along with the actor who portrayed a policeman, Shaheen Mridha.

== Filmography ==
Year	Film	Role	Actors	Notes
2010	Wanted	Screenwriter	Jeet, Srabanti Chatterjee	Remake of Athadu
2012	Most Welcome	Director & Screenwriter	Ananta Jalil, Afiea Nusrat Barsha, Abdur Razzak	
2014	Ami Shudhu Cheyechi Tomay	Director & Screenwriter	Ankush, Subhashree Ganguly	Indo-Bangladesh joint production
2015	Blackmail	Director & Screenwriter	Anisur Rahman Milon, Bobby, Moushumi Hamid	
2015	Bhalobashar Golpo	Director	Kayes Arju, Munia Afrin Sadia, Anisur Rahman Milon	
2016	Ostitto	Director	Arifin Shuvoo, Tisha	
2016	Ami Tomar Hote Chai	Director	Bappy Chowdhury, Mim	
2018	Tui Sudhu Amar	Director	Soham Chakraborty, Mahiya Mahi, Om	
2019	Abar Boshonto	Director	Tariq Anam Khan, Orchita Sporshia	
2020	Nabab LLB	Director	Shakib Khan, Mahiya Mahi, Orchita Sporshia	iTheatre film
2021	Koshai	Director	Nirab, Priyo Moni, Rashed Mamun Apu, Quazi Nawshaba Ahmed, Farhan Khan Rio	iTheatre film
2022	Psycho	Director	Roshan, Puja Cherry Roy, Farhan Khan Rio	iTheatre film
2022	Amanush	Director	Nirab, Mithila, Misha Sawdagor, Shahiduzzaman Selim, Farhan Khan Rio	
2023	Radio	Director	Riaz, Momo, Lutfur Rahman George, Nader Chowdhury, Shafiul Alam Babu, Tanzila Haque Maisha	
2024	Dard	Director	Shakib Khan, Sonal Chauhan, Farhan Khan Rio	Indo-Bangladesh joint production Pan-Indian film
2025	Makeup	Director	Roshan, Nipa Ahmed Realy, Tariq Anam Khan	
TBA	Sporsho†	Director	Nirab, Rituparna Sengupta, Farhan Khan Rio	Indo-Bangladesh joint venture film; Co-directed with Abhinondon Dutt
TBA	Bandhan†	Director	Shipan Mitra, Orchita Sporshia, Sanj John, Amiya Amei, Kristiano Tanmoy, Moumita Hari	Unreleased

=== Web series ===
Year	Title	Co-artist
2018	Indubala	Popy, ABM Sumon, Achol, Tariq Anam Khan, Shahiduzzaman Selim
2018	Phone X	Annjela Joly, Imtu Ratish, Sanj John, Madhumita Gupta, Srabanti Banerjee,
2020	Dhoka	ABM Sumon, Airin Sultana, Achol, Sanj John
2020	Journey	Achol, Imtu Ratish, Farhan Khan Rio
