= Farhan Khan Rio =

Bangladeshi actor

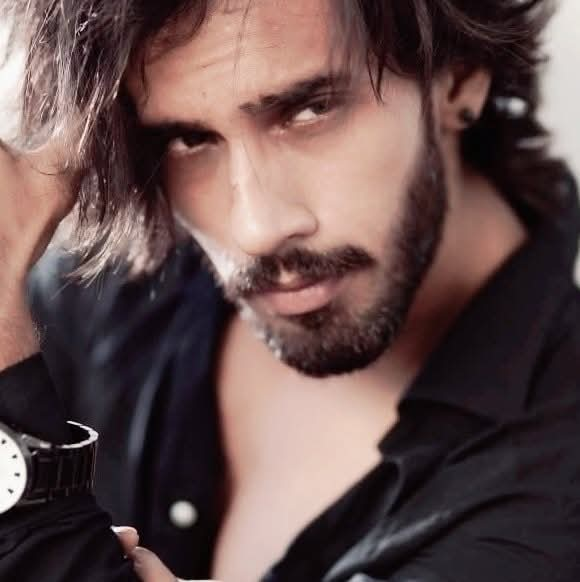
- Official portrait of Farhan Khan Rio, Bangladeshi actor
- Born: 2 February 1984 (age 41)
- Citizenship: Bangladeshi
- Occupation(s): Actor, model
- Years active: 2012–present

Farhan Khan Rio (born 2 February 1984) is a Bangladeshi film actor and model. He began his career as a fashion model in 2012, working with various local brands. Later, he transitioned into acting, appearing in feature films, short films, music videos, and web series. He gained recognition for his role in the 2022 action thriller Psycho, and for his performance in the 2024 India-Bangladesh joint production film Dard.

== Career ==
After modeling, Farhan Khan Rio transitioned into acting, gradually appearing in feature films, short films, music videos, and web series. He has portrayed diverse roles in both mainstream and independent productions. One of his notable appearances was in the music video Bolte Parini, directed by National Award-winning filmmaker Saikat Nasir, with vocals by renowned singer Kumar Bishwajit.

Rio made his film debut in 2022 with the action thriller Psycho, directed by Anonno Mamun. He played an antagonist alongside co-stars Ziaul Roshan and Puja Cherry. The film received media attention upon release, and his performance as a villain was particularly praised. This role marked a significant shift in his career from modeling to acting.

In 2024, he appeared in Dard, a psychological romantic thriller co-produced by India and Bangladesh, also directed by Anonno Mamun. The film was simultaneously shot in both Hindi and Bengali, with the Bengali version titled Dard. It was released internationally. In the film, Rio played the role of a police officer.

== Other notable works ==
Farhan Khan Rio appeared in the music video Bhalobasha Dao, directed by Evan Monowar. The song was performed by Akash Sen and Dilshad Nahar Kona. The video was a musical adaptation inspired by William Shakespeare's Romeo and Juliet.

== Filmography ==
Year	Films	Role	Director	Reference
2021	Koshai	Boss	Anonno Mamun	
2022	Kagoj	Jihad	Ali Julfikar Jahedi	
2022	Psycho	Sonnet	Anonno Mamun	
2022	Amanush	Inspector Rio	Anonno Mamun	
2024	Dard	Akash	Anonno Mamun	

== Web series ==
Year	Title	Director	Reference
2019	Trapped	Saikat Nasir	

== Short films ==
Year	Title	Director	Reference
2020	D Te Drissho	Evan Monwar	
2021	Angul	Evan Monwar	
2022	Hello Shohana	Evan Monwar	

== Awards and nominations ==
Year	Award	Category	Film	Result	Ref.
2025	Moyurponkhi Star Awards	For Outstanding Performance Best actor	Dorod	Won	
2024	AJFB Awards	Best Actor Negative Role	Psycho	Won	
2022	BIFA Awards	Best Actor Short Film	Angul	Won	
2019	Walton Performance Awards	Best Actor webseries	Trapped	Won	
