= Police Intellectual Property Crime Unit =

City of London Police department

The Police Intellectual Property Crime Unit (PIPCU) is a unit of the City of London Police, the national lead force for fraud. It was established in 2013 with the responsibility to investigate and deter serious and organised intellectual property crime in the United Kingdom.

It is based in City of London Police's headquarters at Guildhall Yard East. The unit consists of 19 police officers and staff, including detectives and police staff investigators.

Part of PIPCU's remit is to protect consumers from harm, focusing on intellectual property crime that has public safety implications. Since its inception, it has investigated intellectual property crime worth more than £100 million concerning counterfeit goods or digital piracy, and suspended 28,000 websites selling counterfeit goods. These websites have also been linked to identity theft.

== History ==
The operationally-independent unit was launched in September 2013 with funding from the UK government's Intellectual Property Office. It was announced in August 2017 that PIPCU will receive a further £3.2 million from the IPO to fund the unit to June 2019.

In 2013, the unit began Operation Creative to disrupt and prevent websites from providing unauthorised access to copyrighted content in partnership with the creative and advertising industries. Rights holders in the creative industries can report copyright infringing websites to PIPCU, providing a detailed package of evidence indicating how the site is involved in illegal copyright infringement. Research has shown that there has been a 64% decrease in advertising from the UK's top advertising spending companies on copyright infringing websites and an 87% drop in adverts for licensed gambling operators being displayed on illegal sites that infringe copyright.

In 2013, Operation Ashiko was created to targets the sale of online physical counterfeit goods and aims to seize the domains of infringers.

In April 2017, PIPCU launched the IP Crime Directory, a database for customs and police officers to help them identify counterfeit goods with the information uploaded by rights and brand holders.

== Operation Creative ==
Operation Creative, formerly Operation Trade Bridge, is an ongoing campaign against alleged copyright infringing sites and their advertising network. A number of torrent and streaming sites have been either shut down, had their domains seized or threatened by the PIPCU. Whilst over 100 websites have been 'dealt with', the majority of domain name suspension requests are denied.

=== Operations ===
Date	Action	Site/Domain	Result
9 October 2013	Domain Suspensions	SumoTorrent; MisterTorrent; ExtraTorrent via PDR Ltd emp3world.com via PDR Ltd full-albums.net via PDR Ltd maxalbums.com via PDR Ltd	Moved to SumoTorrent.sx - Moved to ExtraTorrent.cc; Restored via EasyDNS; Restored via EasyDNS; Restored via EasyDNS
9 October 2013	Suspension Request	TorrentPond via EasyDNS	Registrar publicly refused request
December 2013	40 domains suspended.	-	-
9 April 2014	Domain Seizure, Arrest	Boxing Guru domains nutjob.eu	Site closure Site closure
21 April 2014	Domain Seizure	thesportstorrentnetwork.co.uk	Site closure
24 May 2014	Domain Seizure	Delishows; Cricfree.tv	Site moved to delishows.to Site moved to Cricfree.eu. 17 August domain was returned
24 May 2014	Domain Seizure	Filecrop	Site closure
26 May 2014	Unlawful domain suspension	Torrentz.eu via Nazwa	Domain unsuspended 27 May (next day)
4 June 2014	Domain Seizure	Putlocker.bz	Domain unsuspended Site moved to bestv.ch
August 2014	Domain Seizure	Potlocker.re	Site moved to Potlocker.me
6 August 2014	Domain Seizures, Arrest	Immunicity and various proxy sites	Temporary site closure Clone sites launched
2 September 2014	Domain Seizure	OnRead via InternetBS	
2 September 2014	Arrest	CoolSport.se, CoolSport.tv and KiwiSportz.tv	Charges dropped 13 October
11 September 2014	Domain Seizure	mp3juices.com	Site closure Initially relaunched as mp3juices.cc Officially relaunched as mp3juices.to in November 2014
4 October 2014	Domain Seizure	Frombar.com (Spotle Network) via eNom	Site voluntarily disabled UK access on other domains
13 March 2015	Arrest - "DJ Mikey L", tracker shut down	Karaoke-World.co.uk	
18 March 2015	Arrest - "Sir Paul"	WWE and UFC uploader	
13 April 2022	Domain Seizure, Arrests	Club Penguin Rewritten	Website transferred to police following takedown action by Disney

In December 2015 they arrested a karaoke subtitle creation gang.

By August 2015, 317 domain suspension requests had been issued.

In March 2021 they claimed the Sci-Hub website could "pose a threat" to university students' personal data.

In April 2022, they seized the website of Club Penguin Rewritten, a fan recreation of the Disney online game, Club Penguin.

=== Immunicity arrest ===

In response to the new round of web blocking in the UK in conjunction with the copyright infringing site blocking programmes, a service called Immunicity was launched. to allow circumvention of both blocking types. However on 6 August 2014 the owner was arrested by the PIPCU under anti-fraud legislation. Anti-censorship supporters created clones of the site such as Immun.es (which closed down shortly after launching) and routingpacketsisnotacrime.uk to resurrect the service.

By August 2015 the immunicity domain was back under the control of anti-censorship activists and displays a website inviting people to use Tor and other anonymity services.

== Infringing website list ==
PIPCU maintains an 'Infringing Website List' (IWL), a portal for digital advertisers to be informed of sites containing infringing content with the intention that they cease advertising on them. Sites are identified as infringing by rights holders and the list is not made available to the public. As of 12 August a freedom of information request from TorrentFreak revealed: 74 domains are subject to the advertiser blocking programme, of which of October 2014 only 2 domains had ever been removed from the list. 83 advertising companies with a UK presence are currently participating.

Working with the media and advertiser industry body, the Audit Bureau of Circulations (ABC) created a technology portal called 'Project Sunblock'. If PIPCU do not receive a response from the website operators, the host or registrar of an allegedly infringing site, the site is added to the IWL via the Sunblock portal, which is then passed along to participating advertising networks for blacklisting. From June 2014 this technology allowed replacing the adverts of websites believed to be offering unauthorized content with warnings from PIPCU.

Piracy warning replacing adverts

In 2014 the PIPCU removed payment provisions from 4,650 offending sites with a .co.uk address from sites on the infringing websites list.

== See also ==
- Ad filtering
- Domain name § Seizures
- Intellectual property
