= Toontown Rewritten =

Toontown Online fan server

- Developer: Toons of the World Foundation
- Type: Massively multiplayer online role-playing game
- Launched: October 28, 2013 (Closed alpha); May 17, 2014 (Closed beta); June 2, 2014 (Semi-open beta); September 19, 2014 (Open beta); September 1, 2017 (Official release)
- Current version: ttr-live-v4.4.3 / September 4, 2026
- Platforms: Microsoft Windows, MacOS and Linux
- Status: Active
- Members: >2,000,000
- Pricing model: Free
- Website: toontownrewritten.com

Toontown Rewritten is a free-to-play fan recreation of the now-defunct Toontown Online. It is currently maintained by the Toons of the World Foundation, a non-profit organization dedicated to the game's preservation. It released to the public in open beta on September 19, 2014, and officially on September 1, 2017. As of 2024, it has over 2 million registered users.

== History and development ==
Development of Toontown Rewritten began immediately after the announcement of Toontown Online's closure in 2013. The lead developer, Joey Ziolkowski, was only 15 at the time, creating the game from his parents' home in Princess Anne, Maryland, and the team was not sure how successful they'd be, with Ziolkowski telling Wired that at the time the team thought it would be "a fun little experiment." The project originally had the codename of "Toonpulse", and was meant to be a standard private server of the original game. Upon the team's realization of the outdated state of the game, the project was rebooted with a focus on "refurbishing" the game to last. The project was completely reverse engineered from publicly available materials, and Toontown Rewritten first opened for alpha testing in October 2013.

The game released open beta on September 19, 2014, and officially on September 1, 2017. Since its launch, the team has added new updates to Rewritten to breathe new life into an old game, such as new Toon species, new boss battles, a planned map expansion, and multiple quality of life updates. Rewritten received its first major expansion, "Sellbot Task Force", in December 2021. The update incorporates Sellbot Field Offices, where the Cogs take over a street's Toon HQ building. Players are tasked with making their way through the Sellbot Field Offices while at a disadvantage. The expansion's storyline would conclude in 2022 with an interactive story mission.

In 2022, the Rewritten team unknowingly helped discover a string of fraudulent disclosure requests from an individual claiming to represent the CT-Cyber Crime Investigation, Dhaka Metropolitan Police.

=== Legality and relationships with original developers ===
The team takes careful measures to avoid legal conflict with Disney – refusing to accept external donations for server costs, forgoing advertisements, and removing Disney characters from their version of the game. In contrast to the original, the game is completely free to play. The team distances themselves from the company; a user accessing the Toontown Rewritten website is prompted to verify that they understand the project is unaffiliated with Disney. In the words of the team's creative media lead, they "try not to poke the bear." Every time a Disney representative has been asked about the project by the press, they choose to decline commenting, and they have done little to stop the project.

Jesse Schell, who played a significant role in Toontown Online's development, is fond of the project, saying in an article for Wired that the message behind Toontown was, "don't let the corporation grind you [down]." He goes on to add, "I look at the Toontown Rewritten crowd, and what do they do? They're violating copyrights all over the place. Why? Because the corporation tore Toontown down." Joey Ziolkowski currently works for Schell Games after impressing Schell with his work on the project. Another original Toontown Online developer, Ron Weaver, described the project as "a huge gift" to him for allowing him to play the game again with his children.

== Community ==
A special event is held in-game annually, known as the Cartoonival, in order to celebrate the anniversary of the original game's launch. Mollie Taylor of PC Gamer writes that she was taken aback by the sheer number of people who attended the 2023 Cartoonival, saying that she had not been expecting "1700 cartoon animals slowing down my 2023 rig to a slideshow and servers buckling because of how many people were swarming to a single zone."

In addition to the in-game Cartoonival, the real-life fan convention event ToonFest (named after Disney's own 2006 event) has been held every year from 2015 to 2025, funded by Toons of the World volunteers. At ToonFest: Birthday Bash in 2023, the Rewritten team held a panel with original Toontown development team members, including Jesse Schell and former Disney Online VP Mike Goslin, in order to celebrate the 20th anniversary of Toontown.

In 2020, people took to the game to host virtual Black Lives Matter protests during the COVID-19 pandemic. Initially, some players were mistakenly warned for using the phrase, but the staff quickly updated the game to allow the messages.

== Reception ==
The initial reveal of Toontown Rewritten was met with skepticism; while fans of the original game were excited and optimistic, many also wondered if it could really happen and how long the project could last. After the server's launch, some fans felt that technological aspects made it that Rewritten could not fully capture the spirit of the original game. Others said that regardless of the technological aspects, the experience would always be different because of the original playerbase having grown up, and players from different time periods having different experiences with the game.

Reception in mainstream outlets has been primarily positive. Taylor describes feeling "a spark of joy in seeing something so dead feel so alive." Writing for Kotaku, Mike Fahey says "it's good to see an older MMO growing and improving under fan care years after the original creators left it for dead." Daphne Ford of Trill refers to the server's community as "especially compelling", and says the game's updates improve on its quality, calling the revamp of Sellbot Field Offices "a refreshing twist." Screen Rant's Nick Rodriguez says that the Rewritten team's efforts have "allowed the game to flourish into the 2020s." In a 2015 Destructoid article, Joe Parlock praises the project, adding "here's hoping it survives."

== See also ==
- Club Penguin Rewritten – 2017 video game
