= Ujan Ganger Naiya =

Television series

- Poster
- Genre: Social, drama
- Written by: Giasuddin Selim
- Directed by: Giasuddin Selim and Bashar Georgis
- Starring: Orchita Sporshia; Chanchal Chowdhury; Shamol Maula; Fazlur Rahman Babu; Quazi Nawshaba Ahmed; Dipa Khondokar; Wahida Mollick Jolly; Mamunur Rashid; Marufa Akter Jui; Jannatul Ferdoush Peya
- Voices of: Chirkut
- Theme music composer: Chirkut
- Country of origin: Bangladesh
- Original language: Bengali
- No. of seasons: 3
- No. of episodes: 47

Production
- Producer: Mazharul Islam
- Cinematography: Sheikh Rajibul Islam

Original release
- Network: BTV

Ujan Ganger Naiya is a drama series with underlying messages on the negative aspects of early marriages and underage pregnancy which was broadcast in 2014 by the BBC Media Action (BBCMA) Bangladesh. It was premiered on the state-owned television channel BTV and primarily targeted the rural populace of the country. The series was received exceedingly well, reaching 35 million people.

== Episodes ==
The 16-episode first series is directed by Giasuddin Selim and Bashar Georgis and written by Giasuddin Selim and a team of writers. The crew and cast features star performers like Mamunur Rashid, Fazlur Rahman Babu, Wahida Mollick Jolly, Chanchal Chowdhury, Dipa Khondokar, Orchita Sporshia, Quazi Nawshaba Ahmed, Shamol Mawla, Shahed Ali, Momena Chowdhury and many more.

Ujan Ganger Naiya is part of the BBC Agomoni (health project brand of BBC Media Action in Bangladesh) under which BBC Media Action is producing TV shows, radio programmes and Public Service Announcements.

== Plot ==
The plot centres around young sisters Jasmin and Anika, who are married to two brothers. 16-year-old Anika wants to continue her education and struggles to adapt to life as a wife and daughter-in-law. Through her story, the drama explores the challenges of early marriage and pregnancy. The series also attempts to promote healthier practices related to childbirth, such as having a skilled healthcare worker present at delivery. Season two follows Anika a few years later at she works as a healthcare worker in a different rural community.

== Cast ==
For first season 16 episodes

- Mamunur Rashid as Haider
- Fazlur Rahman Babu as Sultan
- Ishrat Nishat as Dadi
- Wahida Mollick Jolly as Sayeda
- Shilpi Akter Apu as Salma
- Chanchal Chowdhury as Arif
- Shamol Mawla as Halim
- Orchita Sporshia as Anika
- Marufa Akter Jui as Mou
- Shamima Nazneen as Rupa
- Deepa Khandakar as Marufa
- Sadika Swarna as Lata
- Shahed Ali as Jahir
- Jisan as Shahzada
- Shelly Ahsan as Banu
- Pankaj Mazumder as Sobhan
- Shirin Shahed Seunti as Rahela
- Md. Iqbal Hossain as Bacchu
- Anowarul Haque as Rashid

== Reception ==
The drama received praise for realistic onscreen portrayal of childbirth for the first time in Bangladeshi entertainment media.
