= Dard (2024 film) =

2024 Indo-Bangladeshi joint venture film by Anonno Mamun

- theatrical release poster
- Directed by: Anonno Mamun
- Written by: Anonno Mamun
- Screenplay by: Anonno Mamun; Prameet Ghosh
- Story by: Abdullah Zahir Babu
- Based on: Lipstick by Abdullah Zahir Babu
- Produced by: Kamal Mohammad Kibria; Anonno Mamun; Ashok Dhanuka; Himanshu Dhanuka; Karan Shah
- Starring: Shakib Khan; Sonal Chauhan; Payel Sarkar; Rahul Dev; Rajesh Sharma; Biswajit Chakraborty
- Cinematography: Venkatesh Gangadhari
- Edited by: Somnath Dey
- Music by: Arafat Mehmood
- Production companies: Action Cut Entertainment; Eskay Movies; Kibria Films; One World Movies
- Distributed by: Eskay Movies; Action Cut Entertainment
- Release dates: 15 November 2024 (Worldwide); 28 February 2025 (India)
- Running time: 149 minutes (Bengali); 147 minutes (Hindi)
- Countries: Bangladesh; India
- Languages: Bengali; Hindi
- Budget: ৳10 crore (US$810,000)
- Box office: ৳8.55 crore (US$700,000)

Dard (Note: transl. Sympathy; in Bengali titled as Dorod (transl. affection)) is a 2024 Indo-Bangladesh joint venture psychological romantic thriller film co-written, co-produced and directed by Anonno Mamun & produced by Kamal Mohammad Kibria Lipu, Ashok Dhanuka, Himanshu Dhanuka and Karan Shah under the banners of Action Cut Entertainment, Kibria Films, Eskay Movies and One World Movies respectively. Filmed simultaneously in Hindi and Bengali, with the latter being titled as Dorod (transl. Compassion). The film features Shakib Khan and Sonal Chauhan in the lead roles.

The film is marked Khan's 251th film. Dorod was released on 15 November 2024 in 22 countries across 257 theaters. Made on a production budget of ৳10 crore, the film is one the most expensive Bangladeshi film ever-made. Upon release, it received mixed reviews from critics. It stands as the third highest grossing Bangladeshi film of 2024.

== Plot ==
A series of sudden murders unfold in the city of Varanasi, targeting prominent individuals. The escalating violence shocks the local police as they grapple with the growing list of victims. As the investigation progresses, an auto driver named Dulu Mia emerges as the key suspect. The police must unravel the mystery behind the serial killings and uncover the motives driving these tragic events.

== Cast ==
- Shakib Khan as Dulal a.k.a. Dulu Miah/Dulu Rahaman, who is an auto driver
- Sonal Chauhan as Fatima, Dulu Miah's wife
- Payel Sarkar as Agni, Investigating Officer
- Rahul Dev as Superstar Sarfaraz Khan
- Rajesh Sharma as Film Producer Shawkat
- Biswajit Chakraborty as Doctor Mizanur Rahman
- Alok Jain as Film Director Liaqat
- Elina Shammi as Bonna, Assistant Investigating Officer
- Farhan Khan Rio as Akash, Assistant Investigating Officer
- Imtu Ratish as John, Sharfaraz Khan's Assistant
- Safa Marua as Actress Trina Ahsan
- Turin Islam

== Production ==
=== Development ===
Around three hundred cast and crew are working on the film.

=== Pre-production ===
The film was initially slated to begin filming on 20 October 2023 in Varanasi and Prayagraj in India. Bangladeshi actor Shakib Khan was supposed to participate in the shooting that day as the film's protagonist. He was scheduled to go to Mumbai on 15 October, to participate in the pre-production work. His photoshoots, script reading sessions, look sets were scheduled to take place in Mumbai before the filming began in Varanasi, India. However, the entire unit of 14 including Shakib Khan did not receive work permit visa on time from Bangladesh and could not travel to India at the scheduled time.

On 21 October, one of the film's producers Kamal Mohammad Kibria Lipu, told Prothom Alo, "All the artists who will go to India for the shooting of this film, including Shakib Khan, have applied to the ministry for work permit visas. But the visas have not been approved yet." The next day on 22 October, the entire unit of the film, including Shakib Khan, got visas. Which was confirmed by Lipu and director Anonno Mamun to Prothom Alo. Then on 24 October, Shakib Khan went to Mumbai to participate in the pre-production work.

On 25 October 2023, the film's press meet was held at a hotel in Mumbai which was attended by lead actors Shakib Khan, Sonal Chauhan, director Anonno Mamun and one of producers Kamal Mohammad Kibria Lipu. Anonno Mamun confirmed that the film was being made on a budget more than ৳10 crore. Shakib Khan went to Varanasi from Mumbai on 26 October to participate in the shooting.

=== Casting ===
After the success of Shakib Khan's previous film Priyotoma (2023), director Anonno Mamun announced a film with Khan. He said that the heroine will be from Bollywood. The film was initially rumored to be titled Psychopath and Darad and the names of some Bollywood actresses including Prachi Desai, Neha Sharma, Zareen Khan and Shehnaaz Gill were also rumored. In the late-July 2023, it was reported that Aamir Khan's brother Faisal Khan will star in the film, which was confirmed by the director to Prothom Alo. The director confirmed to the media that Faisal Khan has been signed for the film. However, Faisal Khan denied this and said that it is unprofessional to use his name in the media without any agreement.

After many rumours, the lead actress was signed for the film in the late September or early October, Sonal Chauhan was named as the lead actress, which was confirmed by Eskay Movies, one of the film's Indian production companies, on 6 October to Prothom Alo. On the same day, the director revealed the names of the other cast members of the film, including Payel Sarkar, Misha Sawdagor, Lutfur Rahman George, Rajesh Sharma, Debachandrima Singh Roy, Elina Shammi, Imtu Ratish, Farhan Khan Rio. The director confirmed to the media that Payel Sarkar will play a brave police official and Debachandrima Singh Roy will play a model. Then on 8 October, Shakib Khan was officially signed as the lead actor of the film. After the singing, the final script of the film was handed over to him by director Anonno Mamun, and the Bangladeshi producers Sarder Saniat Hossain and Kamal Mohammad Kibria Lipu. The following day, on 9 October, veteran Indian actor Rahul Dev, who had previously collaborated with Khan in the 2016 film Shikari, joined the cast. Two days later, on 11 October, Miss Bangladesh 2017 crown-holder Jessia Islam signed up for a guest appearance in the film, her second film, and is scheduled to participate in the filming for 10 days.

A rising fashion-model from Bangladesh Safa Marua stars in the film, and shot for a total of 16 days in Varanasi.

=== Filming ===
The principal photography began on 27 October 2023 in Varanasi, Uttar Pradesh, India. On the same day, the director revealed a behind the scenes look of the film on his Facebook account. On the second day of its filming on 28 October, Shakib Khan shot for around 18 hours continuously. On 7 November, during filming, 70 percent crew of the unit including protagonists Shakib Khan, Sonal Chauhan and director Anonna Mamun, were infected with fever. However, the director continued filming. The Daily Star reported that director Mamun confirmed that a romantic song featuring Khan and Chauhan was shot in Varanasi on 9 November. On the same day, Channel i revealed some stills from the song, which Mamun had sent to Channel i Online. The film's Indian portion was wrapped up on 17 November 2023. It was shot for 22 consecutive days in India, with a cast and crew of over three hundred every day.

== Soundtrack ==
Dard

Soundtrack album by Arafat Mehmood
- Released: 15 November 2024
- Recorded: 2023–2024
- Genre: Film soundtrack
- Length: 14:04
- Language: Bengali
- Label: T-Series
- Producer: Arafat Mahmood
External audio
- Official Audio Jukebox on YouTube

Singles from Dard
- 1. "Ei Bhasao" Released: 11 November 2024; 2. "Lut Korecho" Released: 14 November 2024; 3. "Ek Prem" Released: 18 November 2024

The film's soundtrack is composed by Arafat Mehmood and lyrics for the Hindi version are penned by himself and for the Bengali version by Zahid Akbar, Shomeshwar Oli and SK Dip.

All music is composed by Arafat Mehmood.

Bengali
No.	Title	Lyrics	Music	Singer(s)	Length
1.	"Ei Bhasao"	Arafat Mehmood, Zahid Akbar	Arafat Mehmood	Balam, Konal	3:49
2.	"Lut Koreso"	Arafat Mehmood, Asif Iqbal	Arafat Mehmood	Mainul Ahsan Noble	2:39
3.	"Ek Prem"	Shomeshwar Oli	Arafat Mehmood	Imran Mahmudul	3:18
4.	"Ore Pagol Mon"	Jalal Chowdhury	Savvy	Mainul Ahsan Noble & Konal	2:45
Total length:					9:46

All music is composed by Arafat Mehmood.

Hindi
No.	Title	Lyrics	Music	Singer(s)	Length
1.	"Jism Mein Tere"	Arafat Mehmood	Arafat Mehmood	Mohammed Irfan, Rubai	3:49
2.	"Loot Le Tu"	Arafat Mehmood	Arafat Mehmood	Nakash Aziz	2:39
3.	"Zindagi Tujhse"	Arafat Mehmood	Arafat Mehmood	Raj Barman, Dixant Shaurya	3:26
Total length:					9:54

== Marketing ==
The first look poster of the film was revealed on 14 February 2024 on the occasion of Valentine's Day. The official merchandise of the film was launched by Qcoom on 13 March 2024.

Anonno Mamun had previously stated that a 20-second promo of the trailer will be unveiled at the Burj Khalifa in Dubai in February 2024 but it did not happen.

A fifty foot long cut-out poster was revealed on 21 October 2024 in Keraniganj, Dhaka.

== Release ==
On 25 October 2023, at film's press meet director Anonno Mamun confirmed that the film will be released in more than 30 countries in six languages including Bengali, Hindi, Tamil, Telugu, Malayalam and Kannada in the first week of February 2024. Ultimately, it was not released on the scheduled date as the post-production work was not completed on time. Then no new date announce until July 2024, where it says to release on 6 September 2024. But it was not released on 6 September 2024.

After several delays, the film was finally released on 15 November 2024, simultaneously in 257 theaters across 22 countries, including Bangladesh, the United States, and Canada.

The film was released on Channel i's OTT platform, iScreen, on 16 January 2025. It is scheduled for release in Indian theaters on 28 February 2025. Also its world television premiere aired on Channel i on the second day of Eid-ul-Fitr in 2025.

=== Pre-release business ===
Two days before its release, on 13 November 2024, advance ticket sales for the film began in multiplexes. Initially scheduled for 22 shows daily across all branches of Star Cineplex from the first day of release, the Cineplex authorities added four more shows on the first day due to high demand in advance ticket sales. Additionally, advance ticket sales began at Lion Cinemas in Keraniganj, CineScope in Narayanganj, as well as Modhuban Cineplex in Bogura and Sugandha in Chattogram, according to reports.

== Reception ==
=== Audiences and box office ===
The film received a roaring response at box office on its opening in Bangladesh. According to Independent TV, citing Star Cineplex authorities and the film's director Anonno Mamun, Dard set the record for highest first-day ticket sales at multiplexes among all films released this year. On its opening day, only Star Cineplex chain sold tickets worth ৳30.68 lakh, surpassing the ৳29.61 lakh earned by Toofan, which was released during Eid al-Adha 2024. According to a report by Prothom Alo, director Anonno Mamun stated with a Facebook post that the film has earned ৳3.12 crore (US$250,000) within its first two days. However, he did not disclose the film's total earnings afterward.

=== Critical reception ===
Nur Islam Tipu of Independent TV rated Dard 3.75/5, calling it a gripping psychological thriller. He praised Shakib Khan's exceptional performance as Dulu Mia, a complex character driven by obsessive love, and highlighted the intense second half and emotional climax. Despite a slow first half and minor narrative flaws, Tipu noted the film's strong music and intriguing storytelling, making it a standout entry in Dhallywood. Rahman Moti of Bangla Movie Database rated the film 7.5/10, calling it "a bold experiment" in Shakib Khan's career. He praised Khan's performance as "a one-man show" and highlighted the fresh theme of "Celebrity worship syndrome." While noting the slow first half, Moti commended the film's climax and Khan's acting, calling it one of his career-best performances. Shadique Mahbub Islam of The Business Standard called the film "a wasted opportunity," criticizing its "incoherent plot" and "poor directorial work." While praising Shakib Khan's performance as "committed and heartfelt," he found the supporting cast lackluster and the screenplay "nonsensical." Islam concluded that despite its potential, the film felt "rushed and incomplete." Ahsan Kabir of Bangla Tribune criticized the film as "formulaic and riddled with inconsistencies," describing it as "a film that glamorizes violence without offering depth." While acknowledging Khan's performance as "natural and fitting," Kabir pointed out that the supporting cast's delivery lacked emotional coherence, particularly Sonal Chauhan's dialogue synchronization. He further noted that the screenplay was "sluggish and repetitive," failing to create a compelling narrative for a psychological thriller. Kabir concluded that despite its aspirations as a pan-Indian film, Dard suffered from "poor cinematography, outdated aesthetics, and a weak script" that may not resonate with audiences like Khan's recent successes. Film journalist Mahfuzur Rahman focused on similarly of the movie with Lipstick, but clarified that the storytelling of Dard is different.
