= Orchita Sporshia =

Bangladeshi film actress and film maker

- অর্চিতা স্পর্শিয়া
- Born: December 8, 1993 (age 32); Dhaka, Bangladesh
- Education: University of Liberal Arts Bangladesh
- Occupation: Actress
- Years active: 2011–present
- Spouse: Syed Rifath Noweid Hussain (m. 2024)

Orchita Sporshia (born 8 December 1993), renowned as Sporshia, is a Bangladeshi film actress and film maker who predominantly works in the Bangladesh entertainment industry since 2011. She is regarded as one of the highest-paid leading actresses in Bangladesh and has appeared in films, series, and more than 150 single episode television dramas, short films, and telefilms. She has performed in notable works including Shubornopur, Shaola and the BBC-produced Ujan Ganger Naiya, for which she gained her first critical acclaim.

Sporshia is known for portraying complex and resilient female characters, earning multiple accolades including the Meril Prothom Alo Award and the CJFB Award. Her notable films include Abar Boshonto, Kathbirali, Sincerely Yours, Dhaka, Manusher Bagan, and Nabab LLB. In addition to feature films and government-grant projects, she has successfully ventured into OTT platforms. She also owns the production company Kochchop Films.

Throughout her career, she has been a prominent brand ambassador for numerous brands including Airtel, Samsung Mobile, Parachute Hair oil, Foster Clarks, Pran, Vision Electronics, Tecno, Shahjadi Mehedi, and Oppo.

== Early life ==
Sporshia was born on 8 December 1993 in Dhaka, Bangladesh. She is the only child of her parents and was raised by her mother after her father, a businessman, divorced and left the family when she was one year old. Her mother, Suzan Haque, is a former journalist and author who is also involved in social welfare work for underprivileged women and orphans. Sporshia has described her mother’s resilience in interviews, calling herself the proud daughter of a “warrior.” Her maternal grandfather and great-grandfather were zamindars of Old Dhaka.

Sporshia developed an interest in art, literature, and cinema from an early age. She trained in multiple dance forms, including classical, salsa, bachata, and contemporary dance. She completed her primary education at Cephalon International School in Dhaka, followed by O-level and A-level qualifications under the Pearson Edexcel London Examination Board. She later enrolled at the University of Liberal Arts Bangladesh (ULAB), where she pursued a Bachelor's degree in Media Studies and Journalism with a concentration in Digital Production.

To support herself and her mother alongside her studies, Sporshia began working at the age of fourteen. She initially taught art to children and provided private tuition before entering the entertainment industry. In 2023, on her 30th birthday, she announced her decision to make a posthumous body donation to Dhaka Medical College for medical research and organ transplantation.

== Career ==
Sporshia worked as an art director at Studio ASH and an assistant director for Apple Box Films Ltd. and Runout Films Ltd. before she started acting. She currently owns the production company Kochchop Films. In 2020, she portrayed a rape survivor in Anonno Mamun's fictional courtroom drama Nabab LLB, starring opposite Shakib Khan for the first time.

Sporshia began her career in the media industry at a young age, initially aiming to be a filmmaker. She unexpectedly transitioned into acting in 2011 after appearing in an Airtel commercial. That same year, she made her acting debut in Arunodoyer Tarun Dol, which earned her widespread recognition.

Between 2011 and 2018, she appeared in over 120 single-episode television dramas. Notable works from this period include Impossible Five, Subornopur Beshi Dure Noy, Shaola, and Humayun Ahmed’s Jori Kingba Minur Golpo. Other significant credits include Ragging, Oshohay, Crazy Lover, Evergreen, Windchime, Prempotro, Probashi Jamai, Ami Tumi ar Othoi, Fast Forward, Journey by Romance, 18+, Durutto, Bondhon, Kolshi, Nishongo Sherpa, Love Will Turn, Chokro, Mayer Biye, Algorithm, Prank, Ki Kotha Tahar Sathe, and Helicopter.

In addition to telefilms, she acted in several television series, most notably the BBC-produced Ujan Ganger Naiya (Seasons 1 and 2). Her other series work includes Rod, Side Effects, Amader Chhoto Nodi Chole Bakey Bakey, Vanity Bag, Family Pack, Torun Turki, and Warisnama. She has also appeared in music videos and short films, including A Perfect Murder, Bandhobi, Columbus, Obishash, Obosheshe, Itish Pitish, and The Day of Love, the latter of which was recognized at the Kinoproba Film Festival in Russia.

=== Transition to film and OTT (2018–2022) ===
In 2018, Sporshia shifted her focus from television dramas to feature films and OTT platforms. Her debut feature film, Abar Boshonto (2019), directed by Anonno Mamun, earned her critical acclaim and several honors, including the Meril Prothom Alo Award and the CJFB Performance Award for Best Actress. That same year, she starred in Sincerely Yours, Dhaka (2019), Bangladesh’s first anthology film. The project premiered at the Busan International Film Festival and was later screened at over 20 international festivals, eventually becoming Bangladesh's official entry for the 93rd Academy Awards.

In January 2020, she received widespread appreciation for her performance in the film Kathbirali, which achieved both critical and commercial success. During the COVID-19 pandemic, she starred in Chhok (2020), which was released directly on OTT. In 2021, she portrayed a rape survivor in the courtroom drama Nabab LLB, starring opposite Shakib Khan. While the film's depiction of certain legal procedures generated social media controversy, Sporshia's performance was lauded by critics for its emotional depth. The same year, she appeared in the films Manusher Bagan and Bandhan.

Throughout this period, Sporshia established a strong presence in the digital space with notable performances in several web series, including Paanch Phoron (2021, Hoichoi), Bou Diaries (2021, Bioscope), Nikhoj (2022, Chorki), Makal (2022, Bioscope), Isaac Liton (2022, Binge), Asharer Golpo (2022, Bioscope), and Bodh (2022, Hoichoi).

Beyond acting, she served as an Executive Producer for the government-grant film Dawal, directed by Picklu Chowdhury. She was also an active partner and creative producer at the production firm Creative Company until its closure in 2024.\

=== Recent projects and return to television (2023–present) ===
In 2023, Sporshia briefly returned to television with the drama Laal Mangsher Jhol, for which she won both the BIFA Award and the CJFB Performance Award for Best Actress. That year, she appeared in three feature films: the government-grant productions Phire Dekha and Khoma Nei, and the film Ekhanei Nongor (released on Rtv Plus). Ekhanei Nongor later received an official selection at the 23rd Dhaka International Film Festival in 2025. On digital platforms, she starred in Open Kitchen (2023, Bongo) and the web series The Holy Gun.

In 2024, she appeared in the murder-mystery web series Roilo Baki Dosh on the Toffee platform. Responding to audience demand, Sporshia made a significant return to single-episode television dramas (natoks). Her performance in the special drama Noor earned her a nomination at the CJFB Performance Awards and a win for Best Actress at the 23rd Dhallywood Film and Music Awards in New York. Other successful projects from this period include Sweet Family, Payel, Mayamoyi, Ei Golper Naam Ki, Juta Nij Dayitte Rakhiben, Miracle Love, Ex-boyfriend, Rupkothar Moto, Protidan, and Sheshta Tumi.

In late 2025, it was announced that Sporshia had joined the cast of Bangladesh's most popular sitcom, Bachelor Point (Season 5), playing a brand-new character named "Sporsho." She is also set to portray the female lead in Laal Mia, a biopic based on the life of legendary painter S. M. Sultan, directed by Nurul Alam Atique.

== Personal life ==
On 14 February 2024, Sporshia married Syed Rifath Noweid Hussain, a tech entrepreneur who serves as the Founder and CBO of a software company based in Dover, USA. The destination wedding was held at Inani Beach in Cox’s Bazar, attended by close family and friends.

On 8 December 2023, her 30th birthday, Sporshia officially announced her decision to make a posthumous body donation to Dhaka Medical College Hospital. She stated that her organs would be used for transplantation and medical research to benefit others after her death.

== Filmography ==
| Year | Film | Role | Director | Notes |
|---|---|---|---|---|
| 2017 | Bandhan | | | |
| 2019 | Sincerely Yours | Syed Ahmed Shawki | Anonno Mamun | |
| 2019 | Abar Boshonto | Tithi Mostafa | Anonno Mamun | |
| 2019 | Iti, Tomari Dhaka | | Various | |
| 2020 | Kathbirali | Kajal | Niamul Mukta | |
| 2020 | Nabab LLB | Ifrat Afrin Shuvra | Anonno Mamun | iTheatre film |
| 2021 | Manusher Bagan | | Nurul Alam | |
| 2021 | Chok | | Golam Sohrab Dodul | Web Film |
| 2023 | Ekhane Nongor | Komola | Mehedi Rony | Released on Rtv Plus |
| 2023 | Fire Dekha | Nasima | Rozina | |
| 2023 | Khoma Nei | | Z. H. Mintu | |

== Television ==
- Ujan Ganger Naiya (2014, BTV)
- Amader Choto Nodi Chole Bake Bake (2014, Channel i)
- Orunodoyer Torun Dol
- Torun Turkey (2016, NTV)
- Icche Ghuri (2017, NTV)
- Evergreen (2017, ETV)
- Golmele Nepale (2018)
- Impossible 5
- Bachelor Point Season 5 (2025-2026)

=== Web series ===
| Year | Title | OTT | Character | Co-Artist | Director | Notes |
|---|---|---|---|---|---|---|
| 2018 | Abashik Hotel | | | Tawsif Mahbub, Shamim Hasan Sarkar, Raha Tanha Khan, Tamim Mridha, Zaki | Imraul Rafat | |
| 2020 | Paanch Phoron | Hoichoi | | Yash Rohan, Tariq Anam Khan, Fazlur Rahman Babu | Nurul Alam Atique | |
| 2021 | Bou Diaries | Bioscope | | Yash Rohan | Sameer Ahmed | |
| 2022 | Nikhoj | Chorki | | | Reehan Rahman | |
| 2022 | Makal | Bioscope | | | Animesh Aich | |
| 2022 | Isaac Liton | Binge | | | Ashrafuzzaman | |
| 2022 | Ashar Galpo | Bioscope | | | Animesh Aich | |
| 2022 | Bodh | HoiChoi | | | Amitabh Reza Chowdhury | |
| 2023 | Open Kitchen | Bongo | | | Imraul Rafat | |
| 2023 | The Holy Gun | | | | Yasir Arafat Jewel | |
| 2024 | Roilo Baki Dosh | Toffee | | | Sabin Khan | |

=== Music video ===
| Year | Title | Singer | Co-Artist | Director | Notes |
|---|---|---|---|---|---|
| 2013 | Prothoma | Tamim | | | |
| 2014 | Tomar Chhobi | Limon Chowdhury | | | |
| 2015 | Naam Ki Tomar | Nancy and Kazi Shuvo | | | |
| 2015 | Tori Majhe | Belal Khan and Jhilik | | | |
| 2016 | Tomar Choya | Tamim | | | |
| 2016 | Jonmokotha | Shahrukh Kabir | | | |
| 2016 | Mon Doriya | Papon and Dola | ABM Sumon | Taneem Rahman Angshu | |
| 2016 | Tomay Niye | Piran Khan | Tamim Mridha | Imraul Rafat | |
| 2017 | Haralo Ojanaay | Naheed Mehedi | Tawsif Mahbub | Taneem Rahman Angshu | |
| 2017 | Bondhu | Chirkutt feat Konal | Tasnuva Tisha & Sabbir Arnob | Imraul Rafat | |
| 2017 | Ami Kemon kore Potro Likhi | Mujib Pardeshi and Salma | | | |
| 2017 | Ei Brishti Bheja Raate | Artcell | | | |
| 2018 | Chayer Cup E Tumul Bristy | Peal Hasan | Sumit Sengupta | Saikat Nasir | |
| 2021 | Ashchhe Maa Durga | Puja | | | |
| 2021 | Kara Nilo Lut Kore | Armaan and Kabir Sumon | | | |
| 2025 | BPL Dhaka Capital’s Theme Song | Pritom Hasan | | | |

=== Short films ===
| Title | Character | Co-Artist | Director | Notes |
|---|---|---|---|---|
| A Perfect Murder | | | Ashwash Chowdhury | |
| Bandhobi | | | Vicky Zahed | |
| Columbus | | | Tanim Noor | |
| Obishash | | | Vicky Zahed | |
| Obosheshe | | | Nizamuddin Rony | |
| Itish Pitish | | | Imraul Rafat | |
| The Day of Love | | | Riad Arfin | |
| Fruit Cake | | | Kazi Sami Hasan | |
| Ki Kotha Tahar Sathe | | | Masum Pradhan | |

== Controversy ==
In renowned filmmaker Anonno Mamun's film, Nabab LLB, she portrayed as a rape survivor who was harshly interrogated by a cop.
