= Imtu Ratish =

Bangladeshi model, anchor and actor

Imtu Ratish Imtiaz
- ইমতু রাতিশ
- Born: February 26, 1987 (age 38)
- Occupation: Acting
- Years active: 2006 - present

Imtu Ratish (born February 26, 1987) is a Bangladeshi model, anchor, and actor. He made his big screen debut with the film Joiboti Koinnar Mon (2021) directed by Nargis Akhtar.

== Early life ==
Ratish was born on February 26, 1987.

== Career ==
Imtu Ratish began his career with modelling in 2006 by Amitabh Reza. He performed as host in Ekushey TV's special show 'Iftar Hat'. He worked regularly on various types of advertising and music videos. He was the host of Bangladeshi Idol. He appeared in Ekushey Television's film-related show Cine Hits as a regular anchor. He appeared in Ekushey Television's film related show Cine Hits as a regular anchor. Also, he appeared in ATN Bangla TV's show Chayer Chumuke. He received state-level invitation from the Malaysian and Nepali governments as a guest media person to host a show. He is the only media personality of Bangladesh who has been invited there.

In 2016, he made his big screen debut in the film Joiboti Koinnar Mon directed by Nargis Akhtar, which was a government funded film. He appeared in his second film Abar Basanta, directed by Anonno Mamun, in 2019. He acted also in the Netflix web series Ting Tang. In addition, he has performed numerous television dramas and some web series.

== Filmography ==
Year	Films	Role	Notes	Ref.
2019	Abar Boshonto	Imran Chowdhury's son	Debut film	
2021	Joiboti Koinnar Mon	Chairman's son		
2024	Dard	John	Indo-Bangladesh joint production	

=== Television ===
Year	Drama	Role	Notes	Ref.
2017–2018	Palki	Sohel	Premiered on Deepto TV	
