= Club Penguin Rewritten =

2017 video game

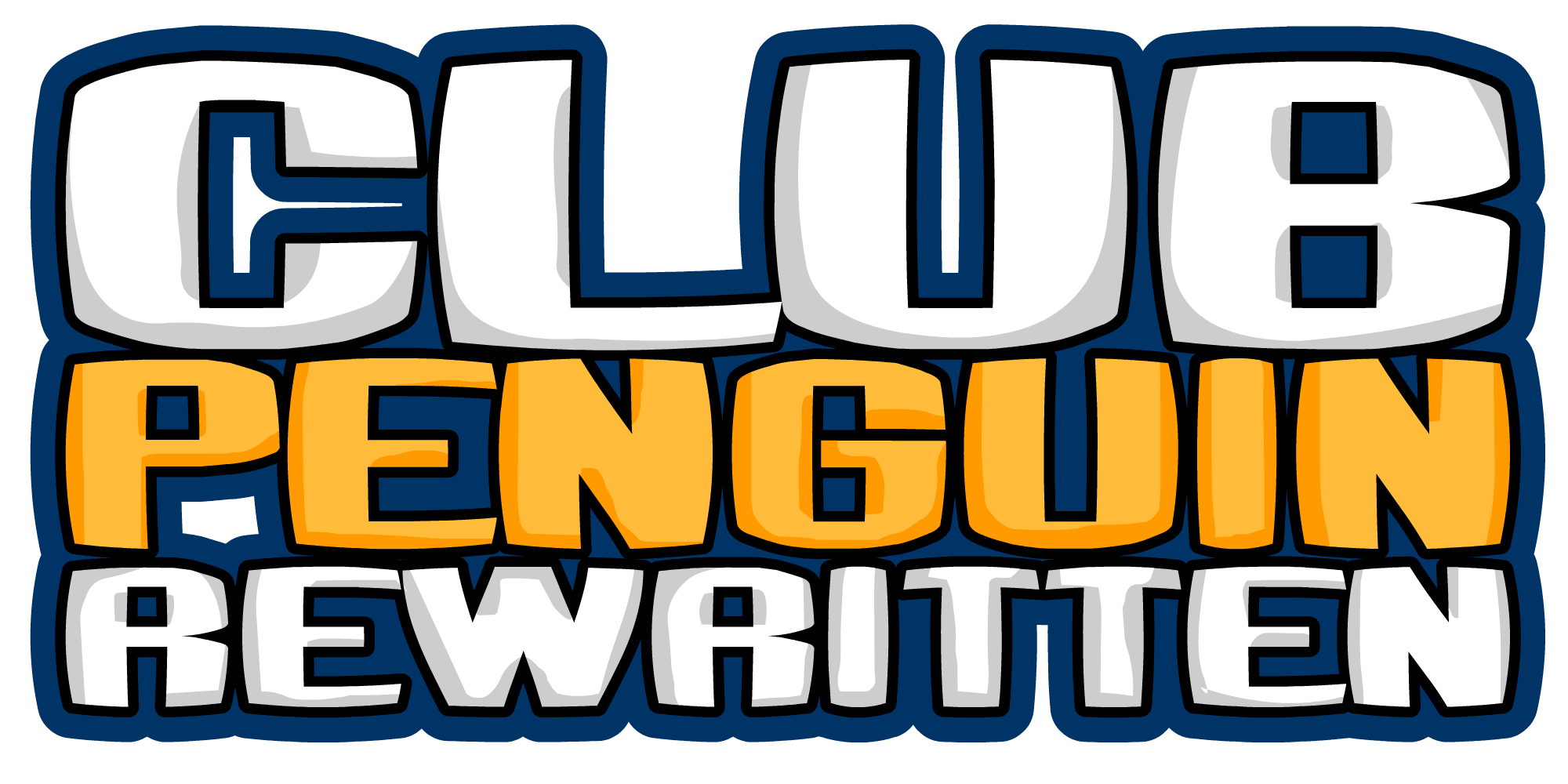
- Type: Massively multiplayer online game
- Launch date: February 12, 2017; 9 years ago
- Discontinued: April 13, 2022; 4 years ago
- Platform(s): Online (Adobe Flash, HTML5 client); later standalone HTML5
- Website: Club Penguin Rewritten website at the Wayback Machine (archived April 12, 2022)

Club Penguin Rewritten was a 2017 fan game based on the original game, Club Penguin. It was created by two indie developers as an alternative to the original game, which had been shut down by Disney on March 30, 2017. As a voluntary project, Rewritten had in-game items once limited to paid members in Club Penguin available to everyone in the game. After Club Penguin ceased operations, the development team for Rewritten expanded. The game was built on pre-existing Flash files and simulated older versions of the original game but was distinct through its absence of in-game purchases.

Club Penguin Rewritten was launched on February 12, 2017. The game accumulated a large online community in relation to the consequences and restrictions from the COVID-19 pandemic. Teens and young adults who played the original game used it to host in-game events during the pandemic. As it provided escapism, Rewritten was subject to speedruns and a virtual concert for Soccer Mommy's album Color Theory. During this time, a staff member reported that the game averaged 30,000 new registered users daily. Rewritten was praised for its nostalgic environment, as well as its focus on the community and player freedom. The remake was recognized by Lance Priebe, one of the developers of Club Penguin, in which he respected the social impact the game brought during the pandemic.

The fan game was shut down on April 13, 2022, due to a full request by Disney. The website was taken over by the City of London Police in order to continue a copyright investigation. Three suspects were arrested. Prior to its shutdown, the game had accumulated over 11 million registered users.

== Gameplay and development ==
Rewritten simulated older versions of the original game

Club Penguin Rewritten was an identical recreation of Club Penguin, a massively multiplayer online game developed by New Horizon Interactive and acquired by Disney in 2007. It featured much of the same gameplay and policies, including a dedicated moderation team and a chat filtering system. The main attraction of the game was the absence of a paid membership, which allowed players to collect any in-game item for free. Rewritten simulated earlier versions of Club Penguin commonly labeled as "AS2" by the community. The New Statesman reported Rewritten's gameplay as having fewer restrictions, older game mechanics, and servers that could support up to two million concurrent players at a time.

Rewritten was developed voluntarily by fans of the original game. It was created by two semi-anonymous developers known as Codey and Hagrid, who were EU-based students at the time of its creation. The developers had previously gained experience developing their own projects and offered Rewritten as freeware. Working without permission from Disney, one of the main goals of establishing Rewritten was to preserve the original game. The foundation of the game was developed by restoring the original Flash source code. After Club Penguin shut down on March 30, 2017, Rewritten's development gained prominence and media attention. At that point, the development team claimed that Rewritten fell under fair use protections in the United States. At Rewritten's legal page, a disclaimer was given, calling the game an "independent recreation of Disney's Club Penguin" and "not affiliated with Disney Interactive or Club Penguin Inc.". After Club Penguin's shutdown, the Rewritten team expanded and began supporting email troubleshooting and moderation. In a written response to the New Statesman via Twitter, the developers of Rewritten said that they wanted to ensure the gameplay experience would be enjoyable, safe, and appealing to a nostalgic audience or those who want to interact with others globally. In order to achieve this, the game would strive to be "as authentic as possible", while including new features to maintain interest.

== Release and reception ==
Club Penguin Rewritten was launched on February 12, 2017. New York reported that Rewritten saw an influx of users during the COVID-19 pandemic, calling it a "thriving fandom". The game consisted of teens and young adults that had played the original game, who used the remake as a way of escapism from the pandemic. Rewritten leaned into its user growth by hosting virtual recreations of events such as proms and graduation ceremonies that had been cancelled as a result of the pandemic. The Hollywood Reporter described the demographics of Rewritten as primarily being high school and college students. The majority of Rewritten players were based in the United States. The game reached 100,000 registered players in April and one million registered players on October 4 of the same year.

Kotaku described the game as the most popular private server, a term used to describe recreations of Club Penguin, and highlighted the game's speedrunning community. The shutdown of other private servers contributed to Rewritten's growing popularity, such as the closure of Club Penguin Online in 2020. On April 3, 2020, singer-songwriter Soccer Mommy hosted a virtual concert for her album Color Theory through the site as part of an internet trend of musical video game performances influenced by the pandemic. Allison stated that Club Penguin was "a game that everyone remembers [as] a kid", and alluded to the nostalgic desire to play the game during the pandemic: "I feel like a lot of people were also doing the same thing I was doing: logging back on when we were all stuck inside, and playing [...] just for fun."

At an interview with The Hollywood Reporter, Lance Priebe, one of the developers of Club Penguin, praised Rewritten's use of communication during the pandemic. In March 2020, a Rewritten staff member said that the game was receiving 30,000 new users every day. The developers described Rewritten's culture as revolving around social media phenomena such as Vine, and classic in-game trends such as "tipping the iceberg". In April 2020, Disney sent a DMCA notice to Google with concerns over the Club Penguin Rewritten domain, which they claimed infringed upon the Club Penguin trademark. A second notice was filed a month later. Google did not respond to or address Disney's request. By late 2020, Rewritten was estimated to have eight million registered users.

== Shutdown ==
On April 13, 2022, Club Penguin Rewritten was shut down by the City of London Police. The main page was replaced with a disclaimer reading that "This site has been taken over by Operation Creative, Police Intellectual Property Crime Unit (PIPCU)." Rewritten moderator Thorn gave a notice through the game's official Discord server, stating that the game was "shutting down effective immediately due to a full request by Disney". The game was being investigated for copyright violations after the developers had granted the police control over the website. Detective Constable Daryl Fryatt of the PIPCU confirmed that on April 12, 2022, three suspects related to the game were arrested on "suspicion of distributing materials infringing copyright". It was reported that the suspects were released two days later to provide assistance in the copyright investigation.

Rewritten had over 11 million registered users and 140,000 members on its Discord server after its shutdown. Slate reported that other private servers experienced an increase in registration afterwards, and players noted that the game had briefly included advertising in exchange for an in-game reward. Rewritten moderator BigChun confirmed that advertisements were placed in the game since mid-2020, as "running a game like this costs money". In response, Lane Merrifield, one of the three co-founders of Club Penguin, opined on Twitter that Disney did not understand "that controlling IP at the expense of the community will devalue it, not preserve it". Lance Priebe, another Club Penguin co-founder, praised the community Rewritten established, however expressed concerns over child safety in private servers. American streamer Ludwig Ahgren opined that the shutdown was too extreme for a children's game, calling it "overkill".

== See also ==
- Impact of the COVID-19 pandemic on the video game industry
- Intellectual property protection of video games
- Toontown Rewritten
