= Makeup (2021 film) =

2025 Bangladeshi film

- Poster
- Directed by: Anonno Mamun
- Screenplay by: Anonno Mamun
- Story by: Anonno Mamun
- Produced by: Celebrity Production
- Starring: Tariq Anam Khan; Ziaul Roshan; Nipa Ahmed Realy
- Cinematography: Venkat Gangadhari; Razu Raz; Mithu Monir
- Edited by: Anoy Shohag
- Production company: Celebrity Production
- Distributed by: iTheatre
- Release dates: 21 March 2021 (OTT); 10 January 2025 (Cinemas)
- Running time: 143 minutes
- Country: Bangladesh
- Language: Bengali

Makeup is a 2025 Bangladeshi film written, directed and produced by Anonno Mamun under the banner of Celebrity Productions. The film was released on OTT service iTheater on 21 March 2021 and in theatres on 10 January 2025.

The first film to be acted by Nipa Ahmed Reli and it is the first film to be produced by Celebrity Production House. It is the 11th film directed by Anonno Mamun.

== Plot ==
Film actors do not bring their personal lives to the public for the sake of their careers. They keep their family lives hidden, thinking only of their careers. At the end of the day, everyone takes off their makeup and returns to their relatives and their own addresses, where instead of makeup, there is a common person.

== Cast ==
- Tariq Anam Khan as Shahbaz Khan
- Ziaul Roshan as Pavel
- Nipa Ahmed Realy as Munni
- Payel Mukherjee
- Biswajit Chakraborty
- Trambak Roy Chowdhury
- Kazi Uzzal
- Pooja
- Tania
- Turin
- Nomoni

== Production ==
The film, which was made on a budget of Rs 4 crore began shooting in Sunamganj on 2 July 2019. The film was then shot in Manikganj, Dhaka and in India at Ramoji Film Studios and Kolkata. The film was dubbed in Bengali and Hindi. The song shooting was planned to take place in Dubai.

=== Post-production ===
On 15 February 2021, the Bangladesh Film Censor Board declared the film Makeup 'unfit for screening' for allegedly 'negatively portraying' the film industry.

== Music ==
The film has four songs. The songs are written by Zahid Akbar, Savvy, Lincoln and Anonno Mamun. The songs are sung by Imran, Nancy and Shithi Saha, Avanti.

== Release ==
The film's official promotion began on October 6, 2019. Initially planned for an October 2019 release, the film was later extended to November 15, 2019, with a theatrical release and a digital release. On March 21, 2021, the film was released on video-on-demand service iTheatre.

It was released in 23 theaters in Bangladesh on January 10, 2025.

== Legal issues ==
9 February 2021, Khorshed Alam Khosru, a member of the Bangladesh Film Censor Board and president of the Producers Association, has been banned the film to release in cinemas due to its badly portrayal of the people of film industry. Then the director of the film and the managing director of iTheatre Anonno Mamun, released the film on the OTT platform iTheatre on 21 March 2021. In 23 March 2021, Anonno Mamun says "We will appeal to the Bangladesh Film Censor Board to release the film in cinemas" and the film screened at the inaugural screening at the Zahir Raihan Color Lab Auditorium of the Bangladesh Film Development Corporation.

In 2024, the film has been banned from being released in cinemas for the second time after the producer of the film filed an appeal for violating the Bangladesh Film Certification Act. After the change of government on August 5, a new application was made to release this film in cinemas and it was granted permission to be released, and a 1 minute 20 second scene was cut from the film.
