= CT-Cyber Crime Investigation, Dhaka Metropolitan Police =

Branch of Bangladesh Police

CT-Cyber Crime Investigation

Agency overview
- Formed: 16 February 2016
- Employees: 100

Jurisdictional structure
- Operations jurisdiction: Bangladesh
- General nature: Civilian police

Operational structure
- Headquarters: 36 Minto Road, Ramna, Dhaka
- Agency executive: A F M Al Kibria, Deputy Commissioner of Police
- Parent agency: Dhaka Metropolitan Police

Website
- cttcdmp.gov.bd

The CT-Cyber Crime Investigation, formerly the Cyber Security & Crime Division, commonly known as the Cyber Crime Unit, is a division of the Counter Terrorism and Transnational Crime branch operated by the Dhaka Metropolitan Police. The main function of this division is to counter terrorism in cyber space. It also patrols, prevents, detects and investigates cyber-terrorism and cyber-crime in Dhaka.

== History ==
This division commenced its operation on 16 February 2016. Amidst the rise of cyber crimes and cyber bullying in Bangladesh, the policy makers took initiative to launch this dedicated Cyber Crime Division for Dhaka intended to address digital crimes including online harassment, hacking, financial fraud and many more. The agency has renamed their name "Cyber Crime Investigation Division" on 10 July 2020.

== Organization ==
Headquartered in 36 Minto Road, Ramna, Dhaka, the division works under one deputy commissioner of police. He is assisted by two additional deputy commissioners of police. They supervise four teams, namely:

1. Internet Referral;
2. Cyber Terrorism Investigation;
3. Digital Forensic and
4. E-fraud Investigation.

Each of these teams are led by one assistant commissioner of police. The total strength sanctioned for this division is 100.

== Services ==
The Cyber Division services by its help desk, over hotline number, e-mail, Hello CT apps and different social media platforms.

The Cyber Division's help desk assists victims of cyber crime in the Dhaka Metropolitan area.

== Awards ==
In 2017 one of the ADC Md Najmul Islam was awarded a service medal.

On 12 December 2018 this division was awarded with Digital Bangladesh Award 2018.

== Cyber crime investigating agencies in Bangladesh ==
Besides this division Cyber Police Center, CID; Cyber Branch, Police Bureau of Investigation and Cyber & Special Crime Division, DB, DMP are responsible to investigate cyber crime in Bangladesh.
