= Pixie Hollow (video game) =

2008 video game

- Developers: Disney Interactive Studios, Schell Games, SilverTree Media
- Publisher: Disney Interactive Studios
- Platforms: Microsoft Windows, Mac OS X
- Release: NA: September 20, 2008
- Genre: Massive multiplayer online role-playing
- Mode: Multiplayer

Pixie Hollow was a massively multiplayer online role-playing game (MMORPG) addition to the Disney Fairies franchise that ran from 2008 to 2013. It was produced by DisneyToon Studios and developed by Schell Games. The game was released to coincide with the 2008 film, Tinker Bell and revolved around Tinker Bell, a fairy character created by J. M. Barrie in his play Peter Pan and incorporating her fairy friends from the Disney Fairies animated works by the Walt Disney Company.

== Gameplay ==
The first steps of the game were creating an avatar through various character customization options, starting with choosing between a fairy and a sparrow man. The next step was choosing the type of fairy: animal, water, tinker, garden, or light. Next, you chose your character's size, face, hair, and wings. Players could fully customize their fairy by choosing the top, bottoms, sash, barrette, necklace, bracelet, anklet, and shoes. The players' fairy names and online names were selected using a randomizer, with names provided by the website.

After creating an avatar, the player could explore the land of Pixie Hollow and occasionally interact with characters from the Disney Fairies franchise and other players through various chat modes. There were many points of interest called Meadows. These meadows included Havendish Square and Fairy Coliseum. Spring Meadows included Cherryblossom Heights, Neverberry Thicket, Springtime Orchard, Treetop Bend, and Dewdrop Vale. Summer Meadows were Sunflower Gully, Neverfruit Grove, and Palm Tree Cove. Autumn Meadows consisted of Acorn Summit, Maple Tree Hill, Cottonpuff Field, and Pumpkin Patch. Winter Meadows were Snowcap Glade, Evergreen Overlook, and Chilly Falls. There were also Special Event Meadows called Mermaid Grotto, Frosted Forest, and Ice Palace.

The game included these Disney Fairies characters throughout various kinds of game play. The game included many different mini-games including Animal Derby, Butterfly Painter, Bubble Bounce, Crazy Cakes, Gem Juggle, Harvest Hustle, Fairy Fireworks, Firefly Light-Up, First Flight, Petal Pick-Up, Pinecone Pop, Seed Sorter, Snowflake Sweep, Snowy Lullaby, Sunbeam Bend, Tinker Toss, Two for Tea, Vidia's Daily Spin, and Water Web.

While exploring the world of Pixie Hollow, players were able to play talent games in order to gain various currencies, which could be traded and could be used at Fairy stores to buy clothing or furnishings for the Fairies' home. These shops varied in the items they offered. The cosmetic stores in the game were Gale's Outfitters, Summit Style, Pixie Post Office (which allowed players to buy outfits to send to other players), Coal's Clothiers, Cassie's Costume Shop, Zephyr's Zoom Room, Queen's Boutique, Schelly's Shears, Bella's Baubles, Daisy's Dyes, and Prism's Pixie Spa. Item shops for furniture and decor included Harmony's Sweet Shop, Phoebe's Party Favors, Garden Supply, Neville's New Homes, Ember's Essentials, and Treetop Housewares.

Players with paid membership could own pets known as "Animal Friends" and care for them. These animals could be purchased at Beck's Animal Nursery. Techno Source released a friendship bracelet in stores called Disney Fairies Pixie Hollow Clickables Friendship Bracelets, which was linked to users' online accounts. Overall, this game provided children and fans of the Disney Fairies franchise a chance to escape into the world of Pixie Hollow.

== Critical reception ==
GameZone gave the game 6/10. The game received the Parents' Choice Award, Silver Honor. The game also received the Parents' Choice Approved award.

In an article by Wired, the game received praise for the "Gorgeous graphics, heavy character customization, fun mini-games," but criticized the "Heavy handed consumerism."

A 2008 article from the magazine Variety about the site voiced concerns from parents that introducing children to online games at a young age could "one day make them a World of Warcraft addict". A New York Times article from 2007 said much of the same in its discussion about young children on the Internet. The article commented that the site could allow users to play games ("help create the seasons") and interact with other "fairies". When avatars move across the screen, they leave a sparkling trail of pixie dust, a carefully designed part of the experience.

== Closing ==
Pixie Hollow closed on September 19, 2013. Its closure was poorly received by users, especially bloggers in the community, many of whom created petitions to "save Pixie Hollow".

Following the game's closure, in 2018 a developer began the process of creating a spin-off of Pixie Hollow. This site has been up and running called We the Pixies. The game includes two of the original mini-games and three of the original map locations. The rebuild has a growing community on Discord, where players can find each other and talk with game developers about any needed fixes or bugs within the game.
