= Toontown Online =

2003 Disney video game

- Developer: Disney's Virtual Reality Studio; Schell Games; Frogchildren Studios
- Type: Massively multiplayer online role-playing game
- Launched: 2001 – January 16, 2002 (Beta 1); September 10, 2002 – October 21, 2002 (Beta 2) October 21, 2002 – June 2, 2003 (sneak preview); June 2, 2003 (official launch); November 28, 2006 (Mac OS X)
- Discontinued: September 19, 2013
- Platforms: Macintosh operating systems and Microsoft Windows
- Status: Defunct
- Website: toontown.go.com (archived on August 24, 2013)

Toontown Online, commonly known as Toontown, was a 2003 massively multiplayer online role-playing game based on a cartoon animal world, developed by Disney's Virtual Reality Studio and Schell Games, and published by The Walt Disney Company.

Players played as anthropomorphized animals, known as Toons, to explore a cartoon world, complete quests ("ToonTasks"), and engage in combat against the Cogs, robot businessmen who served as the game's antagonists. Players used weapons known as "Gags" — typically slapstick comedy items, such as a thrown cream pie — in combat.

Various servers hosting Toontown Online were shut down throughout the game's tenure; the primary U.S. servers and the game itself were ultimately closed in September 2013. Various fan servers have since been created using most of the game's original assets; the most popular of these, Toontown Rewritten, was created less than a week after Toontown Online's closure.

== Gameplay ==
=== Toons ===
Players' characters were called "Toons", which were anthropomorphized animals in the style of Disney cartoons. Players were able to customize their Toons in various shapes, colors, clothes, and sizes, as well as their species, with choices consisting of cats, dogs, ducks, mice, pigs, rabbits, bears, horses, and monkeys.

=== Combat ===
Cogs were the antagonists in-game, and they were stylized to be corporate robots that wanted to take over the town to propagate business culture. Cogs came in four types: brown-clad Bossbots, blue-clad Lawbots, green-clad Cashbots, and maroon-clad Sellbots, each with increasing levels throughout the game that increased their health and damage.

Toons began with basic 'Gags' and a 15-point 'Laff' meter and had a maximum of 137 point Laff meter at the end of the game. Gags, rooted in old cartoon slapstick humor, were weapons used to destroy the Cogs in Cog battles. Each 'Gag track' had Gags with different properties that could be unlocked by completing 'ToonTasks' and each gag track would get progressively more powerful as Toons used their gags more. The Laff meter functioned as a health meter, representing how much damage Toons could take from the Cogs before going 'sad' – in-game defeat. Cogs were battled using a timed turn-based combat system with up to four Toons in a battle. Cogs could be fought on the streets of the game, in 'Cog Buildings' or in their own designated 'Cog HQ', with each Cog HQ having a boss that could only be fought by obtaining a full set of the HQ's Cog disguise. These include the Senior V.P. (Vice President, Sellbot HQ), C.F.O. (Chief Financial Officer, Cashbot HQ) C.J. (Chief Justice, Lawbot HQ), and C.E.O. (Chief Executive Officer, Bossbot HQ).

A Toon in Toontown Central, the first playground available in-game.

=== Non-combat activities ===
Playgrounds were the only areas of Toontown permanently safe from Cogs. In the playgrounds, Toons could regain lost Laff Points, receive or complete ToonTasks unique to each playground, purchase gags, play trolley games, go fishing, kart racing, or golfing. By completing ToonTasks, Toons would grow in strength through additional Laff Points or new Gags. Laff Point increases were also available through fishing, racing, and golfing challenges. There was a playground in each neighborhood of Toontown. Each playground featured one of Disney's classic animated characters as a non-player character. The main playgrounds were Toontown Central, Daisy Gardens, Donald's Dock, Minnie's Melodyland, The Brrrgh, and Donald's Dreamland, along with extra playgrounds such as Goofy Speedway and Chip 'n Dale's Acorn Acres.

Every Toontown Online account came with a player's estate. Each estate consisted of a fishing pond and six houses for each Toon on the player's account. Players could customize their Toon's appearance and home with objects ordered from the in-game catalog ('Clarabelle's Cattlelog') by using jellybeans, the in-game currency. Wardrobes and accessory trunks held clothing and accessories that were not currently being worn by the player's Toon. Other elements of estates included Doodles (pets), gardening, fishing, and the ability to purchase various types of in-game items from Clarabelle's Cattlelog.

=== Online safety features ===
Toontown Online was marketed and developed for players of all ages, which is why a chat restriction was placed on the game. Players could initially only chat using "SpeedChat", a list of pre-approved phrases set by Disney that the player could select. It included general English phrases, in-game strategy phrases, and, occasionally, seasonal phrases. Players could purchase more SpeedChat phrases using, most of the time, 100 jellybeans. "SpeedChat Plus" and "Secret Friends", later renamed to "True Friends", were introduced sometime after the game's release, which had to be enabled using a parental account if the player was under 13 years of age. SpeedChat Plus allowed the player to type their messages against a word filter developed by Disney; if a word was not allowed, it was replaced with an onomatopoeia of that player's Toon's species. True Friends allowed players to chat with a less restrictive filter with certain friends who have shared a "True Friend code" with each other.

=== Parties ===
Parties were hostable, plannable, and customizable events by Toons. Toons would use their stored jellybeans in their bank to customize and add content to their parties, such as fireworks, minigames (Tug-O-War, etc.), trampolines, party cannons, etc. To plan a party, Toons would go to a Toon Party Planner. Toons could also customize their invitations to these parties.

== Distribution ==
=== CD-ROM ===
Platform Publishing, a subsidiary company of Sony Online Entertainment that publishes games for third-party developers, acquired rights to publish a CD version of Toontown Online in August 2005 for the PC and their intention to bring the game to online game consoles. Toontown Online became available on CD for the PC on October 3 of the same year. This allowed players to play the game without downloading it onto their storage devices. This version came in a box set with two months of subscription, a poster, a game manual, and an in-game bonus. Toontown Online chose to create a CD that could be purchased in stores, due to customer insecurity when downloading and buying things online that they could not physically hold.

== Closure ==
After ten years of operation, Toontown Online was shut down permanently on September 19, 2013. After the announcement, every player was given membership for the remaining time of the game. Seasonal and holiday celebrations and special in-game events took place in the time remaining. Recurring paid memberships were automatically canceled. Memberships could no longer be purchased, and accounts could no longer be created after the fact. The website was also updated with a closing FAQ.

After the game's closure, Toontown's website was updated with a new FAQ to help with billing support and inform users about the game's closure. Toontown's site, toontown.go.com, now redirects to Disney's main site, disney.com. In response to the closure, former players have created multiple private servers of Toontown Online that are free-to-play and not monetized. The most popular server, Toontown Rewritten, is described by its developers as a fan-made revival of Disney's Toontown Online, created using publicly available downloads and information made freely available to the general public in September 2014. The server has operated for over 10 years with the help of volunteer staff members. Its creator, Joey Ziolkowski, currently works with Jesse Schell, the former Creative Director of the Walt Disney Imagineering Virtual Reality Studio, at his company, Schell Games. Schell has hinted that Toontown Online closed due to becoming unsustainable in its business model (subscription-based downloadable RPG). Schell confirmed that Disney wanted to port the game to mobile devices but was waiting for a working business model for self-sustaining, constantly-updating mobile RPGs. Schell also stated that the company has hosted internal meetings discussing the future of the game, taking the popularity of mobile games, and the payment options available on that platform into consideration for planning the next step for the Toontown license. A solution has yet to be agreed upon, but according to Schell these internal meetings continued into 2016.

In June 2021, seven years after the game's closure, an unofficial archive of Toontown Online materials titled the "Toontown Preservation Project" was released by Toontown Rewritten. The archive, hosted on Toontown Rewritten's Notion board, showcases original design documents and artwork donated by the game's developers, along with promotional materials including digital downloads, merchandise, newsletters, trading cards, and websites.

== ToonFest ==
Disney organized two real-life gatherings for Toontown fans called ToonFest. These included themed activities and games, trivia and costume contests, previews of upcoming features for the game, and developer Q&A panels. The first gathering, ToonFest 2006, was held at the Walt Disney Studios complex in Burbank, California. The second gathering, ToonFest 2007, was held at Walt Disney World in Orlando, Florida.

The fan project Toontown Rewritten would later hold their own real-life gatherings, and named these fan convention events after ToonFest.

== Reception ==
Reception

Aggregate scores
Aggregator	Score
GameRankings	82%
Metacritic	81%

Review scores
Publication	Score
Computer Games Magazine	5/5
GameZone	9/10
Game industry News	4.5/5
GamerDad	4.5/5
PC Magazine	3/5

GameZone rated Toontown 9/10 overall, praising its art, chat features, combat design, multiplayer mini-games, and progression curves. They enjoyed the game despite it being designed for children and felt grateful to have an MMORPG on the market that they felt comfortable letting their kids play.

=== Awards and nominations ===
Year	Association	Award	Category	Result	Ref
2003	Academy of Interactive Arts & Sciences	Massive Multiplayer/Persistent World Game of the Year	Games	Nominated	
2003	Computer Gaming World	MMORPG Game of the Year	Online Games	Won	
2003	Game industry News	Family Game of the Year	Games	Won	
2003	Parents' Choice Foundation	Silver Honor	Online Video Games	Won	
2003	Web Marketing Association	WebAward Outstanding Website	Game Site	Won	
2003	The Webby Awards	Webby Award	Games	Nominated	
2003	The Webby Awards	Webby Award People's Voice	Youth	Won	
2004	Web Marketing Association	WebAward Outstanding Website	Game Site	Won	
2005	Web Marketing Association	WebAward Outstanding Website	Game Site	Won	
2005	The Webby Awards	Webby Award	Games	Nominated	
2005	The Webby Awards	"Webby Worthy Selection"	Games	Won	
2005	WiredKids	Safe Gaming Award	Computer Games	Won	
2006	Web Marketing Association	WebAward Game Site Standard of Excellence	Game Site	Won	
2006	The Webby Awards	Webby Award	Games	Nominated	
2007
2007	Web Marketing Association	WebAward Outstanding Website	Game Site	Won	
2009	Parent Tested Parent Approved	Seal of Approval	Website	Won	
