= List of PlayStation VR games =

This article lists current and upcoming games for the PlayStation VR headset.

There are 529 titles on this page.

== Games ==
A Aim controller optional	H HOTAS controller optional	M Move controller optional M required	Rift / Vive Cross-platform multiplayer	BD Blu-ray disc version

Title	Genre(s)	Developer(s)	Publisher(s)	Release date				Addons	Ref.
Title	Genre(s)	Developer(s)	Publisher(s)	North America	Europe	Japan	Asia non-Japan	Addons	Ref.
The 100 Wonders of Japan: Himeji Castle	Interactive movie	Kyodo Television	Kyodo Television	Unreleased	Unreleased	Sep 21, 2017	Unreleased		
18 Floors	Escape room, puzzle	Aoga Tech	Winking Skywalker	Jul 3, 2018	Jul 4, 2018	Jul 4, 2018	Jul 10, 2018	M	
1976		Ivanovich Games	Ivanovich Games	TBA	TBA	TBA	TBA		
100ft Robot Golf	Sports	No Goblin	No Goblin	Oct 10, 2016	Oct 10, 2016	Unreleased	Unreleased		
2MD: VR Football	Sports	Truant Pixel	Truant Pixel	May 8, 2018	May 8, 2018	Unreleased	Unreleased	M	
360 Date Osana Najimi	Interactive movie	Kyodo Television	Kyodo Television	Unreleased	Unreleased	Sep 21, 2017	Unreleased		
502nd JFW Brave Witches VR: Operation Baba-Yaga	Aerial combat	Production I.G.	Production I.G.	Unreleased	Unreleased	Apr 2, 2018	Unreleased		
A Chair in a Room: Greenwater	Horror	Wolf & Wood Interactive	Wolf & Wood Interactive	Apr 23, 2019	Unreleased	Unreleased	Unreleased	M	
A Night at the Forum		VRtron	VRtron	Unreleased	May 22, 2019	Unreleased	Unreleased	M	
A Room Where Art Conceals	Puzzle	Shanghai Oriental Pearl Culture Development	Shanghai Oriental Pearl Culture Development	Apr 8, 2020	Apr 7, 2020	Unreleased	May 5, 2018	M	
A-Train Express	City development railroad simulation	Artdink	Artdink	Jun 7, 2019	Unreleased	Dec 21, 2017	Unreleased	BD	
A-Tech Cybernetic VR	Action, horror	Xreal Games	Xreal Games	Mar 27, 2020	Mar 26, 2020	Unreleased	Unreleased	M	
Accounting+	Exploration game	Squanch Games	Crows Crows Crows	Dec 19, 2017	Dec 19, 2017	Dec 19, 2017	Unreleased	M BD	
Ace Banana	Action	Oasis Games	Oasis Games	Oct 13, 2016	Oct 13, 2016	Unreleased	Oct 13, 2016	M	
Ace Combat 7	Combat flight sim	Project Aces	Bandai Namco Ent.	Jan 17, 2019	Jan 17, 2019	Jan 17, 2019	Jan 17, 2019	H BD	
A Fisherman’s Tale	Puzzle	Innerspace VR	Vertigo Games	Jan 22, 2019	Jan 22, 2019	Jul 4, 2019	Unreleased	M	
Affected: The Manor	Horror	Fallen Planet Studios	Fallen Planet Studios	Nov 27, 2018	Dec 14, 2018	Unreleased	Unreleased	M	
Afterlife	Horror	Signal Space	Signal Space	Aug 21, 2019	Unreleased	Unreleased	Unreleased	M	
Airtone	Rhythm	Historia	AMG Games	Unreleased	Unreleased	Nov 29, 2018	Unreleased	M	
Along Together	Puzzle, adventure	Turbo Button	Turbo Button	May 29, 2018	May 29, 2018	Unreleased	Unreleased		
Arca's Path VR	Casual	Rebellion	Rebellion	Dec 4, 2018	Dec 4, 2018	Unreleased	Unreleased		
The Arcslinger	Shooter	Big Red Button Entertainment	Big Red Button Entertainment	Feb 26, 2019	Feb 26, 2019	Unreleased	Unreleased	M	
The American Dream	FPS	Samurai Punk	Samurai Punk	Mar 14, 2018	Mar 14, 2018	Unreleased	Unreleased	BD	
Ancient Amuletor	Action, tower defense	TiGames	Time of Virtual Reality	Jun 27, 2017	Jun 27, 2017	Jul 13, 2017	Jul 13, 2017	M	
Angry Birds VR: Isle of Pigs		Resolution Games	Resolution Games	Mar 26, 2019	Apr 16, 2019	Unreleased	Unreleased	M	
The Angry Birds Movie 2 VR: Under Pressure	Party	XR Games	XR Games	Aug 6, 2019	Aug 6, 2019	Aug 23, 2019	Unreleased	BD	
Animal Force	Strategy	Sony Interactive Entertainment	Sony Interactive Entertainment	Jul 10, 2018	May 22, 2018	Jun 21, 2018	Jun 21, 2018	M	
Anyone's Diary	Puzzle	World Domination Project	Lanzadera	Jan 31, 2019	Jan 31, 2019	Unreleased	Unreleased	M	
The Apollo 11: VR Experience	Simulation	David Whelan	Immersive VR Education	Jul 25, 2017	Mar 1, 2017	Mar 5, 2018	Unreleased		
Apocalypse Rider	Arcade	VRMonkey	VRMonkey	Sep 4, 2018	Mar 11, 2020	Unreleased	Unreleased	M	
Apex Construct	Action-adventure	Fast Travel Games	Fast Travel Games	Feb 20, 2018	Feb 20, 2018	Unreleased	Unreleased	M BD	
Arashi: Castles of Sin	Action	Endeavor One	Perp Games	March 9, 2021	TBA	TBA	TBA		
Archangel	Shooter	Skydance Interactive	Skydance Interactive	Jul 18, 2017	Aug 22, 2017	Oct 4, 2018	Unreleased	M	
Arizona Sunshine	First-person shooter, survival	Vertigo Games	Vertigo Games	Jun 27, 2017	Jul 5, 2017	Mar 22, 2018	Mar 22, 2018	A M BD	
Ark Park	Adventure, simulation	Snail Games	Studio Wildcard	Mar 22, 2018	Mar 22, 2018	Mar 22, 2018	Mar 22, 2018	M BD	
ArtPulse	Adventure	Mekiwi	Mekiwi	Dec 17, 2019	Dec 17, 2019	Unreleased	Unreleased	M	
The Assembly	Adventure	nDreams	nDreams	Oct 13, 2016	Oct 13, 2016	Oct 13, 2016	Nov 2, 2016	M BD	
Astro Bot Rescue Mission	Adventure, platform	Japan Studio (Team Asobi)	Sony Interactive Entertainment	Oct 2, 2018	Oct 3, 2018	Oct 4, 2018	Oct 4, 2018	BD	
ATV Drift & Tricks	Racing	Anuman Interactive	Anuman Interactive	Nov 14, 2017	Oct 26, 2017	Jan 18, 2018	Unreleased	BD	
Audica	Rhythm; music	Harmonix	Harmonix	Nov 5, 2019	Nov 5, 2019	Nov 5, 2019	Nov 5, 2019	M	
Audio Beats	Music	Famiku	Famiku	Mar 20, 2018	Mar 21, 2018	Unreleased	Dec 18, 2017	M	
Bartender VR Simulator	Simulation	VR Factory	VR Factory	May 16, 2019	May 20, 2019	Unreleased	Unreleased	M	
Baskhead Training	Sports	VR Lines	VR Lines	Unreleased	Oct 11, 2017	Unreleased	Unreleased	M	
Batman: Arkham VR	Action-adventure	Rocksteady Studios	Warner Bros Ent.	Oct 13, 2016	Oct 13, 2016	Oct 13, 2016	Oct 13, 2016	M BD	
Battlewake	Action, racing, shooter	Survios	Survios	Sep 10, 2019	Sep 19, 2019	Unreleased	Unreleased	M BD	
Battlezone	Vehicular combat	Rebellion Developments	Rebellion Developments	Oct 13, 2016	Oct 13, 2016	Oct 13, 2016	Oct 13, 2016	BD	
Beat Blaster		Ivanovich Games	Ivanovich Games	Apr 5, 2019	Apr 5, 2019	Unreleased	Unreleased	A M	
Beat Saber	Rhythm	Beat Games	Beat Games	Nov 20, 2018	Nov 20, 2018	Mar 7, 2019	Unreleased	M	
Beats Fever	Rhythm	Shanghai Chenyou Information Technology	Shanghai Chenyou Information Technology	Dec 18, 2018	May 17, 2019	Aug 19, 2019	Aug 29, 2018	M	
The Bellows	Horror	Castle Steps	Castle Steps	Jul 11, 2017	Unreleased	Nov 2, 2017	Unreleased	M	
Bikerider VR	Bike runner	Chariso	Chariso	Unreleased	Unreleased	Feb 21, 2017	Feb 21, 2017		
Black Hat Cooperative	Action	Team Future	Team Future	May 29, 2018	Unreleased	Unreleased	Unreleased	M	
Blind	Exploration, Narrative, Puzzle	Tiny Bull Studios	Fellow Traveler	Sep 18, 2018	Sep 18, 2018	Sep 18, 2018	Sep 18, 2018	M BD	
Blind Spot	Puzzle, adventure	Unlimited Fly	Unlimited Fly	Nov 6, 2019	Oct 29, 2019	Unreleased	Unreleased	M	
Blindfold A Vérité VR Experience	Horror	Ink Studios	Digerati	Sep 3, 2019	Sep 3, 2019	Sep 3, 2019	Sep 3, 2019		
Blasters of the Universe	Brawler	Secret Location	Secret Location	Feb 27, 2018	Feb 27, 2018	Unreleased	Unreleased	M	
Bloody Zombies	Brawler	nDreams	nDreams	Sep 12, 2017	Sep 12, 2017	Unreleased	Unreleased		
Blood & Truth	First-person shooter	London Studio	Sony Interactive Ent.	May 28, 2019	May 28, 2019	Jul 19, 2019	May 28, 2019	M BD	
Bonfire	Experience	Baobab Studios	Baobab Studios	Oct 22, 2019	Oct 24, 2019	Oct 23, 2019	Unreleased	M	
Borderlands 2 VR	First-Person	2K Games	2K Games	Dec 14, 2018	Dec 14, 2018	Dec 14, 2018	Dec 14, 2018	A M	
Bound	Action, platform	Plastic	Sony Interactive Ent.	Oct 13, 2016	Oct 13, 2016	Oct 13, 2016	Oct 13, 2016		
Bow to Blood	Aerial combat	Tribetoy	Tribetoy	Aug 28, 2018	Aug 28, 2018	Unreleased	Unreleased	M	
Boxing Apocalypse	Sports	Gotham City Films	Gotham City Films	Nov 20, 2018	Feb 8, 2018	Unreleased	Unreleased	M	
BoxVR	Sports	FitXR	FitXR	Apr 30, 2019	Apr 30, 2019	Aug 22, 2019	Unreleased	M BD	
Bravo Team	First-person shooter	Supermassive Games	Supermassive Games	Mar 6, 2018	Mar 7, 2018	Unreleased	Mar 7, 2018	A M BD	
The Brookhaven Experiment	Survival horror	Phosphor Games	Phosphor Games	Oct 13, 2016	Nov 9, 2016	Feb 23, 2017	Unreleased	A M	
Budget Cuts	Action; stealth	Neat Corporation	Neat Corporation	May 15, 2020	May 15, 2020	May 15, 2020	May 15, 2020	BD	
BugsBoxVR	Casual	Park ESM	Park ESM	Oct 24, 2018	Unreleased	Oct 18, 2018	Sep 18, 2018		
Catch & Release	Simulation	Metric Minds	Metric Minds	Aug 28, 2018	Aug 28, 2018	Apr 26, 2019	Unreleased	M	
Cave Digger: Riches		VRkiwi; Mekiwi	Mekiwi	Mar 25, 2019	Apr 18, 2019	Jun 16, 2020	Unreleased	M	
Cavernous Wastes	Simulation	PouncingKitten Games	PouncingKitten Games	Jun 27, 2017	Unreleased	Unreleased	Unreleased		
Carly and the Reaperman: Escape from the Underworld		Odd Raven Studios	Odd Raven Studios	Oct 2, 2019	Oct 2, 2019	Dec 2, 2019	Unreleased	M BD	
Carnival Games VR	Party	Cat Daddy Games	2K Play	Oct 28, 2016	Oct 28, 2016	Jan 12, 2017	Oct 28, 2016	M	
CastleStorm VR	Strategy	Zen Studios	Zen Studios	Aug 1, 2017	Aug 1, 2017	Unreleased	Unreleased		
Catan VR	Simulation	Experiment 7	Experiment 7	Jun 25, 2019	Jun 25, 2019	Unreleased	Unreleased	M	
Catlateral Damage	Simulation	Chris Chung	Fire Hose Games	Mar 22, 2016	Jun 13, 2016	Oct 13, 2016	Unreleased	M	
Chainman	Survival horror	ouka-ichi-mon	ouka-ichi-mon	Unreleased	Unreleased	Dec 15, 2017	Unreleased		
The Chantry	Educational	Steel Minions	Steel Minions	Unreleased	Sep 17, 2018	Unreleased	Unreleased	M	
Chernobyl VR Project	Adventure	The Farm 51	The Farm 51	Sep 29, 2017	Sep 29, 2017	Unreleased	Unreleased		
Chess Ultra	Sport, Chess	Ripstone Games	Ripstone Games	Jun 20, 2017	Jun 21, 2017	Unreleased	Unreleased		
ChromaGun VR	First-person, puzzle	Pixel Maniacs	Pixel Maniacs	Feb 19, 2019	Feb 19, 2019	Unreleased	Unreleased	A	
Coaster	Simulation	Monster Paw	Binarie	Unreleased	Feb 17, 2020	Unreleased	Unreleased	M	
Cocos: Shark Island	Interactive Experience	Alchemy VR	Alchemy VR	Unreleased	Apr 7, 2017	Unreleased	Dec 5, 2017	M	
Code51: Mecha Arena	Action, shooter	Smellyriver Entertainment Technology	Smellyriver Entertainment Technology	Apr 24, 2018	Aug 28, 2018	Unreleased	Aug 29, 2018		
Cold Iron	Puzzle, shooter	Catch & Release	Catch & Release	Jan 30, 2018	Feb 27, 2018	Unreleased	Unreleased	M	
Concrete Genie	Action	Worldwide Studios	Worldwide Studios	Oct 8, 2019	Oct 8, 2019	Oct 10, 2019	Oct 9, 2019	M BD	
Contagion VR: Outbreak		Monochrome	Monochrome	Nov 12, 2019	Dec 16, 2019	Unreleased	Unreleased	M	
CoolPaintrVR	Adventure	Wildbit Studios	Singular People	May 8, 2018	May 22, 2018	Unreleased	Unreleased	M BD	
The Copper Canyon Shoot Out	Arcade, shooter	Black Dragon Studios	Black Dragon Studios	Jul 19, 2019	Jun 14, 2019	Unreleased	Unreleased	M	
Counter Fight 3	Action	Tricol	Tricol	Jun 25, 2019	Jun 24, 2019	Jun 24, 2019	Unreleased	M	
Counter Fight: Samurai Edition	Action	Tricol	Tricol	Mar 29, 2019	Apr 25, 2019	Mar 5, 2019	Unreleased	M	
Counter Fight VR	Action	Tricol	Tricol	Mar 29, 2018	Apr 25, 2018	Dec 19, 2018	Unreleased	M	
Covert	Adventure	White Elk	White Elk	Mar 10, 2020	Unreleased	Unreleased	Unreleased	M	
Creed: Rise to Glory	Sports	Survios	Survios	Sep 25, 2018	Sep 25, 2018	Oct 11, 2019	Unreleased	M BD	
Crisis on the Planet of the Apes VR	Action	Advanced Visual Entertainment	20th Century Fox Film Corporation	Apr 3, 2018	Apr 3, 2018	Apr 26, 2019	Dec 20, 2018	M	
Crisis VRigade	Action, shooter	Sumalab	Sumalab	Feb 5, 2019	Feb 15, 2019	Nov 5, 2019	Unreleased	A M	
Croixleur Sigma	Hack 'n slash	Playism	Playism	Unreleased	Unreleased	Apr 29, 2017	Unreleased	BD	
Crystal Rift	Adventure	Psytec Games	Psytec Games	Nov 29, 2016	Nov 29, 2016	Jun 30, 2017	Unreleased		
Ctrl	Interactive Movie	Breaking Fourth	Breaking Fourth	Unreleased	Jun 23, 2017	Unreleased	Unreleased		
CubeWorks	Puzzle	TinMoon Studios	TinMoon Studios	Feb 13, 2018	Unreleased	Unreleased	Unreleased	M	
Cubians VR	Casual	IKina Games	IKina Games	Unreleased	Unreleased	Unreleased	May 2, 2018	M	
The Curious Tale of the Stolen Pets	Adventure	Fast Travel Games	Fast Travel Games	Nov 19, 2019	Nov 20, 2019	Unreleased	Unreleased	M BD	
Cyber Danganronpa VR: The Class Trial	Adventure	Spike Chunsoft	Spike Chunsoft	Mar 7, 2017	Mar 10, 2017	Oct 13, 2016	Unreleased		
Dancing Beauty: Idol Project	Shooter	Shanghai Oriental Pearl Culture Development	Shanghai Oriental Pearl Culture Development	Unreleased	Unreleased	Unreleased	Oct 5, 2018	M	
Dark Legion	Shooter	Ice World	Ice World	Unreleased	Jun 15, 2018	Unreleased	Mar 26, 2018	M	
Darknet	Puzzle	Archiact Int.	Archiact Int.	Mar 7, 2017	Mar 7, 2017	Mar 30, 2017	Unreleased		
Darkness Rollercoaster: Ultimate Shooter Edition	Rollercoaster	Creative VR3D	Creative VR3D	Feb 12, 2020	May 23, 2019	Unreleased	Unreleased	M	
David Attenborough's First Life VR	Interactive Experience	Alchemy VR	Alchemy VR	Unreleased	Apr 7, 2017	Unreleased	Dec 6, 2017		
David Attenborough's Great Barrier Reef Dive	Interactive Experience	Alchemy VR	Alchemy VR	Unreleased	Dec 3, 2018	Unreleased	Unreleased		
Dead Land VR	Action	Khizar Awan	Spur Arts	Feb 1, 2019	Feb 15, 2019	Unreleased	Unreleased		
Dead or Alive Xtreme 3	Sports, Dating Sim	Koei Tecmo	Koei Tecmo	Unreleased	Unreleased	Jan 24, 2017	Aug 3, 2017	BD	
Dead Secret	Horror	Robot Invader	Robot Invader	Apr 24, 2018	Apr 24, 2018	Unreleased	Unreleased		
Deemo: Reborn	Rhythm	Rayark	Unties	Nov 21, 2019	Nov 21, 2019	Nov 21, 2019	Nov 21, 2019	M BD	
Déraciné	First-person adventure	FromSoftware	Sony Interactive Entertainment	Nov 6, 2018	Nov 6, 2018	Nov 6, 2018	Nov 6, 2018	M BD	
Detached	First-person adventure	Anshar Studios	Anshar Studios	Jul 24, 2018	Jul 24, 2018	Unreleased	Unreleased		
Dexed	Action	Ninja Theory	Ninja Theory	Jan 31, 2017	Feb 1, 2017	Feb 22, 2017	Unreleased	M BD	
Digital Domain's Monkey King	Interactive Movie	Digital Domain Interactive	Digital Domain Interactive	Jul 25, 2017	Unreleased	Unreleased	Unreleased		
Dick Wilde	First-person	Bolverk Games	PlayStack	May 16, 2017	May 17, 2017	Nov 30, 2017	Unreleased	A M	
Dick Wilde 2	First-person	Bolverk Games	PlayStack	Feb 19, 2019	Feb 19, 2019	Unreleased	Unreleased	A M Rift Vive	
Dino Frontier	Simulation	Uber Ent.	Uber Ent.	Aug 1, 2017	Aug 1, 2017	Unreleased	Unreleased	M	
Dirt Rally	Racing	Codemasters	Codemasters	Feb 21, 2017	Feb 21, 2017	Feb 21, 2017	Mar 15, 2017	BD	
Disaster Report 4 Plus: Summer Memories	Survival action-adventure	Granzella	Granzella	Unreleased	Unreleased	Oct 25, 2018	Unreleased	BD	
Discovery	Adventure	Noowanda	Noowanda	Nov 7, 2017	Nov 22, 2017	Nov 16, 2017	Unreleased		
Doctor Who: The Edge of Time	Adventure, puzzle	PlayStack	PlayStack	Nov 12, 2019	Nov 12, 2019	Unreleased	Unreleased	M BD	
Domino Craft VR	Casual	Shanghai Lusion Computer Software	Shanghai Lusion Computer Software	Aug 14, 2018	Aug 28, 2018	Unreleased	Aug 24, 2018	M	
Don't Knock Twice	Horror	Wales Interactive	Wales Interactive	Sep 5, 2017	Sep 5, 2017	Dec 27, 2018	Dec 27, 2018	M BD	
Doom VFR	First-person shooter	Bethesda	Bethesda	Dec 1, 2017	Dec 1, 2017	Dec 21, 2017	Dec 1, 2017	A M	
DOOM 3 VR Edition	First-person shooter	Bethesda	Bethesda	Mar 29, 2019	Mar 29, 2017			A M	
The Door	Horror	Skonec Entertainment	Skonec Entertainment	Sep 21, 2018	Nov 26, 2018	Nov 30, 2018	Sep 28, 2018		
Down The Rabbit Hole	Adventure	Cortopia	Cortopia	May 1, 2020	May 1, 2020	Unreleased	Unreleased	BD	
Downward Spiral: Horus Station	Action, adventure	3rd Eye Studios	3rd Eye Studios	Sep 18, 2018	Sep 18, 2018	Oct 24, 2018	Dec 20, 2018	M	
Dreamworks Voltron VR Chronicles	Action, Puzzle, Adventure	Digital Domain Interactive	Digital Domain Interactive	Sep 26, 2017	Oct 3, 2017	Unreleased	Unreleased		
Dream Angling	Fishing	Bluck	Bluck	Apr 27, 2018	Unreleased	Unreleased	Jul 25, 2017	M	
Dream Match Tennis VR	Sports	Bimboosoft	Bimboosoft	Jul 10, 2018	Jul 10, 2018	Unreleased	Unreleased	M	
Dream Match Tennis VR World tour	Sports	Bimboosoft	Bimboosoft	Jan 23, 2019	Jan 22, 2019	Unreleased	Unreleased	M	
Driveclub VR	Racing	Evolution Studios	Sony Interactive Entertainment	Oct 13, 2016	Oct 13, 2016	Oct 13, 2016	Oct 13, 2016		
Drone Striker	Shooter	Winking Skywalker	Winking Skywalker	Oct 16, 2018	Oct 17, 2018	Oct 18, 2018	Oct 30, 2018	A M	
Drunkn Bar Fight	Action	The Munky	The Munky	Feb 13, 2018	Mar 6, 2018	Unreleased	Unreleased	M BD	
DWVR	Action, Arcade, First Person Shooter	Mad Triangles	Mad Triangles	Sep 26, 2017	Nov 23, 2017	Unreleased	Unreleased	A M	
Dying: Reborn	Horror, puzzle	Oasis Games	Oasis Games	Feb 28, 2017	Feb 28, 2017	May 25, 2017	Mar 16, 2017	BD	
Eagle Flight	Flight Combat	Ubisoft Montreal	Ubisoft	Nov 8, 2016	Nov 8, 2016	Nov 9, 2016	Nov 9, 2016	Rift Vive BD	
Eden Tomorrow	Action-adventure	Soulpix	Soulpix	Feb 12, 2019	Feb 12, 2019	Unreleased	Unreleased		
Electronauts	Music	Survios	Survios	Aug 7, 2018	Aug 7, 2018	Oct 11, 2019	Unreleased	M	
Eleven Eleven	Action	Digital Domain Interactive	Digital Domain Interactive	May 23, 2019	May 23, 2019	Unreleased	Unreleased	M	
End Space	Simulation, Space, Combat	Orange Bridge Studios	Orange Bridge Studios	Sep 19, 2017	Nov 7, 2017	Unreleased	Unreleased	H	
The Elder Scrolls V: Skyrim	Action, RPG	Bethesda Game Studios	Bethesda Softworks	Nov 17, 2017	Nov 17, 2017	Dec 14, 2017	Nov 24, 2017	M BD	
Espire 1: VR Operative	Shooter, adventure	Digital Lode	Tripwire Interactive	Nov 19, 2019	Unreleased	Unreleased	Unreleased	M	
Esper	Action, RPG	Coatsink Software	Coatsink Software	Jun 29, 2018	Jun 29, 2018	Unreleased	Unreleased	M	
Evasion	Shooter	Archiact Interactive	Archiact Interactive	Oct 9, 2017	Oct 9, 2017	Unreleased	Unreleased	A	
Everest VR	Simulation	Sólfar Studios	Sólfar Studios	Oct 3, 2017	Oct 4, 2017	Unreleased	Unreleased	M	
Everybody's Golf VR	Sports	Japan Studio	Sony Interactive Entertainment	May 21, 2019	May 21, 2019	May 21, 2019	May 21, 2019	M BD	
The Exorcist: Legion VR	Horror	LegionVR	LegionVR	Jun 19, 2018	Jun 19, 2018	Nov 2, 2018	Unreleased	M	
Eve: Gunjack	Space Shooter	CCP Games	CCP Games	Oct 13, 2016	Oct 13, 2016	Oct 13, 2016	Oct 13, 2016		
Eve: Valkyrie	Space Shooter	CCP Games	CCP Games	Oct 13, 2016	Oct 13, 2016	Oct 13, 2016	Unreleased	H Rift Vive BD	
Falcon Age	Action, adventure	Outerloop Games	Outerloop Games	Apr 9, 2019	Apr 9, 2019	Apr 9, 2019	Apr 9, 2019	M	
Fantastic Contraption	Puzzle	Northway Games	Radial Games	Jul 11, 2017	Jul 11, 2017	Jul 13, 2017	Unreleased		
Farpoint	FPS	Impulse Gear	Sony Interactive Entertainment	May 16, 2017	May 17, 2017	Jun 22, 2017	May 16, 2017	A BD	
Fat City VR	Puzzle	Heavy Iron Studios	Heavy Iron Studios	Dec 15, 2016	Unreleased	Unreleased	Unreleased		
Fated: The Silent Oath	Action-Adventure	Frima Studio	Frima Studio	Mar 28, 2017	Mar 28, 2017	Sep 6, 2018	Sep 6, 2018	BD	
Fear of Bugs: The Fear Experience		Good Vision	Good Vision	Feb 7, 2019	Unreleased	Unreleased	Unreleased		
Final Assault	Strategy	Phaser Lock	Phaser Lock	Mar 31, 2020	Unreleased	Nov 4, 2020	Unreleased	M Rift Vive	
Firewall: Zero Hour	Tactical first-person shooter	First Contact Ent.	Sony Interactive Ent.	Aug 29, 2018	Aug 29, 2018	Aug 30, 2018	Aug 28, 2018	A BD	
Fishing Master	Sports	Snowball Games	Snowball Games	Oct 24, 2017	Unreleased	Unreleased	Nov 28, 2017	M	
Fishing Planet: Happy 4-th of July Pack	Sports	Fishing Planet	Fishing Planet	Unreleased	Jun 27, 2018	Unreleased	Unreleased		
Five Nights at Freddy's: Help Wanted	Survival horror	Steel Wool	Steel Wool	May 28, 2019	May 28, 2019	Dec 20, 2019	May 28, 2019	M BD	
Flipy's Tesla! Let's invent the future! Episode 1	Simulation	Mediaproduccion	Mediaproduccion	Jan 11, 2018	Unreleased	Unreleased	Unreleased	M	
Floor Plan	Puzzle	Turbo Button	Turbo Button	Mar 20, 2018	Unreleased	Unreleased	Unreleased	M	
Fly to Kuma	Simulation	COLOPL	COLOPL	Unreleased	Unreleased	Oct 13, 2016	Unreleased		
Focus on You		Smilegate Entertainment	Smilegate Entertainment	Jul 16, 2019	Jul 5, 2019	Jul 5, 2019	Jul 5, 2019		
Football Nation VR Tournament 2018	Sports	Cherry Pop Games	Cherry Pop Games	Unreleased	Jun 7, 2018	Jun 7, 2018	Unreleased	M	
Form	Puzzle	Charm Games	Charm Games	Apr 7, 2020	Apr 7, 2020	Unreleased	Unreleased	M	
Freediver: Triton Down	Action, adventure	Archiact Interactive	Archiact Interactive	Feb 20, 2020	Mar 3, 2020	Unreleased	Unreleased	M	
Fruit Ninja VR	Action, Arcade	Halfbrick Studios	Halfbrick Studios	Dec 20, 2016	Dec 20, 2016	Mar 31, 2017	Unreleased	M BD	
Fujii	Adventure	Funktronic Labs	Funktronic Labs	Feb 4, 2020	Dec 10, 2019	Unreleased	Unreleased	M	
Ghost Giant	Adventure, puzzle	Zoink Games	Zoink Games	Apr 16, 2019	Apr 16, 2019	Unreleased	Unreleased	M BD	
Ghostbusters is Hiring: Firehouse	Action	Sony Pictures Virtual Reality	Sony Pictures	Mar 21, 2017	May 2, 2018	Unreleased	Unreleased	M	
Ghostbusters is Hiring: Showdown	Action	Sony Pictures Virtual Reality	Sony Pictures	Jan 9, 2018	May 2, 2018	Unreleased	Unreleased	M	
Ghosts In The Toybox: Chapter 1	Shooter	View Point Games	View Point Games	Nov 6, 2017	Unreleased	Unreleased	Unreleased	M	
GNOG	Puzzle	KO_OP	Double Fine Presents	May 2, 2017	May 2, 2017	May 2, 2017	Unreleased		
Golem	Adventure	Highwire Games	Highwire Games	Nov 15, 2019	Nov 18, 2019	Unreleased	Unreleased	M BD	
Good Goliath	Action	Knocktwice	Knocktwice	Mar 31, 2020	Unreleased	Unreleased	Unreleased	M	
Gorn	Action	Free Lives	Devolver Digital	May 19, 2020	May 19, 2020	May 19, 2020	May 19, 2020		
Gran Turismo Sport	Racing	Polyphony Digital	Sony Interactive Ent.	Oct 17, 2017	Oct 18, 2017	Oct 19, 2017	Oct 17, 2017	BD	
The Grand Museum VR	Educational, Casual	Owlgorithm	Owlgorithm	Sep 25, 2018	Sep 25, 2018	Unreleased	Unreleased	BD	
Groundhog Day: Like Father Like Son	Adventure	Tequila Works	Sony Pictures Virtual Reality	Sep 17, 2018	Sep 17, 2018	Dec 19, 2019	Unreleased	M	
Gun Club VR	Arcade, shooter	The Binary Mill	The Binary Mill	Dec 18, 2018	Dec 18, 2018	Apr 3, 2019	Unreleased	M BD	
Gungrave VR	Action	Iggymob	Xseed Games	Dec 11, 2018	Dec 7, 2018	Dec 14, 2017	Feb 22, 2018	BD	
Gungrave VR U.N.	Action	Iggymob	Iggymob	Dec 11, 2018	Dec 7, 2018	Aug 23, 2018	Unreleased		
Guns'n'Stories: Bulletproof VR	Action, shooter	MiroWin	MiroWin	Dec 7, 2018	Dec 11, 2018	Oct 18, 2019	Unreleased	M	
Happy Drummer	Music	Lusionsoft	Lusionsoft	Feb 6, 2018	Mar 19, 2018	Apr 4, 2018	Dec 21, 2017	M	
Happy Manager	Simulation	Tamsoft	D3 Publisher	Unreleased	Unreleased	Jan 11, 2018	Unreleased	BD	
Harmonix Music VR	Music, rhythm	Harmonix	Harmonix	Oct 13, 2016	Oct 13, 2016	Unreleased	Oct 13, 2016	M	
Hatsune Miku: Project DIVA X	Rhythm	Sega	Sega	Aug 30, 2016	Aug 30, 2016	Aug 25, 2016	Aug 25, 2016	M BD	
Hatsune Miku VR	Rhythm	Degica	Crypton Future Media	Dec 6, 2019	Dec 5, 2019	Dec 5, 2019	Unreleased	M	
Headbutt Factory	Action, puzzle	Gemdrops	Gemdrops	Unreleased	Unreleased	Feb 17, 2017	Mar 1, 2017		
Headmaster	Action, sports	Frame Interactive	Frame Interactive	Oct 13, 2016	Oct 13, 2016	Unreleased	Jun 6, 2018	BD	
Heavy Fire: Red Shadow	Action, arcade	Mastiff	Mastiff	Oct 16, 2018	Jun 23, 2019	Unreleased	Unreleased	BD	
Heroes of The Seven Seas	First-person	Mirage	Time of Virtual Reality	Jul 25, 2017	Unreleased	Unreleased	Unreleased		
Here They Lie	Horror	Tangentlemen	Sony Interactive Ent.	Oct 13, 2016	Oct 13, 2016	Oct 13, 2016	Oct 13, 2016	BD	
HeroCade	Interactive experience	Lucid Sight	Lucid Sight	Apr 18, 2017	Sep 26, 2017	Unreleased	Unreleased	M BD	
Hex Tunnel	Indie	Owlgorithm	Owlgorithm	Feb 27, 2018	Mar 6, 2018	Unreleased	Unreleased		
Hitman III	Stealth	IO Interactive	IO Interactive	Jan 20, 2021	Jan 20, 2021	Jan 20, 2021	Jan 20, 2021		
HoloBall	Sports, Arcade	TreeFortress Games	TreeFortress Games	Nov 22, 2016	Nov 29, 2016	Mar 2, 2017	Unreleased	M	
Home Sweet Home	First-person, horror	Yggdrazil Group	Mastiff	Oct 16, 2018	May 31, 2019	Jun 27, 2019	Unreleased	BD	
Homestar VR		Pocket Ohira Tech	Pocket Ohira Tech	Jun 28, 2018	Jun 28, 2018	Dec 20, 2017	Unreleased		
Honor and Duty: Arcade Edition	Action	Strange Games Studios	Strange Games Studios	Mar 28, 2018	Mar 28, 2018	Unreleased	Unreleased	A	
Honor and Duty: D-Day	Action	Strange Games Studios	Strange Games Studios	Feb 26, 2019	Feb 26, 2019	Unreleased	Unreleased	A M BD	
Hopalong: The Badlands	Action, adventure	From the Future	From the Future	Jul 17, 2018	Unreleased	Unreleased	Unreleased	M	
Horror Sense		Koei Tecmo	Koei Tecmo	Unreleased	Unreleased	Jan 25, 2019	Unreleased		
How We Soar	Flight, Adventure	Penny Black Studios	Penny Black Studios	Nov 29, 2016	Nov 29, 2016	Mar 3, 2017	Unreleased		
Human Anatomy VR	Educational	Virtual Medicine	Virtual Medicine	Aug 27, 2019	Aug 29, 2019	Unreleased	Unreleased	M	
Humanity	Puzzle	tha ltd.	Enhance Games	May 16, 2023	May 16, 2023	May 16, 2023	May 16, 2023	M	
Hustle Kings VR	Sports	EPOS Game Studios	Sony Interactive Ent.	Oct 13, 2016	Oct 13, 2016	Unreleased	Unreleased	M BD	
Hyper Void: VR Levels	Space shooter	InFramez Technology	InFramez Technology	Nov 1, 2016	Oct 27, 2016	Unreleased	Unreleased		
The Idolmaster Cinderella Girls	Simulation	Bandai Namco Ent.	Bandai Namco Ent.	Jul 18, 2017	Jul 19, 2017	Oct 13, 2016	Apr 21, 2017		
I Expect You To Die	Action, puzzle	Schell Games	Schell Games	Dec 13, 2016	Apr 4, 2017	Unreleased	Unreleased	M	
I'm Hungry	Simulation, Fitness	WINKING ENTERTAINMENT CORPORATION	WINKING ENTERTAINMENT CORPORATION	Jul 3, 2019	Jul 3, 2019	Jul 4, 2019	Unreleased	M	
In Death	Shooter	SOLFAR STUDIOS EHF	SOLFAR STUDIOS EHF	Nov 27, 2018	Nov 27, 2018	Unreleased	Unreleased	M	
Infinite Minigolf	Sports	Zen Studios	Zen Studios	Jul 25, 2017	Jul 25, 2017	Aug 10, 2017	Unreleased	BD	
Immortal Legacy: The Jade Cipher	Action Shooter Horror	VIVA Games	SIEE	Mar 20, 2019	Apr 17, 2019	Apr 18, 2019	Unreleased	M	
The Inpatient	Survival horror	Supermassive Games	Sony Interactive Ent.	Jan 23, 2018	Jan 24, 2018	Unreleased	Jan 24, 2018	M BD	
Intruders: Hide and Seek	First-person stealth	Tessera Studios	Daedalic Entertainment	Feb 13, 2019	Feb 13, 2019	Unreleased	Unreleased	BD	
The Invisible Hours	First-person, mystery	Tequila Works	GameTrust	Oct 10, 2017	Oct 17, 2017	Unreleased	Unreleased	BD	
Island Time VR	Arcade	Flight School Studio	Project Flight School Inc	Apr 3, 2018	Apr 3, 2018	Apr 10, 2018	Unreleased	M	
Japan Studio VR Music Festival	Music	Aimvillage	Aimvillage	Unreleased	Unreleased	Sep 20, 2017	Sep 20, 2017		
Job Simulator	Simulation	Owlchemy Labs	Owlchemy Labs	Oct 13, 2016	Oct 13, 2016	Dec 15, 2016	Oct 13, 2016	M BD	
Jupiter & Mars	Adventure Action	Tigertron	Tantalus / Wicked Witch	Apr 22, 2019	Apr 22, 2019	Apr 23, 2019	Apr 22, 2019	BD	
Just In Time Incorporated	Action	Second Wind Interactive 2018	Second Wind Interactive 2018	Apr 24, 2018	Apr 24, 2018	Unreleased	Unreleased	M	
Justice League VR: The Complete Experience	Action	Warner Bros. Int.	Warner Bros. Int.	Dec 5, 2017	Dec 5, 2017	Dec 5, 2017	Dec 6, 2017	M	
Kai-ri-Sei Million Arthur VR	RPG	Square Enix	Square Enix	Unreleased	Unreleased	Sep 28, 2017	Unreleased	M	
Kaiji VR: Steel Beam Crossing of Despair	Simulation	Solid Sphere	Solid Sphere	Unreleased	Unreleased	Aug 8, 2017	Jan 11, 2018		
Keep Talking and Nobody Explodes	Puzzle	Steel Crate Games	Steel Crate Games	Oct 13, 2016	Oct 13, 2016	May 30, 2019	Oct 13, 2016		
Killing Floor: Incursion	First-person shooter	Tripwire Int.	Tripwire Int.	May 1, 2018	May 1, 2018	Unreleased	Unreleased	BD	
Kingdom of Blades	Action	Chesstar studios	Chesstar studios	Jan 17, 2019	Jan 16, 2019	Unreleased	Unreleased	M	
Kitten'd	Simulation	Star Vault AB	Star Vault AB	Unreleased	Nov 18, 2019	Nov 14, 2019	Unreleased	M	
Knockout League	Sports	Grab Games	Grab Games	Feb 13, 2018	Mar 8, 2018	Sep 26, 2018	Unreleased	M	
Kona VR	Adventure	Koch Media GmbH	Koch Media GmbH	Jun 19, 2018	Jun 19, 2018	Unreleased	Jun 20, 2018	M	
Konrad the Kitten	Simulation	FusionPlay	FusionPlay	Feb 23, 2018	Feb 23, 2018	Unreleased	Unreleased		
Korix	Real-Time strategy	StellarVR	StellarVR	Mar 28, 2017	Mar 28, 2017	Unreleased	Unreleased	M BD	
Kowloon's Gate VR	Adventure	Jetman	Jetman	Unreleased	Unreleased	Oct 26, 2017	Jul 19, 2018		
Last Labyrinth	Escape Room	Amata K.K.		Nov 13, 2019	Nov 13, 2019	Nov 13, 2019	Nov 13, 2019	M BD	
L.A. Noire: The VR Case Files	Action, adventure	Rockstar Games	Rockstar Games	Sep 24, 2019	Sep 24, 2019	Sep 25, 2019	Unreleased	M	
League of War: VR Arena	Action, arcade, RTS	MunkyFun Inc.	MunkyFun Inc.	Nov 7, 2017	Nov 7, 2017	Nov 7, 2017	Unreleased	M	
Leave the Nest	Action, party	Kaio Int.	Kaio Int.	Mar 14, 2017	Unreleased	Unreleased	Unreleased	M	
Lethal VR	Shooter	Three Fields Ent.	Team17	Dec 20, 2016	Dec 20, 2016	Unreleased	Unreleased	M	
Light Tracer	Adventure	Oasis games	Oasis games	Sep 26, 2017	Sep 27, 2017	Oct 19, 2017	Sep 28, 2017	M BD	
Loading Human	Adventure	Untold Games	Maximum Games	Oct 13, 2016	Oct 13, 2016	Unreleased	Unreleased	M BD	
The Lost Bear	2D, platform	Odd Bug Studio	Fabrik Games	Sep 5, 2017	Sep 7, 2017	Sep 5, 2017	Unreleased		
Luna	Puzzle	Funomena	Funomena	Jun 18, 2019	Jun 19, 2019	Aug 7, 2019	Unreleased	M	
Lunar Stone Origin of Blood	Shooter	Zenox Studio	GQJoy	Mar 21, 2018	Unreleased	Unreleased	Dec 12, 2017	M	
The Mage's Tale		InXile Entertainment	InXile Entertainment	Feb 5, 2019	Feb 5, 2019	Unreleased	Unreleased	M	
Manifest 99	Interactive experience	Flight School Studio	Project Flight School	Sep 12, 2017	Dec 19, 2017	Mar 12, 2018	Unreleased		
The Martian: VR Experience	Interactive experience	20th Century Fox	20th Century Fox	Nov 15, 2016	Nov 15, 2016	Aug 2, 2018	Dec 14, 2016	M	
Mars Alive	Simulation	Winking Skywalker	Winking Skywalker	Jun 18, 2019	Jun 19, 2019	Jun 20, 2019	Jun 20, 2019		
Marvel's Iron Man VR	Shooter	Camouflaj	Sony Interactive Entertainment	Jul 3, 2020	Jul 3, 2020	Jul 3, 2020	Jul 3, 2020	M BD	
Medusa And Her Lover	Action	MiCRO ViSiON	MiCRO ViSiON	Jun 25, 2019	Jun 26, 2019	Apr 5, 2019	Unreleased		
Megadimension Neptune VIIR	RPG	Compile Heart	Idea Factory	May 8, 2018	May 11, 2018	Aug 24, 2017	Aug 24, 2017	BD	
Megalith	Action, shooter	Disruptive Games	Disruptive Games	Jan 8, 2019	Jan 8, 2019	Unreleased	Unreleased	M	
Megaton Rainfall	Action-adventure	Alfonso del Cerro	Pentadimensional	Oct 17, 2017	Oct 17, 2017	Oct 17, 2017	Unreleased	M	
Mervils: A VR Adventure	Adventure	Vitruvius Technologies Inc.	Vitruvius Technologies Inc.	Feb 21, 2017	Feb 21, 2017	Unreleased	Unreleased		
Mind Labyrinth VR Dreams	Adventure	Oxygene s.r.l.	Oxygene s.r.l.	Oct 23, 2018	Feb 27, 2019	Unreleased	Unreleased	M BD	
Minecraft	Sandbox, Survival	Mojang	Mojang Studios	Nov 18, 2011	Nov 18, 2011	Nov 18, 2011	Nov 18, 2011		
Mini Motor Racing X	Racing	The Binary Mill	The Binary Mill	Dec 17, 2019	Dec 17, 2019	Dec 17, 2019	Dec 17, 2019	M BD	
Mini-Mech Mayhem		Futurlab	Futurlab	Jun 18, 2019	Jun 18, 2019	Unreleased	Unreleased	M	
MiniWood VR	Simulation, arcade	IT-Spengler	IT-Spengler	Unreleased	Feb 25, 2019	Unreleased	Unreleased		
Minotaur Arcade Volume 1	Arcade	Llamasoft	Llamasoft	Oct 21, 2019	Oct 10, 2019	Unreleased	Unreleased		
MLB Home Run Derby VR	Sports	MLB Advanced Media	MLB Advanced Media	Apr 26, 2018	Oct 19, 2018	Unreleased	Unreleased	M	
Monster of the Deep: Final Fantasy XV	Simulation	Square Enix	Square Enix	Nov 21, 2017	Nov 21, 2017	Nov 21, 2017	Nov 21, 2017	M BD	
Moonshot Galaxy	Sports, puzzle	Liftoff Labs	Big Fish Games	May 9, 2017	Unreleased	Unreleased	Unreleased	M	
Moss	Adventure, puzzle	Polyarc Games	Polyarc Games	Feb 26, 2018	Feb 27, 2018	Feb 27, 2018	Jun 13, 2018	BD	
Moss: Book II	Adventure, puzzle	Polyarc Games	Polyarc Games	Mar 31, 2022	Mar 31, 2022	Mar 31, 2022	Mar 31, 2022	BD	
Moto Racer 4	Racing	Artefacts Studio	Microids	Jan 24, 2017	Nov 3, 2016	Dec 1, 2017	Nov 4, 2016	BD	
Mortal Blitz VR	FPS	Skonec Ent.	Skonec Ent.	Apr 4, 2017	Apr 4, 2017	Apr 26, 2017	Apr 4, 2017	M	
NBA 2K: VR Experience	Interactive experience	2K Games	2K Games	Nov 22, 2016	Nov 22, 2016	Dec 20, 2016	Nov 22, 2016	M	
Nebulous	Action, puzzle	Namazu Studios	Namazu Studios	Aug 30, 2016	Unreleased	Unreleased	Unreleased		
Neko Atsume VR	Simulation	Hit Point	Hit Point	Unreleased	Unreleased	May 31, 2018	Unreleased		
Neptune Flux	Adventure	Zoxide Games	Zoxide Games	Aug 8, 2017	Unreleased	Unreleased	Unreleased		
Neverout	Puzzle	Gamedust Sp. z o.o.	Gamedust Sp. z o.o.	Oct 23, 2018	Oct 23, 2018	Unreleased	Unreleased	M	
No Heroes Allowed! VR	RTS	Sony Interactive Entertainment	Sony Interactive Entertainment	Oct 17, 2017	Oct 17, 2017	Oct 14, 2017	Oct 14, 2017		
No Man's Sky Beyond	Action, adventure, survival	Hello Games	Sony Interactive Entertainment	Aug 14, 2019	Aug 14, 2019	Aug 14, 2019	Aug 14, 2019	M BD	
No Way Out: A Dead Realm Tale	Horror	3BD Games	3BD Games	Sep 30, 2019	Unreleased	Oct 4, 2019	Unreleased		
O! My Genesis VR	Simulation	XPEC Ent. / Bad Bird	XPEC Ent. / Bad Bird	Nov 4, 2016	Nov 18, 2016	Nov 4, 2016	Oct 13, 2016	M	
Obduction	Adventure, puzzle	Cyan Worlds	Cyan Worlds	Aug 29, 2017	Aug 29, 2017	Jun 29, 2018	Dec 12, 2017		
One Piece: Grand Cruise	Interactive experience	Bandai Namco Entertainment	Bandai Namco Entertainment	May 22, 2018	May 22, 2018	May 24, 2018	May 24, 2018	M	
Operation Warcade	Shooter	Ivanovich Games	Ivanovich Games	Apr 11, 2018	Apr 11, 2018	Unreleased	Unreleased	A M BD	
Out of Ammo	Action	Zen Studios	RocketWerks	Jan 30, 2018	Jan 30, 2018	Unreleased	Unreleased	M	
Paper Beast	Adventure	Pixel Reef	Pixel Reef	Mar 24, 2020	Mar 24, 2020	Unreleased	Unreleased	M	
Paper Dolls	First-Person, horror	Winking Skywalker	Winking Skywalker	Oct 30, 2018	Oct 31, 2018	Unreleased	Nov 1, 2018	M BD	
Paranormal Activity: The Lost Soul	Horror	VRwerx	VRwerx	Aug 15, 2017	Aug 16, 2017	Unreleased	Unreleased	BD	
Passengers: Awakening	Interactive movie	Sony Pictures Virtual Reality	Sony Pictures Virtual Reality	May 9, 2017	Unreleased	Unreleased	Unreleased	M	
Penn & Teller VR: F U, U, U, & U	Party	Gearbox	Gearbox	Jul 9, 2019	Jul 9, 2019	Unreleased	Unreleased	M BD	
Perfect	Simulation	nDreams	nDreams	Dec 13, 2016	Dec 20, 2016	May 2, 2017	Apr 4, 2017	M BD	
The Perfect Sniper	Action, Shooter, Simulation	Sinn Studio	Sinn Studio	May 29, 2018	Aug 9, 2018	Unreleased	Unreleased	A M	
Persona 3: Dancing in Moonlight	Music, Rhythm	P-Studio	Atlus	Dec 4, 2018	Dec 4, 2018	May 24, 2018	Sep 20, 2018	BD	
Persona 5: Dancing in Starlight	Music, Rhythm	P-Studio	Atlus	Dec 4, 2018	Dec 4, 2018	May 24, 2018	Sep 20, 2018	BD	
The Persistence	Horror, stealth	Firesprite	Firesprite	Jul 24, 2018	Jul 24, 2018	Jan 23, 2019	Unreleased	BD	
Picture Party VR	Puzzle	Vanguard Games	Vanguard Games	Dec 5, 2018	Dec 13, 2018	Unreleased	Unreleased		
PieceFall	Puzzle	Steel Minions	Steel Minions	Jul 31, 2018	Jul 31, 2018	Unreleased	Unreleased	M	
Pierhead Arcade	Pinball	Mechabit	Mechabit	Jan 30, 2018	Jan 30, 2018	Jan 30, 2018	Unreleased	M	
Pinball FX2 VR	Pinball	Zen Studios	Zen Studios	Nov 29, 2016	Nov 30, 2016	Dec 12, 2017	Unreleased		
Pirate Flight	Arcade	Andreas von Lepel	Andreas von Lepel	May 1, 2018	May 1, 2018	May 1, 2018	Unreleased		
Pistol Whip	Rhythm; shooter	Cloudhead Games	Cloudhead Games	Jul 30, 2020	Jul 30, 2020	Unreleased	Unreleased		
Pixel Gear	Shooter	Oasis Games	Oasis Games	Oct 20, 2016	Oct 20, 2016	Unreleased	Oct 21, 2016	M BD	
PixelJunk VR™ Dead Hungry	Action	Q-Games	Q-Games	Oct 31, 2017	Oct 31, 2017	Oct 25, 2017	Oct 25, 2017	M	
Pixel Ripped 1989	Simulation, Arcade	Pixel Ripped	Pixel Ripped	Jul 31, 2018	Oct 16, 2018	Jun 13, 2019	Unreleased	BD	
PlayStation VR Worlds	Interactive Experience	London Studio	Sony Interactive Entertainment	Oct 10, 2016	Oct 13, 2016	Oct 13, 2016	Oct 13, 2016	M BD	
Polybius	Arcade	Llamasoft	Llamasoft	May 9, 2017	May 10, 2017	Unreleased	Unreleased		
Pop-Up Pilgrims	Arcade	Dakko Dakko	Dakko Dakko	Feb 13, 2018	Unreleased	Unreleased	Unreleased		
Powerful Pro Baseball 2018	Sports	Konami	Konami	Unreleased	Unreleased	Apr 26, 2018	Unreleased		
Preta: Vendetta Rising	Action	Illion	YJM Games	Mar 29, 2018	Mar 28, 2018	Unreleased	Aug 1, 2018		
Prey: Typhon Hunter	Action	Bethesda	Bethesda	Dec 11, 2018	Dec 11, 2018	Dec 11, 2018	Dec 11, 2018	M	
Prison Boss VR	Simulation	Trebuchet Studio	Trebuchet Studio	Dec 4, 2018	Dec 5, 2018	Jan 21, 2019	Dec 27, 2018	M BD	
Project Lux	Visual novel	Spicy Tails	Spicy Tails; Sekai Project	Jun 20, 2019	Unreleased	Jul 2, 2019	Unreleased	M BD	
Proton Pulse Plus	Arcade	Zero Transform	Zero Transform	Nov 22, 2016	Feb 15, 2017	Unreleased	Unreleased	M	
Psychonauts in the Rhombus of Ruin	Puzzle; platform	Double Fine Productions	Double Fine Productions	Feb 21, 2017	Feb 21, 2017	Unreleased	Unreleased	BD	
Pupil: Wandering	Puzzle	Shanghai Oriental Pearl Culture Development	Shanghai Oriental Pearl Culture Development	Unreleased	Unreleased	Unreleased	Jan 18, 2018	M	
Quar: Infernal Machines		Funbox Media	Funbox Media	Mar 15, 2019	Mar 15, 2019	Unreleased	Unreleased	M BD	
QuiVr	Shooter	The Munky	The Munky	Apr 16, 2019	May 20, 2019	Unreleased	Unreleased	M BD	
Quiz Night Tonight!	Trivia	Mardonpol	Mardonpol	May 2, 2017	Unreleased	Unreleased	Unreleased	M	
The Rabbit Hole	Adventure, puzzle	VRMonkey	VRMonkey	Dec 12, 2017	Mar 18, 2020	Unreleased	Unreleased	M BD	
Race the Sun	Action, Arcade	Flippfly	Flippfly	Apr 18, 2017	Apr 18, 2017	Apr 18, 2017	Apr 18, 2017	BD	
Racket Fury: Table Tennis	Sports	Cmoar Studio	Cmoar Studio	Oct 2, 2018	Oct 4, 2018	Unreleased	Unreleased	M	
Radial-G: Racing Revolved	Racing	Tammeka Games	Tammeka Games	Sep 12, 2017	Sep 12, 2017	Sep 12, 2017	Unreleased	BD	
Rage Room	Action	Lockem Reality	Lockem Reality	Feb 4, 2019	Unreleased	Unreleased	Unreleased	M	
Ranch Planet	Simulation	AOGA Tech	AOGA Tech	Unreleased	Jun 15, 2018	Unreleased	Mar 23, 2018	M	
Rangi	Adventure	Funsoft	Digigo	Mar 6, 2018	Mar 6, 2018	Unreleased	Unreleased	M	
Raw Data	First-person shooter	Survios	Survios	Oct 10, 2017	Oct 18, 2017	Oct 11, 2017	Unreleased	M BD	
Reborn: A Samurai Awakens	Fighting	Geronimo Interactive		Nov 6, 2019	Nov 6, 2019	Nov 7, 2019	Unreleased	M	
Red Matter	Puzzle	Vertical Robot	Vertical Robot	Dec 11, 2018	Dec 6, 2018	Unreleased	Unreleased	M BD	
Resident Evil 7: Biohazard	Survival horror	Capcom	Capcom	Jan 24, 2017	Jan 24, 2017	Jan 26, 2017	Jan 24, 2017	BD	
Restless Spirit	Interactive movie	Wise	Wise	Unreleased	Unreleased	Apr 17, 2017	Unreleased		
Rez Infinite	Rail shooter, music	Monstars	Enhance Games	Oct 13, 2016	Oct 13, 2016	Oct 13, 2016	Oct 13, 2016	M BD	
Richie's Plank Experience	Adventure	Toast VR	Toast VR	Dec 12, 2018	Dec 12, 2018	Sep 13, 2019	Dec 2, 2019	M	
Rick and Morty: Virtual Rick-ality	Adventure	Owlchemy Labs	Adult Swim Games	Apr 24, 2018	Apr 24, 2018	Unreleased	Unreleased	M BD	
RIGS: Mechanized Combat League	Sports Shooter	Guerrilla Cambridge	Sony Interactive Ent.	Oct 13, 2016	Oct 13, 2016	Oct 13, 2016	Oct 13, 2016	BD	
Rise of Insanity	Horror	Red Limb Studio	Red Limb Studio	Jul 12, 2019	Jul 12, 2019	Unreleased	Unreleased		
Rise of the Tomb Raider: Blood Ties	Action-Adventure	Crystal Dynamics	Square Enix	Oct 11, 2016	Oct 11, 2016	Oct 11, 2016	Oct 11, 2016	BD	
Robinson: The Journey	Action-Adventure	Crytek	Crytek	Nov 8, 2016	Nov 9, 2016	Nov 30, 2016	Unreleased	BD	
Rollercoaster Dreams	Simulation	Bimboosoft	Bimboosoft	Dec 20, 2016	Dec 20, 2016	Mar 16, 2017	May 11, 2017		
RollerCoaster Legends	Simulation	Warducks	Warducks	Dec 21, 2017	Dec 21, 2017	Feb 9, 2018	Unreleased		
RollerCoaster Legends II: Thor's Hammer	Simulation	Warducks	Warducks	Jan 5, 2018	May 31, 2018	Sep 14, 2018	Unreleased	M	
Rollercoaster Tycoon Joyride	Simulation	Nvizzio Creations	Atari	Dec 13, 2018	Oct 23, 2018	Unreleased	Unreleased	BD	
The Room VR: A Dark Matter	Puzzle	Fireproof Games	Fireproof Studios	Mar 26, 2020	Mar 26, 2020	Unreleased	Unreleased	M	
Rooms: The Usolvable Puzzle	Puzzle	Handmade Game	Handmade Game	Jun 19, 2018	Unreleased	Mar 23, 2018	Unreleased		
Run Dorothy Run	Arcade	Virtro Entertainment	Virtro Entertainment	Feb 20, 2018	Unreleased	Unreleased	Unreleased	M	
Rush VR	Sports	The Binary Mill	The Binary Mill	Dec 4, 2018	Dec 4, 2018	Dec 13, 2018	Dec 26, 2018	M BD	
Rhythm 'n Bullets	Shooter, rhythm	DB Creations	DB Creations	Jul 22, 2021	Jul 22, 2021	Unreleased	Unreleased		
Sabre VR		Fire Point	Fire Point	Jul 23, 2019	Unreleased	Unreleased	Unreleased	M	
Sacralith: The Archer`s Tale	Action	Odd-meter Studio	Odd-meter Studio	Dec 17, 2019	Dec 17, 2019	Unreleased	Unreleased	M	
Sairento VR	First-person shooter	Mixed Realms	Mixed Realms	May 3, 2019	Jul 5, 2019	Oct 17, 2019	Unreleased	M BD	
Salary Man Escape	Puzzle	Oasis Games	Oasis Games	Jun 26, 2018	Jun 26, 2018	Nov 22, 2018	Nov 8, 2018	M	
SculptrVR	Action, adventure	SculptrVR	SculptrVR	Jun 19, 2018	Aug 31, 2018	Unreleased	Unreleased	M	
Sea of Memories	Puzzle	Ivanovich Games	Ivanovich Games	Jul 26, 2018	Jul 19, 2018	Unreleased	Unreleased	M	
Sega Genesis Classics	Action, Platform	Sega	Sega	May 29, 2018	May 29, 2018	Unreleased	Unreleased		
Senran Kagura Peach Beach Splash Sunshine Edition	Shooter	Tamsoft	Marvelous Inc.	Unreleased	Unreleased	Jul 25, 2017	Unreleased	BD	
Separation		Recluse Industries	Recluse Industries	Mar 4, 2020	Mar 3, 2020	Unreleased	Unreleased		
Shadow Legend VR		VitruviusVR	VitruviusVR	Jan 21, 2020	Jan 21, 2020	Unreleased	Unreleased	M	
Sharknado VR: Eye of the Storm		Autumn VR	Autumn VR	Apr 8, 2020	Unreleased	Unreleased	Unreleased	M	
Shooty Fruity	Action, shooter	nDreams	nDreams	Dec 19, 2017	Dec 19, 2017	Dec 26, 2017	Dec 19, 2017	M	
Shuttle Commander	Simulation	Immersive VR Education	Immersive VR Education	Unreleased	Dec 3, 2019	Unreleased	Unreleased		
Ski Jumping Pro VR	Sports	Kalypso Media	Kalypso Media	Dec 6, 2019	Unreleased	Unreleased	Unreleased		
SkyWorld	Strategy	Vertigo Games	Vertigo Games	Mar 26, 2019	Mar 26, 2019	Apr 18, 2019	Unreleased	M	
Slum Ball VR		U24 Solutions	U24 Solutions	Jun 18, 2019	Unreleased	Unreleased	Unreleased	M	
Smash Hit Plunder	Arcade	Triangular Pixels	Triangular Pixels	Jan 15, 2019	Oct 5, 2018	Unreleased	Unreleased	M BD	
Smashbox Arena	Shooter	Archiact	BigBox VR	Jul 25, 2017	Jul 25, 2017	Jul 25, 2017	Unreleased	M	
Sneaky Bears	Action, Shooter	WarDucks	WarDucks	Aug 29, 2017	Aug 31, 2017	Dec 8, 2017	Unreleased	M	
Sniper Elite VR	Tactical shooter, stealth	Just Add Water	Rebellion Developments	Jul 8, 2021	Jul 8, 2021	Unreleased	Unreleased	A	
Snow Fortress	Action, Shooter	Mythical City Games	Mythical City Games	Dec 6, 2017	Unreleased	Unreleased	Unreleased	M	
Squishies	Action, puzzle	Brainseed Factory	Brainseed Factory	Nov 20, 2018	Nov 20, 2018	Unreleased	Unreleased	M BD	
Soul Dimension	Adventure, Puzzle, Horror	Keen Vision	TVR	Aug 22, 2017	Aug 22, 2017	Aug 22, 2017	Aug 23, 2017		
Space Channel 5 VR	Music, rhythm	Grounding	Grounding	Feb 25, 2020	Feb 26, 2020	Feb 26, 2020	Feb 26, 2020	M BD	
Space Junkies		Ubisoft Montpellier	Ubisoft	Mar 26, 2019	Mar 26, 2019	May 23, 2019	Unreleased	M BD	
Space Pirate Trainer	Action, Shooter	I-Illusions	I-Illusions	Nov 27, 2018	Nov 27, 2018	Unreleased	Unreleased	M	
Space Rift	Space Adventure	bitComposer	bitComposer	Nov 15, 2016	Nov 15, 2016	Unreleased	Unreleased		
Sparc	Sports	CCP Games	CCP Games	Aug 29, 2017	Aug 29, 2017	Unreleased	Unreleased	M Rift Vive	
Special Delivery	Sports	Meerkat Gaming	Meerkat Gaming	Jun 6, 2017	Oct 20, 2017	Apr 6, 2018	Unreleased	A M	
Spice and Wolf VR	Interactive movie	Spicy Tails	Spicy Tails	Sep 5, 2019	Sep 19, 2019	Sep 5, 2019	Unreleased		
Sports Bar VR	Sports	Cherry Pop Games	Cherry Pop Games	Oct 13, 2016	Oct 13, 2016	Mar 6, 2019	Unreleased	M Rift Vive	
Sprint Vector	Action, Course	Survios	Survios	Feb 13, 2018	Feb 13, 2018	Oct 11, 2019	Unreleased	M Rift Vive BD	
Spooky's Jump Scare Mansion: HD	Action, adventure	Albino Moose Games	Albino Moose Games	Oct 29, 2019	Unreleased	Unreleased	Unreleased		
Spuds Unearthed		Gamedust	Gamedust	Apr 23, 2020	Apr 23, 2020	Unreleased	Unreleased	M	
Starbear: Taxi	Arena, Shooter	Funktronic Labs	Funktronic Labs	Nov 6, 2018	Unreleased	Unreleased	Unreleased	M	
StarDrone	Action, Arcade	Beatshapers	Beatshapers	Jan 17, 2018	Jan 24, 2018	Unreleased	Unreleased	M	
Stardust Odyssey	Action, adventure	Agharta Studio	Agharta Studio	Dec 3, 2019	Dec 3, 2019	Unreleased	Unreleased	M	
Starship Disco	Rhythm, Shooter	Solus Games	Solus Games	Dec 15, 2016	Dec 21, 2016	Unreleased	Unreleased	M	
Star Trek: Bridge Crew	Social, Adventure	Red Storm Entertainment	Ubisoft	May 30, 2017	May 30, 2017	Unreleased	May 31, 2017	M Rift Vive BD	
Rogue One: X-Wing VR Mission	Space Shooter	Criterion Games	Electronic Arts	Dec 6, 2016	Dec 6, 2016	Dec 7, 2016	Dec 7, 2016	BD	
Star Wars: Squadrons	Space combat	Motive Studios	Electronic Arts	Oct 2, 2020	Oct 2, 2020	Oct 2, 2020	Unreleased	H BD	
Statik	Puzzle	Tarsier Studios	Tarsier Studios	Apr 24, 2017	Apr 24, 2017	Unreleased	Apr 25, 2017		
Steel Combat	Fighting	Colopl	Colopl	Unreleased	Unreleased	Feb 28, 2017	Unreleased		
Stifled	Action, horror	Gattai Games	Gattai Games	Oct 31, 2017	Oct 31, 2017	Jul 5, 2017	Apr 24, 2018		
Stunt Kite Masters VR	Simulation	HandyGames	HandyGames	Oct 25, 2017	Oct 25, 2017	Unreleased	Unreleased	M	
Summer Funland		Monad Rock	Monad Rock	Mar 1, 2019	Jun 4, 2019	Unreleased	Unreleased	M	
Summer Lesson: Allison Snow	Simulation	Bandai Namco Ent.	Bandai Namco Ent.	Unreleased	Unreleased	Jun 22, 2017	Aug 23, 2018	BD	
Summer Lesson: Chisato Shinjo	Simulation	Bandai Namco Ent.	Bandai Namco Ent.	Unreleased	Unreleased	Oct 12, 2017	Aug 23, 2018	BD	
Summer Lesson: Hikari Miyamoto	Simulation	Bandai Namco Ent.	Bandai Namco Ent.	Unreleased	Unreleased	Oct 13, 2016	Apr 27, 2017	BD	
Super Amazeballs	Action	Braincells Productions	Braincells Productions	Unreleased	Unreleased	Apr 10, 2018	Unreleased	M	
Superhot VR	First-person shooter	Superhot Team	Superhot Team	Jul 21, 2017	Jul 19, 2017	Jul 21, 2017	Unreleased	M BD	
SuperHyperCube	Puzzle	Kokoromi	Kokoromi	Oct 13, 2016	Oct 13, 2016	Aug 16, 2018	Oct 13, 2016		
Super Stardust Ultra VR	Shooter	Sony XDev	Sony Interactive Entertainment	Oct 13, 2016	Oct 13, 2016	Dec 12, 2016	Oct 13, 2016	BD	
Surgeon Simulator: Experience Reality	Simulation	Bossa Studios	Bossa Studios	Dec 3, 2016	Dec 3, 2016	Unreleased	Unreleased	M	
Symphony of the Machine	Puzzle	Stirfire Studios	Stirfire Studios	Apr 25, 2017	Apr 26, 2017	Apr 28, 2017	Apr 27, 2017	M	(Note: Not available on Dutch PSN store.)
Syndrome	First-person, survival	Camel 101	Bigmoon Ent.	Oct 6, 2017	Oct 11, 2017	Oct 11, 2017	Unreleased	BD	
Synth Riders	Rhythm	Kluge Interactive	Kluge Interactive	Aug 10, 2021	Aug 10, 2021	Aug 10,2021	Aug 10, 2021	M	
Syren	Survival horror	Hammerhead VR	Hammerhead VR	Nov 6, 2018	Oct 31, 2019	Unreleased	Unreleased	M	
Table of Tales: The Crooked Crown	Digital tabletop	Tin Man Games	Tin Man Games	Apr 16, 2019	Apr 16, 2019	Unreleased	Unreleased	M	
Tale of the Fragmented Star: Single Fragment Version	Adventure	ForgeVision	Mediascape	Apr 30, 2019	Unreleased	Jan 26, 2018	Unreleased		
Tekken 7	Fighting	Bandai Namco Ent.	Bandai Namco Ent.	Jun 2, 2017	Jun 2, 2017	Jun 1, 2017	Jun 1, 2017	BD	
Telefrag VR		Anshar Studios	Anshar Studios	Jul 19, 2019	Jul 19, 2019	Unreleased	Unreleased	M	
Tethered	Simulation	Secret Sorcery	Secret Sorcery	Oct 28, 2016	Oct 28, 2016	Dec 22, 2016	Oct 26, 2016	M	
Tetris Effect	Puzzle	Enhance Games	Enhance Games	Nov 9, 2018	Nov 9, 2018	Nov 9, 2018	Nov 9, 2018	BD	
Theseus	Action	Forge Reply	Forge Reply	Jul 26, 2017	May 26, 2017	Unreleased	Unreleased	BD	
The Wizards: Enhanced Edition		Carbon Studio	Carbon Studio	Mar 12, 2019	Mar 12, 2019	Unreleased	Unreleased	M BD	
Throw Anything	Action	VisualLight	VisualLight	Feb 6, 2020	Feb 6, 2020	Unreleased	Unreleased	M	
Thumper	Rhythm	Drool	Drool	Oct 13, 2016	Oct 13, 2016	Oct 13, 2016	Oct 13, 2016	BD	
Tilt Brush by Google	Adventure, paint	Google	Google	Mar 27, 2020	Mar 27, 2020	Unreleased	Unreleased	M	
Time Carnage	Action	Wales Interactive	Wales Interactive	Apr 10, 2018	Apr 10, 2018	Unreleased	Unreleased	BD	
Time Machine VR	Interactive Experience	Minority Media	Minority Media	Nov 15, 2016	Nov 18, 2016	Unreleased	Unreleased		
Tiny Trax	Racing	FuturLab	FuturLab	Jul 25, 2017	Jul 25, 2017	Jul 25, 2017	Unreleased		
Titanic VR	Interactive Experience	Immersive VR Education	Immersive VR Education	Nov 22, 2018	Nov 27, 2018	Unreleased	Unreleased	M	
To the top	Action, adventure	Electric Hat Games	Electric Hat Games	May 29, 2018	May 29, 2018	Unreleased	Unreleased	M BD	
Tokyo Chronos		MyDearest	Limited Run Games, Sekai Project	Aug 26, 2019	Unreleased	Aug 22, 2018	Unreleased	M BD	
Touhou Kobuto V: Burst Battle	Action	Team Shanghai Alice; Mediascape; CUBETYPE	NIS America	Oct 10, 2017	Oct 13, 2017	Unreleased	Unreleased	BD	
Touring Karts		Ivanovich Games	Ivanovich Games	Dec 12, 2019	Dec 12, 2019	Unreleased	Unreleased	M	
Track Lab	Music	Sony Interactive Ent.	Sony Interactive Ent.	Aug 21, 2018	Aug 22, 2018	Unreleased	Unreleased	M BD	
TrackMania Turbo: VR Levels	Racing	Nadeo	Ubisoft	Nov 8, 2016	Nov 8, 2016	Nov 8, 2016	Nov 8, 2016	Rift Vive BD	
Trainer VR	Casual, Indie, Simulation	Sumalab	Sumalab	Jan 29, 2019	Feb 5, 2019	Unreleased	Unreleased	M	
Transference	Adventure, puzzle	Ubisoft	Ubisoft	Sep 18, 2018	Sep 18, 2018	Nov 1, 2018	Nov 1, 2018	BD	
Transpose	Puzzle	Secret Location	Secret Location	Nov 6, 2018	Dec 21, 2018	Unreleased	Unreleased	M	
Trickster VR: Dungeon Crawler	First-Person	Trickster Games	Trickster Games	Sep 18, 2018	Nov 21, 2018	Unreleased	Unreleased	M	
Trover Saves the Universe		Squanch Games	Squanch Games	May 31, 2019	May 31, 2019	May 31, 2019	May 31, 2019	BD	
Tumble VR	Puzzle	Supermassive Games	Sony Interactive Ent.	Oct 13, 2016	Oct 13, 2016	Nov 17, 2016	Oct 13, 2016	M	
Twisty Puzzle Simulator	Puzzle	Vizioneck	Vizioneck	Nov 27, 2018	Unreleased	Unreleased	Unreleased	M	
Ultrawings	Flight, open world	Bit Planet Games	Bit Planet Games	Dec 19, 2017	Dec 19, 2017	Jul 5, 2018	Unreleased	H M BD	
Unearthing Mars	Interactive, Adventure	Winking Ent.	Winking Ent.	Mar 7, 2017	Mar 7, 2017	Mar 7, 2017	Jan 19, 2017	M BD	
Unearthing Mars 2: The Ancient War	Interactive, Adventure	Winking Ent.	Winking Ent.	Sep 18, 2018	Sep 19, 2018	Sep 20, 2018	Unreleased	A BD	
Until Dawn: Rush of Blood	Survival Horror	Supermassive Games	Sony Interactive Ent.	Oct 13, 2016	Oct 13, 2016	Oct 13, 2016	Oct 13, 2016	M BD	
Until You Fall	Hack and slash, roguelite	Schell Games	Schell Games	Sep 29, 2020	Sep 29, 2020	Unreleased	Unreleased		
Vacation Simulator	Simulation	Owlchemy Labs	Owlchemy Labs	Jun 18, 2019	Unreleased	Unreleased	Jun 21, 2019	M	
Vader Immortal: A Star Wars VR Series	Simulation	ILMxLAB	ILMxLAB	Aug 25, 2020	Aug 25, 2020	Aug 28, 2020	Unreleased	M	
Verti-GO Home!	Action	Trucker VR	Trucker VR	Mar 8, 2019	Mar 11, 2019	Unreleased	Unreleased		
VEV: Viva Ex Vivo	Survival, Adventure	Truant Pixel	Truant Pixel	May 17, 2016	May 17, 2016	Unreleased	Unreleased		
Vigilante Ranger	Tower defense	Sinergia Studios	Sinergia Studios	Jan 28, 2020	Unreleased	Unreleased	Unreleased	M	
Viking Days	Simulation	VRMonkey	VRMonkey	Aug 28, 2018	Jan 28, 2020	Unreleased	Unreleased	M	
The Virtual Orchestra (Premium)	Music	Sony Interactive Ent.	Sony Interactive Ent.	Unreleased	May 8, 2017	Unreleased	Unreleased		
Virtual Virtual Reality	Adventure	Tender Claws	Tender Claws	May 21, 2019	Unreleased	Unreleased	Jun 18, 2019	M	
VirtuGO	Puzzle	Surreal Games	Surreal Games	Dec 19, 2017	Unreleased	Unreleased	Unreleased		
Volume: Coda	Stealth, Puzzle	Mike Bithell Games	Mike Bithell Games	Oct 13, 2016	Oct 13, 2016	Unreleased	Jun 28, 2017	BD	
VR Apocalypse	Arcade racing	NextGen Interactions	NextGen Interactions	Dec 19, 2018	Unreleased	Unreleased	Unreleased		
VR The Diner Duo	Simulation	Whirlybird Games	Whirlybird Games	Dec 15, 2017	Dec 18, 2017	Unreleased	Unreleased	M	
VR Figure from Shining	Simulation	Sega	Sega	Unreleased	Unreleased	Jul 11, 2018	Unreleased		
VR Invaders - Complete Edition	First-person	My.com	My.com	Apr 18, 2017	Apr 18, 2017	Unreleased	Unreleased	M	
VR Karts	Arcade racing	View Point Games	View Point Games	Sep 12, 2017	May 11, 2017	Unreleased	Unreleased	BD	
VR Ping Pong	Sports	Merge Games	Merge Games	Feb 7, 2017	Feb 8, 2017	Unreleased	Unreleased	M BD	
VR Ping Pong Pro	Sports	Merge Games	Merge Games	Nov 12, 2019	Nov 12, 2019	Unreleased	Unreleased	M BD	
VR Tennis Online	Sports	COLOPL	COLOPL	Unreleased	Unreleased	Feb 16, 2017	Unreleased		
VRFC Virtual Reality Football Club	Sports	Cherry Pop Games	Cherry Pop Games	Mar 6, 2018	Mar 6, 2018	Unreleased	Unreleased		
VRobot	Action	Nival	Nival	Jul 24, 2018	Jun 19, 2018	Unreleased	Unreleased	M	
VRog	Action	ByteRockers' Games GmbH & Co. KG	ByteRockers' Games GmbH & Co. KG	Oct 14, 2017	Jul 31, 2017	Unreleased	Unreleased		
Vroom Kaboom	Action, racing	Ratloop Games Canada	Ratloop Games Canada	Aug 14, 2018	Aug 14, 2018	Unreleased	Unreleased	M	
Waddle Home	Puzzle	Archiact Int.	Archiact Int.	Oct 13, 2016	Oct 13, 2016	Unreleased	Unreleased	M	
The Walker	Action, shooter	Winking Skywalker	Winking Skywalker	Jul 3, 2018	Jul 4, 2018	Jul 5, 2018	Jul 5, 2018	M	
The Walking Dead: Onslaught	Action, Horror	Survios	Survios	Sep 29, 2020	Sep 29, 2020	Sep 29, 2020	Sep 29, 2020	M	
The Walking Dead: Saints & Sinners	Action, horror	Skydance Interactive	Skydance Interactive	May 5, 2020	May 5, 2020	Unreleased	Unreleased	M BD	
The Walking Dead: Saints & Sinners – Chapter 2: Retribution	Action, horror	Skydance Interactive	Skydance Interactive	2023	2023	Unreleased	Unreleased	M BD	
Waltz of the Wizard	Interactive Experience	Aldin Dynamics	Aldin Dynamics	Aug 27, 2019	Aug 27, 2019	Unreleased	Unreleased	M	
Wands	Interactive Experience	Aldin Dynamics	Aldin Dynamics	Oct 15, 2019	Oct 9, 2019	Unreleased	Unreleased	M	
Warbot	Fighting	Shanghai Lusion Computer Software	Shanghai Lusion Computer Software	Dec 11, 2018	Dec 18, 2018	Unreleased	Dec 21, 2018	M	
Wayward Sky	Adventure, Puzzle	Uber Entertainment	Uber Entertainment	Oct 10, 2016	Oct 10, 2016	Unreleased	Oct 13, 2016	M	
Weeping Doll	Horror	Oasis Games	Oasis Games	Oct 27, 2016	Oct 27, 2016	Unreleased	Nov 2, 2016	BD	
Werewolves Within	Social	Red Storm Entertainment	Ubisoft	Dec 6, 2016	Dec 6, 2016	Dec 7, 2016	Dec 7, 2016	Rift Vive BD	
Wild Turkey Hunter VR	Action, sports	PSR Outdoors	PSR Outdoors	Aug 3, 2018	Unreleased	Unreleased	Unreleased		
Windlands	Adventure	Psytec Games	Psytec Games	Oct 25, 2016	Oct 25, 2016	Jun 30, 2017	Unreleased	M	
Wipeout Omega Collection	Racing	Sony XDev Europe	Sony Interactive Entertainment	Mar 28, 2018	Mar 28, 2018	Unreleased	Unreleased	BD	
Witching Tower VR		Daily Magic Productions	Daily Magic Productions	Sep 17, 2019	Sep 17, 2019	Unreleased	Unreleased	M	
Wolfenstein: Cyberpilot	Shooter	Arkane Studios; MachineGames	Bethesda Game Studios	Jul 26, 2019	Jul 26, 2019	Aug 8, 2019	Jul 26, 2019	M BD	
Wraith	Action, Shooter, Survival, Horror	Sinn Studio	Sinn Studio	May 29, 2018	Jun 27, 2019	Unreleased	Unreleased	A M	
Wraith: The Oblivion - Afterlife	Survival, Horror	Fast Travel Games	Fast Travel Games	April 29, 2021	April 29, 2021	Unreleased	Unreleased	M	
Xing: The Land Beyond	Adventure, Puzzle	White Lotus	White Lotus	Feb 13, 2019	Feb 13, 2019	Unreleased	Unreleased	M	
Xeta	Shooter	Fevolution Innovation	Fevolution Innovation	Unreleased	Unreleased	Unreleased	Aug 29, 2017	M	
Zone of the Enders: The 2nd Runner Mars	Third-person shooter	Cygames	Konami	Sep 6, 2018	Sep 6, 2018	Sep 6, 2018	Sep 4, 2018	BD	

== Free-to-play ==
Title	Genre(s)	Developer(s)	Publisher(s)	Release date			Addon(s)	Ref.
Title	Genre(s)	Developer(s)	Publisher(s)	North America	Europe	Japan	Addon(s)	Ref.
360Channel VR	Streaming cinema	360Channel	360Channel	Unreleased	Unreleased	Apr 12, 2017		
Allumette	Interactive Movie	Penrose Studios	Penrose Studios	Oct 13, 2016	Oct 13, 2016	Oct 13, 2016		
AnywhereVR		Sony Music Entertainment Japan	Sony Music Entertainment Japan	Oct 6, 2017	Oct 27, 2017	Dec 8, 2016		(Note: Not available on Dutch PSN store.)
Anubis Zone of the Enders: Mars Orange Case	Third-person shooter	Cygames	Konami	Aug 24, 2018	Aug 24, 2018	Aug 24, 2018		
Air Force Special Ops: Nightfall	Simulation	Sony Interactive Entertainment	Sony Interactive Entertainment	Jun 20, 2017	Unreleased	Unreleased	M	
Atom Universe	Party, social	Atom Republic	Atom Republic	Sep 14, 2016	Sep 28, 2016	Unreleased	Rift Vive	
Call of Duty: Infinite Warfare Jackal Assault VR Experience	Action	Infinity Ward, Paper Crane Games	Activision	Nov 4, 2016	Nov 4, 2016	Unreleased		
The Chainsmokers Paris.VR	Interactive Experience	Sony Music Entertainment	Sony Music Entertainment	Apr 28, 2017	Jun 28, 2017	May 31, 2017		
Crow: The Legend	Interactive Experience	Baobab Studios	Baobab Studios	Nov 20, 2018	Nov 20, 2018	Unreleased	M	
Dark Eclipse	MOBA, RTS	Sunsoft	Sunsoft	Sep 25, 2018	Sep 25, 2018	Unreleased	M	
The Detective invisible	Interactive Experience	Sony Interactive Entertainment	Sony Interactive Entertainment	Unreleased	Unreleased	Mar 6, 2018		
Fate/Grand Order VR feat. Mashu Kyrielight		Type-Moon	Aniplex	Feb 26, 2019	Feb 26, 2019	Dec 6, 2017		
Gary the Gull	Interactive Movie	Limitless / Motional	Limitless / Motional	Nov 22, 2016	Unreleased	Unreleased	M	
GOT7 Love Loop VR	Music	Sony Music Labels	Sony Music Labels	Jan 7, 2020	Jan 7, 2020	Unreleased		
Hatsune Miku: VR Future Live	Simulation	Sega	Sega	Oct 13, 2016	Oct 13, 2016	Oct 13, 2016	M	
Hikaru Utada Laughter in the Dark Tour 2018	Music	Sony Interactive Entertainment	Sony Interactive Entertainment	Jan 18, 2019	Jan 18, 2019	Dec 26, 2018		
The Illusionist-Andres Iniesta	Unique	Gamepoch	Gamepoch	Nov 22, 2017	Mar 6, 2018	Apr 9, 2018		
Inception VR	Interactive experience	Inception VR	Inception VR	Feb 1, 2018	Unreleased	Jun 6, 2018		
In the Cloud: VR Afterlife	Interactive experience	Crackle	Crackle	Feb 1, 2018	Unreleased	Unreleased		
Invasion!	Interactive movie	Baobab Studios	Baobab Studios	Oct 10, 2016	Oct 10, 2016	Unreleased		
Joshua Bell VR Experience	Music	Sony Interactive Entertainment	Sony Interactive Entertainment	Feb 14, 2017	Feb 14, 2017	Feb 14, 2017		
Joysound VR	Music	Xing	Sony Interactive Entertainment	Unreleased	Unreleased	Oct 13, 2016		
Kamen Rider Ex-Aid: Genmu VR	Interactive Experience, Party	Sony Interactive Entertainment	Sony Interactive Entertainment	Unreleased	Unreleased	Aug 18, 2017		
Kamen Rider Ex-Aid: True Ending	Interactive Movie	Sony Interactive Entertainment	Sony Interactive Entertainment	Unreleased	Unreleased	Jul 14, 2017		
Khalid Young Dumb and Broke VR	Interactive Movie	Sony Music Entertainment	Sony Music Entertainment	Mar 28, 2018	Apr 25, 2018	Mar 29, 2018	M	
Kingdom Hearts VR Experience	RPG	Square Enix	Square Enix	Jan 23, 2019	Feb 28, 2019	Unreleased	M	
Kizumonogatari VR	Interactive Movie	Aniplex	Aniplex	Unreleased	Unreleased	Jul 12, 2017	M	
The Last Guardian VR Demo	Action, adventure	Sony Interactive Entertainment	Sony Interactive Entertainment	Dec 12, 2017	Dec 12, 2017	Dec 14, 2017		
Legends of Catalonia: The Land of Barcelona	Adventure	The Greyskull Company	The Greyskull Company	Nov 2, 2018	Nov 2, 2018	Jul 4, 2019	M	
Lens for PS VR	Streaming cinema	Lens Entertainment	Lens Entertainment	Jan 4, 2017	Feb 13, 2017	Unreleased		
Littlstar	Streaming cinema	Little Star Media	Little Star Media	Oct 10, 2016	Oct 10, 2016	Oct 10, 2016		
The Ministry of Time VR: Save the time	Simulation, adventure	El Faro Del Futuro	El Faro Del Futuro	Unreleased	Oct 27, 2017	Unreleased		
Stranger Things: The VR-Experience	Adventure	Netflix	Netflix	Unreleased	Dec 12, 2017	Unreleased	M	(Note: Not available on Dutch PSN store.)
NewsVR	Streaming video	Asahi Shimbun corporation	Asahi Shimbun corporation	Unreleased	Unreleased	Dec 26, 2017		
NextVR	Streaming video	NextVR	NextVR	Oct 20, 2017	Unreleased	Unreleased		
The Playroom VR	Party	Japan Studio (Team Asobi)	Sony Interactive Entertainment	Oct 13, 2016	Oct 13, 2016	Oct 13, 2016		
Rec Room	Virtual community; party games	Against Gravity	Against Gravity	Nov 21, 2017	Nov 21, 2017	Jun 15, 2020	M Rift Vive	
Resident Evil Vendetta: Z Infected Experience	Interactive experience	Marza Animation Planet	Marza Animation Planet	Unreleased	Unreleased	May 25, 2017	BD	
Snatch VR Heist Experience	Interactive experience	Crackle	Crackle	Jan 16, 2018	Unreleased	Unreleased		
Spider-Man: Far From Home - Virtual Reality Experience	Action	Sony Pictures Virtual Reality	Sony Pictures Virtual Reality	Jun 25, 2019	Jun 25, 2019	Unreleased	M	
Spider-Man: Homecoming - Virtual Reality Experience	Action	Sony Pictures Virtual Reality	Sony Pictures Virtual Reality	Jun 30, 2017	Jun 30, 2017	Dec 20, 2017	M	
Theater Room VR Beta	Streaming video	Sony Interactive Entertainment	Sony Interactive Entertainment	Unreleased	Unreleased	Apr 11, 2018		
Tom Grennan VR	Interactive Movie	Sony Music Entertainment	Sony Music Entertainment	Jul 27, 2018	Jul 27, 2018	Jul 27, 2018		
Ultra Kabuki VR		Dwango	Dwango	Unreleased	Unreleased	Apr 13, 2018	M	
VirZoom Arcade	Racing	VirZoom	VirZoom	Nov 22, 2016	Feb 15, 2017	Unreleased		
We Happy Few: Uncle Jack Live VR	Adventure	Gearbox Publishing	Gearbox Publishing	Aug 8, 2018	Aug 8, 2018	Unreleased	M	
Within	Streaming cinema	Within Unlimited	Within Unlimited	Oct 10, 2016	Dec 8, 2016	Unreleased		

== See also ==
- List of PlayStation 4 games
- List of PlayStation applications
- List of Oculus Rift games
- List of Oculus Quest games
- List of HTC Vive games
- List of PlayStation VR2 games
