= E3 2015 =

21st annual Electronic Entertainment Expo

Electronic Entertainment Expo 2015
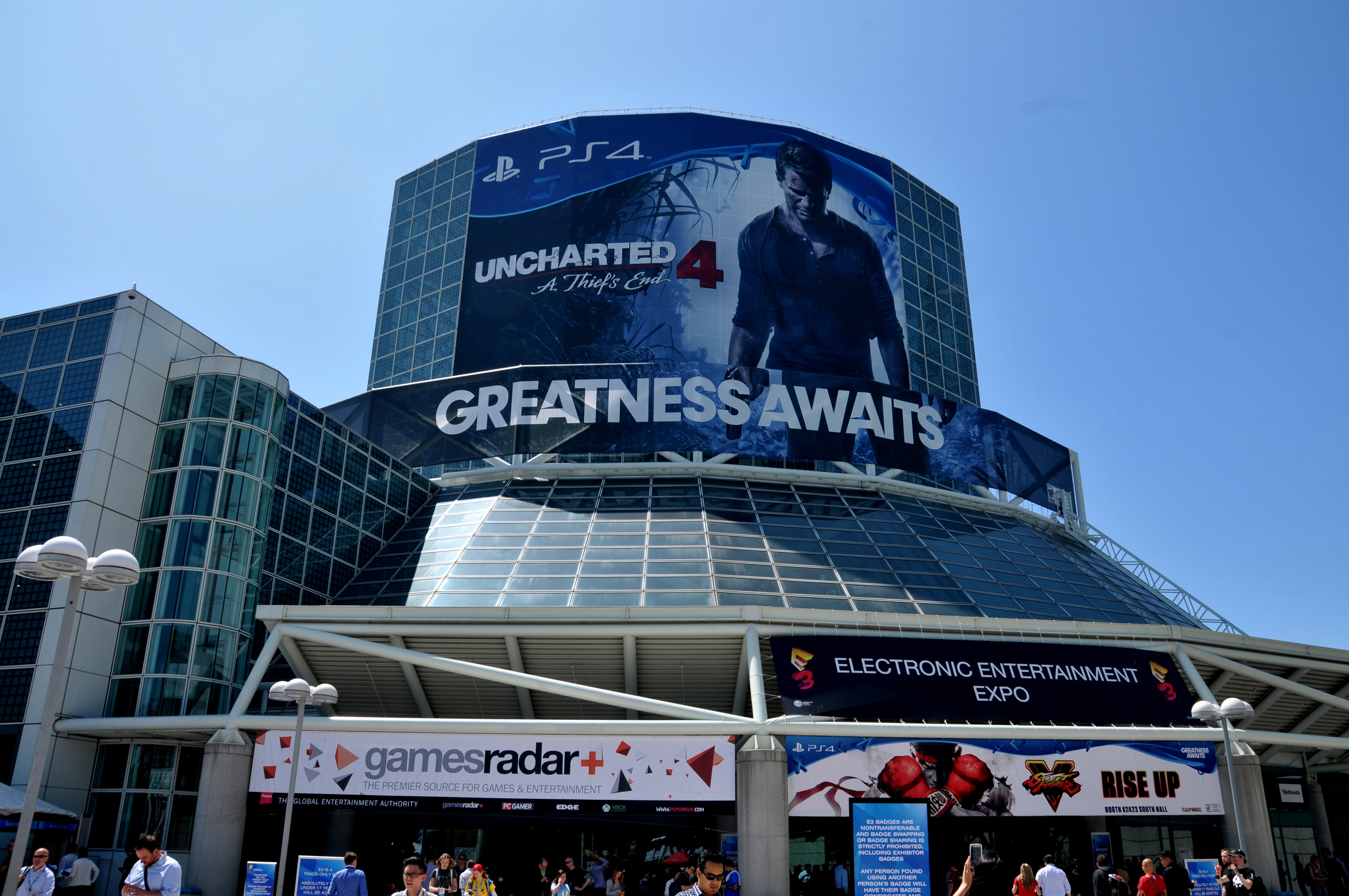
- The Los Angeles Convention Center during E3 2015, with Uncharted 4: A Thief's End and Street Fighter V occupying entrance advertising
- Genre: Multi-genre
- Begins: June 16, 2015
- Ends: June 18, 2015
- Venue: Los Angeles Convention Center
- Locations: Los Angeles, California
- Country: United States
- Previous event: E3 2014
- Next event: E3 2016
- Attendance: 52,200
- Organizer: Entertainment Software Association
- Filing status: Non-profit

The Electronic Entertainment Expo 2015 (E3 2015) was the 21st E3 held. The event took place at the Los Angeles Convention Center in Los Angeles, California. It took place from June 16 to June 18, 2015, with 52,200 total attendees.

Major exhibitors at the convention included Activision Blizzard, Atlus, Bethesda Softworks, Electronic Arts, Microsoft Studios, Nintendo, Nvidia, Sony Computer Entertainment, Square Enix and Ubisoft.

While E3 is a closed event to only members of the video game industry and the media, the Entertainment Software Association (ESA) allowed access to the event from gamers for the first time by distributing 5,000 tickets the various exhibitors that they subsequently distributed to their fans.

== Press conferences ==
=== Oculus ===
Oculus VR hosted a pre-E3 press conference on June 11, 2015 at 10:00 a.m. During the conference, Oculus Rift's final design was revealed. Oculus Touch, a controller for the Rift, as well as exclusives, including Damaged Core from High Voltage Software, VR Sports Challenge from Sanzaru Games, Chronos from Gunfire Games and Edge of Nowhere from Insomniac Games were announced.

=== Bethesda ===
Bethesda hosted its first ever E3 press conference on June 14 at 7:00 p.m. During the conference, Bethesda Softworks revealed Fallout Shelter, Dishonored: Definitive Edition, Dishonored 2, as well as The Elder Scrolls: Legends, a card game set within the Elder Scrolls universe. Release windows, trailers and gameplay demo were released for Fallout 4, Doom and BattleCry.

=== Microsoft ===
Microsoft hosted a press conference on June 15 at 9:30 a.m. During the conference, Microsoft announced ReCore, Xbox One backward compatibility, a new Elite controller, Plants vs. Zombies: Garden Warfare 2, Dark Souls III, Ashen, Beyond Eyes, Ion, Rare Replay, Sea of Thieves and Gears of War: Ultimate Edition and showed footage of Halo 5: Guardians, Forza Motorsport 6, Fallout 4 with mod support, Tom Clancy's The Division, Tom Clancy's Rainbow Six Siege, Gigantic, Tacoma, Cuphead, Rise of the Tomb Raider, Fable Legends, a version of Minecraft compatible with Microsoft HoloLens and Gears of War 4.

=== Electronic Arts ===
Electronic Arts hosted a press conference on June 15 at 1:00 p.m. The conference lasted for an hour. During the conference, Electronic Arts announced Mass Effect Andromeda, showed gameplay of Need for Speed, announced the Star Wars: The Old Republic – Knights of the Fallen Empire, Unravel, showed gameplay of Plants vs. Zombies: Garden Warfare 2, announced NHL 16, NBA Live 16, Star Wars: Galaxy of Heroes, Minions Paradise, showed footage of FIFA 16, showed gameplay of Mirror's Edge Catalyst, showed footage of Madden NFL 16 and showed gameplay of Star Wars Battlefront.

=== Ubisoft ===
Ubisoft hosted a press conference on June 15 at 3:00 p.m. During the conference, Ubisoft announced South Park: The Fractured but Whole, a new IP titled For Honor, The Crew Wild Run, Trials Fusion: Awesome Level Max, Anno 2205, Just Dance 2016, Trackmania Turbo and Tom Clancy's Ghost Recon Wildlands and showed gameplay of Tom Clancy's The Division, Tom Clancy's Rainbow Six Siege and Assassin's Creed Syndicate.

=== Sony ===
Sony hosted a press conference on June 15 at 6:00 p.m. During the conference, Sony re-announced The Last Guardian, announced a new IP titled Horizon Zero Dawn, Hitman, Dreams, Firewatch, Destiny: The Taken King, Final Fantasy VII Remake, and Shenmue III, in addition to showing footage of No Man's Sky, Assassin's Creed Syndicate, Batman: Arkham Knight, Call of Duty: Black Ops III, Disney Infinity 3.0, Star Wars: Battlefront, Ratchet & Clank and Uncharted 4: A Thief's End.

=== Nintendo ===
Nintendo, for a third consecutive E3, decided to forego hosting a traditional press conference in favor of a Nintendo Digital Event—a pre-recorded video presentation that was streamed online on June 16 at 9:00 a.m. with an accompanying press release. Prior to E3, Nintendo also held an event, the Nintendo World Championships 2015 (a competition in which a group of players participated in a multi-round competition across multiple Nintendo games), and also featured the announcement of new content for Super Smash Bros. for Nintendo 3DS and Wii U, EarthBound Beginnings, Blast Ball, and new gameplay of Super Mario Maker as part of the competition's finale. During the Digital Event, Nintendo announced Star Fox Zero, amiibo figures compatible with Skylanders: SuperChargers, The Legend of Zelda: Tri Force Heroes, Hyrule Warriors Legends, Metroid Prime: Federation Force, Fire Emblem Fates, Tokyo Mirage Sessions ♯FE, showed footage of Xenoblade Chronicles X, announced Animal Crossing: Happy Home Designer, Animal Crossing: amiibo Festival, showed footage of Yoshi's Woolly World, announced Yo-kai Watch, Mario & Luigi: Paper Jam, Mario Tennis: Ultra Smash and showed footage of Super Mario Maker.

=== Square Enix ===
Square Enix hosted a press conference on June 16 at 10:00 a.m. During the conference, Square Enix announced Nier: Automata under the provisional title Nier New Project, Lara Croft Go, Kingdom Hearts Unchained χ, Star Ocean: Integrity and Faithlessness and a new IP titled I Am Setsuna and showed footage of Just Cause 3, Rise of the Tomb Raider, Kingdom Hearts III, World of Final Fantasy, Hitman and Deus Ex: Mankind Divided. Announcement footage of Final Fantasy VII Remake was revealed as part of Sony's presentation.

=== PC Gaming Show ===
A webcast focusing on PC gaming was held on June 16 at 5:00 p.m. by gaming magazine PC Gamer and AMD, and hosted by Sean Plott. Representatives of studios including Blizzard Entertainment, Microsoft Studios, Bohemia Interactive, Paradox Interactive, Obsidian Entertainment, as well as Tripwire Interactive, ArenaNet, The Creative Assembly, Frictional Games, Frontier Developments, SCS Software, Splash Damage, Square Enix, Cloud Imperium Games and Devolver Digital made appearances. Rising Storm 2: Vietnam, a PC port of Killer Instinct, American Truck Simulator, a Pillars of Eternity expansion known as The White March, Planet Coaster and an expansion of Arma 3 known as Tanoa were announced, and there was footage shown of Killing Floor 2, Star Citizen, Deus Ex: Human Revolution, Total War: Warhammer, Fable Legends, Gigantic, Gears of War: Ultimate Edition, Eve Valkyrie, Ion, Strafe, the Guild Wars 2 expansion Heart of Thorns, Hitman, Soma, Day Z, Take on Mars, BlueStreak, Enter the Gungeon and No Man's Sky.

== List of notable exhibitors ==
This is a list of major video game exhibitors who made appearances at E3 2015.

- 2K Games
- 505 Games
- Alienware
- Activision Blizzard
- Atlus
- Bandai Namco Entertainment
- Bethesda Softworks
- Capcom
- Crytek
- Deep Silver
- Disney Interactive
- Double Fine Productions
- Electronic Arts
- Focus Home Interactive
- Iron Galaxy Studios
- Mattel
- Marvelous USA (Note: Formerly XSEED Games)
- Microsoft Studios
- Natsume Inc.
- Nintendo
- Nvidia
- Oculus VR
- Razer Inc.
- Sony Computer Entertainment
- Square Enix
- Take-Two Interactive
- Team17
- Telltale Games
- Turtle Beach Systems
- Ubisoft
- Warner Bros. Interactive Entertainment
- Wizards of the Coast

== List of featured games ==
This is a list of notable titles that appeared at E3 2015.

13AM Games: Runbow (Wii U); 2K Games: Battleborn (PC / PS4 / Xbox One); Civilization: Beyond Earth – Rising Tide (PC); WWE 2K16 (PS3 / PS4 / Xbox 360 / Xbox One); XCOM 2 (PC); 505 Games: Abzû (PC / PS4); Adrift (PC / PS4 / Xbox One); Assetto Corsa (PS4 / Xbox One); Brothers: A Tale of Two Sons (PS4 / Xbox One); Payday 2: Crimewave Edition (PS4 / Xbox One); Overkill's The Walking Dead (PC / PS4 / Xbox One); Activision Blizzard: Call of Duty: Black Ops III (PC / PS3 / PS4 / Xbox 360 / Xbox One); Destiny: The Taken King (PS3 / PS4 / Xbox 360 / Xbox One); Guitar Hero Live (PS3 / PS4 / Wii U / Xbox 360 / Xbox One); Skylanders: SuperChargers (3DS / iOS / PS3 / PS4 / Wii / Wii U / Xbox 360 / Xbox One); Tony Hawk's Pro Skater 5 (PS3 / PS4 / Xbox 360 / Xbox One); Transformers: Devastation (PC / PS3 / PS4 / Xbox 360 / Xbox One); The Astronauts: The Vanishing of Ethan Carter (PS4); Atlus: Persona 4: Dancing All Night (Vita); Persona 5 (PS3 / PS4); The Deadly Tower of Monsters (PC / PS4); Autumn Games: Skullgirls: 2nd Encore (PS4 / Vita); Bandai Namco Entertainment: Dark Souls III (PC / PS4 / Xbox One); Naruto Shippuden: Ultimate Ninja Storm 4 (PC / PS4 / Xbox One); Project X Zone 2 (3DS); Tales of Zestiria (PC / PS3 / PS4); Bethesda Softworks: BattleCry (PC); Dishonored 2 (PC / PS4 / Xbox One); Dishonored: Definitive Edition (PS4 / Xbox One); Doom (PC / PS4 / Xbox One); Fallout 4 (PC / PS4 / Xbox One); Fallout Shelter (iOS / Android); The Elder Scrolls Online: Tamriel Unlimited (PS4 / Xbox One); The Elder Scrolls: Legends (PC / iOS); Blizzard Entertainment: Heroes of the Storm (PC); Overwatch (PC); StarCraft II: Legacy of the Void (PC); Bohemia Interactive: ARMA 3: Tanoa (PC); Take On Mars (TKOM) (PC); Bossa Studios: I am Bread (PC / PS4); Capcom: Devil May Cry 4: Special Edition (PC / PS4 / Xbox One); Mega Man Legacy Collection (3DS / PC / PS4 / Xbox One); Resident Evil 0 HD Remaster (PC / PS3 / PS4 / Xbox 360 / Xbox One); Street Fighter V (PC / PS4); Capybara Games: Super Time Force Ultra (PS4 / Vita); CI Games: Sniper Ghost Warrior 3 (PC / PS4 / Xbox One); Crytek: Hunt: Horrors of the Gilded Age (PC / PS4 / Xbox One); Robinson: The Journey (PSVR); Daybreak Game Company: PlanetSide 2 (PS4); Deep Silver: Mighty No. 9 (3DS / PC / PS3 / PS4 / Vita / Wii U / Xbox 360 / Xbox One); Devolver Digital: Broforce (PC / PS4 / Vita); Crossing Souls (PC / PS4 / Vita); Eitr (PC / PS4); Enter the Gungeon (PC / PS4); Mother Russia Bleeds (PC / PS4); Ronin (PC / PS4); Shadow Warrior 2 (PC / PS4 / Xbox One); Disney Interactive Studios: Disney Infinity 3.0 (iOS / PC / PS3 / PS4 / Wii U / Xbox 360 / Xbox One); Double Fine Productions: Gang Beasts (PC / PS4 / Vita); Electronic Arts: FIFA 16 (Android / iOS / PC / PS3 / PS4 / Xbox 360 / Xbox One); Madden NFL 16 (PS3 / PS4 / Xbox 360 / Xbox One); Mass Effect: Andromeda (PC / PS4 / Xbox One); Minions Paradise (iOS / Android); Mirror's Edge Catalyst (PC / PS4 / Xbox One); NBA Live 16 (PS4 / Xbox One); Need for Speed (PC / PS4 / Xbox One); NHL 16 (PS4 / Xbox One); Plants vs. Zombies: Garden Warfare 2 (PC / PS4 / Xbox One); Star Wars Battlefront (PC / PS4 / Xbox One); Star Wars: The Old Republic – Knights of the Fallen Empire (PC); Unravel (PC / PS4 / Xbox One)	Focus Home Interactive: Act of Aggression (PC); Battlefleet Gothic: Armada (PC); Blood Bowl 2 (PC / PS4 / Xbox One); Divinity: Original Sin – Enhanced Edition (PC / PS4 / Xbox One); Farming Simulator 15 (PC / PS3 / PS4 / Vita / Xbox 360 / Xbox One); Mordheim: City of the Damned (PC / PS4 / Xbox One); Space Hulk: Deathwing (PC / PS4 / Xbox One); The Technomancer (PC / PS4 / Xbox One); Untitled Deck13 Interactive game (TBA); Vampyr (PC / PS4 / Xbox One); Frictional Games: Soma (PC / PS4); Frontier Developments: Planet Coaster (PC); Harmonix: Amplitude (PS3 / PS4); Rock Band 4 (PS4 / Xbox One); Headup Games: Typoman (Wii U); Hello Games: No Man's Sky (PC / PS4); Image & Form: SteamWorld Heist (3DS); Iron Galaxy Studios: Capsule Force (PS4); Konami: Metal Gear Solid V: The Phantom Pain (PC / PS3 / PS4 / Xbox 360 / Xbox One); Pro Evolution Soccer 2016 (PC / PS3 / PS4 / Xbox 360 / Xbox One); Level-5: Little Battlers Experience (3DS); Microsoft Studios: Ashen (PC / Xbox One); Below (PC / Xbox One); Castle Crashers Remastered (PC / Xbox One); Cuphead (PC / Xbox One); Fable Legends (PC / Xbox One); Forza Motorsport 6 (Xbox One); Gears of War 4 (Xbox One); Gears of War: Ultimate Edition (PC / Xbox One); Gigantic (PC / Xbox One); Halo 5: Guardians (Xbox One); Killer Instinct (PC / Xbox One); Rare Replay (Xbox One); ReCore (PC / Xbox One); Sea of Thieves (PC / Xbox One); n-Space: Sword Coast Legends (PC / PS4 / Xbox One); Natsume Inc.: Brave Tank Hero (3DS / Wii U); Gotcha Racing (3DS); Harvest Moon: Seeds of Memories (iOS / PC / Wii U); Ninja Strike (Wii U); Nintendo: Animal Crossing: Amiibo Festival (Wii U); Animal Crossing: Happy Home Designer (3DS); Bravely Second: End Layer (3DS); Chibi-Robo! Zip Lash (3DS); EarthBound Beginnings (Wii U); Fatal Frame: Maiden of Black Water (Wii U); Fire Emblem Fates (3DS); Hyrule Warriors Legends (3DS); The Legend of Zelda: Tri Force Heroes (3DS); Mario & Luigi: Paper Jam (3DS); Mario & Sonic at the Rio 2016 Olympic Games (3DS / Wii U); Mario Tennis: Ultra Smash (Wii U); Metroid Prime: Federation Force (3DS); Pokémon Super Mystery Dungeon (3DS); Star Fox Zero (Wii U); Super Mario Maker (Wii U); Super Smash Bros. for Nintendo 3DS and Wii U (3DS / Wii U); Tokyo Mirage Sessions ♯FE (Wii U); Xenoblade Chronicles X (Wii U); Yo-kai Watch (3DS); Yoshi's Woolly World (Wii U); Panic: Firewatch (PC / PS4); Paradox Interactive: Hollowpoint (PC / PS4); Pixel Titans: Strafe (PC); Poppermost Productions: Snow (PC / PS4); Psyonix: Rocket League (PC / PS4); Rebellion Developments: Battlezone (PC / PS4); Renegade Kid: Mutant Mudds Super Challenge (3DS / Wii U); Riot Games: League of Legends (PC)	RocketWerkz: Ion (PC / Xbox One); SCS Software: American Truck Simulator (PC); Sega: Total War: Warhammer (PC); Shin'en Multimedia: Fast Racing Neo (Wii U); Ska Studios: Salt and Sanctuary (PC / PS4 / Vita); Sony Computer Entertainment: Alone with You (PS4 / Vita); Calvino Noir (PS4); Drawn to Death (PS4); Dreams (PS4); Fat Princess Adventures (PS4); God of War III Remastered (PS4); Guns Up! (PS3 / PS4 / Vita); Horizon: Zero Dawn (PS4); Journey (PS4); Kill Strain (PS4); N++ (PS4); Ratchet & Clank (PS4); RIGS: Mechanized Combat League (PS4); Shadow of the Beast (PS4); Tearaway Unfolded (PS4); The Last Guardian (PS4); The Tomorrow Children (PS4); Uncharted 4: A Thief's End (PS4); Until Dawn (PS4); Square Enix: Deus Ex: Mankind Divided (PC / PS4 / Xbox One); Dragon Quest Heroes: The World Tree's Woe and the Blight Below (PS4); Final Fantasy VII Remake (PS4); Final Fantasy XIV: Heavensward (PC / PS3 / PS4); Hitman (PC / PS4 / Xbox One); I Am Setsuna (PS4 / Vita); Just Cause 3 (PC / PS4 / Xbox One); Kingdom Hearts III (PS4 / Xbox One); Kingdom Hearts: Unchained χ (Android / iOS); Lara Croft Go (Android / iOS); Life Is Strange (PC / PS3 / PS4 / Xbox 360 / Xbox One); Nier: Automata (PS4); Rise of the Tomb Raider (PC / PS4 / Xbox 360 / Xbox One); Star Ocean: Integrity and Faithlessness (PS3 / PS4); World of Final Fantasy (PS4 / Vita); Team17: Galak-Z: The Dimensional (PC / PS4 / Vita); Telltale Games: The Walking Dead: Michonne (Android / iOS / PC / PS3 / PS4 / Xbox 360 / Xbox One); Tiger & Squid: Beyond Eyes (PC / PS4 / Xbox One); Tripwire Interactive: Rising Storm 2: Vietnam (PC); Ubisoft: Anno 2205 (PC); Assassin's Creed Syndicate (PC / PS4 / Xbox One); The Crew: Wild Run (PC / PS4 / Xbox 360 / Xbox One); For Honor (PC / PS4 / Xbox One); Just Dance 2016 (PS3 / PS4 / Wii / Wii U / Xbox 360 / Xbox One); South Park: The Fractured but Whole (PC / PS4 / Xbox One); Tom Clancy's Ghost Recon Wildlands (PC / PS4 / Xbox One); Tom Clancy's Rainbow Six Siege (PC / PS4 / Xbox One); Tom Clancy's The Division (PC / PS4 / Xbox One); TrackMania Turbo (PC / PS4 / Xbox One); Versus Evil: The Banner Saga (PS4 / Vita); Viva Media: Goliath (PC); Vlambeer: Nuclear Throne (PC / PS3 / PS4 / Vita); Warhorse Studios: Kingdom Come: Deliverance (PC / PS4 / Xbox One); Warner Bros.: Batman: Arkham Knight (PC / PS4 / Xbox One); Lego Marvel's Avengers (3DS / PC / PS3 / PS4 / Vita / Wii U / Xbox 360 / Xbox One); Lego Dimensions (PS3 / PS4 / Wii U / Xbox 360 / Xbox One); Mad Max (PC / PS4 / Xbox One); WayForward Technologies: Shantae: Half-Genie Hero (PC / PS3 / PS4 / Vita / Wii U / Xbox 360 / Xbox One); XSEED Games: Corpse Party: Blood Drive (Vita); Earth Defense Force 2: Invaders from Planet Space (Vita); Earth Defense Force 4.1: The Shadow of New Despair (PS4); The Legend of Heroes: Trails of Cold Steel (PS3 / Vita); Onechanbara Z2: Chaos (PS4); Return to PololoCrois: A Story of Seasons Fairy Tale (3DS); Senran Kagura: Estival Versus (PS4 / Vita); Senran Kagura 2: Deep Crimson (3DS); Nitroplus Blasterz: Heroines Infinite Duel (PS4 / PS3); YS Net: Shenmue III (PC / PS4)
