= List of Oculus Rift games =

Video games marketed by the Oculus VR company are designed for the Oculus Rift and other Oculus virtual reality headsets. Oculus games are platform locked, and unlike other competing platforms Oculus does not provide software serials.

== Natural locomotion ==
Natural locomotion games only use the motion and rotation of the player's head, without apparent camera movement induced by a thumbstick or keyboard.

Games marked * have optional artificial locomotion, where teleportation can be added to natural locomotion.

Title	Genre	Exclusive	Input device(s)	Refs.
Chronos	Adventure RPG	Yes	Gamepad	
Dead Secret	Mystery Thriller	No	Oculus Remote / Gamepad	
Defense Grid 2: Enhanced VR Edition	Tower Defense	Yes	Oculus Remote / Gamepad	
Drunk or Dead	Zombie shooter	No	Oculus Touch	
Gunslinger - Cowboy Shooting Challenge	Action/Simulation	Yes	Oculus Remote	
Hitman Go: VR Edition	Turn-based Strategy	Yes	Oculus Remote / Gamepad	
Keep Talking and Nobody Explodes	Social Puzzle	No	Gamepad	
Pinball FX2 VR	Arcade Game	No	Gamepad	
Please, Don't Touch Anything	Puzzle	No	Oculus Remote / Gamepad	
The Vanishing of Ethan Carter VR	Mystery	No	Gamepad	
Deadly Burrito*	Shooter	Yes	Oculus Touch	
Rec Room* ("teleport" option)	FPS / Action RPG / Sports / Social	No	Oculus Touch	
Derail Valley*	Simulation Video Game, Adventure, Early Access	No	Oculus Touch	

== Cockpit locomotion ==
Cockpit locomotion games use a vehicle with a cockpit to let the players traverse an environment. Whether this causes motion sickness varies based on multiple factors, including: the player's constitution, the size of the cockpit, and the intensity of motion.

Title	Genre	Exclusive	Input device(s)
ADR1FT	Adventure	No	Gamepad
American Truck Simulator	Driving Simulation	No	Gamepad / Steering Wheel
Assetto Corsa	Racing Simulation	No	Steering Wheel
Bazaar	Adventure	No	Gamepad
Digital Combat Simulator World	Flight Simulation	No	Flight Stick / HOTAS / Rudder Pedals / Gamepad / Mouse+Keyboard
DiRT Rally	Racing Simulation	Yes	Steering wheel
Elite Dangerous	Spaceflight Simulation	No	Gamepad / Flight Stick / HOTAS
Euro Truck Simulator 2	Driving Simulation	No	Gamepad / Steering Wheel
EVE: Valkyrie	Space Dogfighter	No	Gamepad / Flight Stick
Flight Simulator X	Flight Simulation	No	Flight Stick / HOTAS / Yoke / Rudder Pedals / Gamepad / Mouse+Keyboard
Gunjack	Turret Shooter	No	Gamepad
IL-2 Sturmovik: Great Battles	Combat Flight Simulation	No	Flight Stick / HOTAS / Rudder Pedals / Gamepad / Mouse+Keyboard
iRacing	Racing Simulation	Yes	Steering Wheel
Live for Speed	Racing Simulation	No	Steering Wheel
Prepar3D	Flight Simulation	No	Flight Stick / HOTAS / Yoke / Rudder Pedals / Gamepad / Mouse+Keyboard
Project CARS - Game of the Year Edition	Racing Simulation	No	Gamepad / Steering Wheel
RaceRoom Racing Experience	Racing Simulation	No	Gamepad / Steering Wheel
Radial-G: Racing Revolved	Arcade Racer	No	Gamepad / Mouse+Keyboard / Steering Wheel
VR Regatta	Sailing simulation	No	Oculus Touch
War Thunder	Flight Simulation	No	Keyboard+Mouse/Gamepad/HOTAS or Flightstick

== Artificial locomotion ==
These games artificially move the "camera", such as thumbstick player movement or on rails camera movement. They can allow for a wider range of experiences, but can cause motion sickness and can be detrimental to presence.

Title	Genre	Exclusive	Input device(s)
Edge of Nowhere	Action-Adventure Horror	Yes	Gamepad
Emily Wants to Play	Horror	No	Gamepad / Mouse+Keyboard
Fallout 4 VR Edition	Science Fiction	No	Oculus Touch / Gamepad / Mouse+Keyboard
Into the Dead	Survival FPS	No	Gamepad
Kumoon (with DLC)	Puzzle	No	Gamepad
Legend of Dungeon	Action RPG	No	Gamepad
Lucky's Tale	Platformer	Yes	Gamepad
Minecraft	Adventure / Sandbox	No	Gamepad
Obduction	Adventure / Puzzle	No	Oculus Remote / Oculus Touch / Gamepad / Mouse+Keyboard
P·O·L·L·E·N	Exploration	No	Gamepad
Quake (With Mod)	FPS	No	Gamepad / Mouse+Keyboard
Rec Room ("walking" option)	FPS / Action RPG / Sports / Social	No	Oculus Touch
Roblox	Sandbox	No	Mouse+Keyboard / Gamepad / Oculus Touch
Subnautica	Adventure	No	Gamepad
The Climb	Exploration	Yes	Oculus Touch / Gamepad
The Solus Project	Exploration Adventure	No	Gamepad / Mouse+Keyboard
The Town of Light	Horror	No	Gamepad
Stormland	Science Fiction	Yes	Oculus Touch

== Titles in development ==
These games have been announced and are at the moment in development.

Title	Genre	Exclusive	Input device(s)	Est. release date
Hyperstacks	Puzzle Platformer	No	Oculus Touch	April 2021
Facebook Horizon	Sandbox	Yes	Oculus Touch	2021

== See also ==
- List of Oculus Quest games
- List of HTC Vive games
- List of PlayStation VR games
