= SJSM =

SJSM may refer to:

- Saint James School of Medicine, private for-profit medical school in Anguilla and Saint Vincent and the Grenadines
- Sisters of Saint Joseph of Saint-Marc, Roman Catholic congregation of religious sisters
- Spooky's Jump Scare Mansion, a 2014 survival horror game
