= Eve: Valkyrie =

2016 shooter game

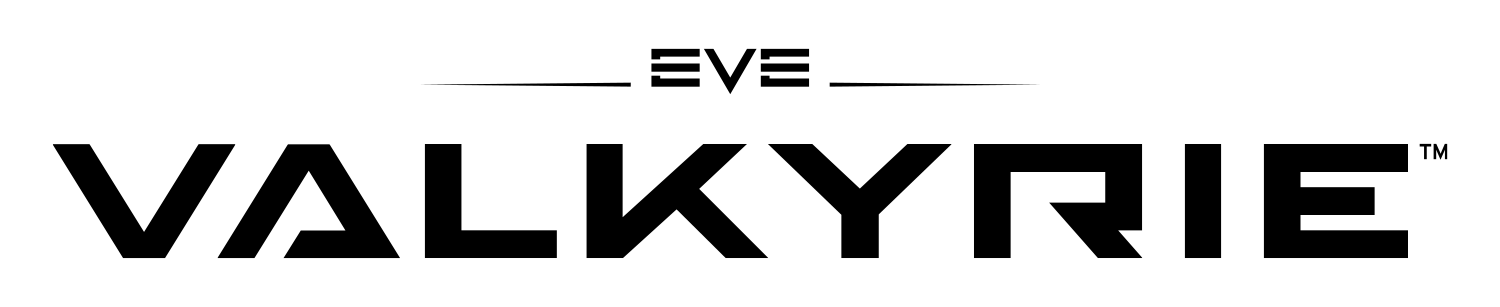
- Developer: CCP Games
- Publishers: CCP Games; Oculus VR
- Producer: Owen O'Brien
- Series: Eve Online
- Engine: Unreal Engine 4
- Platforms: Microsoft Windows; PlayStation 4
- Release: Microsoft Windows; 28 March 2016; PlayStation 4; 13 October 2016
- Genres: Vehicular combat; first-person shooter
- Mode: Multiplayer

Eve: Valkyrie was a multiplayer dogfighting shooter game set in the Eve Online universe that was designed to use virtual reality headset technology. Originally launched for Microsoft Windows for use with the Oculus Rift virtual reality headset, CCP Games had announced they plan to enable cross-platform play between the three major VR systems: the Oculus Rift, the HTC Vive, and the PlayStation VR. Released in March 2016, the game had two game mode options: Chronicles could be played in single player, while Combat allowed eight by eight combat PvP (player versus player) missions. Reviews generally criticized the limited plot and limitations of single player mode, although the described "arcade experience" was praised for having intuitive controls and "exhilarating" dogfighting features, with PC Powerplay dubbing it "arguably the best VR experience currently available for the [Oculus Rift] platform."

== Plot and gameplay ==
In Eve: Valkyrie, players assumed the identity of a cloned ace pilot, with the pilot ostensibly remembering previous deaths and failures. One of the central characters of the plot, Rán Kavik, is voiced by Katee Sackhoff.

The game allowed single-player mode for the tutorials and several "exploratory" levels, although as of September 2016, the game was primarily focused on PvP (player versus player) dogfighting matches. After the opening missions, Valkyrie splits into two game mode options: Chronicles could be played in single player, while Combat allowed eight by eight combat PvP missions.

In June 2016, a "trench" fighter pilot feature was added as part of a free patch with new gameplay. The new Carrier Assault game mode with the update featured three gameplay stages, the final of which features a "Star-Wars-like trench run" into the center of a ship. Among other changes with the patch were "Boost Gates" that increase speed when flown through, a new "Crossroads multiplayer map", new game modes, and a new bonus feature awarded to each player at the end of matches. The main menu was also revised, with an additional new "tactical" menu added showing all actives players and their stats during multiplayer matches. As of September 2016, the game was only available to players with the Oculus Rift headset through PC, and players with the PSVR headset, on PlayStation, although CCP has announced the game will allow cross-platform play with other upcoming systems.

== Development ==
During development, it was called EVE-VR while still a tech demo. Eve: Valkyrie was initially a demo put together by several CCP developers as a side project in their free time, with the demo then shown at EVE Fanfest in late April 2013. While the game was undergoing early development in October 2013, CCP asserted they were "thinking about" adding a single-player campaign to EVE: Valkyrie. At the time, the demo was only multiplayer and focused largely on dogfighting.

While the game console or operating system for the game was initially left unannounced, in February 2014 CCP announced that Eve: Valkyrie was being developed for exclusive use on Microsoft Windows with the then unreleased Oculus Rift virtual reality headset.

In May 2014, CCP announced that the game would utilize the Unreal Engine 4, moving on from the Unity engine. The source code for the original demo, according to developers, had been entirely rewritten by a team of 24 to work with the new engine. By that time, it had also been announced that beyond Windows PC, the game would also be compatible with Sony's Project Morpheus (now titled PlayStation VR) on the PlayStation 4, with the game to be ready by the start of 2015, but the launch date held off to coincide with the retail version of the Oculus Rift.

On March 19, 2015, CCP announced that Eve: Valkyrie had been opened for its pre-alpha testing phase, which was invite-only to players. At the time, CCP also confirmed that game would be a launch title for both Oculus Rift and PlayStation VR, with no firm release dates set for either version. The versions were confirmed to be similar, but would not allow cross-platform play for players using different hardware.

== Release ==
Eve: Valkyrie was launched for Microsoft Windows on March 28, 2016, serving as a launch title for Facebook's Oculus Rift virtual reality headset, with the game coming bundled with every pre-order of the device. On April 5, 2016 CCP Games announced that the game will get support for the HTC Vive in 2016. In March 2014, CCP announced they plan to enable cross-platform play between the three major VR systems: the Oculus Rift, the HTC Vive, and the PlayStation VR, with the latter two versions unreleased at the time. A version for Sony's PlayStation VR was expected to launch in October 2016, with the date set for October 13. As of September 2016, the game was shipped for free with every version of the Rift Consumer Version 1 kit for Oculus Rift.

On September 26, 2017, CCP released Eve: Valkyrie - Warzone on PC and PlayStation 4, removing the VR requirement and allowing for cross-platform multiplayer.

In October 2017, CCP ceased all VR development for Eve: Valkyrie and other VR projects.

As of August 5, 2022, CCP officially turned off all servers for the game making the game unplayable.

In September 2026, Fans brought the game back with a community hosted solution that brought back almost full functionality to the PC version.

== Reception ==
Reception

Aggregate score
| Aggregator | Score |
|---|---|
| Metacritic | (PS4) 72/100 (PC) 69/100 |

Review scores
| Publication | Score |
|---|---|
| Computer and Video Games | 8/10 |
| Game Informer | 6.25/10 |
| PC Gamer (US) | 60/100 |
| PC Powerplay | 7/10 |
| Gamer.nl | 6.5/10 |

Eve: Valkyrie received "mixed or average" reviews, according to review aggregator Metacritic. The game received a mixed to positive review in PC Powerplay as "easily one of the prettiest VR launch titles," and "arguably the best VR experience currently available for the [Oculus Rift] platform." Despite praising the VR experience and initial several hours of play, however, the reviewer wrote that the game is "also a prime example of how we're still at the very first generation of VR games - take away the VR headset, and there's actually a remarkably shallow experience here."

It also received a mixed review in PC Gamer, with Matthew Gilman writing that the "arcade experience" is "proper gasp-out-loud stuff, seeing enemy ships zoom past and being able to follow them with real life head turns as they go. The most immediately arresting, and perhaps surprising thing about all this... is just how intuitive it all is." Gilman went on to call the dogfighting features "intensely satisfying," and "the sort of videogame joy that's immediate and clear." Gilman criticized elements of the plot and gameplay, however, expressing frustration with the time required to upgrade ships and the repetition of both single player and multi-player levels, arguing that with "multiplayer you play through those same maps endlessly, as part of an eight strong team. With no narrative to hold things back, and with combat boiling down to spectacle over legitimate tactical warfare, things get old fast."

It was reviewed in Game Informer, with Matt Bertz writing that "the visceral experience of sitting in this futuristic cockpit is the biggest selling point... the potential for a defining VR experience is here, which is why the extreme lack of compelling content is such a shame." It was also reviewed in CG Magazine, which praised the controls and the ability to look and see enemy ships, writing "the controls are tight and feel great and easy to pick up, especially in comparison to something more sim oriented like fellow space game Elite: Dangerous." The review dubbed the plot "interesting" but "quite shallow," although argued the dogfighting was "exhilarating" and "I haven't found a more satisfying multiplayer experience yet in virtual reality." The review did note a lack of players to fill up multi-player matches as of September 2016, with the reviewer projecting that numbers would increase over time. The Dutch review site Gamer.nl also praised the visuals and visceral feel of flying in VR, particularly in multiplayer mode and in the tutorials. However, the review criticized repetition and limitations in single player mode, as well as certain technical aspects of the gameplay.

== See also ==
- List of games with Oculus Rift support
- List of HTC Vive games
- List of space flight simulation games
- List of PlayStation 4 games
- List of PlayStation VR games
- 2016 in video gaming
