= Megaton Rainfall =

2017 video game

- Developer: Pentadimensional Games
- Platforms: PlayStation 4 Microsoft Windows; Nintendo Switch; Xbox One
- Release: PlayStation 4: WW: October 17, 2017; Microsoft Windows: WW: November 17, 2017; Nintendo Switch, Xbox One: WW: August 9, 2018
- Genre: Action
- Mode: Single-player

Megaton Rainfall is an action video game developed by Pentadimensional Games for PlayStation 4 and Microsoft Windows. It was released on October 17, 2017, for PlayStation 4 as a timed exclusive and later on November 17, 2017, for Microsoft Windows. It was released on the Nintendo Switch and Xbox One on August 9, 2018. It is also compatible with Sony's virtual reality headset, PlayStation VR, and was made compatible with the Oculus Rift and HTC Vive on August 9, 2018.

== Plot ==
The plot revolves around an intergalactic superbeing that has been entrusted by its creator with the responsibility of protecting planet Earth from an imminent alien invasion.

== Gameplay ==
Megaton Rainfall is an action game set in an open universe environment and played from a first person perspective. It can be played normally, and it can also be played using certain virtual reality headsets. The player must protect human cities from hordes of attacking aliens while avoiding collateral damage, and while the game's singular protagonist cannot die from alien attacks, entire cities can be destroyed. The player has the ability to fly at supersonic speed and even outside the atmosphere, and can reach mach 8 in 5 seconds. Earth is represented in full scale within the game, and although not every city is represented, it is possible to fly from the bottom of the Atlantic Ocean, outside of Earth's atmosphere, and eventually to leave the Milky Way Galaxy. The player is able to travel to other planets as well.

The game features fully destructible environments, and items such as buildings are procedurally generated and destructible, and the player can use several attacks to destroy environments such as surrounding buildings and enemy spaceships. The enemies have their weak spots marked by red lights. and according to the developer, he invented a new system for the realistic rendering of explosions. This allows for increased realism in the damage to buildings and other objects.

== Development ==
Megaton Rainfall was developed by Pentadimensional Games, a video game developer for virtual reality games. It is an indie studio formed by Alfonso del Cerro in Madrid, Spain in February 2015. The company both publishes and develops, and the game came out on October 26, 2017. The game was in development by one man, Alfonso del Cerro, for over five years. He had started the game in January 2012 in his spare time off from a Spanish games company.

The game was self-published. It was initially slated for a release on September 26, 2017, for PlayStation 4 and PlayStation VR and at a later date on Steam. The release date of PlayStation 4 and PlayStation VR version was delayed on September 26, 2017, to three weeks later, October 17, 2017.

== Reception ==
Reception

Aggregate score
Aggregator	Score
Metacritic	(PS4) 72/100 (XBO) 64/100 (NS) 63/100

Review scores
Publication	Score
GameSpot	7/10
Hardcore Gamer	3.5/5
Nintendo Life	6/10
Push Square	5/10

Megaton Rainfall received "mixed or average" reviews from critics, according to review aggregator Metacritic. GameSpot gave it a score of 7 out of 10 and said much of it was "the stuff of childhood dreams", despite some spots that were "rough around the edges", and that "the exhilaration of flight, the feeling of power, and, perhaps most importantly, the sense of personal responsibility for the planet, has never been captured quite like this before." PlayStation Universe called it "one of the most stylish and enthralling games on PSVR." Nintendo Life and Push Square gave the game six and five stars, respectively, concluding that it was "an indie hit that wows with its sheer scale and the breadth of its ambition...this superhero simulator struggles to maintain the impressive impact of its first hour, or live up to the lofty heights of those dangerously high ambitions."

=== Accolades ===
The game was featured at the 2015 Independent Game Festival in California and at Gamescom in Germany in 2017. Megaton Rainfall won the award for "Best Action Game" at Intel Level Up 2017.

== See also ==
- List of PlayStation VR games
- List of PlayStation 4 games (M-Z)
