= Table of Tales: The Crooked Crown =

- Developer(s): Tin Man Games
- Publisher(s): Tin Man Games
- Platform(s): PlayStation 4; Windows; Nintendo Switch
- Release: PS4; NA: April 16, 2019; EU: April 16, 2019; Win; NA: September 15, 2021; EU: September 15, 2021; Switch; NA: July 14, 2022; EU: July 14, 2022
- Genre(s): Digital tabletop
- Mode(s): Single-player

Table of Tales: The Crooked Crown is a digital tabletop game developed and published by Tin Man Games. It was initially released as a virtual reality game for PlayStation VR, but it was later ported to Windows, which optionally uses VR, and Switch, which does not. It simulates tabletop role-playing board games.

== Gameplay ==
Players control characters on a digital tabletop that simulates role-playing board games. A mechanical bird narrates players' adventures, and they can make choices that change the plot. Some of these choices necessitate dice rolls, which are rolled on the tabletop, to see if players succeed. Failing die rolls does not result in a game over; instead, the game continues through a different path, though some combats may be more difficult. Combat is turn-based and uses action points.

== Development ==
Developer Tin Man Games is based in Melbourne, Australia. It released the game for PlayStation VR on April 16, 2019; Windows on September 15, 2021; and Switch on July 14, 2022.

== Reception ==
UploadVR called it "flawed yet unique". They praised its replayability and the premise of playing a digital tabletop RPG, but they found the combat a bit simplistic and the humor to be kid-friendly and toothless. They recommended it to those looking for "entertainment over challenge". Digitally Downloaded said it is "eminently replayable" and praised its emulation of tabletop role-playing, which they said was elegantly simplified to work in VR. Push Square praised the story, gameplay, and replayability. TouchArcade praised the Switch port, which they said was still a cozy and fun game despite the lack of VR. Pocket Gamer included it their list of best Switch games and said it does an "amazing job" simulating tabletop RPGs.

Table of Tales was a finalist in the “Excellence in Narrative” category at the 2019 Freeplay Awards, and won the ”Excellence in AR/VR" award at the 2022 Australian Game Developer Awards.
