= Drunk or Dead =

2017 first-person shooter video game for mobiles

- Developer: 4 I Lab
- Publisher: 4 I Lab
- Engine: Unity
- Platforms: HTC Vive, Oculus Rift
- Release: PC 10 January 2017
- Genre: First-person shooter
- Mode: Single-player

Drunk or Dead is a first-person shooter video game for virtual reality by 4 I Lab. Initially released in January, 2017.

== Plot ==
The game takes place during apocalypse caused by a virus that turns all sober people into zombies. The virus has only one weakness — it is unstable toward alcohol and infects only those organisms which have no blood alcohol content.

The player starts in a room that keeps a great amount of different of alcoholic beverages and weapons — a Wild West bar.

== Gameplay ==
The game's main objective is to keep the levels of alcohol in the player character's system as high as possible without getting poisoned. Any bite received from a zombie lowers the amount of alcohol in their system. The higher the levels of alcohol, the more health points the player has, but drinking too much will add a woozy effect and make the character sway around. The lower the amount of alcohol, the less health points, however, the player see more clearly, thus making it easier to aim.

== Development ==
The game was created in 36 hours, during a Christmas non-stop hackathon by 4 I Lab studio. The game was published on Steam on January 10, 2017, with HTC Vive support. On April 5, 2017, support for the Oculus Rift and Touch controllers was added.

== Reception ==
The game was positively reviewed by Rock, Paper, Shotgun, UploadVR and Pocket Gamer.
