= List of PlayStation 4 games =

This is a list of games that were released for the PlayStation 4 console.

There are currently 3606 games across both lists.

== See also ==
- List of best-selling PlayStation 4 video games
- List of PlayStation 4 free-to-play games
- List of PlayStation VR games
