= TrackMania Turbo (2016 video game) =

2016 racing video game

- Developer: Ubisoft Nadeo
- Publisher: Ubisoft
- Director: Florent Castelnérac
- Designer: Francois Alaux
- Series: TrackMania
- Engine: Maniaplanet
- Platforms: Microsoft Windows; PlayStation 4; Xbox One
- Release: PlayStation 4 & Xbox One: NA: 22 March 2016; PAL: 24 March 2016; Microsoft Windows: WW: 24 March 2016
- Genre: Racing
- Modes: Single-player, multiplayer

TrackMania Turbo is a racing video game developed by Ubisoft Nadeo and published by Ubisoft. Announced at E3 2015, the title is the first TrackMania game released on consoles since 2009's TrackMania: Build to Race on the Wii. The game features support for virtual reality. The game was originally set to be released on 3 November 2015, but was delayed to 22 March 2016 to give additional time to the development team to further polish the game.

== Gameplay ==
TrackMania: Turbo features gameplay akin to that of previous games in the series. The player can race on over 200 tracks across four locations, namely Canyon Grand Drift, Valley Down and Dirty, Rollercoaster Lagoon and International Stadium. Similar to previous games, the game moves at a very high pace with a high focus on stunts. The game's developer stated that "[They] wanted [Trackmania Turbo] to be an arcade game"

Various modes appear in the game, including a single-player campaign and a mode called Double Driver, which is a cooperative multiplayer mode where two players control the same car. TrackMania Turbo also has a split screen multiplayer mode for up to 4 players which makes it the first racing game with such gameplay for the consoles PlayStation 4 and Xbox One and PC in 2016.

The track editor from previous games also returns, which allows players to create their own tracks and share them with other players. A new addition to the track editor is its ability to generate random tracks. A new feature introduced to the franchise is Systemic music. It ties the soundscape to the gameplay, dynamically intensifying, heightening or lessening the music to fit with the gameplay.

== Reception ==
Reception

Aggregate score
Aggregator	Score
Metacritic	(PC) 79/100 (PS4) 81/100 (XONE) 76/100

Review scores
Publication	Score
Destructoid	8.5/10
Electronic Gaming Monthly	7/10
Game Informer	7.5/10
GameRevolution	4/5
GameSpot	7/10
VideoGamer.com	8/10

TrackMania Turbo received "generally favorable" reviews, according to video game review aggregator website Metacritic.
