= Beyond Eyes =

2015 video game

- Developers: Tiger & Squid
- Publisher: Team17
- Producer: Christie Hanson
- Designers: Karl Morley; Adam Findlay; Matt Burnill
- Programmer: Dave Smethurst
- Artist: Nick Gomersall
- Writer: Sherida Halatoe
- Engine: Unity
- Platforms: Linux, Windows, OS X, PlayStation 4, Xbox One
- Release: Xbox One; August 4, 2015; Windows, OS X, Linux; August 11, 2015; PlayStation 4; September 8, 2015
- Genre: Adventure
- Mode: Single-player

Beyond Eyes is an adventure game developed by Tiger & Squid and published by Team17.

== Gameplay ==
The game showcases how a ten-year-old girl named Rae, who has lost her sight due to an accident with fireworks, interacts with the world around her. The world initially appears to be all white, but certain objects are highlighted when Rae touches them. Sound is an important element of the game, giving the player an idea of where certain objects are located. Challenges include deciding if the sound of cars is distant enough to safely cross the road. Beyond Eyes fits into a genre of walking simulator video games that tell a story, and much like a blind person must memorise their environment, the game tries to show how sound memory for a blind person feels.

== Development ==
The game was developed by Sherida Halatoe's Tiger & Squid in collaboration with Team17. It was shown to the international press for the first time at the annual Game Developers Conference 2015. It failed to reach its crowdfunding goal on Indiegogo. Tiger & Squid are believed to be, a real cat also portrayed in the game, and a stuffed toy.

== Reception ==
Reception

Aggregate scores
Aggregator	Score
GameRankings	(PC) 65.17% (XONE) 63.19% (PS4) 59.29%
Metacritic	(PC) 60/100 (XONE) 60/100 (PS4) 52/100

Review scores
Publication	Score
Destructoid	4/10
GameRevolution	3.5/5
IGN	5.5/10
PC Gamer (US)	75/100
VideoGamer.com	5/10

Beyond Eyes received mixed reviews. Aggregating review websites GameRankings and Metacritic gave the Microsoft Windows version 65.17% based on 6 reviews and 60/100 based on 11 reviews, the Xbox One version 63.19% based on 16 reviews and 60/100 based on 24 reviews and the PlayStation 4 version 59.29% based on 7 reviews and 52/100 based on 7 reviews.
