= Everest VR =

2016 virtual reality experience

- Developer: Solfar
- Publisher: Solfar
- Release: 2016
- Genre: Virtual reality
- Mode: Single-player

Everest VR is an interactive media experience/film that simulates in virtual reality the ascent to the summit of Mount Everest.

== Content ==
Everest VR is a virtual reality experience about two hours in length with no gameplay elements. The experience begins with a narration about Mount Everest and its dangerous Khumbu Icefall. The player crosses a metal ladder to cross a deep crevasse and proceeds up the mountain. Several detours quicken the player's ascension.

== Development ==
The Icelandic virtual reality content company Solfar developed Everest VR as one of two VR experiences for release in 2016. They constructed their virtual Everest using stereophotogrammetry, which used supercomputers to combine photographs taken from a variety of angles to generate a color, three-dimensional image in high resolution. The Icelandic special effects company Reykjavik Visual Effects (RVX) partnered with Solfar to complete it.
