= Strafe (video game) =

2017 video game

- Developer: Pixel Titans
- Publisher: Devolver Digital
- Composer: ToyTree
- Engine: Unity
- Platforms: Microsoft Windows, OS X, PlayStation 4, Linux
- Release: May 9, 2017; Linux; March 27, 2018
- Genre: First-person shooter
- Mode: Single-player

Strafe (stylized as STRAFE) is a first-person shooter video game developed by Pixel Titans and published by Devolver Digital. The game is a homage to 1990s first-person shooter video games, such as Doom and Quake, advertised as to have "bleeding edge graphics and gameplay", citing the year 1996. It was released worldwide on May 9, 2017.

== Gameplay ==
Strafe is a first-person shooter with roguelike elements. There are four stages containing two or three levels each (depending on the game mode), all of which are semi-procedurally generated. Upon loading into each zone, the map is generated by pulling a set of rooms from a pool and arranging them randomly. The enemies, upgrades, and merchants among other assets are also randomized and placed in the zone. Upon death, upgrades will be lost and levels will be rearranged once more, but the player may be able to access teleporters to unlocked stages from the hub spacecraft. The fourth stage features an additional boss level that is not procedurally generated.

From the hub spacecraft, the player picks a primary weapon at the beginning of each run from a shotgun, a machine gun or a railgun. Each weapon has a primary and secondary fire method, with power-up items allowing the weapon to become much more powerful. A variety of weapons can be picked up within the levels when dropped from enemies, which generally have limited ammo and can be thrown when empty for additional damage. Merchants appear, from whom the player can buy upgrades.

The game features a dynamic blood splatter system. Environmental effects such as acid and fire appearing from enemies or destruction of objects are a further obstacle and adds gameplay depth, where damaging pools of acid can be nullified by covered it in the blood of enemies. Enemies range from zombies, to robots and aliens.

The player is rewarded for playing the campaign with tokens that can be used to unlock 25 "modifiers" which can be activated at the start of a run to significantly alter the gameplay. For example, by replacing all weapons with rocket launchers, or by scrambling the placement of enemy types outside their usual stages. In addition to the main campaign, there are alternate game modes: Murder Zone (survival mode), Strafe Zone (daily skill challenge), and Speed Zone (weekly speed challenge).

== Plot ==
The unnamed player character is a "scrapper", a space explorer who collects materials to use as currency. An unknown party sends them on a scavenging mission to a ship called Icarus on the far reaches of the known universe. However, once the player arrives on Icarus, they find that something on-board has gone wrong, and must combat a deadly alien threat.

== Development ==
The game had a successful crowdfunding campaign, reaching $207,000 of a $185,000 goal on Kickstarter. The Kickstarter campaign video parodies over-the-top video game commercials of the 1990s. The video was well-received, the game's designer Thom Glunt attributes his experience in commercial and video production to its success. Though the video was humorous, Glunt stresses that Strafe is not a comedy game, but "balls-to-the-wall straight-up" action game. Strafe was featured at the 2015 Games Developers Conference with a playable demo.

Strafe development continued after the official release with several major updates. The Millennium Edition was released on October 2, 2017, and added mutators, challenge modes, the ability to save runs, and additional campaign content. The Gold Edition was released on May 9, 2020, and added a New Game Plus mode, as well as a long list of bug fixes, balance tweaks, and optimizations.

== Reception ==
Reception

Aggregate score
Aggregator	Score
Metacritic	64/100

Review scores
Publication	Score
Destructoid	8.5/10
GameSpot	8/10

Strafe received "mixed or average" reviews from critics, according to review aggregator platform Metacritic.

GameSpot awarded Strafe a score of 8 out of 10, and called it "fun", "intense", and "fast-paced" shooter with "distinguishable" charm.
