= Radial-G: Racing Revolved =

2016 video game

- Logo of Radial-G: Racing Revolved
- Developer: Tammeka Games
- Publisher: Tammeka Games
- Producer: Sam Watts
- Designer: Geoff Cullen
- Programmers: David Lyne, Nicola Birtwistle, Josh Jeffries
- Artists: Michalis Mavronas, Gavriil Mavronas, Iain Douglas
- Engine: Unity
- Platforms: Oculus Rift, HTC Vive, PlayStation 4, PlayStation VR, Samsung Gear VR, Google Daydream, Razer OSVR
- Genre: Racing
- Modes: Single-player, multiplayer

Radial-G: Racing Revolved is an indie racing game, which was developed by Tammeka Games and was released on March 28, 2016, for the Oculus Rift. HTC Vive and Razer OSVR support via the Steam version was released April 5, 2016 and is going to be released on Sony PlayStation VR on September 12, 2017 for EU regions with U.S. dates to be announced.

== Gameplay ==
Radial-G is a game where the player races a spaceship around a futuristic race track, It has single-player and multi-player modes. There are nine different tracks, which are all of a tubular design, and include open twisty sections, tunnel sections, inverted sections and jumps. There are seven different spaceships which can be unlocked by playing the single and multi-player versions of the game. The single-player mode allows racing against up to fifteen A.I. controlled opponents. The Multi-player mode enables up to a sixteen players to race against each other. The racing mainly revolves around the player attempting to align their spaceship with the green gates which give the spaceship a large speed boost. The player must avoid red gates as these greatly slow down the ship. There are twenty background music tracks which are played throughout the game.

In September after a patch release, a combat mode was added. This gives players five different weapons they can use to get an advantage over their opponents.

The game can be played using a Virtual reality headset where the player takes the view of the ships pilot and controls the steering and speed of the ship using the hand controllers. The player is able to look around the cockpit and the racetrack by moving their head. There is also a third-person camera view; however, this is only supported on a monitor and not through a VR headset.

The game is available through steam, Oculus Home and will be available for Sony PlayStation VR on September 12 (EU digital store release), September 15 (physical boxed edition) and later on in September for US PlayStation Store. At the end of August on the 24th, the Daydream (Google) version released globally, offering a slimmed down version of the PC VR racer against 4 AI only. The main game has support for Steam/Oculus achievements, stats and leaderboards.

== Development ==
Between 3 July and 2 August 2014, Tammeka Games had put everything into trying to raise funds through Kickstarter for the game but unfortunately despite support from the VR community, the campaign fell short.

Radial-G was first released through an early access launch 11 December 2014 and throughout 2015 there were various additions to the game with the first full version being released on March 28, 2016. Oculus Rift DK1 and DK2 was supported from the first early access release. The third-person camera view, for non-VR users, and two new tracks were added on 2 March 2015. On 2 April 2015, two new race tracks were added along with support for three levels of ship speed class, and steam leaderboards, stats and achievements. On 8 April 2015, the quick race and lap attack features were added. Single-player mode was implemented on 14 July 2015. The game officially released on 28 March 2016 as a Day One Launch Title for Oculus Rift. HTC Vive, Steam VR, Open VR and Razer OSVR support was added on 5 April 2016. The twenty official twenty music tracks were released on 30 July 2016. Combat gameplay modes as well as three new ships and additional OSVR support were added on 23 September 2016.

== Reception ==
The early release version of the game had a good reception from the following magazines:

• "Radial-G is fast and fun, and in VR it's standing tall amongst many hopefuls that simply can't match it's [sic] visual clout."– VR Focus

• "It's shaping up to be the de-facto racing game for the Oculus Rift." – Rift Arcade

• "Radial-G is fast, beautiful and shows mastery of virtual reality design" – Polygon

The demo version of the game also had a good reception. Virtual Reality reviewer rated the game as 3.5/5 and the Riftarcade rated the game as 4.5/5.
