= Dead Secret =

2015 video game

- Developer: Robot Invader
- Producer: Casey Richardson
- Designers: Chris Pruett; Johnny Russell
- Programmer: Chris Pruett
- Artist: Mike Witt
- Composer: Ben Prunty
- Platforms: PlayStation 4, PlayStation VR, Microsoft Windows, Mac OS, Oculus VR, Samsung Gear VR, HTC Vive
- Release: Samsung Gear VR: WW: 29 October 2015; Oculus Rift, Steam: WW: 28 March 2016; HTC Vive: WW: 18 August 2016; PlayStation 4, PlayStation VR: WW: 24 April 2018
- Genre: Horror mystery
- Mode: Single-player

Dead Secret is a first-person horror mystery game. It was created by Robot Invader and released on 29 October 2015. The game is set in 1965. The story line revolves around the murder of Harris Bullard.

== Gameplay ==
Dead Secret is set in a secluded farmhouse in Kansas, which is a two-story home with two bedrooms, one bathroom and a basement. This makes for a dense and cramped environment, where initially many rooms are locked. A recursive unlocking map design is used where the player starts in one room and unlocks more rooms and routes between different areas of the map. The player takes the role of a reporter looking for the next big news article. A man, Harris Bullard, dies in suspicious circumstances so the reporter decides to investigate. The player goes to the secluded farmhouse with the suspicion that Harris was murdered. Harris was a scholar of Japanese Mythology who had many secrets which he took to the grave. The player must unravel Harris's secrets and the mystery of his death, and all this must be done before the killer decides to kill again.

The game is a story driven murder mystery focused on investigation and exploration. Because of this there are many clues placed around the farmhouse which the player must find and many of them are puzzles which need deciphering. The plot is very complicated, so it is important to track down all the notes and clues to get to the correct ending. There are five endings to the story many of which end with the player themselves being murdered. The game is first-person, with the player navigating via a point and click system. Throughout the story the player is stalked by a mysterious figure wearing robes and a mask, however there is no combat within the game so when someone attacks you the only thing to do is run and hide. But in general, the game is more about slow realization than jump scares. The total gameplay time is six to eight hours.

== Development ==
The game is developed by Robot Invader, a video game studio in Silicon Valley. It is built upon the Unity 5 game engine. Dead Secret started off as a tablet and mobile game and then was developed into a virtual reality game. There were a lot of different design decisions to be made around this particularly around movement. Movement in VR can often cause motion and simulation sickness. To prevent this, Robot Invader came up with some rules for movement within their game which include linear movement only, no acceleration during movement, no rotating the camera, only move in straight lines, motion should be short, frame rate should be kept constant.

The first VR version of the game was released on 29 October 2015 for the Samsung Gear VR. Oculus Rift and Steam versions were released on 28 March 2016. An update was released on 18 August 2016 which added support for the HTC Vive. The game was released for the PS4 and PS VR on 24 April 2018.

== Reception ==
Jayisgames gave the game 3.9/5. XGN gave the game 8/10. VR Focus gave the game a 5-star rating. VR Giant gave it a score of 8.5/10. Gear VR news gave the game a score of 8.5/10. Trusted Reviews gave the game 22/25.

== Legacy ==
A follow-up called Dead Secret Circle was released on May 1, 2018, on Steam, Oculus Rift, Oculus Go and Gear VR.
