= Spooky's Jump Scare Mansion =

- Developers: Lag Studios; Albino Moose Games (HD Renovation)
- Publishers: Lag Studios; Albino Moose Games (HD Renovation)
- Engine: GameMaker; Unity (HD Renovation)
- Platforms: Original; Windows; HD Renovation; Windows; PlayStation 4; Xbox One; Nintendo Switch
- Release: Original; WW: October 24, 2014; HD Renovation; Windows; WW: March 1, 2017; PlayStation 4; WW: October 29, 2019; Nintendo Switch; WW: October 13, 2022; Xbox One; WW: October 25, 2023
- Genres: Survival horror, adventure
- Mode: Single-player

Spooky's Jump Scare Mansion is a 2014 horror-adventure video game developed and published by Lag Studios. The player's objective is to traverse to the end of a mansion comprising a thousand rooms. Originally titled Spooky's House of Jump Scares, the game's title was changed to Spooky's Jump Scare Mansion in 2016 due to a trademark dispute. The game received an HD remake in 2017, which was released for PlayStation 4 in 2019, Nintendo Switch in 2022, and Xbox One in 2023.

== Gameplay ==
Gameplay screenshot.

Spooky's Jump Scare Mansion is a first-person survival horror game in which the player is tasked with traversing through a mansion comprising 1,000 rooms. As the game progresses, the player encounters enemies referred to as "specimens".

== Plot ==
For as long as the unnamed and unseen protagonist can remember, legends have been told about a derelict mansion in their hometown. The history of the house itself is virtually unknown, and even the town's oldest residents cannot remember the mansion's origin. Being an avid history enthusiast, the protagonist goes to explore the mansion. Inside, they encounter a young ghost girl named Spooky.

Spooky informs the protagonist that the only way to escape is to pass through the mansion's randomly generated 1,000 rooms (although she wonders out loud if there are possibly more rooms than that). Rooms are filled with varying jump scares. While the first 50 rooms appear nonthreatening, a series of discoverable letters left by a former researcher indicate a more sinister plot. After room 50, the rooms begin to take a much darker tone, with hostile entities appearing and the cute facade disappearing.

== Development and release ==
Spooky's Jump Scare Mansion was developed by North Carolina-based Lag Studios, using GameMaker 8, which only had rudimentary 3D support.

The game was released in 2014 as freeware, and in 2015 it was released on Steam. Two DLCs have been released for the game: Karamari Hospital (2015) and Spooky's Dollhouse (2020).

On May 20, 2016, Lag Studios announced that they had entered a legal dispute around July 2015 with a company called Spooky House Studios over the "Spooky House" trademark. As a result, they decided to change the game's name to Spooky's Jump Scare Mansion.

=== Remake ===
A recreated version of the game, remade using the Unity engine, was released on Steam in 2017 under the title Spooky's Jump Scare Mansion: HD Renovation by Albino Moose Games. The remake was released on PlayStation 4, Nintendo Switch, and Xbox One in later years.

The Steam and PlayStation 4 versions of the HD remake can be played in virtual reality, with the latter requiring the use of the PlayStation VR headset.

== Reception ==
The game became one of the many popular horror video games among YouTubers doing Let's Play streams, where players often perform humorous commentary or in-game actions while playing.

Griffin McElroy of Polygon described the game as a "weird hybrid of parody of the jump scare horror genre, and genuinely horrifying game". Ian Higton of Eurogamer praised the PlayStation VR version of the game's remake, writing that "you can almost feel [the specimens'] physical presence gaining on you as you try to escape". He compared the experience to "dropping acid and going to a Halloween Horror Fright Night".
