= List of PlayStation VR2 games =

List of games for second-generation VR headset

This article lists current and upcoming games for the PlayStation VR2 headset.

There are currently 438 games on this list. (Note: This number is always up to date by this script.)

Key
CB	Supports cross-buy (game can be played at no additional cost if one owns the PlayStation VR version)
CP	Supports cross-play
GD	Game demo also available for free
	PlayStation VR2-exclusive
‡	Includes both VR and non-VR modes
Title	Delisted from the PlayStation Store

Title	Genre(s)	Developer(s)	Publisher(s)	Release date			Features	Ref.
Title	Genre(s)	Developer(s)	Publisher(s)	Japan	North America	Europe	Features	Ref.
2MD: VR Football Unleashed ALL☆STAR	Sports	Truant Pixel	Truant Pixel	Feb 22, 2023	Feb 22, 2023	Feb 22, 2023		
The 7th Guest VR	Adventure; Horror	Vertigo Games	Vertigo Games	Oct 19, 2023	Oct 19, 2023	Oct 19, 2023		
90s Extreme Skiing	Sports	Tunermaxx Media	Tunermaxx Media	Jan 23, 2025	Jan 23, 2025	Jan 23, 2025		
A Fisherman's Tale	Adventure	InnerspaceVR	Vertigo Games	Aug 31, 2023	Aug 31, 2023	Aug 31, 2023		
Aces of Thunder	Action; Combat flight simulation	Gaijin Entertainment	Gaijin Entertainment	Feb 3, 2026	Feb 3, 2026	Feb 3, 2026	CP	
Across the Valley	Simulation	FusionPlay	FusionPlay	Apr 6, 2023	Apr 6, 2023	Apr 6, 2023		
AFFECTED: The Manor	Horror	Fallen Planet Studios	Fallen Planet Studios	Unreleased	Dec 15, 2023	Dec 15, 2023	CB	
After the Fall	Action-adventure	Vertigo Games	Vertigo Games	Feb 22, 2023	Feb 22, 2023	Feb 22, 2023	CP	
AFTERLIFE VR	Horror	Split Light Studio	Perp Games	Apr 20, 2023	Apr 20, 2023	Apr 20, 2023		
Akka Arrh ‡	Arcade; Bullet hell	Llamasoft	Atari	Mar 8, 2024	Mar 8, 2024	Mar 8, 2024		
Alien: Rogue Incursion	Action; Horror	Survios	20th Century Games	Dec 19, 2024	Dec 19, 2024	Dec 19, 2024		
Already Dead	Survival horror	Mooncall Games	Mooncall Games	TBA	TBA	TBA		
Altair Breaker	Action; Role-playing	Thirdverse	Thirdverse	Feb 22, 2023	Feb 22, 2023	Feb 22, 2023		
Alvo VR	First-person shooter	Mardonpol	OutsideIn Entertainment	Sep 14, 2023	Sep 14, 2023	Sep 14, 2023	CP	
Amid Evil VR	Action-adventure	Indefatigable; Andre Elijah Immersive	New Blood Interactive	TBA	TBA	TBA		
Among Us VR	Party; Social deduction	Schell Games; Innersloth; Robot Teddy	Innersloth	Unreleased	Dec 4, 2023	Dec 5, 2023	CP	
Ancient Dungeon VR	Rogue-like	Eric Thullen; Maze Theory	Maze Theory	Unreleased	Dec 8, 2023	Dec 7, 2023		
Angry Birds VR: Isle of Pigs	Casual; Puzzle	Resolution Games	Resolution Games	Oct 10, 2023	Oct 10, 2023	Oct 10, 2023		
Another Fisherman's Tale	Adventure	InnerspaceVR	Vertigo Games	May 11, 2023	May 11, 2023	May 11, 2023		
Apollo 13: The Lost Tapes VR	Horror; Shooter	Reverie Interactive	Reverie Interactive	Unreleased	Apr 17, 2024	Unreleased		
Arashi: Castles of Sin - Final Cut	Action	Endeavor One	Skydance Interactive	Dec 5, 2023	Dec 5, 2023	Dec 5, 2023		
Arcade Paradise VR	Simulation	Nosebleed Interactive	Wired Productions	Aug 8, 2024	Aug 8, 2024	Aug 8, 2024		
Arizona Sunshine Remake	First-person shooter	Vertigo Games	Vertigo Games	Oct 17, 2024	Oct 17, 2024	Oct 17, 2024		
Arizona Sunshine 2	First-person shooter	Vertigo Games	Vertigo Games	Dec 7, 2023	Dec 7, 2023	Dec 7, 2023	CP	
Arken Age	Action-adventure	VitruviusVR	VitruviusVR	Jan 16, 2025	Jan 16, 2025	Jan 16, 2025		
Astro Hunters VR	Shooter	Wenkly Studio	Wenkly Studio	TBA	TBA	TBA		
Audio Trip	Rhythm	Kinemotik Studios	Impact Reality	Nov 11, 2025	Nov 11, 2025	Nov 11, 2025		
AUTOMA	Action-adventure	Phospher Studio	Phospher Studio	2026	2026	2026		
Awesome Asteroids	Arcade; Shooter	Strange Games Studios	Strange Games Studios	Feb 22, 2023	Feb 22, 2023	Feb 22, 2023		
B99 Overclocked	Rogue-like	Iron Stomach	Iron Stomach	Unreleased	Jul 12, 2023	Sep 1, 2023		
Bad Dreams	Horror	Creative VR 3D	Creative VR 3D	Jan 23, 2024	Nov 24, 2023	Nov 24, 2023		
Badminton Time VR	Sports	Fishing Cactus	Perp Games; Decathlon	Jun 25, 2026	Jun 17, 2025	Jun 17, 2025		
Barbaria	Action; Strategy	Stalwart Games	Stalwart Games	Nov 9, 2023	Nov 9, 2023	Nov 9, 2023	GD	
Bartender VR Simulator	Simulation	VR Factory	VR Factory	Feb 8, 2024	Feb 8, 2024	Feb 8, 2024		
Battle Bows	Action; Shooter	WIMO Games	WIMO Games	TBA	TBA	TBA		
Beat Saber	Rhythm	Beat Games	Beat Games	May 24, 2023	May 24, 2023	May 24, 2023	CB	
Beat the Beats VR	Rhythm; Sports	Parallel Circles	Parallel Circles	Feb 27, 2024	Feb 27, 2024	Feb 27, 2024	GD	
Before Your Eyes VR	Adventure	GoodbyeWorld Games	Skybound Entertainment	Mar 10, 2023	Mar 10, 2023	Mar 10, 2023		
Behemoth	Action	Skydance Interactive	Skydance Interactive	Dec 5, 2024	Dec 5, 2024	Dec 5, 2024		
Behind the Frame: The Finest Scenery VR	Adventure	Akupara Games	Akupara Games	Sep 14, 2023	Sep 14, 2023	Sep 14, 2023		
BIG SHOTS	Shooter; Rogue-like	AlterEyes	AlterEyes	Apr 18, 2024	Apr 18, 2024	Apr 18, 2024	CP	
Black Hole Pool	Sports; Simulation	Pixel Works	Pixel Works	Unreleased	Apr 14, 2025	Apr 14, 2025	CP	
Blacktop Hoops VR	Sports	Vinci Games	Vinci Games	Sep 30, 2025	Sep 30, 2025	Sep 30, 2025		
BLINNK and the Vacuum of Space	Adventure; Simulation	Changingday	Changingday	Oct 10, 2023	Oct 10, 2023	Oct 10, 2023		
Bloody Hell Hotel	Action-adventure	Unfold Games	Unfold Games	TBA	TBA	TBA		
Bocce VR Simulator	Sports; Simulation	GameBoom VR; Big Cheese Studio	Source Byte	Aug 9, 2024	Aug 9, 2024	Aug 9, 2024		
Bootstrap Island	Survival; Rogue-like	Maru VR	Maru VR	Aug 13, 2026	Aug 13, 2026	Aug 13, 2026		
Border Bots VR	Puzzle; Simulation	vTime Games	Team17	Feb 8, 2024	Feb 8, 2024	Feb 8, 2024		
Box To The Beat VR	Rhythm; Sports	Khosouf Studio	Khosouf Studio	Oct 17, 2023	Oct 17, 2023	Oct 17, 2023	GD	
Boxing Underdog	Sports; Fighting	Monologic Games	Monologic Games	TBA	TBA	TBA		
The Boys: Trigger Warning	Action; Stealth	ARVORE	Sony Pictures Virtual Reality	Unreleased	Jun 9, 2026	Jun 9, 2026		
Brain Beats	Rhythm	Frost Earth Studio	My World	May 18, 2023	May 18, 2023	May 18, 2023		
Breachers	Action; Shooter	Triangle Factory	Triangle Factory	Dec 20, 2023	Dec 20, 2023	Dec 20, 2023	CP	
Break Stuff VR	Casual	SingleStep Games	SingleStep Games	Jun 7, 2023	Jun 7, 2023	Jun 6, 2023		
Bridge Constructor Studio ‡	Puzzle	ClockStone Studios	Headup Games	Jul 17, 2025	Jul 17, 2025	Jul 17, 2025		
Bridge the Gap!	Casual; Puzzle	3R Games	Take IT Studio!	Jan 17, 2025	Jan 17, 2025	Jan 17, 2025		
Broken Edge	Action; Fighting	Trebuchet Studio	Fast Travel Games	Sep 19, 2023	Sep 19, 2023	Sep 19, 2023	CP	
Budget Cuts Ultimate	Stealth; Action	Neat Corporation	Neat Corporation	Jun 1, 2023	Jun 1, 2023	Jun 1, 2023		
Builder Simulator VR	Simulation	EpicVR	EpicVR	TBA	TBA	TBA		
Bulletstorm VR	First-person shooter	Incuvo	People Can Fly	Jan 18, 2024	Jan 18, 2024	Jan 18, 2024		
C-Smash VRS ‡	Sports; Puzzle	RapidEyeMovers; Wolf & Wood Interactive	RapidEyeMovers	Jun 23, 2023	Jun 23, 2023	Jun 23, 2023	GD	
C.A.B.A. ‡	Horror; Puzzle	Hypnos Team	ALLWARE	TBA	TBA	TBA		
Cactus Cowboy - Desert Warfare	Shooter	Cactus VR Studios	Cactus VR Studios	Nov 2, 2023	Nov 2, 2023	Nov 2, 2023		
Cactus Cowboy - Plants At War	Shooter	Cactus VR Studios	Cactus VR Studios	Feb 22, 2023	Feb 22, 2023	Feb 22, 2023		
Captain Toonhead Vs. The Punks from Outer Space	Strategy	Teravision Games	Teravision Games	Unreleased	Mar 21, 2024	Jul 4, 2024		
Car Mechanic Simulator VR	Simulation	GameFormatic	PlayWay	Unreleased	Jan 17, 2024	Jan 17, 2024		
Cave Crave	Simulation	3R Games	Take IT Studio!	Jul 10, 2025	Jul 10, 2025	Jul 10, 2025		
Cave Digger 2: Dig Harder	Action-adventure; Rogue-like	VRKiwi	VRKiwi	Feb 22, 2023	Feb 22, 2023	Feb 22, 2023	CBCP	
Cave Digger VR	Action-adventure; Rogue-like	VRKiwi	VRKiwi	Jun 1, 2023	Jun 1, 2023	Jun 1, 2023	CB	
Chernobyl Again	Adventure; Puzzle	Vimagineo	Vimagineo	Sep 12, 2024	Sep 12, 2024	Sep 12, 2024		
Chess Club	Strategy	Odders Lab	Odders Lab	Jul 18, 2025	Jul 18, 2025	Jul 18, 2025		
Cities: VR	City-building	Fast Travel Games	Fast Travel Games	Feb 22, 2023	Feb 22, 2023	Feb 22, 2023		
City of Hunger	Horror	MVCAO Studios	MVCAO Studios	Jan 21, 2026	Jan 21, 2026	Jan 21, 2026		
Cleansheet Football	Sports	INCISIV	INCISIV	May 16, 2024	May 16, 2024	May 16, 2024		
CleanSheet Football 2	Sports	INCISIV	INCISIV	Jun 11, 2026	Jun 11, 2026	Jun 11, 2026		
Climate Station ‡	Educational	Sony Interactive Entertainment	Sony Interactive Entertainment	Jun 18, 2025	Jun 18, 2025	Jun 18, 2025		
COLD VR	Shooter; Strategy	ALLWARE	ALLWARE	TBA	TBA	TBA		
Colorway Antics	Casual	Mīharo Innovations	Mīharo Innovations	TBA	TBA	TBA		
Colossal Cave	Adventure; Puzzle	Cygnus Entertainment	Cygnus Entertainment	Nov 15, 2023	Nov 15, 2023	Nov 15, 2023		
COMPOUND	Shooter; Roguelite	Bevan McKechnie; notdead	notdead	Aug 13, 2024	Aug 13, 2024	Aug 13, 2024		
Contractors Showdown	First-person shooter; Battle royale	Caveman Studio	Caveman Studio	TBA	TBA	TBA		
Cooking Simulator VR	Simulation	GameBoom VR; Big Cheese Studio	PlayWay	Unreleased	Dec 15, 2023	Dec 15, 2023		
Corridor VR	Puzzle	Bare Games	Bare Games	Nov 15, 2024	Nov 15, 2024	Nov 15, 2024		
Cosmodread	Survival horror; Rogue-like	White Door Games	White Door Games	May 24, 2023	May 24, 2023	May 24, 2023		
Cosmonious High	Adventure	Owlchemy Labs	Owlchemy Labs	Feb 22, 2023	Feb 22, 2023	Feb 22, 2023	GD	
Crazy Kung Fu	Action; Sports	Field Of Vision	Field Of Vision	May 30, 2024	May 30, 2024	May 30, 2024		
Creed: Rise to Glory	Sports	Survios	Survios	Apr 4, 2023	Apr 4, 2023	Apr 4, 2023	CP	
Crimen - Mercenary Tales	Action-adventure	Carbon Studio	Carbon Studio	Unreleased	Sep 13, 2024	Sep 13, 2024		
Crisis Brigade 2 reloaded	Shooter	Sumalab	Sumalab	Sep 14, 2023	Sep 14, 2023	Sep 14, 2023	CBCP	
CrossFire: Sierra Squad	First-person shooter	Smilegate	Smilegate	Aug 29, 2023	Aug 29, 2023	Aug 29, 2023	CP	
cyubeVR	Adventure	Stonebrick Studios	Stonebrick Studios	Feb 7, 2025	Mar 16, 2024	Mar 16, 2024		
D-Day Enhanced	First-person shooter	Strange Games Studios	Strange Games Studios	Jan 23, 2024	Jan 23, 2024	Jan 23, 2024	CB	
The Dark Pictures: Switchback VR	Rail shooter	Supermassive Games	Supermassive Games	Mar 16, 2023	Mar 16, 2023	Mar 16, 2023		
Darkness Rollercoaster Remastered	Railshooter	VR3D Creative Team	VR3D Creative Team	Unreleased	Oct 29, 2024	Oct 29, 2024		
Darksword: Battle Eternity	Action; Role-playing	Com2uS ROCA	Com2uS ROCA	Aug 8, 2024	Aug 8, 2024	Aug 8, 2024		
Dead Hook	Action-adventure; Shooter	Joy Way	Joy Way	Feb 8, 2024	Feb 8, 2024	Feb 8, 2024		
Dead Land 2 VR	Action; Shooter	Kodobur	Kodobur	Jan 31, 2025	Jan 31, 2025	Jan 31, 2025		
Dead Land: Polygon VR	Action; Shooter	Kodobur	Kodobur	Dec 3, 2024	Dec 3, 2024	Dec 3, 2024		
Dead Second	Action; Shooter	Spunge Games	Spunge Games	Sep 12, 2024	Sep 12, 2024	Sep 12, 2024		
Death Horizon Reloaded	Action; Shooter	Horizon Lab	Horizon Lab	Dec 17, 2025	Dec 17, 2025	Dec 17, 2025		
Death Relives	Action; Horror	Nyctophile Studios	Nyctophile Studios	TBA	TBA	TBA		
Deep Cuts	Action	Scythe Dev Team	TinyBuild	TBA	TBA	TBA		
Deisim	Strategy	Myron Games	Myron Games	TBA	TBA	TBA		
Demeo ‡	Role-playing; Tabletop	Resolution Games	Resolution Games	Feb 22, 2023	Feb 22, 2023	Feb 22, 2023	CP	
Demeo Battles VR	Role-playing; Tabletop	Resolution Games	Resolution Games	Dec 17, 2024	Dec 17, 2024	Dec 17, 2024		
Demeo x Dungeons & Dragons: Battlemarked ‡	Role-playing; Tabletop	Resolution Games	Resolution Games	Nov 20, 2025	Nov 20, 2025	Nov 20, 2025		
Desperate Vladivostok	First-person shooter	MIROWIN	Perp Games	TBA	TBA	TBA		
Detective VR	Adventure; Puzzle	Studio CHIPO Y JUAN	VRKiwi	Sep 9, 2026	Sep 9, 2026	Sep 9, 2026		
DIG VR	Casual; Simulation	Just Add Water	Wired Productions	Apr 29, 2025	Apr 29, 2025	Apr 29, 2025		
Doctor Who: The Edge of Time	Adventure	Maze Theory	Maze Theory	Unreleased	Apr 23, 2024	Apr 23, 2024		
DodgeCraft	Sports	INCISIV	INCISIV	Feb 13, 2025	Feb 13, 2025	Feb 13, 2025		
Down and Out	Action-adventure; Fighting	Zatun	Zatun	Sep 14, 2023	Sep 14, 2023	Sep 14, 2023		
Dreams of Another ‡	Shooter	Q-Games	Q-Games	Oct 10, 2025	Oct 10, 2025	Oct 10, 2025		
Drop Dead: The Cabin	Shooter	Soul Assembly	Impact Reality	Sep 10, 2026	Sep 10, 2026	Sep 10, 2026		
Dropship Commander ‡	Arcade	Strange Games Studios	Strange Games Studios	Unreleased	Jun 15, 2024	Jun 15, 2024		
Drums Rock	Rhythm	Garage51	Garage51	Feb 22, 2023	Feb 22, 2023	Feb 22, 2023	GD	
Drunkn Bar Fight	Action; Fighting	The Munky	The Munky	Nov 17, 2023	Nov 17, 2023	Nov 17, 2023		
Drunkn Bar Fight 2	Action; Fighting	The Munky	The Munky	Unreleased	Jun 12, 2025	Jun 12, 2025		
Dungeons Of The Deep VR	Action-adventure; Dungeon Crawler	Gray Mantis	Gray Mantis	Jun 1, 2026	Jun 1, 2026	Jun 1, 2026		
DYSCHRONIA: Chronos Alternate	Adventure	MyDearest; Izanagi Games	Perp Games	Feb 22, 2023	Feb 22, 2023	Feb 22, 2023		
Electrician Simulator VR	Simulation	Take IT Studio!	Take IT Studio!	Mar 21, 2025	Mar 21, 2025	Mar 21, 2025		
Eleven Table Tennis	Sports; Simulation	For Fun Labs	For Fun Labs	TBA	TBA	TBA		
Encircled	Strategy; Shooter	Core Strand	Core Strand	Sep 27, 2024	Sep 27, 2024	Sep 27, 2024		
Epic Roller Coasters	Simulation	B4T Games	B4T Games	Dec 14, 2023	Dec 14, 2023	Dec 14, 2023		
Epyka	Adventure; Puzzle	Singular Perception	Singular Perception	Jun 5, 2025	Jun 5, 2025	Jun 5, 2025		
Escaping Wonderland	Adventure; Puzzle	Cortopia Studios	Beyond Frames Entertainment	Jun 18, 2025	Jun 18, 2025	Jun 18, 2025		
The Events at Unity Farm	Role-playing	Titan1Studios	Titan1Studios	TBA	TBA	TBA		
Evil Inside VR	Horror	JanduSoft	JanduSoft	May 7, 2026	May 7, 2026	May 7, 2026		
EXOcars	Racing	XOCUS	Funtech Publishing	Apr 17, 2025	Mar 6, 2025	Mar 6, 2025		
The Exorcist: Legion VR	Adventure; Horror	Wolf & Wood Interactive	Fun Train	Unreleased	May 28, 2024	May 28, 2024		
Fantavision 202X ‡	Puzzle	Cosmo Machia	Cosmo Machia	Feb 22, 2023	Feb 22, 2023	Feb 22, 2023		
Final Fury	Fighting	Kluge Interactive	Kluge Interactive	TBA	TBA	TBA		
Firewall Ultra	First-person shooter	First Contact Entertainment	Sony Interactive Entertainment	Aug 24, 2023	Aug 24, 2023	Aug 24, 2023		
Firmament ‡	Adventure	Cyan Worlds	Cyan Worlds	Jul 2, 2025	Jul 2, 2025	Jul 2, 2025		
Five Nights at Freddy's: Help Wanted - Full Time Edition ‡	Horror	Scott Cawthon, Steel Wool Studios	Scott Cawthon	Nov 21, 2023	Nov 21, 2023	Nov 21, 2023		
Five Nights at Freddy’s: Help Wanted 2 ‡	Horror	Steel Wool Studios	ScottGames	Dec 14, 2023	Dec 14, 2023	Dec 14, 2023		
Five Nights at Freddy's: Secret of the Mimic ‡	Horror	Steel Wool Studios	ScottGames	Apr 28, 2026	Apr 28, 2026	Apr 28, 2026		
FlatOut	Racing	Flat2VR Studios	Strategy First	TBA	TBA	TBA		
FlatOut 4: Total Insanity VR	Racing	Flat2VR Studios	Impact Reality	TBA	TBA	TBA		
The Foglands ‡	Rogue-like	Well Told Entertainment	Well Told Entertainment	Oct 31, 2023	Oct 31, 2023	Oct 31, 2023		
Forefront	First-person shooter	Triangle Factory	Triangle Factory	TBA	TBA	TBA		
Forest Farm	Casual; Simulation	Nic Schubert	Tonic Games Australia	Mar 29, 2024	Apr 6, 2024	Mar 29, 2024		
ForeVR Bowl	Social; Simulation; Sports	ForeVR Games	ForeVR Games	Dec 19, 2023	Dec 19, 2023	Dec 19, 2023		
ForeVR Cornhole	Social; Simulation; Sports	ForeVR Games	ForeVR Games	Unreleased	Jun 21, 2024	Jun 21, 2024		
ForeVR Darts	Social; Simulation; Sports	ForeVR Games	ForeVR Games	TBA	TBA	TBA		
ForeVR Pool	Social; Simulation; Sports	ForeVR Games	ForeVR Games	Unreleased	Nov 30, 2023	Dec 4, 2023		
Galaxy Kart	Racing	VRMonkey	VRMonkey	Mar 24, 2023	Mar 24, 2023	Mar 24, 2023		
Garden of the Sea	Adventure; Casual; Simulation	Neat Corporation	Neat Corporation	Feb 22, 2023	Feb 22, 2023	Feb 22, 2023		
GAZZLERS	First-person shooter	Banzai Studios	Odders Lab	Oct 4, 2023	Oct 4, 2023	Oct 4, 2023		
Genotype	Action-adventure; Shooter	Bolverk VR Games	Bolverk VR Games	Unreleased	Mar 22, 2024	Mar 23, 2024		
Get Out!	Horror	Creative VR 3D	Creative VR 3D	May 30, 2025	May 30, 2025	May 30, 2025		
Ghost Signal: A Stellaris Game	Action-adventure	Fast Travel Games	Fast Travel Games	Oct 5, 2023	Oct 5, 2023	Oct 5, 2023	GD	
Ghost Town	Adventure; Puzzle	Fireproof Studios	Fireproof Studios	Dec 1, 2025	Dec 1, 2025	Dec 1, 2025		
Ghostbusters: Rise of the Ghost Lord	Action-adventure	NDreams	Sony Pictures Virtual Reality	Oct 26, 2023	Oct 26, 2023	Oct 26, 2023	CP	
Ghosts of Tabor	First-person Shooter; Simulation	Combat Waffle Studios	Perp Games; Beyond Frames Entertainment	Unreleased	May 7, 2025	May 7, 2025		
Glassbreakers: Champions of Moss	Fighting; Strategy	Polyarc	Polyarc	TBA	TBA	TBA		
God Of Riffs: Battle for the Metalverse	Rhythm	VYERSOFT	VYERSOFT	Unreleased	Dec 1, 2025	Dec 1, 2025		
GOLF+	Sports; Simulation	Golf Scope	Golf Scope	TBA	TBA	TBA		
Gorilla Attack	Action-adventure; Arcade	Take IT Studio!	Take IT Studio!	Jan 23, 2025	Jan 23, 2025	Jan 23, 2025		
Gorilla Tag	Casual; Social	Another Axiom	Another Axiom	Unreleased	Nov 8, 2024	Unreleased		
GORN	Action; Fighting	Free Lives	Devolver Digital	Mar 30, 2023	Mar 30, 2023	Mar 30, 2023	CB	
GORN 2	Action; Fighting	Free Lives; Cortopia Studios	Devolver Digital	Jul 14, 2025	Jul 14, 2025	Jul 14, 2025		
Gran Turismo 7 ‡	Racing simulation	Polyphony Digital	Sony Interactive Entertainment	Feb 22, 2023	Feb 22, 2023	Feb 22, 2023		
Grand Rush VR	Casual; Racing	404 Games	404 Games	Sep 27, 2024	Sep 27, 2024	Sep 27, 2024		
Green Hell VR	Action-adventure; Survival	Incuvo	Incuvo	Aug 15, 2023	Aug 15, 2023	Aug 15, 2023		
GRIM	Action-adventure; Survival	Spoonfed Interactive; Combat Waffle Studios	Combat Waffle Studios	TBA	TBA	TBA		
Grit and Valor - 1949 ‡	Strategy; Real-time tactics	Milky Tea	Megabit Publishing	Aug 21, 2025	Aug 21, 2025	Aug 21, 2025		
Gun Club VR Reloaded	Shooter	The Binary Mill	The Binary Mill	Dec 18, 2023	Dec 18, 2023	Dec 18, 2023		
HappyFunland	Horror	Spectral Illusions	Perp Games	Mar 22, 2024	Mar 22, 2024	Mar 22, 2024		
Harpagun	Action-adventure	Something Random	Something Random	Unreleased	Apr 10, 2025	Apr 10, 2025		
Hello Neighbor VR: Search and Rescue	Adventure; Puzzle; Horror	Steel Wool Games	TinyBuild	May 25, 2023	May 25, 2023	May 25, 2023		
Hellsweeper VR	Action; Rogue-like	Vertigo Games	Vertigo Games	Sep 21, 2023	Sep 21, 2023	Sep 21, 2023	CP	
Heroes of Forever	Shooter	Lucky Mountain Games	Lucky Mountain Games	TBA	TBA	TBA		
Hidden Memories of The Gardens Between	Adventure; Puzzle	The Voxel Agents	The Voxel Agents	Aug 12, 2025	Aug 12, 2025	Aug 12, 2025		
Hide The Corpse	Puzzle; Simulation	Realcast	HyperVR Games	Aug 18, 2025	Aug 18, 2025	Aug 18, 2025		
Hitman World of Assassination ‡	Stealth	IO Interactive	IO Interactive	Mar 27, 2025	Mar 27, 2025	Mar 27, 2025		
Horizon Call of the Mountain	Action-adventure	Firesprite; Guerrilla Games	Sony Interactive Entertainment	Feb 22, 2023	Feb 22, 2023	Feb 22, 2023	GD	
Horror Adventure : Zombie Edition	Action; Horror	Yash Future Tech Solutions	Yash Future Tech Solutions	Aug 14, 2024	Aug 14, 2024	Aug 14, 2024	GD	
Hotel Infinity	Adventure; Puzzle	Studio Chyr	Studio Chyr	Nov 13, 2025	Nov 13, 2025	Nov 13, 2025		
Hotel R'n'R	Action; Simulation	Wolf & Wood Interactive	Wolf & Wood Interactive	Unreleased	Dec 20, 2023	Dec 20, 2023	CB	
House Flipper VR	Casual; Simulation	Frozen Way	Frozen Way	Oct 22, 2024	Oct 21, 2024	Oct 21, 2024		
The House of Da Vinci VR	Adventure; Puzzle	Blue Brain Games	Blue Brain Games	May 1, 2025	May 1, 2025	May 1, 2025		
Hubris	Action-adventure	Cyborn B.V.	Cyborn B.V.	Jun 22, 2023	Jun 22, 2023	Jun 22, 2023	GD	
Human Fall Flat VR	Puzzle-platform	No Brakes Games	Curve Games	Dec 5, 2024	Dec 5, 2024	Dec 5, 2024		
Humanity ‡	Puzzle	tha ltd.	Enhance	May 16, 2023	May 16, 2023	May 16, 2023	GD	
Hyperstacks	Bullet hell	Squirrel Bytes	Squirrel Bytes	TBA	TBA	TBA		
I Am Cat	Casual; Simulation	NEW FOLDER GAMES	NEW FOLDER GAMES	Unreleased	May 6, 2026	May 6, 2026		
I Am Security	Casual; Simulation	NEW FOLDER GAMES	NEW FOLDER GAMES	TBA	TBA	TBA		
I, Robot ‡	Arcade shooter	Llamasoft	Atari	TBA	TBA	TBA		
Idol Maker VR	Simulation; Rhythm	Yeda Entertainment	CFK	Nov 21, 2024	Nov 21, 2024	Nov 21, 2024		
Ilysia	Massively multiplayer online role-playing game	Team 21 Studio	Team 21 Studio	TBA	TBA	TBA		
Infinite Inside	Puzzle	Maze Theory	Maze Theory	Jul 12, 2024	Jul 12, 2024	Jul 12, 2024		
Into Black	Adventure	The Binary Mill	The Binary Mill	Aug 28, 2025	Aug 28, 2025	Aug 28, 2025		
Into The Darkness VR	Action-adventure	Gameboom VR	Gameboom VR	TBA	TBA	TBA		
Into The Radius	Shooter; Survival	CM IMMERSIVE	CM IMMERSIVE	Sep 19, 2024	Sep 19, 2024	Sep 19, 2024		
Into The Radius 2	Shooter; Survival	CM IMMERSIVE	CM IMMERSIVE	Sep 24, 2026	Sep 24, 2026	Sep 24, 2026		
Inverse	Survival horror	MassVR	MassVR	TBA	TBA	TBA		
Iron Guard	Strategy	Xlab Digital	Xlab Digital	May 15, 2025	May 15, 2025	May 15, 2025		
Iron Guard: Salvation	Strategy	Xlab Digital	Xlab Digital	Mar 5, 2026	Mar 5, 2026	Mar 5, 2026		
IRON REBELLION	Action	Black Beach Studio	Black Beach Studio	TBA	TBA	TBA		
Island Time VR	Casual; Simulation	Flight School Studio	Flight School Studio	Unreleased	May 8, 2024	Unreleased		
Job Simulator	Casual; Simulation	Owlchemy Labs	Owlchemy Labs	Feb 22, 2023	Feb 22, 2023	Feb 22, 2023	CB	
Journey to Foundation	Adventure	Archiact Interactive	Archiact Interactive	Oct 26, 2023	Oct 26, 2023	Oct 26, 2023		
Jurassic World Aftermath Collection	Stealth	Coatsink Software	Coatsink Software	Feb 22, 2023	Feb 22, 2023	Feb 22, 2023	CB	
JUST HOOPS	Sports	Realcast	Realcast	TBA	TBA	TBA		
K-ONE ‡	Educational	Knowledge Dimension	Knowledge Dimension	Unreleased	Jun 27, 2024	Jun 27, 2024		
Kayak VR: Mirage	Casual; Simulation; Sports	Better Than Life	Better Than Life	Feb 22, 2023	Feb 22, 2023	Feb 22, 2023		
Kill It With Fire VR	Action-adventure; Simulation	Casey Donnellan Games	Casey Donnellan Games	Nov 7, 2023	Nov 7, 2023	Nov 7, 2023		
Kizuna AI - Touch the Beat!	Rhythm	Gemdrops	Kizuna AI Inc.	Feb 22, 2023	Feb 22, 2023	Feb 22, 2023		
Koi-Koi: Love Blossoms ‡	Adventure	Apricot Heart	Apricot Heart	Nov 16, 2023	Nov 15, 2023	Nov 16, 2023		
Kromaia	Arcade; Bullet hell	Kraken Empire	Entalto Publishing	TBA	TBA	TBA		
The Last Clockwinder	Puzzle	Pontoco	Cyan Ventures	Feb 22, 2023	Feb 22, 2023	Feb 22, 2023		
Last Labyrinth	Puzzle; Adventure	Amata K.K.	Amata K.K.	Mar 22, 2023	Mar 22, 2023	Mar 22, 2023	CB	
The Last Worker ‡	Adventure	Oiffy; Wolf & Wood Interactive Limited	Wired Productions	Mar 30, 2023	Mar 30, 2023	Mar 30, 2023		
Legendary Tales	Action; Role-playing	Urban Wolf Games	Urban Wolf Games	Feb 8, 2024	Feb 8, 2024	Feb 8, 2024	CP	
Les Mills Bodycombat	Sports	Odders Lab	Odders Lab	Feb 22, 2023	Feb 22, 2023	Feb 22, 2023		
The Light Brigade	Shooter; Role-playing	Funktronic Labs	Funktronic Labs	Feb 22, 2023	Feb 22, 2023	Feb 22, 2023		
Little Cities: Bigger!	City-building	Purple Yonder	NDreams	Mar 12, 2024	Mar 12, 2024	Mar 12, 2024		
Little Nightmares VR: Altered Echoes	Adventure; Puzzle	Iconik	Bandai Namco Entertainment	Apr 24, 2026	Apr 24, 2026	Apr 24, 2026		
The Long Survival	Shooter	Friendly Fire Studios	Friendly Fire Studios	Aug 17, 2026	Aug 17, 2026	Aug 17, 2026		
Low-Fi ‡	Adventure; Role-playing	IRIS VR	IRIS VR	TBA	TBA	TBA		
Lumines Arise ‡	Casual	Enhance; Monstars	Enhance	Nov 11, 2025	Nov 11, 2025	Nov 11, 2025	GD	
MADiSON VR	Survival horror	Bloodious Games	Perp Games	Unreleased	May 2, 2024	May 2, 2024		
Maestro	Rhythm	Double Jack	Double Jack	Jun 20, 2025	Jun 20, 2025	Jun 20, 2025		
Maid of Sker VR	Survival horror	Wales Interactive	Wales Interactive	Unreleased	Mar 17, 2026	Mar 17, 2026		
Mare	Adventure	Lonekite Games	Lonekite Games	Nov 18, 2024	Nov 18, 2024	Nov 18, 2024		
Mars Kitchen VR	Casual; Simulation	Taco Studios	Taco Studios	Unreleased	Jan 16, 2026	Jan 16, 2026		
Masternoid	Arcade	Pixel Magnet	Pixel Magnet	Jun 21, 2023	Jun 21, 2023	Jun 21, 2023	GD	
Masters of Light	Action-adventure	COVEN	COVEN	Dec 18, 2024	Dec 18, 2024	Dec 18, 2024		
Math World VR	Educational	Skill Prepare	Skill Prepare	Jun 30, 2023	Jun 29, 2023	Jun 30, 2023		
Max Mustard	Platformer	Toast Interactive	Toast Interactive	Oct 3, 2024	Oct 3, 2024	Oct 3, 2024		
Mecha Party	Action; Shooter	Shanghai Chenni Network Technology	Kingnet Technology	May 9, 2024	Mar 7, 2024	May 9, 2024	CP	
Medieval Dynasty	Adventure; Role-playing	Render Cube	Toplitz Productions	TBA	TBA	TBA		
Memoreum	Action; Horror	Patient 8 Games	2080 Games	TBA	TBA	TBA		
Metal: Hellsinger VR	Rhythm; Shooter	Lab42	Funcom	Oct 3, 2024	Oct 3, 2024	Oct 3, 2024		
Meteora ‡	Action; Racing	Big Boot Games	Big Boot Games	TBA	TBA	TBA		
Metro Awakening	First-person shooter	Vertigo Games	Vertigo Games	Nov 7, 2024	Nov 7, 2024	Nov 7, 2024		
Microsoft Flight Simulator 2024 ‡	Simulation	Asobo Studio	Xbox Game Studios	Apr 30, 2026	Apr 30, 2026	Apr 30, 2026		
The Midnight Walk ‡	Adventure	MoonHood	Fast Travel Games	May 8, 2025	May 8, 2025	May 8, 2025		
Mind Labyrinth VR Dreams	Adventure	Frost Earth Studio	My World	Unreleased	Sep 1, 2025	Sep 1, 2025		
Mixture	Action-adventure	Played With Fire	Perp Games	Apr 12, 2024	Apr 12, 2024	Apr 12, 2024		
Mobile Suit Gundam: Silver Phantom	Adventure; Interactive movie	Bandai Namco Filmworks; Atlas V; Albyon	Astrea	Nov 21, 2025	Nov 21, 2025	Nov 21, 2025		
Monster Snap	Casual; Photography	Moo Duck Games	Moo Duck Games	TBA	TBA	TBA		
Moss	Action-adventure	Polyarc	Polyarc	Feb 22, 2023	Feb 22, 2023	Feb 22, 2023		
Moss: Book II	Action-adventure	Polyarc	Polyarc	Feb 22, 2023	Feb 22, 2023	Feb 22, 2023		
The Murder of Sherlock Holmes	Puzzle	cKolmos narrative.	cKolmos narrative.	May 10, 2024	May 10, 2024	May 10, 2024		
Mutant Boxing League	Sports; Fighting	Filmic Studios	Filmic Studios	Feb 19, 2025	Feb 19, 2025	Feb 19, 2025		
My First Gran Turismo ‡	Racing simulation	Polyphony Digital	Sony Interactive Entertainment	Dec 6, 2024	Dec 6, 2024	Dec 6, 2024		
Myst ‡	Adventure	Cyan Worlds	Cyan Worlds	May 19, 2026	May 19, 2026	May 19, 2026		
Nar Station	Social deduction	Strange Games Studios	Strange Games Studios	TBA	TBA	TBA		
NFL PRO ERA	Sports	StatusPro	StatusPro	Feb 22, 2023	Feb 22, 2023	Feb 22, 2023	GD	
NFL PRO ERA II	Sports	StatusPro	StatusPro	Oct 31, 2023	Oct 31, 2023	Oct 31, 2023		
No Man's Sky ‡	Action-adventure; Survival	Hello Games	Hello Games	Feb 22, 2023	Feb 22, 2023	Feb 22, 2023	CBCP	
No More Rainbows	Platformer	Squido Studio	Squido Studio	Unreleased	Jan 16, 2025	Jan 16, 2025		
Nock	Sports	Normal VR	Normal VR	May 25, 2023	May 25, 2023	May 25, 2023	CP	
Not For Broadcast: VR	Simulation	NotGames; Babaroga	TinyBuild	Dec 14, 2023	Dec 14, 2023	Dec 14, 2023		
The Obsessive Shadow	Horror	Pablo Heckman	ASI Games	TBA	TBA	TBA		
Odania Sports Arena	Sports; Arcade	Odania	Odania	Sep 12, 2025	Sep 12, 2025	Sep 12, 2025		
Of Lies and Rain	Shooter	Castello	Castello	Nov 4, 2025	Nov 4, 2025	Nov 4, 2025	GD	
OhShape Ultimate	Sports; Rhythm	Odders Lab	Odders Lab	Apr 25, 2024	Apr 25, 2024	Apr 25, 2024		
Omega Pilot Evolution	Racing	XOCUS	Funtech Publishing	Aug 13, 2026	Aug 13, 2026	Aug 13, 2026		
One More Delve	Action; Role-playing	ATVR	ATVR	TBA	TBA	TBA		
ONIRIAM	Adventure	My World srls	My World srls	Unreleased	Nov 22, 2024	Nov 22, 2024		
Operation Serpens	Shooter	Ginra Tech	VRKiwi	Feb 23, 2024	Feb 23, 2024	Feb 23, 2024		
Operation Wolf Returns: First Mission VR	Rail shooter	Virtuallyz Gaming	Microids	Jul 13, 2023	Jul 13, 2023	Jul 13, 2023		
Organ Quarter	Survival horror	Outer Brain Studios	Amata K.K.	May 8, 2023	May 8, 2023	May 8, 2023		
Out of Sight VR	First-person shooter	Flat2VR Studios	Starbreeze Publishing	TBA	TBA	TBA		
OVRDARK: A Do Not Open Story	Survival horror	NoxNoctis	Unreality	Unreleased	Mar 29, 2024	Mar 29, 2024		
Paint the Town Red VR	Action	South East Games	South East Games	Mar 14, 2024	Mar 14, 2024	Mar 14, 2024		
Paper Beast Enhanced Edition	Adventure; Puzzle	Pixel Reef	Pixel Reef	Sep 27, 2023	Sep 27, 2023	Sep 27, 2023	GD	
Parkour Labs ‡	Arcade; Platformer	SoyKhaler	PdPartid@games	Mar 12, 2026	Mar 12, 2026	Mar 12, 2026		
Pavlov	First-person shooter	Vankrupt Games	Vankrupt Games	Feb 22, 2023	Feb 22, 2023	Feb 22, 2023	CP	
Peaky Blinders: The King's Ransom	Adventure	Maze Theory	Maze Theory	Nov 2, 2023	Nov 2, 2023	Nov 2, 2023		
Pets & Stuff	Casual; Simulation	HyperVR Games	HyperVR Games	Unreleased	Dec 12, 2024	Dec 12, 2024		
Phasmophobia ‡	Horror	Kinetic Games	Kinetic Games	Oct 29, 2024	Oct 29, 2024	Oct 29, 2024	CP	
Pickleball Multisport VR	Sports; Simulation	Viniot Studios	Viniot Studios	Unreleased	Jan 13, 2025	Jan 13, 2025		
Pirates VR: Jolly Roger	Action-adventure	Split Light Studio	VRKiwi	May 15, 2025	May 15, 2025	May 15, 2025		
Pistol Whip	First-person shooter; Rhythm	Cloudhead Games	Cloudhead Games	Feb 22, 2023	Feb 22, 2023	Feb 22, 2023	CB	
Pixel Ripped 1978	Action-adventure; Arcade	ARVORE	Atari	Jun 15, 2023	Jun 15, 2023	Jun 15, 2023		
Pixel Ripped 1995	Action-adventure; Arcade	ARVORE	ARVORE	Oct 3, 2023	Oct 3, 2023	Oct 3, 2023	CB	
Playground VR	Casual; Simulation	Blacer Studio; ROOM505	Source Byte	Oct 31, 2024	Oct 31, 2024	Oct 31, 2024		
Pneumata	Horror	Deadbolt Interactive	Perp Games	TBA	TBA	TBA		
POOLS ‡	Adventure	Tensori	Tensori	Nov 25, 2025	Nov 25, 2025	Nov 25, 2025		
Portens ‡	Horror; Puzzle	Hypnos Team	ALLWARE	TBA	TBA	TBA		
POSTAL 2: VR	First-person shooter	Team Beef; Flat2VR Studios; Running with Scissors	Impact Reality	TBA	TBA	TBA		
PowerBeatsVR	Fitness; Rhythm	Five Mind Creations	Five Mind Creations	Dec 16, 2024	Dec 16, 2024	Dec 16, 2024		
Presentiment of Death	Action; Shooter	XOCUS	Funtech Publishing	Jun 19, 2025	Jun 19, 2025	Jun 19, 2025		
Prison Boss VR	Casual; Simulation	Trebuchet Studio	Trebuchet Studio	Dec 6, 2023	Dec 6, 2023	Dec 6, 2023	GD	
Prison Boss: Prohibition	Casual; Simulation	Trebuchet Studio	Trebuchet Studio	TBA	TBA	TBA		
Project Louisiana: The Bounds VR	Horror; Adventure	Build the Light Studio	Build the Light Studio	2026	2026	2026		
Project Wingman: Frontline 59	Action	Sector D2	Sector D2	Oct 3, 2023	Oct 3, 2023	Oct 3, 2023		
Propagation: Paradise Hotel	Survival horror	WanadevStudio	WanadevStudio	Oct 12, 2023	Oct 12, 2023	Oct 12, 2023		
Puzzling Places	Puzzle	realities.io	realities.io	Feb 22, 2023	Feb 22, 2023	Feb 22, 2023	CBGD	
Racket Fury: Table Tennis VR	Sports	Pixel Edge Games	Cmoar Studio; Pixel Edge Games	Oct 19, 2023	Oct 19, 2023	Oct 19, 2023		
RAGER	Action	Insane Prey	Impact Reality	Mar 5, 2026	Mar 5, 2026	Mar 5, 2026		
Ragnarock	Rhythm	WanadevStudio	WanadevStudio	Feb 22, 2023	Feb 22, 2023	Feb 22, 2023	GD	
Rainbow Reactor: Fusion - Remastered	Puzzle	Tunermaxx Media	Tunermaxx Media	Mar 1, 2024	Mar 1, 2024	Mar 1, 2024		
Reach	Action-adventure	NDreams	NDreams	Oct 16, 2025	Oct 16, 2025	Oct 16, 2025		
Reading World VR	Educational	Skill Prepare	Skill Prepare	Apr 10, 2024	Apr 9, 2024	Apr 9, 2024		
Rebeloid VR	Casual; Arcade	Beren Studio	Beren Studio	Aug 30, 2025	Aug 30, 2025	Aug 30, 2025		
Red Matter	Adventure; Puzzle	Vertical Robot	Vertical Robot	Oct 5, 2023	Oct 5, 2023	Oct 5, 2023	CB	
Red Matter 2	Adventure; Puzzle	Vertical Robot	Vertical Robot	May 18, 2023	May 18, 2023	May 18, 2023		
Resident Evil 4 ‡	Survival horror	Capcom	Capcom	Dec 8, 2023	Dec 8, 2023	Dec 8, 2023	GD	
Resident Evil Village ‡	Survival horror	Capcom	Capcom	Feb 22, 2023	Feb 22, 2023	Feb 22, 2023	GD	
Resist	Action-adventure	The Binary Mill	The Binary Mill	Apr 10, 2025	Apr 10, 2025	Apr 10, 2025		
Retronika	Action; Racing	4Players-Studio	4Players-Studio	Oct 9, 2025	Oct 9, 2025	Oct 9, 2025		
Retropolis 2: Never Say Goodbye	Adventure	Peanut Button	Perp Games	Jun 14, 2024	Jun 14, 2024	Jun 14, 2024		
Rez Infinite ‡	Rail Shooter; Rhythm	Monstars; Resonair	Enhance	Feb 22, 2023	Feb 22, 2023	Feb 22, 2023		
REZZIL PLAYER	Sports	Rezzil	Rezzil	Nov 17, 2023	Nov 17, 2023	Nov 17, 2023		
Rhythm Planet	Rhythm	Aoga Games	GAMEPOCH	May 19, 2023	May 19, 2023	May 19, 2023		
Richie's Plank Experience	Casual; Simulation	Toast Interactive	Toast Interactive	Nov 20, 2025	Nov 20, 2025	Nov 20, 2025		
Riven ‡	Adventure	Cyan Worlds	Cyan Worlds	May 19, 2026	May 19, 2026	May 19, 2026		
RoboQuest VR	Action; Rogue-lite	Flat2VR Studios; RyseUp Studios	Starbreeze Publishing	Nov 20, 2025	Nov 20, 2025	Nov 20, 2025		
The Room VR: A Dark Matter	Puzzle	Fireproof Studios	Fireproof Studios	Jul 27, 2023	Jul 27, 2023	Jul 27, 2023	CB	
RUINSMAGUS	Action; Role-playing	CharacterBank	CharacterBank	Sep 19, 2023	Sep 19, 2023	Sep 19, 2023		
RUNNER	Arcade; Shooter; Racing	Truant Pixel	Truant Pixel	Feb 22, 2023	Feb 22, 2023	Feb 22, 2023		
RUSH: Apex Edition	Simulation; Sports	The Binary Mill	The Binary Mill	Nov 6, 2025	Nov 6, 2025	Nov 6, 2025		
Samurai Slaughter House	Action-adventure	Tab Games	Tab Games	TBA	TBA	TBA		
Seeker: My Shadow	Puzzle; Adventure	Jestercraft	VRKiwi	Mar 17, 2023	Mar 17, 2023	Mar 17, 2023		
Shadowgate VR: The Mines of Mythrok	Action-adventure	Zojoi; Azure Drop Studios	Flat2VR Studios	Dec 9, 2025	Dec 9, 2025	Dec 9, 2025		
Shadows on the Walls	Adventure; Horror	Raccoon Game Studio	Raccoon Game Studio	TBA	TBA	TBA		
Shave & Stuff	Casual; Simulation	HyperVR Games	HyperVR Games	Unreleased	May 12, 2024	May 12, 2024		
Shop & Stuff: Supermarket Simulator	Casual; Simulation	HyperVR Games	HyperVR Games	TBA	TBA	TBA		
Silent Operative	Action; Shooter	Nic Schubert	Tonic Games Australia	TBA	TBA	TBA	GD	
Sky Climb	Puzzle	VRMonkey	VRMonkey	Jul 10, 2024	Jul 10, 2024	Jul 10, 2024		
SkyLeap	Action; Shooter	XOCUS	Funtech Publishing	Jan 2026	Jan 2026	Jan 2026		
Slap Fighter	Action; Sports	Curious Games	Curious Games	TBA	TBA	TBA		
Slender: The Arrival VR	Survival horror	Blue Isle Studios	Perp Games	TBA	TBA	TBA		
Smash Drums	Rhythm	PotamWorks	PotamWorks	May 15, 2025	May 15, 2025	May 15, 2025		
Snow Scout	Adventure	Tunermaxx Media	Tunermaxx Media	Unreleased	Sep 12, 2024	Sep 12, 2024		
Song in the Smoke: Rekindled	Action-adventure; Survival	17-Bit	17-Bit	Feb 22, 2023	Feb 22, 2023	Feb 22, 2023	CBGD	
SOUL COVENANT	Action; Tactical shooter	Thirdverse	Thirdverse	Apr 18, 2024	Apr 18, 2024	Apr 18, 2024		
Space Docker VR	Simulation	Cat Commandos	Cat Commandos	Feb 1, 2024	Feb 9, 2024	Feb 9, 2024		
Space Drop	Casual; Racing	Odania	Odania	Jul 11, 2025	Jul 11, 2025	Jul 11, 2025		
Space Fist	Fighting	Initory Studios	Initory Studios	Jan 13, 2025	Jan 13, 2025	Jan 13, 2025		
Spin Rhythm XD ‡	Rhythm	Super Spin Digital	Super Spin Digital	Jul 9, 2024	Jul 9, 2024	Jul 9, 2024		
Star Wars: Tales from the Galaxy's Edge – Enhanced Edition	Adventure	ILMxLAB	Disney Interactive	Feb 22, 2023	Feb 22, 2023	Feb 22, 2023	GD	
Starship Troopers: Continuum	Shooter	XR Games	Sony Pictures Virtual Reality	Dec 17, 2024	Dec 17, 2024	Dec 17, 2024		
Startenders: Intergalactic Bartending	Casual; Simulation	Froggy Box Games	Yogscast Games	Feb 22, 2023	Feb 22, 2023	Feb 22, 2023	CB	
Stilt	Adventure; Platformer	Rekt Games	VRKiwi	Mar 8, 2024	Mar 8, 2024	Mar 8, 2024	CP	
Stranger Things VR	Horror	Tender Claws	Tender Claws	Dec 5, 2024	Dec 5, 2024	Dec 5, 2024		
Strayed	Survival	Crustacean Interactive	Crustacean Interactive	TBA	TBA	TBA		
STRIDE: Fates	Action-adventure; Platformer	Joy Way	Joy Way	Unreleased	May 16, 2024	May 16, 2024		
Subside	Simulation	A2D Software	A2D Software	Dec 20, 2024	Dec 20, 2024	Dec 20, 2024	GD	
Sugar Mess - Let's Play Jolly Battle	Arcade; Shooter	JollyCo	JollyCo	May 29, 2024	May 29, 2024	May 29, 2024	GD	
Suicide Guy VR Deluxe	Puzzle; Adventure	Chubby Pixel	Chubby Pixel	Nov 28, 2023	Nov 28, 2023	Nov 28, 2023		
Sunstone of Time	Adventure	VRKiwi; Jetdogs Studios	VRKiwi	TBA	TBA	TBA		
Super Death Game SHOW! VR	Puzzle; Adventure	INTENSE	INTENSE	Aug 1, 2023	Aug 1, 2023	Aug 1, 2023		
SURV1V3	First-person shooter	Candymakers	Candymakers	Jun 16, 2023	Jun 16, 2023	Jun 16, 2023	CBCP	
Survival Nation	Action-adventure	Wenkly Studio	Wenkly Studio	TBA	TBA	TBA		
Surviving Mars: Pioneer	Survival	Bolverk Games	Flat2VR Studios	Sep 12, 2025	Sep 12, 2025	Sep 12, 2025		
Survivorman VR: The Descent	Adventure; Simulation	Cream Productions; Descent VR Productions	VRKiwi	Feb 15, 2024	Feb 15, 2024	Feb 15, 2024		
Sushi Ben VR	Adventure	Big Brane Studios	Big Brane Studios	May 28, 2024	May 28, 2024	May 28, 2024		
Sweet Surrender	Action; Rogue-like	Salmi Games	Salmi Games	Oct 30, 2025	Oct 30, 2025	Oct 30, 2025		
Swordsman VR	Action; Fighting	Sinn Studio	Sinn Studio	Feb 22, 2023	Feb 22, 2023	Feb 22, 2023		
Synapse	Action; Shooter	NDreams	NDreams	Jul 4, 2023	Jul 4, 2023	Jul 4, 2023		
Synth Riders	Rhythm	Kluge Interactive	Kluge Interactive	Feb 22, 2023	Feb 22, 2023	Feb 22, 2023	CBCP	
Synthesis Universe Story -Episode 00-	Art	Synthesis Universe	Synthesis Universe	TBA	TBA	TBA		
System Critical 2	Arcade; Shooter	Old Formulas	Old Formulas	Mar 8, 2024	Mar 8, 2024	Mar 8, 2024		
System Critical 3	Arcade; Shooter	Old Formulas	Old Formulas	Unreleased	Jul 31, 2026	Jul 31, 2026		
The Tale of Onogoro	Action-adventure	Amata K.K.	Amata K.K.	Feb 22, 2023	Feb 22, 2023	Feb 22, 2023	CB	
Talking Dogs ‡	Action-adventure	Carson Kelly Games	Carson Kelly Games	TBA	TBA	TBA		
Tarzan VR	Adventure	Jungle Games	Fun Train	Unreleased	Jun 18, 2024	Jun 18, 2024		
Teahouse Of Souls	Casual; Simulation	Pixelity Games	Pixelity Games	TBA	TBA	TBA		
Tempus 84	Adventure	Portals Edge 360	Portals Edge 360	TBA	TBA	TBA		
Tennis On-Court	Sports	Perp Games	Perp Games	Oct 17, 2023	Oct 17, 2023	Oct 17, 2023		
Tentacular	Action-adventure; Puzzle	Firepunchd Games	Devolver Digital	Feb 22, 2023	Feb 22, 2023	Feb 22, 2023		
Tetris Effect Connected ‡	Puzzle	Monstars; Resonair; Stage Games	Enhance	Feb 22, 2023	Feb 22, 2023	Feb 22, 2023	CP	
Thief Simulator VR: Greenview Street	Simulation	3R Games	PlayWay	May 9, 2024	May 9, 2024	May 9, 2024	GD	
Thief VR: Legacy of Shadow	Stealth	Maze Theory; Eidos-Montréal	Vertigo Games	Dec 4, 2025	Dec 4, 2025	Dec 4, 2025		
Throw Your Phone (Into The Ocean)	Casual	Billy Laurain	Sandbar Studios	Aug 1, 2025	Aug 1, 2025	Aug 1, 2025		
Throwback	Action; Arcade	Look On Media	Look On Media	TBA	TBA	TBA		
Thumper	Rhythm	Drool	Drool	Feb 22, 2023	Feb 22, 2023	Feb 22, 2023		
Tier One: Direct Action	Shooter	Niorun Studios	Niorun Studios	TBA	TBA	TBA		
Tiger Blade	Action	Ikimasho	Big Sugar	Dec 20, 2023	Dec 20, 2023	Dec 20, 2023		
Timeless Heart VR	Rogue-Like	Team Chariot; John Jiang	FlamingExperienceVR	TBA	TBA	TBA		
Tin Hearts ‡	Puzzle	Rogue Sun	Wired Productions	Mar 14, 2024	Mar 14, 2024	Mar 14, 2024	GD	
Titan Isles	Adventure	Psytec Games	Psytec Games	Unreleased	Feb 24, 2026	Feb 24, 2026		
Titanic: A Space Between	Horror	Globiss Interactive	Globiss Interactive	TBA	TBA	TBA		
TOSS!	Casual; Sports; Platformer	Agera Games	Vertigo Games	Sep 7, 2023	Sep 7, 2023	Sep 7, 2023		
Towers & Powers	Strategy	Jetdogs Studios	VRKiwi	Dec 15, 2023	Dec 15, 2023	Dec 15, 2023		
Townsmen VR	Casual; Simulation; Strategy	HandyGames	HandyGames	Feb 22, 2023	Feb 22, 2023	Feb 22, 2023		
Toy Trains	Casual; Simulation	Something Random Games	Something Random Games	Jan 16, 2024	Jan 16, 2024	Jan 16, 2024		
Train Chase	Rail shooter	Rhine Games	Rhine Games	Unreleased	Feb 24, 2024	Feb 24, 2024		
Transformers Beyond Reality	First-person shooter	Meta4 Interactive	Meta4 Interactive	May 9, 2023	May 9, 2023	May 9, 2023	CB	
Travel The Words	Adventure; Puzzle	Studio 8ight	Studio 8ight	May 30, 2023	May 30, 2023	May 30, 2023	GD	
Trenches VR	Horror	Steelkrill Studio	Perp Games	Jan 20, 2026	Jan 20, 2026	Jan 20, 2026		
TRIPP: A New Way to Meditate	Casual	TRIPP LLC	TRIPP LLC	Jun 9, 2023	Jun 9, 2023	Jun 9, 2023		
Trombone Champ: Unflattened	Casual; Rhythm	Flat2VR Studios; Holy Wow Studios	Impact Reality	Nov 26, 2024	Nov 26, 2024	Nov 26, 2024		
The Twilight Zone VR	Horror	Pocket Money Games	Pocket Money Games	Mar 19, 2024	Mar 19, 2024	Mar 19, 2024		
Ultimate Knockout	Action	Straightjackit Entertainment	Straightjackit Entertainment	TBA	TBA	TBA		
Ultrawings 2	Action; Simulation	Bit Planet Games	Bit Planet Games	Jan 25, 2024	Jan 25, 2024	Jan 25, 2024		
Umami Grove	Adventure	Pomshine Games	DANGEN Entertainment	Jan 27, 2026	Jan 27, 2026	Jan 27, 2026		
Umurangi Generation VR	Simulation	Origame Digital	Origame Digital; Playism	Apr 18, 2024	Apr 18, 2024	Apr 18, 2024		
Undead Citadel	Action; Role-playing	Dark Curry	Dark Curry	Jun 26, 2025	Jun 26, 2025	Jun 26, 2025		
UNDERDOGS	Action; Fighting	One Hamsa	Perp Games	Mar 25, 2025	Mar 25, 2025	Mar 25, 2025		
Underworld Overseer	Strategy	Myron Games	Myron Games	TBA	TBA	TBA		
Unhidden: Cozy Hidden Object	Puzzle	Drukry	Drukry	Unreleased	Dec 16, 2024	Unreleased		
Unplugged - Air Guitar	Rhythm	Anotherway	Vertigo Games	Feb 22, 2023	Feb 22, 2023	Feb 22, 2023		
Until You Fall	Hack and Slash; Rogue-like	Schell Games	Schell Games	Jun 21, 2023	Jun 21, 2023	Jun 21, 2023		
The Utility Room	Adventure; Horror	Lionel Marsden	BinMan Games	Aug 28, 2024	Aug 28, 2024	Aug 28, 2024		
Vacation Simulator	Casual; Simulation	Owlchemy Labs	Owlchemy Labs	Feb 22, 2023	Feb 22, 2023	Feb 22, 2023	CB	
Vampire: The Masquerade – Justice	Adventure; Role-playing	Fast Travel Games	Fast Travel Games	Nov 2, 2023	Nov 2, 2023	Nov 2, 2023		
Vegas Infinite ‡	Casual	Lucky VR	Lucky VR	Unreleased	May 9, 2023	May 27, 2023		
Ven VR Adventure	Adventure; Platformer	Monologic Games	Monologic Games	Unreleased	Dec 18, 2023	Dec 18, 2023		
Vendetta Forever	Action; Shooter	MeatSpace Interactive	NDreams	Oct 24, 2024	Oct 24, 2024	Oct 24, 2024		
Vertigo 2	Action-adventure	Zack Tsiakalis-Brown	Perp Games; Zulubo Productions	Jan 15, 2024	Jan 15, 2024	Jan 15, 2024		
Vertigo Rush	Racing	Sumalab	Sumalab	TBA	TBA	TBA		
Vetrix Worlds	Casual; Puzzle	Vagabond	Vagabond	Dec 21, 2023	Dec 21, 2023	Dec 21, 2023		
Virtual Hunter	Action-adventure; Simulation	VRKiwi	VRKiwi	May 27, 2026	May 27, 2026	May 27, 2026		
Volcanic Core	Action; Arcade	Synthesis Universe	Synthesis Universe	TBA	TBA	TBA		
VR Skater	Sports; Simulation	DEFICIT Games	Perp Games	Aug 4, 2023	Aug 4, 2023	Aug 4, 2023		
VRacer Hoverbike	Racing	VertexBreakers	Impact Reality	Nov 4, 2025	Nov 4, 2025	Nov 4, 2025		
VRider SBK	Racing	Funny Tales	VRAL Games	Jun 27, 2025	Jun 27, 2025	Jun 27, 2025		
Walkabout Mini Golf	Sports; Casual	Mighty Coconut	Mighty Coconut	May 11, 2023	May 11, 2023	May 11, 2023	CP	
The Walking Dead: Saints & Sinners	First-person shooter; Survival Horror	Skybound Entertainment; Skydance Interactive	Skydance Interactive	Mar 20, 2023	Mar 21, 2023	Mar 21, 2023	CB (Note: Only the PSVR1 "Tourist edition" can be upgraded for PSVR2.)	
The Walking Dead: Saints & Sinners – Chapter 2: Retribution	First-person shooter; Survival Horror	Skybound Entertainment; Skydance Interactive	Skydance Interactive	Mar 20, 2023	Mar 21, 2023	Mar 21, 2023	CB (Note: Only the PSVR1 "Tourist edition" can be upgraded for PSVR2.)	
Wall Town Wonders	Casual; Simulation	Cyborn	Cyborn	May 7, 2025	May 7, 2025	May 7, 2025		
Wallace & Gromit in The Grand Getaway	Adventure	Aardman; Atlas V; No Ghost; Albyon	Astrea	Oct 21, 2025	Oct 21, 2025	Oct 21, 2025		
Waltz of the Wizard ‡	Action-adventure	Aldin Dynamics	Aldin Dynamics	Oct 3, 2023	Oct 3, 2023	Oct 3, 2023		
Wanderer: The Fragments of Fate	Adventure	Mighty Eyes	Mighty Eyes	Apr 3, 2025	Apr 3, 2025	Apr 3, 2025		
Wandering in Space Online VR	Action; Strategy	MOONSEER VR	MOONSEER VR	TBA	TBA	TBA		
WHAT THE BAT?	Casual; Simulation	Triband	Triband	Feb 22, 2023	Feb 22, 2023	Feb 22, 2023		
Whispers Of The Tarnished City	Action-adventure	Galvanic Freak	FTFS Studio	TBA	TBA	TBA		
Whitewater VR - Extreme Kayaking Adventure	Simulation	Fitnect Interactive	Fitnect Interactive	Oct 24, 2024	Oct 24, 2024	Oct 24, 2024		
Windlands 2	Action-adventure	Psytec Games	Psytec Games	Jul 25, 2024	Jul 25, 2024	Jul 25, 2024	CBCP	
The Wizards - Dark Times: Brotherhood	Action-adventure	Carbon Studio	Vertigo Games	Feb 22, 2024	Feb 22, 2024	Feb 22, 2024	CP	
Workshop Simulator VR	Casual; Simulation	VR Factory Games	VR Factory Games	Sep 4, 2025	Sep 4, 2025	Sep 4, 2025		
WRATH: Aeon of Ruin VR - Brutal Edition	First-person shooter	Flat2VR Studios; Team Beef; KillPixel Games; Slipgate Ironworks	Beyond Frames Entertainment	Apr 9, 2026	Apr 9, 2026	Apr 9, 2026		
X8	First-person shooter	Thirdverse	Thirdverse	TBA	TBA	TBA		
You, Calligrapher	Casual; Education	Patha Pradipa	LuciiDream	Sep 15, 2023	Sep 20, 2023	Sep 28, 2023		
Yupitergrad 2: The Lost Station	Action-adventure	Gamedust	Gamedust	TBA	TBA	TBA		
Zenith: Nexus	Massively multiplayer online role-playing game	RamenVR	RamenVR	Feb 22, 2023	Feb 22, 2023	Feb 22, 2023	CBCP	
Zero Caliber Remastered	First-person shooter	XREAL Games	XREAL Games	Dec 16, 2025	Dec 16, 2025	Dec 16, 2025		
Zero Caliber 2 Remastered	First-person shooter	XREAL Games	XREAL Games	Oct 2026	Oct 2026	Oct 2026		
Zombie Army VR	First-person shooter	XR Games	Rebellion Developments	Jun 12, 2025	Jun 12, 2025	Jun 12, 2025		
Zombie Bar Simulator	Casual; Simulation	VR Factory	VR Factory	Unreleased	Apr 19, 2024	Apr 19, 2024		
Zombieland: Headshot Fever Reloaded	First-person shooter	XR Games	XR Games; Sony Pictures Virtual Reality	Feb 22, 2023	Feb 22, 2023	Feb 22, 2023		

== See also ==
- List of PlayStation 5 games
- List of PlayStation VR games
- List of PlayStation applications
- List of Oculus Rift games
- List of Oculus Quest games
- List of HTC Vive games
