= Red Matter =

Red Matter may refer to:

- Red Matter (video game), a 2018 sci-fi virtual reality game developed and published by Spanish studio Vertical Robot
- Red matter (Star Trek), a fictitious red liquid material introduced in the 2009 film Star Trek
