= Chicken Police: Paint It Red! =

2020 video game

Chicken Police: Paint it Red!
- Developer: The Wild Gentlemen
- Publisher: HandyGames
- Director: Bálint Bánk Varga
- Producer: Tamás Bakó
- Designers: Bálint Bánk Varga; Tamás Bakó; Péter Nádas
- Programmers: Péter Nádas; Zsolt Várady
- Artists: Alex Johannes Kuster; Zoltán Ludas; Titanilla Pizvor; István Lovász
- Writer: Bálint Bánk Varga
- Composer: László Vincze
- Series: World of Wilderness
- Engine: Unity
- Platforms: Amazon Luna; Android; iOS; macOS; Nintendo Switch; PlayStation 4; PlayStation 5; Stadia; Windows; Xbox One; Xbox Series X/S
- Release: Windows, NS, PS4, XBO: WW: November 5, 2020; Android, iOS: WW: June 29, 2021; macOS: WW: November 4, 2021; Stadia: WW: December 6, 2021; PS5, XSX: WW: March 30, 2022; Amazon Luna: WW: October 20, 2022
- Genre: Adventure
- Mode: Single-player

Chicken Police: Paint it Red! (stylized as Chicken Police: Paint it RED!) is a point-and-click adventure game developed by The Wild Gentlemen. It was released by HandyGames on November 5, 2020 for multiple platforms. Players control a burnt-out cop who is investigating a crime in a city of anthropomorphic animals.

A sequel, subtitled Into the HIVE!, launched on November 7, 2024 on Windows and was published by Joystick Ventures. The sequel will eventually launch on PlayStation 4, PlayStation 5, Xbox Series X|S and Nintendo Switch as well. This game continues after the events of the first game and follows Sonny and Marty on a new case.

== Gameplay ==
Chicken Police is set in an alternate world populated by anthropomorphic animals that are generally depicted as humans with animal heads. Players control Sonny Featherland, a burnt-out cop with the head of a rooster. Sonny was formerly a celebrated hero but has become an alcoholic and is estranged from his former partner, Marty MacChicken. After being approached by a distraught woman, Sonny reunites with Marty to solve one last case before his retirement. The game is a point-and-click adventure game styled after 1940s film noir. Most of the game is in a stylistic monochrome, but colors are used sparingly for emphasis. Players look for clues, interview suspects, and eventually perform interrogations. When interrogating a suspect, a minigame determines their success. After being informed of personality quirks, players attempt to find a line of questioning that will exploit that suspect's personality. Poorly-chosen lines of interrogation can close off dialogue options and reduce how much of the story's background players learn, but this does not put the game in an unwinnable state.

== Development ==
The premise was inspired by a YouTube video in which two chickens appear to break up a fight between rabbits. To create the characters, The Wild Gentlemen started with human models in a studio and used Adobe Photoshop to change the heads to animals. Initially, the animal heads came from stock photography, but the developers found the images could be made more realistic-looking by taking their own photographs at wildlife parks and zoos. Some details were hand-drawn, and they made accessories, such as Bubo the owl's glasses, from scratch. The resulting images were then broken into textures and animated in Unity. Both classic adventure games and films noir were influences on the game. The relationship between the two cops is influenced by buddy cop films. The team often worked remotely and were spread across multiple countries.

Chicken Police was released on Microsoft Windows, PlayStation 4, Nintendo Switch, and Xbox One on November 5, 2020, iOS and Android on June 29, 2021, macOS on November 4 and Google Stadia in December 6 of the same year. Next-gen ports were released on March 30, 2022 and it was also released on Amazon Luna on October 20 of the same year.

== Reception ==
Reception

Aggregate score
Aggregator	Score				
Aggregator	iOS	NS	PC	PS4	Xbox One
Metacritic	N/A	83/100	82/100	84/100	83/100

Review scores
Publication	Score				
Publication	iOS	NS	PC	PS4	Xbox One
Adventure Gamers			3.5/5		
Hardcore Gamer		4/5			
Nintendo Life		9/10			
RPGFan	82/100				

Laura Cress of Adventure Gamers praised the game's voice acting, graphics, and story, though she said it has "too many unnecessary mini-games". Hardcore Gamer's reviewer, Chris Shive, similarly criticized the minigames while praising the noir atmosphere. Writing for Nintendo Life, Stuart Gipp called it "a polished, captivating experience" and said it was one of the best adventure games on the Switch. Luke Kemp of PC Gamer called it "one of the most surreal experiences of my life" and praised the writing and acting. Caitlin Argyros wrote in her review for RPGfan that the mystery has an "abrupt and not quite satisfying" conclusion, but she enjoyed the writing nonetheless. Christopher Byrd wrote in The Washington Post, "In my tiny pantheon of visual novel/adventure games, Chicken Police - Paint it Red has a spot."

== Sequel ==
In June 2023, The Wild Gentlemen announced its sequel, titled Chicken Police: Into the HIVE!, for Microsoft Windows. Published by Joystick Ventures, the sequel was released on November 7, 2024.

Building upon the foundation of the first game, Chicken Police: Into the HIVE! promised to delve deeper into the world of Chicken Police by venturing into the Hive.

== Speedrunning ==
Chicken Police: Paint It RED! has a small speedrunning community with leaderboards hosted on Speedrun.com. Categories listed include Any% with and without skips; as of February 2026, the fastest verified Any% (Skips) time shown is 12:49 on PC by blathersheart, and the fastest verified Any% (No skips) time shown is 19:47 on PC. Notably, the username AdamAlexChicken4Eva is credited by the community with “starting” the game’s speedrunning scene by submitting the first recorded run and kicking off wider participation. A verified PlayStation 4 Any% (No skips) run of 45:20 was submitted under the username AdamAlexChicken4Eva.
