= Truth or Lies =

2010 video game

- Developers: Big Ant Studios; Imagination Entertainment; HandyGames (iPhone only)
- Publisher: THQ
- Director: Mike Merren
- Producer: Rita Cavanagh
- Platforms: Xbox 360; PlayStation 3 Wii; IOS
- Release: NA: September 14, 2010; AU: November 4, 2010; EU: November 19, 2010
- Genres: Party, Trivia (iPhone only)
- Modes: Multiplayer, Single-Player (iPhone only)

Truth or Lies is a 2010 party video game that uses a microphone peripheral to score players on their response to in-game questions. The game was developed by Big Ant Studios and published by THQ for the Xbox 360, PlayStation 3, and Wii. A version for iPhone with the same name released and was published by HandyGames under their parent company THQ on February 15, 2011.

== Gameplay ==
The main game mode has 5 categories; kids, teens, adults, couples, and families, each changing what types of questions are asked. There are 3 game length options, short, medium, and long, changing the number of questions asked per round. There are 3 rounds per game with each player answering a set number of questions per round. There are more than 3,000 unique questions throughout the game categories. The game listens to the player's voice through the Xbox 360 Wireless Microphone or Logitech USB Microphone respectively, using voice calibration to determine if the audio is a truth or lie. The player is awarded anywhere between 0 and 1,000 points. At the end of each round, the announcer scores all players based on the number of points earned. At the end of the third and final round, all the points are accumulated as the announcer ranks each player from last to first, giving them a ranking on how well they performed. Hot Seat is an additional mode without the narrator asking questions. The mode is intended for players in the room to ask each other questions, with the game only deciding if players told a truth or lie, awarding points without determining a winner.

== Reception ==
Truth or Lies

Aggregate score
| Aggregator | Score | | |
| Aggregator | PS3 | Wii | Xbox 360 |
|---|---|---|---|
| Metacritic | N/A | N/A | 28/100 |

Review scores
| Publication | Score | | |
| Publication | PS3 | Wii | Xbox 360 |
|---|---|---|---|
| Eurogamer | 1/10 | N/A | N/A |
| IGN | 4/10 | 4/10 | 4/10 |
| NGamer | N/A | 10/100 | N/A |
| Official Xbox Magazine (UK) | N/A | N/A | 20/100 |
| Official Xbox Magazine (US) | N/A | N/A | 25/100 |
| Xbox 360 World Magazine | N/A | N/A | 13/100 |

The game received "generally unfavorable" reviews according to the review aggregator website Metacritic. The Xbox 360 version has an aggregate score of 28 out of 100.

IGN's Kristine Steimer rated Truth or Lies a 4/10, with a persistent point being "It would be an interesting game if it actually worked." None of the questions made her uncomfortable as she expected, but she did applaud the game for presenting unique questions for each category. "Unfortunately, regardless of whether or not you calibrate at the beginning the technology doesn't work consistently, making the experience more annoying than fun", writing further, "It got to the point where I had no idea whether or not my response was going to be scored correctly." She described the Hot Seat mode "kind of pointless" due to the inconsistent technology and the people around you creating the questions. To summarize the review, Kristine suggests "Save your 40 bucks, buy a few bottles of wine and play good old fashioned Truth or Dare with your friends instead", giving the game its final bad ranking.

GamingXP rated the Xbox 360 version a 56/100, while the PS3 release received a 35/100. The author criticized the microphone usage and how it does not work reliably, while noting that "The idea behind the game, however, was a good one", it merely lacked proper execution.

Official Xbox Magazine rated Truth or Lies a 25/100. "Yapping lies into a mic is a unique and creative idea, but Truth or Lies never works like it should" writing why there is no reason to play it unless you want to earn easy Xbox achievements. Official Xbox Magazine UK similarly rated the game a 20/100. The author highlights the bland, non-sexy questions they were asked throughout their playthrough, declaring that "You'd have an edgier evening playing Monopoly." The Xbox 360 World Magazine rated the game 13/100, writing about how the microphone calibration feature is ultimately "A lie detector that doesn't detect lies" and a pointless video game.

Nintendo Gamer exclusively reviewed the Nintendo Wii version, rating it a 10/100. The author wrote the following; "We'd rather undergo a CIA interrogation than play this again", relating the microphone game mechanic to real-life interrogations. This game is within the top 10 lowest rated Nintendo Gamer reviews on the Wii, in addition to being on the top 20 list for lowest rated reviews regardless of the platform.

Eurogamer Sweden rated the PS3 version a 1/10, making it one of the lowest scoring games they have ever reviewed. The author stated "There's no reason to buy this game, or for it to even exist, as the only thing it brings to the table is to interpret if the player is telling the truth or a lie", emphasizing how the decision between a truth and lie is done "haphazardly". This is among four of Eurogamer Sweden's worst rated video games with Afterfall: InSanity, Amy, and Family Party: 30 Great Games Obstacle Arcade similarly receiving a 1/10.
