= Through the Darkest of Times =

2020 video game

- Developer: Paintbucket Games
- Publisher: HandyGames
- Platforms: Windows; macOS; Android; iOS; Xbox One; Nintendo Switch; PlayStation 4
- Release: Windows, macOS; 30 January 2020; Android, iOS; 7 May 2020; Nintendo Switch, Xbox One, PlayStation 4; 13 August 2020
- Genre: Strategy
- Mode: Single-player

Through the Darkest of Times is a strategy video game developed by Paintbucket Games and published by HandyGames. It was released on Microsoft Windows and macOS on 30 January 2020 and later on other platforms. The game follows a resistance group in Nazi Germany from Adolf Hitler's rise in power in 1933 to the end of World War II and manages each member through weekly missions and acts of sabotage.

Through the Darkest of Times was developed by Jörg Friedrich and Sebastian Schulz in three years. It was the first game to be published in Germany that allowed Nazi symbols, including the swastika. It received mixed critical reception, with the storytelling being held in high regard and the simple strategy being heavily criticized. A sequel was released in March 2025 titled The Darkest Files.

== Gameplay ==
Through the Darkest of Times is a single-player strategy video game. The player begins as a resistance leader of a randomized background in 1933 Germany, when Hitler is initially appointed as Chancellor. Members of the resistance group complete missions to disrupt the Nazi regime, with some involving sabotaging equipment, spreading leaflets, and painting walls with messages. Certain missions are made easier or harder based on attributes and backgrounds of each resistance member, or what items are required. Depending on the risk, suspicion, or traits of resistance members, missions may have higher risk of failure, or result in arrest or death by the Gestapo. Other missions may not unlock until prerequisite ones are completed, with a few larger objectives requiring multiple prerequisite steps to complete.

The game takes place over four chapters, with the chapters lasting twenty weeks in its own time period within the Nazi regime. Each week represents one turn and round of missions. Supplies, supporters, and morale are reset at the beginning of each chapter. Historically accurate newspaper clippings are presented at the start of each turn, with made-up titles. Between different turns and at the start of chapters, scenes and dialogue trees are given to the player, featuring major historical events or interactions with everyday citizens.

The choices made do not change the actual outcome of any major events surrounding Nazi Germany, but may influence later events in the game. The initial objective is to survive until the end of World War II and resist against the Nazi regime as much as possible. Subsequent plays allow for alternative historical events to take place.

== Development and release ==
The developers of Paintbucket Games, Jörg Friedrich and Sebastian Schulz, initially met at Yager Development and began planning a historical game in 2017. The game was announced in April 2018 with funding from Medienboard Berlin-Brandenburg and publishing agreements between Paintbucket Games and HandyGames were confirmed on 29 October 2018. Through the Darkest of Times is the first game published in Germany that is allowed to depict the swastika, after industry regulator USK lifted its previous restrictions on Nazi imagery within games (derived from statute StGB § 86a). Paintbucket Games received approval after submitting a demo to the USK at Gamescom on 17 August 2018. Its art style was inspired by 1920s German expressionism.

Adaptations for iOS, Android, Xbox One, Nintendo Switch, and PlayStation 4 were released over the course of 2020. The Android release was open for pre-registration as early as April 2020, and both it and the iOS version were released on 7 May 2020. The adaptations for Nintendo Switch, PlayStation 4, and Xbox One were released on 13 August 2020. Stadia released a version of Through the Darkest of Times on 1 June 2022.

== Reception ==
Professional ratings
Aggregate scores
Source	Rating
Metacritic	71/100
Review scores
Source	Rating
PC Gamer	87/100
Screen Rant	4/5
GameSpot	8/10
The Guardian	5/5
TheGamer	3/5

Through the Darkest of Times received mixed reviews, and has been compared to games like This War of Mine and Papers, Please. On Metacritic it has a score of 71 out of 100 based on reviews from 24 critics. The storytelling was overall highly regarded, but critics felt that the story was too rigid, and that the strategy choices did not impact the story enough. Its low replay value was also heavily criticized, with gameplay being characterized by reviewers as repetitive.

Peter Morics writing for Screen Rant enjoyed the randomized aspects of characters, but found the lack of choice in gender and occupation to be less than ideal. He complimented the art style, saying "the art style complements the anxious, strained world of your resistance leader marvelously." When it was announced, Rick Lane, from PC Gamer, felt that the art style was distasteful and said it "looks like something from a Russian cartoonist’s nightmares." Luke Kemp, also from PC Gamer, criticized the comparisons and especially noted the references to Donald Trump, saying "it really isn't necessary". Simon Parkin of The Guardian wrote that the newspapers given to the player at the start of each turn have "meticulous historical accuracy" but that the game sometimes "clumsily" made comparisons to modern day events and that there was an "inevitable simplification" of the effects of activism.

TheGamer reviewer Tanner Fox found the simplicity of the strategy as lacking from what "most would expect from a full PC release" and commented that the game would be better suited as a mobile game. Other reviewers noted low replay value, citing repetitive results and dialogues. The interluding events were criticized as having little impact to the main story, and David Wildgoose from GameSpot lamented the lack of integration between storytelling and strategy choices within the game, saying that "there's a frustrating lack of specificity".

A debate sparked across Germany over the decision to allow Nazi symbols by the USK. Franziska Giffey, former Minister of Family Affairs, initially criticized its usage, saying "You don't play with swastikas," but later posted on Facebook in support of the USK's decision. Klaus-Peter Sick, a historian, rebutted by saying "One doesn't become a Nazi just by seeing a swastika".

Through the Darkest of Times was nominated for the category of Games for Impact in The Game Awards 2020.

== Sequel ==
A sequel, titled The Darkest Files, was released on 26 March 2025.
