= Little Big Workshop =

2019 video game

- Developer: Mirage Game Studios
- Publisher: HandyGames
- Designers: Simon Röjder; Joakim Antonsson
- Programmers: Victor Ulhagen; Christian Grahn; Sven-Åke Eklund
- Artists: Joel Landberg; Tobias Karlsson
- Composers: Joakim Antonsson; Joakim Karlberg
- Platforms: Windows; macOS; PlayStation 4; Xbox One; Nintendo Switch; Apple TV; Google Stadia
- Release: 17 October 2019; PlayStation 4, Xbox One; 24 September 2020; Nintendo Switch; 1 October 2020; Stadia; 6 November 2020
- Genre: Construction and management simulation
- Mode: Single-player

Little Big Workshop is a 2019 construction and management simulation video game developed by Mirage Game Studios and published by HandyGames. The player manages a factory, planning the production and overseeing their workforce whilst dealing with disruptions from a rival CEO. It was released on Windows, macOS, PlayStation 4, Nintendo Switch, Xbox One, and Apple TV. Upon release, the game received positive reviews on Microsoft Windows and mixed reviews on Xbox One.

== Gameplay ==
Little Big Workshop is a construction and management simulation video game in which the player designs and manages their own factory to produce various goods. The final aim is to create the most successful and efficient factory possible. The player plans products via a blueprint menu where they can designate which processes are placed on what workbenches. This is also where the player has to meet the certain quality levels for products, which may involve using more expensive materials. The player has to manage workers to ensure they do not get overworked by using break rooms. Research and development points can be unlocked by meeting certain goal thresholds. These points can be used to unlock advancements like more materials, better deals with clients, specialist workers which increase efficiency on specific material processes (i.e. wood specialists increase speed of which wood processes occur), and additional tiers of production. The computer-controlled CEO of Nemesis Incorporated will sometimes disrupt the player's production by manipulating the market or dispatching spies.

== Development and release ==
Little Big Workshop was developed by Swedish developer Mirage Game Studios and published by HandyGames. Mirage consists of eleven developers. The game was released on Windows and macOS on 17 October 2019. It was released on the PlayStation 4 and Xbox One on 24 September 2020 and on Nintendo Switch on 1 October. It was also released on Google Stadia.

== Reception ==
Reception

Aggregate score
Aggregator	Score
Metacritic	Windows: 77/100; XB1: 62/100

Review scores
Publication	Score
Screen Rant	3/5 (XB1)
The Digital Fix	9/10 (Win)

Little Big Workshop received "generally favorable reviews" for Microsoft Windows and "Mixed or average reviews" for Xbox One based on eleven and six reviews, respectively.

The Digital Fix's Dan Phillips praised the art style. Nathan P. Gibson of Screen Rant concurred saying the graphics are "cute and colorful"

Gibson praised the acoustic soundtrack as "soothing".

Gibson opined that it is a "relaxing" title for "sim fans looking for a break or consumers who want a more casual, relaxing title to sink hours into". Phillips was critical of the tutorial for not providing the player with enough guidance.
