= PowerBeatsVR =

2020 virtual reality fitness video game

- Developer: Five Mind Creations UG (haftungsbeschränkt)
- Publisher: Five Mind Creations UG (haftungsbeschränkt)
- Engine: Unity
- Platforms: Microsoft Windows; Meta Quest; PlayStation 5 (PlayStation VR2)
- Release: Microsoft Windows: WW: 18 November 2020; Meta Quest: WW: 9 February 2023; PlayStation 5: WW: 15 December 2024
- Genres: Rhythm; Fitness
- Mode: Single-player

PowerBeatsVR is a rhythm-based virtual reality fitness game developed and published by the Munich studio Five Mind Creations. It entered early access on Steam in April 2019 and was released for Microsoft Windows VR via Steam on 18 November 2020. Versions for the official Meta Quest store and for PlayStation VR2 on PlayStation 5 followed on 9 February 2023 and 15 December 2024, respectively.

The game has been noted by specialist outlets for its fitness-oriented design and music-driven workouts.

== Gameplay ==
Specialist outlets describe PowerBeatsVR as a music-driven exercise game that uses full-body movement. Players strike incoming objects and move around obstacles in time with music; scoring is based on timing and movement intensity. Coverage ahead of the Quest release listed features including an auto-generated workout mode, calorie tracking, online leaderboards, multiple environments, and a VR level editor that supports live recording.

== Development ==
Five Mind Creations developed and self-published the game using the Unity engine. An early access version launched on Steam on 18 April 2019, followed by a full Windows release on 18 November 2020; a Quest version initially appeared on App Lab in 2021 before release on the official store on 9 February 2023. A PlayStation 5 version supporting PlayStation VR2 launched in December 2024.

Early write-ups listed the game among new VR releases in April 2019, and during early access it was noted for adding custom songs and a level editor.

== Reception ==
Specialist coverage has framed PowerBeatsVR primarily as a fitness-focused rhythm title. In 2019, GamingRespawn compared it with other rhythm games and recommended it to players seeking a workout-oriented option. In 2020, Impulse Gamer recommended the title for its workout intensity. Prior to the Quest version's release, Road to VR outlined the feature set, including an auto-generator, calorie tracking, and the level editor. After the Quest store launch, CGMagazine described it as a practical at-home workout choice within VR. The title also appeared as a finalist in VR Fitness Insider’s 2020 awards.

== Availability and promotions ==
The game has been included in Quest store sale roundups by MIXED in 2023 and 2024.

== Downloadable content ==
- Custom Environments (12 July 2022) — panoramic environments with user-supplied skyboxes. Available on Steam, Meta Quest, and PlayStation 5 (PS VR2).
- Song Pack 3 (1 February 2024) — twelve additional music tracks. Available on Steam, Meta Quest, and PlayStation 5 (PS VR2).
- Disco Environment (27 August 2025) — themed stage. Available on Steam and Meta Quest; regional PlayStation Store availability may vary.

== See also ==
- Exergaming
- Virtual reality game
