= Townsmen =

- Developer: HandyGames
- Publishers: Handygames; Gamevil (Note: Townsmen 4, US only); Disney Mobile Studios (Note: Townsmen 5); Headup Games (Note: Townsmen (2012), Windows); Netflix (Note: A Kingdom Rebuilt, Android and iOS)
- Platforms: Java (Note: Townsmen 1–6); Android (Note: Townsmen (2012), Townsmen: A Kingdom Rebuilt); iOS (Note: Townsmen (2012), Townsmen: A Kingdom Rebuilt); Windows (Note: Townsmen (2012), Townsmen VR, Townsmen: A Kingdom Rebuilt); PlayStation 4 (Note: Townsmen: A Kingdom Rebuilt); Xbox One (Note: Townsmen: A Kingdom Rebuilt); PlayStation 5 (Note: Townsmen VR, with PlayStation VR2)
- First release: Townsmen; 2004
- Latest release: Townsmen: A Kingdom Rebuilt; 2019

Townsmen is a city-building video game series developed and published by HandyGames. They generally have feudal settings, and some include combat. The first six games were Java-based. Later entries were released for more platforms, including Windows, PlayStation 5, Android, and iOS, and they do not have any combat.

== Townsmen (2004) ==
The first game in the series was published in September 2004. It is a city-building game similar to the SimCity series and is played on a single screen. IGN called it a "pleasant little surprise" that "offers hours of play", though they criticized the lack of in-game help screens. GameSpot recommended it to people who enjoy complex games, though they called its controls "virtually impenetrable".

== Townsmen 2 ==
After declaring their independence from a corrupt kingdom, players build up their town, gather resources, and construct tools. IGN said that for those willing to put into the effort necessary for the micromanagement and difficulty, it "could be quite a rewarding experience". It was released in Europe in December 2004.

== Townsmen 3 ==
Depending on the hardware, Townsmen 3 includes up to 14 missions. As players build up their town, they can choose either friendly or hostile actions with other settlements. This choice affects what bonuses they get. Pocket Gamer said it is "one of the best resource management sims available on mobile", though they criticized the balance of the bonuses received, which they said were weighted toward hostility. GamePro said every mobile gamer should own it.

== Townsmen 4 ==
Players control a monk in charge of improving a small town. Players are given objectives, which they can then complete as they see fit. Pocket Gamer called it "a mobile strategy classic" for what they felt was complex gameplay that rivaled that of Windows games. It was released in Europe in March 2007, and a deal with Gamevil to publish it in the United States was signed in December 2008, after Townsmen 5 had been released.

== Townsmen 5 ==
Players control a robber baron in a feudal fantasy land. They are opposed by a wizard, who players must defeat in combat after making their town prosperous. It was the first Townsmen game to be published by Disney Mobile Studios and was released in January 2008. According to Pocket Gamer's analysis, Townsmen 5 was the highest rated mobile game on five sites (including their own) for the first three months of 2008. In their review, Pocket Gamer said Townsman 5 is "great fun and dangerously engrossing".

== Townsmen 6 ==
The sixth entry is set in revolutionary France. Amid the city-building aspects, players must also fend off attacks by the King of France, who believes the player's town to be fomenting rebellion. It was released in July 2009. Pocket Gamer called it the best so far and "a complete triumph".

== Townsmen (2012) ==
The 2012 reboot is free-to-play on iOS and Android. Compared to the previous Java-based games, it removes combat. Pocket Gamer said the freemium model made it unenjoyable. They later said that it had not initially impressed them, but years of support made it one of the best city-building games on mobile devices. Headup Games published it on Windows in November 2016. GameStar said the Windows version is a good port but recommended that advanced users play a more complex game.

== Townsmen VR ==
Townsmen VR was released in February 2018 for Windows, using HTC Vive and Occulus Rift. It was released for PlayStation VR2 in January 2023. It was nominated for best technical achievement and the Cologne special prize for innovation at the Deutscher Entwicklerpreis and received positive reviews on Metacritic. In a roundup of the best VR games for the PlayStation 5, Sports Illustrated said it has awkward controls but "shows the potential of the god game genre in VR".

== Townsmen: A Kingdom Rebuilt ==
Townsmen: A Kingdom Rebuilt received mixed reviews on Metacritic. It was released on the Nintendo Switch in November 2018. Nintendo World Report called the Switch version "wonderfully complex" despite looking like generic mobile game. Digitally Downloaded said the scenarios were better than expected, but they called it "a complete misfire" for fans of sandbox games. A Windows version was released in 2019. Owners of the 2016 Windows version of Townsmen on Steam received it for free. It was published by Netflix for Android and iOS in May 2022. These versions require a current Netflix subscription, but Netflix subscribers can play it for free. It is also available for PlayStation 4 and Xbox One.
