= Ghostbusters: Rise of the Ghost Lord =

2023 video game

- Developer: nDreams
- Publisher: Sony Pictures Virtual Reality
- Series: Ghostbusters
- Platforms: Meta Quest 2; Meta Quest 3; Meta Quest Pro; PlayStation VR2
- Release: October 26, 2023
- Genre: Action-adventure
- Modes: Single-player, multiplayer

Ghostbusters: Rise of the Ghost Lord is a 2023 virtual reality video game based on the Ghostbusters franchise developed by nDreams and published by Sony Pictures Virtual Reality for the Meta Quest 2, Meta Quest 3, Meta Quest Pro and the PlayStation VR2.

== Synopsis ==
The game is set in San Francisco and features locations from the city such as the Golden Gate Bridge. The game follows a new team of Ghostbusters who work together to stop the Ghost Lord and his minions. A story trailer released in May 2023 revealed that the game's story would have story elements related to the 1984 Ghostbusters film involving Gustav Hookfaber, who was an understudy for the Ghostbusters at Columbia University.

== Plot ==
It is modern day, San Francisco. The head of California Ghostbusters, Gabriela, receives notification of a ‘PKE spike’ at the home of San Francisco resident and philanthropist, Gustav Hookfaber. Since there hasn’t been a ghost sighting in San Francisco for decades the city Ghostbusters HQ is empty and there’s no one to attend, so Gabriela contacts local conspiracist and host of ‘Strange Times Radio’ show ‘Big T’ to put out a call to his followers. Whoever replied went to investigate the mansion but was scared off and left all of Gabriela’s equipment in the mansion.

The game begins with Gabriela asking Big T if he can send another volunteer, this time to retrieve the equipment. Although the PKE spike disappeared long ago, there’s an urgency to collect the equipment before Gustav Hookfaber gets home and reports her for trespass. The player is one of Big T’s followers and answers the ad.

Gustav Hookfaber is an inventor and pioneer of clean energy. He has made a fortune for the city and is revered and loved. There’s due to be an exhibition about his life on the Golden Gate Bridge. No-one knows how he has produced such efficient energy, even those in his flagship factory where they manufacture energy compound.

The player begins the game as a courier and enters the mansion to locate the equipment. They find the PKE meter which leads them downstairs where the power trips. They then find the ghost trap and quickly use it to trap a ghost; the first ghost sighting in San Francisco for decades.

The player discovers Hookfaber’s dead body. It seems that something has killed him and it’s still in the mansion.

The player discovers Hookfaber’s laboratory and then locates Gabriela’s proton pack in a room where it’s clear he has been collecting ghosts in a Harvester machine. Gabriela thinks this could be why there hasn’t been any ghost sightings in the city. The Harvester malfunctions and the player has to fight some ghosts. Then the machine explodes and releases the Ghost Lord; a giant ghost with a skull face, wielding a particle throwing staff. The player survives when another girl ghost appears from the machine wielding a proton wand which attacks the Ghost Lord, although he defeats her before escaping through the roof.

The player goes back to the San Francisco HQ to fix the proton wand that was broken during the encounter with the Ghost Lord. The television news reports sightings of the Ghost Lord as well as giant cracks in the ground appearing across the city. Gabriela speaks with Big T who says it’s ‘the end times in the Bay’. Since Gabriela is so far away and the player survived the encounter in the mansion, she suggests that they put on some ‘new threads’ and go and investigate the calls being received; the first is from Gustav’s factory. Meanwhile Big T asks his followers if anyone else is available to help.

The player visits Gustav’s factory where they discover the secret to his clean energy compound; he’s harvesting and torturing ghosts to get ECTO energy. The player discovers the spectral activity in the factory and defeats it.

By the time they return to the HQ there are other volunteers already there and now they have a ragtag group of Ghostbusters to take on the Ghost Lord.

As the player completes missions so Gabriela and Big T study the footage from the mansion and try to work out what the Ghost Lord is and how to defeat him. They discover a prophecy called ‘The March of the Malevolent’ about the coming of a Ghost Lord which would create the first undead city on earth in San Francisco. Gustav Hookfaber was aware of this prophecy and feared the Ghost Lord coming.

A city municipal officer called Ronald Petnik frequently tells the Ghostbusters to stop damaging the city locations that they are visiting, especially the ones that concerned Gustav Hookfaber who he thinks was a city hero. He says that Gustav restored and rebuilt Chinatown and the city sewers after accidents there in the past. Gabriela is suspicious that wherever Gustav was, there was suffering.

Gabriela believes that the ghost girl from the mansion may be the spirit of a missing student ‘Katie’ who idolised Hookfaber and was an intern at his company. The player experiences hallucinations where they hear that Katie had the ability to commune with spirits which is why Gustav picked her for internship, later using her to help him terrorise ghosts and exploit them more for energy. Eventually Gustav turned his experiments onto ‘the living’ and Katie was imprisoned by him. In Katie’s attempts to escape she killed herself and Gustav; their spirits then being caught inside Gustav’s harvester machine.

Gabriela keeps promising to drive to the city to help the players but is regularly interrupted by ghostbusting jobs elsewhere in the state.

Gabriela and Big T realise that Gustav’s spirit has become the Ghost Lord whilst contained inside the Harvester, corrupted by all the dark PKE it had generated. They speculate that the Ghost Lord’s summoning staff, used to control the spirits, could be used to control him, and they send the player and any other available ghostbusters back to the mansion to retrieve a prototype staff.

The players return to the mansion and retrieve the prototype staff, connecting it to ECTO-1 and directing it towards the Ghost Lord who returns to the mansion to attack the players. However the staff fails to hurt the Ghost Lord and instead only makes him grow larger. The Ghost Lord says that this was his plan all along and he led the Ghostbusters to the staff that’s been hidden from him. As he grows, he invites the players to join him and witness the ‘March of the Malevolent’.

The players are teleported to the Golden Gate bridge where the Ghost Lord is now taller than the bridge itself. Gabriela has finally made it back to the city and is in the ECTO-1 looking for the players. Then she drives onto the bridge and arrives on the scene with the staff. Ronald Petnik arrives on the scene, not seeing the Ghost Lord, to finally shut down the Ghostbusters, only for the Ghost Lord to pick him up and throw him into the sea. Big T asks incredulously if Gabriela wants to make the Ghost Lord even bigger since she's brought the staff that grew him. Gabriela recalibrates the staff and manages to damage the Ghost Lord’s helmet so the players can use their proton wands to remove his eyes. Then Gabriela suggests they cross the streams; players and Gabriela firing together at the Ghost Lord to destroy him. They succeed.

Back at the HQ Gabriela tells the players they succeeded and are now genuine Ghostbusters. Ronald Petnik appears having survived the bridge attack and apologises to the Ghostbusters. Ray Stanz calls Gabriela and congratulates the team, warning of a future ‘super surge’. The players are left to continue running the San Francisco office, mopping up the outbreaks that the Ghost Lord caused.

== Gameplay ==
Ghostbusters: Rise of the Ghost Lord is an action-adventure single-player and multiplayer virtual reality video game. The game can be played with up to four players and includes many familiar elements from the Ghostbusters franchise including, PKE meters, proton packs, and Mini-Pufts, as seen in Ghostbusters: Afterlife. Players will also be able to upgrade their equipment and customize their character's outfit.
