= The Light Brigade (video game) =

2023 video game

- Developer: Funktronic Labs
- Publisher: Funktronic Labs
- Engine: Unity
- Platforms: Meta Quest 2, PlayStation VR2, Microsoft Windows
- Release: February 22, 2023 (early access)
- Genres: First-person shooter, roguelike, virtual reality
- Mode: Single-player

The Light Brigade is a video game developed and published by American studio Funktronic Labs. The player controls a member of the titular Light Brigade as they fight to free their world from corrupted forces. The Light Brigade released in early access during February 2023 for PlayStation VR2, Meta Quest 2 and Microsoft Windows.

== Gameplay ==
The player can see their health and ammo counters to the left of their weapon.

The Light Brigade is a first-person roguelike in which the player inhabits a character with an eternal spirit, allowing them to return after each death. Using an arsenal of World War II weaponry, the player can take on enemy soldiers in order to make their way through each level. The player can pray in order to open doors and interact with objects. Movement in the game is controlled by teleporting, characterized in game as a dash. At the beginning of each run, the player can choose between eight classes, each with different spells and weapons: scout, pistoleer, rifleman, assault, militia, sniper, breacher, engineer and hunter. Spells can be cast, with different effects like creating a shield in front of the player or dealing poison damage to opponents. When the player's health dwindles to zero, they have two chances to take back their body before the run ends.

== Development ==
The title was inspired by Dark Souls and its focus on ruined worlds that the player explored. A simpler art style was chosen to be less graphically demanding to run on Meta Quest 2. One of the cofounders remarked on how designing Light Brigade for Meta's hardware came with tradeoffs, "'It's kind of been a weird timeline where VR went up [in quality], and then dipped down when everyone bailed on the high-end for the Quest... But on the other side of that, the user base for the Quest is enormous, and that's what let us build something of the scale of The Light Brigade. We probably couldn't have if there was not that big an audience for it".

== Reception ==
Reception

Aggregate score
Aggregator	Score
Metacritic	(PS5) 79/100

Review scores
Publication	Score
NME	4/5
Road to VR	8.5/10

NME enjoyed the class system, writing that it forced the player to "make tough choices about what to develop". Road to VR liked the gunplay, but felt that the lack of melee was a missed opportunity.
