= THQ Nordic Mobile =

German video game developer

THQ Nordic Mobile GmbH
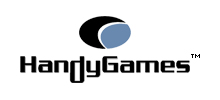
- Formerly: HandyGames (2000–2026)
- Type: Subsidiary
- Industry: Video games
- Founded: April 25, 2000; 26 years ago
- Founders: Christopher Kassulke; Markus Kassulke; Udo Bausewein
- Headquarters: Giebelstadt, Germany
- Products: Townsmen
- Number of employees: 80 (2024)
- Parent: THQ Nordic (2018–present)
- Subsidiaries: Massive Miniteam; HandyGames Studios
- Website: thqnordicmobile.com

THQ Nordic Mobile GmbH (formerly HandyGames) is a German video game developer and publisher based in Giebelstadt. In July 2018, the company was acquired by THQ Nordic.

== History ==
The company was founded in 2000 by brothers Christopher and Markus Kassulke along with Udo Bausewein. In 2006, HandyGames released its first free, ad-funded game and began the gradual transition to a largely ad-funded business model. Since 2010, all new HandyGames mobile titles are either free or freemium. By 2014 HandyGames had 150,000 app downloads per month and more than 100 million downloads in total. They have developed all the Townsmen games.

In 2012, HandyGames expanded onto other platforms like PC or Smart TVs. In January 2014 and 2015, the company were main sponsors for the "HandyGames Charity Day" in Würzburg, which aimed to raise funds for cancer research. On both occasions the event was able to raise roughly 50000 Euros.

HandyGames was one of the first companies to launch games for wearable technology in 2014. The games are compatible with Android Wear devices, including the Moto 360 by Motorola, the Huawei Watch, the Sony SmartWatch and the LG G Watch.

The company began developing VR (virtual reality) games 2015 and released titles like "Hidden Temple – VR Adventure". They can be played in 360° mode or in VR using one of the supported head-mounted displays like Oculus Rift, Samsung Gear VR, or Google Cardboard. Simultaneously, HandyGames began developing games for the Eighth generation of video game consoles like the PlayStation 4, Xbox One or later the Nintendo Switch.

Developer interview livestream

On 9 July 2018, THQ Nordic announced that it had acquired HandyGames and all of its intellectual property. THQ Nordic said that the studio management and all employees remain with the company.

Townsmen Expeditions (working title), which will mark the most recent entry in the Townsmen IP, received €150,000 development funding from Creative Europe. As of 2020, HandyGames employs 60 people.

In May 2021, Embracer Group announced the acquisition of Massive Miniteam by HandyGames, which will be fully integrated within the HandyGames organization, under the operative group THQ Nordic.

In August 2026, THQ Nordic announced the rebrand of HandyGames into THQ Nordic Mobile. Under this new name the company will focus on bringing console games into mobile devices. At the same time, THQ Nordic Mobile’s internal development team in Giebelstadt, Germany will continue its operations under the new name HandyGames Studios, focusing on original game development and supporting THQ Nordic Mobile ports.

== Awards ==
- Deutscher Entwicklerpreis — Bestes Studio (Best German Studio)

== Games ==
Title	Platform	Release date	Developer	Ref.
Townsmen	Java	2003	HandyGames	
Townsmen	Android	August 3, 2013	HandyGames	
Townsmen	Nintendo Switch	November 9, 2018	HandyGames	
Townsmen 2	Java	2003	HandyGames	
Townsmen 3	Java	2005	HandyGames	
Sexy Puzzle 2	Java	2006	HandyGames	
Porn Manager	Java	2006	HandyGames	
Bulldozer Inc.	Java	2006	HandyGames	
Townsmen 4	Java	2007	HandyGames	
Porn Manager 2	Java	2007	HandyGames	
Townsmen 5	Java	2008	HandyGames	
The Egyptians	Java	2008	HandyGames	
4 in a Wheel	Java	2008	HandyGames	
AD 1066 – William the Conqueror	Java	2008	HandyGames	
The Great Bible Game	Java	2008	HandyGames	
Romans and Barbarians	Java	2008	HandyGames	
Little Firefighter	Java	2008	HandyGames	
Sexy Twins 1	Java	2008	HandyGames	
Townsmen 6 Revolution	Java	2009	HandyGames	
Townsmen 6 Revolution	Android	February 4, 2011	HandyGames	
The Great Beer Quiz	Java	2009	HandyGames	
World of Dice	Java	2009	HandyGames	
Porn Tycoon	Java	2010	HandyGames	
Casino Crime	Java	2010	HandyGames	
Shark or Die	Java	2010	HandyGames	
Guns 'n' Glory	Java	2010	HandyGames	
Truth or Lies	iPhone	February 15, 2011	HandyGames	
Romans and Barbarians Gold	Java	2011	HandyGames	
The Egyptians Gold	Java	2011	HandyGames	
Cyberlords: Arcology	Java	2011	HandyGames	
Cyberlords: Arcology	Android	2011	HandyGames	
Clouds and Sheep	Android	2011	HandyGames	
Clouds and Sheep	iOS	2011	HandyGames	
Guns 'n' Glory WW2	Android	2011	HandyGames	
Guns 'n' Glory WW2	iOS	2011	HandyGames	
Aporkalypse: Pigs of Doom	Java	2011	HandyGames	
Aporkalypse: Pigs of Doom	Android	2011	HandyGames	
Happy Vikings	Android	2011	HandyGames	
1941 Frozen Front	Android, iOS	2013	HandyGames	
Aces of the Luftwaffe: Squadron	Microsoft Windows	July 24, 2018	HandyGames	
Aces of the Luftwaffe: Squadron	PlayStation 4	July 24, 2018	HandyGames	
Aces of the Luftwaffe: Squadron	Xbox One	July 24, 2018	HandyGames	
Giana Sisters: Twisted Dreams - Owltimate Edition	Nintendo Switch	September 28, 2018	Black Forest Games	
Aces of the Luftwaffe: Squadron - Nebelgeschwader	Microsoft Windows	November 13, 2018	HandyGames	
Aces of the Luftwaffe: Squadron - Nebelgeschwader	Nintendo Switch	November 13, 2018	HandyGames	
Aces of the Luftwaffe: Squadron - Nebelgeschwader	PlayStation 4	November 13, 2018	HandyGames	
Aces of the Luftwaffe: Squadron - Nebelgeschwader	Xbox One	November 13, 2018	HandyGames	
Jagged Alliance: Rage!	Microsoft Windows	December 6, 2018	Cliffhanger Productions	
Jagged Alliance: Rage!	PlayStation 4	December 6, 2018	Cliffhanger Productions	
Jagged Alliance: Rage!	Xbox One	December 6, 2018	Cliffhanger Productions	
Clouds & Sheep 2	Nintendo Switch	December 21, 2018	HandyGames	
Dynamite Fishing: World Games	Nintendo Switch	December 21, 2018	HandyGames	
Stunt Kite Party	Nintendo Switch	February 8, 2019	HandyGames	
Stunt Kite Party	Microsoft Windows	June 7, 2019	HandyGames	
Stunt Kite Party	PlayStation 4	June 7, 2019	HandyGames	
Stunt Kite Party	Xbox One	June 7, 2019	HandyGames	
Rad Rodgers: Radical Edition	Nintendo Switch	February 26, 2019	Slipgate Studios	
Townsmen: A Kingdom Rebuilt	Microsoft Windows	February 26, 2019	HandyGames	
Townsmen: A Kingdom Rebuilt	PlayStation 4	February 20, 2020	HandyGames	
Townsmen: A Kingdom Rebuilt	Xbox One	February 20, 2020	HandyGames	
SpellForce: Heroes & Magic	Android	April 26, 2019	Hex Games	
SpellForce: Heroes & Magic	iOS	April 26, 2019	Hex Games	
ChessFinity	Android	July 4, 2019	Orkitec	
ChessFinity	iOS	July 4, 2019	Orkitec	
Battle Chasers: Nightwar - Mobile Edition	Android	August 1, 2019	Airship Syndicate	
Battle Chasers: Nightwar - Mobile Edition	iOS	August 1, 2019	Airship Syndicate	
This Is the Police 2	Android	September 12, 2019	Weappy	
This Is the Police 2	iOS	September 12, 2019	Weappy	
Lock's Quest	Android	September 26, 2019	Digital Continue	
Lock's Quest	iOS	September 26, 2019	Digital Continue	
Little Big Workshop	Macintosh	October 17, 2019	Mirage Game Studios	
Little Big Workshop	Microsoft Windows	October 17, 2019	Mirage Game Studios	
Little Big Workshop	Xbox One	September 24, 2020	Massive Miniteam	
Little Big Workshop	PlayStation 4	September 24, 2020	Massive Miniteam	
Little Big Workshop	Nintendo Switch	October 1, 2020	Massive Miniteam	
Through the Darkest of Times	Macintosh	January 30, 2020	Paintbucket Games	
Through the Darkest of Times	Microsoft Windows	January 30, 2020	Paintbucket Games	
Through the Darkest of Times	Android	May 7, 2020	Paintbucket Games	
Through the Darkest of Times	iOS	May 7, 2020	Paintbucket Games	
Through the Darkest of Times	Nintendo Switch	August 13, 2020	Paintbucket Games	
Through the Darkest of Times	PlayStation 4	August 13, 2020	Paintbucket Games	
Through the Darkest of Times	Xbox One	August 13, 2020	Paintbucket Games	
Through the Darkest of Times	Stadia	August 13, 2020	Paintbucket Games	
Townsmen: A Kingdom Rebuilt – The Seaside Empire	Microsoft Windows	February 20, 2020	HandyGames	
Townsmen: A Kingdom Rebuilt – The Seaside Empire	Nintendo Switch	February 20, 2020	HandyGames	
Townsmen: A Kingdom Rebuilt – The Seaside Empire	PlayStation 4	February 20, 2020	HandyGames	
Townsmen: A Kingdom Rebuilt – The Seaside Empire	Xbox One	February 20, 2020	HandyGames	
Spitlings	Stadia	Spitlings	Massive Miniteam	
Aces of the Luftwaffe: Squadron – Extended Edition	Android	February 28, 2020	HandyGames	
Aces of the Luftwaffe: Squadron – Extended Edition	iOS	February 28, 2020	HandyGames	
Rebel Cops	Android	April 23, 2020	Weappy	
Rebel Cops	iOS	April 23, 2020	Weappy	
Spitlings	Microsoft Windows	August 4, 2020	Massive Miniteam	
Spitlings	Nintendo Switch	August 4, 2020	Massive Miniteam	
Spitlings	PlayStation 4	August 4, 2020	Massive Miniteam	
Spitlings	Xbox One	August 4, 2020	Massive Miniteam	
Neighbours back From Hell	Microsoft Windows	October 8, 2020	FarbWorks	
Neighbours back From Hell	Nintendo Switch	October 8, 2020	FarbWorks	
Neighbours back From Hell	PlayStation 4	October 8, 2020	FarbWorks	
Neighbours back From Hell	Xbox One	October 8, 2020	FarbWorks	
Neighbours back From Hell	Stadia	October 8, 2020	FarbWorks	
Neighbours back From Hell	Android	August 3, 2021	HandyGames	
Neighbours back From Hell	iOS	August 3, 2021	HandyGames	
Chicken Police: Paint it Red!	Microsoft Windows	November 5, 2020	The Wild Gentlemen	
Chicken Police: Paint it Red!	Nintendo Switch	November 5, 2020	The Wild Gentlemen	
Chicken Police: Paint it Red!	PlayStation 4	November 5, 2020	The Wild Gentlemen	
Chicken Police: Paint it Red!	Xbox One	November 5, 2020	The Wild Gentlemen	
Chicken Police: Paint it Red!	Android	June 29, 2021	HandyGames	
Chicken Police: Paint it Red!	iOS	June 29, 2021	HandyGames	
Chicken Police: Paint it Red!	MacOS	November 4, 2021	The Wild Gentlemen	
Chicken Police: Paint it Red!	Stadia	November 4, 2021	The Wild Gentlemen	
Chicken Police: Paint it Red!	PlayStation 5	March 30, 2022	The Wild Gentlemen	
Chicken Police: Paint it Red!	Xbox Series X/S	March 30, 2022	The Wild Gentlemen	
Little Big Workshop	Stadia	November 6, 2020	Massive Miniteam	
El Hijo: A Wild West Tale	Microsoft Windows	December 3, 2020	Honig Studios	
El Hijo: A Wild West Tale	Stadia	December 3, 2020	Honig Studios	
El Hijo: A Wild West Tale	Nintendo Switch	March 25, 2021	Quantumfrog	
El Hijo: A Wild West Tale	PlayStation 4	March 25, 2021	Quantumfrog	
El Hijo: A Wild West Tale	Xbox One	March 25, 2021	Quantumfrog	
El Hijo: A Wild West Tale	Android	January 25, 2022	HandyGames	
El Hijo: A Wild West Tale	iOS	January 25, 2022	HandyGames	
SpongeBob SquarePants: Battle for Bikini Bottom – Rehydrated	Android	January 21, 2021	HandyGames	
SpongeBob SquarePants: Battle for Bikini Bottom – Rehydrated	iOS	January 21, 2021	HandyGames	
Titan Quest: Legendary Edition	Android	February 2, 2021	HandyGames	
Titan Quest: Legendary Edition	iOS	February 2, 2021	HandyGames	
Pile Up! Box by Box	Microsoft Windows	March 18, 2021	Seed by Seed	
Pile Up! Box by Box	Nintendo Switch	August 17, 2021	Seed by Seed	
Pile Up! Box by Box	PlayStation 4	August 17, 2021	Seed by Seed	
Pile Up! Box by Box	Xbox One	August 17, 2021	Seed by Seed	
Skydrift Infinity	Microsoft Windows	July 29, 2021	HandyGames	
Skydrift Infinity	Nintendo Switch	July 29, 2021	HandyGames	
Skydrift Infinity	PlayStation 4	July 29, 2021	HandyGames	
Skydrift Infinity	Xbox One	July 29, 2021	HandyGames	
One Hand Clapping	Android	December 14, 2021	Bad Dream Games	
One Hand Clapping	iOS	December 14, 2021	Bad Dream Games	
One Hand Clapping	Microsoft Windows	December 14, 2021	Bad Dream Games	
One Hand Clapping	Nintendo Switch	December 14, 2021	Bad Dream Games	
One Hand Clapping	PlayStation 4	December 14, 2021	Bad Dream Games	
One Hand Clapping	Xbox One	December 14, 2021	Bad Dream Games	
One Hand Clapping	Stadia	December 14, 2021	Bad Dream Games	
One Hand Clapping	Xbox Series X/S	March 31, 2022	Bad Dream Games	
One Hand Clapping	PlayStation 5	April 5, 2022	Bad Dream Games	
Scarf	Microsoft Windows	December 23, 2021	Uprising Studios	
Townsmen VR	HTC Vive	March 24, 2022	HandyGames	
Townsmen VR	Oculus Rift	March 24, 2022	HandyGames	
Townsmen VR	PlayStation VR	March 24, 2022	HandyGames	
This Is the President	Android	May 10, 2022	HandyGames	
This Is the President	iOS	May 10, 2022	HandyGames	
Endling: Extinction is Forever	Microsoft Windows	July 19, 2022	Herobeat Studios	
Endling: Extinction is Forever	Nintendo Switch	July 19, 2022	Herobeat Studios	
Endling: Extinction is Forever	PlayStation 4	July 19, 2022	Herobeat Studios	
Endling: Extinction is Forever	Xbox One	July 19, 2022	Herobeat Studios	
Endling: Extinction is Forever	PlayStation 5	November 3, 2022	Herobeat Studios	
Endling: Extinction is Forever	Xbox Series X/S	November 3, 2022	Herobeat Studios	
Endling: Extinction is Forever	Android	February 7, 2023	Herobeat Studios	
Endling: Extinction is Forever	iOS	February 7, 2023	Herobeat Studios	
Are You Smarter Than a 5th Grader?	Microsoft Windows	August 23, 2022	Massive Miniteam	
Are You Smarter Than a 5th Grader?	Nintendo Switch	August 23, 2022	Massive Miniteam	
Are You Smarter Than a 5th Grader?	PlayStation 4	August 23, 2022	Massive Miniteam	
Are You Smarter Than a 5th Grader?	PlayStation 5	August 23, 2022	Massive Miniteam	
Are You Smarter Than a 5th Grader?	Xbox One	August 23, 2022	Massive Miniteam	
Are You Smarter Than a 5th Grader?	Xbox Series X/S	August 23, 2022	Massive Miniteam	
Wreckfest Mobile	Android	November 16, 2022	HandyGames	
Wreckfest Mobile	iOS	November 16, 2022	HandyGames	
Perish	Microsoft Windows	February 2, 2023	Item 42	
De-Exit: Eternal Matters	Microsoft Windows	April 14, 2023	SandBloom Studio	
De-Exit: Eternal Matters	PlayStation 4	April 14, 2023	SandBloom Studio	
De-Exit: Eternal Matters	Xbox One	April 14, 2023	SandBloom Studio	
De-Exit: Eternal Matters	PlayStation 5	April 14, 2023	SandBloom Studio	
De-Exit: Eternal Matters	Xbox Series X/S	April 14, 2023	SandBloom Studio	
Airhead	Microsoft Windows	TBA	Octato	
Airhead	Nintendo Switch	TBA	Octato	
Airhead	PlayStation 4	TBA	Octato	
Airhead	Xbox One	TBA	Octato	
A Rat's Quest: The Way Back Home	Microsoft Windows	TBA	The Dreamerians	
A Rat's Quest: The Way Back Home	Nintendo Switch	TBA	The Dreamerians	
A Rat's Quest: The Way Back Home	PlayStation 4	TBA	The Dreamerians	
A Rat's Quest: The Way Back Home	Xbox One	TBA	The Dreamerians	
Devil and the Fairy	HTC Vive	TBA	HandyGames	
Devil and the Fairy	Meta Rift	TBA	HandyGames	
Devil and the Fairy	Steam VR	TBA	HandyGames	
Lethal Honor: Order of the Apocalypse	Microsoft Windows	TBA	Viral Studios	
Lethal Honor: Order of the Apocalypse	Nintendo Switch	TBA	Viral Studios	
Lethal Honor: Order of the Apocalypse	PlayStation 4	TBA	Viral Studios	
Lethal Honor: Order of the Apocalypse	Xbox One	TBA	Viral Studios	
