= Budget Cuts =

2018 video game

- Developer: Neat Corporation
- Publisher: Neat Corporation
- Engine: Unity
- Platforms: Windows, PlayStation 4 (PlayStation VR), Oculus Quest 2
- Release: Windows; June 14, 2018; PlayStation 4 May 15, 2020
- Genres: Stealth, action
- Mode: Single-player

Budget Cuts is an independent virtual reality stealth game developed and published by Swedish studio Neat Corporation. The player is tasked with escaping an office building using a portal device while evading detection from robotic managers. Neat Corporation made a demo in 2016 for a showcase with Valve Software with an initial release date the same year, and eventually released on Steam in 2018.

The sequel, Budget Cuts 2: Mission Insolvency, released in 2019. A collection containing both the original and sequel game and the DLC was released as Budget Cuts Ultimate on September 20, 2023.

== Gameplay ==
Budget Cuts has the player move around the office building using a portal gun. This device, when activated, shoots a projectile in the direction it is facing and bounces off walls to land on a movable position. Once landed, it creates a small and movable heads-up display which can be used to view the area where the ball landed to scope out the next location. The player can then teleport to the new location if desired.

A core mechanic of the game is throwing knives and scissors at enemies. The weapons were made to hit the target with the sharp edge so to always cause harm with an accurate aim by the player.

== Plot ==
Budget Cuts is set in a company called "TransCorp," filled with human-like robotic office workers and security guards. There are no other people to be found, except for a voice over the phone, Winta. Winta informs the player that people have been disappearing, and the protagonist is the next target of an unspecified group. The player must escape the office buildings of TransCorp, while hiding from supervisors, walking security guards with guns.

== Reception ==
Reception

Aggregate score
Aggregator	Score
Metacritic	PC: 76/100; PS4: 78/100

The game received generally positive reviews, according to review aggregator Metacritic. IGN writer Mitch Dyer said that it "might be the best, most interesting VR game I’ve played." Jeuxvideo.com criticized it for having a repetitive game pattern, and praised by Rock Paper Shotgun for integrating the locomotion as a gameplay feature.
