= NDreams =

Video game company

nDreams, Ltd.
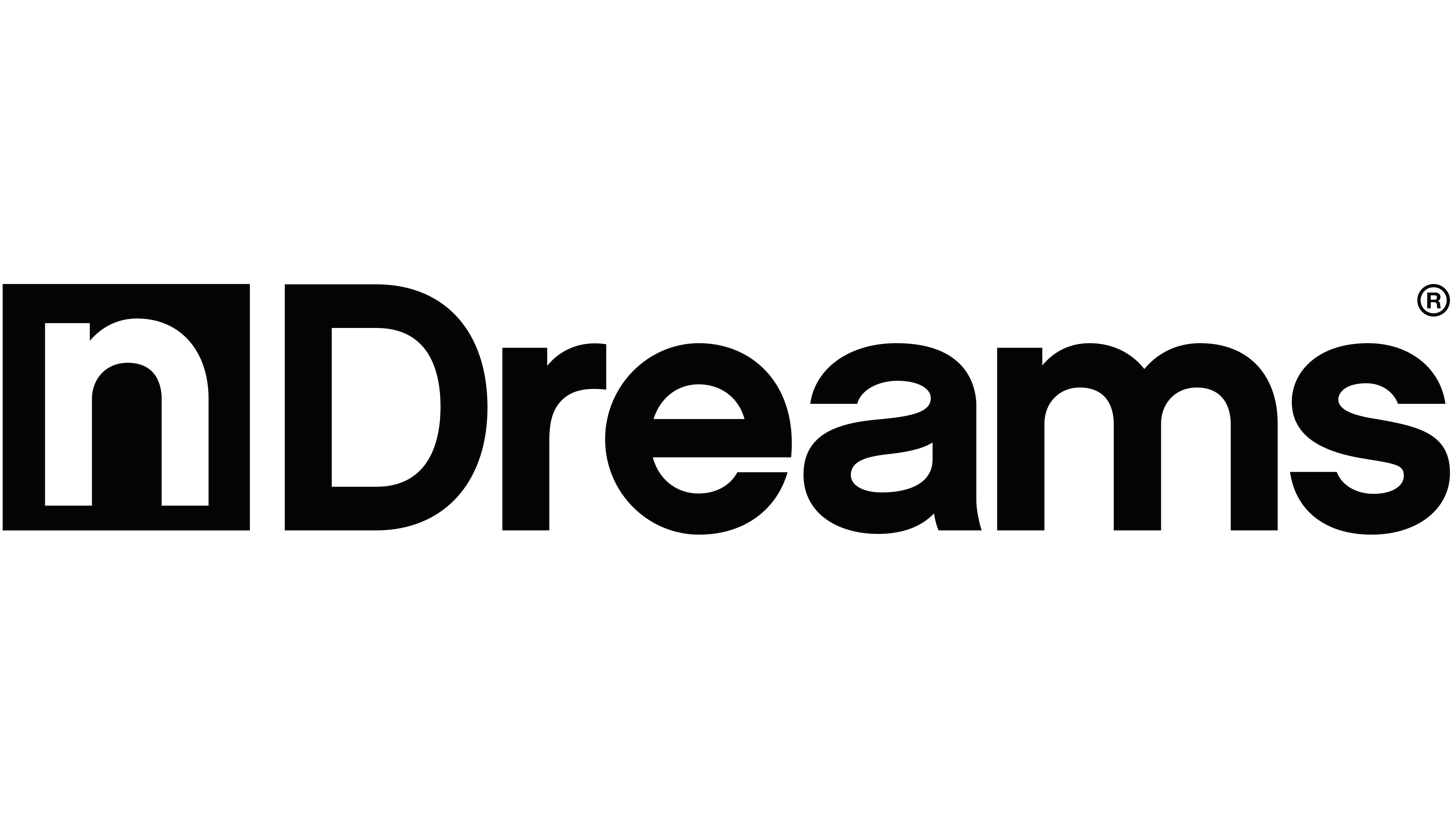
- Type: Video game developer
- Industry: Video games
- Founded: August 2006; 20 years ago
- Founder: Patrick O'Luanaigh
- Headquarters: Farnborough, Hampshire, United Kingdom
- Products: FRENZIES; Synapse (video game); VENDETTA FOREVER; Little Cities
- Owner: Aonic (2023–present)
- Website: www.ndreams.com

nDreams is a company that develops and publishes virtual reality video games. Based in Farnborough, Hampshire, UK, it was formed in August 2006 by former SCi and Eidos creative director, Patrick O'Luanaigh.

Since formation, the developer has worked on numerous projects for different video game platforms, initially PlayStation Home, the virtual world on Sony's PlayStation 3 console, where it grew to become one of the leading publishers.

From late 2013 it began working on content for virtual reality (VR) headsets, such as Sony's PlayStation VR, Oculus Rift and Samsung Gear VR. The company has stated that they are now entirely focused on developing content for virtual reality and are one of the world's biggest developers in the VR space.

On 20 November 2023 it was announced that Aonic completed the "landmark" acquisition of nDreams for $110 million.

== Early Years: PlayStation Home and ARGs ==
nDreams claimed to be one of the world's leading independent developers and publishers in PlayStation Home, the virtual world on Sony's PlayStation 3 console. The company created numerous games, virtual spaces and items for the platform between 2009 and 2013. At the time of PlayStation Home's closure, CEO Patrick O'Luanaigh stated that it "was a commercial success" for nDreams.

The first project created by nDreams for PlayStation Home was the world's first console-based and virtual world-based alternate reality game, Xi. Xi was released on 23 March 2009 and lasted a total of 12 weeks, taking place within PlayStation Home, across the web and in the real world.

nDreams' next project for Home was a personal space called "The Pirate Galleon Apartment" which also released in 2009. This was the European Home's first personal space to have a mini-game with prizes. In 2010, nDreams released another personal space called "Musicality". In this space users could play a multiplayer music game.

Lewis Hamilton: Secret Life was nDreams' second alternate reality game. It was not based in PlayStation Home like Xi was. The ARG was created for Reebok, who also co-developed the game. Wired called it 'one of the most engaging, interactive, and exciting games of 2010.' The game launched in March 2010 and ran until November 2010, with over 637,000 players from 154 countries taking part. They worked together to solve puzzles and complete tests online, on mobiles and in the real world. Live events took place across the globe including tasks in Spain, Lebanon, Malaysia, India and the United Kingdom. The game was run in nine languages (English, French, Italian, German, Spanish, Japanese, Mandarin Chinese, Turkish and Korean), which Guinness acknowledged as a world record for a game of this type in 2013.

In 2011, nDreams released a new game space called "Aurora" where PlayStation Home users can visit and play various mini games, receive rewards and hang out with fellow users. Aurora had over 18 million visits from 1.8 million unique players, making it nDreams' most successful project in PlayStation Home. nDreams also created numerous virtual items for use on a player's avatar as well as many more spaces.

== First VR Games: 2013 - 2020 ==
Since 2013, nDreams has focused on developing content for virtual reality headsets. The first game released by nDreams for virtual reality was the tech demo SkyDIEving, which launched in 2013. This saw players freefalling through the sky until they inevitably crashed to their doom on the ground. Patrick O'Luanaigh stated that nDreams had seen "fantastic" reaction to SkyDIEving since it was released in 2013 and the demo received many plaudits.

In June 2014 at the E3 video game show nDreams announced The Assembly, which was planned for release on the Oculus Rift and Sony PlayStation VR headsets. The Assembly is an adventure game where you uncover the morally dubious secrets of an unknown scientific organisation from the perspective of two different characters.

In January 2015, nDreams announced a $2.75 million investment from Mercia Technologies. This investment is planned to allow the studio to expand and invest in research and development of virtual reality games. One of Mercia's leaders, former Sega CEO Mike Hayes, had previously joined the nDreams board of directors in 2014.

The Assembly launched in 2016 for PlayStation VR and PC VR headsets. PCGamesN called it “the first VR experience that feels like a fully-fledged game,” while GamesRadar added that it “could be the breakthrough game for VR storytelling.”

Also in 2016, the VR mindfulness experience Perfect, developed by Near Light and published by nDreams, was released for PlayStation VR, Oculus Rift and HTC Vive. It was the first VR collaboration between nDreams and Near Light, who would go on to strike up a long-term partnership.

In 2017, nDreams released Shooty Fruity for PlayStation VR. Like Perfect, the game was a collaboration with Near Light. It would later come to Steam (2018) and Meta Quest (2020).

Perfect Balloon Flight and Shooty Fruity Arcade, both adaptations of previous nDreams titles for the home VR market, were revealed as location-based VR experiences for VR arcades in 2018.

Phantom: Covert Ops was announced in 2019, winning the Game Critics Award for Best AR/VR Game. It launched on Meta Quest in 2020, passing $1 million in revenue within “a few weeks”.

== Continued VR Success: 2021 - Present ==
nDreams returned to location-based virtual reality game experiences in 2021, partnering with Ubisoft and Zero Latency VR to launch Far Cry VR: Dive Into Insanity at VR arcades across the world. The experience takes players back to Far Cry 3’s Rook Islands and stars its antagonist Vaas.

Also in 2021, nDreams announced and launched Fracked for PlayStation VR. The action shooter would later launch on Steam and Meta Quest platforms, winning Best VR Game at the TIGA Awards in 2022.

nDreams expanded from solely internal development in 2021 with the announcement that it was moving into third-party publishing and had set up a $2 million development fund. In October 2021, it announced that Little Cities, a VR game developed by Purple Yonder, was to be its first third-party published game.

Frank Sagnier, formerly CEO of Codemasters, was appointed as nDreams' non-executive chair, citing “some very ambitious goals.” Meanwhile, nDreams continued to invest in its internal development teams, announcing the openings of new development studios Orbital and Elevation in 2021 and 2022 respectively.

Soon after announcing its receipt of a $35 million investment from Aonic, nDreams were revealed to be the developers of Ghostbusters: Rise of the Ghost Lord as part of the game’s announcement by Mark Zuckerberg at the Meta Quest Gaming Showcase.

In December 2022, nDreams announced it had acquired the Brighton-based virtual reality studio Near Light (developer of Shooty Fruity) for an undisclosed sum.

Synapse, ranked critically among the best games on PlayStation VR2, was announced at a State of Play livestream event in February 2023 and was released for PlayStation VR2 on July 4 the same year. It made use of a number of PS VR2-specific hardware features, such as eye-tracking.

Synapse was nominated for Best VR / AR Game at the 2023 instalment of The Game Awards, with the top prize eventually going to Resident Evil Village.

Sony Pictures Virtual Reality published the nDreams-developed Ghostbusters: Rise of the Ghost Lord in October 2023. Shortly after, in November, PowerWash Simulator VR launched on Meta Quest following the major success of its PC and console versions. nDreams partnered with PowerWash Simulator creators FuturLab to provide VR support.

In July 2024, nDreams announced FRENZIES, a VR multiplayer shooter with ever-changing round types “where the momentum can shift in a moment’s notice”. Coming to Meta Quest and PS VR2 platforms, it is developed by nDreams’ Brighton studio Near Light.

At the inaugural VR Games Showcase in August 2024, nDreams revealed VENDETTA FOREVER, a shooter for Meta Quest and PS VR2 developed by independent studio Meat Space Interactive. TechRadar’s Hamish Hector wrote that “it might just be the best shooter the Meta Quest 3 has to offer.”

== Awards and nominations ==
- 2024: Develop:Star Awards – Talent Development Star winner
- 2024: NYX Game Awards – Grand Winner – Sony PlayStation VR Game (Synapse)
- 2024: NYX Game Awards – Gold Winner – Meta Quest VR Evolving Game (Little Cities)
- 2023: AIXR VR Awards – Outstanding VR Company of the Year winner
- 2023: TIGA Awards – Best VR/AR Game winner (Synapse)
- 2023: The Game Awards – Best VR/AR Game nominee (Synapse)
- 2023: GamesIndustry.biz Best Places to Work Awards – Education Award winner
- 2023: Develop:Star Awards – Marketing Star winner
- 2022: UploadVR – Favorite New Quest Game of 2022 (Little Cities)
- 2022: TIGA Awards – Best VR/AR Game winner (Fracked)
- 2020: TIGA Awards – Best VR Game winner (Phantom: Covert Ops)
- 2019: Game Critics Award – Best VR/AR Game winner (Phantom: Covert Ops)
- 2019: Viveport Developer Award – Arcade - PC winner (Shooty Fruity Arcade)
