= Synapse (video game) =

- Developer: nDreams
- Publisher: nDreams
- Director: Dan Taylor
- Producer: Wolfgang Graebner
- Designer: Jey Hicks
- Programmer: Richard Copperwaite
- Artist: Alina Fedasyenka
- Composer: Paul Weir
- Platform: PlayStation 5
- Release: July 4, 2023
- Genre: First-person shooter
- Mode: Single-player

Synapse is a 2023 first-person shooter video game developed and published by nDreams. The game was released for the PlayStation VR2 virtual reality headset in July 2023 and received generally positive reviews upon release.

== Gameplay ==
In Synapse, which is played from first-person, the player assumes the role of a special agent who must infiltrate the mind of a rogue colonel and extract intel to stop a plan that will result in mass destruction. Gameplay focuses on dual-wielding combat, with the player wielding a gun in one hand while performing telekinetic abilities with the other. The game utilizes the eye-tracking functionality of the PlayStation VR2 headset, allowing players to select interactable objects through simply looking at it.

The game adopts a structure commonly found in roguelike games. Each successful run will grant players "Revelations", which are permanent upgrades for combat. The game features three distinct skill trees, focusing on the player character's weapons, telekinetic abilities, and general resilience. As players progress in the game, they will unlock new weapons such as a pistol, a shotgun, an submachine gun, and a grenade launcher, as well as new abilities such as directly lifting and throwing enemies, as well as capturing grenades mid-air.

== Development ==
Synapse was developed by UK developer nDreams. It was considered to be an important project for the studio, which described it as "the culmination of a decade of VR-only development". The game was initially envisioned as a spiritual successor to Fracked, the studio's previous game. Paul Weir, who previously worked on No Man's Sky, served as the game's composer. He was inspired by the works of Hans Zimmer, especially his score for Christopher Nolan's "cerebral blockbuster movies". David Hayter and Jennifer Hale were cast as Colonel Peter Conrad and Handler Clara Sorensen respectively. Hayter described his character as "legitimately insane", while Hale described hers as "goal-oriented".

Synapse was announced at a State of Play livestream event in February 2023, and was released for PlayStation VR2 on July 4 the same year.

== Reception ==
Synapse received generally positive reviews upon release, according to review aggregator Metacritic. The game was awarded "Best AR/VR Game" at TIGA Awards 2023.

Ian Higton from Eurogamer described the game as "a pure power fantasy that epitomises everything great about virtual reality" and a "must-buy game that deserves to be played by anyone who owns a PSVR2". He praised the gameplay for enabling players to feel "unstoppable", and noted that the game was more replayable than most other VR shooters. Graham Banas from Push Square liked the frantic gameplay, though he felt that the monochromatic visuals failed to create distinctive in-game environments, and noted that Synapse did not have content. Gamereactor's Petter Hegevall also remarked that the monochromatic visuals made the overall gameplay experience repetitive. While he noted that the game was mechanically effective, the game ultimately felt like a "glorified tech demo".
