= Red Matter (video game) =

2018 video game

- Developer: Vertical Robot
- Publisher: Vertical Robot
- Designers: Tatiana Delgado, Manuel Fernández-Truchaud
- Programmer: Iñaki Hernández
- Artists: Pedro Pablo Fernández Moya, Norman Schaar, Mario Garcia, Alfredo Gutiérrez
- Composer: Eduardo de la Iglesia
- Engine: Unreal Engine 4
- Platforms: HTC Vive, Oculus Rift, Windows Mixed Reality, PlayStation VR
- Release: Oculus Rift; May 24, 2018; HTC Vive; November 10, 2018; PlayStation VR; December 10, 2018; Oculus Quest; August 15, 2019
- Genre: Puzzle
- Mode: Single-player

Red Matter is a 2018 sci-fi virtual reality game developed and published by Spanish studio Vertical Robot. The player plays as Agent Epsilon, who crash lands on one of Saturn's moons, Rhea, and goes to explore a nearby military base belonging to the fictional People's Republic of Volgravia. The game received positive reviews from critics, who praised the atmosphere of the environments, but criticized some of the puzzles as being confusing. Red Matter released on May 24, 2018, for Oculus Rift, with versions for the HTC Vive, Oculus Quest, and PlayStation VR launching in November 2018, December 2018, and August 2019, respectively. A sequel, Red Matter 2, was released for Steam VR and Meta Quest 2 on 18 August 2022 and for PlayStation VR2 on 18 May 2023.

== Plot ==
Agent Epsilon of the Atlantic Union is dispatched to the top secret Volgravian-controlled research facility, Strelka N3, on Saturn's moon, Rhea. The facility appears abandoned, except for unusual anomalies and an unknown figure observing Epsilon in a Volgravian cosmonaut suit. Epsilon is directed by their commander via radio to download the station's data to determine what happened. As Epsilon moves further into the facility, they experience hallucinations warning someone named Sasha not to trust “them”.

Epsilon learns that the personnel on the station were infected by an alien mold-like substance discovered on the moon's surface. One of the scientists, Irina, became disillusioned after an accidental exposure to the “red matter” consumed a fellow researcher and the lack of concern by the Volgravian leadership. Unfortunately, the station's security head, Nikolai, was informed of Irina's concerns and decided to poison her and cover it up as an accident.

As Epsilon pieces together the events, they learn they are actually Sasha Riss, a scientist assigned to Strelka N3, whose escape pod was intercepted by the Atlantic Union. The mission commander is, in truth, observing Sasha using a virtual environment being fed into his brain and the mysterious astronaut is actually Sasha's subconsciousness warning him he is being used to uncover Volgravia's research into quantum teleportation. Shortly, Sasha's interrogator sends himself into the virtual environment to forcibly retrieve the information from Sasha despite the danger of having two minds connected.

However, Sasha seizes control from the interrogator and destroys the virtual environment with the latter still inside. Sasha wakes up in the Atlantic Union facility, with his mind transferred into the interrogator's body, and discovers that his original body has died from the trauma.

Shortly, another Atlantic Union agent that has been observing the interrogation from afar asks if the mission has succeeded. Once Sasha acknowledges in his new body the agent is revealed to be an undercover spy from Volgravia and congratulates Sasha for a job well done.

== Gameplay ==
The player using the game's translation tool

The game is set in an alternate sci-fi Cold War universe, where the war was fought between the fictional nations of the Atlantic Union and Volgravia. The player plays as Agent Epsilon, an agent for the Atlantic Union. After crash-landing on the moon Rhea, the player begins exploring the base. Players receive information from the "commander", an AI in the player's space suit. Red Matter also has a translation device which can be used to translate writing found around the base into English. The game has different types of puzzles, such as using symbols to activate lasers and finding codes to progress. Players use motion controllers to interact with objects, and to use tools. Traversal options include smooth movement with an analog stick, teleportation, and "space hopping", in which the player uses a jetpack to boost upwards before controlling their landing with braking and acceleration.

== Development ==
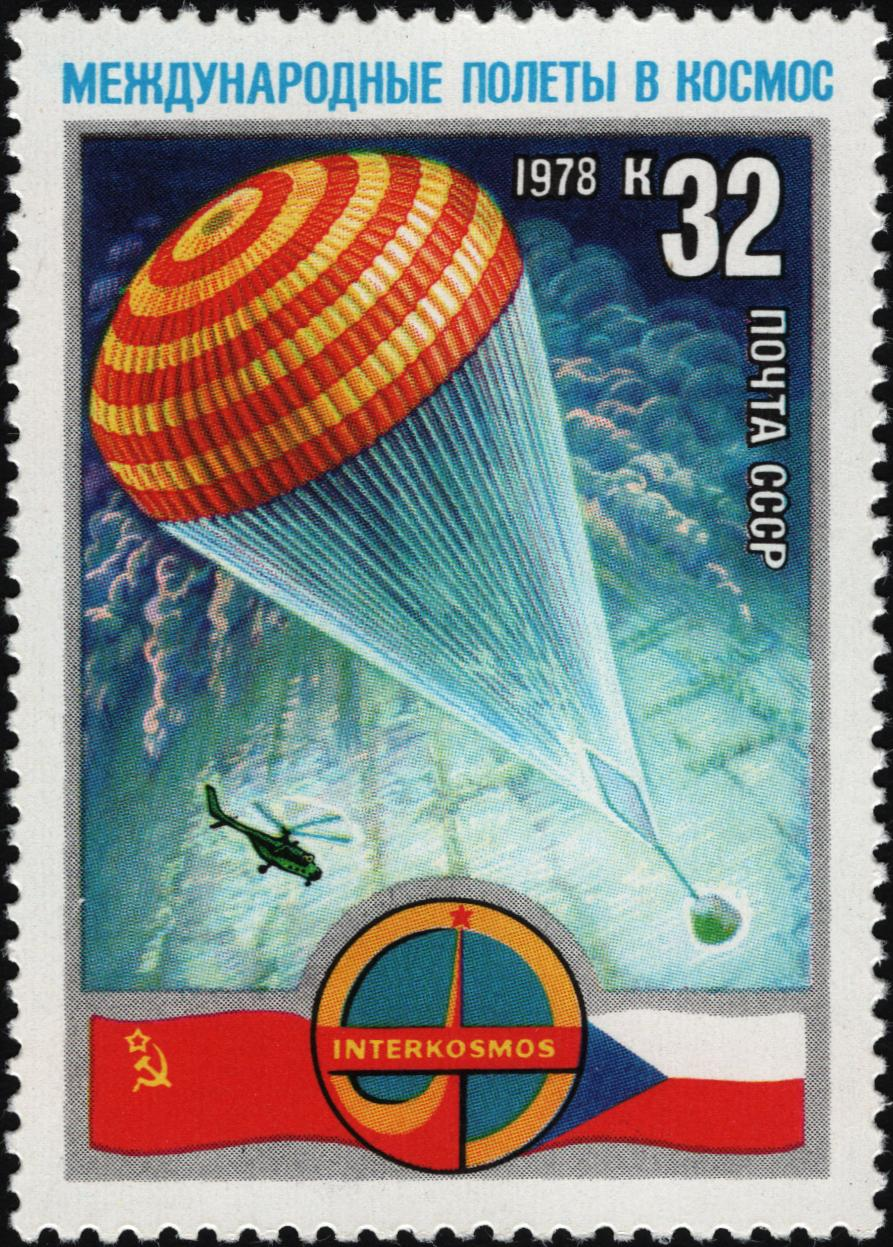
Art created to commemorate the 1978 Soviet-Czechoslovak Space Flight

Vertical Robot initially planned Red Matter as its first game, but the project's scope required additional financial support. To avoid wasting time while finding a backer, the team created various demos, one of them, a locomotion demo for Red Matter ended up becoming Vertical Robot's first title, Daedalus. The title helped Vertical Robot test Unreal Engine's potential for VR games and gain insight into the VR market. After the completion of Daedalus, development resumed on the project. The developers said that the reason they made a world inspired by the Cold War was that "There is some basis on the real Cold War but we really wanted to distance ourselves from actual history and invent a dystopian fantasy with two completely make-believe factions. This would allow us to manipulate and create characters and plots that will surprise players".

Vertical Robot considered using Russian text for the game but decided against it, as they didn't want to make the translation tool useless for Russian players. The developers wanted to make a sci-fi game but said they were aware "that it's a genre that's been done to death" so they used posters from the Soviet space program as an inspiration for the setting, alongside various Cold War stories. On the subject of locomotion the team stated: "We decided to offer players as broad a range of options as possible within our technical capabilities being such a small team. We're lucky enough to have a variety of preferences within our own team, ranging from people who are highly resilient to motion sickness to others that become dizzy almost immediately, so we understand the importance of offering as many options as possible". The developers focused on making the controls intuitive by modeling the touch controllers in game, and making each of the game's tools simple to use. For the Oculus Quest version, Vertical Robot simplified meshes and precompiled shaders in order to ensure higher performance for the port.

Red Matter released on May 24, 2018, for Oculus Rift, November 10, 2018 for the HTC Vive, and December 10, 2018, for PlayStation VR. An Oculus Quest version was released on August 15, 2019.

== Reception ==
Reception

Aggregate score
Aggregator	Score
Metacritic	84/100

Review scores
Publication	Score
Road to VR	8.3/10
UploadVR	8/10

Red Matter received "generally favorable reviews" according to Metacritic.

UploadVR's Jamie Feltham praised the game's atmosphere, writing "there's the atmosphere, which is masterfully layered on. Red Matter's environments are intricately detailed with decorations and notes that flesh out the story in an authentic way". He criticized some of the game's later puzzles, "There are some duff notes with the puzzling, especially in the later levels where Vertical isn't as generous with clues as it should be".

Scott Hayden, writing for Road to VR, liked Red Matter's visuals, saying that "Visually, Red Matter is a stunning showcase of the team's expertise in Unreal Engine. Textures are extremely high quality, and the game's architecture is nothing short of awe-inspiring". Hayden disliked the intrusiveness of the suit's AI, "I'm not a fan of the 'helpful robot' trope in VR adventures because they tend to get annoying after a while, and I'll admit the commander got on my nerves a little".
