= List of Meta Quest games =

Oculus Meta Quest's games

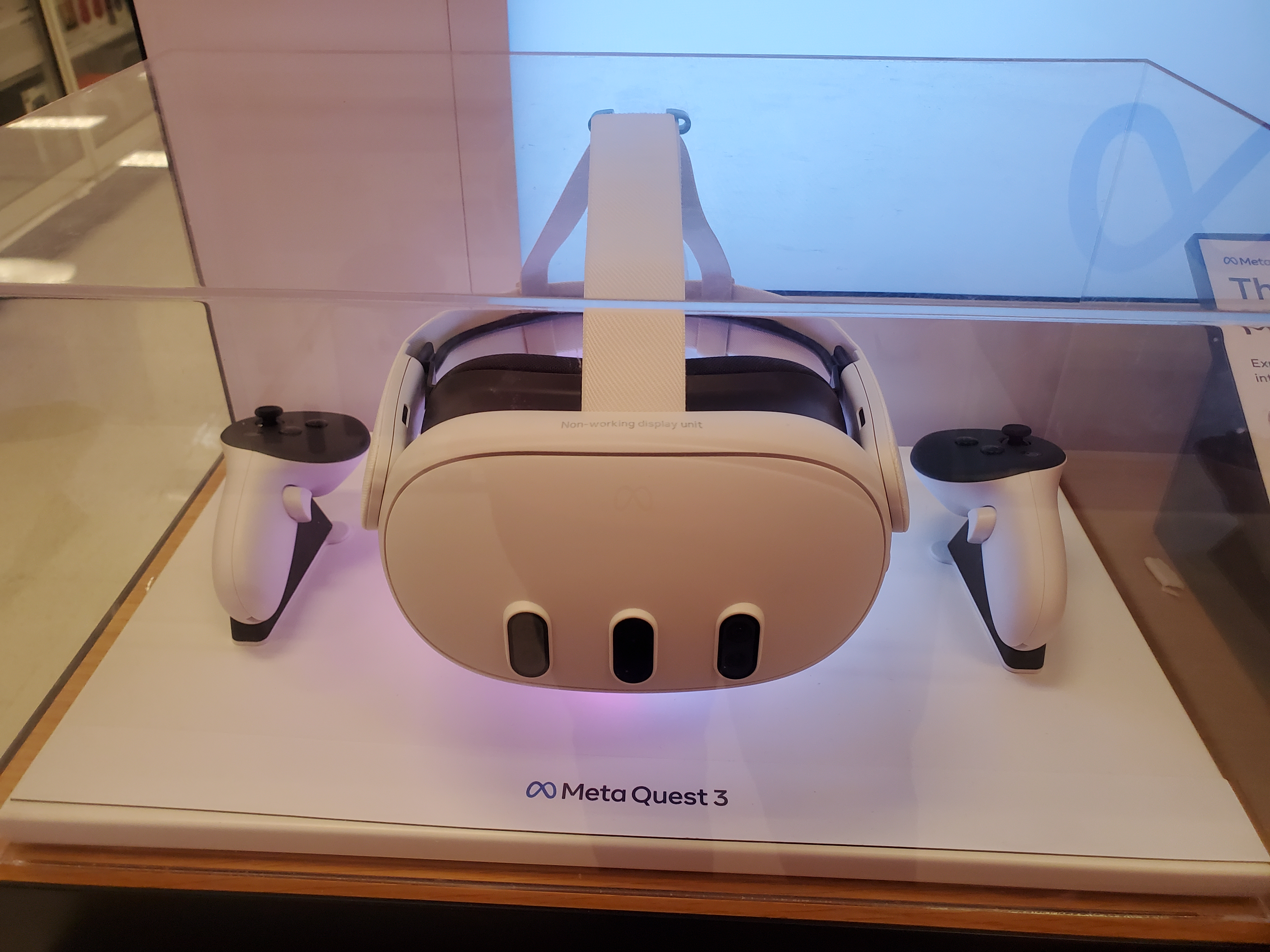
A Meta Quest 3

This is a list of video games that run on the Oculus Quest, Oculus/Meta Quest 2, Meta Quest Pro, Meta Quest 3, and/or Meta Quest 3S that are notable enough for Wikipedia articles.

Games that require sideloading are included in this list.

== Meta Quest ==
- Accounting+
- Alien: Rogue Incursion
- AltspaceVR
- Among Us 3D
- Angry Birds VR: Isle of Pigs
- Arizona Sunshine
- Arizona Sunshine 2
- Asgard's Wrath 2
- Assassin's Creed Nexus VR
- Audioshield
- Batman: Arkham Shadow
- Beat Saber
- Blade & Sorcery: Nomad
- Bonelab
- Broken Spectre
- The Climb
- Creed: Rise to Glory
- Cooking Clash
- Dance Central
- Death Horizon: Reloaded
- Eleven Table Tennis
- The Exorcist: Legion VR
- A Fisherman's Tale
- Five Nights at Freddy's: Help Wanted
- Five Nights at Freddy's: Help Wanted 2
- Fruit Ninja
- Gorilla Tag
- Ghostbusters: Rise of the Ghost Lord
- Ghost Giant
- Henry
- I Am Cat
- I Am Security
- I Am Monkey
- I Am Bird
- I Am Janitor
- I Expect You to Die
- I Expect You to Die 2: The Spy and the Liar
- I Expect You To Die 3: Cog in the Machine
- Job Simulator
- Jurassic World Aftermath
- Just Dance VR
- Keep Talking and Nobody Explodes
- Laser Limbo
- The Last Clockwinder
- The Last Worker
- Marvel's Deadpool VR
- Metro Awakening
- Moss
- Moss: Book II
- Myst
- Notes on Blindness
- OhShape
- Per Aspera
- Pinball FX VR
- Please, Don't Touch Anything
- PokerStars
- Population: One
- PowerWash Simulator VR
- Rec Room
- Red Matter
- Resident Evil 4
- Robo Recall: Unplugged
- Roblox
- The Room VR: A Dark Matter
- Sam & Max: This Time It's Virtual!
- Samba de Amigo: Virtual Party
- Scary Baboon
- Skydance's Behemoth
- Smash Drums
- Sniper Elite VR
- Space Pirate Trainer
- Spice & Wolf
- Star Trek: Bridge Crew
- Star Wars: Tales from the Galaxy's Edge
- Superhot VR
- Synth Riders
- Taxi Driver VR
- Tetris Effect: Connected
- Thumper
- Tilt Brush
- Time Stall
- Trover Saves the Universe
- The Under Presents
- The Walking Dead: Saints & Sinners
- The Walking Dead: Saints & Sinners – Chapter 2: Retribution
- Thief VR: Legacy of Shadow
- Until You Fall
- Vader Immortal: Episode I
- Vader Immortal: Episode II
- Vader Immortal: Episode III
- VRChat
- Waltz of the Wizard
- Within

== See also ==
- List of Oculus Rift games
- List of HTC Vive games
- List of PlayStation VR games
- List of PlayStation VR2 games
