= List of HTC Vive games =

The following games have been designed for the HTC Vive platform.

== List ==
Title	Developer	Publisher	Release date	Notes
Dash Dash World	MOTIONX STUDIO	MOTIONX STUDIO	Q4 2020	
#Archery	VRUnicorns	Bandello	Dec 19, 2017	
#SelfieTennis	VRUnicorns	Bandello	Apr 1, 2016	
#SkiJump	VRUnicorns	Bandello	TBA	
#Utopia	VRUnicorns	Bandello	2019	
"BUTTS: The VR Experience"	Tyler Hurd	Tyler Hurd	Feb 4, 2016	
'n Verlore Verstand	Skobbejak Games	Skobbejak Games	Feb 1, 2016	
(VR)西汉帝陵 The Han Dynasty Imperial Mausoleums	派嘉数创科技有限公司	派嘉数创科技有限公司	Jan 21, 2017	
0 Day	Zero Day Games	Zero Day Games	Nov 16, 2016	
0°N 0°W VR	Colorfiction	Colorfiction	Aug 18, 2018	
1-2-Swift	MNGOVR	PITAYA NETWORK LIMITED	Jan 30, 2017	
10 seconds	Zynk Software	Zynk Software	Jul 16, 2018	
10k	Dynamoid	Dynamoid	Aug 15, 2018	
18 Floors	Aoga Tech	Winking Skywalker	Jul 3, 2018	
1943 Berlin Blitz	BBC Media Applications Technologies Ltd	BBC Media Applications Technologies Ltd	Oct 4, 2018	
2MD VR Football	Truant pixel, LLC	Truant pixel, LLC	Sep 26, 2017	
3D Organon VR Anatomy	Medis Media	Medis Media	Dec 9, 2016	
3DMark	Futuremark	Futuremark		
4D Toys	mtb design works, inc.	mtb design works, inc.	Jun 2, 2017	
4089: Ghost Within	Phr00ts Software	Phr00ts Software	Jan 9, 2015	
5089: The Action RPG	Phr00t's Software	Phr00t's Software	Feb 3, 2016	
8i - Make VR Human	8i	8i	Apr 18, 2016	
10 Cupcakes	Repulse	SZH	Sep 15, 2017 (demo)	
A Chair in a Room : Greenwater	Wolf & Wood Interactive Ltd	Wolf & Wood Interactive Ltd	Apr 5, 2016	
A Fisherman's Tale	Innerspace VR	Vertigo Games	Jan, 2019	
A Handful of Keflings	NinjaBee	NinjaBee	Jan 25, 2018	
A Haunting : Witching Hour	Enyx Studios	Enyx Studios	Oct 31, 2017	
A Legend of Luca	Legend Studio	Legend Studio	Apr 5, 2016	
A Show of Kindness	Google	Google	Nov 15, 2018	
A Story of Distress	Yellow Panda Games	Yellow Panda Games	Apr 2, 2018	
A Tale of Pirates: a Dummy Mutiny	Studio Clangore	Cranio Creations Digital	May 23, 2018	
A Writer And His Daughter	Dimfrost	Dimfrost	Nov 2, 2017	
A-10	Futuretown	Futuretown	Apr 5, 2016	
Abbot's Book Demo	The Abbot's Book, LLC	Blackthorn Media, LLC	Apr 4, 2016	
ABE VR	Hammerhead VR	Hammerhead VR	Jun 23, 2016	
Adr1ft	THREE ONE ZERO	505 Games	Jul 28, 2016	
Ad Exitum	Since Idea Games	Since Idea Games	May 13, 2016	
Adventure Time: Magic Man's Head Games	Turbo Button	Cartoon Network	Apr 5, 2016	
Albino Lullaby: Episode 1	Ape Law	Ape Law	Apr 5, 2016	
A Legend of Luca	Legend Studio	Legend Studio	Apr 5, 2016	
AltspaceVR	AltspaceVR, Inc.	AltspaceVR, Inc.	Mar 31, 2016	
Always Higher	AntiAnti	AntiAnti	Jul 21, 2016	
Ancient VR coaster	Crovax Studios	Crovax Studios	Jul 4, 2016	
Andromedum	Imbanova Entertainment Inc.	Imbanova Entertainment Inc.	Apr 15, 2016	
Annie Amber	Pantumaca Barcelona, @CarlosGameDev	Talking About Media	Jun 17, 2016	
Anomalie	Krush Technologies	Krush Technologies	May 27, 2016	
Apollo 11	Immersive VR Education Ltd.	Immersive VR Education Ltd.	Apr 5, 2016	
Arachnophobia	IgnisVR	IgnisVR	Jun 1, 2016	
Arizona Sunshine	Vertigo Games, Jaywalkers Interactive	Vertigo Games	Dec 6, 2016	
Ark Park				
Armed Against the Undead	Unity3d.College	Unity3d.College	Jun 17, 2016	
Ascension VR	Temple Gates Games	Temple Gates Games	Aug 1, 2016	
The Assembly VR Unlock	nDreams	nDreams	Jul 19, 2016	
Assetto Corsa	Kunos Simulazioni	Kunos Simulazioni	Dec 19, 2014	
Astral Domine	Spectral Illusions	Spectral Illusions	May 1, 2016	
Astroderps	Chronos VR	Chronos VR	Jun 17, 2016	
Atlas Reactor VR Character Viewer	Trion Worlds	Trion Worlds	Apr 5, 2016	
Audio Arena	Skydome Studios	Skydome Studios	Jul 25, 2016	
Audioshield	Dylan Fitterer	Dylan Fitterer	Apr 5, 2016	
Babel: Tower to the Gods	Ruce	Ruce	Apr 5, 2016	
Bank Limit: Advanced Battle Racing	Tastee Beverage Studios, LLC	Tastee Beverage Studios, LLC	Aug 16, 2016	
BARBAR BAR	Bartoš Studio s.r.o., TEDI Games	Bartoš Studio s.r.o.	Jun 2, 2017	
Baskhead	VRLINES	VRLINES	Jul 19, 2016	
Battle Dome	QuinnTeq	QuinnTeq	Jun 8, 2016	
Bazaar	Temple Gates Games	Temple Gates Games	Mar 28, 2016	
Beach Ball Valley	Paul Eckhardt	Paul Eckhardt	Apr 5, 2016	
Beat Ninja	Xelphyre Games	Xelphyre Games	Jul 12, 2016	
Beat Saber	Beat Games	Beat Games	May 1, 2018	
Bellybots	Grumpy Company GmbH	Grumpy Company GmbH	Jul 26, 2016	
BigScreen Beta	BigScreen, Inc.	BigScreen, Inc.	Apr 28, 2016	
Blade and Sorcery	WarpFrog	WarpFrog	TBA/Dec 11, 2018	
Blasters of the Universe	The Secret Location	The Secret Location	Jul 14, 2016	
bloxyz	Svution	Svution	May 19, 2016	
TheBlu	WEVR Inc.	WEVR Inc.	Apr 5, 2016	
Book Of Merlin	LekeGame	LekeGame	Jul 22, 2016	
Bounce	Steel Wool Studios	Steel Wool Studios	Nov. 30, 2016	
Bowl VR	Carbon Fiber Games	Carbon Fiber Games	Jun 24, 2016	
Bowslinger	Pompaduo	Pompaduo	Apr 5, 2016	
Brick Stack VR	Andrew French	Andrew French	Jul 26, 2016	
The Brookhaven Experiment	Phosphor Games	Phosphor Games	Jul 5, 2016	
Broomball VR	Rushil Reddy, Priyam Parikh, Ken Watanabe	Broomball Inc.	Jul 28, 2016	
Budget Cuts	Neat Corporation	Neat Corporation	Jun 14, 2018	
Caffeine	Incandescent Imaging	Incandescent Imaging	Oct 12, 2015	
Candy Smash VR	Wadup Games	Wadup Games	Jul 26, 2016	
Capria: Magic of the Elements	HORN & IVRY	HORN & IVRY	Apr 5, 2016	
Car Car Crash Hands On Edition	Chocolatefudge Games	Chocolatefudge Games	Jul 4, 2016	
Carpe Lucem - Seize The Light VR	Hammer Labs	Application Systems Heidelberg	Apr 5, 2016	
CDF: Starfighter VR	Shaun Williams	MAG Studios	Apr 5, 2016	
Celestrion	dSky9, Inc.	dSky9, Inc.	Dec 7, 2015	
Chamber 19	Deepak M., Grant B.	Deepak M., Grant B.	May 23, 2016	
ChessVR	games.Sharbit	games.Sharbit	Jul 7, 2016	
Chunks	Facepunch Studios	Facepunch Studios	Apr 12, 2016	
CINEVEO - VR Cinema	Sven Kohn	Mindprobe Labs	May 15, 2016	
City Z	Little Cloud Games	Little Cloud Games	Apr 29, 2016	
Cloudborn	Logtown Studios	Logtown Studios	Sep 26, 2017	
Cloudlands: VR Minigolf	Futuretown	Futuretown	Apr 5, 2016	
Cloudrift	friendlyOctopus	friendlyOctopus	Oct 30, 2015	
The Collider 2	Shortbreak Studios s.c.	Shortbreak Studios s.c.	Apr 19, 2016	
Colosse	Colosse Team	Fire Panda Ltd.	Apr 20, 2016	
Constricting Cubes	D.W.S.	D.W.S.	Oct 28, 2016	
Cosmic Trip	Funktronic Labs	Funktronic Labs	Apr 15, 2016	
Crashed Lander	Don Whitaker	Brain Blinks	Jun 17, 2014	
Crazy Machines 3	FAKT Software	Daedalic Entertainment	Oct 18, 2016	
Crystal Rift	Psytec Games Ltd	Psytec Games Ltd	Mar 30, 2016	
C.S.S. CITADEL VR	Winged Minds	Winged Minds	Jul 15, 2016	
The Cubicle.	Roel van Beek, Jurgen Hoogeboom, Joppe de Graaf, Jesper van den Ende	Jespertheend	Apr 5, 2016	
Cyber Pong Vr	Colopl Nl	Colopl Nl	Apr 28, 2016	
Dawn of the Robot Empire	oeFun, Inc.	oeFun, Inc.	Apr 11, 2016	
DCS World	Eagle Dynamics	The Fighter Collection	Mar 18, 2013	
Descent: Underground	Descendent Studios	Descendent Studios	Apr 5, 2016	
Destinations	Valve	Valve	Jun 9, 2016	
Destinations Workshop Tools	Valve	Valve		
Dimensional	Brett Jackson	Head Start Design	Jul 1, 2016	
Diorama No.1: Blocked In	The Shoebox Diorama (Daniel Ernst)	The Shoebox Diorama	Apr 5, 2016	
Diorama No.3: The Marchland	The Shoebox Diorama (Daniel Ernst)	The Shoebox Diorama	Apr 5, 2016	
Directionless	Zach Tsiakalis-Brown	Zach Tsiakalis-Brown	May 31, 2016	
Discovr Egypt: King Tut's Tomb	Discovr Labs	Discovr Labs	Apr 11, 2016	
Disney Movies VR	Walt Disney Studios	Disney Interactive	May 16, 2016	
The Divergent Series: Allegiant VR	Wevr Inc, Big Red Button Entertainment	Summit Entertainment LLC	Mar 17, 2016	
Doctor Kvorak's Obliteration Game	Freekstorm	Freekstorm	Aug 29, 2016	
Dogfight Elite	Echoboom S.L.	Echoboom S.L.	Jul 11, 2016	
Dolphin Defense	Tanner Thayer	Tanner Thayer	May 16, 2016	
Doom VFR	id Software	Bethesda Softworks	Nov 30, 2017	
Dota 2	Valve	Valve	Jul 9, 2013	
Draco Dux	BraveDev	BraveDev	TBA	
Dream Golf VR	Isaac Stearns	Isaac Stearns	Nov 3, 2017	
DreamLand	SandVUE	SANPACE	Jul 7, 2016	
DrumKit VR	0o0	0o0	Jul 6, 2016	
Dungeon Hero	Grzegorz Slazinski	Grzegorz Slazinski	Jul 7, 2015	
Eagle Flight	Ubisoft	Ubisoft Montreal	Oct 18, 2016	
Eclipse — Defending the motherland	Hangzhou NezhaGames	Hangzhou NezhaGames	May 26, 2016	
Egg Time	Bartoš Studio	TEDI Games	Sep 19, 2016	
Egg Time 2	Bartoš Studio	Bartoš Studio	May 7, 2018	
Elite Dangerous: Arena	Frontier Developments	Frontier Developments	Feb 16, 2016	
Elite: Dangerous	Frontier Developments	Frontier Developments	Dec 16, 2014	
Elite Dangerous: Horizons Season Pass	Frontier Developments	Frontier Developments	Dec 15, 2015	
Emergence Fractal Universe	Paul Wand	17th Dimension	Jul 20, 2016	
Emily Wants to Play	Shawn Hitchcock	SKH Apps LLC	Dec 10, 2015	
ESSENCE	ONEVISION GAMES	ONEVISION GAMES	Apr 18, 2017	
Euclidean	Alpha Wave Entertainment	AAD Productions	Sep 25, 2015	
EVEREST VR	Sólfar Studios, RVX	Sólfar Studios	Aug 2, 2016	
Eve: Valkyrie	CCP Games	CCP Games	Mar 28, 2016	
Fallout 4 VR	Bethesda Games Studios	Bethesda Softworks	Dec 12, 2017	
Fantastic Contraption	Northway Games	Radial Games	Apr 5, 2016	
FATED: The Silent Oath	Frima Studio	Frima Originals	Apr 28, 2016	
Felt Tip Circus	Alpha Wave Entertainment	AAD Productions	Apr 5, 2016	
Final Approach	Phaser Lock Interactive	Phaser Lock Interactive	Apr 5, 2016	
Final Strike	Ghost Machine	Ghost Machine	Jun 23, 2016	
Five Nights at Freddy's: Help Wanted	Steel Wool Studios	Lionsgate Games/ScottGames	May 28, 2019	
The FOO Show featuring Will Smith	FOO VR, Inc.	FOO VR, Inc.	Apr 5, 2016	
Football VR	Revive Studios	Revive Studios	Jul 12, 2016	
Frankenstein: Beyond the Time	The Dust S.A.	The Dust S.A.	Aug 1, 2018	
Fruit Golf	Coal Car Studio Ltd.	Coal Car Studio Ltd.	TBA	
Fruit Ninja VR	Halfbrick Studios	Halfbrick Studios	Jul 7, 2016	
FTC Workshop Tool	Alpha Wave Entertainment	AAD Productions	Jun 28, 2016	
Fujii	Funktronic Labs	Funktronic Labs	Aug 16, 2019	
The Gallery: Six Elements - Ep 1: Call of the Starseed	Cloudhead Games	Cloudhead Games	Apr 5, 2016	
Garage Drummer VR	Blazing Tree Studio	Blazing Tree Studio	Jun 21, 2016	
Geo-Fall	Argeus Games	Argeus Games	Jul 23, 2016	
Ghost Train VR	JDMSoftware	JDMSoftware	Jul 5, 2016	
Giant Cop: Justice Above All	Other Ocean Interactive	Other Ocean Interactive	May 30, 2017	
Glaive	Nest Egg Games, LLC	Nest Egg Games, LLC	Jul 26, 2016	
Golf Masters	Ghost Machine	Ghost Machine	TBA	
The Grand Canyon VR Experience	Immersive Entertainment, Inc.	Immersive Entertainment, Inc.	Oct 9, 2015	
Gravity Compass	NovaWake Studios	NovaWake Studios	May 7, 2016	
Grav|Lab - Gravitational Testing Facility & Observations	Mark Schramm	Mark Schramm	Oct 21, 2016	
GravPool	TinyCrease	TinyCrease	Aug 29, 2016	
Grove - VR Browsing Experience	Mure VR	Mure VR	Apr 12, 2016	
Gumball Drift	Ghost Machine	Ghost Machine	Apr 5, 2016	
Gunjack	CCP	CCP	Apr 5, 2016	
Gun Range VR	Jeffrey Cretin	Limited Resources	Jul 22, 2016	
Gunslinger - Cowboy Shooting Challenge	GameAnax Inc	GameAnax Inc	Jul 22, 2017	
HALP!	Fun Bits	Fun Bits	Aug 1, 2016	
Heaven Island Life	Fabio Ferrara	Chubby Pixel	Apr 20, 2016	
Holodance	narayana games	narayana games	Apr 5, 2016	
Holodaze	Sysdia Games	Sysdia Games	May 19, 2016	
Holopoint	Alzan Studios, LLC	Alzan Studios, LLC	Apr 4, 2016	
Home Improvisation: Furniture Sandbox	The Stork Burnt Down	The Stork Burnt Down	Jul 28, 2016	
Hoops VR	Wizard Games Inc	Wizard Games Inc	Jun 20, 2016	
HordeZ	ZenVR	ZenVR	Apr 29, 2016	
The Horus Heresy: Betrayal at Calth	Steel Wool Studios	Steel Wool Studios	Dec, 2017	
House of Alice	Cuddles and Snowflake	Cuddles and Snowflake	Jul 11, 2016	
Hover Junkers	Stress Level Zero	Stress Level Zero	Apr 5, 2016	
Hot Dogs, Horseshoes & Hand Grenades	RUST LTD	RUST LTD	Apr 5, 2016	
House of the Dying Sun	Marauder Interactive, LLC	Marauder Interactive, LLC	Jun 7, 2016	
Human, we have a problem	Enrick Lambert	Enrick Lambert	Jul 5, 2016	
Hyper Bowling VR	Blaze Forward Games	Blaze Forward Games	May 11, 2016	
IKEA VR Experience	IKEA Communications AB	IKEA Communications AB	Apr 5, 2016	
IL-2 Sturmovik: Great Battles	1C Game Studios	1C Game Studios	Nov 19, 2013	
Inbound	Gyoza games	Gyoza games	Jul 5, 2016	
InCell VR	Nival VR	Nival	Sep 3, 2015	
InMind VR	Nival VR	Nival	Jan 19, 2015	
Insane Decay of Mind	GoManga Interactive	Merge Games, IV Productions	May 6, 2016	
iOMoon	Headtrip Games llc	Headtrip Games llc	Apr 27, 2016	
Irrational Exuberance: Prologue	Buffalo Vision	Buffalo Vision	Apr 5, 2016	
IrreVRsible	Raptor-Lab	Raptor-Lab	May 24, 2016	
Jaunt VR	Jaunt Inc.	Jaunt Inc.	Apr 5, 2016	
Jeeboman	Futuretown	Futuretown	Apr 5, 2016	
Job Simulator	Owlchemy Labs	Owlchemy Labs	Apr 5, 2016	
JUMP	Endeavor One Inc.	Endeavor One Inc.	Jul 30, 2015	
Jupiteration	Bartoš Studio s.r.o.	Bartoš Studio s.r.o.	Mar 10, 2017	
Keep Talking and Nobody Explodes	Steel Crate Games	Steel Crate Games	Apr 5, 2016	
Kingspray Graffiti Simulator	Anomis, Dank, Weevilman	Kingspray	Dec 7, 2016	
Kismet	Psyop	Psyop	May 2, 2016	
Klepto	Meerkat Gaming	Meerkat Gaming	Jun 30, 2016	
Kodon	Tenk Labs	Tenk Labs	Jun 3, 2016	
KOTH	Abbeytek Ltd	Abbeytek Ltd	Sep, 2016	
Kumoon: Ballistic Physics Puzzle	Lucky You Studio	Lucky You Studio	Nov 10, 2015	
The Lab	Valve	Valve	Apr 5, 2016	
Lantern	Storm in a Teacup	1C Company	Nov, 2016	
L.A. Noire: The VR Case Files	Team Bondi/Rockstar Games	Rockstar Games	Dec 15, 2017	
La Peri	Innerspace VR	Innerspace VR	Apr 5, 2016	
Leave The Nest	Kaio Interactive	Kaio Interactive	May 27, 2016	
Lecture VR	Immersive VR Education Ltd.	Immersive VR Education Ltd.	Mar 15, 2016	
Legend of Dungeon	Robot Loves Kitty	Robot Loves Kitty	Sep 13, 2013	
Light And Dance	Hermann Fischer	Hermann Fischer	Mar 03, 2017	
Light Repair Team #4	Eerie Bear Games	Eerie Bear Games	Apr 5, 2016	
Littlstar VR Cinema	Little Star Media Inc.	Little Star Media Inc.	Oct 22, 2016	
Lost Route	Imbanova Entertainment Inc.	Imbanova Entertainment Inc.	Jun 17, 2016	
Lucid Trips	VR Nerds	VR Nerds	Jan 12, 2017	
L U N E	Isaac Cohen	Isaac Cohen	Jun 20, 2016	
MageWorks	Earthborn Interactive, LLC	Earthborn Interactive, LLC	Jul 22, 2016	
Marble Mountain	Lightning Rock	Lightning Rock	Apr 5, 2016	
Maze Roller	Meerkat Gaming	Meerkat Gaming	Aug 23, 2016	
Mars Odyssey	Steel Wool Studios	Steel Wool Studios	Sep 9, 2016	
Mervils: A VR Adventure	VitruviusVR	VitruviusVR	Aug 4, 2016	
Metaverse Construction Kit	Metaware	Metaware	Dec 6, 2015	
Metro Warp	Another Yeti	Another Yeti	Aug 5, 2015	
Mind OVR Matter	Joe Chatfield	Joe Chatfield	Jun 20, 2016	
MIND: Path to Thalamus Enhanced Edition	Pantumaca Barcelona, @CarlosGameDev, Dani Navarro, Luka Nieto	Talking About Media	Nov 3, 2015	
Mind Unleashed	Frost Earth	IV Productions, Merge Games	May 5, 2016	
Minigame Party VR	Scornz	Scornz	Apr 5, 2016	
Minigolf VR	Virtualex	Virtualex	Apr 5, 2016	
Modbox	Alien Trap	Alien Trap	Apr 5, 2016	
Mutato Match	Emerald Activities	Coming Soon!	Jun 16, 2016	
Muv-Luv VR	Degica, ixtl	Degica	Jun 16, 2016	
MyDream Swift	MyDream Interactive, Inc	MyDream Interactive, Inc	Apr 11, 2016	
My Own Pet	JDMSoftware	JDMSoftware	Jul 19, 2016	
Nanome	Nanome Inc.	Nanome Inc.	Aug 29, 2016	
NEKOPALIVE	NEKO WORKs	Sekai Project	May 31, 2016	
The Nest	invrse studios	invrse studios	Jun 14, 2016	
New Retro Arcade: Neon	Digital Cybercherries	Digital Cybercherries	Aug 1, 2016	
The Night Cafe: A VR Tribute to Vincent Van Gogh	Borrowed Light Studios	Borrowed Light Studios	Jun 3, 2016	
Nighttime Terror VR: Dessert Defender	Mark Schramm	Mark Schramm	Apr 4, 2016	
No Limits 2 Roller Coaster Simulator	Ole Lang	Mad Data	Jun 8, 2016	
Observatory: A VR Variety Pack	2DArray	2DArray	May 12, 2016	
Octoshield VR	Liana Pigeot	Liana Pigeot	Jun 15, 2016	
Omega Agent	Fireproof Games	Fireproof Games	May 4, 2016	
Omni	Warhead Entertainment	Warhead Entertainment	TBA	
Onward	Downpour Interactive	Downpour Interactive	Aug, 2016	
Orbital Strike: Arena	Sandglass Games LLC	Sandglass Games LLC	Jul 12, 2016	
Orb Labs, Inc.	Next Friday Interactive	Next Friday Interactive	Jun 11, 2018	
Orc Assault	Ghost Machine	Ghost Machine	May 10, 2016	
Orc Hunter VR	Orc Hunter Developer Team	Orc Hunter Developer Team	Jul 24, 2017	
Out of Ammo	Rocketwerks	RocketWerks	Apr 15, 2016	
Paintey	Brian Lindenhof	ShadowBrain Games	Apr 18, 2016	
PaintLab	LAB4242	LAB4242	Apr 29, 2016	
The Path of Greatest Resistance	RealityRig	RealityRig	Jul 12, 2016	
Perfect Angle VR - Zen edition	Ivanovich Games	Ivanovich Games	Jun 8, 2016	
Periodonica	Jumping Llamas	Jumping Llamas	May 6, 2016	
Pierhead Arcade	Mechabit Ltd.	Mechabit Ltd.	Apr 5, 2016	
Ping Pong Waves VR	Hamzeh Alsalhi	Hamzeh Alsalhi	Jun 20, 2016	
PITCH-HIT: Rampage Level	JJ Castillo, Fox Buchele, Chris Mahoney	Viewer Ready	Apr 4, 2016	
PlanetFate	Aaron Matthies	Aaron Matthies	Jun 6, 2016	
PolyDome	Plan8	Plan8	Aug 9, 2016	
Poly Runner VR	Lucid Sight, Inc.	Lucid Sight, Inc.	Apr 18, 2016	
Pong Champion VR	DegaSolutions	DegaSolutions	Jul 26, 2016	
Pool Nation VR	Cherry Pop Games, Perilous Orbit	Cherry Pop Games, Perilous Orbit	Jun 1, 2016	
Steampuff: Phinnegan's Factory	Mr. Anderson	Steelhouse	Jul 28, 2016	
Polynomial 2	Dmytry lavrov	Dmytry lavrov	May 31, 2016	
Portal Stories: VR	Prism Studios	Prism Studios	May 16, 2016	
PresenZ	Nozon	Nozon	Apr 28, 2016	
Project CARS	Slightly Mad Studios	Slightly Mad Studios; Bandai Namco Entertainment	May 12, 2016	
Project Cars 2	Slightly Mad Studios	Slightly Mad Studios; Bandai Namco Entertainment	Sep 22, 2017	
Proton Pulse	Justin Moravetz, Jake Kaufman	ZeroTransform	Apr 5, 2016	
Protonwar	Outer Planet Studios	Outer Planet Studios	Jul 5, 2016	
Psychonauts in the Rhombus of Ruin	Double Fine Productions	Double Fine Productions	Apr 19, 2018	
Push For Emor	Lupus Solus Studio	Lupus Solus Studio	Oct 24, 2016	
Puzzle Blocks	Ayy Caramba Games	Ayy Caramba Games	Jul 22, 2016	
Quar: The Battle for Gate 18	Steel Wool Studios	Steel Wool Studios	Apr 4, 2016	
QuiVr	Blueteak	Blueteak	Jun 18, 2018	
Radial G: racing Evolved	Tammeka games	Tameka games	Apr 5, 2016	
Rail Adventures	exosyphen studios	exosyphen studios	TBA	
Raw Data	Survios	Survios	Jul 14, 2016	
Realities	realities.io	realities.io	Apr 5, 2016	
Rec Room	Against Gravity	Against Gravity	Jun 28, 2016	
Ricerca VR	The Family, LLC, Yo-Yo Lin, William Paul Cowan Jr., Mike Murdock, Neilson K-S	The Family, LLC	May 1, 2016	
Richie's Plank Experience	Richard Eastes, Toni Eastes, Daniel Todorov	Toast VR	Dec 10, 2017	
Rick and Morty Simulator: Virtual Rick-ality	Owlchemy Labs	Adult Swim	Apr 20, 2017	
Rogue Fighter	Zane Gittins	Zane Gittins	Jul 22, 2016	
RollerGirls From Beyond	Stonepunk Studios	Stonepunk Studios	Jul 27, 2016	
The Rose and I	Eugene Chung, Jimmy Maidens, Terry Kaleas	Penrose Studios	Apr 5, 2016	
Ruckus Ridge VR Party	Foreignvr	Foreignvr	Apr 5, 2016	
Rumpus	Luke Iannini	Luke Iannini	Jul 4, 2016	
Russian VR Coasters	Funny Twins	Funny Twins	Jul 27, 2016	
SaberSaw VR	James Oliver	Destined	Aug 11, 2016	
Sairento VR	Mixed Realms	Mixed Realms	Dec 21, 2016	
Sayonara Umihara Kawase	Studio Saizensen	Degica	Oct 6, 2015	
SculptrVR	Nathan Rowe	SculptrVR	Apr 4, 2016	
#SelfieTennis	VRUnicorns	Bandello, Devolver Digital	Apr 1, 2016	
Serious Sam VR: The Last Hope	Croteam VR	Devolver Digital, Croteam	Oct 17, 2016 Early Access	
ShowdownVR	Frontseat Studio	Frontseat Studio	Sep 19, 2016	
Simple VR Video Player	simplevr.pro	simplevr.pro	Jul 19, 2016	
Sisters	Otherworld Interactive	Otherworld Interactive	TBA	
Slam	Aera Studios	Aera Studios	Jul 11, 2016	
The Slingshot VR	Funny Twins	Funny Twins	Jul 6, 2016	
Skeet: VR Target Shooting	Flatbox Studios	Flatbox Studios LLC	Apr 5, 2016	
Sketchfab VR	Sketchfab	Sketchfab	May 13, 2016	
Sky Tower	Animootor	Animootor	Apr 25, 2016	
Skyworld	Vertigo Games, Wolfdog Interactive	Vertigo Games	Oct 17, 2017	
Smell Of Death	Alkame Games	Alkame Games	Jul 4, 2016	
The Solus Project	Hourences, Grip Games	Teotl Studios	Jun 7, 2016	
Soundstage	Logan Olson	Logan Olson	Jul 7, 2016	
Space Bit Attack	Lucid Sight, Inc.	Lucid Sight, Inc.	Apr 5, 2016	
Space Pirate Trainer	I-Illusions	I-Illusions	Apr 5, 2016	
Space, VR!	James Nye, Copeland Williams	Self	Jul 26, 2016	
Spell Fighter VR	Kubold	Kubold	Mar 1, 2016	
Spells 'n' Stuff	Luke Haney, Jim Cook	Luke Haney	Apr 4, 2016	
Spermination	Phr00t's Software	Phr00t's Software	Apr 29, 2016	
Starbear: Taxi	Funktronic Labs	Funktronic Labs	May 3, 2018	
Star Chart	Escapist Games Ltd	Escape Velocity Limited	Sep 5, 2016	
Stars	MatrixStudio	MatrixStudio	Jul 19, 2016	
Stealth Labyrinth	Reddoll Srl	IV Productions, Merge Games	Apr 29, 2016	
SteamHammerVR - The Rogue Apprentice	GamestormVR	Showstorm Ltd	Jan 20, 2017	
Stonehenge VR	VoyagerVR	VoyagerVR	Oct 10, 2017	
Storm VR	UNIT9	UNIT9	Sep 23, 2016	
Subnautica	Unknown Worlds Entertainment	Unknown Worlds Entertainment	Dec, 2014	
Surge	House of Secrets	House of Secrets	May 19, 2016	
Surgeon Simulator VR: Meet The Medic	Bossa Studios	Bossa Studios	Apr 5, 2016	
SurrealVR	Surreal Games	Surreal Games	Apr 15, 2016	
SurviVR - Castle Defender	ioi Games	ioi Games	Apr, 2019	
Sweet Escape VR	Monster VR	Monster VR	Apr 20, 2016	
Table Tennis VR	Blue Entropy Studios	Blue Entropy Studios	Jul 6, 2016	
Tabletop Simulator	Berserk Games	Berserk Games	Apr 5, 2016	
Theme Park Studio	Pantera Entertainment	Pantera Entertainment	Feb 27, 2014	
Think Space	Funly, Inc.	Funly, Inc.	Jul 26, 2016	
The Thrill of the Fight: VR boxing	Ian Fitz	Ian Fitz	Jul 1, 2016	
The Torus Syndicate	Codeate LLC	Codeate LLC	Nov 22, 2016	
Thunderbird	Innervision Games	Innervision Games	Dec 6, 2016	
Tilt Brush	Google	Google	Apr 5, 2016	
Titans of Space 2.0	DrashVR LLC	DrashVR LLC	Apr 5, 2016	
Time Machine VR	Minority Media	Minority Media	May 23, 2016	
Tower Island: Explore, Discover and Disassemble	Team of Light Mecia LLC	Team of Light Mecia LLC	Jul 26, 2016	
Toy Plane Heroes	Oasis VR	Oasis VR	Apr 5, 2016	
Trials on Tatooine	ILMxLAB	ILMxLAB	Jul 18, 2016	
TrumPiñata	KittyPup Productions	JH Dinsdale LTD	Jul 22, 2016	
Ultimate Booster Experience	GexagonVR	GexagonVR	Apr 16, 2016	
Unbreakable Vr Runner	Miikka Åsnabrygg	Miikka Åsnabrygg	Jul 4, 2016	
UNCORPOREAL - "Alcatraz Island Lofts"	Uncorporeal Systems	Uncorporeal Systems	Jul 20, 2016	
UNCORPOREAL - "Fluffy!"	Uncorporeal Systems	Uncorporeal Systems	Jul 13, 2016	
Universe Sandbox	Giant Army	Giant Army	Apr 5, 2016	
Unseen Diplomacy	Triangular Pixels	Triangular Pixels	Apr 5, 2016	
Valiant	Offpeak Games	Offpeak Games	May 2, 2016	
Tengutana	Bartoš Studio s.r.o.	Bartoš Studio s.r.o.	Oct 26, 2017	
The Vanishing of Ethan Carter VR	The Astronauts	The Astronauts	Mar 31, 2016	
Vanishing Realms	Indimo Labs LLC	Indimo Labs LLC	Apr 5, 2016	
V ARRRR	Blackjard Studios	Blackjard Studios	Jun 10, 2016	
Vector 36	Red River Studios	Red River Studios	Apr 15, 2016	
VeeR Pong	Ian Slattery	Ian Slattery	Jul 19, 2016	
'n Verlore Verstand	Skobbejak Games	Skobbejak Games	Feb 1, 2016	
Vertigo	Zach Tsiakalis-Brown, George Eracleous, Errol Bucy	Zach Tsiakalis-Brown	Dec 22, 2016	
Vintage VR	Dunderware	MuseumSyndicate.com	May 2, 2016	
Virtual Desktop	Guy Godin	Guy Godin	Mar 31, 2016	
VIRTUAnimator	Pheonise	Pheonise	May 9, 2016	
VirZOOM Arcade	VirZOOM	VirZOOM	Jun 30, 2016	
The Visitor	Stephen Long	Stephen Long	Apr 1, 2016	
Vistascapes VR	Bird Man Games	Bird Man Games	Jul 8, 2016	
ViveSpray	Ian Slattery	Ian Slattery	Jul 19, 2016	
Vivecraft	jrbudda	Open Source	July 24, 2016	
Voyeur VR	Janssens Dynamic	Janssens Dynamic	Dec 22, 2016	
vrAMP	Oriku Inc	Oriku Inc	May 27, 2016	
VR Baseball	Unity3D.College	Unity3D.College	Apr 4, 2016	
VR Battle Grid	Fred Sauer	Fred Sauer	Jul 13, 2016	
VR Boxing Workout	Wenkly Studio Sp. z o.o.	Wenkly Studio Sp. z o.o.	Jul 10, 2016	
VR Disc Golf	FRS Game Studio	Front Range Software, LLC	Jul 18, 2016	
VReakout	Animate Objects	Animate Objects	Jul 13, 2016	
VR Fractals	Phylliida	Phylliida	Jul 22, 2016	
Nvidia VR Funhouse	Nvidia Lightspeed Studios	Nvidia Lightspeed Studios	Jul 14, 2016	
Vrideo	Vrideo, Inc.	Vrideo, Inc.	Apr 8, 2016	
VR Kanojo	Illusion	Illusion	Feb 28, 2017	
VRMark	Futuremark	Futuremark	Nov 3, 2016	
VRMark Preview	Futuremark	Futuremark	Dec 18, 2015	
VRMultigames	Mad Triangles	Mad Triangles	Jul 25, 2016	
VROOM: Aerie	VROOM	VROOM	May 13, 2016	
VRporize - VR FPS	Mercury Aerospace Industries	Mercury Aerospace Industries	Jul 8, 2016	
VR Regatta	MarineVerse	MarineVerse	Jul 14, 2016	
VR Shooter Guns	Cykyria	Cykyria	Sep 7, 2017	
VR Squash 2017	David Cseh	David Cseh	Nov 21, 2017	
VR:Vacate the Room	Heiko Ihde	Heiko Ihde	Jul 15, 2016	
VR zGame	StormBringer Studios OU	StormBringer Studios OU	Jun 9, 2016	
Waddle Home	Archiact Interactive Ltd.	Archiact Interactive Ltd.	Jul 7, 2016	
The Wake	INVRSE	INVRSE	Jul 4, 2017	
Waltz of the Wizard	Aldin Dynamics	Aldin Dynamics	May 31, 2016	
War Thunder	Gaijin Entertainment	Gaijin Entertainment	Apr 5, 2016	
Waterbears VR	Schell Games	Schell Games	Apr 5, 2016	
Wevr Transport	Wevr, Inc.	Wevr, Inc.	Apr 5, 2016	
Whirligig	Philip Day	Philip Day	Apr 4, 2016	
Wildlife VR	Rocket Science Club	Rocket Science Club	Jul 10, 2016	
Windlands	Psytec Games Ltd	Psytec Games Ltd	Apr 5, 2016	
The Wire	LekeGame	LekeGame	Jul 30, 2016	
Within	Within Unlimited, Inc.	Within Unlimited, Inc.	Jun 16, 2016	
World of Diving	Vertigo Games	Vertigo Games	Aug 26, 2014	
XLR	Metaware Limited, LLC	Metaware Limited, LLC	Apr 5, 2016	
Yon Paradox	Digital Mantis	IV Productions, Merge Games	May 6, 2016	
Zenblade	Atomic VR Inc.	Atomic VR Inc.	Apr 29, 2016	
Zero-G VR	Linkus Studio	Linkus Studio	Jun 15, 2016	
Zombie Training Simulator	Accelerato	Accelerato	Apr 15, 2016	

== See also ==
- List of Oculus Rift games
- List of Oculus Quest games
- List of PlayStation VR games
