= Maquette (video game) =

2021 video game

- Developer: Graceful Decay
- Publisher: Annapurna Interactive
- Platforms: PlayStation 4; PlayStation 5; Windows; Nintendo Switch; Xbox One; Xbox Series X/S
- Release: PS4, PS5, Windows; March 2, 2021; Switch; May 25, 2023; Xbox One, Series X/S; July 19, 2023
- Genre: Puzzle-platform
- Mode: Single-player

Maquette is a puzzle-adventure video game developed by Graceful Decay and published by Annapurna Interactive. The game takes place in a recursive world where every action on a table is recreated in the larger area outside. The game was released in March 2021 for PlayStation 4, PlayStation 5, and Windows, with a version for Nintendo Switch as well as Xbox One and Xbox Series X/S launching in May and July 2023, respectively.

== Gameplay ==
The player controls a person reliving a past relationship, solving puzzles to progress through memories. The game's story is told through voiced dialogue and notes scattered throughout the world. The relationship dialogue of Kenzie and Michael is voiced by Bryce Dallas Howard and husband Seth Gabel. Every chapter, the player enters a new environment. In the center of that environment there is a table. When placing objects from the game's world onto the table, that action is mirrored in the world outside. Using this, the player places objects in order to access new areas or find items to solve puzzles.

== Development ==
During development, the game's story was originally about a character trapped in a dungeon by a wizard. After a few years of production, the project lead felt uninspired by it, and rewrote it into a love story.

== Reception ==
Reception

Aggregate score
Aggregator	Score
Metacritic	PC: 71/100; PS5: 70/100

Review scores
Publication	Score
Electronic Gaming Monthly	3/5
Game Informer	7.75/10
IGN	7/10
Jeuxvideo.com	15/20
PC Gamer (US)	73/100

Maquette received mostly positive reviews from critics, who praised its world, but criticized its simplistic puzzles and story. It received "mixed or average reviews" according to review aggregator, Metacritic.

Eurogamer praised the recursive world of Maquette, writing, "Solving these puzzles is, mostly, a delight. The brilliance of that basic principle lingers... there's more emphasis on step-by-step logic here, and less on tricks of perception. It's cleverly twisted and re-presented in slightly different forms". Rock Paper Shotgun enjoyed the game's puzzle mechanics, but disliked the story of the game, feeling that it was filled with tropes and poor writing. "Everything is so idyllic, and predictable, and I am convinced no human has ever had a relationship like Michael and Kenzie." IGN liked the presentation of the game, saying "Its use of vibrant colors and ornate, warped architecture is some of the most beautiful I’ve seen in any puzzle game. Those impressive aesthetics also extend into its otherworldly particle effects as objects phase in or out of place, as well as its top-notch audio design".

While enjoying the protagonists' banter, PCGamer criticized the puzzle design in context of the game's mechanics, "I also found myself trudging back and forth through a barren plain of nothingness to finetune the exact position of a miniature staircase. The galactic proportions Grateful Decay is working with don't mesh well with rote, adventure-game tedium". Polygon liked the way the world was presented in the context of a relationship, "how unevenly people fall in and out of love, provide contrast for the fantastical game world — the space Michael and Kenzie built together and in which they hold themselves up. Their relationship shatters for seemingly small reasons, but in their intimate world, the details loom so much larger". Game Informer praised the intricacies of the world of Maquette, but disliked some of the solutions to the puzzles, "a handful of puzzle solutions are so obscure that I had to scour the environment many times before accidentally stumbling into an interactive element".

== See also ==
- A Fisherman's Tale, a VR game based around the same mechanic
