= Death Horizon: Reloaded =

2019 video game

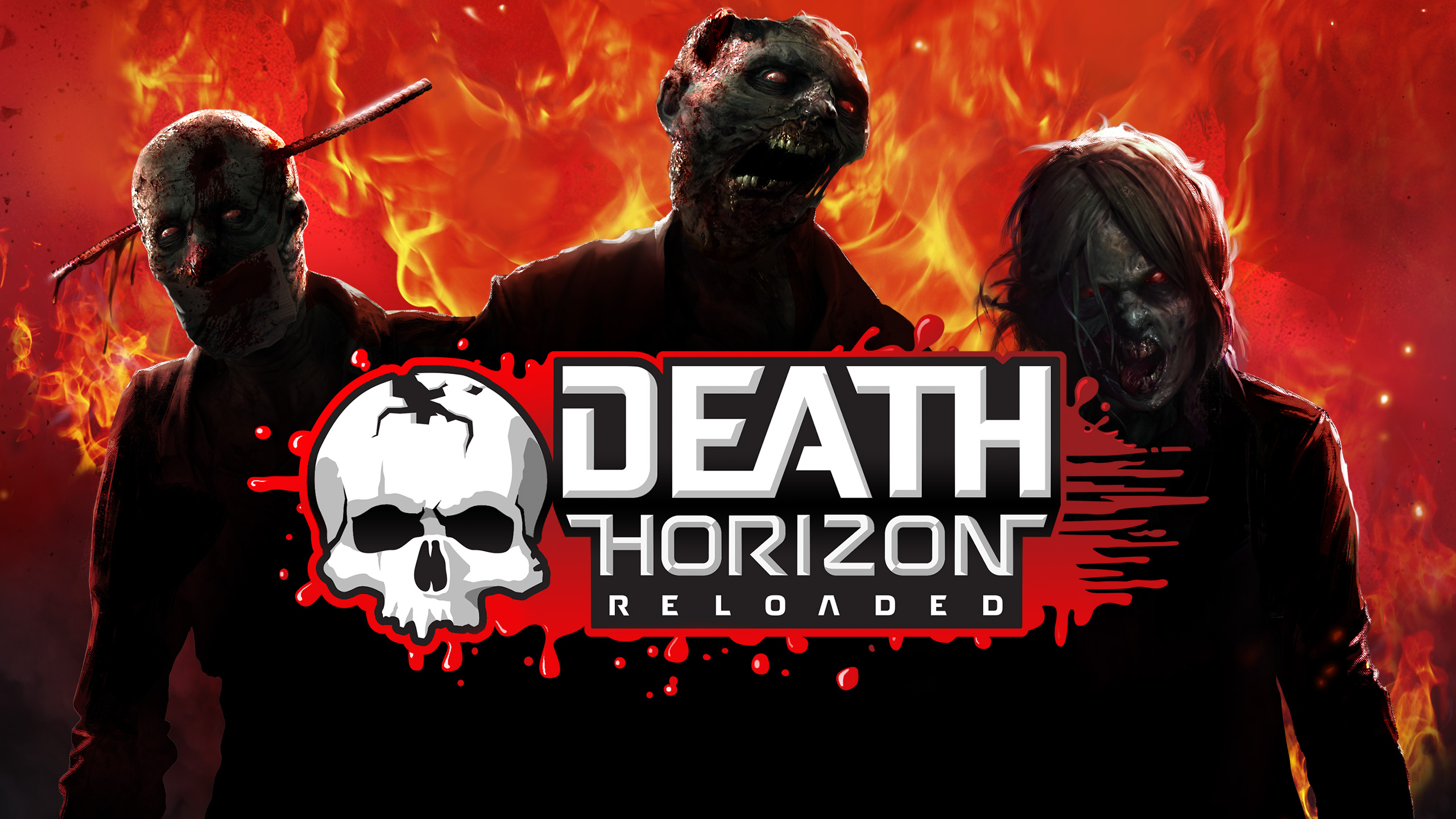
- Developer: Dream Dev Studio VR
- Engine: Unity 3D
- Platforms: Oculus Quest, Oculus Rift, HTC Vive, PlayStation VR
- Release: September 26, 2019
- Genre: First-person shooter
- Modes: single-player, multiplayer

Death Horizon: Reloaded is a first-person shooter for virtual reality devices. The game was released on September 26, 2019. The game is available for Oculus Quest, and there is a version in development for Oculus Rift, HTC Vive, and PlayStation VR. It is a sequel to the game Death Horizon, which came out on September 21, 2017 for the Oculus Go and Samsung Gear VR platforms.

== Gameplay ==
The player can freely move through chapters and choose various methods to complete the game. With the two Oculus Quest controllers, the character interacts with game items and weaponry with two hands, and uses pipes, cables and ladders to move. The two controllers are used when shooting: for example, the player can effectively reload a shotgun with two hands or fire from a pistol while holding onto a cable with the other hand. A multiplayer mode released in 2020 allows two players to play through the campaign together. In 2021 a new Challenges gamemode was added for singleplayer and multiplayer where you can play the game with different features.

== Plot ==
The protagonist finds himself at the abandoned research station Horizon, where he has to face many battles against hordes of zombies. Along the way, the player is helped by an unknown person watching him through the research complex's CCTV system and giving verbal hints. In the later levels, the voice unexpectedly starts trying to slow the player's progress. At the end of the storyline, the game's protagonist meets the mysterious helper and learns their main secret.

== Development ==
Death Horizon: Reloaded's developer is the London-based Dream Dev Studio company. The game was developed specially for VR platforms and is available for the Oculus Quest. There are also versions in development for the Oculus Rift, HTC Vive, PlayStation VR, and Pico NEO 2.

== Reviews ==
Reception

Review scores
Publication	Score
6DOFReviews	7/10
Real o Virtual	6/10
VR Italia	6.3/10
The VR Shop	85/100
NWTV	3/5

The game received average reviews from critics and took 36th place in a list of the top 80 games for Oculus Quest.
