= OhShape =

Virtual reality game

- OhShape box art
- Developer: Odders Lab
- Publisher: Odders Lab
- Engine: Unity
- Platforms: Microsoft Windows, Oculus Quest, PlayStation VR
- Release: December 13, 2019
- Genre: Rhythm
- Mode: Single-player

OhShape is a VR game developed by Odders Lab. This game fuses dance choreography with posing through carved out walls. The developers took inspiration from the TV show Hole in the Wall and mixed it with music. It could be classified as a VR rhythm game in the line of Beat Saber or Synth Riders, but with a different gameplay that requires the movement of the whole body. The game was released as an Early Access on August 15, 2019 and the full release was on December 13, 2019. The game is available for most PCVR headsets such as HTC Vive, Oculus Rift and Valve Index. On February 20, 2020 the game was released on Oculus Quest. The PSVR version of the game was released September 24, 2020.

== Gameplay ==
The player has to move through carved out walls, dodge or break obstacles that come towards him following the beat of the music. Buttons are needed to navigate through the menu and pause/exit the game, but the game itself is played only by moving the each part of the body to the exact position. All the walls are semi-transparent so the player can see through enough to anticipate what is coming next. There are three types of walls:

- Blue walls with different poses: the player has to put their head and their hands in the right spot. Poses range from single arms, to cross arms, to dabbing, lunges, squats, plus other choreography.
- Yellow walls: the player has to avoid their head touch this walls, although the hands can go in.
- Red walls: the player has to break these walls punching in the marked area at the right time.

There are also golden gems placed on the map for the player to grab, they are optional but the increase the final score. OhShape is as much a game of mental prowess as it is physical endurance. According to Eric Switzer, "The player must focus on their head and pick up the details subconsciously through their peripheral vision to keep up. This way the player will be unconsciously processing that information and their body will apply it through muscle memory".

When the player chains up 4 successful moves, the combo meter rises. There are three levels of combo that multiply the score by x2, x3 or x4. If the player misses a wall, the combo meter restarts to 0 and the life bar of the player is damaged. Several consecutive fails lead to game over, but each successful move heals a small portion of the life bar. All this information (score, combo meter and health bar) is displayed in the floor so the player can look at it at any time. At the end of each game, there is a screen that shows some stats such as number of gems collected and walls performance.

The player receives different feedback from their actions. Besides the score counter, combo meter and health bar, each time the player miss a wall, there are red particles flashing and the haptic vibration from the controllers is activated when the player misses a blue wall, revealing which hand isn't well positioned. The haptic feedback is also activated when the player punches a wall, improving the feeling. Another good tool for the player is a shadow projected over the walls, that helps to improve body positioning, specially for newcomers.

Currently the game has one album with 12 different songs with styles that go from euro pop to trap, electro and k-pop. Each song has 3 difficulty levels: easy, medium and hard. Hardest difficulty levels have more walls and the walls move faster through the player. For each difficulty level, there is a world leaderboard and players can compete to outdo each other. The game also has support for custom songs and counts with an open source level editor that can be downloaded from the game's website. With this tool any player can create a map using their own music. The game also includes a tutorial that shows the fundamentals of the gameplay and let the player practice with some basic poses.

== Settings ==
Following the feedback collected along its Early Access stage, the developers of OhShape added some major updates to the game to make it more accessible for different types of players. These are some of the settings added by request of the community:

- No fail mode: the life bar of the player doesn't suffer damage for each miss, so any player can finish any song no matter their skills. Final score is reduced.
- Speed settings: the player can speed up or slow down the song and the walls. A faster speed increases the final score and a lower speed reduces it.
- Precision settings: the player can increase the area of the hitboxes or reduce it. Again, the final score goes up with smaller hitboxes and goes down with wider hitboxes.
- Small room mode: OhShape normal game mode requires a wide space to play (2.5m at least) because there are side steps and arm movements. The Small room mode aligns all the side step walls at the center making it easier for people who doesn't have much room to play, but it also lowers the final score.

== Graphics ==
The action takes place on a platform with abstract, clean and minimalistic aesthetics inspired by other games as Portal or Mirror’s Edge. The theme is upbeat, bright, digital, with transparent gray, white, and yellows. This design choice includes the platform, ducking walls, and gems.

== Release ==
The game was first released as an Early Access title on August 15, 2019 on Steam Store and Oculus Store. A Viveport and Viveport Infinity version arrived months later, on October 24, 2019. On December 13, 2019 OhShape left its Early Access stage and became a full release on all the stores. Along the latest months of 2019, the game was also released in different VR arcade platforms such as Springboard, Synthesis VR and Ctrl V. On February 20, 2020 OhShape was released on Oculus Quest.

Odders Lab has communicated through its social networks the game will arrive to other VR platforms such as PSVR and Pico VR. Although there isn't an official date for these versions, they are planned for the first quarter of 2020. Odders Lab plan to support the game in the future with more content and new features.

== Reception ==
During its Early Access stage the game received positive reviews and feedback to improve the player experience with more settings and new content. The game also got rebranded, as it was firstly known as OnShape, but Odders Lab decided to change the name because there is 3D software also called OnShape. Although the game has not been specifically marketed as a fitness game, players and content creators have labeled the game as a medium-intense cardio exercise. This is what Juanita Leatham said: “My legs were like jello the day after and burning like I had done a hundred squats and side lunges – because I probably did after 30 minutes per play”. As a side note, Eric Switzer did a curious comparison between OhShape and The Enigma of Amigara Fault, a manga written by Junji Ito where “it's discovered that the Amigara Mountain is covered in human shaped holes. This leads to a pilgrimage of sorts as people from all over the world are inexplicably drawn to the mountain to find the hole they fit in; the hole that's made for them”.
