= Time Machine VR =

2016 video game

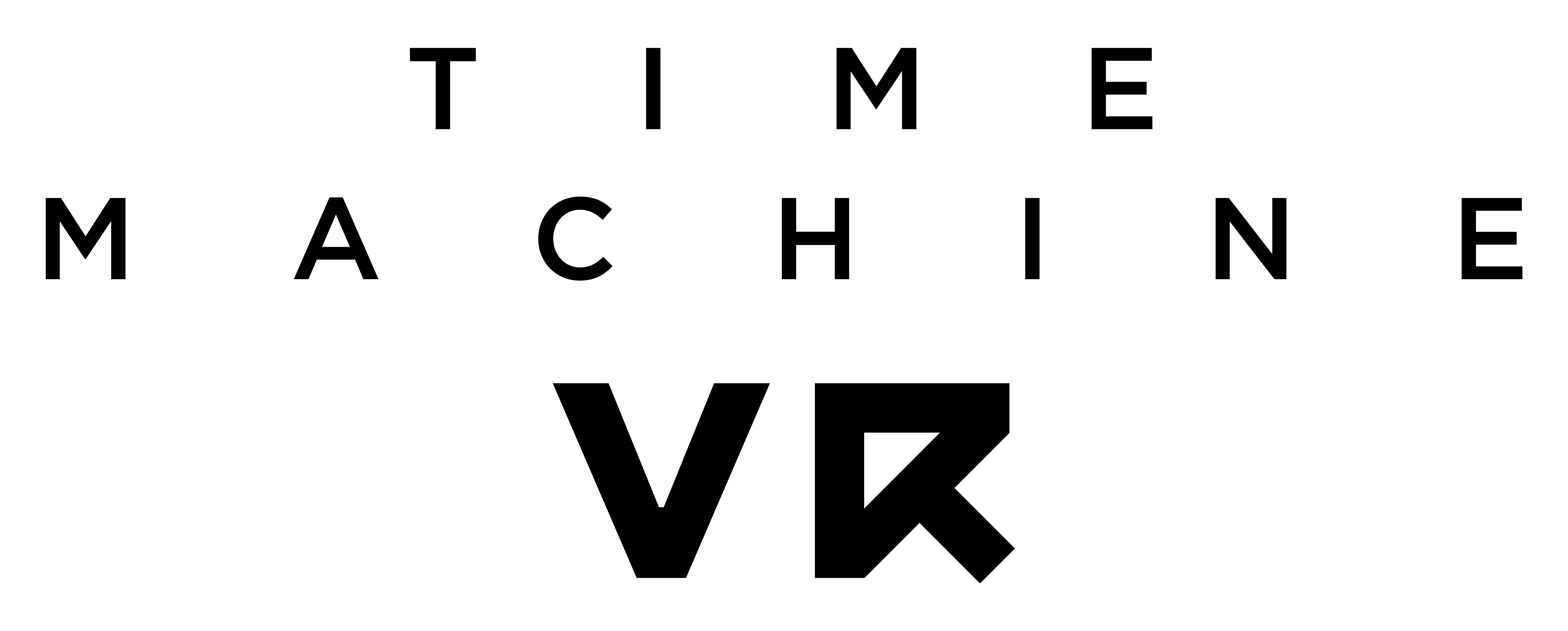
- Developer: Minority Media Inc.
- Publisher: Minority Media Inc.
- Engine: Unreal Engine 4
- Platforms: Microsoft Windows, Oculus Rift, PlayStation 4
- Release: Windows; May 19, 2016; PlayStation 4: NA: November 15, 2016; PAL: November 18, 2016
- Genres: Adventure, simulation
- Mode: Single-player

Time Machine VR is an adventure, indie, simulation video game developed by Minority Media. It was released for Early Access on August 28, 2015, through Steam. and the full game was released through Steam on May 19, 2016. It was released for PlayStation VR on the PlayStation 4 on November 15, 2016, and in Australia and Europe, three days later.

== Gameplay ==
The game is set in 2070 where global warming has released an ancient virus from the Arctic Ice which is killing humanity to the point of extinction. In an effort to save what remains of humanity, the player who is a time travelling cadet, is sent back in time to the Jurassic period. The mission involves observing and scanning objects/creatures to collect data that can be used to combat the virus.

In the story mode, the player starts inside a research hub in Svalbard, Norway where they travel back in time using a time machine. The player travels through the Jurassic oceans encountering many different prehistoric animals including mosasaurs, livyatans and megalodons. Hi-tech probes, scanners and tracking systems are used to extract the data that is needed to combat the virus. It is also possible freeze time and scan creatures using echography and perform behaviour scans. After each mission all the data found is uploaded to the "DinoDex" which unlocks additional data and new creatures.

In exploration mode, previous levels can be revisited to unlock additional scientific data and can uncover clues to aid in humanities survival.

== Development ==
Time Machine VR was developed, over a period of 3 years, by the Canadian games company Minority Media Inc. The developers worked with Dr. Hans Larsson, a research chair in Vertebrate Paleontology for the McGill University, to ensure the game was scientifically accurate.

The game was first made available through Steam early access on 28 August 2015. On 10 October 2015, the first major update was made available. This update included keyboard support, new advanced graphics options and a redesigned mission hub. A second major update was published on 23 December 2015. This update included several new creatures, a new behaviour scan, an upgrade to the Oculus runtime version and performance improvements. The game was made available through Oculus Rift early access on 28 March 2016. On 6 April 2016, the game was made available for the Oculus Rift and HTC Vive through the Steam store. On the 19 May 2016, the full version of the game was released through Steam. Another major update was published on 23 December 2016, this made the virtual reality experience more comfortable after complaints about motion sickness, as well as improving the game controls and general performance.

The arcade version of the game will be a shorter experience and will require the D-Box chair which debuted at the 2017 Game Developers Conference.

== Adaption to Time Machine VR ==
An alternative version of the game called Time Machine VR: Monsters of the Sea was released on Samsung Gear VR on January 16, 2017. Unilike Time Machine VR, it is not free roam because of the performance limitations on mobile devices.

== Reception ==
Time Machine VR had been recognized as one of Steam's top 30 grossing VR titles in their library of over 1,000 games. It was only 1 of 30 games that had that cleared $1 million in revenues, hauling in $1.2 million.

Destructoid gave the game a 7 out of 10, GameRevolution gave the game a 2 out of 5. PlayStation Lifestyle gave the game a 5 out of 10.

== See also ==
Subnautica
