= Sairento VR =

- Developers: Mixed Realms and Swag Soft
- Publisher: Mixed Realms Pte Ltd
- Platforms: Windows (HTC Vive, Oculus Rift); Oculus Quest; PlayStation VR
- Release: December 21, 2016 (Early Access); February 6, 2018 (HTC Vive, Oculus Rift); June 27, 2019 (Oculus Quest)
- Genre: Action
- Mode: Virtual reality games

Sairento VR is a first-person shooter and free combat virtual reality video game developed by Singapore-based Mixed Realms and Swag Soft and released for the HTC Vive and Oculus Rift platforms on February 6, 2018. The game was release for the PlayStation VR on July 5, 2019, and an Oculus Quest version titled Sairento Untethered was released on June 27, 2019.

== Plot ==
Sairento VR takes players on a journey into the darkest possibilities of humanity's high-tech future in the megacity of the Tokyo Cluster, 2066 AD. Players step into the shoes of Chieko Hatsuri, an experienced cyber ninja agent with the clandestine Sairento Organisation. For over ten years, Chieko has helped conduct political espionage and combat operations across the globe to ensure stability and security for Japan. However, in January 2066, a series of terrorist attacks in the Tokyo Cluster push Chieko and her handler Broke past breaking point, ultimately destroying Sairento from within and destabilising the entire developed world. The attacks that take place plunge Chieko and Broke into the fray of an urban warzone, leaving them without support while they try to find the attacks’ perpetrators. They discover that their enemy's strategy includes hacking the in-brain computers of countless Japanese civilians, toying with their senses and forcing them to enact the hackers’ wills. The conspiracy goes deeper: Chieko and Broke find evidence that the Sairento Organisation itself has been compromised by the hackers. Many of the ‘soldiers’ Chieko has been dispatching during gameplay have been either Chieko's colleagues or average civilians, manipulated unwittingly into being soldiers for a mysterious cause. In the game's climax, players will discover that the Sairento Organisation's historic nemesis, the Nenshu Group, gained access to the firmware behind mind-computer interface systems. Nenshu's ultimate plan of anarchic technological revolution has succeeded.

== Gameplay ==
Players take on the identity of a futuristic cyber ninja warrior and are given a range of missions to complete. Each mission offers a unique location filled with enemies the player must eliminate using a variety of skills and weapons closely associated with ninjas. Examples of moves players can make are wall-runs, power slides, triple jumps and a special ability to slow time down. Examples of weapons players can use range from modern weapons like guns to traditional ones like the bow and arrow, kunai, shuriken, katana and glaive. Players can upgrade their skills and weapons by discovering relics while playing the missions and deploying them to a skill tree.

== Reception ==
On Steam, it is one of the highest rated VR games with a 94% overall rating. The game was also covered by YouTubers such as Node, Nathie and JoshDub and also websites like RoadtoVR, UploadVR and Mogura VR. Sairento VR was featured in Pax East 2017 in Boston by the Hardlight VR haptic suit manufacturer as their showcase game and was very popular with the visitors. Sairento VR was also specially covered in Singapore's national newspaper Straits Times on Singapore's National Day.

== Development ==
Sairento VR was jointly developed by Mixed Realms Pte Ltd and its parent company Swag Soft Holdings Pte Ltd, a mobile app development company from Singapore. It was spearheaded by VR and Game Lead Chalit Noonchoo, Creative Director Edrienne Torres, Executive Producers Ngo Chee Yong and Aldric Chang.

== Sources ==
- "Camera, lights, action ... and all made in Singapore". Straitstimes.com. 9 August 2017.
- "ST reviews the best made-in-Singapore games". Straitstimes.com. 13 December 2017.
- "Sairento VR review: Fast-paced ninja action with a shuriken serving of role-play - Pocket-lint". Pocket-lint.com. 29 October 2017.
- "Sairento VR Game Review". Vrbeginnersguide.com. 26 July 2017.
- Arguinbaev, Marat. "Sairento VR Review – Gory Samurai Action With Fun Controls - thevrbase". The VR Base. Archived from the original on 8 January 2018.
