= A Fisherman's Tale =

2019 video game

- Developer: InnerspaceVR
- Publisher: Vertigo Games
- Directors: Balthazar Auxietre, Alexis Moroz
- Engine: Unreal Engine 4
- Platforms: PlayStation 4, Oculus Quest, Microsoft Windows
- Release: Microsoft Windows, PlayStation 4: January 22, 2019; Oculus Quest: November 27, 2019
- Genres: Virtual reality, puzzle game
- Mode: Single-player

A Fisherman's Tale is a 2019 virtual reality game developed by InnerspaceVR and published by Vertigo Games. The game is set in a recursive world where the player controls a puppet fisherman in a model lighthouse. The game was released on Microsoft Windows and PlayStation 4 on January 22, 2019, with a Oculus Quest port being released in 2020. A sequel to the game, originally titled Another Fisherman’s Tale before being changed to A Fisherman's Tale 2, was released May 11, 2023.

== Gameplay ==
The player plays as a puppet who is locked in a recursive lighthouse: The main room of the lighthouse contains a scale model of the lighthouse, with another smaller puppet mirroring the player's actions in it, and the lighthouse itself is contained in a larger copy of the lighthouse main room, also with a larger puppet. As the lighthouses operate as copies of each other, placing an object into the lighthouse model will cause the same object to appear as an oversized version in the lighthouse itself, and the other way around: taking an object - or part of the model - out of the lighthouse model removes that object from the lighthouse itself, and results in a miniature version of it.

The game has four levels, each letting the player explore a different area of the lighthouse. The player can stretch their hands to reach objects out of their reach. The narrator of the game can give hints if the player enables them in the settings.

== Development ==
The game was derived from experimental project Innerspace built in VR using the Unreal Engine 4. A stylized art style was chosen for better performance on VR hardware.

== Reception ==
Reception

Aggregate scores
Aggregator	Score
Metacritic	78/100; 70/100
OpenCritic	65% recommend

Review scores
Publication	Score
PlayStation Official Magazine – UK	8/10
UploadVR	9/10
Road to VR	6/10

A Fisherman's Tale received "generally favorable" reviews according to the review aggregation website Metacritic. Fellow review aggregator OpenCritic assessed that the game received fair approval, being recommended by 65% of critics. UploadVR praised the game's story and themes, saying that, "the tone is often light, the game's themes are anything but". The reviewer criticized the short runtime of A Fisherman's Tale, feeling that it could have been better with an extended runtime. Speaking on the dollhouse mechanic, Road to VR felt the game only scratched the surface on what was possible with its recursive mechanics, commenting that, "I could have easily strapped in for a more serious interaction with what you might call the ‘single player co-op’ mechanic, which lets you do things like pick up a giant anchor blocking a door".

== See also ==
- Maquette (video game), a game based around the same mechanic
