= Death Horizon =

2017 mobile FPS VR game

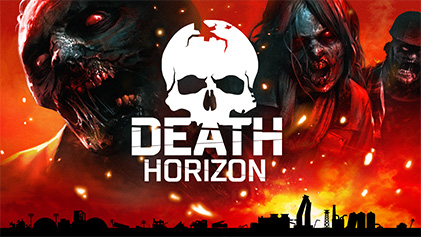
- Developer: Dream Dev Studio VR
- Engine: Unity 3D
- Platforms: Oculus Quest, Oculus Go, Samsung Gear VR, Google Daydream, Mi VR, Pico
- Release: September 21, 2017
- Genre: Shooter game
- Modes: single-player, multiplayer

Death Horizon is a mobile FPS VR game developed by British studio Dream Dev Studio VR.

The Samsung Gear VR version was released September 21, 2017, followed by the release of other versions on Oculus Go, Google Daydream, Xiaomi Mi VR, VR Cinema and Pico. After its release on Gear VR, it stayed at the No.1 spot for paid games for 20 days. On September 28, 2019, an updated and specially reworked version of the game for Oculus Quest devices called Death Horizon: Reloaded was released.

== Plot ==
The Horizon research station is in ruins: the T12 virus breached containment and turned the entire staff into zombies. Players must now destroy every last infected monster lurking the halls to keep the virus from spreading throughout the world.

== Gameplay ==
The game is a combo of classic arcade zombie shooters with a deep immersion and intensity only accessible on VR devices.

Players start as a nameless soldier deployed to the Horizon research center. The first weapon available is an AR15 with unlimited ammo. Later, players find other weapons, including a pump shotgun and heavy machine gun.

The game starts on the 21st underground floor of the research complex. The player's first objective—to rendezvous with Alpha team at the meeting point—turns out to be impossible.

As players rush through halls filled with the walking dead, zombie dogs and toxic zombie mutants, they come to find where Alpha team made their last stand.

Before leaving the complex, the main reactor located far below the labs must be disabled.

== Multiplayer mode ==
The game also features a survival mode against random waves of enemies. Players can team up with a friend, random partner or bot for co-op action. This mode features lots of different weapons and new enemies.

== Development ==
Death Horizon is developed by London-based company Dream Dev Studio VR.

It was designed specially for VR and is available for Gear VR, Oculus Go, Google Daydream and Xiaomi Mi VR.

Development is also underway for Oculus Quest, PlayStation VR, Oculus Rift, HTC Vive and Pico.

The game was used as part of the presentation reel for the release of Mi VR in China.

== Death Horizon: Reloaded ==
On September 28, 2019, an updated and specially reworked version of the game for Oculus Quest devices called Death Horizon: Reloaded was released.

The game's story develops some time after the events of the original part. The story and journey of the protagonist are not revealed at the start of the game this time. A mysterious voice leads the player through the levels, supporting a connection with the hero through the Horizon research station's CCTV system.

Initially, the voice helps the player, but then it begins to create obstacles. In the finale of the story, the player meets the mysterious antagonist and learns the secret of the main character.

The player is free to move through the game and can choose their own ways to complete levels. With the help of the two Oculus Quest controllers, one can interact with items and weapons with two hands, move through various pipes, cables and ladders, and open doors. The principle of the two controllers is used actively in battle. The player can shoot with one hand while grabbing a cable with the other, reload the shotgun with two hands, throw explosive charges and so on. The graphics have also been updated, the game zones reworked and the storyline completion time increased.

A Death Horizon: Reloaded multiplayer version is planned for release in 2020.

== Reception ==
Reception

Review scores
Publication	Score
VRFocus	3/5
The VR Grid	7/10
Christ Centered Gamer	55/100
VR Room	80/100

Renowned game developer John Carmack did an in-depth review of the game on his Facebook page.
