= Smash Drums =

Virtual reality game

Smash Drums is a virtual reality (VR) rhythm game developed and published by PotamWorks SAS. The game was released for the Meta Quest platform on 2 December 2021. The game involves playing drums to the beat of rock songs and destroying various environments. The game has 54 songs and nine environments, and can be played in single-player or multiplayer modes. The game was a finalist for the AIXR 2021 “VR Game of the Year” award

== Gameplay ==
Smash Drums is a VR rhythm game that uses the Meta Quest touch controllers to simulate drumming. The player has to tap the crystal drums and smash the burning drums that appear in front of them according to the rhythm of the song. The game has four difficulty levels and many modifiers that can change the gameplay, such as speed, size, rotation, and gravity. The game also has a scoring system that rewards accuracy, timing, and intensity.

The game has a single-player mode that allows the player to choose from 54 rock songs and nine environments. The environments include a prison, a rock show, a forest, a city, and the moon. Each environment has different objects that can be destroyed by drumming, such as walls, cars, trees, and satellites. The game also has a multiplayer arena that supports up to eight players in co-op or versus modes. The multiplayer mode has a live ranking feature that shows the player’s position on the global or friends leaderboards.

The game also has a progression system that lets the player unlock new tracks, skins, and achievements as they play. The game also offers in-app purchases for additional content.

== Development and release ==
Smash Drums was developed and published by PotamWorks SAS, a French indie studio founded in 2019. The game was created by Julien Potamianos, who was inspired by his passion for rock music and drumming. The game was initially released as a demo on SideQuest in June 2020, where it received positive feedback from users. The game was then officially released for the Meta Quest platform on 2 December 2021. The game also supports the Meta Quest Pro platform and runs at 90Hz on the Meta Quest 2 device.

The game features 54 rock songs from various artists, such as Weezer, Sum 41, Wolfmother, Rise Against and more. The game also features original songs composed by Potamianos himself. The game was updated with 24 new songs for free since its launch.

The game was nominated for the AIXR 2021 “VR Game of the Year” award, which recognizes excellence in VR gaming.

== Reception ==
Smash Drums received positive reviews from players and critics alike. It has a rating of 4.7 out of 5 stars from 1,703 ratings on the Meta Quest store as of June 2023. Users praised the game’s fun and immersive gameplay, its variety of songs and environments, its graphics and sound quality, and its multiplayer mode. Some users also reported some minor bugs and glitches, such as tracking issues, loading errors and crashes.

The game also received favorable reviews from VR media outlets, such as UploadVR, VRFocus.
