= Population: One =

2020 video game

- Developers: BigBox VR, Inc.
- Publishers: BigBox VR, Inc.
- Director: Chia Chin Lee
- Platforms: Meta Quest 3, Oculus Quest 2, Microsoft Windows
- Release: October 22, 2020
- Genre: Battle Royale
- Mode: Multiplayer

Population: One is a 2020 VR Battle Royale developed and published by BigBox VR for the Oculus Quest 2 and Microsoft Windows. Population: One was released on October 22, 2020.

== Gameplay ==
The gameplay is similar to other VR shooters and battle royale games. Players form teams known as "squads" consisting of three (or more, depending on the game mode). Each squad combats with one another until only one remains standing. The basic mechanics are similar to Epic Games's Fortnite, with players able to collect and use weapons and other items used to heal and kill players. In the case of Population: One, the player can climb every object, structure, or geographic feature encountered on the map. The player can also glide across the map from the height to which they climbed. Together, these mechanics form the basis of the game's vertical combat system.

=== Features ===
Players begin each match on a launch ship platform high above the battlefield, and they run to pods at the platform's edge. Upon entering the pod players are launched into the air. Players have the option of riding the pod to a predetermined location on the map, or pulling a handle to drop the pod to the ground.

During battle, a player may revive a fallen teammate using a set of defibrillators. A player may also collect building resources scattered at random throughout the map. These resources are used to build walls and platforms—a defensive wall can protect a player from bullet and grenade damage, and an offensive wall can be built to confuse an enemy as a player advances for an up-close attack.

Supply drops appear at random locations on the map throughout a match. The roar of a supply ship overhead signals an upcoming drop. A player can view the complete map to see where the supplies will land. Drops contain a random assortment of weapons, ammunition, shield sodas, health sodas, bananas, backpack storage, and grenades.

=== Modes ===
Population: ONE's main mode of play is Squads, where players enter the map in groups (or "squads") of three and attack each other. The last squad to stay alive wins the match. The game offers a number of other modes on a rolling basis, with each mode other than Squads (Squads is always available) available to play for a set period of time before being replaced with another one. In Legions, there are six players per squad rather than three. All other gameplay mechanics are the same. In Team Deathmatch, two teams are placed in random locations on the map and each player selects a primary and secondary weapon, along with an accessory such as extra health and shield boosts or grenades. A Deathmatch ends when either one team makes 30 kills or when time runs out. The team with the most kills wins in Deathmatch.

Population: One's Sandbox mode grants players near-full control of the game environment without the restrictions seen within other game modes. Players may freely explore the game environment, construct buildings and items, and experiment more freely with the game's physics and dynamics.

The Sandbox mode offers more customization choices, such as the ability to change the game's time of day and weather. This enables users to construct and explore a broad variety of situations and places, and it promotes exploration and experimentation. Players can create their own custom game maps and change up the physics and gameplay to their liking. This also allows themed game maps to be created like an "Inception city" for example. There are currently over 1000 community-made maps available to play.

== Development ==
The creators of Population: One said that their intention was to build a fully realized, immersive virtual reality world that gives players the freedom to roam about, interact with their surroundings, and participate in a wide range of activities. In order to accomplish this goal, the creators programmed the game using dynamic artificial intelligence and realistic physics, which together provide for a more realistic and exciting gaming experience.

The year 2018 marked the beginning of development for Population: One, while the year 2021 marked the game's formal release. The video game was in production for a number of years before to its launch, during which time it was subjected to a great deal of testing and refinement in order to guarantee that it would live up to the high expectations of quality that had been established by the creators.

In March 2023, the game announced the change of business model into free-to-play, effective on 9 March 2023. Everyone who owned the game beforehand got benefits for paying for the game.

== Reception ==
Population: One received largely positive reviews, including a rating of 81/100 from 4Players and 3.5/5 stars from TheGamer, and was described as the "best VR Battle Royale yet" by Engadget.

=== Awards ===
- 2020 Best Competitive Multiplayer
- 2022 Best VR Game
