= Eleven Table Tennis =

Virtual reality table tennis game

- Developers: Roman Rekhler, Hamzeh Alsalhi, Oscar Vazquez
- Publisher: For Fun Labs
- Platforms: Oculus Quest; PICOXR; Steam VR
- Genre: Virtual reality
- Modes: Single-player, multiplayer

Eleven Table Tennis is a virtual reality (VR) table tennis game developed by For Fun Labs, Inc., and available on Steam, Pico, and Oculus gaming platforms. Eleven Table Tennis was included as exhibition sport for the inaugural Olympic Esports Week, which took place in Singapore from 22 to 25 June 2023.

== Gameplay ==
The game supports multiple languages, and uses a VR handpiece as paddles and a headset as an immersive environment for the game.

=== Game modes ===
Multiple modes are available to play the game.

==== Single player ====
Game matches proceed against a predefined AI difficulty level. The game lasts for 3 sets, with the player who scores the 10th and 11th point consecutively winning the game.

==== Multiplayer ====
This mode allows the player to choose an opponent's level of skill, distance from the player's own location, city, or country, and the replay interval (which defaults to 4 hours). Setting the replay interval to 0 allows those two players to be connected again automatically immediately after the game finishes.

==== Practice mode ====
In practice mode, the player can practice or play multiple mini games. The game's publisher has announced a partnership with STIGA Sports which will add more game modes to the gameplay.

==== Landing page practice mode ====
By selecting "auto-serve for the AI" and setting a fixed location and fixed size of the table area, the ball will be returned by the AI almost 95% to that area and within the fixed size. This mode has no scoring.

==== Machine throwing balls ====
The second practice mode is machine-based. By setting altitude, speed, and curve on the machine, players can coordinate a custom practice mode which will keep serving balls in the selected manner. This mode has no scoring.

==== Minigames ====
There are other mini games built-in, including beer pong, quadrants, and wall tennis.

== Reception ==
Reception

Review scores
Publication	Score
Rapid Reviews UK	4.5/5
World of Geek Stuff	4/5
Meta	4.5/5
Facebook	4.7/5
VR Fitness Insider (for its fitness potential)	7/10
Real or Virtual	7.5/10

GamesRadar+ describes this game as a "super realistic table tennis simulator". Ian Hamilton, writing for UploadVR, described the game as life like and engaging game as it was reviewed during the COVID-19 lockdown time. The game is included in the list of best 41 VR games currently available in the market by CNET. There is a review by professional players who played it and then reviewed it. The game is described by them as real to the extent that their gameplay was improved by playing table tennis in the VR. This game was reviewed from fitness perspective as well. The reviewer gave a score of 7/10 after testing its fitness potential.

=== Competitive professionals ===
- Enzo Angles: A premier French professional player and the Season 1 MVP of Major League Table Tennis (MLTT). Angles is a top-100 ITTF-ranked physical player who maintains an elite VR Elo. He frequently produces content demonstrating that professional-grade footwork and strokes translate 1:1 into the virtual environment.
- Sean O'Neill: A two-time U.S. Olympian and 5-time U.S. National Champion. O’Neill serves as a technical bridge between the traditional sport and the VR community, assisting developers in refining paddle physics to ensure professional standards.

=== Notable endorsements ===
- Dimitrij Ovtcharov (Germany): The former World No. 1 and multi-time Olympic medalist has publicly tested the game, demonstrating how high-level professional strokes translate to VR.
