= Arizona Sunshine 2 =

2023 video game

- Developer: Vertigo Games
- Publisher: Vertigo Games
- Director: Peter Deurloo
- Writer: Rob Yescombe
- Platforms: Meta Quest; SteamVR; PlayStation VR2; Pico 4
- Release: December 7, 2023
- Genre: First-person shooter
- Modes: Single-player, multiplayer

Arizona Sunshine 2 (Note: Stylized as Arizona Sunshine II) is a 2023 first-person shooter video game developed and published by Vertigo Games. A sequel to Arizona Sunshine (2016), the game was released for virtual reality devices such as Meta Quest headsets, PlayStation VR2, SteamVR and Pico 4 in December 2023.

== Gameplay ==
Like its predecessor, Arizona Sunshine 2 is a first-person shooter set in a desert located in Arizona, in which the player must survive a zombie apocalypse. The player character has access to a large variety of firearms such as shotguns and flamethrowers, and melee weapons such as crowbars, pickaxes, and machetes. Melee combat was significantly updated for the game with a "new mutilation and gore system". Throughout the game, the player is accompanied by a companion dog named Buddy, who will assist the player in combat as well as fetching items from faraway for the player.

The single-player campaign offers four different difficulty options. It can also be played cooperatively with another player. The game also features a horde mode, which enables four players to combat endless waves of enemies. Players can also view an online leaderboard to compare their performances with other players around the globe. Additional maps for the horde mode will be released following the game's release.

== Reception ==
Arizona Sunshine 2 received "mixed or average" reviews according to review aggregator website Metacritic.

Dan Stepleton from IGN wrote that "Arizona Sunshine 2 keeps the pressure on for a long campaign of zombie slaying full of satisfyingly gory head shots, entertaining humor, and the bond between a lonely man and his dog". He liked the variation in gameplay design, though he felt the game lacked enemy variety. Mark Delaney from GameSpot praised the inclusion of Buddy in the game for adding more complexity to gameplay, as well as the game's improved melee combat and setpieces. However, he disliked the game's story for being predictable and the main protagonist for being "an unfunny dweeb".

Arizona Sunshine 2 was on the Top 10 list of most PSVR2 downloaded games, ranking on 3rd place in US and 4th place in Europe.
