= Ships That Fight Underground =

Planned video game

- Developer: Little Orbit
- Publisher: Little Orbit
- Engine: Unreal Engine 4
- Platforms: Linux; macOS; PlayStation 4; Switch; Windows; Xbox One
- Genre: First-person shooter
- Modes: Single-player, multiplayer

Ships That Fight Underground is an upcoming first-person shooter game developed and published by Little Orbit.

The game was originally developed by Descendent Studios and was successfully funded via the crowdfunding website Kickstarter in 2015. The game was branded as Descent: Underground (later just Descent) under license from and intended as a prequel to the 1995 video game Descent. The game was temporarily released on Steam as an early access title the same year. Descendent Studios signed a deal with publisher Little Orbit for financial support. The game was expected to be available in 2019 on Microsoft Windows, Nintendo Switch, PlayStation 4 and Xbox One, but a lengthy contract dispute between the developer and publisher delayed release during which time the licensing deal with Interplay Entertainment for use of the Descent name lapsed. In March 2022, it was announced that the parties had reached a settlement agreement in which Little Orbit acquired all rights and assets to the game, which was renamed back to its pre-Kickstarter working title.

== Premise ==
Ships That Fight Underground is set in 2136. In the game, Earth's natural resources have been depleted, threatening the stability of human society and civilization. Space explorers were sent across the galaxy to find a new home planet for humanity to evacuate to. None of them has returned, and the people then turn to harvesting asteroids as their only hope of survival, leading to starfighter skirmishes over possession of the most profitable and life-sustaining ones.

== Gameplay ==
Ships That Fight Underground is a first-person shooter game in which the player flies a spaceship through mines and caverns on asteroids. The ship is free to move and rotate in any direction and is not bound by gravity. The game includes four multiplayer modes, some in which players fight one another or work together in single-player missions. According to Ars Technica, the game has many features similar to the original Descent, including tunnels leading to large rooms, power-ups and energy stations at which to recharge one's energy level for ammunition.

== Development ==
The game originally began as a spiritual successor to the Descent series. As early as 1998, Volition announced intentions to develop Descent 4, which would have been a prequel preceding the events of the original Descent. However, because of the disappointing sales of Descent 3 and the company's lack of interest in continuing the series, it was halted in favor of initial work on Summoner. It morphed into a new project called Red Faction as Volition continued where it left off.

New plans to develop a Descent installment were set forth in November 2014 when several former developers for the game Star Citizen, led by Eric "Wingman" Peterson, announced the formation of Descendent Studios with the goal of working on a Descent-like game called Ships That Fight Underground. The company struck a deal with Interplay Entertainment, who approached it the next month and granted it a license to the Descent trademark. In March 2015, Descendent Studios unveiled a Kickstarter campaign for Descent: Underground, a new prequel using Interplay's existing trademark rights to the Descent franchise. The studio began production after the Kickstarter campaign successfully funded in April, raising US$601,773 against the $600,000 goal, with continued funding on its website.

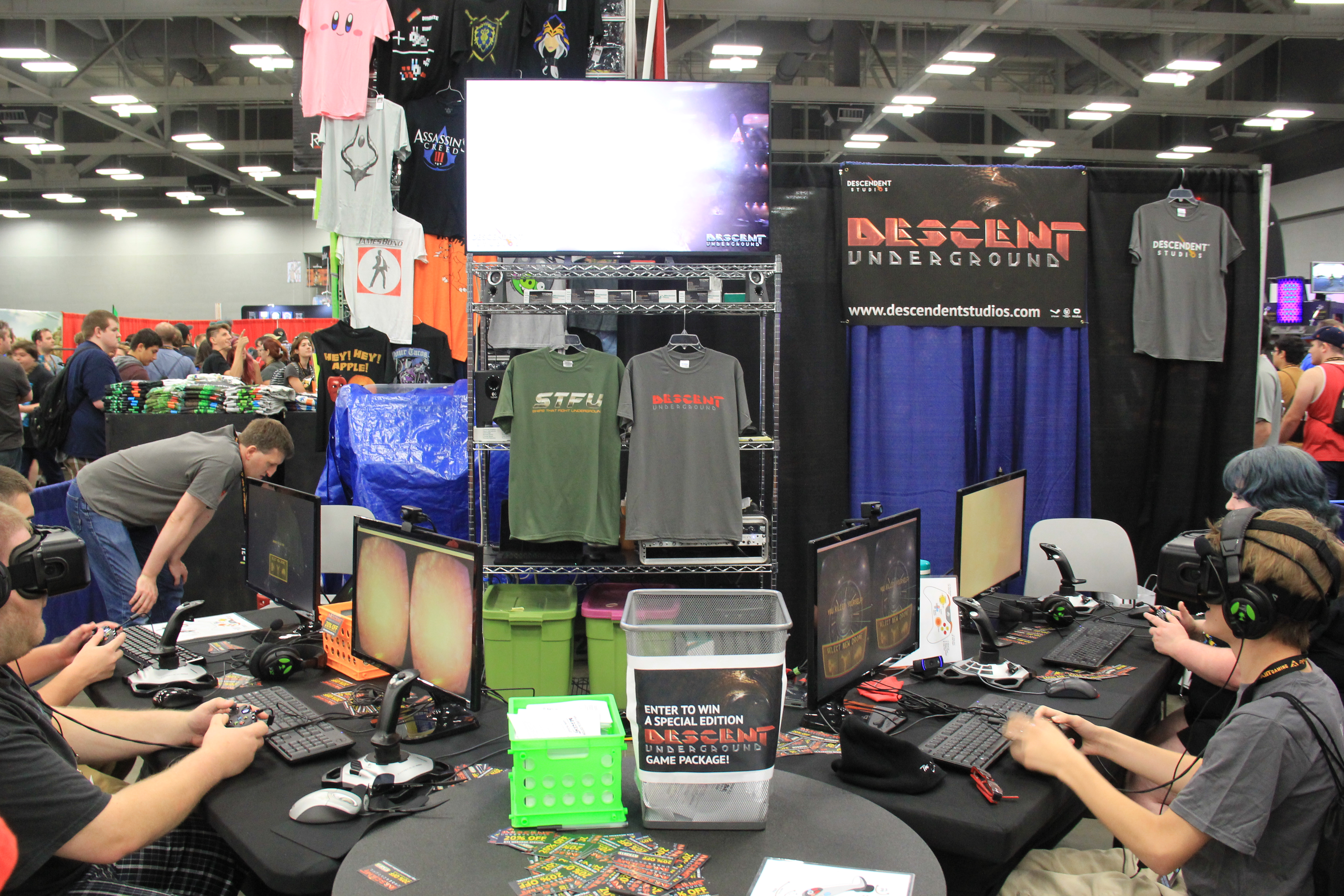
Descent: Underground demonstration and merchandise at RTX 2015

Descendent Studios first showcased Descent as an early demo at RTX 2015, allowing for use of virtual reality headsets. According to the developers, the game was well-received and played by hundreds of people. Descendent Studios relied on testing the game, which is powered by Unreal Engine 4, with its crowdfunders rather than its own staff to assure the game's quality, and it aimed to produce a "Triple-I" game, or a video game of AAA standards with an indie budget. On October 22, Descendent Studios released an early access, multiplayer-only version of the game on Steam, with a single-player campaign being in development and due after the early access phase.

Descendent Studios pulled the game from Steam in September 2017 to speed up its development, as well as add a single-player mode. Later in 2017, the company partnered with Little Orbit, who agreed to publish the game, being responsible for its funding, marketing and distribution. At the time, Little Orbit announced planned versions for PlayStation 4, Xbox One, Windows, macOS and Linux. The game was also announced for the Nintendo Switch in October 2018, when the publisher began taking pre-orders, offering more content as a bonus to those who pre-ordered it then or had crowdfunded it or purchased it while the game was in early access on Steam. It was also available for pre-ordering on GOG.com, being sold with a free copy of Descent 3 for a limited time.

Descent was slated for launch in early 2019, requiring only a final open beta test to aid in final polish and balancing prior to release. Unfortunately, problems arose in May of that year with Eric Peterson claiming that Little Orbit had breached their contract with Descendent Studios and alleging that the publisher lacked the financial resources to finalize development and market the game properly with many developers at Descendent having had to take on other jobs to pay their bills. Per their contract with Little Orbit, Descendent Studios was not allowed to self-publish and Interplay, owners of the Descent trademark, stepped in to attempt to broker a deal between the publisher and the developers.

=== Legal Battle ===
After a protracted period of negotiations, Little Orbit initiated legal action against Descendent Studios on January 16, 2020, accusing the studio of breach of contract, negligent representation, fraud, and trade libel seeking damages to be determined at trial from the studio as well as declaratory relief giving Little Orbit ownership of all intellectual property related to the project. On February 24, Little Orbit posted a message through their GamersFirst website stating that development on the game had been halted by the studio, that Kickstarter funds could not be refunded to backers, and that preorders made with Little Orbit were being refunded. In response to their claims, Descendent Studios filed a countersuit on February 28 alleging that Little Orbit had materially breached the development agreement by failing to market the game as agreed, changing the scope of the project without providing additional time or funding to achieve these new requirements, failing to develop and furnish Descendent with the API Little Orbit wished them to integrate their game with, failing to pay third party vendors, requiring the studio to change engines mid-project, demanding extensive redesigns of the user interface on at least four separate occasions, adding new platforms which required extensive modifications to existing work to support, and failing to furnish the studio with financial records relating to expenses paid toward the project by the publisher, as well as statements relating to pre-sales of the game. Descendent's countersuit claimed that development had been halted as a result of Little Orbit's failure to pay monies required by an addendum to the development agreement which the parties agreed to in November 2018 beyond the first required payment. On November 17, 2020, the two parties met before a magistrate for a settlement conference which lasted more than six hours resulting in a settlement agreement and the case being dismissed without prejudice.

Unfortunately, this settlement agreement did not mark the end of the game's legal woes as less than a month later the parties submitted a request for the court to retain jurisdiction pending completion of the settlement. This motion was granted and then repeated three more times for an additional 90 days' extension before discussions broke down again. On April 16, 2021, Descendent Studios filed a motion to enforce the settlement agreed upon in November. The primary issues in dispute at this time related to whether or not the settlement agreement was binding and the definition of the term "revenues" with Little Orbit claiming that, in the context of the settlement, the term referred to net sales or profit whereas Descendent contends that the standard definition applies. On June 21, 2021, the court ruled the settlement binding with an effective date of May 24.

Days later, unhappy with the ruling, Little Orbit filed a motion to set aside the settlement alleging that Descendent had failed to uphold their end of the settlement agreement resulting in a second motion for enforcement of the settlement by Descendent Studios. On July 27, Little Orbit's motion was denied and Descendent's granted, resulting in the publisher filing an appeal on August 5, 2021. From this appeal ensued a flurry of motions and opposing filings, culminating in a hearing on December 16, 2021 at which a final settlement was negotiated between the parties.

=== Settlement ===
On March 10, 2022, the two parties announced a settlement in which Little Orbit purchased all rights, IP and assets of the game from Descendent Studios and assumed sole responsibility for the development and publishing of the title. The game was renamed back to its original working title, Ships That Fight Underground, which had been used prior to the deal with Interplay that granted Descendent rights to use the Descent IP.
