= Laser Limbo =

2025 mixed reality video game

- Developer: freeroam.ar
- Platform: Meta Quest
- Release: 12 December 2025
- Genre: Mixed reality
- Modes: Single-player, multiplayer

Laser Limbo is a mixed reality video game developed by the Berlin-based studio freeroam.ar. Originally developed for location-based entertainment, Laser Limbo entered open beta on Meta Quest App Lab in April 2024. It remained in early access until its full release in December 2025.

== Development and release ==
Laser Limbo was developed by freeroam.ar. Nico Uthe and Christoph Springer, who had previously co-founded the German VR company VR-Nerds, worked on the game. Uthe had also worked on Tower Tag and Lucid Trips.

In 2023, Medienboard Berlin-Brandenburg provided €50,000 in development and production funding for the project.

The game was first developed for location-based entertainment, with a version intended for larger groups and managed through a separate operator application. An open beta for Quest 2, Quest 3 and Quest Pro was released through Meta Quest App Lab in April 2024. A full release had initially been planned for later that year.

Support for StrikerVR's Mavrik haptic controller was later added. UploadVR tested the controller with Laser Limbo in 2025. The publication noted that walls and other features of the play area had to be mapped manually, and that the setup worked better in a larger space than in the smaller room used for the test.

The game remained in early access until 12 December 2025, when the full version was released for Quest 2 and later Meta Quest headsets. The release added more cooperative and competitive modes, including laser sword combat and games without shooting.

The Unterhaltungssoftware Selbstkontrolle rated the Meta Quest version for ages 12 and above in October 2025.

== Gameplay ==
Laser Limbo uses headset passthrough so that players can see their surroundings while playing. Walls, furniture and other physical features can form part of the play area. Multiple players using separate headsets can play in the same physical space. Before a game begins, the play area is mapped, and virtual walls, spawn points and other elements can be placed using the map editor.

The game has single player, cooperative and competitive multiplayer modes. Players face computer controlled opponents or compete against other players. Some modes use projectiles and laser barriers that players avoid by moving around the play area.

Later versions added more competitive and cooperative modes, as well as laser-sword combat and modes without shooting. The home version supports two players in the same physical space. A separate version for location-based venues uses an operator application and supports up to eight players.

== Reception ==
In 2024, MIXED noted that local multiplayer mixed-reality games were still uncommon on Meta Quest and mentioned Laser Limbo alongside other games that used a shared physical play area.

Road to VR compared parts of the game with Spatial Ops and Laser Dance. It also noted that the map editor allowed players to set up the game for different spaces.

In 2025, heise online included Laser Limbo in a comparison of mixed reality laser-tag games. The publication noted its different game modes and movable laser barriers, but found that setting up the play area required more manual work than some of the other games it tested.

== Accolades ==
Laser Limbo won the Interactive Entertainment category at the 2024 nextReality.Contest.

== See also ==
- Mixed reality
- Location-based entertainment
- Meta Quest
