= Time Stall =

- Developer: Force Field Entertainment
- Publisher: Oculus Studios
- Directors: Martin de Ronde, Jay Malloy
- Engine: Unreal Engine
- Platform: Oculus Quest
- Release: August 15, 2019
- Genres: (Action) Puzzle, Space/ Universe
- Mode: Single Player

Time Stall is a VR single player physics based (action) puzzle game for the Oculus Quest, developed by Netherlands-based Force Field Entertainment and released August 15, 2019.

== Synopsis ==
=== Story ===
The player is a human woken from cryogenic sleep aboard a crowd funded prototype ‘time-folding’ spaceship (Fantastic Leap) destined for a better life on a new planet (Terra Prime). You meet the Captain and Victoria the ship's computer in a time of great need. The combination of the robot crew malfunctioning and the ship's cheap construction are causing mini catastrophes. These problems are causing it to drift off course and into perilous danger of colliding with a star.

The player must journey through a series of catastrophes situated in different parts of the ship to reach the end goal of the ship's bridge. The ship's computer Victoria is able to detect catastrophic events and slow time for a short duration enabling you to save the Captain and progress throughout the ship. Save the remnants of mankind by getting the Captain safely to the bridge and avert the ship's destruction.

=== Characters ===
- The Captain
- Dave - Navigator
- Randy - Co-pilot
- Greg - Maintenance
- Steve - Engineering
- Jeff - Chef
- Larry - Drink Service
- Tom - Roomservice
- Red - Windows

=== Scenarios ===
- Cryogenics/Welcome Hall (Tutorial)
- Plasma Pipe
- Diner
- Navigation Tower
- Passenger Cabin
- Cargo Bay
- Warp Core
- Bridge

== Reception ==
Netherlands based YouTuber and VR Game reviewer Nathie did a walktrough of the first three scenario's while wearing a space suit.

Jamie Feltham of the site upload VR "Time Stall's physics are a delight to tinker with" and "it's definitely refreshing to see a game that gives you so much creative freedom in how you go about beating it". But also "Sadly, fascinating interactions such as these are rarely necessary. Most of Time Stall's incoming threats are dismissed using a well-placed gas canister or popping the cork on a champagne bottle to send it flying". Time Stall got a 6/10. Some bad points are the level design rarely have a need for invention, the main campaign is short and most solutions to the puzzles are similar. The good points are the strong physics that give creative fun and the creation of an excellent world.

6DOF reviews gave Time Stall an 8.5. with a 9 for Concept, Gameplay and Graphics.Audio got an 8 and longevity 7.5. Summarizing it as " If you don't mind the fact that it's a bit brief, Time Stall is a fantastic puzzler with a unique twist that truly makes you feel like a superhero."

French based ET.fr. gave Time Stall a 13 and reviewed Time Stall as "a fun game that will bring a dose of fun to who likes the genre. Rather diversified with several ways to address certain problems, the title offers as a bonus French subtitles. The main issue is, as usual, a rather short game duration".

Time Stall received 4,5 stars out of 5 stars according to the review aggregation on the Oculus store website.
