= Audioshield =

2016 video game

- Developer: Dylan Fitterer
- Publisher: Dylan Fitterer
- Engine: Unity
- Platforms: HTC Vive, Windows
- Release: April 5, 2016
- Genre: Music
- Mode: Single-player

Audioshield is a 2016 music video game created by Dylan Fitterer for the HTC Vive. The game generates levels based on music supplied by the player. In the game, the player blocks incoming notes with a shield of a matching color. Audioshield received mixed responses for its gameplay.

== Gameplay ==
The player uses the HTC Vive's handheld motion sensing controls to operate two shields, colored blue and orange. The player uses these shields to block incoming orbs of the corresponding color. Sometimes the player must block purple orbs by holding both of the shields together.

The level generation is done in a similar way to Fitterer's previous Audiosurf series. The user supplies the song, and the game generates a series of orbs to match the beat of the song. Songs can be stored locally, and they could run through YouTube streaming before YouTube blocked this feature as it violated its license policy.

== Reception ==
Reception

Aggregate score
Aggregator	Score
Metacritic	81/100

Review score
Publication	Score
Game Informer	80/100

On Metacritic, Audioshield received a "generally favorable" score of 81 based on five critics. Some praised Audioshield for its innovative approach to the music game genre, while others opined that the game lacked replayability, even with a large variety of songs.
