= Synth Riders =

2019 virtual reality rhythm game

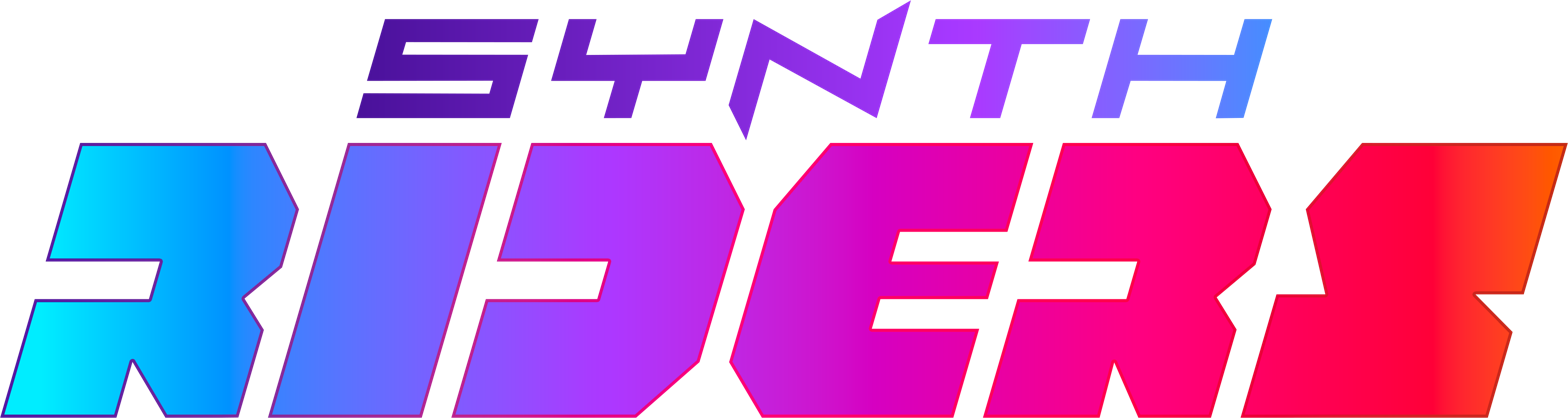
- Developer: Kluge Interactive
- Publisher: Kluge Interactive
- Engine: Unity
- Platforms: HTC Vive, Oculus Rift, Oculus Quest, Meta Quest 2, Meta Quest 3, Meta Quest Pro, Pico Neo 3, Pico 4, PlayStation 4, PlayStation 5, PlayStation VR, PlayStation VR2, Valve Index, visionOS, Windows, Google Play
- Release: May 21, 2019
- Genre: Rhythm
- Modes: Single-player, multiplayer

Synth Riders is a virtual reality rhythm game developed and published by Kluge Interactive. It involves players touching spheres ('notes'), tracing lines ('rails'), and avoiding obstacles that move towards them.

Following an early access release in July 2018, the game was officially released for Steam VR and Meta Quest on May 21, 2019, and supports most virtual reality headsets including Oculus Rift, Oculus Quest, Quest 2, Quest 3 and Quest Pro, PlayStation VR, PlayStation VR2, HTC Vive, Pico 4, Valve Index, Samsung Galaxy XR and Apple Vision Pro.

== Gameplay ==
The game is designed for virtual reality headsets and requires at least one motion controller on all platforms except for Apple Vision Pro, which utilizes hand tracking. Players have access to a selection of music tracks, each of which can be played at different difficulty levels. Additionally, players can choose from a range of virtual environments known as 'Stages', which can be paired with any song. Alternatively, they may opt for one of the 'Experiences'- visual animations inspired by and synchronized with specific songs. Upon selecting a song, notes and rails appear and move towards the player who must match the correct colored hand to the object. Aside of the regular objects there are also special sections attracting bonus points. These are either gold objects, which must be played with both hands, or green objects, where the player must use the hand first used to complete all objects in that section. Additionally, players need to navigate around obstacles that occasionally appear in the game, which can be accomplished through ducking or dodging to the sides.

== Development ==
Synth Riders's development started in 2016, when Kluge Interactive began experimenting with VR technology. It was conceived by creative director Abraham Aguero, who collaborated with another developer, Jhean Ceballos, in designing and building the game. The concept took shape through a series of prototypes, and it made its debut on July 12, 2018 as an early access title on Steam. After the release, Aguero listened to community feedback as the game underwent successive updates. Reflecting on the initial years, he mentioned, "The first two years were pretty much me watching people play on Twitch for hours. I'd jump into their stream, hearing their feedback, asking them questions."

The game left Steam early access and was released for Steam VR and Meta Quest on May 21, 2019. In the following years, the game was expanded through the addition of new gameplay modes. Major updates included cross-platform multiplayer, Spin Mode, Spiral Mode, and Mixed Reality Mode. Aguero claims that part of the team's strategy involves porting Synth Riders "everywhere we can".

Mixed reality features for visionOS became available through Apple Arcade with the release of the Apple Vision Pro headset on February 2, 2024.

== Song packs ==
=== Base game ===
Pack	OST songs (free)	DLC songs (paid)	Release date
Synthwave Essentials Vol 1	19		July 12, 2018
FiXT Essentials Vol 1	12		June 20, 2019
Ninety9Lives	13		November 1, 2019
Electro Swing Essentials	7	5	April 23, 2020
Monstercat (was Cyberpunk Essentials) Music Pack	6	5	August 13, 2020
Synthwave Essentials Vol 2 (Muse)	5	5	January 14, 2021
Adrenaline Essentials (The Offspring)	3	5	March 25, 2021
Synthwave Essentials Vol 3 (The Midnight)	5	5	July 13, 2023
Electro Swing Essentials Vol 2 (Jamie Berry)	4	5	January 25, 2024
Specials Music Pack	7	2	October 30, 2024
Total OST (included in Base Game)	81	EASY: 78; NORMAL: 80; HARD: 78; EXPERT: 79; MASTER: 74; CUSTOM: 1	

=== Paid DLC ===
Pack	DLC songs (paid)	Release date	Included Experience or Stage
Electro Swing Essentials	5	April 23, 2020	"Rise of the Golden Phoenix" Stage
Monstercat (was Cyberpunk Essentials) Music Pack	5	August 13, 2020	"Dystopia" Stage
Synthwave Essentials Vol 2 (Muse)	5	January 14, 2021	"Algorithm" Experience™
Adrenaline Essentials (The Offspring)	5	March 25, 2021	"Come Out and Play" Experience™
Caravan Palace Music Pack	5	July 9, 2021	"Wonderland" Experience™
Muse Music Pack	5	September 16, 2021	"Starlight" Experience™
Lindsey Stirling Music Pack	5	April 14, 2022	"Underground" Experience™
League of Legends Music Pack (K/DA)	5	September 1, 2022	"Legends Never Die" Experience™
Groovin' Essentials (Bruno Mars)	5	December 15, 2022	"Liquid Disco" Stage
Gorillaz Music Pack	7	February 22, 2023	"Psycho Road" Stage
Synthwave Essentials Vol 3 (The Midnight)	5	July 13, 2023	"Back to the Synths Remastered" Stage
Electro Swing Essentials Vol 2 (Jamie Berry)	5	January 25, 2024	
80s Mixtape - Side A	5	April 18, 2024	"Endless Café" Stage
Specials Music Pack	2	October 30, 2024	
Synth Riders Experience™ - Barbie™ Dance ‘n Dream	1	December 5, 2024	Barbie™ Dance ‘n Dream Experience™
80s Mixtape - Side B	7	January 9, 2025	
Kendrick Lamar HUMBLE. Experience™	1	February 2, 2025	HUMBLE. Experience™
Current Waves Music Pack	5	March 6, 2025	
90s Rock Music Pack	5	May 15, 2025	
Infected Mushroom Music Pack	3	August 17, 2025	
Lady Gaga Music Pack	11	December 18, 2025	
Dua Lipa Music Pack	7	April 16, 2026	
Crypt of the NecroDancer Music Pack	5	May 14, 2026	
Linkin Park Music Pack	13	June 25, 2026	
Total DLC	127	EASY / NORMAL / HARD / EXPERT: 127 each; MASTER: 124; CUSTOM: 1; EXPERIENCES™: 8	

== Reception ==
Synth Riders received "generally favorable" reviews according to Metacritic.

The game was featured by Forbes in their list of The Top 50 VR Games of 2019. In 2020, The Guardian acknowledged the fitness aspect of the game, placing it among the top 10 VR fitness apps, calling it "Joyful, even if you look ridiculous to onlookers." Push Square appreciated the ability to personalize gameplay according to one's preferences. As they noted, "The game is also a very malleable one, with an almost overwhelming number of modifiers and settings to play around with."

=== Awards ===
Year	Award	Category	Result	Ref.
2020	XR Awards 2020	VR Game of the Year	Finalist	
2020	VR Fitness Insider’s 2020 VR Fitness Awards	Best VR Fitness Game of the Year	Finalist	
2020	VR Fitness Insider’s 2020 VR Fitness Awards	Best VR Rhythm Game of the Year	Finalist	
2022	UploadVR's Best of VR 2022	Best Updated VR Game	Nominated	
2024	Apple Design Awards	Spatial Computing	Finalist	
