= Arizona Sunshine =

2016 video game

- Developers: Vertigo Games; Jaywalkers Interactive
- Publisher: Vertigo Games
- Composer: Jonathan van den Wijngaarden
- Engine: Unity
- Platforms: Windows; PlayStation 4 Oculus Rift; Oculus Quest; Windows Mixed Reality; HTC Vive; Valve Index; PlayStation 5 (remake); Meta Quest 2 (remake); Meta Quest 3 (remake); Steam VR (remake)
- Release: December 6, 2016; October 17, 2024 (remake)
- Genre: First-person shooter
- Modes: Single-player, Multiplayer

Arizona Sunshine is a zombie survival first-person shooter video game developed and published by Vertigo Games and released on December 6, 2016. The game is compatible with the HTC Vive, Oculus Rift, Oculus Quest, Valve Index and PlayStation VR virtual reality headsets.

A sequel, Arizona Sunshine 2, was released in 2023. Then, in 2024, features built for the sequel were integrated into the original game. The updated version of the original game and all DLCs were re-released as Arizona Sunshine Remake. The remake was released on modern platforms, including PlayStation VR2, Meta Quest 2, Meta Quest 3 and Steam VR.

A flat-screen remake of the game, which allows players to play the game in third-person, is set to be released on January 21, 2027 for Windows, Nintendo Switch 2, PlayStation 5, and Xbox Series X and Series S.

== Gameplay ==
Arizona Sunshine requires motion controllers for play. The controllers are used to manipulate virtual firearms as well as to interact with the player's inventory and the environment. The player can carry a firearm in each hand, as well as two more in holstered positions, one on either side of the hips. The game supports room scale tracking. In the original version of the game traveling long distances required teleporting by pointing the controller and pressing the appropriate button but a January 2017 update to the game made artificial locomotion (free-roaming) available as an option.

The game includes a campaign in which the player explores environments and finds the tools needed to advance, and a horde mode in which players are confined to a small camp and try to survive against increasingly difficult waves of zombie attacks. The zombies themselves spawn according to the player's chosen difficulty level. On higher levels, zombies can spawn in larger numbers, and tougher zombies with "armor" (e.g. motorcycle helmets, army uniforms, etc.) spawn more frequently. Both the campaign and the horde mode can be played in single-player and multiplayer modes.

During the campaign the player constantly encounters small groups of zombies which are relatively easy to dispatch. But certain player actions, like picking up certain objects needed to advance the story, trigger a large zombie horde from which the player has to defend themselves by using their weapons and surroundings.

== Plot ==
The unnamed player character (voiced by Sky Soleil), awakes in a cave in an Arizona river valley. While exploring his surroundings and killing zombies he encounters, he finds a radio, turns it on and hears, among much static, something which sounds like a human voice. Searching for the source of the signal, the player encounters another radio with a stronger signal and comes to the conclusion that it is sent from a refinery which has been reinforced by the military. But when he reaches the refinery, he sees that it has been overrun by zombies. The player kills them all in a fit of rage and then has a breakdown. After staying the night in a safe room in the refinery, he continues the next morning, aimless and desperate. But after finding another radio, he notices that the signal is still there and is being sent from a town called Sunshine, Arizona. The player continues to the town and finally reaches the radio station, only to find out that no one in the station is alive and the signal is sent automatically. But when he screams his frustrations into the radio station microphone, someone answers him and tells him to wait outside, where he is rescued by a helicopter after withstanding a massive horde of zombies.

== Reception ==
Reception

Aggregate score
Aggregator	Score
Metacritic	PC: 81/100; PS4: 63/100

Review scores
Publication	Score
Destructoid	6/10
Hardcore Gamer	3.5/5
Push Square	5/10
UploadVR	8.5/10

Arizona Sunshine received positive reviews for the PC version of the game, while the PlayStation 4 version received mixed reviews. On Metacritic, the game holds scores of 81/100 for the PC version (based on 5 reviews) and 63/100 for the PlayStation 4 version (based on 31 reviews).

=== Remake ===
Reception

Aggregate score
Aggregator	Score
Metacritic	Quest: 80/100; PS5: 78/100

Review score
Publication	Score
Push Square	7/10

Arizona Sunshine Remake received generally favorable reviews on both PC, Quest and PlayStation 5. On Metacritic, the game holds scores of 78/100 for the PS5 version (based on 12 reviews) and 80/100 for the Quest version (based on 5 reviews).

== Core i7 exclusivity scandal ==
Shortly after the game's release, players discovered that certain unadvertised features in Arizona Sunshine were only available on systems with an Intel Core i7 CPU, due to a deal formed between Vertigo Games and Intel. PC Gamer referred to the hardware lockout as "unprecedented" in a video game. After fans expressed concerns, developer Vertigo Games announced that the restricted modes would become available to all players in March 2017. The lockout drew a large negative backlash from the player community, and Vertigo Games unlocked the features to all players a day after the lockout was discovered.
