= List of video games released in 2016 =

The following is a comprehensive index of all games released in 2016, sorted chronologically by release date, and divided by quarter. Information regarding developer, publisher, operating system, genre, and type of release is provided where available

For a summary of 2016 in video games as a whole, see 2016 in video games.

== Legend ==
Video game platforms
3DS	Nintendo 3DS, 3DS Virtual Console, iQue 3DS	DROID	Android	iOS	iOS, iPhone, iPod, iPadOS, iPad, visionOS, Apple Vision Pro
LIN	Linux, SteamOS	OSX	macOS	PS3	PlayStation 3
PS4	PlayStation 4	PSV	PlayStation Vita	PSVR	Playstation VR, PlayStation VR2
Quest	Meta Quest / Oculus Quest family, including Oculus Rift	Vive	HTC Vive	Wii	Wii, WiiWare, Wii Virtual Console
WiiU	Wii U, WiiU Virtual Console	WIN	Windows, all versions Windows 95 and up	XB360	Xbox 360, Xbox 360 Live Arcade
XBO	Xbox One				

Types of releases
Compilation	A compilation, anthology or collection of several titles, usually (but not always) belonging to the same series
Early access	A game launched in early access is unfinished and thus might contain bugs and glitches or have some of the content missing
Episodic	An episodic video game that is released in batches over a period of time
Expansion	A large-scale DLC to an already existing game that adds new story, areas and additions and/or changes to the game's mechanics
Full release	A full release of a game that launched in early access first
Limited	A special release (often called "Limited" or "Collector's Edition") with bonus collector's material. Often provided to people who pre-order a game
Port	The game first appeared on a different platform and a port was made. The game is like the original, with few or no differences
Remake	The game is an enhanced remake of an original, made using a new engine and/or assets and thus containing completely new sound, graphics and possibly changes to the story and/or gameplay
Remaster	The game is a remaster of an original, released on the same or different platform, with (usually minor) changes to graphics, sound and/or gameplay
Rerelease	The game was re-released on the same platform with no or only minor changes

Video game genres
Action	Action game	Action RPG	Action role-playing game	Action-adventure	Action-adventure game
Adventure	Adventure game	Brawler	Beat 'em up	CMS	Construction and management simulation
Dungeon crawl	Dungeon crawl	Endless runner	Endless runner	Fighting	Fighting game
FPS	First-person shooter	Graphic adventure	Graphic adventure	Hack and slash	Hack and slash
Horror	Horror game	Interactive film	Interactive film	Metroidvania	Metroidvania
MMO	Massively multiplayer online game	MOBA	Multiplayer online battle arena	Music	Music video game
Party	Party video game	PCA	Point-and-click adventure	Platformer	Platformer
Puzzle	Puzzle video game	Puzzle-platformer	Puzzle-platformer	Racing	Racing video game
Rhythm	Rhythm game	Roguelike	Roguelike, Roguelite	RPG	Role-playing video game
RTS	Real-time strategy	RTT	Real-time tactics	Run and gun	Run and gun game
Sandbox	Sandbox game	Scrolling shooter	Scrolling shooter	Shoot 'em up	Shoot 'em up
Shooter	Shooter game	Simulation	Simulation video game	Sports	Sports video game
Stealth	Stealth game	Strategy	Strategy video game	Survival	Survival game
Survival horror	Survival horror	Tactical RPG	Tactical role-playing game	TBS	Turn-based strategy
TBT	Turn-based tactics	Tower defense	Tower defense	TPS	Third-person shooter
Vehicle sim	Vehicle simulation game	Vehicular combat	Vehicular combat game	Visual novel	Visual novel

== List ==
=== January–March ===
Release date	Title	Platform	Type	Genre	Developer	Publisher	Ref.
January 4	Pony Island	WIN, OSX, LIN		Action-adventure			
January 5	Amplitude	PS4		Music			
January 5	Hardware: Rivals	PS4		Vehicular combat			
January 5	Volume	PSV		Stealth			
January 8	Lovely Planet	XBO		FPS, Platformer			
January 8	Punch Club	WIN		Sports management			
January 12	Assassin's Creed Chronicles: India	WIN, PS4, XBO		Action-adventure, Stealth			
January 12	The Banner Saga	PS4, XBO		Tactical RPG			
January 12	Gemini: Heroes Reborn	XBO					
January 12	Gone Home: Console Edition	PS4, XBO		Walking sim			
January 12	Tharsis	WIN, PS4		Strategy			
January 12	That Dragon, Cancer	WIN, OSX, DROID		Adventure, Art			
January 14	Bleach: Brave Souls	iOS, DROID		Brawler			
January 15	Dragon's Dogma: Dark Arisen	WIN		Action RPG, Hack and slash			
January 15	Echoes of Aetheria	WIN					
January 15	Infra	WIN		Adventure			
January 15	Oxenfree	WIN, OSX, XBO		Graphic adventure			
January 19	Attractio	WIN, PS4, OSX, LIN		FPS, Puzzle			
January 19	Blade & Soul	WIN		Action, MMO, RPG			
January 19	A Boy and His Blob	WIN, PS4, PSV, XBO		Puzzle-platformer			
January 19	Darkest Dungeon	WIN, OSX		RPG, Dungeon crawl			
January 19	The Deadly Tower of Monsters	WIN, PS4		Action-adventure			
January 19	Gemini: Heroes Reborn	WIN, PS4					
January 19	Oddworld: New 'n' Tasty!	PSV		Cinematic platformer			
January 19	Resident Evil Zero HD Remaster	WIN, PS3, PS4, XB360, XBO	Remaster	Survival horror			
January 19	World of Tanks	PS4		Vehicular combat, MMO			
January 20	Homeworld: Deserts of Kharak	WIN		RTS			
January 21	FNaF World	WIN		RPG			
January 21	Minecraft: Story Mode: Episode 1 — The Order of the Stone	WiiU		Graphic adventure, Interactive film			
January 21	The Westport Independent	WIN		Simulation			
January 21	Yakuza Kiwami (JP)	PS3, PS4		Action-adventure			
January 22	Death by Game Show	WIN, OSX, LIN					
January 22	Mario & Luigi: Paper Jam	3DS		RPG			
January 26	Final Fantasy Explorers	3DS		Action RPG			
January 26	Lego Marvel's Avengers	WIN, XB360, XBO, PS3, PS4, PSV, WiiU, 3DS		Action-adventure			
January 26	The Witness	WIN, PS4		Puzzle			
January 28	Dragon Quest Builders (JP)	PS3, PS4, PSV		Action RPG, Sandbox			
January 28	IMSCARED	WIN					
January 28	Rise of the Tomb Raider	WIN	Port	Action-adventure			
January 29	AIPD – Artificial Intelligence Police Department	WIN, PS4, XBO					
January 29	Bombshell	WIN		Shoot 'em up			
January 29	Sébastien Loeb Rally Evo	WIN, PS4, XBO		Racing			
January 29	This War of Mine: The Little Ones	PS4, XBO		Survival			
February 2	American Truck Simulator	WIN, OSX, LIN		Vehicle sim			
February 2	Cobalt	WIN, XB360, XBO		Action			
February 2	Digimon Story: Cyber Sleuth	PS4, PSV		RPG			
February 2	Dreii	WIN, iOS, DROID					
February 2	Gravity Rush Remastered	PS4		Action-adventure			
February 2	Megadimension Neptunia VII	PS4		RPG			
February 2	Not a Hero	PS4		Shooter			
February 2	Sorcery!	WIN, OSX		Graphic adventure			
February 2	Tales of Symphonia HD	WIN		RPG			
February 3	Fortified	WIN, XBO					
February 3	Great Detective Pikachu (JP)	3DS		Adventure			
February 4	Adventures of Mana	iOS, DROID		Action RPG			
February 4	Agatha Christie: The ABC Murders	WIN, PS4, XBO		Adventure			
February 5	XCOM 2	WIN, OSX, LIN		TBT, Tactical RPG			
February 9	Arslan: The Warriors of Legend	WIN, PS3, PS4, XBO		Hack and slash			
February 9	Assassin's Creed Chronicles Trilogy Pack	WIN, PS4, XBO		Action-adventure, Stealth			
February 9	Assassin's Creed Chronicles: Russia	WIN, PS4, XBO		Action-adventure, Stealth			
February 9	Dying Light: The Following	WIN, PS4, XBO		Action RPG, Survival horror			
February 9	Final Fantasy IX	iOS, DROID		RPG			
February 9	Firewatch	WIN, OSX, LIN, PS4		Adventure			
February 9	Lovers in a Dangerous Spacetime	PS4		Action, Platformer			
February 9	Naruto Shippuden: Ultimate Ninja Storm 4	WIN, PS4, XBO		Fighting, Action			
February 9	Tomb of the Mask	iOS		Puzzle			
February 9	Unravel	WIN, PS4, XBO		Puzzle-platformer			
February 10	Shin Megami Tensei IV: Apocalypse (JP)	3DS		RPG			
February 10	Valkyria Chronicles Remaster (JP)	PS4		Tactical RPG			
February 11	Grand Theft Auto: Liberty City Stories Mobile	DROID		Action-adventure			
February 11	Oddworld: New 'n' Tasty!	WiiU		Cinematic platformer			
February 11	Prism	iOS		Puzzle			
February 16	Elite Dangerous: Arena	WIN		Vehicular combat (spaceship)			
February 16	The Escapists: The Walking Dead	PS4		Strategy, RPG			
February 16	Layers of Fear	WIN, PS4, XBO		Horror (psych)			
February 16	Pillars of Eternity: The White March — Part 2	WIN		RPG			
February 16	Project X Zone 2	3DS		Tactical RPG			
February 16	Street Fighter V	WIN, PS4		Fighting			
February 16	Tron RUN/r	WIN, PS4		Endless runner			
February 17	Californium	WIN, OSX		Adventure			
February 17	Rocket League	XBO		Sports			
February 18	Danganronpa: Trigger Happy Havoc	WIN		Adventure, Visual novel			
February 18	I Am Setsuna (JP)	PS4, PSV		RPG			
February 18	No Pineapple Left Behind	WIN, LIN, OSX		Simulation	Subaltern Games		
February 18	Plague Inc: Evolved	WIN, OSX, LIN		RTS, Simulation			
February 18	Rayman	iOS		Platformer			
February 18	Thumb Drift	iOS		Action			
February 19	Fire Emblem Fates	3DS		Tactical RPG			
February 23	Far Cry Primal	PS4, XBO		FPS			
February 23	Hitman Go: Definitive Edition	WIN, PS4, PSV		Puzzle			
February 23	Ninja Senki DX	WIN, PS4, PSV		Action, Platformer			
February 23	One Upon Light	WIN, OSX					
February 23	Plants vs. Zombies: Garden Warfare 2	WIN, PS4, XBO		Tower defense, TPS			
February 23	The Walking Dead: Michonne: Episode 1 — In Too Deep	WIN, PS3, PS4, XB360, XBO		Graphic adventure, Interactive film			
February 24	Bit.Trip Presents... Runner2: Future Legend of Rhythm Alien	PS4		Platformer			
February 24	Disgaea PC	WIN		Tactical RPG			
February 24	The Flame in the Flood	WIN, OSX, XBO		Roguelike, Survival, Adventure			
February 25	Assassin's Creed Identity	iOS		Action RPG			
February 25	Grim Dawn	WIN		Action RPG, Hack and slash			
February 25	Superhot	WIN, OSX, LIN		FPS			
February 25	Life in Bunker	WIN, LIN, OSX		Survival	Flox Studios		
February 26	Stardew Valley	WIN		Simulation, RPG			
February 26	The Town of Light	WIN, OSX, LIN		Horror (psych), Adventure			
February 26	We Are the Dwarves	WIN, OSX, LIN					
February 28	Slashy Souls	iOS, DROID		Action RPG			
February 29	Soul Axiom	WIN, OSX		Puzzle, Adventure			
March 1	Alekhine's Gun	WIN, PS4, XBO		Action, Stealth			
March 1	Broforce	PS4		Run and gun			
March 1	Deponia Doomsday	WIN, PS4, XBO		PCA			
March 1	Far Cry Primal	WIN		FPS			
March 1	Gears of War: Ultimate Edition	WIN		TPS			
March 1	Heavy Rain	PS4		Interactive drama, Action-adventure			
March 1	Tron RUN/r	XBO		Endless runner			
March 1	The Witch and the Hundred Knight: Revival Edition	PS4		Action RPG			
March 1	Xblaze Code: Embryo	WIN		Visual novel			
March 2	BlazBlue: Chrono Phantasma Extend	WIN		Fighting			
March 3	Black Desert Online	WIN		MMO, RPG			
March 4	Action Henk	PS4, XBO					
March 4	Into the Stars	WIN		Vehicular combat (spaceship)			
March 4	The Legend of Zelda: Twilight Princess HD	WiiU		Action-adventure			
March 4	Momodora: Reverie Under the Moonlight	WIN		Metroidvania			
March 8	Kholat	PS4		Survival horror			
March 8	Mind Zero	WIN		RPG, Dungeon crawl			
March 8	Shardlight	WIN		Adventure			
March 8	Tom Clancy's The Division	WIN, PS4, XBO		Action RPG, TPS			
March 9	Teslagrad	XBO		Puzzle-platformer			
March 10	Deathsmiles	WIN		Shoot 'em up			
March 10	The Guest	WIN					
March 10	Moon Hunters	WIN		Action RPG			
March 11	Hitman: Intro Pack	WIN, PS4, XBO		Stealth			
March 11	WWE 2K16	WIN		Sports			
March 15	EA Sports UFC 2	PS4, XBO		Sports			
March 15	Need for Speed	WIN		Racing			
March 15	Salt and Sanctuary	PS4		Action RPG, Metroidvania			
March 15	Sheltered	WIN, PS4, XBO		Survival			
March 16	Dungeon of the Endless	XOne		Roguelike, Tower defense			
March 16	Shadow Complex Remastered	XBO		Platformer, Adventure			
March 16	Shantae and the Pirate's Curse	XBO		Platformer, Metroidvania			
March 17	Pharaoh Rebirth+	WIN		Metroidvania			
March 18	Mario & Sonic at the Rio 2016 Olympic Games	3DS		Sports, Party			
March 18	Pokkén Tournament	WiiU		Fighting			
March 21	Hyperdimension Neptunia U: Action Unleashed	WIN		Action RPG, Hack and slash			
March 21	XCOM: Enemy Unknown	PSV		TBT, Tactical RPG			
March 22	Catlateral Damage	PS4		Simulation			
March 22	Day of the Tentacle Remastered	WIN, OSX, LIN, PS4, PSV		PCA			
March 22	République	WIN, OSX, PS4, iOS, DROID		Action-adventure, Stealth			
March 22	Stranger of Sword City	XBO		RPG, Dungeon crawl			
March 22	Trackmania Turbo	WIN, PS4, XBO		Racing			
March 23	Way of the Samurai 3	WIN		Action-adventure, Action RPG			
March 24	Atari Vault	WIN					
March 24	Dead or Alive Xtreme 3 (JP)	PS4, PSV		Sports			
March 24	LostWinds	WIN		Platformer, Metroidvania			
March 24	LostWinds 2: Winter of the Melodias	WIN		Platformer, Metroidvania			
March 24	Samorost 3	WIN, OSX		Puzzle, Adventure			
March 24	Slain!	WIN		Action, Platformer			
March 25	Hyrule Warriors Legends	3DS		Hack and slash			
March 28	Adrift	Quest		Adventure			
March 28	Adventure Time: Magic Man's Head Games	Quest					
March 28	Blazerush	Quest		Racing, Vehicular combat			
March 28	Chronos	Quest		RPG			
March 28	Dead Secret	Quest		Survival horror			
March 28	Eve Gunjack	Quest		Shoot 'em up			
March 28	Eve: Valkyrie	Quest		Vehicular combat, FPS			
March 28	Fly to Kuma	Quest					
March 28	Keep Talking and Nobody Explodes	Quest		Puzzle			
March 28	Lucky's Tale	Quest		Platformer			
March 28	Radial-G	Quest		Racing			
March 28	Smashing the Battle	Quest					
March 28	Windlands	Quest					
March 29	Killer Instinct: Season 3	WIN, XBO		Fighting			
March 29	Minecraft: Story Mode Episode 5 — Order Up!	WIN, PS3, PS4, XB360, XBO, iOS, DROID		Graphic adventure			
March 29	MLB The Show 16	PS3, PS4		Sports			
March 29	NightCry	WIN		Graphic adventure, Survival horror			
March 29	Nights of Azure	PS4		Action RPG			
March 29	No Time to Explain	PS4		Action, Platformer			
March 29	Resident Evil 6	PS4, XBO		Action-adventure, TPS			
March 29	Trillion: God of Destruction	PSV		RPG			
March 29	Unepic	PS4, PSV		Platformer, RPG, Metroidvania			
March 29	The Walking Dead: Michonne: Episode 2 — Give No Shelter	WIN, PS3, PS4, XB360, XBO		Graphic adventure, Interactive film			
March 30	Epistory – Typing Chronicles	WIN, OSX, LIN		Action-adventure, Typing			
March 31	Ashes of the Singularity	WIN		RTS			
March 31	Hyper Light Drifter	WIN, OSX		Action RPG, Adventure			
March 31	Sleeping Dogs: Definitive Edition	OSX		Action-adventure			
March 31	Star Ocean: Integrity and Faithlessness (JP)	PS4		Action RPG			

=== April–June ===
Release date	Title	Platform	Type	Genre	Developer	Publisher	Ref.
April 1	Adam's Venture: Origins	WIN, PS4, XBO		Adventure			
April 1	Stikbold! A Dodgeball Adventure	WIN					
April 5	1979 Revolution: Black Friday	WIN, OSX		Adventure, Interactive film			
April 5	Assassin's Creed Chronicles Trilogy Pack	PSV		Action-adventure, Stealth			
April 5	Dead Star	WIN, PS4					
April 5	Dirt Rally	PS4, XBO		Racing (sim)			
April 5	Enter the Gungeon	WIN, OSX, LIN, PS4		Bullet hell, Roguelike			
April 5	The Gallery: Episode 1 — Call of the Starseed	Vive		Puzzle, Adventure			
April 5	Hover Junkers	Vive					
April 5	Job Simulator	Vive		Simulation			
April 5	Quantum Break	WIN, XBO	Original	Action-adventure, TPS			
April 5	Skullgirls 2nd Encore	PSV		Fighting			
April 5	Sorcery! Part 3: The Seven Serpents	WIN, OSX		Graphic adventure			
April 5	Stikbold! A Dodgeball Adventure	PS4					
April 8	Stikbold! A Dodgeball Adventure	XBO					
April 12	Dark Souls III	WIN, PS4, XBO		Action RPG			
April 12	Ratchet & Clank	PS4		Platformer			
April 12	Stories: The Path of Destinies	WIN, PS4		Action RPG			
April 13	Warbits	iOS		TBT			
April 14	Code of Princess	WIN		Action RPG, Brawler, Hack and slash			
April 14	Everybody's Gone to the Rapture	WIN		Adventure, Art			
April 14	Final Fantasy IX	WIN		RPG			
April 14	Phantasmal	WIN					
April 15	Bravely Second: End Layer	3DS		RPG			
April 18	Battlezone 98 Redux	WIN		FPS, RTS			
April 18	Danganronpa 2: Goodbye Despair	WIN		Adventure, Visual novel			
April 18	Stephen's Sausage Roll	WIN, OSX, LIN		Puzzle			
April 19	Axiom Verge	PSV		Metroidvania			
April 19	The Banner Saga 2	WIN, OSX		Tactical RPG			
April 19	Invisible, Inc.	PS4		TBT, Stealth			
April 19	KOI	PS4					
April 19	Loud on Planet X	WIN, PS4		Music, Platformer			
April 19	Melty Blood: Actress Again Current Code	WIN		Fighting, Visual novel			
April 19	SpeedRunners	WIN		Platformer			
April 20	Masquerade: The Baubles of Doom	WIN, PS4, PS3, XBO, XB360					
April 20	Pollen	WIN		Walking sim			
April 21	Battlefleet Gothic: Armada	WIN		RTT			
April 21	Loud on Planet X	iOS, DROID		Music, Platformer			
April 21	Rogue Stormers	WIN		Action			
April 22	Crown and Council	WIN		TBS			
April 22	Rugby Challenge 3	PS4, PS3, XBO, XB360		Sports			
April 22	Star Fox Guard	WiiU		Tower defense			
April 22	Star Fox Zero	WiiU		Scrolling shooter			
April 26	Alienation	PS4		Shoot 'em up, RPG			
April 26	Hitman: Sapienza	WIN, PS4, XBO		Stealth			
April 26	Hyperdevotion Noire: Goddess Black Heart	WIN		Tactical RPG			
April 26	King's Quest: Chapter 3 — Once Upon a Climb	WIN, PS4, PS3, XBO, XB360		Adventure			
April 26	Rocketbirds 2: Evolution	PS4, PSV		Action			
April 26	Sega 3D Classics Collection	3DS					
April 26	Severed	PSV		Action-adventure			
April 26	Stranger of Sword City	PSV		RPG, Dungeon crawl			
April 26	The Walking Dead: Michonne: Episode 3 — What We Deserve	WIN, PS3, PS4, XB360, XBO, iOS, DROID		Graphic adventure, Interactive film			
April 28	Angry Birds Action!	DROID, iOS		Pinball			
April 28	Lost Reavers	WiiU		Action RPG			
April 28	Mini Mario & Friends: Amiibo Challenge	3DS, WiiU		Puzzle			
April 28	Offworld Trading Company	WIN, OSX		RTS			
April 29	DC Universe Online	XBO		MMO, Action			
May 3	Battleborn	WIN, PS4, XBO		FPS			
May 3	The Park	PS4, XBO		Horror (psych)			
May 3	Ray Gigant	PSV		RPG			
May 3	Shadow Complex Remastered	WIN, PS4		Adventure, Platformer			
May 3	Superhot	XBO		FPS			
May 5	Kathy Rain	WIN, OSX		PCA			
May 5	Uncharted: Fortune Hunter	iOS, DROID					
May 9	Stellaris	WIN, OSX, LIN		RTS			
May 10	TASTEE: Lethal Tactics	WIN		TBT			
May 10	Uncharted 4: A Thief's End	PS4	Original	Action-adventure, TPS, Platformer			
May 11	Raiden V	XBO		Scrolling shooter (vertical)			
May 12	Final Fantasy X/X-2 HD Remaster	WIN		RPG			
May 12	Goliath	WIN, OSX					
May 12	Super Meat Boy	WiiU		Platformer			
May 13	Disney Art Academy	3DS		Educational			
May 13	Doom	WIN, PS4, XBO	Original	FPS			
May 16	Smashing the Battle	WIN					
May 17	Homefront: The Revolution	WIN, PS4, XBO		FPS			
May 17	Salt and Sanctuary	WIN		Action RPG, Metroidvania			
May 17	Shadow of the Beast	PS4		Platformer, Action-adventure, Hack and slash			
May 17	Shadwen	WIN, PS4		Stealth			
May 17	Soft Body	WIN, PS4					
May 17	Valkyria Chronicles Remastered	PS4		Tactical RPG			
May 18	Duskers	WIN		Strategy			
May 18	htoL#NiQ: The Firefly Diary	WIN		Puzzle, Adventure			
May 19	Lastfight	WIN					
May 19	Sengoku Jidai: Shadow of the Shogun	WIN					
May 19	Time Machine VR	Vive, Quest		Adventure, Simulation			
May 20	Girl's Frontline	iOS, DROID		Tactical RPG			
May 24	Not a Hero	XBO		Shooter			
May 24	OlliOlli2: Welcome to Olliwood	XBO		Sports			
May 24	Overwatch	WIN, PS4, XBO	Original	FPS	Blizzard Entertainment		
May 24	Teenage Mutant Ninja Turtles: Mutants in Manhattan	WIN, PS4, PS3, XBO, XB360		Action, Hack and slash			
May 24	Total War: Warhammer	WIN		TBS, RTT			
May 26	OmniBus	WIN		Action, Platformer			
May 26	Table Top Racing: World Tour	WIN		Racing			
May 31	Dead Island: Definitive Edition	WIN, PS4, XBO		Action RPG, Survival horror			
May 31	Hitman: Marrakesh	WIN, PS4, XBO		Stealth			
May 31	One Piece: Burning Blood	PS4, PSV, XBO		Fighting			
May 31	Smite	PS4		MOBA			
June 1	Pool Nation VR	Vive					
June 1	Senran Kagura Shinovi Versus	WIN		Action, Brawler			
June 1	TurnOn	WIN, OSX, XBO		Platformer			
June 2	Brigador	WIN, OSX, LIN		RTT			
June 3	Assetto Corsa	PS4, XBO		Racing (sim)			
June 3	Dangerous Golf	WIN, PS4, XBO		Sports			
June 3	Hard Reset Redux	WIN, PS4, XBO		FPS			
June 6	Edge of Nowhere	Quest		Action-adventure			
June 6	Hearts of Iron IV	WIN, OSX, LIN		Grand strategy			
June 7	Atelier Sophie: The Alchemist of the Mysterious Book	PSV, PS4		RPG			
June 7	Guilty Gear Xrd -Revelator-	PS3, PS4		Fighting			
June 7	Mirror's Edge Catalyst	WIN, PS4, XBO		Action-adventure, Platformer			
June 7	Odin Sphere Leifthrasir	PS3, PS4, PSV		Action RPG			
June 7	The Solus Project	WIN, XBO		Survival			
June 7	SteamWorld Heist	WIN, OSX, LIN, PS4, PSV		TBS, Action-adventure			
June 10	Kirby: Planet Robobot	3DS		Action, Platformer			
June 10	Sherlock Holmes: The Devil's Daughter	WIN		Adventure			
June 13	Trials of the Blood Dragon	WIN, PS4, XBO		Platformer			
June 14	Dead by Daylight	WIN		Survival horror			
June 17	Dreamfall Chapters: Book 5 — Redux	WIN, OSX, LIN		Adventure			
June 17	Prism	DROID		Puzzle			
June 21	Asemblance	WIN, PS4					
June 21	Deadlight: Director's Cut	WIN, PS4, XBO		Cinematic platformer, Survival horror			
June 21	Drawful 2	WIN, OSX, PS4, XBO		Party	Jackbox Games	Jackbox Games	
June 21	Mighty No. 9	WIN, OSX, LIN, PS3, PS4, XB360, XBO, WiiU		Action, Platformer			
June 21	Pac-Man 256	WIN, PS4, XBO		Endless runner			
June 21	Umbrella Corps	WIN, PS4		Tactical shooter			
June 21	VA-11 HALL-A	WIN, OSX, LIN		Simulation, Visual novel			
June 23	Perchang	iOS		Puzzle, Strategy			
June 24	Mario & Sonic at the Rio 2016 Olympic Games	WiiU		Sports, Party			
June 24	Tokyo Mirage Sessions ♯FE	WiiU		RPG			
June 28	7 Days to Die	PS4, XBO		Survival horror			
June 28	God Eater: Resurrection	PS4, PSV		Action RPG			
June 28	Grand Kingdom	PS4, PSV		Tactical RPG			
June 28	JoJo's Bizarre Adventure: Eyes of Heaven	PS4		Fighting			
June 28	Lego Star Wars: The Force Awakens	WIN, XB360, XBO, PS3, PS4, PSV, WiiU, 3DS		Action-adventure			
June 28	Prison Architect	PS4, XBO		CMS			
June 28	Resident Evil 5	PS4, XBO		TPS			
June 28	Star Ocean: Integrity and Faithlessness	PS4		Action RPG			
June 28	The Technomancer	WIN, PS4, XBO		Action RPG			
June 28	Terraria	WiiU		Action-adventure, Sandbox			
June 28	Zero Time Dilemma	PSV, 3DS		Adventure			
June 29	Inside	XBO		Puzzle-platformer, Adventure			
June 29	Lost Sea	XBO					
June 30	BoxBoxBoy!	3DS		Puzzle-platformer			
June 30	Crypt of the Necrodancer Pocket Edition	iOS		Roguelike, Rhythm			
June 30	Super Robot Wars Original Generation: The Moon Dwellers (JP)	PS3, PS4		Tactical RPG, Visual novel			
June 30	Zero Time Dilemma	WIN		Adventure			

=== July–September ===
Release date	Title	Platform	Type	Genre	Developer	Publisher	Ref.
July 1	The Banner Saga 2	XBO		Tactical RPG			
July 1	Hawken	XBO		Vehicular combat, FPS			
July 5	The Banner Saga 2	PS4		Tactical RPG			
July 5	Furi	WIN, PS4		Action, Shoot 'em up, Hack and slash			
July 5	Lost Sea	WIN, PS4					
July 5	Megadimension Neptunia VII	WIN		RPG			
July 5	Romance of the Three Kingdoms XIII	WIN, PS4		Strategy			
July 6	Pokémon Go	iOS, DROID		AR, Geo game			
July 6	TerraGenesis	WIN		Simulation			
July 7	Inside	WIN		Puzzle-platformer, Adventure			
July 8	Carmageddon: Max Damage	PS4, XBO		Vehicular combat, Racing			
July 8	Hawken	PS4		Vehicular combat, FPS			
July 12	7th Dragon III Code: VFD	3DS		RPG			
July 12	Anarcute	WIN					
July 12	Assault Suit Leynos	PS4		Run and gun			
July 12	Ghostbusters	WIN, PS4, XBO		Shoot 'em up (twin-stick)			
July 12	Kerbal Space Program	PS4		Vehicle sim (spaceship)			
July 12	Mobile Suit Gundam: Extreme VS Force	PSV					
July 12	Necropolis	WIN, OSX, LIN		Action RPG			
July 12	Poly Bridge	WIN, OSX, LIN		Simulation, Puzzle			
July 12	Song of the Deep	WIN, PS4, XBO		Metroidvania			
July 12	Tumblestone	WIN, PS4, WiiU					
July 12	Under Night In-Birth Exe:Late	WIN		Fighting			
July 12	Videoball	WIN, PS4, XBO		Sports			
July 14	Batman: Arkham Underworld	iOS		Action-adventure, Stealth			
July 14	Fallout Shelter	WIN		CMS			
July 14	Gold Run	DROID, iOS					
July 14	Push Me Pull You	WIN, OSX, LIN					
July 15	Adrift	PS4		Adventure			
July 15	Monster Hunter Generations	3DS		Action RPG			
July 15	Obliteracers	PS4, XBO					
July 16	Tumblestone	XBO					
July 17	Undertale	LIN		RPG			
July 18	Earth Defense Force 4.1: The Shadow of New Despair	WIN		TPS			
July 19	10 Second Ninja X	WIN, PS4, XBO, PSV		Puzzle-platformer			
July 19	Aegis of Earth: Protonovus Assault	WIN		Strategy, RTT			
July 19	The Assembly	WIN, Quest, Vive					
July 19	I Am Setsuna	WIN, PS4		RPG			
July 19	Kentucky Route Zero Act 4	WIN		PCA			
July 19	Sword Coast Legends	PS4, XBO		Action RPG			
July 20	Letterpress	OSX		Word, TBS			
July 22	Death Road to Canada	WIN, OSX, LIN					
July 22	Human: Fall Flat	WIN		Puzzle-platformer			
July 22	Starbound	WIN, OSX, LIN		Action-adventure			
July 25	Phantom Brave PC	WIN		Tactical RPG			
July 25	Quadrilateral Cowboy	WIN		Puzzle, Adventure			
July 26	A.W.: Phoenix Festa	PSV					
July 26	Fairy Fencer F: Advent Dark Force	PS4		RPG			
July 26	Headlander	WIN, PS4		Metroidvania			
July 26	Hyper Light Drifter	PS4, XBO		Action RPG, Adventure			
July 26	Marvel: Ultimate Alliance	WIN, PS4, XBO		Action RPG			
July 26	Marvel: Ultimate Alliance 2	WIN, PS4, XBO		Action RPG			
July 26	Minecraft: Story Mode Episode 7 — Access Denied	WIN, PS3, PS4, XB360, XBO, iOS, DROID		Graphic adventure, Interactive film			
July 26	Mutant Mudds: Super Challenge	WIN, PS4, PSV		Platformer			
July 26	Shiren the Wanderer: The Tower of Fortune and the Dice of Fate	PSV		Roguelike, RPG			
July 28	Blade Arcus from Shining EX	WIN		Fighting			
July 28	Phoenix 2	iOS		Scrolling shooter	Firi Games		
July 28	Toukiden 2 (JP)	PS3, PS4, PSV		Action RPG			
July 29	Stardew Valley	OSX, LIN		Simulation, RPG			
August 2	Abzû	WIN, PS4		Adventure, Art, Simulation			
August 2	Batman: The Telltale Series — Episode 1: Realm of Shadows	WIN, OSX, PS3, PS4, XB360, XBO, iOS, DROID		Graphic adventure			
August 2	This Is the Police	WIN		Adventure, Strategy			
August 2	Tricky Towers	WIN, PS4		Puzzle			
August 3	Mobius Final Fantasy	iOS, DROID		RPG			
August 3	Overcooked	WIN, PS4, XBO		Simulation			
August 4	Etrian Odyssey V (JP)	3DS		RPG, Dungeon crawl			
August 5	Little King's Story	WIN		RTS, Life sim, RPG			
August 8	Transformers: Fall of Cybertron	PS4, XBO		TPS			
August 9	Bears Can't Drift?!	WIN, PS4					
August 9	Blade Ballet	WIN, PS4					
August 9	Brutal	PS4					
August 9	Caladrius Blaze	PS4		Shoot 'em up			
August 9	Heart&Slash	WIN, OSX, LIN					
August 9	No Man's Sky	PS4		Action-adventure, Survival			
August 9	Uno	WIN, PS4, XBO		Digital tabletop			
August 10	Ray Gigant	WIN		RPG			
August 11	Meridian Squad 22	WIN					
August 11	Reigns	WIN, iOS, DROID		Strategy			
August 11	Xblaze Lost: Memories	WIN		Visual novel			
August 12	No Man's Sky	WIN		Action-adventure, Survival			
August 16	Absolute Drift: Zen Edition	WIN, PS4		Racing			
August 16	Bound	PS4		Platformer, Art			
August 16	Conception II: Children of the Seven Stars	WIN		RPG			
August 16	Grow Up	WIN, PS4, XBO		Adventure, Platformer			
August 16	Hitman: Bangkok	WIN, PS4, XBO		Stealth			
August 16	The Huntsman: Winter's Curse	PS4					
August 16	Inversus	WIN, PS4					
August 18	Deus Ex Go	iOS, DROID		Puzzle			
August 18	The Girl and the Robot	WIN					
August 18	Okhlos	WIN, OSX, LIN		Action, Roguelike			
August 18	Savage Resurrection	WIN		RTS, FPS			
August 18	Tales of Berseria (JP)	PS4, PS3		Action RPG			
August 19	F1 2016	WIN, PS4, XBO		Racing			
August 19	Metroid Prime: Federation Force	3DS		FPS			
August 19	Style Savvy: Fashion Forward	3DS		Simulation			
August 22	Tempest	WIN, OSX					
August 23	Alone with You	PS4, PSV					
August 23	Deus Ex: Mankind Divided	WIN, PS4, XBO		Action RPG, FPS, Stealth			
August 23	Hue	WIN, PS4, PSV, XBO		Puzzle-platformer			
August 23	Inside	PS4		Puzzle-platformer, Adventure			
August 23	The King of Fighters XIV	PS4	Original	Fighting			
August 23	Madden NFL 17	PS3, PS4, XB360, XBO		Sports			
August 23	Metrico+	WIN, PS4, XBO		Puzzle-platformer			
August 23	Worms W.M.D	WIN, PS4, XBO		Artillery, Strategy			
August 24	Obduction	WIN, OSX, Quest		Puzzle, Adventure			
August 24	Valley	WIN, PS4, XBO		Action-adventure			
August 25	Master of Orion: Conquer the Stars	WIN, OSX, LIN		TBS			
August 25	Mugen Souls Z	WIN		RPG			
August 25	N++	WIN		Platformer			
August 25	Pan-Pan	WIN					
August 26	Steins;Gate 0 (JP)	WIN		Visual novel			
August 30	Armello	XBO		RPG, Digital tabletop			
August 30	Assault Suit Leynos	WIN		Run and gun			
August 30	Attack on Titan	WIN, PS4, PS3, PSV, XBO		Action, Hack and slash			
August 30	Champions of Anteria	WIN		RTS, Action RPG			
August 30	The Final Station	WIN, PS4, XBO		Shoot 'em up			
August 30	God Eater 2: Rage Burst	WIN, PS4, PSV		Action RPG			
August 30	God Eater: Resurrection	WIN		Action RPG			
August 30	Hatsune Miku: Project DIVA X	PS4, PSV		Rhythm			
August 30	One Way Trip	PS4					
August 30	Resident Evil 4	PS4, XBO		Survival horror, TPS			
August 30	Strike Vector EX	PS4		FPS			
August 30	The Turing Test	WIN, XBO		Puzzle			
August 30	Verdun	PS4, XBO		FPS			
August 30	World of Warcraft: Legion	WIN, OSX		MMO, RPG			
August 31	Shiny	WIN, XBO					
August 31	Tahira: Echoes of the Astral Empire	WIN, OSX, LIN		Tactical RPG			
September 1	Earthlock: Festival of Magic	XBO		RPG			
September 1	Lumines: Puzzle & Music	iOS, DROID		Puzzle			
September 1	One Piece: Burning Blood	WIN		Fighting			
September 2	Redout	WIN, Vive, Quest		Racing			
September 5	Mother Russia Bleeds	WIN, OSX, LIN		Brawler			
September 5	Space Rangers: Quest	WIN					
September 6	Forza Motorsport 6: Apex	WIN		Racing			
September 6	Just Sing	PS4, XBO		Music			
September 6	The Legend of Heroes: Trails of Cold Steel II	PS3, PSV		RPG			
September 6	Star Trek Online	PS4, XBO		MMO, RPG, TPS, Vehicle sim (spaceship)			
September 7	Oceanhorn: Monster of Uncharted Seas	PS4, XBO		Action-adventure			
September 7	Unbox	WIN					
September 8	Phoenix Wright: Ace Attorney - Spirit of Justice	3DS		Adventure, Visual novel			
September 8	Project Highrise	WIN, OSX		Simulation			
September 9	Ember	WIN, OSX, iOS		RPG			
September 9	Halcyon 6: Starbase Commander	WIN		Strategy, TBT, RPG			
September 9	Inferno Climber	WIN					
September 9	Toxikk	WIN		FPS			
September 13	BioShock: The Collection	PS4, XBO		FPS			
September 13	Dead Rising	WIN, PS4, XBO		Survival horror, Brawler			
September 13	Dead Rising 2	PS4, XBO		Action-adventure			
September 13	Dead Rising Triple Pack	PS4, XBO		Survival horror, Brawler, Hack and slash			
September 13	Feral Rites	Quest					
September 13	MeiQ: Labyrinth of Death	PSV		RPG, Dungeon crawl			
September 13	Minecraft: Story Mode Episode 8 — A Journey's End?	WIN, XB360, XBO, iOS, DROID		Graphic adventure, Interactive film			
September 13	Mystery Chronicle: One Way Heroics	WIN		RPG			
September 13	NASCAR Heat Evolution	WIN, PS4, XBO		Racing			
September 13	NHL 17	PS4, XBO		Sports			
September 13	Pac-Man Championship Edition 2	WIN, PS4, XBO		Maze			
September 13	Pro Evolution Soccer 2017	WIN, PS3, PS4, XB360, XBO		Sports			
September 13	Psycho-Pass: Mandatory Happiness	PS4, PSV		Visual novel			
September 13	ReCore	WIN, XBO		Action-adventure, Platformer			
September 13	Rive	WIN, PS4		Platformer, Shoot 'em up			
September 13	The Witness	XBO		Puzzle			
September 14	Avadon 3: The Warborn	WIN, OSX		RPG			
September 14	Conga Master	WIN					
September 14	Event 0	WIN, OSX		Adventure			
September 14	Minecraft: Story Mode Episode 8 — A Journey's End?	PS3, PS4		Graphic adventure, Interactive film			
September 14	SamuTale	WIN	Early access	MMO, Survival	Maple Media		
September 15	BioShock: The Collection	WIN		FPS			
September 15	Persona 5 (JP)	PS3, PS4		RPG, Social sim			
September 16	Diaries of a Spaceport Janitor	WIN		Adventure			
September 16	Dragon Quest VII: Fragments of the Forgotten Past	3DS		RPG			
September 20	Batman: The Telltale Series — Episode 2: Children of Arkham	WIN, OSX, PS3, PS4, XB360, XBO, iOS, DROID		Graphic adventure			
September 20	The Bunker	WIN, PS4		Adventure, Survival horror			
September 20	Cossacks 3	WIN		RTS			
September 20	Dear Esther: Landmark Edition	PS4, XBO		Adventure			
September 20	Destiny: Rise of Iron	PS4, XBO		Action RPG, FPS			
September 20	NBA 2K17	WIN, PS3, PS4, XB360, XBO		Sports			
September 20	Seraph	WIN					
September 20	Shin Megami Tensei IV: Apocalypse	3DS		RPG			
September 20	Slain: Back from Hell	PS4		Action, Platformer			
September 20	Tokyo Twilight Ghost Hunters Daybreak: Special Gigs	PS3, PS4, PSV		Adventure, Visual novel, Tactical RPG			
September 20	Wheels of Aurelia	WIN		Adventure, Visual novel			
September 20	Zenith	WIN, PS4					
September 21	Firewatch	XBO		Adventure			
September 21	Pankapu	WIN					
September 21	Toy Odyssey: The Lost and the Found	WIN, XBO					
September 22	Klang	WIN					
September 22	Virginia	WIN, PS4, XBO		Adventure			
September 23	Pavilion	WIN					
September 23	Warhammer 40,000: Eternal Crusade	WIN, OSX, LIN		TPS			
September 24	The Bunker	XBO		Adventure, Survival horror			
September 26	Adventure Time: I See Ooo	iOS, DROID					
September 27	Clustertruck	WIN		Platformer			
September 27	Darkest Dungeon	PS4, PSV		RPG, Dungeon crawl			
September 27	FIFA 17	WIN, PS3, PS4, XB360, XBO		Sports			
September 27	Forza Horizon 3	WIN, XBO		Racing			
September 27	Gal Gun: Double Peace	WIN		Shoot 'em up (rail)			
September 27	Hitman: Colorado	WIN, PS4, XBO		Stealth			
September 27	King's Quest: Chapter 4 — Snow Place Like Home	WIN, PS3, PS4, XB360, XBO		Adventure			
September 27	Lichtspeer	WIN, OSX, LIN, PS4		Action			
September 27	Sonic Boom: Fire & Ice	3DS		Action-adventure, Platformer			
September 27	XCOM 2	PS4, XOne		TBT, Tactical RPG			
September 29	Burly Men at Sea	WIN, OSX, iOS, DROID					
September 29	Demon Gaze II (JP)	PSV		RPG, Dungeon crawl			
September 29	Hybrid Wars	WIN					
September 29	The Metronomicon: Slay the Dance Floor	WIN, OSX		Action RPG			
September 30	Azure Striker Gunvolt 2	3DS		Action, Platformer			
September 30	Masquerada: Songs and Shadows	WIN					
September 30	Xenoraid	WIN					
September 30	Yo-kai Watch 2	3DS		RPG			

=== October–December ===
Release date	Title	Platform	Type	Genre	Developer	Publisher	Ref.
October 3	MegaTagmension Blanc + Neptune VS Zombies	WIN		RPG			
October 4	Aragami	WIN, PS4		Action-adventure, Stealth			
October 4	Atlas Reactor	WIN		TBT			
October 4	Necropolis	PS4, XBO		Action RPG			
October 4	Rocksmith 2014 Edition – Remastered	WIN, PS4, XBO		Music			
October 4	Shu	WIN, PS4					
October 4	Viking Squad	WIN, PS4					
October 4	Warhammer: End Times – Vermintide	PS4, XBO		FPS, Action			
October 5	Butcher	WIN					
October 5	Slain: Back from Hell	XBO		Action, Platformer			
October 5	Wheels of Aurelia	PS4, XBO		Adventure, Visual novel			
October 6	Duke Grabowski: Mighty Swashbuckler!	WIN, OSX		Adventure			
October 6	Invisible, Inc.	iOS		TBT, Stealth			
October 6	The Silver Case	WIN		Adventure, Visual novel			
October 6	Syndrome	WIN		Survival horror, FPS			
October 7	Beglitched	WIN					
October 7	Five Nights at Freddy's: Sister Location	WIN		Survival horror			
October 7	Mafia III	WIN, PS4, XBO		Action-adventure			
October 7	Paper Mario: Color Splash	WiiU		Action-adventure, RPG			
October 7	WRC 6	WIN, PS4, XBO		Racing			
October 10	100ft Robot Golf	PS4, PSVR		Sports			
October 10	Clockwork	WIN		Puzzle-platformer			
October 10	Thumper	WIN, PS4, PSVR		Rhythm			
October 11	Criminal Girls 2: Party Favors	PSV		RPG			
October 11	Dragon Quest Builders	PS4, PSV		Action RPG, Sandbox			
October 11	Duke Nukem 3D 20th Anniversary Edition World Tour	WIN, PS4, XBO		FPS			
October 11	Gears of War 4	WIN, XBO	Original	TPS			
October 11	Manual Samuel	PS4		Adventure			
October 11	Reus	PS4, XBO		God game, Simulation			
October 11	Rise of the Tomb Raider: 20 Year Celebration	PS4	Port	Action-adventure			
October 11	Valkyrie Drive: Bhikkhuni	PSV		Action			
October 11	WWE 2K17	PS3, PS4, XB360, XBO		Sports			
October 12	Gonner	WIN, OSX, LIN		Roguelike			
October 12	Mantis Burn Racing	WIN, PS4, XBO					
October 13	Ace Banana	PSVR					
October 13	The Assembly	PSVR					
October 13	Batman: Arkham VR	PSVR		Action-adventure, Stealth			
October 13	Battlezone VR	PSVR		FPS, RTS			
October 13	DriveClub VR	PSVR		Racing			
October 13	Eve Gunjack	PSVR		Shoot 'em up			
October 13	Eve: Valkyrie	PSVR		Vehicular combat, FPS			
October 13	Harmonix Music VR	PSVR		Music			
October 13	Here They Lie	PSVR					
October 13	Hustle Kings VR	PSVR		Sports			
October 13	Job Simulator	PSVR		Simulation			
October 13	Keep Talking and Nobody Explodes	PSVR		Puzzle			
October 13	Loading Human	PSVR					
October 13	PlayStation VR Worlds	PSVR					
October 13	Rez Infinite	PS4, PSVR		Shoot 'em up (rail), Music			
October 13	RIGS: Mechanized Combat League	PSVR		FPS, Sports			
October 13	Shadow Warrior 2	WIN		FPS			
October 13	SportsBarVR	PSVR					
October 13	Super Stardust Ultra VR	PSVR		Shoot 'em up			
October 13	SuperHyperCube	PSVR		Puzzle			
October 13	Until Dawn: Rush of Blood	PSVR		Interactive drama, Survival horror			
October 13	Wayward Sky	PSVR		Action			
October 13	World War Toons	PSVR					
October 14	Disney Magical World 2	3DS		Life sim			
October 14	DoDonPachi Resurrection	WIN		Bullet hell			
October 14	Farabel	WIN, OSX, LIN					
October 14	Manual Samuel	WIN, XBO		Adventure			
October 16	Skylanders: Imaginators	PS3, PS4, WiiU, XB360, XBO		RPG, Platformer			
October 18	Batman: Return to Arkham	PS4, XBO		Action-adventure, Stealth			
October 18	Crazy Machines 3	WIN					
October 18	Eagle Flight	Quest		Racing (sim)			
October 18	Exist Archive: The Other Side of the Sky	PS4, PSV		RPG			
October 18	The Jackbox Party Pack 3	WIN, OSX, PS4, XBO		Party	Jackbox Games	Jackbox Games	
October 18	Mordheim: City of the Damned	PS4, XBO		Tactical RPG			
October 18	Superdimension Neptune VS Sega Hard Girls	PSV					
October 19	HoPiKo	PS4, XBO					
October 20	Macross Delta Scramble (JP)	PSV		Shooter			
October 20	Mad Max	OSX, LIN		Action-adventure, Vehicular combat			
October 20	Pixel Gear	PSVR					
October 21	Battlefield 1	WIN, PS4, XBO		FPS			
October 21	Civilization VI	WIN		TBS			
October 21	Lego Harry Potter Collection	PS4		Action-adventure			
October 24	Kim	WIN, OSX		RPG			
October 25	Batman: The Telltale Series — Episode 3: New World Order	WIN, PS4, XBO		Graphic adventure			
October 25	Corpse Party	3DS		Survival horror			
October 25	Dragon Ball Xenoverse 2	PS4, XBO		Fighting, RPG			
October 25	Exile's End	PS4, PSV					
October 25	Ginger: Beyond the Crystal	WIN, PS4, XBO					
October 25	Hide and Shriek	WIN					
October 25	Just Dance 2017	WIN, PS3, PS4, Wii, WiiU, XB360, XBO		Music			
October 25	King's Quest: Chapter 5 — The Good Knight	WIN, PS3, PS4, XB360, XBO		Adventure			
October 25	Mark McMorris Infinite Air	WIN, PS4, XBO		Sports			
October 25	Tethered	PSVR					
October 25	World of Final Fantasy	PS4, PSV		RPG			
October 25	Yomawari: Night Alone	WIN, PSV		Survival horror			
October 26	Clockwork Empires	WIN, OSX					
October 26	Cookie Run: OvenBreak	DROID, iOS		Platformer			
October 27	Alice VR	WIN, Vive, Quest					
October 27	Berserk (JP)	PS3, PS4, PSV		Action RPG, Hack and slash			
October 27	Crows: Burning Edge (JP)	PS4					
October 27	Neo Atlas 1469 (JP)	PSV					
October 27	Through the Woods	WIN		Horror, Adventure			
October 27	Weeping Doll	PSVR					
October 28	Carnival Games VR	Vive, PSVR		Party			
October 28	Dragon Ball Xenoverse 2	WIN		Fighting, RPG			
October 28	The Elder Scrolls V: Skyrim — Special Edition	WIN, PS4, XBO	Remaster	Action RPG			
October 28	Titanfall 2	WIN, PS4, XBO		FPS	Respawn Entertainment	Electronic Arts	
October 31	Franchise Hockey Manager 3	WIN, OSX		Sports management			
October 31	Hitman: Hokkaido	WIN, PS4, XBO		Stealth			
October 31	The Ship: Remasted	WIN, LIN, OSX		Action			
November 1	BlazBlue: Central Fiction	PS3, PS4		Fighting			
November 1	Earth's Dawn	PS4, XBO					
November 1	Owlboy	WIN		Adventure, Platformer			
November 1	Root Letter	PS4, PSV		Adventure, Visual novel			
November 1	Seraph	PS4					
November 1	Super Dungeon Bros	WIN, PS4, XBO		Action RPG, Hack and slash			
November 2	House of the Dying Sun	WIN		Action			
November 3	Moto Racer 4	WIN, OSX, PS4, XBO		Racing			
November 3	Xanadu Next	WIN		Action RPG			
November 4	Call of Duty: Infinite Warfare	WIN, PS4, XBO	Original	FPS			
November 4	Call of Duty: Modern Warfare Remastered	WIN, PS4, XBO	Remaster	FPS			
November 4	Football Manager 2017	WIN, OSX, LIN		Sports management			
November 4	Mario Party: Star Rush	3DS		Party			
November 7	The Silver Case	OSX		Adventure, Visual novel			
November 7	Trillion: God of Destruction	WIN		RPG			
November 8	Cartoon Network: Battle Crashers	PS4, XBO, 3DS		Brawler			
November 8	Eagle Flight	PSVR		Racing (sim)			
November 8	Harvest Moon: Skytree Village	3DS		Farming, RPG, Puzzle			
November 8	Lethal VR	Vive		Shooting gallery			
November 8	Robinson: The Journey	PSVR					
November 8	Small Radios Big Televisions	WIN, PS4		Puzzle			
November 8	Sword Art Online: Hollow Realization	PS4, PSV		RPG			
November 8	Transport Fever	WIN		Business sim			
November 9	Beholder	WIN, OSX, LIN		Adventure, Strategy			
November 10	Fate/Extella: The Umbral Star (JP)	PS4, PSV		Action			
November 10	Motorsport Manager	WIN		Simulation, Sports management			
November 10	Senran Kagura: Bon Appetit! Full Course	WIN		Rhythm			
November 10	Tyranny	WIN, OSX, LIN		RPG			
November 10	Yesterday Origins	WIN, PS4, XBO		Graphic adventure			
November 11	Candle	WIN, OSX, LIN					
November 11	Dishonored 2	WIN, PS4, XBO		Action-adventure, Stealth	Arkane Lyon	Bethesda Softworks	
November 15	Assassin's Creed: Ezio Collection	PS4, XBO		Action-adventure, Stealth			
November 15	Ittle Dew 2	WIN, PS4, XBO		Action-adventure, RPG			
November 15	Lantern	Vive, Quest					
November 15	Mekazoo	WIN, PS4, XBO					
November 15	Silence	WIN		Adventure			
November 15	Watch Dogs 2	PS4, XBO	Original	Action-adventure			
November 16	RollerCoaster Tycoon World	WIN		CMS			
November 17	ICEY	WIN		Hack and slash			
November 17	Islands: Non-Places	WIN, OSX, LIN, iOS					
November 17	Little Briar Rose	iOS, DROID					
November 17	Planet Coaster	WIN		CMS			
November 17	Shenzhen I/O	WIN, OSX, LIN		Puzzle, Programming			
November 18	Killing Floor 2	WIN, LIN, PS4		FPS, Survival horror			
November 18	Pokémon Sun and Moon	3DS		RPG			
November 18	Runbow	WIN		Platformer, Racing			
November 22	Alicemare	WIN	Rerelease	Adventure	Miwashiba	Playism	
November 22	The Amnesia Collection	PS4		Survival horror, Adventure			
November 22	Batman: The Telltale Series — Episode 4: Guardian of Gotham	WIN, OSX, PS3, PS4, XB360, XBO, iOS, DROID		Graphic adventure			
November 22	Darksiders: Warmastered Edition	PS4, XBO		Hack and slash, Action-adventure			
November 22	Dragon Ball Fusions	3DS		RPG			
November 22	Total War: Warhammer	LIN		TBS, RTT			
November 23	Samurai Warriors: Sanada Maru (JP)	PS3, PS4, PSV		Hack and slash, Action			
November 28	BladeShield	Vive					
November 29	Darksiders: Warmastered Edition	WIN		Hack and slash, Action-adventure			
November 29	Final Fantasy XV	PS4, XBO		Action RPG			
November 29	Steins;Gate 0	PS4, PSV		Visual novel			
November 29	Watch Dogs 2	WIN	Port	Action-adventure			
November 30	Townsmen	WIN					
December 1	Apollo Justice: Ace Attorney	iOS		Adventure, Visual novel			
December 1	The Dwarves	WIN, OSX, LIN, PS4, XBO		Tactical RPG			
December 1	Maize	WIN		Adventure			
December 1	Rad Rodgers: World One	WIN					
December 2	Dungeon Souls	WIN		Roguelike, Adventure			
December 2	Furi	XBO		Action, Shoot 'em up, Hack and slash			
December 2	Little Briar Rose	WIN					
December 2	Steep	WIN, PS4, XBO		Sports			
December 2	Super Mario Maker for Nintendo 3DS	3DS		Level editor, Platformer			
December 3	Lara Croft Go	PS4, PSV		Puzzle			
December 3	Let It Die	PS4		Hack and slash			
December 3	Mother Russia Bleeds	PS4		Brawler			
December 3	Ultimate Marvel vs. Capcom 3	PS4		Fighting			
December 4	Lara Croft Go	WIN, OSX, LIN		Puzzle			
December 6	Abzû	XBO		Adventure, Art, Simulation			
December 6	Arizona Sunshine	Vive, Quest		FPS			
December 6	Carnival Games VR	Quest		Party			
December 6	The Climb	Quest		Platformer			
December 6	Dead and Buried	Quest					
December 6	Dead Hungry	Quest					
December 6	Dead Rising 4	WIN, XBO		Action-adventure			
December 6	Dexed	Quest					
December 6	Enigma Sphere	Quest					
December 6	Fantastic Contraption	Quest		Puzzle			
December 6	Final Approach	Quest					
December 6	HoloBall	Quest					
December 6	I Expect You To Die	Quest, PSVR		Action			
December 6	The Last Guardian	PS4		Action-adventure			
December 6	Oculus First Contact	Quest					
December 6	Pierhead Arcade	Quest					
December 6	Quar: Battle for Gate 18	Quest					
December 6	Ripcoil	Quest					
December 6	Shadow Tactics: Blades of the Shogun	WIN, OSX, LIN		RTT			
December 6	Sports Bar VR	Quest					
December 6	The Unspoken	Quest					
December 6	VR Sports Challenge	Quest					
December 6	Werewolves Within	Vive, Quest, PSVR		Social deduction			
December 7	Her Majesty's Spiffing	WIN, OSX, LIN, XBO		PCA			
December 7	ROM: Extraction	Vive, Quest					
December 8	Apollo Justice: Ace Attorney	DROID		Adventure, Visual novel			
December 8	Arcade Saga	Vive					
December 8	Bully: Anniversary Edition	iOS, DROID		Action-adventure			
December 8	Nitroplus Blasterz: Heroines Infinite Duel	WIN		Fighting			
December 8	Yakuza 6 (JP)	PS4		Action-adventure			
December 9	OneShot	WIN		Puzzle, Adventure			
December 9	Starly Girls: Episode Starsia (JP)	iOS, DROID					
December 12	Bastion	XBO		Action RPG			
December 12	Filthy Lucre	WIN					
December 13	Batman: The Telltale Series — Episode 5: City of Light	WIN, OSX, PS3, PS4, XB360, XBO, iOS, DROID		Graphic adventure			
December 13	Drive! Drive! Drive!	WIN, PS4					
December 13	Feist	PS4, XBO		Action			
December 13	The Little Acre	WIN, PS4, XBO		PCA			
December 13	Perfect	PSVR					
December 13	Stardew Valley	PS4		Simulation, RPG			
December 14	Lineage 2: Revolution	iOS, DROID		MMORPG	Netmarble Neo	Netmarble	
December 14	Guilty Gear Xrd: Revelator	WIN		Fighting			
December 14	Space Hulk: Deathwing	WIN		FPS			
December 14	Stardew Valley	XBO		Simulation, RPG			
December 15	Akiba's Beat (JP)	PS4		Action RPG			
December 15	Botolo	WIN, OSX					
December 15	SaGa: Scarlet Grace (JP)	PSV		RPG			
December 15	Super Mario Run	iOS		Endless runner, Platformer			
December 16	Perfect	Vive					
December 20	Eagle Flight	Vive		Racing (sim)			
December 20	Halo Wars: Definitive Edition	WIN, XBO		RTS			
December 20	Shantae: Half-Genie Hero	WIN, PS4, PSV, WiiU, XBO		Platformer, Metroidvania			
December 20	The Walking Dead: A New Frontier — Episode 1 & 2: Ties That Bind	WIN, OSX, PS4, XBO, iOS, DROID		Graphic adventure			
December 20	Wild Guns Reloaded	PS4		Shooting gallery			
December 22	Don Bradman Cricket 17	PS4, XBO		Sports			
December 22	Rollercoaster Dreams	PS4, PSVR					
