= Clockwork (disambiguation) =

Clockwork refers to devices powered by the energy of a wound spring released through a series of gears.

Clockwork or clock work may also refer to:

== People ==
- RL Grime, or Clockwork, American electronic artist

== Arts, entertainment, and media ==
=== Music ===
==== Albums ====
- Clockwork (Phrase album), 2009
- Clockwork, by Angelus Apatrida, 2010

==== Songs ====
- "Clockwork" (Easton Corbin song), 2014
- "Clockwork" (Juelz Santana song), 2006
- "Clockwork", by Ashley Roberts from Butterfly Effect, 2014
- "Clockwork", by Chelsea Grin from Ashes to Ashes, 2014
- "Clockwork", by Deadmau5, 2008
- "Clockwork", by Future User from SteroidsOrHeroin, 2015
- "Clockwork", by Laufey from A Matter of Time, 2025
- "Clockwork", by Northlane from Obsidian, 2022
- "Clockwork", by Structures from Divided By, 2011
- "Clockwork", by Taemin from Never Gonna Dance Again, 2020
- "Clockwork", by Within the Ruins from Phenomena, 2014
- "Clockworks", by Meshuggah from The Violent Sleep of Reason, 2016
- "Clockwork Vaudeville", by Steam Powered Giraffe from Album One, 2009

=== Other uses in arts, entertainment, and media ===
- Clockwerk, the main antagonist in the video game Sly Cooper
- Clockwork (film), a 1978 horror film directed by Sam Raimi
- Clockwork (novel), a 1996 children's book by Philip Pullman
- Clockwork (Danny Phantom), the Ghost Master of Time in the television show Danny Phantom
- "Clockwork", an episode of the television series Teletubbies
- Clockwork (video game), 2016 video game from Gamesoft
- Clock Works, Japanese port of ClockWerx

== Other uses ==
- Clockwork universe theory
- Wind-Up Toy, commonly called a "Clockwork Toy."

== See also ==
- A Clockwork Orange (disambiguation)
- C-ROCK WORK (pronounced "clockwork"), an album by Zelda
- Clockwise (disambiguation)
- Klocwork, a software company which produces Klocwork, a static code analysis tool
