= I'm Scared =

I'm Scared may refer to:

- I'm Scared, a 1951 science fiction short story by Jack Finney
- "I'm Scared", a song by Burton Cummings on his 1976 album Burton Cummings
- "I'm Scared", a song by Evelyn "Champagne" King on her album A Long Time Coming (A Change Is Gonna Come)
- I'm Scared, an album by the indie rock band Jacob's Mouse
- "I'm Scared", the B-side of the Brian May single "Too Much Love Will Kill You"
- "I'm Scared", a song in the film Small Soldiers
- "I'm Scared", a song by Duffy on her album Rockferry
- "I'm Scared", a song by Young Thug on his album So Much Fun
- "I'm Scared", a song by Bill Wurtz
- "I'm Scared", a song by Anirudh Ravichander from the 2023 Indian film Leo

== See also ==
- I'm Scared! I'm Scared!, a 2009 Indian film
- Imscared
