= OneShot =

2016 video game

- Developer: Future Cat LLC
- Publisher: KOMODO
- Producer: Mark Conforti
- Programmer: Eliza Velasquez; Michael Shirt
- Artists: Nightmargin; Eliza Velasquez
- Writers: Nightmargin; Eliza Velasquez; Michael Shirt
- Composers: Nightmargin; Eliza Velasquez; Michael Shirt
- Engine: RPG Maker XP
- Platforms: Windows macOS; Linux; Nintendo Switch; PlayStation 4 Xbox One
- Release: Windows; December 8, 2016 macOS; May 31, 2018; Linux; April 24, 2019; Switch, PS4, Xbox One; September 22, 2022
- Genres: Adventure, puzzle
- Mode: Single-player

OneShot is a 2016 puzzle adventure game developed by the indie studio Future Cat and published by KOMODO. Based on a free version made on June 30, 2014, it was released for Windows on December 8, 2016.

OneShot's gameplay and plot breaks the fourth wall and involve metafictional elements. Many of the puzzles involve interacting with the computer's operating system outside the game. The console version (or "World Machine edition") uses a fake, in-game operating system to fulfill this functionality. Narratively, the player is separate from the protagonist, Niko. The latter arrives in a world without sunlight and aims to restore it by replacing its sun, a large lightbulb, at the top of a tower.

OneShot was developed in RPG Maker XP. The game was well-received by critics, who praised the story, art, and metafictional aspects of gameplay, including the relationship between the player and Niko. In 2017, the game was nominated for the "PC Game of the Year" category at the Golden Joystick Awards.

A reworked console adaptation, OneShot: World Machine Edition, was released for Nintendo Switch, PlayStation 4, and Xbox One in September, 2022, on Windows and Linux in September 2024, and on Mac in April 2025.

== Gameplay ==
Some OneShot puzzles break the fourth wall; in this example, the player has to drag the game's window off-screen to reveal a code.

OneShot is a puzzle adventure game. The player controls Niko, a catlike child who is placed in an unfamiliar sunless world. The game exclusively shows Niko's viewpoint, employing a top-down perspective, while the player is separate, referred to by the name provided in their user account. Throughout the game, the player can make Niko sleep, causing the program to close; upon reopening, a short dream sequence is played showing Niko's old life with their mother.

The gameplay is composed of puzzles involving items. The player may use items at specific locations or combine them to create a new item. The player encounters computers, which signal that the player has to find content outside the game, including in the file system. These can also lead to interacting with the player's operating system in other ways, which include moving the game window off-screen, mimicking developing film, or changing the desktop wallpaper. Due to these concepts, the in-game instructions recommend playing in windowed mode instead of fullscreen. The version designed for consoles, OneShot: World Machine Edition, uses a simulated operating system that allows players to interact with the game like they would with a computer.

== Plot ==
Niko awakes in a dark and unfamiliar house. They (Note: Niko's gender is ambiguous, and the game's developers have refrained from answering questions on the subject. This article uses singular they for consistency.) interact with an in-game computer, which addresses the player using the current username taken from their computer. According to the machine, the world that Niko currently resides in is collapsing, and the player's goal is to guide them back to their homeworld. Niko discovers the world's sun, a lightbulb, and uses it to exit the house, emerging in a wasteland called the Barrens. There, they encounter a robot known as Prophetbot, which tells them that they are prophesied to save the world. Niko's goal is to carry the sun through the world's three areas and place it at the apex of a central tower to restore daylight. The robot teaches Niko to communicate with the player, telling Niko that the player is a god of the game's world whose responsibility is to guide the "Messiah" Niko. Niko meets Silver, a more sentient "tamed" robot, who gives them a piece of amber that Niko uses as a guide to the next area.

Niko in a Glen puzzle, presenting a dark atmosphere

Now in the arboreal Glen, Niko converses with the area's residents, including siblings Alula and Calamus, who give Niko a glowing feather. Niko uses it to create a feather pen to get past a guard robot, which lets them enter the urbanized third area, the Refuge, and travel down to the city's surface with the aid of a lamplighter. Arriving at a library, they are directed to George and get her attention with the help of researcher Kip Silverpoint. George translates Niko's book, a journal previously obtained from the Barrens. It states that the tower, which is controlled by an "entity", can be accessed using three phosphoric items: the amber, the feather, and a die given by George.

Arriving at the tower, Niko is unable to speak to the player; the entity informs that both have won and that Niko will return home. The player finds a note as their new desktop wallpaper, telling them how to reconnect with Niko. The player reappears and learns from a mysterious figure, "the Author", that the entity has become out of control and destructive. It explains that they can either break the sun and return Niko home, which would destroy the world, or place the sun at the top of the tower, trapping Niko in this world. Niko leaves the decision up to the player, forming the game's endings. If the player chooses to place the sun, the world becomes brighter, and in the credits, the characters are in awe. If the player chooses to destroy the sun, Niko hears their mother's voice outside the game's window before saying goodbye and walking offscreen.

=== Solstice path ===
After completing the game, a note appears in the user's Documents folder, allowing the player to continue on the alternate Solstice ending path. The beginning of Solstice is identical to the main game, but Niko already possesses the Author's journal. When Niko meets Silver in the Barrens and enters the mines, they travel to an observation room and meet Proto, an advanced prototype of the prophet robot. Proto reminds Niko of the events of the original storyline, which took place before this repeat. According to them, the world is a simulation, termed the World Machine; this new run is a reset of the machine. While attempting to leave, the World Machine causes a rockfall that crushes Silver and Proto. Niko takes a minecart to the Glen to escape.

In the Glen, Niko meets Calamus and Alula again and repairs the local mechanic Cedric's plane. Cedric says that his father was the Author, who created the World Machine to replace the previous world after its destruction. Niko and Cedric take his plane to the Refuge, and Cedric uses a backup memory disk to restore Proto, instructing Niko to find Rue, a sentient fox. Rue reveals that the World Machine is the original game's entity, and Niko's presence in the world corrupted it. Cedric and a restored Proto reappear, who, alongside Niko, enter the machine's inner system, "taming" it and reversing its destructive behavior. Niko places the sun at the tower and restores the world, resurrecting the characters that had died, and Niko returns home.

== Development and release ==
The game started as freeware. This initial version was made in a month on RPG Maker 2003 and released online on June 30, 2014, by creators Eliza Velasquez and Nightmargin (Casey Gu). It was developed as an entry for the engine's 2014 Indie Game Maker Contest, but it did not receive any accolades. Velasquez and Nightmargin initially believed their version was final, until Degica Games (later becoming KOMODO HAWAI'I) approached them to publish the game. This allowed for additional production time, enabling them to include everything they originally envisioned.

The 2016 version of OneShot was developed in RPG Maker XP. Developer Michael Shirt worked alongside Velasquez and Nightmargin to produce the 2016 version of the game; the three make up the indie studio Future Cat. It was also produced by Mark Conforti. Development of this version took 2 and a half years. In an interview with PC Gamer, Velasquez said that the fourth-wall-breaking nature of OneShot was inspired by Psycho Mantis from Metal Gear Solid, a character known to have telepathic powers by reading the player's memory card. In an interview with IGN Brasil, along with Metal Gear Solid, Velasquez and Nightmargin also cited Irisu Syndrome, Imscared, and Eternal Darkness: Sanity's Requiem as initial influences. They said the idea of a game where the player talks to their own character originated around 2011.

After being featured at the Game Developers Conference in March 2016, OneShot's finalized version was released on Steam on December 8. On March 28, 2017, a new ending that solved mysteries about the story, Solstice, was released. The game was shown at IndieCade in October. The game's macOS version was launched on May 31, 2018, with gameplay intended to be "as close to the Windows version as possible", and a Linux version was released on April 24, 2019. Both the Linux and Windows versions were later released on Itch.io on March 12, 2020.

On December 8, 2021, the developers announced that they were working on a release for Nintendo Switch, PlayStation 4, and Xbox One incorporating "new features designed for consoles" To be ported to consoles, the game was completely rebuilt, using a new engine instead of RPG Maker. On May 11, the next year, the Switch version was revealed as part of Nintendo's Indie World under the title OneShot: World Machine Edition. Versions for all three consoles were released on September 22. A Windows and Linux version of the World Machine Edition was released as a separate purchase in September 2024, including support for the Steam Deck, which was previously unable to play the game. On April 25, 2025, this was released on macOS.

== Reception ==
Reception

Aggregate scores
| Aggregator | Score |
|---|---|
| Metacritic | PC: 80/100; NS: 92/100 |
| OpenCritic | 93% recommend |

Review scores
| Publication | Score |
|---|---|
| Adventure Gamers | 3.5/5 (PC) |
| GamesMaster | 91% (PC) |
| Hardcore Gamer | 4.5/5 (PC) |
| MeriStation | 7/10 (PC) |
| Nintendo Life | 9/10 (NS) |
| TouchArcade | 4.5/5 (NS) |
| Vandal | 7/10 (PC) |

According to the review aggregator website Metacritic, the original Windows version of OneShot received "generally favorable reviews", with a score of 80 out of 100 based on eight reviews, while the World Machine Edition released for the Nintendo Switch received "universal acclaim", with a score of 92 out of 100 based on six reviews. The game has a 94% approval rating on OpenCritic based on 18 reviews.

The story and characters were praised. Borja Ruete of MeriStation described the script as well-written and captivating for the game's short length. He found the relationship between the player and Niko interesting, while Zoe Delahunty-Light of GamesMaster said that it was "lovely" forming a friendship with Niko throughout the game. Hardcore Gamer reviewer Spencer Rutledge described the story as easily conveying emotion. Rock Paper Shotgun's John Walker and Ramón Nafria of Vandal stated that its cast was of a wholesome, likeable nature. Conversely, Adventure Gamers reviewer Pascal Tekaia thought that the "alien feel" of the game made it difficult to relate to.

Opinions on the art direction were positive. Rutledge commended the art, while Delahunty-Light described the landscapes as enchanting. Although he found the thematic coloration interesting, Tekaia claimed the overall direction was too modest, with many of the game's environments being unnecessarily simple. Ruete praised the character and setting design but criticized that the graphics were repetitive as a result of the game being developed in RPG Maker. Nafria wrote that the graphics were humble but kept players hooked.

The gameplay received mostly positive responses, especially for its metafictional elements. Walker felt that his experience with OneShot's fourth-wall breaking gameplay was unique, and Delahunty-Light described it as immersive. Tekaia praised these interactions but opined that some players might dislike its interference with their computer. Nafria said that this aspect is one of the game's advantages, but criticized that walking around the game's individual environments felt tedious and unintuitive.

The soundtrack divided critics. Rutledge stated that the game's soundtrack matched its mood, with each area having an appropriate theme. Tekaia said that although it was restricted, the sound design paired well with it. In more negative notes, Ruete described it as monotonous and Nafria stated that it was generic and "not brilliant". Delahunty-Light described it as "haunting" and "nightmarish".

Regarding the Nintendo Switch World Machine edition, which has a simulated operating system, Lowell Bell of Nintendo Life criticized the cursor's controls and the in-game windows' size, adding that the pixelated details in windowed mode were hard to see, especially with a Switch outside its dock. Shaun Musgrave of TouchArcade stated that the game loses a few aspects in the transition, but praised that a player could still be engaged in the gameplay even after these changes.

In 2017, OneShot was nominated for the "PC Game of the Year" category at the Golden Joystick Awards, and received a nomination at IndieCade.
