= The Bridge (video game) =

2013 video game

- Developer: The Quantum Astrophysicists Guild
- Publisher: The Quantum Astrophysicists Guild
- Designers: Ty Taylor; Vega Castañeda
- Programmer: Ty Taylor
- Artist: Vega Castañeda
- Composer: Kevin MacLeod
- Engine: Unity
- Platform: Windows: Xbox 360, Linux, OS X, Android, Amazon Fire TV, Xbox One, Ouya, PlayStation 3, PlayStation 4, PlayStation Vita, Wii U, Nintendo Switch
- Release: February 22, 2013: Windows February 22, 2013 Xbox 360 November 13, 2013 Linux, OS X May 15, 2014 Android, Fire TV June 30, 2014 Xbox One August 14, 2015 Ouya, PlayStation 3, PlayStation 4, PlayStation Vita August 18, 2015 Wii U August 20, 2015 Switch September 7, 2017
- Genre: Puzzle
- Mode: Single-player

The Bridge is a 2013 puzzle video game designed by Ty Taylor and developed by The Quantum Astrophysicists Guild for Microsoft Windows. It was later ported to Linux, Mac OS X, Amazon Fire TV, Android, Xbox 360 (via Xbox Live Arcade), Xbox One, Ouya, PlayStation 3, PlayStation 4, PlayStation Vita, Wii U, and Nintendo Switch. The player controls an Escher-like character and the rotation of the 2D environment, which affects gravity based on the changing orientation of the landscape.

== Plot ==
The game opens with the nameless main character sleeping under an apple tree. After an apple hits him in the head and wakes him up, he is guided to his house with three doors, behind which lie further doors and levels. The story is explained through the environment and post-world text as the game progresses.

== Gameplay ==
The goal of each level is to get the main character to the exit door. The game's puzzles are inspired by the art of M. C. Escher and like his artworks, each level unfolds in grayscale with hand-drawn illustrations. The player can rotate the world using the arrow keys, changing the gravitational direction of individual objects, or control the main character with A and D to go left and right.

The Wii U version utilizes the GamePad touch and accelerometer. The player can use the GamePad's touch capabilities to interact with the world to move the character, open doors, activate objects, and interact with the menu system and UI. The player can also tilt the GamePad to rotate gravity in the game.

== Reception ==
Reception

Aggregate score
Aggregator	Score
Metacritic	PC: 74/100; X360: 76/100; XONE: 72/100; WIIU: 78/100; NS: 74/100

Review scores
Publication	Score
Eurogamer	6.0/10
Game Informer	7.5/10
GameSpot	7.5/10
Nintendo Life	8/10

The Bridge received positive reviews from critics. It has an aggregate score of 74/100 on Metacritic. The game won the 2012 Indie Game Challenge award for Achievement in Art Direction and Achievement in Gameplay.

== See also ==
- Tumblestone
