= Maldita Castilla =

2012 video game

- Developer: Locomalito
- Platforms: Windows, Linux, Ouya, Xbox One, PlayStation 4, Nintendo 3DS, Nintendo Switch
- Release: Xbox One: WW: July 20, 2016; PlayStation 4: JP: December 16, 2016; NA: December 16, 2016; PAL: January 11, 2017; Nintendo 3DS: JP: July 12, 2017; WW: July 13, 2017; Nintendo Switch: WW: January 24, 2019
- Genre: Platform
- Mode: Single-player

Maldita Castilla (lit. "Maledict Castile"), known in North America and PAL regions as Cursed Castilla, is a platform game developed by Locomalito and released in December 2012. The game is primarily based on myths from Spain, European folklore, and chivalry romances. Maldita Castilla was developed as a tribute to Ghosts'n Goblins.

== Gameplay ==
The original version of the game features six levels, 40 enemy types, and 4 bosses.

Defeating the boss enables the player to advance to the next level. Each of the game's levels corresponds to an era of history, and each has four different endings that vary depending on the tasks performed by the player.

The extended edition of Cursed Castilla features brand new content, including a total of 8 game stages, 48+ enemy types, and 19 final bosses. The player can get 15 unlockable achievements and go through 4 different endings.

== Plot ==
The action takes place around the year 1081, when an ancient demon hears Moura's laments for her fallen love and uses her tears to create a magic key, which unleashes demons into the Kingdom of Castile. King Alfonso VI of León orders Don Ramiro, Quesada, Don Diego, and Mendoza, to Tolomera to end the demonic nightmare that looms over the kingdom. As the demons get to his comrades, however, Don Ramiro must fight alone to rescue them and bring peace to the land.

== Development ==
Castilla is Spanish for Castile (a place of historic significance in Spain), while maldita, meaning "cursed" (also meaning "damned" or "maledict"), is used as an exclamation of anger at times of difficulty or danger. The game was inspired by Amadis of Gaul, a sixteenth-century Spanish chivalric romance.

The gameplay is inspired by the games Shinobi and Ghost and Goblins.

The original version of the game was released in December 2012 as a free download.

The audio of the game is meant to emulate the Yamaha YM2203 sound chip and there are effects to simulate the visual display of a Cathode-ray tube television.

Between 2012 and 2016, the game was available as a free download from the website of its author, Juan Antonio Becerra, who uses the pseudonym "Locomalito". The chiptune music was composed by Gryzor87, who was able to bring the unique feeling of the Sega Genesis sound chip.

In 2016, Juan Antonio Becerra signed an agreement with Abylight Studios to bring Locomalito titles, including Maldita Castilla, to consoles. Cursed Castilla extended edition includes brand new game stages, bosses, and enemies, as well as new songs from the original soundtrack and remastered audio.

The original game was developed in GML, the programming language used in GameMaker, which supports PC, PS4, Xbox One, and mobile, but not Nintendo 3DS. In order to port Cursed Castilla to Nintendo 3DS in the most efficient time possible, Abylight used the C++ Code generated by GameMaker to export the native mode and linked it to their own compatible API. The rest of the graphics, sounds, path, and elements were obtained by their development team from the GameMaker data files.

Abylight maximized the 3D features of the console by working on all the elements of Cursed Castilla to give an immersive experience and feeling of depth. Instead of reallocating secondary elements of the UI to the bottom screen of the Nintendo 3DS, the console was transformed into something similar to an arcade machine with controllers that are 100% functional.

== Release ==
Cursed Castilla was released on Xbox One in July 2016, on Windows in October 2016, and on PlayStation 4 in America and Japan in December 2016 and shortly after in Europe in January 2017.

In May 2017, Eastasiasoft Limited with Abylight Studios released a physical Limited Edition of Cursed Castilla for PlayStation 4. This includes the game disc and numbered certificate, among others, which was made available at the online retailer Playasia.

In July 2017, Cursed Castilla was released to Nintendo 3DS, and features the new coin-op mode and a stereoscopic 3D effect. Abylight Studios teamed up again with Eastasiasoft to bring the game to PlayStation Vita, and it was released in September 2017 in America and November 2017 in Europe. Aside from the digital release on the PlayStation Store in November 2017, a physical Limited Edition was exclusively released at the online retailer Playasia, making it the second physical release of the game after the PS4 Limited Edition.

In January 2019, Cursed Castilla was released for the Nintendo Switch on the Nintendo eShop. The game runs at 60fps for the console's docked and handheld mode.

In October 2019, Cursed Castila was ported to iOS, where players can play in landscape or portrait orientation using the touch screen or a controller. It also features Game Center achievements and leaderboards, among others. The game was released for Apple TV in 2021.

In May 2021, the Cursed Castilla Collector's Edition, which includes an exclusive physical copy of the game for the Nintendo Switch and other collectible items, was released by Abylight Studios through their online Abylight Shop and across game stores in Spain, as well as through Limited Run for the United States.

== Reception ==
Reception

Aggregate score
Aggregator	Score
OpenCritic	84% recommend

Review scores
Publication	Score
Famitsu	3DS: 29/40
GamesTM	8/10
IGN	IGN Italia: 8.5/10; IGN España: 8/10
M! Games	Xbox One: 79/100
Nintendo Life	3DS: 9/10; NS: 8/10
The Games Machine	7.9/10
Hobby Consolas	Xbox One: 85/100; 86/100

Maldita Castilla was well received by Spanish press with reviewers giving the game high scores.

Four reviewers for Famitsu gave the 3DS version scores of 7, 7, 7, and 8 for a total of 29 out of 40.

Nintendo Life gave the 3DS version of the game a 9/10. They gave the switch version a 8/10.

IGN Italia gave the game an 8.5 out of 10 and IGN España gave the game an 8 out of 10.

M! Games gave the Xbox One version of the game a 79 out of 100.

The Games Machine gave it 7.9 out of 10.

Eurogamer praised and recommended the game.

== See also ==
- Pharaoh Rebirth
