= A Clockwork Orange =

A Clockwork Orange or Clockwork Orange may refer to:

- A Clockwork Orange (novel), a 1962 novel by Anthony Burgess
  - A Clockwork Orange (film), a 1971 film directed by Stanley Kubrick based on the novel
    - A Clockwork Orange (soundtrack), the film's official soundtrack
    - A Clockwork Orange: Wendy Carlos's Complete Original Score, a 1972 album by Wendy Carlos featuring music composed for the film
  - A Clockwork Orange: A Play with Music, a 1987 theatrical adaptation by Anthony Burgess
- Clockwork Orange (plot), a supposed 1970s operation to discredit British politicians
- "Clockwork Orange", a nickname for the Glasgow Subway in Glasgow, Scotland
- "Clockwork Orange", a nickname in the early 1970s for the Netherlands national football team

== See also ==
- "A Clockwork Origin", an episode of the US TV series Futurama
