= No Pineapple Left Behind =

2016 video game

- Developer: Subaltern Games
- Engine: Unity
- Platforms: Windows, Macintosh, Linux
- Release: 18 February 2016
- Genre: Simulation
- Mode: Single-player

No Pineapple Left Behind is a 2016 video game by independent developer Subaltern Games. The game is a simulation game in which players manage a school and teachers to maximise the obedience and test results of their students. No Pineapple Left Behind was conceived by developer Esther Alter, a former teacher, as a satirical commentary on the No Child Left Behind American federal education policy. Reviews of the game were mixed, with critics praising the effectiveness of the game's premise and political message, although critiquing the execution of the game's design and mechanics.

== Gameplay ==
Players manage classes by casting spells at the cost of a teacher's energy.

No Pineapple Left Behind is a management simulation game where players manage a school by hiring teachers, managing their energy levels, and using spells to increase the grades of students at a cost to their humanity. When students reach the lowest level of humanity, they turn into pineapples, who do not have distractions, perform better academically and help the school meet its performance targets to maintain funds. When teachers are exhausted of energy, they can be burn out and fail teaching, causing grades to decrease and the school to lose money. The player can fire teachers before this occurs.

== Development and release ==
No Pineapple Left Behind was created by Cambridge, Massachusetts-based independent developer Esther Alter, who founded the studio Subaltern Games in 2012. Alter stated that the game was created to raise awareness of "systemic problems" relating to the No Child Left Behind Act and the charterization of schools, with Alter drawing from her experiences as a sixth grade mathematics teacher. The title of the game satirizes the use of a nonsensical narrative titled "The Hare and the Pineapple", a story attributed to Daniel Pinkwater used in a standardised test in New York grade schools. In 2015, the game was showcased at the Boston Festival of Indie Games, and the Game Developers Conference. No Pineapple Left Behind was released in February 2016, shortly after the repeal of the No Child Left Behind Act in December 2015.

== Reception ==
Several critics expressed that the game's themes of No Pineapple Left Behind were effective. Leif Johnson of Vice considered the game to be a "depressing" game that "succeeds brilliantly in delivering its message" and "paints the modern American educational system as a tidy gulag archipelago". Describing the critiques of the game as hitting "close to home", Alex Newhouse of GameSpot stated the game reflected their own "irritation I had felt at points during my time in public school" and felt it had potential as a "dark, witty and entertaining look at American schools". Alec Meer of Rock Paper Shotgun felt the game's encouragement of players "natural inclination to follow directives and make numbers go up" at the cost of "human concern about the consequences" reflected the "invidious dilemma the staff of under-resourced schools can find themselves in.".

Reviews of the game's alpha also felt that its design was less effective at conveying its message than its premise. Newhouse considered the game's alpha was a "rough experience" and "questioned whether or not this game will have lasting appealed", finding the "menus to be cluttered and confusing" and the presentation to be "obtuse". Johnson stated the game was "barely fun to look at" and lacked strategy, although stating that the "superfluity" of the game's "cluttered interface" unintentionally reinforced the message of the game. Meer stated the game was "simple" and "slightly rickety", stating the game "becomes repetitious all too soon" and many of the management elements were "time consuming", feeling the game "might be mighting off a little more than it can chew by ostensibly involving management of an entire school".
