= Slain! =

2016 video game

- Developer: Wolf Brew Games
- Publisher: Digerati Distribution
- Designers: Thomas Jenns; Christian Bliss
- Programmer: Thomas Jenns
- Artist: Andrew Gilmour
- Composer: Curt Victor Bryant
- Platforms: Microsoft Windows, OS X, Linux, PlayStation 4, Xbox One, PlayStation Vita, Nintendo Switch
- Release: Original version Microsoft Windows, OS X, Linux: WW: 24 March 2016; Back from Hell; Microsoft Windows: WW: August 1, 2016; PlayStation 4: NA: September 20, 2016; PAL: December 5, 2016; Xbox One: WW: October 21, 2016; PlayStation Vita: NA: November 22, 2016; EU: November 23, 2016; Nintendo Switch: WW: December 7, 2017
- Genre: Platform
- Mode: Single-player

Slain! is a platform game developed by Wolf Brew Games and published by Digerati Distribution. The game shares similarities in tone and design to the Castlevania series, with elements of medieval Gothic architecture and heavy metal. The game was received negatively at launch and was overhauled and relaunched as Slain: Back from Hell. The updated version received higher review scores.

== Development ==
Slain! was developed by Wolf Brew Games. The game was initially scheduled to be released in late 2015, but was delayed to 24 March 2016. Due to the negative reception of Slain!, the game was overhauled and relaunched as Slain: Back from Hell on 2 August of the same year. It was released on the Nintendo Switch, in North America and Europe on December 7, 2017, and in Japan on March 1, 2018.

== Reception ==
Reception

Aggregate score
Aggregator	Score
Metacritic	(PC) 40/100; Back from Hell (PC) 74/100 (PS4) 68/100 (XONE) 69/100 (NS) 47/100

Slain! received "mixed or average" and "generally unfavorable" reviews, depending on a platform, according to review aggregator website Metacritic.
