= Phoenix 2 =

2016 video game

- Title image featuring the Phoenix ship.
- Developer: Firi Games
- Publisher: Firi Games
- Designer: El Drijver
- Programmer: Tijmen Roberti
- Composer: Niels van der Leest
- Platforms: iOS, Android, PC, Steam Deck
- Release: WW: July 28, 2016
- Genre: Shoot 'em up
- Mode: Single-Player

Phoenix 2 is a freemium mobile game developed and self published by Dutch indie studio Firi Games, released for iOS on July 28, 2016, and the sequel to Phoenix HD... It is a vertical scrolling shooter where the player controls a ship via touch to destroy enemy ships flying in from the top of the screen. New missions are generated daily.

== Gameplay ==
In Phoenix 2, players receive a new set of generated missions every day and the goal is to complete these with the ships they have at their disposal. There are a total of 100 ships to collect and they each perform differently in missions due to their unique weapon, primary Aura ability and secondary Zen ability. Ships can be unlocked using in-game currency or obtained via a gacha style mechanic named the Warp Gate.

The ship is controlled via relative touch and fires automatically when the player touches the screen. The Aura ability needs to be charged by collecting energy from destroyed enemy ships and can be activated by touching the screen with a second finger. The Zen ability is activated by not touching the screen, generally for a short period of time, so the player ship is not able to shoot or move.

Each of the generated missions is a unique configuration of enemy ships and players need to destroy them all to complete the mission. All players have access to the same daily missions and compete via their personal progress on a leaderboard for each individual mission. Missions from previous days can no longer be played, but the leaderboards are visible to those who participated.

== Development ==
The player's ship fighting enemies.

Phoenix 2 has featured several post-release updates. In 2017 it was used by Apple Inc in retail stores to demonstrate 120fps capabilities of the iPad Pro when it introduced the 120 Hz screen technology ProMotion. In 2020 Phoenix 2 used Apple's App Clip to create a playable introduction without having to install the game. This experience was much like a game demo from the past and Phoenix 2's use of the feature is used by Apple as an example in its Developer videos.

Phoenix 2 was released on the Google Play Store on December 30, 2023. After a period of Early Access, Phoenix 2 has been released on Steam (service) with support for Windows and Steam Deck.

== Reception ==
Reception

Review scores
Publication	Score
Pocket Gamer	3.5/5
TouchArcade	4/5

Phoenix 2 launched with positive reviews and was featured as Game Of The Day on the Apple App Store. PocketGamer notes that it's an improvement over its predecessor but criticises the difficulty of the game, concluding that it "could have done with being a touch more forgiving when you're in the thick of it.". TouchArcade gave it a positive review, summarising “I can see a few key aspects where Phoenix 2 could really improve in order to be a better experience, or at least are shortcomings that are tough to adjust. But regardless, the core concept behind Phoenix 2 is great, and it does a great job at being a game worthy of playing daily.”. A review from 2017 by Edamame on the other hand is positive about the challenging gameplay but also writes "Much as we love this game, there is one aspect we definitely don't love. The UI (User Interface) isn't exactly great.". A review from 2020 by Superjump praises the gameplay and the freemium approach, its conclusion mentions "The variety of ships and levels keeps Phoenix 2 engaging and interesting."
