= SamuTale =

2016 video game

- Developer: Maple Media
- Publisher: Maple Media
- Engine: Unity
- Platform: Microsoft Windows
- Release: September 14, 2016
- Genres: MMORPG, survival
- Mode: Multiplayer

SamuTale is a massively multiplayer sandbox survival game, developed and published by Maple Media. The official early access release date was September 14, 2016. The game is currently only available for Microsoft Windows and can be played by purchasing a "Founder's Pack" on the official SamuTale website.

== Gameplay ==
Players can explore the game's vast open world set in the time of the samurai featuring building, farming, crafting, horse riding, clan wars and much more. SamuTale grants players freedom to do as they please, whether that be to build up their own village, harvest crops, craft, or join a clan and engage in pitched battles with other clans.

In April 2020, the game launched a major new update featuring a completely revamped game world with six different biomes to explore. The update also added the long-awaited raiding mechanics to the game which gives players the ability to attack and plunder each other's clan villages.
