= Life in Bunker =

2016 video game

- Developer: Flox Studios
- Publisher: Flox Studios
- Platforms: Windows, macOS, SteamOS, Linux

Life in Bunker is a sandbox construction and management simulation game developed by Flox Studios. It was released on 25 February 2016 for Microsoft Windows, Mac OS, SteamOS and Linux.

== Gameplay ==
The surface of the earth is uninhabitable, and the player uses several characters to manage resources such as air, food, water, and minerals in an underground bunker to ensure survival until life outdoors can resume. The bunker has four levels so that the player can expand the size of the bunker. The layout is different every time you play. Events such as disease and mechanical failures occur to challenge the player. Characters can specialize in different skills, and need to be replaced by the younger generation when they get old and leave the workforce.

== Reception ==
The game scored a 3 out of 5 in The Escapist.
