= Tumblestone =

2016 video game

- Developer(s): The Quantum Astrophysicists Guild
- Publisher(s): Nighthawk Interactive
- Designer(s): Ty Taylor
- Programmer(s): Alex Schearer
- Artist(s): Vega Castañeda
- Writer(s): Justin Nafziger
- Composer(s): M.J. Quigley
- Engine: Unity
- Platform(s): Linux, macOS, Wii U, Windows, Xbox One, PlayStation 4, Android, iOS, Nintendo Switch
- Release: July 12, 2016: Linux, macOS, Wii U, Windows; July 12, 2016; Xbox One; July 16, 2016; PlayStation 4; July 26, 2016; Android, iOS; July 31, 2017; Nintendo Switch; October 5, 2017
- Genre(s): Match-3, Action
- Mode(s): Single-player, multiplayer

Tumblestone is a 2016 match-3 game developed by The Quantum Astrophysicists Guild and published by Nighthawk Interactive. The game was digitally released on the Nintendo eShop and launched for PC, Mac, and Linux on July 12, 2016. It was published on the Xbox One on July 16, and released for retail on Wii U and PlayStation 4 on August 30, 2016.

The Nintendo Switch version was released on October 5, 2017. Since its debut, Tumblestone has been critically acclaimed for its take on the puzzle genre.

== Gameplay ==
=== Main game ===
Tumblestone is a 2D puzzle game that tasks the player with clearing every square, known as tumblestones, from a board. In Tumblestone's story mode, the player progresses through a map of 12 worlds. Each level has an enclosed space that is filled with colored squares; the player must keep matching three squares of the same color until the space is clear. Modifiers are added to the gameplay for each world, including gray blocks that toggle on and off called "togglers" and multicolored blocks called "wildcards" that when selected can pair with any color on the wildcard itself.

The player may choose to skip levels with tokens earned midway through a world. At the end of each world, the player battles in a "puzzle race", a challenge in which the player must clear a grid three times before the upcoming character does.

=== Side games ===
==== Single-player ====
Tumblestone has three single-player arcade modes. Heartbeat Mode involves the player constantly eliminating blocks from a descending wall, Marathon Mode has a glass wall as its main twist, and Infinipuzzle has an infinite grid of blocks on which the player has to focus to clear grids for as long as possible.

== Plot ==
Queen Cleo, the ruler of a desert kingdom, encounters colored blocks with faces known as "tumblestones". Cleo meets the Goblin King, who discovers that an ancient artifact known as the "Tumblecrown" exists. The Goblin King ventures to other lands.

== Development ==
While developing The Bridge, founder Ty Taylor met artist Vega Castañeda. In an interview, Taylor stated, "once [he] learned how to make videogames, [he] was always doing it". The Bridge was released on Steam and won in the 2012 Indie Game Challenge for Achievement in Art Direction and Gameplay.

The concept for Tumblestone was invented during a 48-hour game jam, where he met writer Justin Nafziger and programmer Alex Schearer, the latter of whom had prior experience at Microsoft. The theme was "Rainbows and Perseverance". Taylor worked with Nafziger, Schearer, and Castañeda to produce a prototype that began as a Space Invaders-like game in which the player has to shoot three identical, moving, colored ships in a row into still blocks using a specific concept.

At PAX 2015, Tumblestone was part of the PAX 10 program in which 10 indie games are selected for the public to playtest.

== Reception ==
Reception

Aggregate scores
Aggregator	Score
Metacritic	71/100 (Xbox One); 91/100 (PC); 82/100 (Wii U)
OpenCritic	81/100; 71% Critics Recommend

Review scores
Publication	Score
Destructoid	8.5/10
Nintendo Life	9/10
Nintendo World Report	8/10

On the review aggregator website Metacritic, Tumblestone had average scores of 71, 91, and 82 for its Xbox One, PC, and Wii U versions respectively. On OpenCritic, the game has a "strong" approval rating, with a Critics Recommend score of 71%.

=== Accolades ===
Tumblestone won the award for "Best Puzzle Game" at Intel Level Up 2015.
