= Toxikk =

2015 video game

- Developer: Reakktor Studios
- Publisher: Reakktor Studios
- Director: Martin Schwiezer
- Engine: Unreal Engine 3
- Platform: Microsoft Windows
- Release: September 13, 2016
- Genre: First-person shooter
- Mode: Multiplayer

Toxikk is an Arena FPS video game by Hanover, Germany-based software developer Reakktor. The game is built on the Unreal Engine 3. The beta was released for Windows via Steam Early Access on 22 January 2015. The game got a full release on September 13, 2016.
