= Her Majesty's Spiffing =

2016 video game

Her Majesty's SPIFFING
- Retail cover art
- Developer: Billy Goat Entertainment Ltd
- Publisher: Billy Goat Entertainment Ltd
- Platforms: Xbox One; PlayStation 4; Microsoft Windows; Linux; iOS; Android; Nintendo Switch
- Release: Microsoft Windows, Xbox One; 7 December 2016; PlayStation 4; 14 December 2016; iOS, Android; 4 May 2017; Nintendo Switch; 1 February 2018
- Genres: Adventure, point-and-click
- Mode: Single-player

Her Majesty's SPIFFING (also known as Her Majesty's SPIFFING: The Empire Staggers Back) is an adventure video game developed and published by Billy Goat Entertainment Ltd. It was released worldwide for the Xbox One, PlayStation 4, Windows, and PCs running Linux on 7 December 2016. The game is set after the United Kingdom's withdrawal from the European Union and the queen's use of the royal prerogative to take control over the country herself and the subsequent set up of a space organisation called SPIFFING. The plot follows Captain Frank Lee English and his Welsh subordinate Aled Jones in their attempts to establish a galactic British Empire.

== Gameplay ==
The game features many elements from point-and-click adventure games. In this screenshot, English, the player-character, is making a cup of tea.

Her Majesty's SPIFFING is point-and-click-style adventure game.

== Plot ==
The game is set shortly after the United Kingdom's withdrawal from the European Union. Dismayed by its political turmoil and isolation, the queen invokes the royal prerogative to dissolve parliament and take control over the county herself in an attempt to make Britain great again. Recognising the difficulties in re-conquering a quarter of the Earth's surface, the queen creates a new space organisation called SPIFFING (Special Planetary Investigative Force For Inhabiting New Galaxies) with the intention of establishing a galactic British Empire. After preparations made in Hounslow Mission Control, Big Ben is launched into space and a fleet of colonists set course for planets in the Milky Way.

On board the HMSS Imperialise (a converted Mini Cooper), Captain Frank Lee English, along with his Welsh subordinate Sub-lieutenant Aled Jones, lead the colonisation effort. English is a middle class, well mannered man with militaristic experience whereas Jones is wryly incompetent. After finding a barren planet fit for colonisation, the two land on it only to discover that it has been claimed by the French. After exploring the planet further, English and Jones discover two French colonists; the first man, Antoine, is a short Napoleon lookalike whereas the other is a gorilla named Pierre. Antoine explains that he intends to terraform the planet and plant masses of vineyards so that he could produce fine wine, with his ultimate goal of ensuring that the people of his empire will eat crêpes, wear berets and ride bicycles. English decides that he must remove the presence of the French along with their flag before he can legitimately claim the world. To accomplish this, he throws a frog and cheddar cheese at the French colonists, with both deciding to retreat to their Concorde. After replacing the Tricolore with the Union Jack, the French concede defeat shortly before their Concorde explodes due to a fire. As English and Jones run for cover, a platoon of American soldiers arrive on the planet. Seeing that the world has already been claimed, they decide to leave, disliking the British weather.

== Development ==
We knew it was always going to be difficult, we didn't have a proper back catalogue and we were this obscure Belfast-based indie developer. It didn't work out and we needed to lay some people off. The plan was always to try and do it again.

— William Barr explaining the preliminary planning in an interview with MCV.

The game was developed by Belfast-based Billy Goat Entertainment Ltd, a studio formerly specialising in animated advertisements for Irish television. According to William Barr—director and designer of Her Majesty's SPIFFING—the game was originally set to be a short animated film, however Barr realised that a film would be more difficult to fund than an adventure game. Barr also reflected that the studio had some experience with outsource game development for other studios, and cited 1990s LucasArts point-and-click video games as a major inspiration. Since the game was to be the studio's debut title, a Kickstarter proposal was submitted in hopes that the game would receive adequate funding, but "failed awfully" according to Barr. The proposal ended shy of £12,000, raised from a total of 338 backers. The studio recognised the difficulties in creating a new video game as Barr reflected that his studio was an obscure indie game developer and did not have a back catalogue. Despite this, a second Kickstarter proposal was submitted in November 2014 to greater success. The studio had asked for £30,000 in funds and also received finance from Northern Ireland Screen, as well as benefiting from UK video game tax breaks. Furthermore, the team had to use work for hire and a substantial overdraft.

Due to the outcome of the United Kingdom European Union membership referendum, the game had to be rewritten and some jokes adjusted in order for some parts to make sense. For example, a self destruct button in the player-character's spaceship has an Article 50 sticker imprinted on it, and the game also contains some references to Nigel Farage. Barr thought that the game could benefit from these references and the outcome of Brexit and even hoped that it would be marked as the "Official Brexit Game", but was concerned that a European audience would find its tone arrogant. In light of this, the team had to make some adjustments while trying to keep game's satirical tone. As a result of this, a late addition to the game was to add in the option of using either an English voice or an American voice. If American dialogue is chosen, a laugh track is played after an appropriate joke so that its audience would be able to understand whenever a joke is happening.

The team wanted to ensure that the player would have a closer connection with the protagonist as opposed to feeling of "disconnect" between the two in typical point-and-click adventure games. Barr compared the feeling of disorganisation with games like The Sims and The Curse of Monkey Island, where he opined that the player always had to suggest an action as opposed to physically participating themselves. To counteract this, the team tried to alleviate the sense of disconnect by giving the player direct control of the protagonist, resembling that of an ordinary third-person adventure game. Barr took further comparison to traditional point-and-click titles which involved mundane gameplay tasks, and stressed that he wanted to make Her Majesty's SPIFFING more responsive and immersive. Barr also explained that keeping the Captain English on-screen at all times instead of viewing it through his point of view would allow them to design a more personable and endearing character, as well as helping the player bond with English.

== Reception ==
Reception

Aggregate score
| Aggregator | Score |
|---|---|
| Metacritic | 66% (XONE); 60% (PC); 74% (PS4); 68% (NS) |

Review scores
| Publication | Score |
|---|---|
| Adventure Gamers | 3/5 |
| IGN | 8/10 |
| Gaming Age | B |

Her Majesty's SPIFFING received mixed reviews upon release. The Xbox One version holds an average score of 66% at Metacritic, based on an aggregate of eight reviews, the PC version a score of 60% based on five reviews, the PlayStation 4 version a score of 74%, based on four reviews, and the Nintendo Switch version a score of 68%, based on four reviews.

Miguel Escudero from the Spanish IGN. Peter Mattson from Adventure Gamers. Matthew Pollesel from Gaming Age.
