= Eagle Flight =

2016 virtual reality simulation video game

- Developer: Ubisoft Montreal
- Publisher: Ubisoft
- Directors: Charles Huteau; Olivier Palmieri
- Programmer: Vicki Ferguson
- Composer: Inon Zur
- Platforms: Microsoft Windows; PlayStation 4
- Release: Microsoft Windows: WW: October 18, 2016; PlayStation 4: WW: November 8, 2016
- Genres: Simulation, racing
- Modes: Single-player, multiplayer

Eagle Flight is a virtual reality simulation video game developed by Ubisoft Montreal and published by Ubisoft. It was released for Microsoft Windows and PlayStation 4 in late 2016. Players must have a virtual reality headset, such as the Oculus Rift, PlayStation VR, or HTC Vive, in order to play the game.

The game is set fifty years after humanity's extinction, focusing on a post-apocalyptic version of Paris. Players assume control of an eagle, which must travel around the city and defeat rival animals in order to build its nest on five different landmarks. Gameplay revolves around players tilting their heads to control the movement of the eagle, and using sonar waves to defeat enemies. The game also features a six-player competitive multiplayer Capture the Flag-styled mode, and a cooperative multiplayer mode called Free Flight, which allows the player to explore the city with five other players.

Development of the game began in October 2014 after the completion of Far Cry 4. The game was greenlit in mid-2015, through Ubisoft's own idea-pitching platform, Fun House. The game was originally set in Notre Dame de Paris, but the scale was later expanded to include the entire city. To reduce the possibility of players suffering from motion sickness, the team researched extensively and read NASA's articles and documents on the subject. Inon Zur served as the game's composer; the soundtracks were described as "soaring and uplifting".

Announced at PlayStation Experience 2015, the game was the first virtual reality game developed by Ubisoft. It received mixed to positive reviews upon its release, with critics praising the game's controls, gameplay, and the competitive multiplayer mode, but criticizing the single-player mode and city's design.

== Setting ==
In the near future, fifty years after humanity's extinction, wildlife in Paris is flourishing. Nature has reclaimed the land, and the city has become home to various animals and plants. As an eagle inhabiting the city, the player must explore it, venturing to different landmarks to build a nest. According to Ubisoft, the goal of the game is to "[build a] nest on Paris' tallest landmark and conquer the skies".

== Gameplay ==
Eagle Flight is a first-person, simulation game, which tasks players to assume control of an eagle. As the bird moves forward continuously, its direction is controlled by the player's head movement. For instance, if the player tilts their head to the left, the eagle will turn in that direction. The player also uses a controller to slow down or speed up the eagle's flight speed.

Set in a post-apocalyptic version of Paris in the near future, the game's backstory is revealed to the player by a narrator. The single-player mode consists of five different districts. Each district has one chapter, which tasks players to build nests on landmarks after defeating the rival wildlife guarding them. Earlier chapters require players to explore the landmark; later chapters usually end with a race challenge where players must pass through numerous rings while evading attacks from enemies, such as falcons, crows, vultures, and bats. The eagle can also use sonic waves to kill its enemies. In addition to completing story missions, players can also explore the world, collect collectibles such as feathers and fish, and attempt numerous challenges found in the game's world. Players are graded according to their performance in these challenges. If the player crashes into a building, the challenge restarts.

The game also features a three-versus-three Capture the Flag-style competitive multiplayer mode. In this mode, two teams of players are tasked to grab a rabbit corpse and carry it back to their nests. Teamwork is emphasized, as players must work cooperatively to fend off their opponents and transport the carcass back to their nest. In this mode, players can attack their opponents using sonic waves, and defend themselves by using a temporal shield that is capable of deflecting attacks, or simply dodge or fly through tight spaces to evade attacks. The game also features the Free Flight mode, which allows players to explore the city with five other players.

== Development ==
I've seen many people try our game, and they'd never played video games before and they're not good with a controller, they don't even know how to hold it, but they were able to play our game and have fun. ... It's intuitive and accessible. I don't need to explain the controls at the beginning, really; I just say 'tilt your head to turn' and you're good to go.

— Olivier Palmieri, project lead of Eagle Flight

The game's development began in October 2014, after team lead Olivier Palmieri completed his work on Far Cry 4, another Ubisoft game. He, along with several other Ubisoft co-workers at Ubisoft Montreal, pitched the game's prototype to Ubisoft's own Fun House division, an idea-pitching platform, at Electronic Entertainment Expo 2015 and Gamescom 2015. The project received enough buzz that it was officially greenlit.

The first prototype was originally named Inside Notre Dame, and tasked players to explore Notre Dame de Paris in first-person. The scale was later expanded to include the whole of Paris. According to Fun House's Patrick Plourde, the team chose Paris as the game's setting as most team members came from the city, and the complex and intricate street layouts of Paris allowed the team to create a more diverse flying experience. The team intentionally avoided using science fiction as they felt it is an overused setting.

According to Palmieri, the main design philosophy behind the game was that it had to be comfortable, intuitive, and accessible. To learn about motion sickness, the team read NASA's documents on stroboscopic treatments, as well as information regarding the vestibulo-ocular reflex. The team later decided to use head movement as the game's primary control. Despite initial concerns that head movement would be a very clumsy way to control the character, they were impressed by its precision after extensive playtesting, with Palmieri saying that the results "went beyond [their] expectations". The team felt that head tracking control was one of the simplest and most accessible ways for non-gamers to enjoy the game, as head movement is inborn and a player would not need to move their arms or learn how to use a traditional controller. In addition, this method of control is the most direct and natural because of its close proximity with the brain.

The team experimented with numerous methods to prevent players from suffering motion sickness while playing the game. They eventually discovered that having the player see the eagle's beak prevented them from feeling nauseous as it is a fixed reference point that allows players to anchor their perspective. The team also investigated causes of motion sickness, and concluded that reduced peripheral vision, by having a dynamic vision-blocking system, can also help solve the problem. To ensure that the brain would not feel queasiness, the team tried to create a consistent experience to ensure that instances of seeing but not feeling motion would not occur. The team programmed the game so the screen fades-to-black instantly if the player collides with other objects.

Inon Zur, who had previously worked on the original soundtracks of Dragon Age: Origins and Fallout 4, served as the game's composer. Zur's soundtrack was described as "soaring and uplifting". In addition to employing an orchestra to perform the music, Zur also included primitive sounds and high-pitch vocal music to further enhance one of the game's themes: the nature of beauty.

The game was officially revealed at Sony Interactive Entertainment's PlayStation Experience 2016 conference. The game was released for the Oculus Rift on October 18, 2016, and for PlayStation VR and HTC Vive on November 8, 2016, and December 20, 2016, respectively. It is the first virtual reality game Ubisoft has released.

== Reception ==
Reception

Aggregate score
Aggregator	Score
Metacritic	(PC) 75/100 (PS4) 72/100

Review scores
Publication	Score
Destructoid	7.5/10
GameSpot	7/10
IGN	7.6/10

Eagle Flight received "favorable" reviews, according to the review aggregator website Metacritic.

Chris Carter of Destructoid praised the game's accessible controls and intense multiplayer mode. He also appreciated the game's simplistic nature, and was pleased that Ubisoft did not turn it into a spin-off of one of their open world games. However, he criticized the city design, which he considered empty and repetitive, and had issues related to Uplay.

Jimmy Thang of GameSpot praised the game's comfortable control scheme and complex multiplayer, but was disappointed by the shallow single-player mode and the general lack of content.

IGN's Brian Albert also praised the intuitive control scheme, particularly praising the game's accessibly. He found the concept of the game "weird" but "well executed", opining that it is a fresh venture into virtual reality. His main concern was the lack of content.

During the 20th Annual D.I.C.E. Awards, the Academy of Interactive Arts & Sciences awarded Eagle Flight with "Immersive Reality Technical Achievement", along with receiving a nomination for "Immersive Reality Game of the Year".
