= Clockwise (disambiguation) =

Clockwise is a motion that proceeds in the same direction as a clock's hands. It may also refer to:

- Clockwise, a puzzle game for the Amiga CD32 games console
- Clockwise (band), a Swedish music project
- Clockwise (film) (1986), starring John Cleese
