= Manual Samuel =

2016 video game

- Steam storefront header
- Developer: Perfectly Paranormal
- Publisher: Curve Digital
- Engine: Unity
- Platforms: Microsoft Windows, OS X, Xbox One, PlayStation 4, Linux
- Release: PlayStation 4: WW: October 11, 2016; Xbox One, Microsoft Windows, OS X: WW: October 14, 2016; Nintendo Switch: WW: August 16, 2018
- Genre: Adventure
- Modes: Single-player, multiplayer

Manual Samuel is an adventure video game developed by Perfectly Paranormal and published by Curve Digital. It was released on PlayStation 4 on October 11, 2016 and on Xbox One and Microsoft Windows on October 14, 2016. The Nintendo Switch version was released on August 16, 2018.

== Gameplay ==
Manual Samuel is a 2D animated adventure sidescroller where players control all of the bodily functions of main protagonist Sam. This ranges from taking individual steps using alternating buttons to move each foot to pressing a key for Sam to blink. The goal of the game is to help Sam make it through the day in this manual fashion.

== Plot ==
Sam Welthenburg Jr., the son of a wealthy CEO, is hit by a septic truck while chasing after his distraught girlfriend. Finding himself in Hell (where all residents must get jobs), Sam makes a deal with the skateboard-loving Death to return to life under the conditions that he must survive 24 hours performing all bodily functions manually.

After a disastrous day at work, Death inadvertently causes the robots of Sam Sr.'s company to come to life. With his job on the line, Death forces Sam to volunteer to control a massive manually controlled robotic suit to help eliminate the robots. Chasing their leader to Mushroom Orphanage, the robot tricks Sam's heat-seeking missiles into firing upon the orphanage, killing 300 innocent orphans and sending their souls to Heaven. Death, trying to escape, is confronted by Satan in Hell.

Angry at the orphans being sent to Heaven (due to their age making them too young to sin), Satan throws Death in Hell's jail and the horseman War is forced to take his place. With Death's deal no longer in play and Sam having technically already died, War kills Sam and returns him to Hell.

Due to having given his Shreds of Life (Hell's most valuable currency) to Death in exchange for his life, Sam is unable to pay the gatekeeper's toll to get a job and gain access to Hell. He is thrown in hell jail alongside Death. Death concocts a plan to help them escape through cutting open a demon guard's body and allowing Sam to control it manually from the inside. After slaughtering several of the hell guards, Sam and Death are confronted by Satan, who engages Sam in a sword fight. While initially losing, Death successfully performs a kickflip for the first time in his existence. This distracts Satan, who has never managed to perform a kickflip himself despite having skated longer than Death, and allows Sam to slash him with a sword.

Satan, upset at his injury, demands Death to send him to a Hell hospital and ignores Sam entirely. With Death no longer in jail, he offers to bring Sam back to life and gives him one final wish of his choosing. Sam wishes that the 300 orphans would come back to life, before returning to earth and reuniting with his girlfriend as a changed man.

During the credits, a series of slides show the aftermath of the game. Sam first has his car fixed and then finally remembers his girlfriend's birthday, buying her three presents to make up for the three birthdays in a row he had forgotten; Death finally lands a kickflip and goes on a date with War; the Four Horsemen get two weeks of paid vacation, while Death and War earn a 55% boost to their salary; Death's actions and kickflip manage to impress Satan; Sam Sr.'s company gets even more money from the publicity of having 300 orphans come back to life in front of it; and the demons Sam killed return to life and hold no hard feelings towards him.

== Development ==
Manual Samuel was created by Perfectly ParaNormal, based in Norway.

== Reception ==
Reception

Aggregate score
Aggregator	Score
Metacritic	PS4: 52/100; XONE: 66/100; NS: 68/100

On Metacritic, the game has "mixed or average" scores for its PlayStation 4, Xbox One, and Nintendo Switch ports.
