= Strike Vector =

2014 video game

- Developer: Ragequit Corporation
- Publisher: Ragequit Corporation
- Programmers: Cedric Lecacheur; Jérémy Chaïeb
- Artists: Paul Chadeisson; Pierre-Etienne Travers
- Composer: The Maravers
- Engine: Unreal
- Platforms: Windows, PlayStation 4
- Release: Windows; January 28, 2014; PlayStation 4 August 30, 2016
- Genres: First-person shooter, third-person shooter
- Mode: Multiplayer

Strike Vector is a first-person shooter video game developed by the French independent studio Ragequit Corporation.

The game is built on the Unreal Development Kit Engine. It was released for Microsoft Windows on January 28, 2014, on Steam. A console port Strike Vector EX was released for PlayStation 4 on August 30, 2016, and also released for Windows on Steam in July 2017.

The game was removed from sale on Steam with the closure of Ragequit Corporation in 2020.

== Gameplay ==
Strike Vector is an arena shooter. The players control the Vector, a highly customizable and manoeuvrable jet fighter. Your can instantly switch between 2 movement modes: Jet Mode (high-speed, for intercepting opponents and evading incoming projectiles) and Stationary Mode (allows strafing in all directions with increased precision).

The game features a third-person view and first-person cockpit view. Strike Vector is centered on multiplayer but also offers a solo game mode called "Challenge mode".

== Reception ==
Reception

Aggregate score
Aggregator	Score
Metacritic	(PC) 73/100

Review scores
Publication	Score
Eurogamer	8/10
GameSpot	7/10
IGN	7.7/10
