= Pharaoh Rebirth =

2016 video game

- Developer: Krobon Station
- Publisher: Degica
- Platform: Windows
- Release: 2016
- Genre: Metroidvania

Pharaoh Rebirth (ファラオリバース) is a 2016 video game for Windows created by independent Japanese game developer Krobon Station.

== Story ==
Pharaoh Rebirth is a metroidvania game starring a bunny named Dr. Jonathan Banfield, set in Egypt.

== Development ==
Krobon says he was inspired by Castlevania: Symphony of the Night, and wished to make a game that appealed to him.

== Gameplay ==
Pharaoh Rebirth is a 2D action exploration game, using pixel art.

Jonathan is a rabbit who attacks with his ears in a stabbing motion. Holding down the attack button makes him spin his ears, to intercept projectiles. Attacking while jumping makes him spin and attack in all directions.

== Release ==
The game was released in May 2015 for the NicoNico Game Magazine, a service which distributes independent games. The game was released as freeware, and several are released each month.

The game was released as Pharaoh Rebirth+ on the video game distribution service Steam on March 17, 2016, and published by Degica. Pharaoh Rebirth+ adds Boss Rush, and a hard mode.

== Reception ==
Destructoid gave it an 8 out of 10.

== See also ==
- Maldita Castilla
