= Clockwork (video game) =

2016 video game

- Developer: Gamesoft
- Producers: Vishal Gumber; Nigel Marshall
- Designers: Adam Pinto; Arianne Elliott; Dan Khoury
- Programmers: Andrew Matthews; Adam Pinto; Greg Matthews; Joel Van De Vorstenbosch; Keen Fong
- Artists: Aaron Bautista; Anitta Smith; Andrew Matthews; Arianne Elliott; Boramy Unn; Nichelle Nolan; Nicole Padilha; Princy Suarez; Jonathon Iskov; Tavish Cotter
- Writer: Daniel McMahon
- Composers: Thilo Schaller; Alex Coe; James Flood; Jonathan Martinez; Lionel Hobden
- Platforms: Windows; OS X
- Release: Windows: WW: October 10, 2016; Mac OS: WW: October 28, 2016
- Genre: Puzzle-platform
- Mode: Single-player

Clockwork is a puzzle-platform game developed and published by Sydney, Australia based video game studio Gamesoft. The game has a steampunk theme and is set in a city in a dystopian future.

== Plot ==
Clockwork is set in the dystopian future city of Watchtower; As Atto you try to get by day to day, until he discovers his watch is inhabited by the spirit of a girl known as Milli. Atto decided to return Milli to her creator, and the two need to work together to get through the dangerous obstacles of Clocktower with Milli's mysterious power to reverse time.

== Development ==
Gamesoft, a video game studio based in Parramatta, Sydney, Australia, began development of Clockwork in 2014. Vishal Gumber, the CEO of Gamesoft, said the game took two years to finish with a team of twenty five people.

== Reception ==
Reviews for the game largely praise the art and soundtrack for being beautiful and bringing the steampunk work of Clocktower to life. However, bugs in the gameplay and some confused game design in the latter part of the game have caused mixed reviews on Steam.
