= Imscared =

2016 video game

IMSCARED
- Developer: Ivan Zanotti
- Publisher: Ivan Zanotti's MyMadnessWorks
- Director: Ivan Zanotti
- Programmers: Ivan Zanotti; Tizzio
- Writer: Ivan Zanotti
- Composer: Ivan Zanotti
- Engine: Game Maker
- Platforms: Microsoft Windows; Android
- Release: October 12, 2012 (original); January 31, 2016 (Steam Edition); October 15, 2024 (Android Port)
- Genres: Horror; Adventure
- Mode: Single-player

Imscared (stylized as IMSCARED) is an independent meta-horror game, with pixelated graphics, created by Italian developer Ivan Zanotti. In the game, the player explores dark environments, solving puzzles, while being stalked by an entity known as White Face, a being capable of manipulating the player's computer.

It was initially released as freeware in 2012, with the title Imscared – A Pixelated Nightmare. On January 31, 2016, a full commercial version was released on Steam, with new content and longer gameplay.

On October 12, 2022, in celebration of the original game's tenth anniversary, Zanotti released the 2022 update. It was meant as a revision, a "mix" of the 2012 version and the 2016 version, alongside new content, a higher frame rate and other changes.

On October 15, 2024, the game was ported to Android. According to Zanotti, it was essentially the same as the desktop version, except the file-system interactions were replaced with other events in order to comply with Google Play's guidelines.

== Gameplay ==
Imscared is a first-person exploration game with horror elements. The player uses simple commands to walk around the environments, which include small rooms and narrow corridors. In order to progress, they have to look for certain items (often keys), solve puzzles and uncover hidden paths.

The game's primary threat is an entity known as White Face. Over the course of the game, it can appear multiple times and cause apparent game crashes when it makes contact with the player character. Similar to White Face, HER also pursues the player.

Following the theme of meta-horror, the game often interacts with the player's computer (if they are playing on Windows). These moments include creating real files, as well as suddenly opening browser tabs. To progress, the player frequently has to engage with these meta elements in some way, such as by deleting files.

Imscared makes use of certain phrases that give access to different areas.

== Plot ==
=== 2012 freeware version ===
It starts off with a small tutorial, including the remark that "The game will try to deceive you as many times as it can". The initial goal is exiting a room, which requires a heart. Upon acquiring it, the player is met by a strange floating face and the game apparently crashes.

=== 2022 revision ===
The initial section is kept, from searching for a heart to getting a crash after meeting White Face. The player enters the entity's name when asked and starts being chased by it. After escaping, the player is able to go back to the first room and exit the door. The game seemingly ends. After rebooting the game, the player walks around a bright place with many doors. After solving a puzzle, they are greeted with another apparent ending.

After another reboot, the player is asked for a second name: HER. As the player walks across a parlor, solving puzzles and opening doors, they are frequently chased by HER. At some point, after a reboot, the player is sent to a labyrinth and has to enter a secret passage where there will be more puzzles. They return to the basement, and then move to a train station where HER is present. This portion of the game ends with the player using a revolver to fight against HER.

The game asks for a third name: "Ivan Zanotti" (the creator). The player appears in a supermarket, and needs to solve more puzzles. The fourth and final phrase requested is "TAKE ME TO THE DOOR". The player emerges in a room where they must fix a pipe in order to open a door. White Face becomes a threat again at this point of the game.

At the end of the game, the player is faced with a simple choice. If they give White Face a flower, the game restarts from the very beginning. If they leave, they will go back to the starting room. A file called "heart.txt" is created in the imscared folder on the player's desktop and deleting it is required to defeat White Face and complete the game. After this, the entirety of the game world becomes accessible and the true ending is achieved.

Post-endgame, the player can encounter the Restorer, a jolly-looking young woman in a pantsuit, who introduces them to future plans for the game.

== Development and release ==
Zanotti expressed interest in raising money for a new Imscared experience on October 2, 2013. His Indiegogo crowdfunding campaign was meant to allow a version with new areas, fourth-wall breaking events and Oculus Rift support. On December 17, 2013, he claimed the campaign had "failed a bit", but that the money obtained would be saved for the future.

On January 31, 2016, a commercial version of Imscared was released on Steam, keeping the original idea while adding more content.

On October 12, 2022, Zanotti announced and released a new version of Imscared, calling it a remaster of the original game. According to him, it was made with the latest Game Maker version at the time. Several changes were listed, including an Options menu, Steam cards and graphic improvements. The developer described the 2022 edition as "picking the best" from the original 2012 version and the 2016 version.

On October 15, 2024, a mobile version of the game was released for Android devices. According to Zanotti, he needed to replace the file system mechanics with different content due to Google Play guidelines. Nevertheless, he called it fundamentally the same experience as the desktop version.

== Reception ==
The game received positive reviews from critics, who praised its old-fashioned graphics and sound design, as well as meta-horror elements.

Rock Paper Shotgun pointed out how the game uses its atmosphere and creativity to scare the player. In 2012, PC Gamer praised the 2012 release for the psychological horror and its "devious tricks up its sleeve". In 2014, Polygon praised the 2012 release for its puzzles, and for being terrifying throughout. In 2016, Zack Furniss, from Destructoid, called the 2012 freeware version of Imscared one of his favorite horror games and wrote that the experience was "more impactful if you go into it blind". In 2022, IGN rated the game's 2016 release one of the twelve best horror games for PC.

By 2013, the original Imscared was considered by Indie Statik an "indie horror classic". The publication praised both the way it would break the fourth wall and its unabashed use of low-res graphics. It set a precedent for future games of a similar nature.
