= Infamous =

Infamous may refer to:

== Arts, entertainment and media ==
=== Film and television ===
- Infamous (2006 film), an American drama film
- Infamous (2020 film), an American crime thriller film
- "Infamous", an episode of Lego Ninjago: Masters of Spinjitzu

=== Gaming ===
- Infamous (series), a series of video games
  - Infamous (video game)
  - Infamous 2
  - Infamous: Festival of Blood
  - Infamous Second Son
  - Infamous First Light
- Infamous, a stage show and DVD by Derren Brown
- Infamous Gaming, a professional esports organization based in Lima, Peru

=== Literature ===
- Infamous (comics), a comic book by DC Comics
- Infamous (novel), in The It Girl series, 2008

=== Music ===
- Infamous (Abandon All Ships album), 2012
- Infamous (Motionless in White album), 2012
- The Infamous, a 1995 album by Mobb Deep
- The Infamous Mobb Deep, a 2014 studio album by Mobb Deep

== People ==
- Infamous (producer), Marco Rodriguez-Diaz, an American record producer DJ
- Lord Infamous, Ricky T Dunigan (1973–2013), an American rapper

== See also ==
- Infamy (disambiguation)
- Infamous Mobb, an American hip hop group
- Infamous Syndicate, an American hip hop duo
