= D.I.C.E. Award for Outstanding Achievement in Character =

Annual award presented by the Academy of Interactive Arts & Sciences

- Country: United States
- Presented by: Academy of Interactive Arts & Sciences
- First award: 2004
- Currently held by: Atsu (Ghost of Yōtei)
- Website: interactive.org

The D.I.C.E. Award for Outstanding Achievement in Character is an award presented annually by the Academy of Interactive Arts & Sciences during the D.I.C.E. Awards. This award is "presented to the individual or team whose work has furthered the interactive experience through the creation of a memorable character within an interactive title. Outstanding character takes into consideration the marriage of voice acting and performance (motion capture work), character design and execution, and writing". All creative/technical members of the Academy are qualified to vote in this category, regardless of their field of expertise. There were originally separate awards for female and male characters, but eventually merged into one category at the 11th Annual Interactive Achievement Awards in 2008.

The award's most recent winner is for Atsu (portrayed by Erika Ishii, directed by Nate Fox, and written by Ian Ryan) from Ghost of Yōtei, developed by Sucker Punch Productions and published by Sony Interactive Entertainment.

== History ==
There used to be separate awards presented for a female character performance and a male character performance. Over the years it would go back and forth between Outstanding Achievement in Character Performance and Outstanding Character Performance, before being simplified to just Outstanding Achievement in Character in 2015.

- Outstanding Achievement in Character Performance - Female (2004, 2007)
- Outstanding Achievement in Character Performance - Male (2004, 2007)
- Outstanding Character Performance - Female (2005–2006)
- Outstanding Character Performance - Male (2005–2006)
- Outstanding Character Performance (2008–2009, 2011, 2014)
- Outstanding Achievement in Character Performance (2010, 2012)
- Outstanding Character Performance - Male or Female (2013)
- Outstanding Achievement in Character (2015–present)

== Winners and nominees ==
Table key
Indicates the winner

=== 2000s ===
Year	Game, Actor/Actress, Role	Developer(s)	Publisher(s)	Ref.
2003 (Note: Separate awards presented for female and male characters.) (7th)	Outstanding Achievement in Character Performance - Female (Note: Tie between finalists.)			
2003 (7th)	Jada Pinkett Smith as Niobe (Enter the Matrix)	Shiny Entertainment	Atari	
2003 (7th)	Tara Strong as Rikku (Final Fantasy X-2)	SquareSoft	Square Enix	
2003 (7th)	Christina Milian as Angel (Def Jam Vendetta)	AKI Corporation, EA Canada	Electronic Arts	
2003 (7th)	Anna Garduño as Keira (Jak II)	Naughty Dog	Sony Computer Entertainment	
2003 (7th)	Anna Edwards as Yasmin (The Getaway)	Team Soho	Sony Computer Entertainment	
2003 (7th)	Outstanding Achievement in Character Performance - Male			
2003 (7th)	Elijah Wood as Frodo Baggins (The Lord of the Rings: The Return of the King)	EA Redwood Shores	Electronic Arts	
2003 (7th)	Method Man (Def Jam Vendetta)	AKI Corporation, EA Canada	Electronic Arts	
2003 (7th)	James McCaffrey as Max Payne (Max Payne 2: The Fall of Max Payne)	Remedy Entertainment	Rockstar Games	
2003 (7th)	Michael Ironside as Sam Fisher (Tom Clancy's Splinter Cell)	Ubisoft Montreal	Ubisoft	
2003 (7th)	Snoop Dogg (True Crime: Streets of LA)	Luxoflux	Activision	
2004 (8th)	Outstanding Character Performance - Female			
2004 (8th)	Judi Dench as M (GoldenEye: Rogue Agent)	EA Los Angeles	Electronic Arts	
2004 (8th)	Vanessa Marshall as Zhai (Forgotten Realms: Demon Stone)	Stormfront Studios	Atari	
2004 (8th)	Linda Currie (Zoo Tycoon 2)	Blue Fang Games	Microsoft Game Studios	
2004 (8th)	Outstanding Character Performance - Male			
2004 (8th)	Robert Guillaume as Dr. Eli Vance (Half-Life 2)	Valve	Vivendi Universal Games	
2004 (8th)	Daniel Riordan as Rannek (Forgotten Realms: Demon Stone)	Stormfront Studios	Atari	
2004 (8th)	David Hayter as Naked Snake (Metal Gear Solid 3: Snake Eater)	Konami	Konami	
2004 (8th)	Cary Elwes as The Bard (The Bard's Tale)	inXile Entertainment	inXile Entertainment	
2004 (8th)	Vin Diesel as Riddick (The Chronicles of Riddick: Escape from Butcher Bay)	Starbreeze Studios	Vivendi Universal Games	
2005 (9th)	Outstanding Character Performance - Female			
2005 (9th)	Jade Empire (Note: Kim Mai Guest as Dawn Star)	BioWare	Microsoft Game Studios	
2005 (9th)	Gun	Neversoft	Activision	
2005 (9th)	Need for Speed: Most Wanted	EA Canada, EA Black Box	Electronic Arts	
2005 (9th)	Prince of Persia: The Two Thrones	Ubisoft Montreal, Ubisoft Casablanca	Ubisoft	
2005 (9th)	Outstanding Character Performance - Male			
2005 (9th)	God of War	Santa Monica Studio	Sony Computer Entertainment	
2005 (9th)	Gun	Neversoft	Activision	
2005 (9th)	Jade Empire	BioWare	Microsoft Game Studios	
2005 (9th)	Oddworld: Stranger's Wrath	Oddworld Inhabitants	Electronic Arts	
2005 (9th)	Tom Clancy's Splinter Cell: Chaos Theory	Ubisoft Montreal, Ubisoft Milan	Ubisoft	
2006 (10th)	Outstanding Achievement in Character Performance - Female			
2006 (10th)	Louise Ridgeway as Leafos (Viva Piñata)	Rare	Microsoft Game Studios	
2006 (10th)	Maine Anders as Christy Martin (Bully)	Rockstar Vancouver	Rockstar Games	
2006 (10th)	Brenda Strong as Mary Alice Young (Desperate Housewives: The Game)	Liquid Entertainment	Buena Vista Games	
2006 (10th)	Tia Carrere as Lin (Saints Row)	Volition	THQ	
2006 (10th)	Lynda Carter (Note: Voice female nords and female orcs.) (The Elder Scrolls IV: Oblivion)	Bethesda Game Studios	Bethesda Softworks, 2K Games	
2006 (10th)	Outstanding Achievement in Character Performance - Male			
2006 (10th)	John DiMaggio as Marcus Fenix (Gears of War)	Epic Games	Microsoft Game Studios	
2006 (10th)	Gerry Rosenthal as Jimmy Hopkins (Bully)	Rockstar Vancouver	Rockstar Games	
2006 (10th)	Max Casella as Daxter (Daxter)	Ready at Dawn	Sony Computer Entertainment	
2006 (10th)	Lego Han Solo (Note: Voiced actor not specified. Character name listed under the voice actor credit.) (Lego Star Wars II: The Original Trilogy)	Traveller's Tales	LucasArts	
2006 (10th)	Michael Ironside as Sam Fisher (Tom Clancy's Splinter Cell: Double Agent)	Ubisoft Shanghai	Ubisoft	
2007 (11th)	Portal (Note: Ellen McLain as GLaDOS)	Valve	Valve, Electronic Arts	
2007 (11th)	BioShock	2K Boston, 2K Australia	2K Games	
2007 (11th)	Heavenly Sword	Ninja Theory	Sony Computer Entertainment	
2007 (11th)	Mass Effect	BioWare	Microsoft Game Studios	
2007 (11th)	Uncharted: Drake's Fortune	Naughty Dog	Sony Computer Entertainment	
2008 (12th)	Sackboy (LittleBigPlanet)	Media Molecule	Sony Computer Entertainment	
2008 (12th)	Dom Santiago (Gears of War 2)	Epic Games	Microsoft Game Studios	
2008 (12th)	Marcus Fenix (Gears of War 2)	Epic Games	Microsoft Game Studios	
2008 (12th)	Old Snake (Metal Gear Solid 4: Guns of the Patriots)	Kojima Productions	Konami	
2008 (12th)	Lara Croft (Tomb Raider: Underworld)	Crystal Dynamics	Eidos Interactive	
2009 (13th)	Mark Hamill as The Joker (Batman: Arkham Asylum)	Rocksteady Studios	Warner Bros. Interactive Entertainment	
2009 (13th)	Jack Black as Eddie Riggs (Brütal Legend)	Double Fine Productions	Electronic Arts	
2009 (13th)	Karen Dyer as Sheva Alomar (Resident Evil 5)	Capcom	Capcom	
2009 (13th)	Claudia Black as Chloe Frazer (Uncharted 2: Among Thieves)	Naughty Dog	Sony Computer Entertainment	
2009 (13th)	Nolan North as Nathan Drake (Uncharted 2: Among Thieves)	Naughty Dog	Sony Computer Entertainment	

=== 2010s ===
Year	Game	Developer(s)	Publisher(s)	Ref.
2010 (14th)	Rob Wiethoff as John Marston (Red Dead Redemption)	Rockstar San Diego	Rockstar Games	
2010 (14th)	Andy Serkis as Monkey (Enslaved: Odyssey to the West)	Ninja Theory	Namco Bandai Games	
2010 (14th)	Terrence C. Carson as Kratos (God of War III)	Santa Monica Studio	Sony Computer Entertainment	
2010 (14th)	Mark Meer as Male Commander Shepard (Mass Effect 2)	BioWare	Electronic Arts	
2010 (14th)	Neil Kaplan as Tychus Findlay (StarCraft II: Wings of Liberty)	Blizzard Entertainment	Blizzard Entertainment	
2011 (15th)	Wheatley (Portal 2)	Valve	Valve	
2011 (15th)	Adam Jensen (Deus Ex: Human Revolution)	Eidos-Montréal	Square Enix Europe	
2011 (15th)	Cole Phelps (L.A. Noire)	Team Bondi	Rockstar Games	
2011 (15th)	Nathan Drake (Uncharted 3: Drake's Deception)	Naughty Dog	Sony Computer Entertainment	
2011 (15th)	Victor Sullivan (Uncharted 3: Drake's Deception)	Naughty Dog	Sony Computer Entertainment	
2012 (16th)	Lee Everett (The Walking Dead)	Telltale Games	Telltale Games	
2012 (16th)	Tiny Tina (Borderlands 2)	Gearbox Software	2K Games	
2012 (16th)	Vaas Montenegro (Far Cry 3)	Ubisoft Montreal	Ubisoft	
2012 (16th)	Cortana (Halo 4)	343 Industries	Microsoft Studios	
2012 (16th)	Female Commander Shepard (Mass Effect 3)	BioWare	Electronic Arts	
2013 (17th)	Ellie (The Last of Us)	Naughty Dog	Sony Computer Entertainment	
2013 (17th)	Trevor Philips (Grand Theft Auto V)	Rockstar North	Rockstar Games	
2013 (17th)	Marius Titus (Ryse: Son of Rome)	Paradox Development Studios	Paradox Interactive	
2013 (17th)	Joel (The Last of Us)	Naughty Dog	Sony Computer Entertainment	
2013 (17th)	Narrator (The Stanley Parable)	Galactic Café	Galactic Café	
2014 (18th)	Talion (Middle-earth: Shadow of Mordor)	Monolith Productions	Warner Bros. Interactive Entertainment	
2014 (18th)	Jonathan Irons (Call of Duty: Advanced Warfare)	Sledgehammer Games	Activision	
2014 (18th)	Pagan Min (Far Cry 4)	Ubisoft Montreal	Ubisoft	
2014 (18th)	Abigail "Fetch" Walker (Infamous First Light)	Sucker Punch Productions	Sony Computer Entertainment	
2014 (18th)	Deslin Rowe (Infamous Second Son)	Sucker Punch Productions	Sony Computer Entertainment	
2015 (19th)	Lara Croft (Rise of the Tomb Raider)	Crystal Dynamics	Square Enix Europe	
2015 (19th)	Evie Frye (Assassin's Creed Syndicate)	Ubisoft Quebec	Ubisoft	
2015 (19th)	Hannah Smith (Her Story)	Sam Barlow	Sam Barlow	
2015 (19th)	Max Caulfield (Life Is Strange)	Don't Nod	Square Enix Europe	
2015 (19th)	Geralt of Rivia (The Witcher 3: Wild Hunt)	CD Projekt Red	CD Projekt	
2016 (20th)	Trico (The Last Guardian)	Japan Studio, GenDesign	Sony Interactive Entertainment	
2016 (20th)	Nick Reyes (Call of Duty: Infinite Warfare)	Infinity Ward	Activision	
2016 (20th)	Delilah (Firewatch)	Campo Santo	Campo Santo	
2016 (20th)	Henry (Firewatch)	Campo Santo	Campo Santo	
2016 (20th)	Nathan Drake (Uncharted 4: A Thief's End)	Naughty Dog	Sony Interactive Entertainment	
2017 (21st)	Senua (Hellblade: Senua's Sacrifice)	Ninja Theory	Ninja Theory	
2017 (21st)	Bayek (Assassin's Creed Origins)	Ubisoft Montreal	Ubisoft	
2017 (21st)	Aloy (Horizon Zero Dawn)	Guerrilla Games	Sony Interactive Entertainment	
2017 (21st)	Iden Versio (Star Wars Battlefront II)	DICE, Motive Studios, Criterion Games	Electronic Arts	
2017 (21st)	Chloe Frazer (Uncharted: The Lost Legacy)	Naughty Dog	Sony Interactive Entertainment	
2018 (22nd)	Kratos (God of War)	Santa Monica Studio	Sony Interactive Entertainment	
2018 (22nd)	Kassandra (Assassin's Creed Odyssey)	Ubisoft Quebec	Ubisoft	
2018 (22nd)	Atreus (God of War)	Santa Monica Studio	Sony Interactive Entertainment	
2018 (22nd)	Peter Parker/Spider-Man (Marvel's Spider-Man)	Insomniac Games	Sony Interactive Entertainment	
2018 (22nd)	Arthur Morgan (Red Dead Redemption 2)	Rockstar Games	Rockstar Games	
2019 (23rd)	The Goose (Untitled Goose Game)	House House	Panic Inc.	
2019 (23rd)	Jesse Faden (Control)	Remedy Entertainment	505 Games	
2019 (23rd)	Cliff Unger (Death Stranding)	Kojima Productions	Sony Interactive Entertainment	
2019 (23rd)	Sam Porter Bridges (Death Stranding)	Kojima Productions	Sony Interactive Entertainment	
2019 (23rd)	Greez (Star Wars Jedi: Fallen Order)	Respawn Entertainment	Electronic Arts	

=== 2020s ===
Year	Game	Developer(s)	Publisher(s)	Ref.
2020 (24th)	Miles Morales (Marvel's Spider-Man: Miles Morales)	Insomniac Games	Sony Interactive Entertainment	
2020 (24th)	Eivor Varinsdottir (Assassin's Creed Valhalla)	Ubisoft Montreal	Ubisoft	
2020 (24th)	Zagreus (Hades)	Supergiant Games	Supergiant Games	
2020 (24th)	Abby (The Last of Us Part II)	Naughty Dog	Sony Computer Entertainment	
2020 (24th)	Ellie (The Last of Us Part II)	Naughty Dog	Sony Computer Entertainment	
2021 (25th)	Lady Dimitrescu (Resident Evil Village)	Capcom	Capcom	
2021 (25th)	Colt Vahn (Deathloop)	Arkane Studios	Bethesda Softworks	
2021 (25th)	Kena (Kena: Bridge of Spirits)	Ember Lab	Ember Lab	
2021 (25th)	Alex Chen (Life Is Strange: True Colors)	Deck Nine	Square Enix Europe	
2021 (25th)	Rivet (Ratchet & Clank: Rift Apart)	Insomniac Games	Sony Interactive Entertainment	
2022 (26th)	Kratos (God of War Ragnarök)	Santa Monica Studio	Sony Interactive Entertainment	
2022 (26th)	Alejandro Vargas (Call of Duty: Modern Warfare II)	Infinity Ward	Activision	
2022 (26th)	Atreus (God of War Ragnarök)	Santa Monica Studio	Sony Interactive Entertainment	
2022 (26th)	Aloy (Horizon Forbidden West)	Guerrilla Games	Sony Interactive Entertainment	
2022 (26th)	Guybrush Threepwood (Return to Monkey Island)	Terrible Toybox	Devolver Digital	
2023 (27th)	Miles Morales (Marvel's Spider-Man 2)	Insomniac Games	Sony Interactive Entertainment	
2023 (27th)	Saga Anderson (Alan Wake 2)	Remedy Entertainment	Epic Games	
2023 (27th)	Astarion (Baldur's Gate 3)	Larian Studios	Larian Studios	
2023 (27th)	Karlach (Baldur's Gate 3)	Larian Studios	Larian Studios	
2023 (27th)	Jala (Thirsty Suitors)	Outerloop Games	Annapurna Interactive	
2024 (28th)	Dr. Henry "Indiana" Jones (Indiana Jones and the Great Circle)	MachineGames	Bethesda Softworks	
2024 (28th)	Watcher (1000xResist)	Sunset Visitor	Fellow Traveller Games	
2024 (28th)	Yuffie Kisaragi (Final Fantasy VII Rebirth)	Square Enix	Square Enix	
2024 (28th)	Indika (Indika)	Odd-Meter	11 Bit Studios	
2024 (28th)	Senua (Senua's Saga: Hellblade II)	Ninja Theory	Xbox Game Studios	
2025 (29th)	Atsu (Ghost of Yōtei)	Sucker Punch Productions	Sony Interactive Entertainment	
2025 (29th)	Esquie (Clair Obscur: Expedition 33)	Sandfall Interactive	Kepler Interactive	
2025 (29th)	Maelle (Clair Obscur: Expedition 33)	Sandfall Interactive	Kepler Interactive	
2025 (29th)	Courtney/Invisigal (Dispatch)	AdHoc Studio	AdHoc Studio	
2025 (29th)	Robert Robertson III/Mecha Man (Dispatch)	AdHoc Studio	AdHoc Studio	

== Multiple nominations and wins ==
=== Developers and publishers ===
Sony has published the most nominees and the most winners. Sony's subsidiary Naughty Dog has developed the most nominees. Valve and Sony's Santa Monica Studio are tied for developing the most winners. Electronic Arts and Microsoft Game Studios are the only publishers with back-to-back wins. Electronic Arts has published back-to-back winners for a Male Character in 2004 and 2005, while Microsoft has published back-to-back winners for a Female Character in 2006 and 2007. Electronic Arts and Microsoft have published both winners for a Female Character and a Male Character in 2005 and 2007, respectively. Ubisoft has published the most nominees without publishing a single winner, and its subsidiary Ubisoft Montreal has developed the most nominees without developing a single winner.

Developers
Developer	Nominations	Wins
Santa Monica Studio	5	3
Valve	3	3
Insomniac Games	4	2
Naughty Dog	12	1
BioWare	5	1
Ninja Theory	4	1
Epic Games	3	1
Sucker Punch Productions	3	1
Capcom	2	1
Crystal Dynamics	2	1
SquareSoft/Square Enix	2	1
Ubisoft Montreal	7	0
EA Canada	3	0
Kojima Productions	3	0
Remedy Entertainment	3	0
AdHoc Studio	2	0
AKI Corporation	2	0
Campo Santo	2	0
Guerrilla Games	2	0
Infinity Ward	2	0
Larian Studios	2	0
Neversoft	2	0
Rockstar Vancouver	2	0
Sandfall Interactive	2	0
Stormfront Studios	2	0
Ubisoft Quebec	2	0

Publishers
Publisher	Nominations	Wins
Sony Computer/Interactive Entertainment	33	9
Electronic Arts	13	3
Microsoft/Xbox Game Studios	10	3
Valve	3	3
Warner Bros. Interactive Entertainment	2	2
Rockstar Games	7	1
Eidos Interactive/Square Enix Europe	5	1
Bethesda Softworks	3	1
Capcom	2	1
Square Enix	2	1
Ubisoft	10	0
Activision	6	0
2K Games	3	0
Atari	3	0
AdHoc Studio	2	0
Campo Santo	2	0
Kepler Interactive	2	0
Konami	2	0
Larian Studios	2	0

=== Franchises and Characters ===
Uncharted has received the most nominations in this category, but has never won. God of War, Marvel's Spider-Man, and Portal are the only franchises to have won more than once, with God of War being the most award-winning franchise. There have been numerous games that have two finalists in the same year:

- Def Jam Vendetta (2004)
- Forgotten Realms: Demon Stone (2005)
- Gun (2006)
- Jade Empire (2006)
- Bully (2007)
- Gears of War 2 (2009)
- Uncharted 2: Among Thieves (2010)
- Uncharted 3: Drake's Deception (2012)
- The Last of Us (2014)
- Firewatch (2017)
- God of War (2019)
- Death Stranding (2020)
- The Last of Us Part II (2021)
- God of War Ragnarök (2023)
- Baldur's Gate 3 (2024)
- Clair Obscur: Expedition 33 (2026)
- Dispatch (2026)

Uncharted, The Last of Us, and God of War are the only franchises to have multiple nominated characters within a single game more than once. Infamous is the only franchise to receive nominations for more than one game in a single year. Portal is the only franchise that has won with more than one character (GLaDOS and Wheatley). God of War is the only franchise with the same pair of characters nominated concurrently in multiple games (Kratos and Atreus).

Kratos and Nathan Drake are the most nominated characters in this category. Kratos and Miles Morales are the only characters with more than one win. Commander Shepard is the only character that have both the male and female versions named as a finalist.

Franchises
Franchise	Nominations	Wins
God of War	6	3
Marvel's Spider-Man	3	2
Portal	2	2
The Last of Us	4	1
Gears of War	3	1
Final Fantasy	2	1
Hellblade	2	1
Red Dead	2	1
Resident Evil	2	1
Tomb Raider	2	1
Uncharted	7	0
Assassin's Creed	4	0
Call of Duty	3	0
Mass Effect	3	0
Star Wars	3	0
Tom Clancy's Splinter Cell	3	0
Baldur's Gate	2	0
Clair Obscur	2	0
Def Jam	2	0
Death Stranding	2	0
Dispatch	2	0
Far Cry	2	0
Firewatch	2	0
Forgotten Realms	2	0
Horizon	2	0
Infamous	2	0
Jak & Daxter	2	0
Life Is Strange	2	0
Metal Gear	2	0

Characters (Note: This does not include finalists from 2006 nor 2008.)
Character	Nominations	Wins
Kratos	3	2
Miles Morales	2	2
Ellie	2	1
Lara Croft	2	1
Marcus Fenix	2	1
Senua	2	1
Nathan Drake	3	0
Aloy	2	0
Atreus	2	0
Chloe Frazer	2	0
Commander Shepard	2	0
Sam Fisher	2	0
