= Infamous Second Son =

2014 video game

- Developer: Sucker Punch Productions
- Publisher: Sony Computer Entertainment
- Director: Nate Fox
- Producer: Brian Fleming
- Designer: Jaime Griesemer
- Composers: Brain and Melissa; Nathan Johnson; Marc Canham
- Series: Infamous
- Platform: PlayStation 4
- Release: March 21, 2014
- Genre: Action-adventure
- Mode: Single-player

Infamous Second Son (Note: Stylized as inFAMOUS Second Son) is a 2014 action-adventure video game developed by Sucker Punch Productions and published by Sony Computer Entertainment for the PlayStation 4. The third installment in the Infamous series, it serves as a standalone sequel to 2011's Infamous 2. The player-controlled protagonist possesses superpower abilities that players use in combat and when traveling across the city. The story follows protagonist Delsin Rowe fighting the Department of Unified Protection (D.U.P.) in a fictionalized Seattle. Over the course of the game, Delsin acquires new powers and becomes either good or evil as player choices influence his morality.

Sucker Punch began developing Infamous Second Son as early as 2011, when it began discussions with Sony on bringing the Infamous series to a new generation of hardware. The developer provided feedback to Sony on what hardware evolutions it would like to see on PlayStation 4. Sucker Punch considers Second Son a "fresh start" for the series because it features a new protagonist. Delsin's powers were designed to feel fluid and suited to the open world design.

Infamous Second Son received positive reviews from critics, who praised its gameplay, combat, visuals and design, while criticism was aimed at the morality system, which some found to be dated and binary, as well as the repetitive side missions. The story was met with a mixed response, with some critics finding the narrative and characters to be a step backwards from previous installments in the series, while others viewed the writing as an improvement over its predecessors. The game sold over a million units within nine days of its release and six million units by June 2019, making it the fastest-selling entry of the Infamous series and one of the best-selling PlayStation 4 games.

== Gameplay ==
Delsin may use his superpowers to subdue enemies rather than killing them. Players make choices like these, with Delsin's karma level consequently rising as either good or evil.

Infamous Second Son is an action-adventure game set in an open world environment and played from a third-person perspective. Players control the main character Delsin Rowe, who can parkour-style climb vertical surfaces like high-rise buildings. Delsin is a Conduit, which allows him to use superpowers by manipulating materials such as smoke, neon, video, and concrete. These materials can be weaponized (such that Delsin can perform melee attacks or fire projectiles from his fingertips) or used to deftly navigate the game world (such as using neon to dash up buildings). Using powers depletes a meter in the head-up display (HUD), which can be replenished by drawing from power sources such as smoke from exploded vehicles. Delsin earns new powers as he progresses through the story, which sees him fight against the Department of Unified Protection (D.U.P.) during missions. Each time Delsin gains a new power set he must destroy D.U.P. Core Relays to learn the basic abilities that correspond to it. Delsin upgrades and acquires new abilities by spending Blast Shards that have been collected, they are scattered throughout Seattle. Players become more powerful in combat by expanding Delsin's suite of abilities.

Players may choose to act in either a good or evil way. Examples including healing civilians, doing drug busts, and stopping suspect brutality for good, or killing innocent civilians and killing instead of apprehending enemies. Several times throughout the story, Delsin finds himself in a scenario where he must make a good or evil choice, such as whether to encourage Conduit vigilante Abigail "Fetch" Walker to stop slaying drug dealers, or to train her to become a more prolific killer. Player choices influence outcomes in some later missions. In combat, Delsin may use his abilities to incapacitate foes or obliterate them with headshots. He may choose to open fire on innocent civilians. Delsin's choices manifest in a logo displayed on his jacket and the HUD, which features a blue (good) and red (evil) bird. Performing actions that are villainous gradually change the logo so that the red bird dominates the other, with the opposite happening with heroism. This is a visual representation of Delsin's Karma level, that increases as good or evil depending on his choices. As his Karma level increases, Delsin can acquire new powers that correspond to his play-style (e.g. very destructive powers with high levels of evil Karma) and his jacket also changes. If you have good karma, the jacket completely changes to white whereas if evil the jacket turns red. A continual streak of either good or evil actions fills up a bar in the HUD, which then lets Delsin perform a powerful finishing move called a Karma Bomb.

When not completing story missions, players can explore the city and complete activities such as tagging graffiti spots or killing D.U.P. secret agents. The city is split into districts that are all initially controlled by the D.U.P., but Delsin gradually liberates each district by completing activities. When D.U.P. control of a district falls below 30 percent, Delsin can enter a District Showdown that requires him to eliminate a wave of D.U.P. forces, eradicating D.U.P. presence there.

== Plot ==
=== Setting ===
Second Son takes place seven years after the end of Infamous 2, specifically the canonical "Good Ending". In that ending, Conduit protagonist Cole MacGrath sacrificed himself to cure humanity of a plague and destroy the Beast, inadvertently killing a majority of the world's Conduits while awakening the powers of some others. The U.S. government, recognizing the possibility that a Conduit could use their powers to overthrow the global establishment, establishes the D.U.P. (Department of Unified Protection) to hunt down and capture the remaining Conduits, while also spreading propaganda labeling them as "Bioterrorists".

As opposed to the previous two games, Second Son takes place in the real-life city of Seattle, Washington and uses many actual locations and neighborhoods.

=== Characters ===
The protagonist is Delsin Rowe (Troy Baker), a 24-year-old graffiti artist and local delinquent of the Akomish reservation. Delsin has the unique Conduit ability of Power Absorption, allowing him to absorb and copy the powers of any Conduit he comes into contact with. His brother, Reggie (Travis Willingham), is the local sheriff, and often arrests Delsin for his acts of vandalism. Both are Akomish Native Americans, whose territory lies at the shore of Salmon Bay, Washington. The antagonist is Brooke Augustine (Christine Dunford), the director of the D.U.P. and a Conduit with power over concrete. Her actions in the Akomish reservation drive Delsin to travel to Seattle, now under lockdown by D.U.P. forces. Delsin and Reggie encounter three other Conduits: Henry "Hank" Daughtry (David Stanbra), a convict with control over smoke; Abigail "Fetch" Walker (Laura Bailey), an ex-junkie who uses her neon powers to hunt down illegal drug dealers in Seattle; and Eugene Sims (Alex Walsh), a reclusive video game addict who uses his video (digital materialization) powers to save suspected Conduits from the D.U.P.

=== Story ===
Reggie catches Delsin vandalizing a billboard in their Salmon Bay hometown, but their subsequent argument is interrupted when a military truck carrying three Conduit prisoners crashes on the Akomish reservation. Two of the Conduits escape, but Delsin manages to pull the third one, Hank, out of the wreckage, inadvertently absorbing his smoke powers in the process. Shocked and frightened, Delsin pursues Hank to figure out what has happened and how to control his new powers. However, they are both cornered by Brooke Augustine. She encases Hank in concrete and questions Delsin, suspecting him of hiding something. Delsin can choose to either tell Augustine the truth about his powers or say nothing. Regardless of Delsin's choice, Augustine knocks him out before moving on to the other tribe members.

Delsin awakens a week later and discovers that Augustine has brutally tortured the rest of the tribe in an unsuccessful bid to gain information. However, she has left them to gradually die from concrete shards fused into their bodies, including their leader Betty (Karen Austin). Reggie, who was spared from the torture, learns that the only way to remove the shards is to use Augustine's power on them. Delsin realizes that he can absorb Conduit powers and resolves to go to Seattle to take Augustine's powers and save the tribe. Reggie reluctantly accompanies Delsin to keep an eye on him. They reach Seattle and find that it has been put under strict martial law by the D.U.P. to find other escaped Conduits. With Reggie's help, Delsin battles D.U.P. forces and tracks down core fragments to develop his powers. He eventually encounters the other two escaped Conduits, Fetch and Eugene, and absorbs their powers. After both confrontations, Delsin defends Fetch and Eugene from Reggie, who initially views them as "freaks" and can choose to either redeem or corrupt them.

Now possessing three powers, Delsin encounters Hank, who has escaped again. Hank tells Delsin that Fetch and Eugene have been captured by the D.U.P., and are being held on an artificial concrete island in Puget Sound. However, the situation turns out to be a trap set by Augustine. Reggie appears and rescues Delsin with a rocket launcher. While the brothers free Fetch and Eugene, Augustine encases Reggie's feet in concrete and blasts them off the platform. As they dangle above the ocean, Reggie realizes that Delsin cannot save both of them, and lets go of Delsin's hand, falling to his death. Distraught and enraged, Delsin climbs back onto the platform and battles Augustine, and the ensuing fight destroys the island.

Augustine flees back to the D.U.P. headquarters while Delsin tracks Hank down to the docks, where he is fleeing from D.U.P. forces. Hank begs for forgiveness, saying that he only worked with Augustine because she had his daughter in her custody. Delsin can choose to either kill Hank out of revenge or let him flee Seattle with his daughter. Aided by Fetch and Eugene, Delsin rallies an assault on the D.U.P. headquarters. After breaking through the building's defenses, Delsin confronts Augustine and reveals that he has figured out she staged the escape at Salmon Bay to instill fear in the population and give the D.U.P. a reason to continue their regime. Augustine lets Delsin absorb her powers and tells him she wants to save the Conduits by imprisoning and protecting them from the population. However, Delsin points out that all she did was take away their freedom, and people should live their own lives. Delsin battles and eventually defeats Augustine.

==== Endings ====
If Delsin has good Karma, he spares Augustine and exposes her crimes to the public. She is arrested and the D.U.P. disbands. Delsin, Fetch and Eugene successfully champion for peaceful co-existence between humans and Conduits, starting what is dubbed the "Second Age". All of the imprisoned Conduits are freed from Curdun Cay. Delsin returns to the reservation and heals the tribe members with his powers, then spray paints a mural in Reggie's honor.

If Delsin has evil Karma, he kills Augustine and, together with Fetch and Eugene, takes control of Seattle. He plans to release all of the imprisoned Conduits and absorb their powers, but first returns to the reservation. Upon making his way back there, Delsin is confronted by Betty, now in a wheelchair, who exiles him from the tribe for the killings in Seattle. If Delsin has level 5 "Infamous" karma, the scene is slightly longer, depicting a shocked and angered Delsin destroying the reservation with his powers.

== Development ==
=== Origins and PlayStation 4 ===
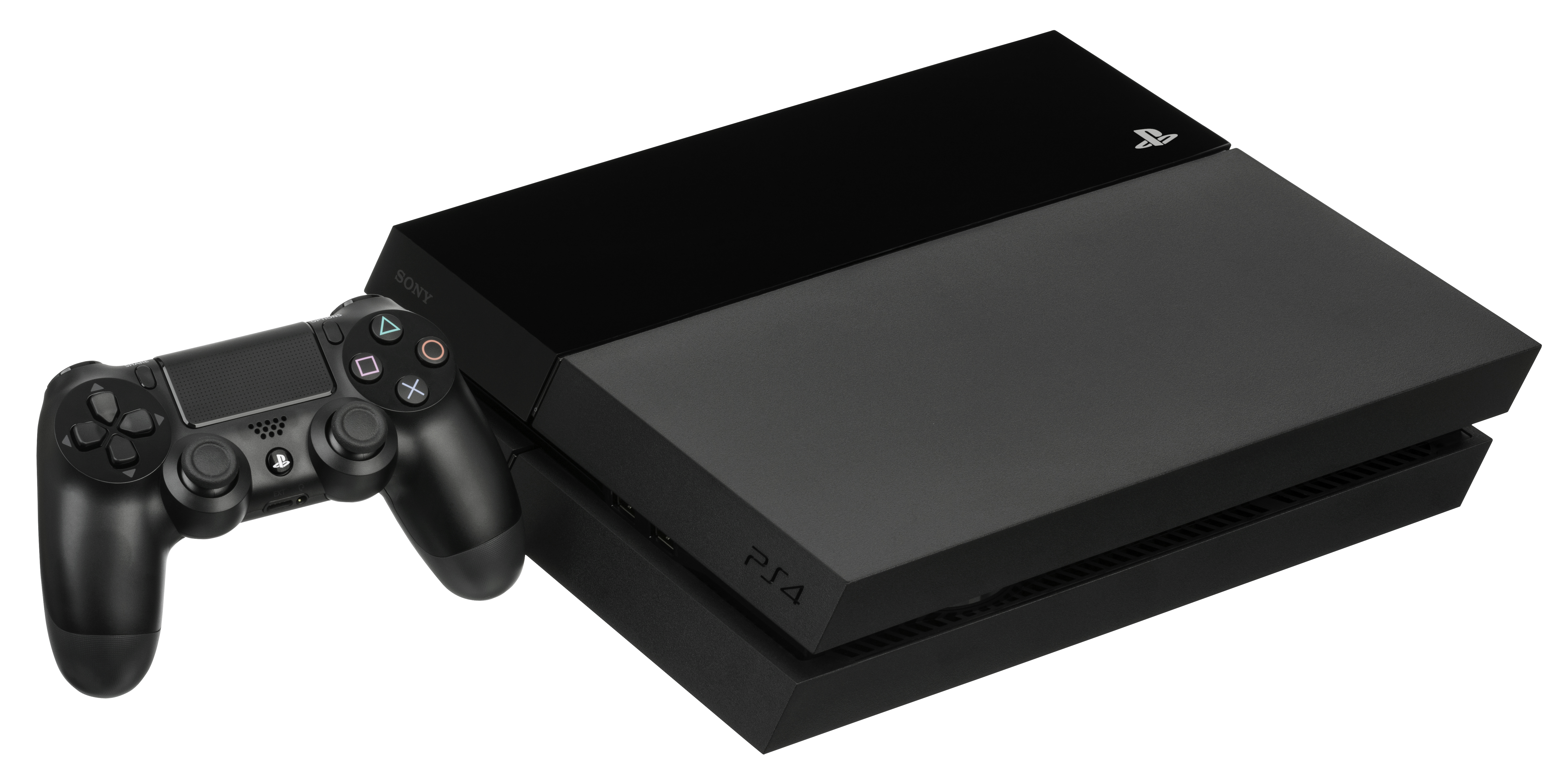
Sucker Punch Productions were very involved with the development of the PlayStation 4 platform. They discussed with Sony how much power they would like with the new hardware and what refinements they would like to see on the DualShock 4 gamepad.

Sucker Punch Productions began to develop Second Son while the PlayStation 4 was still being designed. Having finished work on Infamous: Festival of Blood, they began to plan a new entry in the Infamous series under the working title Infamous 3. As early as 2010, they discussed with Sony their desire to bring Infamous to a new PlayStation platform.

Sucker Punch were in close connection with the PS4's lead system architect Mark Cerny, who visited the studio several times. They gave Cerny feedback about how much power a new PlayStation system would require to render their ideal open world, how fast it would be capable of doing so and to what degree of texture detail. "We had some experience there that was useful for that team when they were planning some aspects of the hardware design", producer Brian Fleming explained. He found that during the PS4's development, there was a great level of interactivity between the system's designers and game developers such as Sucker Punch.

Sucker Punch made suggested improvements they would like to see for the DualShock 4 gamepad. Second Son's designer Jaime Griesemer traveled to Sony's headquarters in Japan to discuss such improvements. The developers found they were able to adopt the DualShock 4's touchpad into Second Son's gameplay (for example, players emulate the in-game fingerprint scanner using the DualShock 4 touchpad).

The game was envisioned to take full advantage of the hardware, without the imposition of porting to older platforms like the PlayStation 3. The hardware let developers improve the particle system that lights Delsin's face up while he draws neon power from billboards and add detailed reflections to the game world. The increased memory bandwidth let the team render characters with higher fidelity. They found the PS4's simplified architecture so easy to work with that they were able to reach very high graphical quality even though the hardware was new.

Over 110 developers worked on the game, a number that director Nate Fox considered small. He felt that working with a small team necessitated having a defined vision for the game from the outset, "to answer those first questions about what you want your game to be". Sometimes, ideas came about during development that would have to be thrown out for not fitting with the game's original vision. "We kill our darlings at Sucker Punch. It's not easy; it's necessary", Fox explained. Second Son displays a native resolution of 1080p at 30 frames per second.

=== Design ===
Second Son's graphical quality was possible because development was conducted on the PS4, which Sucker Punch found powerful and easy to use. Their research for the game world led to the reproduction of Seattle landmarks such as the Space Needle.

Sucker Punch elected to set Second Son in their hometown of Seattle as they could draw from their personal experiences in the open world's design. During early development when team members debated where Second Son would be set, Seattle rated high on a list of possibilities. Fleming considered that the city had not been featured in many games prior to Second Son and so would not be "overblown", and felt that Seattle's weather and mixture of "old and new" architecture would make it an interesting setting. The team conducted fieldwork in Seattle's nearby forests with audio and video equipment, which was used to reproduce local flora and the chirping sounds of local American robins. Seattle landmarks such as Pioneer Square, the Space Needle and Elephant Car Washes feature in the game. The developers licensed logos and signs from local businesses. Griesemer called the game world an "abstraction" of Seattle rather than a re-creation since its layout did not suit Second Son's gameplay and required the team to make necessary changes. The team wanted to thematically explore Seattle's heritage of Pacific Northwest, American Indian tribes in the game.

The designers used graphic sliders in the game engine to determine the amount of water covering the streets. Like Seattle, rain is frequent in the game. The lighting effects (such as neon light from Delsin's powers) coupled with reflections help bring color into Seattle's dark and rainy atmosphere. Because of the move to the PS4, Sucker Punch were able to render more open world than what was possible in previous Infamous games. "You get a better feel of the city when you can see more of it", said Griesemer. Sucker Punch later shared their 3D map of Seattle with Naughty Dog, who used it to understand the city during early development on The Last of Us Part II (2020).

After deciding on Seattle for the setting, the developers began to think about the superpowers that Delsin would possess. They added neon lighting to the city to amplify the "beautiful reflective streets", and subsequently decided to make neon a source of power for Delsin because of its prevalence. Animation director Billy Harper considered Delsin's smoke powers challenging to design, as the team wanted to make powers feel more fluid than in previous Infamous games. They removed Cole's "contorted hand poses" to improve the connection between Delsin and his powers. Fox felt that smoke helps Delsin deftly navigate the game world by letting him zip up buildings and through enemies. Griesemer (who previously worked with Bungie on the Halo series) wanted to bring the fluidity of first-person shooters to Second Son's combat. The team reviewed the control scheme of previous Infamous games and "removed some of the complexity that was preventing people from interacting with the game".

Griesemer said that a recurring theme throughout Infamous games that they wanted to continue with Second Son was the idea of "modern elemental powers", variations on commonplace powers drawn from the game world. Producer Brian Fleming found that the graphical effects helped to inform players of the amount of power Delsin possesses. "This is a game about super powers, so for us, the way the effects look tells you a lot about how you're playing the game", he explained. Fox considered that the game world's resemblance to Seattle helped the superpower elements feel authentic. "Because we have that sweet foundation of plausibility, you buy into the super-powered element", he explained.

=== Character development ===
Second Son's premise is built from the "good ending" of Infamous 2, which sees protagonist Cole MacGrath sacrificing himself to save humanity. They looked at Trophy data and found the majority (78%) of Infamous 2 players chose this ending, and concurred with the popular choice. This allowed them to create the new protagonist, Delsin, from scratch. "Moving forward onto [Second Son], we said 'Alright, Cole's dead. People have voted for this. Let's make a new hero'", Fox explained. Griesemer felt that taking the Infamous series to the PS4 signified a new era, and that departing from the story of previous games would help them reach new audiences. "We needed a new entry point, and Delsin was the first step for that", he explained. The idea to move away from Cole's story came about during pre-production staff meetings, and was confirmed after discussions both internally and with Sony Computer Entertainment. Griesemer described the contemporaneous sentiment as "It's going to be new hardware, a new platform and we're going to have a new audience".

Game Informer journalist Dan Ryckert participated in a demonstration of the motion capture process, where people's faces were captured and rendered in the game using high-definition digital cameras.

Delsin's American Indian heritage came from the game's setting in the Pacific Northwest, which features a large American Indian population. Delsin wears a beanie inspired by one that Harper would wear around the studio (Harper recounted one particular staff meeting where four of the six team members were wearing hats). Delsin's character was inspired by United Kingdom street artist Banksy, as the development team appreciated Banksy's clandestine, satirical work. Developing Delsin's personality, the team posited the hypothetical: "What if Johnny Knoxville had powers? What would he do with it?". Harper considered Delsin "full of reckless abandon", the kind of character that would, upon gaining superpowers, jump off a cliff to see what happens. Fox considered Delsin "flawed in a way I think a lot of us can relate to", trying to live up to his successful brother Reggie. He called the game's story a "hero's journey".

Digital Domain were brought on board for the motion capture work. Fox helped direct the actors' performances, but found that they did not need much guidance for their roles. "You need to let them understand what you need from a scene, but the actors are so much better equipped to deliver that than me", he explained. Fleming considered that using motion capture added authenticity to the characters. "The ability to capture [Delsin's] facial reaction when he's like 'Oh, shit', but doesn't say 'Oh shit'—that's a big deal", he explained.

Most of the non-player characters (NPCs) that inhabit the open world were motion-captured. The developers contacted casting agencies, and asked their friends and families if they would like to appear as extras in the game. Over 75 people were scanned in a three-day period. They were seated in chairs and told not to move or smile, and a high-definition digital camera captured a 3D model of their faces. The camera sent out strobe light patterns to capture the volume and shape of each face. A 360-degree setup captured the actors' moving bodies, but mannequins were also used to help capture different clothing styles. Data collected from the cameras was used by the designers to render digital models, each composed of roughly 1.4 million polygons—any blank spots on the models would be digitally filled in by the designers. To render the models in the game, the data would be compressed by reducing the polygon count.

== Release ==
On February 20, 2013, Sony held a conference in New York that announced the PlayStation 4. Fox appeared on-stage during the conference and recounted participating in an anti-globalization protest in Seattle in 1999. He announced Second Son, and a debut trailer was shown that introduced the game's premise and lead character. The game was privately demoed at E3 2013, and its March 21, 2014, North American release date was confirmed during a PS4 launch event on November 14, 2013. By February 25, 2014, Second Son went gold (finished development).

On March 8, it was announced that Second Son's pre-order sales had surpassed those of The Last of Us in the United Kingdom. Two special edition versions of the game were produced; pre-ordered and first-run copies of the game received the Limited Edition, which includes the Cole's Legacy mission pack that explain story events between Infamous 2 and Second Son. The Collector's Edition includes a unique box cover, a replica of Delsin's beanie, eight pins from his vest, an exclusive in-game vest, and a D.U.P.-themed patch. All pre-ordered copies of the game included four in-game vests for Delsin.

=== Downloadable content ===
Paper Trail is a free downloadable content (DLC) with alternate reality game features. The story is split into six parts, with the first being available after reaching a certain point in the main story. Each subsequent part was made available each Friday from March 28, 2014, in North America and, concluding with the release of the final part on April 25, 2014.

At E3 2014, the spin-off game Infamous First Light was announced and was released on August 26, 2014, in North America and August 27, 2014, in Europe. In First Light, the player controls Fetch. It is a stand-alone expansion and Second Son is not required to play the game, but ownership of Second Son grants players access to exclusive content and music. The track "Sanctus Immortale" composed and produced by Menelik Eu'el Solomon also features on the exclusive content pack. Infamous First Light received mixed to positive reviews from critics.

== Reception ==
=== Critical response ===
Reception

Aggregate score
| Aggregator | Score |
|---|---|
| Metacritic | 80/100 |

Review scores
| Publication | Score |
|---|---|
| Computer and Video Games | 7/10 |
| Destructoid | 9.5/10 |
| Eurogamer | 7/10 |
| GameSpot | 8/10 |
| IGN | 8.7/10 |
| Joystiq | 4.5/5 |
| PlayStation Official Magazine – UK | 8/10 |
| Polygon | 8.5/10 |

Infamous Second Son received "generally favorable" reviews, according to review aggregator website Metacritic.

IGN's Vince Ingenito recalled being left "staring slack-jawed" at the visuals and praised the impressive lighting effects in the "beautifully and diversely realized" open world. GameSpot's Tom Mc Shea called the visuals "incredible". Eurogamer's Oli Welsh praised Seattle's art direction and consistent draw distances and frame rates. Though impressed with the high-definition graphics, PlayStation Official Magazine (OPM)'s David Meikleham cited occasional frame rate dips during intense combat. He enjoyed roaming Seattle and levelling its destructible environments. Computer and Video Games (CVG)'s Tamoor Hussain praised graphical details like the particle and lighting systems. He said the game is "colorful, rich in detail and has some of the best effects we've seen on console".

GameSpot's Mc Shea noted the combat's balance between Infamous's slower pace and Infamous 2's frenetic action. Destructoid's Chris Carter considered the combat's simplicity its strength and found Delsin easy to control during play. Underwhelmed with the opening chapter's "skittish" parkour, Edge noted the game became more fun when Delsin gained powers and reached Seattle. They felt enemies were clever enough to make combat challenging and that missions were "for the most part well designed and generously proportioned". IGN's Ingenito found each power set enjoyable and "strong enough to hang an entire game on". He felt the power upgrades kept combat fresh and made for good replay value. Polygon's Phillip Kollar favored neon, but noted the balance and variety between all sets made combat "a hell of a lot of fun". Eurogamer's Welsh found the combat imperfect yet fun and thought the skill upgrades made minimal difference to gameplay.

Destructoid's Carter was invested in the story as Delsin's charm succeeded "wooden" Cole's listlessness. IGN's Ingenito thought the chemistry between Delsin and Reggie helped pique player interest. He found Troy Baker's performance "[imbued] with a charm and youthful abandon that keeps it from feeling tropey [sic] or overwrought", but thought supporting characters like Fetch were underdeveloped and the narrative too straightforward. Although calling the characters clichéd, Edge felt they were written and acted well. GameSpot's Mc Shea found Delsin annoying and immature, and that the gameplay bettered its "tired" story. Eurogamer's Welsh considered that "inconsequential MacGuffins" drove the plot to a rushed ending but praised its concise scope. Polygon's Kollar felt the lackluster examination of surveillance and security-over-freedom diminished the story's impact. He was disappointed with the narrative despite the better character writing over previous series entries. OPM's Meikleham was put off by Delsin's arrogance and lamented the story, but praised the quality of the motion capture performances.

Edge and Eurogamer's Welsh faulted the morality system's lack of story influence. IGN's Ingenito called it "woefully outdated" as evil choices jarred with Delsin's character. He found the system redundant because Delsin's power peaked when he strictly adhered to good or evil play-styles, rather than crossing in-between. GameSpot's Mc Shea felt the binary system lacked a "moral gray area" between good and evil. Polygon's Kollar struggled to connect to his choices as they were polar opposites on a moral compass. OPM's Meikleham found the system had "little to no impact on gameplay". Joystiq's Danny Cowan thought the well-balanced system had equal incentive and drawback tied to Delsin's choices.

GameSpot's Mc Shea found Second Son's open world beholden to a dated formula. He described Seattle as "a playground for you to go nuts in" instead of "a living, breathing world", with its citizens existing merely as player fodder. CVG's Hussain said the "hauntingly empty" Seattle's sparse NPCs behaved inanimately. He felt the open world's lifelessness was its biggest detractor, a dichotomy against Grand Theft Auto V, Sleeping Dogs and Assassin's Creed IV: Black Flag's superior worlds. Eurogamer's Welsh felt Second Son did not innovate the genre as well as it could have as it leaned too heavily on tropes. Polygon's Kollar felt missions and activities lacked variety, as "virtually all culminate in the goal of beating up more soldiers or thugs". Edge saw little merit in a second play-through as the scarce content was repetitive. "Approach [Second Son] as an action game that just happens to be set in a nonlinear environment and it makes more sense", they wrote. Destructoid's Carter found the amount of content ample, and enjoyed liberating the city and collecting Blast Shards. Tom Watson wrote in New Statesman that Second Son was his £20-£40 game of the year, and justification for his purchasing PlayStation 4 after owning Xbox 360.

=== Sales ===
Infamous Second Son sold over a million units within nine days of its release, and became the second best selling game of March 2014, behind EA's Titanfall, making it one of the best-selling PlayStation 4 games, as well as the fastest-selling installment in the series. As of June 2019, the game has sold an estimated six million units.

=== Awards ===
During the 18th Annual D.I.C.E. Awards, the Academy of Interactive Arts & Sciences nominated Infamous Second Son for "Adventure Game of the Year", "Outstanding Technical Achievement", "Outstanding Achievement in Animation", and "Outstanding Achievement in Character" for Delsin Rowe.
