= Infamous 2 =

2011 action-adventure video game

- Developer: Sucker Punch Productions
- Publisher: Sony Computer Entertainment
- Director: Nate Fox
- Composers: James Dooley; Brain & Melissa; Galactic; Jonathan Mayer
- Series: Infamous
- Platform: PlayStation 3
- Release: NA: June 7, 2011; EU: June 8, 2011; AU: June 9, 2011; UK: June 10, 2011
- Genre: Action-adventure
- Mode: Single-player

Infamous 2 is a 2011 action-adventure video game developed by Sucker Punch Productions and published by Sony Computer Entertainment for the PlayStation 3. The second installment in the Infamous series, it is the sequel to the 2009 video game Infamous.

The story follows protagonist Cole MacGrath on his quest in New Marais to grow powerful enough to be able to face his nemesis, the Beast. Cole possesses electricity-based superpowers which are used in combat and navigating the city. The player is given several opportunities to use these powers for good or selfish purposes in the game's Karma system. The Karma system affects what powers become available, the reaction of the city's populace towards Cole, and the story.

Development on Infamous 2 began immediately after Sucker Punch finished the first Infamous, led by returning game director Nate Fox. The game's music was composed by James Dooley, Bryan Mantia, the band Galactic, and Jonathan Mayer. Both the game's music and fictional city were inspired by New Orleans. Jason Cottle, the original voice actor for Cole, was replaced by Eric Ladin as Sucker Punch wanted somebody who could perform Cole's physical reactions with motion capture, a new addition to the series.

The game was generally well received by gaming media upon release. Praise was particularly directed at its city design, traversal, and graphics, though it was criticized for its Karma system and camera. A standalone expansion titled Infamous: Festival of Blood was released on October 25, 2011. Infamous Second Son, a standalone sequel for the PlayStation 4, was released on March 21, 2014.

== Gameplay ==
Infamous 2 is an action-adventure game set in an open world environment and played from a third-person perspective. The player controls Cole in the world of New Marais. Cole's electricity-based powers are used in movement, offense and defense in combat, and either for better or worse in dealing with the citizens of New Marais. Cole can climb buildings and other structures, grind along power cables and powered train rails, and hover for a short time. Cole can engage in melee combat with enemies using a weapon called the Amp. The game features many different powers, ranging from simple electric bolts to large electric rockets.

Cole defeats an enemy using the Amp. The Karma meter, energy meter, experience gain, and mini-map can be seen.

In order for Cole to use his powers, he must have stored electrical power, represented by an energy meter on the player's heads-up display (HUD). The player can recharge Cole by draining electricity from powered sources, recharging also restores Cole's health, though Cole's health can regenerate over time without recharging. Many powers are acquired over the course of the game. The player can use experience points to increase powers' effectiveness or unlock new powers. Experience points are awarded for actions including defeating enemies, healing citizens and completing missions. The player can use such powers to destroy environmental scenery such as towers and stone columns. Depending on the player's choices, the player can gain ice or fire powers from the game's female protagonists, Kuo and Nix. Additionally, passive abilities based on Karma level called Karmic Boosts can be unlocked.

Starting in a neutral position, Karma can reach up to Hero on the Good side or Infamous on the Evil side. Certain actions, such as stopping to help injured citizens or killing them to restore Cole's health, will affect the Karma level in either direction. Normal story missions may also alter the Karma level. During the game the player will encounter Karma moments, the Karma moments are delivered with 3D cutscenes and character-driven dialogue, the action pauses and the player has two actions that can be taken, always a Good and Evil option. There are also Good and Evil side missions in the game as well as random events which provide Karma decisions. Completion of Karma awarding missions helps gain access to unique powers based on the Karma level. The player is not locked into choosing either Karma path, and may opt to play towards one extreme and later switch to the other mid-game. Karma also influences the way that citizens view Cole in addition to altering Cole's appearance and certain aspects of the game's story.

New Marais is built on two islands, and the player must work through main story missions on the first island before being able to access the next one, though future missions may involve the first island. The player can undertake side missions to make the city safer. A feature called User Generated Content, or UGC, allowed players to make their own missions and share them through PlayStation Network for others to play. This feature was discontinued on August 31, 2026. Scattered around the city are hundreds of "Blast Shards" which Cole can collect to increase the amount of electricity he can store. There are also "Dead Drops" that help to reveal more of the back-story in the game. A mini-map on the player's HUD shows their location in New Marais and what is nearby.

== Plot ==
=== Setting ===
Like the previous entry, InFamous 2 takes place in a fictional city inspired by a real American metropolis. This game takes place in the Southern city of New Marais, heavily inspired by New Orleans. The city is spread across four neighborhoods: the Ville Cochon, the red-light district and entertainment hub (with many parallels to New Orleans' French Quarter); Ascension Parish, the city's historic district that holds a cemetery, cathedral, colonial-era fort, and antebellum plantations; Flood Town (formerly known as Bellevue), a former residential area left flooded and ruined by a large hurricane four years before the events of the games; and the Gas Works, New Marais's center of energy and industry. Being situated in the middle of the Louisiana bayous, the city is also surrounded by multiple smaller settlements and shantytowns.

=== Story ===
A month following the events of InFamous, Cole (Eric Ladin) and his friend Zeke (Caleb Moody) meet with NSA agent Lucy Kuo (Dawn Olivieri), who informs them that Dr. Sebastian Wolfe (Michael Ensign), the man responsible for creating the Ray Sphere that gave Cole his powers, has developed an even stronger version that would give him enough strength to stop the Beast. Before they can depart for Wolfe's lab in New Marais, the Beast attacks Empire City. Cole tries to fight him off, but even his most powerful attack proves useless, resulting in the Beast draining Cole of most of his powers. The group is subsequently forced to flee as Empire City is completely and utterly destroyed.

Arriving in New Marais, Cole and his allies learn that energy magnate Joseph Bertrand III (Graham McTavish), an anti-Conduit demagogue, has seized control of the city. Aware of Wolfe's intentions, Bertrand has his private army, the Militia, destroy the doctor's lab. Rescuing Wolfe, Cole learns that he has developed the Ray Field Inhibitor or RFI, a device capable of stripping Conduits of their powers. Before he can help Cole locate the energy cores needed to power the RFI, which also allows Cole to regain most of his stolen powers along with a few new ones, he is killed by the Militia, who also take Kuo captive. While working to free her, Cole and Zeke meet Roscoe Laroche, a Vietnam veteran who leads a resistance movement opposed to Bertrand, and Nix (Nika Futterman), a Conduit with the ability to manipulate and ignite a black, napalm-like substance, who has been waging war on the Militia. Using intelligence gathered by Zeke, Cole, and Nix, locate a secret lab where Kuo, revealed to be a Conduit, has been forced to transfer her ice-generating powers to an army of human mercenaries controlled by Bertrand. The two free her but release the mentally unstable mercenaries into the city in the process.

With Kuo and Nix's help, Cole undermines Bertrand's influence over New Marais, eventually discovering that Bertrand, who is also a Conduit, has been transforming large numbers of kidnapped civilians into mutant monsters to terrorize the people into supporting him. After exposing Bertrand's plans, Nix explains that when she was young, Bertrand, then a member of the First Sons, used a Ray Sphere built by Wolfe to gain powers, killing hundreds of innocent people, including her mother. After realizing that his powers could only turn him into a deformed monster, Bertrand vowed to cleanse the world of Conduits by unleashing hordes of them upon the world in the hope that humans would ultimately rebel and exterminate them. With the Conduits and the resistance movement joining forces, Bertrand is killed in his mutated form, ending his authoritarian rule.

With the Beast in New Marais, Cole reunites with John White (Phil LaMarr), who he thought had died in the process of destroying the first Ray Sphere. John admits that he has become the Beast and gives Cole a vision of humanity perishing from a plague born of the radiation from the Empire City incident. As Conduits are immune, White uses his newfound powers to activate the Conduit gene in plague victims, claiming that the only way Cole can save the world is to turn his back on humanity. After locating and absorbing the last core, Cole prepares to activate the RFI. However, he realizes that while doing so will cure the plague, it will kill every Conduit on Earth. Kuo abandons humanity out of fear and sides with White, while Nix sides with humanity since she will no longer be unique in a world of conduits.

==== Ending ====
In the good ending, Cole sides with humanity. Cole and Nix work to charge the RFI, while Laroche and most of his followers sacrifice themselves to hold back the Beast. Nix eventually sacrifices herself as well, injuring the Beast and leaving Cole with just enough time to finish the process and supercharge his powers. After defeating the Beast, Cole activates the device, killing himself, Kuo, the Beast, and thousands of other Conduits, even those who had not yet developed their powers; yet, the plague is completely and permanently erased, saving everyone. In honor of Cole's heroism, he is given the posthumous title of "Patron Saint of New Marais." As Zeke takes his coffin out to sea for burial, a lightning bolt in the form of a question mark strikes in the distance.

In the evil ending, Cole sides with White, causing Nix and Zeke to turn against him and steal the RFI. Together with Kuo and the Beast, Cole rampages through New Marais, killing Laroche and what remains of the Militia. He eventually catches up with his former friends, killing them and destroying the RFI. The Beast, weak from overusing his power, dies after tasking Cole and Kuo with finishing his plan and transferring his powers over to Cole. Fully embracing his role as the new Beast, Cole prepares to build a new era for the Conduits.

== Development ==
Gaming journals reported the likelihood of a sequel to Infamous due to a Twitter post made by actor David Sullivan reporting on auditioning for the role of Cole in the game's sequel. In April 2010, Sony purchased the domain name "infamousthegame.com", increasing speculation that a sequel was in development. The game was unveiled on June 4, 2010, when Game Informer released the cover for their July 2010 issue which featured a preview of the game. Development of Infamous 2 started immediately after the first Infamous had finished development. Sucker Punch hired their own QA staff to test and report bugs for the game. Game director Nate Fox, director of the original, also directed Infamous 2. The core development team consisted of 65 to 75 people, an amount considered "small".

Promotional artwork showing Cole's initial design (left) and a screenshot of Cole's final character design (right)

When designing Infamous 2, Sucker Punch decided to look at everything that could be improved, saying "everything was on the table". Due to negative feedback from fans, they redesigned the main character, Cole. Cole initially underwent many changes, to the extent of making him look like a different character. However, after being "taken aback by the uproar of fan support for the original Cole," Sucker Punch combined elements of the original with the new design. Some of Cole's clothing was changed to suit the new setting of the game. Eric Ladin was also brought in to replace Jason Cottle as the voice of Cole because Sucker Punch felt that they needed someone who could perform Cole's physical reactions as well as his voice with the use of their new motion capture technology.

The 3D cutscenes were improved with motion capture technology to create a more cinematic experience. The stylized comic-like cut scenes from the first game carried over into the sequel, though they were reserved for bigger moments in the game. The 3D cutscenes were used to tell the story going on in the moment, while the comic-like cutscenes were used to tell a large piece of the story in a short amount of time. In addition to the cut scenes, the moral element of the original also transferred to the sequel. When incorporating the player's Karma decisions from the first game into the second, it was found challenging to balance the effects of importing saves from the original Infamous and keeping the game interesting for those who did not. The melee combat in the game was redesigned from the original with finishing moves being added. A large focus on the melee combat was the presentation, which was meant to make the player feel super-powered.

The game's fictional city, New Marais, was inspired by New Orleans, though many other southern influences were mixed and matched. It was thought New Orleans was architecturally the "coolest city in America" and well suited to a superhero who climbs and also allowed Sucker Punch to have environmental variety. New Marais was designed to have distinct neighborhoods with tonal as well as architectural shifts between them. Parkour elements, such as the game's grind rails, were integrated more into the environment to improve the flow of it, while powers such as the vertical grind, were incorporated into the parkour. The goal of the city was to have a "big old jungle gym". Street musicians were added to the city because they were considered an integral part of the New Orleans vibe. Gabriel Knight: Sins of the Fathers was seen by game director Nate Fox as extremely inspirational and stated that the city's role in the story was something they wanted to replicate in Infamous 2.

The game's music was composed by James Dooley, Bryan "Brain" Mantia, Melissa Reese, the New Orleans band Galactic, and Jonathan Mayer. All of the music was recorded live with a total of four hours of music being recorded. Starting from the first day of recording, the music was composed in a year. Many of the music's sounds were produced unconventionally, with some of the largest percussion coming from things such as fingernails on an amplified tin plate. Collaboration was considered a major part of writing the music, with the composers "ripping each other off." Themes were composed for the main characters, such as Cole and Nix. A dynamic music system was developed for non-mission gameplay. The game would track a music tension value with thresholds set to determine what the music would be. While missions used the dynamic music system too, the music was laid out more like a movie with set music occurring for specific events. The music of the game was inspired by the city, meant to be "organic" compared to the industrial and electronic music of the first Infamous. The score was released as two soundtracks, Infamous 2 The Blue Soundtrack and Infamous 2 The Red Soundtrack.

Sucker Punch was using around 30% of the Cell processor by the end of Infamous, and for Infamous 2, they were "creeping up over 50 and 60%, because [they] know how to put things on to the Cell processor." With the additional power, Sucker Punch was able to "have more characters on-screen, more complicated shaders, and much greater layering". For the game, a new method of ambient occlusion (AO) was developed, a hybrid of precomputed AO and dynamic AO. The new method was used to render contact shadows and self-occlusion for moveable objects and was meant to complement the other methods of AO already used.

On March 1, 2011, Sucker Punch announced a mission creation feature for Infamous 2 that had been in development since 2009. A limited beta for testing this feature was released in April 2011. Sucker Punch wanted to give players a way to continue enjoying the game after completing it and felt there was immense pressure to incorporate multiplayer and that many games were tacking it on. They considered cooperative gameplay, though found it did not make for an experience you wanted to keep playing, saying "ultimately, the game still ends."

In October 2011, it was announced that PlayStation Move support would cover the whole game as part of an update which would come out sometime after Infamous: Festival of Blood was released, along with a new cutscene creation tool for the UGC creator. The update was released on November 2, 2011.

== Release ==
The game was released in North America on June 7, 2011, in Europe on June 8, 2011, in Australia on June 9, 2011, in the United Kingdom, Ireland, and Germany on June 10, 2011, and in Japan on July 7, 2011. On February 18, 2011, before the game's release, Special Edition and Hero Edition versions of Infamous 2 were announced for pre-order. The Special Edition included an Original Cole skin, a Golden Amp skin, and the Electrocution Grenade power. The Hero Edition included everything from the Special Edition but also included: a Cole MacGrath statue, a sportable sling pack modeled after Cole's, a Kessler skin, the Lightning Hook power, a Reaper skin, a Sly Cooper's cane skin, a samurai sword skin, a caveman club skin, the Infamous #1 comic, and Infamous 2 The Red Soundtrack. The Hero Edition came with all of the DLC except for the Stalker Grenades and the Sniper Blast powers, and the three extra Subway Missions, which are now all available via the PlayStation Store.

Infamous 2 – along with Infamous and Infamous: Festival of Blood – was released on August 28, 2012, as part of the Infamous Collection under Sony's new line of PlayStation Collections for the PlayStation 3.

=== Collaborations ===
A six issue Infamous comic series, which bridges the stories of the first Infamous and Infamous 2, was published by DC Comics. Cole appeared as a guest character for the PlayStation 3 and PlayStation Vita versions of Street Fighter X Tekken. Additionally, Good and Evil Cole appeared as playable characters in the PlayStation 3 and PlayStation Vita exclusive PlayStation All-Stars Battle Royale. An Infamous 2 mini-pack was released as downloadable content to LittleBigPlanet 2, containing Good and Evil Cole costumes.

== Reception ==
Reception

Aggregate score
Aggregator	Score
Metacritic	83/100

Review scores
Publication	Score
1Up.com	B+
Eurogamer	8/10
Game Informer	8.75/10
GameSpot	7.5/10
GameSpy	4.5/5
GamesRadar+	4/5
GameTrailers	9.2/10
Giant Bomb	4/5
IGN	9.0/10

Infamous 2 received "generally positive reviews", according to review aggregator website Metacritic.

The story of Infamous 2 was divisive. Sterling McGarvey from GameSpy thought the story was a "pulpy comic book narrative", Colin Moriarty of IGN found the story well-delivered and "incredible", and Eurogamer's Christian Donlan found the endings of the game to be "genuinely satisfying" and an improvement on the overarching storyline of the series. Conversely, Andrew Reiner of Game Informer found the story disengaging with confusing narrative threads, Giant Bomb's Brad Shoemaker felt the story was scattered and had too much going to find its center, and Tom Mc Shea from GameSpot described the story as bland and lacking a hook to invest the player in Cole's affairs.

IGN's Moriarty thought that New Marais was more living and breathing than Empire City and the overall look of the game was improved over the original. Game Informer's Reiner saw the city as a "sightseeing marvel." GameSpy's McGarvery found the game was much cleaner-looking than the first. GameSpot's Mc Shea noted the city's neighborhoods were varied and felt alive, and found the visuals "great-looking". Eurogamer's Donlan wrote "New Marais is every bit as good at its job as Empire City was".

GameSpot's Mc Shea considered movement through the city a pleasure, but criticized the many fights tedious. Eurogamer's Donlan stated Infamous 2 is "video games' true master of parkour" and found the combat struggled to match the thrills of traversal but that the combat had improved since the original. Game Informer's Reiner enjoyed combat, describing the situations as "amazing open-world superhero fights." Giant Bomb's Brad Shoemaker felt enemies were overwhelming at times during combat like in the original Infamous. Mc Shea found the pacing uneven and the morality system "laughable". Shoemaker felt the powers of Good and Evil Cole were better balanced than in the first game and saw morality as only a gateway to cutscenes and the possible powers. GameTrailers's reviewer said the morality system did not provide tough decisions, but provided two dramatically different gameplay experiences. Both Mc Shea and Reiner thought UGC was a "great" addition to the game. 1UP reviewer Thierry Nguyen hoped Sucker Punch would mix the combat and traversal of the game with the pacing and storytelling of the first Infamous to create an "utterly fantastic" superhero game.

GameSpot's Mc Shea found that problems would occur during precise climbing because of Cole getting "sucked" towards objects during climbing, though found it made climbing easier in other aspects. Giant Bomb's Brad Shoemaker also appreciated the way Cole would be drawn to things while climbing but found that it led to frustrating moments where Cole would grab onto the wrong area. IGN's Moriarty criticized the game's camera, calling it "wonky", while GameSpy's McGarvey thought the game needed a better targeting system as the camera could not consistently keep up with the action. Eurogamer's Donlan found the draw distance was low, though the frame rate improved from the first game. Shoemaker also noticed the frame rate had been mostly corrected since the first, making the game more fluid.

The game was listed on IGN's Top 25 PlayStation 3 Games, achieving rank 14. Infamous 2 received a nomination for Outstanding Achievement in Original Music Composition at the 15th Annual Interactive Achievement Awards, as well as a nomination for Best PS3 Game at the 2011 Spike Video Game Awards.

=== Sales ===
According to the NPD Group, Infamous 2 sold 369,200 copies in North America during the month of June and was the third highest selling game of the month, though the best selling SKU of the month according to Sony.

== Continuation ==
A stand-alone expansion for Infamous 2, titled Infamous: Festival of Blood, was announced at Gamescom and released on October 25, 2011. A vampire-themed spinoff, Infamous: Festival of Blood features a non-canon story set in New Marais. The story follows an infected Cole that must kill the vampire which bit him in order to save his soul. The game featured new enemies and powers. A standalone sequel to Infamous 2, titled Infamous Second Son, was announced in 2013 and released worldwide in March 2014 for the PlayStation 4. The game takes place seven years after Infamous 2 and follows Delsin Rowe, a new protagonist in the city of Seattle.

On August 31, 2026, the online servers for the UGC missions were discontinued. Players are no longer able to share created missions online using this service.
