= Infamous (comics) =

2011 comic book series by DC Comics

- Cover art illustrated by Doug Mahnke, showcasing protagonist Cole MacGrath

Publication information
- Publisher: DC Comics
- Format: Ongoing series
- Genre: Superhero
- Publication date: March – August 2011
- No. of issues: 6

Creative team
- Written by: William Harms
- Artist(s): Eric Nguyen; Doug Mahnke (Cover)

Infamous is a 2011 superhero comic book series based on the video game of the same name published by DC Comics in association with Sucker Punch Productions. The comic book followed the adventure of superhero, Cole MacGrath, and takes place in between the events of Infamous and Infamous 2. The comic primarily depicts Cole's escape from Empire City in the first game to New Marais in the second game. The comic features illustrations by Eric Nguyen as well as a cover art by Doug Mahnke with the story written by William Harms. The first issue of the six-part comic series was released in March 2011.

== Story ==
=== Issue #1 ===
In the first issue, it is revealed that Moya was working with Kessler on the last stages of the Ray Sphere's Development and also helped fund his research. While working at an old First Sons research facility in the Neon district, Kessler reveals to Moya one of his test subjects, David, who had been exposed to the Ray Sphere eleven times. He explains to her that each exposure to the Ray Sphere "unlocks a new ability" within a conduit. In the present, the government is still covering up the situation in Empire City while over in the Historic District, Cole is mourning by Trish's grave until he is eventually confronted and consoled by Warden Harms. The two then make plans to flush out the rest of the First Sons by Pier 12.

Meanwhile, over by the Steel Harbour, Moya has gathered several volunteer test subjects with one of them, Lieutenant Poole, being replaced by a mysterious man because of a "blood abnormality." Moya also has Alden Tate in custody and has her team of surgeons to sedate and perform a biopsy on him. Later that night, tension builds between Cole and Zeke as Cole tells him the truth about Kessler; that he is Cole from the future who came back in time to set up the Ray Sphere, Cole's powers, the quarantine and even Trish's death. All so that Cole would be powerful enough to face the Beast.

During that same night, David has escaped his containment from the First Sons' research facility and seeks refuge at his home in North Beach, in the Neon, only to find his wife dead from a drug overdose. Enraged, David begins to seek revenge on Cole, who he believes is Kessler in disguise.

=== Issue #2 ===
With the Quarantine in its 25th day, Moya continues planning the invasion of Empire City and the capturing of Cole MacGrath. As Alden is already in custody, Moya moves to the next phase of her plan: capturing Sasha. She explains that Sasha likes Cole and that they can't move against him until she is in custody.

Sasha is eventually captured by Moya's troops and is taken to the Steel Harbour, where her mind control tar is extracted with the intention of using it to capture Cole.

Meanwhile, over in the Warren, Cole is having an identity crisis and confides with Zeke, despite their past issues. Cole feels as though he has lost everything that's made him who he is because of Kessler. Zeke reveals to Cole that after he took off with Kessler and the Ray Sphere, he was just locked in a room with "a bed, TV and piss bucket". He goes on to say that Kessler would sometimes stumble in "drunk off his ass" only to leave after an hour or so. Then one day he comes in and tells Zeke goodbye and thanks him for being such a good friend.

Zeke, not understanding the significance of this at the time, finally understood what Kessler was talking about. He tells Cole that at the end of the day, Kessler was just "some guy" and that just because he changed Cole's future, doesn't mean he controls Cole.

In that moment of consolation, there is a sudden missile attack and military troops invade the city. Cole tells Zeke to alert Warden Harms before he engages in a fierce battle.

In the Neon, troops are flooding the streets and in David's home he has placed the bodies of his wife and daughter on a bed respectfully with crucifixes and lit candles all around the room. He recalls flashbacks of his normal self playing with his daughter.

Suddenly troops gather outside his house only to die by his hands. David continues his search to find Cole while killing more Blast survivors (situated in the sewers) in the process. The media continues their cover up by saying that Military troops are demolishing weak structures of the city to prevent them from collapsing and injuring anyone. They also say that they are relocating citizens into security camps when in reality they are actually killing people.

In the meantime, Moya contacts Cole through his cell phone and explains that she sent those troops to lock down the rest of the city and to show him how serious she was. She then goes on to say Cole has until tomorrow morning "then the gloves come off".

=== Issue #3 ===
In issue #3, a flash back to day of the blast, Kessler teleported to Cole's location and made sure he is fine, then he hopes that Cole can forgive him for what he's done. In the present Cole is in the police station wondering if he should give himself to Moya or not, at the same time David attacks the station and kills some policemen and nearly kills Zeke until Cole comes to the rescue. Moya is informed of what is happening and redeploys the soldiers to stop David from killing Cole. David, who believes Cole to be Kessler, starts beating him without mercy. Moya wanted to use two of who's in the stasis to be in the field to stop David, but the doctor tells her that is impossible and they are not ready.

Moya responded by saying she wasn't asking, but the doctor tells her if they are out of the stasis they will die before they take one step. Moya tells him if Cole dies it will be his ass. In the field, as the soldiers are being killed by David, Cole tries to take the fight to another place. At first the plan works but David quickly catches up with Cole and slams him into a building. Moya contacts Cole and tells him to get out of the building before it is bombed. Cole manages to get out, but David is caught in the explosion and buried under the wreckage. Cole returns to the police station and tells them he can't stay because the "thing" was after him and he needs Zeke's apartment keys because he needs a place to sleep.

Zeke argues with Cole. Cole tells him he was saved by Moya but he can still can hear it (David) down there scraping around, trying to escape and if it wants to kill him so bad then it can kill him alone so that no one else will get hurt. In the Steel Harbor Moya tells the general about David and tells him that he was blasted with the Ray Sphere over thirty times but there was a significant flaw that didn't reveal itself until it was too late. The flaw is revealed to be that David consumes neuroelectricity and without it he will die, but he can store enough for a few weeks. The doctor asks them what if David escaped the city or killed Cole, as without Cole they can't replicate the effect of the Ray Sphere.

Moya tells them that one of David's powers is to "smell" people on the genetic level and he is after Cole because he wants revenge for what Kessler did to him. The general reveals that they already know Kessler and Cole are the same person but asks if David knows that. Moya answers with more or less, for David they are the same person and he will not stop until Cole is dead. They decide to get Cole as far away from Empire City as possible and since every attempt to capture him failed, they will change their method and will "attack his heart" to capture him. The issue ends with Cole in Zeke's apartment looking at pictures of Trish and the picture which he took from Kessler whilst he cries.

=== Issue #4 ===
In issue #4, a flash back show Moya trying to arrest Kessler, but Kessler kills the soldiers Moya brought along. Moya then asks Kessler what he is, Kessler tells her she doesn't want to know and that the Ray Sphere is with NSA Agent John White. Moya tells Kessler she will deal with John later, and tells Kessler that he will not get out of the city alive. After she leaves, Kessler says to himself he "didn't plan to".

Then Kessler takes a look at the picture of his wedding day and says "One short sleep past, we wake eternally, and death shall be no more, thou shalt die." In the present Moya locates Cole, who is sleeping in Zeke's apartment. Cole has a dream involving Kessler showing him where he buried his wife and daughters. Kessler then tells him that The Beast is coming, and that it's ravenous, unstoppable.

Kessler tells Cole that the road ahead is full of graves, and if he is going to do what needs to be done, he must ignore all the graves regardless of whose bones they hold. Cole wakes up, not sure how much he can stomach, with the military watching him. Zeke and Warden Harms are moving through the Jefferson tunnel, the warden asks Zeke what happened between them.

Zeke tells the warden what happened and that he is not sure if Cole will ever forgive him. The warden tells Zeke before Cole forgive him he must forgive himself first. In the Neon District, David rises from the wreckage' still determined to kill Kessler/Cole before he "returns home to his wife and daughter as he promised". While Cole is in Zeke's apartment, a group of soldiers prepare to enter the apartment and throw a gas bomb. When Cole is exposed to the gas he starts to suffer hallucinations about Trish blaming him for her death. Sasha contacts him telepathically and tells him what he sees is not real and Moya is using her gift to confuse him. Sasha then tells him to get out of the apartment. He does so by jumping from the window, but the hallucinations don't go away. Zeke and the warden are outside the building the moment Cole jumped, as well as the soldiers who ignore the two and capture Cole. David watches as the soldiers fly away with Cole.

Meanwhile, two reporters enter the city and finds one of the survivors who takes them to show them what is really going on. While Cole is being withheld and the doctors try to keep him awake, Sasha contacts him and tells him she's not going to let anything happen to him. She also tells him that Moya thinks she's beaten her, but she's wrong and she'll see her dead. When Cole's vitals stabilize, Moya says the two of them need to have a long talk.

=== Issue #5 ===
In issue #5, a flashback into the past 4 months prior to the blast shows David's wife, calling his work for the fourth time. Kessler tells her that David turned down the job and stopped working for them a month ago, and that David wanted a fresh start, leaving all of this behind him. He also mentions that he was a very sad, broken man and had a drinking problem. Meanwhile, David is being blasted with the Ray Sphere. She tells Kessler that she knows who he is and warns him she is going to call the police. Kessler tells her that if it will make her feel better, she can call the police, but she should consider the fact that her husband simply left her. Before she could tell him that she was not going to let him get away with what he's done, Kessler hangs up. He tells another person to send someone to keep an eye on her and get in touch with their contact in the police to make sure they stay out of the facility.

In the present, the two reporters follow one of the survivors to the sewers. She tells them she will show them what is really going on if they agree to take her and the corpse of her father out of the city. The reporters are initially reluctant, but she convinces them that their station will "move heaven and earth" to get a story of this magnitude. She then leads them to a makeshift underground hospital.

At the Steel Harbor, Moya tries to persuade Cole to work for the military. When she sees that he will not do it willingly, she shows him a device and tells him that when they put it at the base of his skull he will do whatever they say, whether he wants to or not.

At the Warren, Zeke, the Warden, and a group of policemen make their move to save Cole, while back at the Neon District in the sewers the reporter interviews the survivors. Back at the Steel Harbor, David arrives and can sense that Cole is there alone, cornered, and this time he can't escape him, At the same time Sasha frees herself, kills some guards and makes her way to Cole just in time to save him, while David is outside killing some soldiers. Zeke's group were seen by the soldiers, who started to shoot at them. David kills most of the soldiers before Moya is informed about Cole's escape. While he is making holes in the ship walls to escape, Moya tells the doctor to open all the stasis containers, but the doctor tells her they are still not ready. At same time, David catches Cole's smell. Cole jumps out of the ship and Moya argues with the doctor before holding him at gun point and telling him she wasn't asking. Sasha is shown killing some soldiers. Cole meets Zeke and the Warden outside. David sees Cole and heads straight for him. Cole tries to run but David catches up with him.

The reporters come out from the sewers in time to see Cole at the mercy of David. Moya tells the ones who come out of stasis to make sure Cole is not to be harmed, and everyone else is expendable. Meanwhile, David is killing Cole, blaming him for the death of his wife and daughter. He says he can still hear the voice of his wife on the phone, crying, begging, desperate to find him and it was the last time he heard her voice; it's his last memory of her and it's all that he thinks about. Before he can kill Cole, he is stopped by 3 Military Conduits. Cole mocks David by telling him he thinks "David pissed off the wrong people."

=== Issue #6 ===
In the miniseries' finale, a flashback shows that a few days before the present, Cole is still recovering from the blast with Trish by his side. Zeke tells her that before she met him, Cole was hit by a truck. She mentions that Cole told her about it, but Zeke tells her that's what he tells everyone, to make it sound like it was no big deal; in reality, it should have killed him. The front of the truck hit him in the chest, whipped him around and rolled him under tires, running over both of his legs. A few days later, Cole walked away with only a few bruises. Zeke then reassures Trish that Cole will survive the ordeal. In the present, Sasha is trying to find Moya on the ship.

Moya sneak attacks Sasha with a pipe and tells Sasha she should have left when she could and now she is going to kill her. Outside, the Military Conduits are fighting David. Cole is knocked out and Sasha retaliates against Moya. David kills one of the Military Conduits by absorbing his neuro-electricity. Zeke helps Cole to stand up and asks him "What are those things?". Cole answers that they are probably something Moya cooked up.

Soldiers arrive to help Moya, while the reporters and the survivor make a run for it. While David is fighting the other Conduits he notices that they stink just like Moya and concludes that her guilt is thick as Kessler's. He then kills another Conduit by ripping him into two. Sasha escapes and Cole watches as David is killing the last Conduit. Cole remembers how he dropped out of college six credits short of graduation because he got pissed off by how a professor treated one of his friends.

He walked away then and he's been walking away ever since, from his father, from jobs, from himself and decides that his days of walking away are over and goes to fight David. Cole cut one of David arms only to be hit and sent right into ship. After the general finds out what Moya did, he threatens to shut her operation down, only for Moya to kill him. David kills the last Military Conduit and goes after Cole to finish him. Moya tells the others that if anything happens to Cole, she is going to kill them herself. Meanwhile, Cole fights David and their fight cause a hole in the ship that David falls into. Moya goes after him and so does Cole. Their fight continues which is tearing the ship apart. Cole finds jet fuel and uses it to burn David.

Moya arrives and Cole uses Lightning Storm to finish David off. While David is dying, he sees a vision of his family. He says he's sorry and ask them to forgive him. They tell him there is nothing to forgive and they love him before he dies. Moya tells Cole that with one phone call, there will be $30 million bounty on his head and even his own parents will sell him out. The ship starts to sink, and Moya gets trapped. Cole tries to help her but she tells him there is no time and he must go before the water kills him. Cole runs and Moya dies with the ship sinking.

Two days later, the news shows the event of Military conduits and Cole fighting David that was provided by the reporters Phil Maabe and Linda Kaufman. It also shows how the sick and the injured are forced to live in the sewers, the sinking ship claimed 300 lives, Moya was working without the authorization from her superiors or the US Military, Cole is still at large and the CDC confirms that the quarantine will remain in place for the foreseeable future. At the Warren Zeke asks Cole if he thinks that "Monster-Thing" is dead for good. Cole says he really hopes so. While talking about the news, Cole is called by a woman named Lucy Kuo. She tells him she worked with John White in the NSA and that they need to talk.

== History ==
The comic is based on a video game that was actually inspired by comic books, namely two DC Comics series, DMZ and Batman: No Man's Land. The series shares similarities in regards to the setting of the story, which is focused on a city after a large scale disaster. Like many comic books published in the 1990s, the series has a grim take on the superhero genre. Apart from influence from those comic series, the film Batman Begins which was based on the DC Comics super hero Batman was also an influence for the series.
