= Infamy (disambiguation) =

Infamy is a notoriety gained from ill repute (as opposed to fame).

Infamy may also refer to:

- Infamy (album), a 2001 album by Mobb Deep
- Infamy (TV series), a 2023 Polish drama television series
- Infamy, a 2008 EP by Heaven Below
- "Infamy", a song by The Rolling Stones from their 2005 album A Bigger Bang
- Infamy, a measure of a player's skill in the game War Commander
- "Infamy, infamy, they've all got it in for me", spoken by Kenneth Williams in the British comedy film Carry On Cleo (1964)

== See also ==
- A Universal History of Infamy, a collection of short stories by Jorge Luis Borge
- Infamia, in ancient Roman culture, a loss of legal or social standing
- Infamous (disambiguation)
- The Infamy Speech, delivered by U.S. President Roosevelt to Congress in 1941
- Little Infamies, a 2002 collection of short stories by Panos Karnezis
- Living in Infamy, a comic book miniseries by Ben Raab
- The Terror: Infamy, season 2 of the AMC-TV series The Terror
