= Infamous First Light =

2014 video game

- Developer: Sucker Punch Productions
- Publisher: Sony Computer Entertainment
- Director: Nate Fox
- Producer: Brian Fleming
- Composers: Marc Canham; Nathan Johnson; Brain
- Series: Infamous
- Platform: PlayStation 4
- Release: NA: August 26, 2014; PAL: August 27, 2014
- Genre: Action-adventure
- Mode: Single-player

Infamous First Light is a 2014 action-adventure game developed by Sucker Punch Productions and published by Sony Computer Entertainment for the PlayStation 4. The game is a standalone companion to Infamous Second Son and serves as a prequel, but does not require a copy of Second Son in order to play. It was announced in June 2014 at E3 2014 and was released digitally in August 2014, with a physical release only being released in Europe, Asia, and Australia in September 2014.

Played in a third-person perspective, the player takes control of Abigail "Fetch" Walker (introduced as a supporting character in Second Son), a young woman classed by the Department of Unified Protection as a "conduit" who possesses superhuman powers. In custody of the D.U.P., Fetch is ordered to tell the story of the events leading up to her capture. The player can use their Neon powers to defeat enemies and traverse the environment while completing the game's levels. The game primarily takes place in the streets of a fictionalized version of Seattle and in and around the prison, Curdun Cay.

Infamous First Light received generally mixed reviews from critics, who praised the protagonist Fetch, with some commenting that she was a better character compared to Second Son protagonist Delsin, while the visuals, controls, gameplay, and challenge arenas were also commended. Criticism was aimed towards the game's story and combat mechanics.

== Gameplay ==
Infamous First Light is an action-adventure game set in an open world environment and played from a third-person perspective, similar to Infamous Second Son; players complete levels, defeat enemies and finish side missions. The player takes control of Abigail "Fetch" Walker, a young "conduit" who possesses superhero-like 'Neon' powers. With a few exceptions, Abigail's powers play identically to Delsin Rowe's Neon powers, but First Light introduces several new features. In Neon races, Fetch can chase down floating balls of Neon gas and Conduit energy called "Lumens" that reward her with skill points to increase her powers. The graffiti mini game from Second Son is present; it has been aesthetically altered to match Fetch's Neon style. In Arena Challenges, both Fetch and Delsin can fight against hordes of holographic enemies. Completing challenges rewards the player with skill points that they can use to upgrade their abilities. Exclusive to the arena is a new enemy faction: Demons, with their own unique powers and abilities.

== Plot ==
Abigail "Fetch" Walker, a young conduit in the D.U.P.'s custody in their prison Curdun Cay, is ordered to give a demonstration of her powers to one Brooke Augustine by battling holographic foes created by fellow Conduit Eugene. Once that is done, Fetch is told to tell the events that led up to her arrest.

Seven years earlier, Fetch was one of the first of the new Conduits who emerge following the Beast's rampage across the countryside. Although her parents tried to cope at first, they were left with few options after Fetch injured one of her classmates by mistake. Fetch's older brother, Brent Walker, immediately grabbed Fetch and ran away with her; the pair turned to drug use to cope but Brent eventually got clean, even going as far as to hide Fetch's stash to help her get clean as well. Brent also made Fetch keep the use of her powers to a minimum to avoid suspicion. For years, Brent worked for gangs to acquire enough funds to buy a boat and sneak across the border from Seattle to Canada, where the D.U.P.'s authority does not extend. However, a gang of Russian mobsters known as the Akurans destroyed the boat, took Brent hostage, and nearly killed Fetch with a bomb.

Using her powers, Fetch survives and begins looking for Brent. Fetch soon meets Shane, one of Brent's old contacts and a small-time drug lord also looking for Brent. Shane takes advantage of Fetch's naivety to use her to win a gang war with the Akurans almost single-handedly. When they find Brent, Shane takes him hostage and forces Fetch to help him cement his hold on Seattle's drug trade. Back in the present, Augustine theorizes that the new powers Fetch develops may be a reaction to extreme trauma to help her cope. On the condition that she show her all of her powers, Augustine allows Fetch to fight holograms of her D.U.P. troops. Once the task is completed, Fetch continues her story.

Another employee of Shane's working for the city's tech support department, named Jenny, offers to help look for Brent. Jenny has narrowed down where Shane is keeping Brent to four shipping crates dotted around the city. Finding the crates not only does Fetch discover that Brent is not in any of them but Shane, already on to them, hunts down and kills Jennifer. Shane has Fetch help him force the police's favor by having her slaughter the police force while he has a sit-down with the chief. The police chief agrees to Shane's terms, on the condition that Fetch leaves Seattle and does not come back.

With this, Shane sends Fetch to pick up her brother. Unfortunately it turns out to be a trap where Shane attempts to kill Fetch with a homemade gas chamber; Fetch however is able to pull through and escape. Back in the present, realizing that Fetch is still holding out on her, Augustine decides to send her to another new arena. Taking inspiration from Eugene's love of the Heaven's Hellfire game, Augustine has Fetch fight her literal Demons. Once the third arena is completed, Augustine has Fetch finish the story. The still-alive Fetch "negotiates" a new deal with Shane, he hands over Brent, alive and intact, and she stops tearing apart his gang and operation. Shane has Fetch meet him at the Crocodile where he sticks her with a drug filled needle. In the resulting drugged haze, Fetch accidentally kills Brent, leaving her emotionally distraught and defenseless as the D.U.P. closes in on her.

Back in the present, Augustine reveals that she had known Fetch's story all along, and reveals that she has Shane in custody, while offering Fetch the chance to kill him. Accepting Augustine's offer, Fetch attacks Shane, destroying part of the prison wall in the process. Shane survives and escapes by hijacking an APC, with the D.U.P. and a freed Fetch in hot pursuit. With the D.U.P.'s unwilling assistance, Fetch catches up to Shane and violently kills him, avenging her brother. Augustine, after hearing that Shane had been executed, states that Fetch is 'ready'.

Alongside Eugene and another Conduit named Hank Daughtry, Fetch is released into the military's custody. During the drive, Hank reveals he has smuggled in a bent paper clip to use it to pick their restraints, hijacking the truck, and crashes it at Salmon Bay. Fetch and Eugene escape, while Hank is left behind as Delsin Rowe approaches him, leading to the events of Second Son.

== Development and release ==
The game began development shortly after the release of Infamous Second Son. Nate Fox said it was an "easy" decision to make First Light. He said protagonist Fetch's "conflicted history and overall attitude made her the perfect fit for a standalone game." Fox also said that making the game was "really fun", and that "everyone already knows how to do everything development-related and the tools are all already in place, so you can go directly to making content." Sucker Punch felt that Fetch's powers were different enough from Second Son's Delsin's powers to warrant a separate game. Even though Fetch's different powers alone provided gameplay variety, during development, Sucker Punch ensured that they felt "fluid" and "very different". Another focus for Sucker Punch was to make the overall tone darker than Second Son. Sucker Punch put Fetch in plenty of harsh situations where she is forced to be herself and fight her way out.

During development, Sucker Punch placed a heavy emphasis on the characterization of protagonist Abigail 'Fetch' Walker. Sucker Punch worked extensively with Fetch's voice actress Laura Bailey throughout the development of the game, often asking for her input in specific situations. The game's director Nate Fox stated: "When it came time to put in dialogue or talk about motivations, we called Laura Bailey or texted her. She would tell me what would be Fetch's view so it was accurate to the character, but also accurate to a woman's experience." After the release of Second Son, Sucker Punch felt "compelled" to make a game about Fetch; Fox stated: "We made a game about Fetch because we liked Fetch."

The game was announced at E3 2014 and was released worldwide digitally via the PlayStation Store on August 27, 2014. It was later released at retail only in Australia, Asia and Europe on September 10, 2014. Players who pre-ordered the game received a bonus costume for protagonist Fetch called "D.U.P. Fetch".

== Reception ==
Reception

Aggregate score
Aggregator	Score
Metacritic	73/100

Review scores
Publication	Score
Destructoid	8.5/10
Eurogamer	6/10
Game Informer	8/10
GameRevolution	4.5/5
GameSpot	6/10
IGN	7.5/10
Polygon	8/10
VideoGamer.com	7/10

Infamous First Light received "mixed or average" reviews from critics, according to review aggregator website Metacritic.

Destructoid's Chris Carter gave the game a positive review. He scored an 8.5 out of 10 and stated: "Full stop, inFamous First Light is more Second Son, which is a good thing. Although I wasn't nearly as invested in Fetch as I was with Delsin's story, this is a great way for fans to return to the super-powered world of Seattle, and an even better way for newcomers to get a taste of the series."

Eurogamer's Dan Whitehead gave the game a mixed score of 6/10 saying: "First Light's weird, limbo nature makes it a hard one to pin down. Considered as a DLC add-on, it's pretty generous and fans of Second Son will certainly appreciate the extra backstory and another chance to romp around Seattle. As a standalone game, it earns points for trimming the fat from the open-world template, but is also as generic as they come. First Light is an adequate diversion for fans but unlikely to dazzle anybody else."

Andrew Reiner of Game Informer gave the game a positive score of 8/10 in his review. He summed up his review by saying: "InFamous First Light lacks some of the punch of Second Son in its campaign battles and familiar narrative marks, but is still a welcome addition to the series. Fetch is a fantastically written character, and the conclusion to her origin story is worth seeing in its entirety – even if you already know what happens. Sucker Punch did a phenomenal job with the finale."

Kevin VanOrd of GameSpot gave the game a 6/10 in his review. He called protagonist Fetch an "engaging heroine", said the "Silky-smooth combat and locomotion make it a pleasure to move around Seattle", and said "blasting Department of Unified Protection guards and digital demons, is an absolute blast". He did however criticize the game for being too easy, saying: "Once you max out your homing missiles you can sleepwalk your way through challenge arenas." He also called the mission design "uninspired" and disliked the characterization and dialogue.

VideoGamer.com's Jamie Trinca scored the game a 7 out of 10, writing: "First Light is Second Son with most of the fat trimmed, making it ideal for newcomers." Trinca had positive comments about protagonist Fetch; he mostly praised the character for not being a generic male who is tasked with saving the world, writing: "I like Fetch. She's infinitely more interesting than Delsin Rowe — she's a flawed anti-hero, who has come to be defined by some extraordinarily bad decisions." Trinca also thought the visuals were among the best on PlayStation 4, and complimented the cheap price, but felt the game lacked variety and featured repetitive gameplay.

Dan Stapleton of IGN gave the game a 7.5 out of 10, praising the challenge maps, the story, the protagonist, Fetch, and the new powers. He summed up his review by saying: "InFamous First Light is a decent story around a better character than Second Son, but its battles don't have the same scale or superpower variety that Second Son's do. After the short campaign, its challenge maps put a new spin on combat by taking away your ability to escape danger on a whim, making it much tougher."

Polygon's Philip Kollar gave Infamous First Light an 8 out of 10 in his review. He said: "Despite how nicely their stories slot into one another, the ideal scenario for playing InFamous First Light is to have never touched Second Son. This works best as an introductory package for newcomers to the Infamous series, a tightly-wound, dramatic story with solid action and very little in the way of excess. It's not different enough from the Infamous game that released earlier this year to totally stand out, but it doesn't suffer much for that similarity."

Daniel Bischoff of GameRevolution gave the game a glowing review. "That inFamous First Light echoes the main game's themes of siblings and what it means to lose family struck me deeply," Bischoff said, "especially as brotherhood has taken on different meanings for me over the years. With it written into the character's backstory, fans might know what to expect; still, I can't help but feel for Fetch above all else. Her imprisonment and Sucker Punch's use of a familiar location at the crux of this story breathe new life into neon-powered gameplay loops that had already proven themselves one of the best open-world mechanics yet." Bischoff scored the game a 4.5 out of 5.

Despite the mixed reception, the Academy of Interactive Arts & Sciences commended the characterization of Abigail "Fetch" Walker with a nomination for "Outstanding Achievement in Character" during the 18th Annual D.I.C.E. Awards.
