= Fetch (Infamous) =

Fetch Abigail Walker
- Infamous character
- First appearance: Infamous Second Son (2014)
- Voiced by: Laura Bailey

In-universe information
- Origin: New Jersey, United States

Abigail "Fetch" Walker is a character from the Infamous video game series developed by Sucker Punch Productions and published by Sony Computer Entertainment. She first appears in 2014's Infamous Second Son as a supporting character, before appearing in the standalone prequel Infamous First Light released later that same year. Voiced by Laura Bailey, she is the third playable protagonist in the Infamous series, following Cole MacGrath and Delsin Rowe. She received mostly positive reviews from critics, with some expressing an opinion that her character is an improvement over Delsin.

== Development ==
The Infamous First Light's director Nate Fox said protagonist Fetch's "conflicted history and overall attitude made her the perfect fit for a standalone game." Sucker Punch felt that Fetch's powers were different enough from Second Son's Delsin's powers to warrant a separate game. Even though Fetch's different powers alone provided gameplay variety, during development, the studio ensured that they felt "fluid" and "very different". Another focus was to make the overall tone darker than Second Son, such as by putting Fetch in harsh situations where she is forced to be herself and fight her way out.

The development team worked extensively with Fetch's voice actress Laura Bailey throughout the creation of the game, often asking for her input in specific situations. Fox stated: "When it came time to put in dialogue or talk about motivations, we called Laura Bailey or texted her. She would tell me what would be Fetch's view so it was accurate to the character, but also accurate to a woman's experience." After the release of Second Son, Sucker Punch felt "compelled" to make a game about Fetch; Fox stated: "We made a game about Fetch because we liked Fetch." Players who pre-ordered the game received a bonus costume for protagonist Fetch called "D.U.P. Fetch".

== Appearances ==
Abigail "Fetch" Walker, a young Conduit in the custody of the Department of Unified Protection (D.U.P.) within the confines of a private prison at Curdun Cay, is ordered to give a demonstration of her powers to D.U.P. Director Brooke Augustine by battling holographic foes created by fellow Conduit Eugene Sims. Once that is done, Abigail is asked to retell the events that led up to her arrest.

Abigail was one of the first of the new Conduits to emerge after The Beast's rampage across the countryside seven years ago, gaining the ability to absorb neon and convert it into energy to be expelled from her body. Despite their best efforts, Abigail's parents were left with few options after she accidentally injured one of her classmates. Brent, Abigail's older brother, ran away with her; the two turned to drug use to cope, but Brent eventually got clean, even hiding Abigail's stash to help her get clean as well. Brent also required Abigail to use her powers sparingly in order to avoid suspicion. He soon fell into a life of crime, hoping to save enough money to purchase a boat so the siblings could start over in Mexico.

Abigail eventually sets out to find Brent when he suddenly vanishes. She meets Shane, an old acquaintance of Brent's and a small-time drug lord; he manipulates Abigail into helping him wipe out the Akurian mafia in a gang war. When they finally locate Brent, Shane kidnaps him and forces Abigail to assist him in consolidating his control over the city's drug trade. Abigail tries to rescue him, but Brent is accidentally killed in the crossfire by one of her energy projectiles. In the present, Augustine speculates that Abigail's new abilities are a result of her coping with extreme trauma. The Director allows Abigail to fight holograms of her "D.U.P. Troops" on the condition that she reveal all of her abilities. Abigail's story continues after the latest challenges are completed.

At the conclusion, Augustine reveals that she has abducted Shane and offers Abigail the chance to avenge her brother. Abigail's "enthusiasm" leads her to blow a hole in the prison wall when she loses control of her power. Shane hijacks an APC and tries to flee for his life with the D.U.P. and the now-freed Abigail hot on his tail. Abigail catches up to Shane and proceeds to disintegrate his body on a molecular level, leaving behind only a shower of blood droplets to float away in the snow. Augustine declares that Abigail is "ready" after learning of Shane's execution.

Abigail is then placed on a prisoner transport alongside Eugene and another Conduit named Hank Daughtry. Hank reveals he smuggled in a bent paper clip to pick their restraints, seizing control of the truck with his smoke-based abilities and crashing it at Salmon Bay during the drive. Abigail, Eugene, and the other conduits escape (except Hank, who remains trapped in the burning truck), while Delsin Rowe approaches the fire, setting the stage for the events of Second Son.

== Critical reception ==
Fetch received positive reviews from critics. Time described Fetch as "relatable", noting that she is part of a wider trend of strong lead female characters in video games which began in the 2000s. Hamza Aziz of Destructoid and Dan Stapleton of IGN both praised the character and its power and claimed that the character is a "badass" and "better than Second Son's". Kimberly Wallace of Game Informer called the character "interesting". She further said that she "like Fetch because she's got moxie and isn't afraid to speak her mind or go with her gut." Wallace's colleague Andrew Reiner further opined that she was the most interesting character from The Second Son, and that she "stole the spotlight with her soulful story and down-to-earth demeanor". Reiner believed that she is a "fantastically written character", and rated the conclusion to her origin story in First Light highly. Jamie Trinca of VideoGamer praised Fetch for not being a generic male character who is tasked with saving the world; she instead a flawed anti-hero who has come to be defined by some extraordinarily bad decisions. Trinca found her "infinitely more interesting than Delsin Rowe”.

Kevin VanOrd of GameSpot called Fetch an "engaging heroine". Daniel Bischoff of GameRevolution claimed that Fetch's neon powers were his favorite element in the game. Laura Francis of Eurogamer claimed that the neon-graffiti segments in the game felt like Fetch was "highly reminiscent of Jet Set Radio". In 2014, Andrew Webster of TheVerge claimed that the character was a PS4 female superhero.
