= Infamous (video game) =

2009 video game

- Developer: Sucker Punch Productions
- Publisher: Sony Computer Entertainment
- Director: Nate Fox
- Composers: Amon Tobin; Jim Dooley; Jonathan Mayer; Mel Wesson
- Series: Infamous
- Platform: PlayStation 3
- Release: NA: May 26, 2009; EU: May 29, 2009; AU: June 4, 2009
- Genre: Action-adventure
- Mode: Single-player

Infamous is a 2009 action-adventure video game developed by Sucker Punch Productions and published by Sony Computer Entertainment for the PlayStation 3. The player controls the protagonist Cole MacGrath, a bike messenger caught in the center of an explosion that devastates several city blocks of the fictional Empire City. The explosion sends the city into chaos while Cole finds himself with new electricity-based super powers. Though the game's story follows Cole as he uses his new abilities to restore some semblance of order to Empire City, the player is given several opportunities to use these powers for good or evil through the game's Karma system. These choices ultimately affect character growth, the reaction of the city's populace towards Cole, and finer elements of gameplay and the story.

Sucker Punch developed Infamous as a change of pace from their earlier Sly Cooper series of stealth-based games, but using a similar comic book-inspired origin story to help the player become more connected with Cole. The game's pacing in the introduction of new super powers and ease of movement about the city by unconventional means were critical factors during development. The desolate urban atmosphere was inspired by comics such as DMZ and Batman: No Man's Land. Amon Tobin was among the artists who helped to compile its soundtrack, which aimed to reflect the environment.

The game was well received by the gaming press. It was praised for many of its elements, including the implementation of Cole's powers and climbing ability, and the game's mission structure. Reviewers commented on the repetitive nature of combat and enemies, limitations of the Karma system, and technical aspects in the graphical display. Infamous was compared to and contrasted with Prototype, a video game released the following month, which had many elements similar to Infamous. The game was offered by Sony as a free download as part of their 'Welcome Back' program, after the 2011 PlayStation Network outage. It is the first entry in the Infamous series and was followed by a sequel, Infamous 2, in June 2011.

== Gameplay ==
The player can use Cole to extract electricity from nearby power sources for later use.

Infamous is an action-adventure game set in an open world environment and played from a third-person perspective where the player controls Cole and primarily interacts with the world of Empire City through Cole's newly gained electricity-based powers; these are used for movement, offense and defense in combat, and either for better or worse in dealing with the citizens of Empire City. In order for Cole to use his powers, he must have stored electrical power, represented by a node meter on the player's heads up display (HUD). The player can recharge Cole by draining electricity from powered sources or from living beings; recharging also restores Cole's health.The game features 16 different electrical powers, ranging from simple bolts that do not consume Cole's energy to wide-field lightning storms that drain most of Cole's energy. The player can use such powers, giving the player options in certain situations. For example, the player may fire at a generator near foes to cause it to explode and cripple his opponents, then restrain them or make enemies attack each other.

Due to being vivified electricity, Cole is unable to use vehicles or touch water. Cole easily climbs buildings and other structures and can fall from a great height without taking damage. Many powers are acquired over the course of the game; once acquired, the player can use experience points, awarded for specific actions, stunts, and missions, to increase the power's effectiveness. The growth of these powers is affected by Cole's current Karma level. Starting in a neutral position, it ranges from Guardian to Champion to Hero on the Good side, and from Thug to Outlaw to Infamous on the Evil side. Certain actions, such as stopping to help injured citizens or draining their health to restore Cole's, will affect the Karma level in either direction. Normal story missions may also alter the Karma level. During the game, the player will encounter Karma Moments when the action pauses and is told, through a monologue by Cole, of two actions to choose from: always a good and a bad option. For example, one scenario the player is presented with is to either pull a valve and get a spray of tar in his face (Good), or force a civilian to do it for him (Evil). There are also a number of paired Good/Evil side missions in the game; completing one will lock out the other mission, but will reward the player with a large amount of Karma towards their selected Karma goal. Completion of these missions helps gain access to unique super powers based on the Karma level. The player is not locked into choosing either Karma path, and may opt to play towards one extreme and later switch to the other mid-game. Doing so will lock out any purchased power(s) in the original chosen Karma sector. In addition to altering Cole's appearance and certain aspects of the game's story, Karma also influences the behavior of the citizens of Empire City, they will come to help Cole in battle if his Karma is Good, but will turn on Cole and throw rocks at him if he has Bad Karma.

Empire City is built on three islands, and the player must work through main story missions on each island before being able to access the next one, though future missions may require the player to return to an earlier island. Each island is divided into a number of sectors, at the start of the game controlled by three different gangs, the Neon District being controlled by Sasha and her Reapers, the Warren District being controlled by Alden Tate and the Dust Men, and the Historic District being controlled by Kessler and the First Sons. The player can undertake a side mission in each sector, once certain main story requirements have been met, to free that sector from gang control by reducing or eliminating its presence in that sector. Other side missions may also unlock medical stations where Cole will re-awaken should he die. Though Cole must travel on foot he eventually gains powers that allow him to grind along power cables and powered, elevated train rails and to hover for a short time. Scattered around the city are hundreds of 'Blast Shards' which Cole can collect to increase the amount of electricity he can store. There are 32 'Dead Drop' satellite transmitters that help to reveal more of the backstory in the game.

== Plot ==
A cutscene from Infamous, showing Cole discovering his new powers with his girlfriend, Trish. The game uses comic book-style cut scenes (similar to ones used in the Sly Cooper series) to extend the superhero motif further.

=== Setting ===
InFamous is set in Empire City, a fictional coastal metropolis connected to the American mainland by a single bridge. The city, inspired by New York City, is spread across three islands, each with its own borough, elevated train system, and power grid. Each island is connected to the others by a network of bridges and tunnels. The boroughs are the Neon District, the city's entertainment and business center decorated by grand Art Deco monuments; the Warren, a run-down residential neighborhood and international shipping hub; and the Historic District, the seat of the city government dominated by old Neo-Gothic and Beaux-Arts skyscrapers. The game opens with a mysterious explosion that decimates several blocks of the Historic District, followed by a viral epidemic that forces the federal government to quarantine the city. A subsequent rise in violent crime overwhelms the city's police force, resulting in societal collapse.

=== Characters ===
The protagonist is Cole MacGrath (Jason Cottle), a bike courier accused of triggering the explosion, which leaves him with the ability to absorb and project electricity. His closest friend, Zeke Jedediah Dunbar (Caleb Moody), allows Cole to hide on his rooftop, despite his envy of the former's powers. Trish Dailey (October Moore), Cole's girlfriend, abandons him out of anger over the death of her sister Amy, while most of Empire City's residents view him as a terrorist. While attempting to escape the city with Zeke, Cole is contacted by FBI agent Moya Jones (Kimberli Colbourne), who offers to clear his name if he helps her find her husband, fellow agent John White (Phil LaMarr). White vanished while investigating a group known as the First Sons, believed to be responsible for orchestrating the explosion.

While working to restore order in the Neon District, Cole encounters Sasha (Jessica Straus), a former member of the First Sons, who, like Cole, is a "Conduit," an individual given powers by the First Sons. Using her ability to control the minds of others via a tar-like substance, she has formed a gang known as the Reapers. Meanwhile, the Warren has been overrun by the Dust Men, an army of homeless militants led by Alden Tate (also Jason Cottle), the original leader of the First Sons, who possesses telekinesis. Kessler (Sam A. Mowry), the true antagonist of the game, is a shadowy figure who controls the First Sons and takes an obsessive interest in Cole and his powers.

=== Story ===
While the basic story of InFamous remains unchanged, whether the player opts for the "Good" or "Evil" karma path, certain story elements vary based on Cole's choices.

While making a delivery in the Historic District, Cole is instructed to open the package. In doing so, he activates a device known as the Ray Sphere, leveling six city blocks, nearly killing him, and granting him electrokinetic powers. Rescued by Zeke and Trish, he teaches himself to control his emerging powers. After Cole uses them in public to fight off a Reaper attack, the locals turn against him when he is accused of triggering the explosion, forcing him into hiding. He and Zeke engineer an assault on the sealed bridge, only to be ambushed by government forces. Separated from his friend, Cole meets Moya, an FBI agent, who persuades him to return and find her husband, John White, who was supposedly tasked with investigating a group called the First Sons. With her help, Cole restores the district's power supply, earning the attention of Sasha, who lures him into her underground lair. Cole defeats her, but the Sons abduct her before he can make her talk. Trapped in the Warren, Cole assists what remains of the police in battling the Dust Men. Alden is arrested and imprisoned, but Zeke's incompetence in guarding him allows the Dust Men to free him and massacre most of the officers. With Alden planning to reactivate the Sphere, the two patch things up and confront him, with Zeke ending up in possession of the Sphere. Giving in to his temptations, Zeke deserts Cole and takes the Sphere to Kessler.

With Alden on a murderous rampage toward the Historic District, Cole defeats him once and for all in a bridge battle. Before jumping in the water, Alden reveals that Kessler exiled him from the First Sons. White, who turns out to be an NSA agent with no connection to Moya, reaches out to Cole and explains that the Ray Sphere is designed to consume bio-energy from thousands of lives and transfer it to a single user, making them a Conduit. During their search for the Sphere, Kessler publicly challenges Cole to stop a series of bombings across the district, ending with him being forced to choose between saving Trish or her colleagues. Regardless of his choice, Cole fails to keep Trish from dying. Determined to avenge Trish, Cole tracks the Sphere to a remote pier, where he must decide whether to destroy it or use it to become even more powerful. Regardless, the Sphere releases the last of its energy, killing John before disappearing into a vortex.

Kessler then challenges Cole to a final fight in the exact location where the game began. Displaying similar, if not superior, powers to the latter, Kessler comes close to killing him, only to be foiled by Zeke. Mortally wounded by a massive energy discharge, Kessler uses his last bit of strength to transmit a message into Cole's brain. In a final twist, Kessler is revealed to be Cole from the future of an alternate timeline. While raising a family with Trish, Future Cole fails to prevent the Beast, a malevolent entity, from destroying humanity. The Beast tracked down and killed Trish and her children despite their attempts to flee. Sending himself back in time, Future Cole, adopting the name "Kessler," seized control of the First Sons, using their resources to prepare his past self for the future to come. Cole denounces Kessler's memory but recognizes that his actions have given his life a new purpose.

Two endings are possible based on what rank Cole holds at the end of Infamous. If Cole defeats Kessler as a Hero, he restores peace to Empire City and is hailed as a savior. Nevertheless, his estrangement from Zeke and Moya (although he reconciles with the former in the second game), coupled with the responsibilities of heroism, leads him to realize that he will always be alone. If Cole is Infamous, he allows Empire City to fully slip into chaos and disregards Kessler's warning about the Beast, believing himself to be the strongest being ever to exist.

== Development ==
Infamous was developed by Sucker Punch Productions, with a team of 60 people working for about three years. Though they could have opted to request the necessary funds from Sony to increase the team size and finish the game in two years, producer Brian Fleming noted that Sucker Punch's iteration-based development approach worked better with a smaller team size.

Infamous came during the end of the development for Sly 3: Honor Among Thieves as the team began to look towards their next game. After spending the last six years on the same stealth game genre with the Sly Cooper games, they wanted to make something that was more "brazen and loud." However, as fans of the "comic book" motif, they decided to develop it in the direction of a superhero game, working with the idea of an origin story that would allow the player to experience the growth of the character. Fleming stated that with the slower development time, they knew they needed to develop the game for the PlayStation 3 and that the work needed to complement their previous game, akin to how Shigeru Miyamoto's The Legend of Zelda series contrasted his earlier Mario series. They also sought a project that would allow them to become familiar with the new PlayStation 3 hardware but had enough commonalities to allow them to bring their previous work on the Sly Cooper series forward.

Director Nate Fox stated that much of the inspiration for the superhero story came from two DC Comics series, DMZ and Batman: No Man's Land. Both center on a city after a large disaster. The series also inspired the crafting of the game's grim take on the superhero genre. Fox further stated that the film Batman Begins was an inspiration for the game. However, any correlation to DC Comics' Static Shock was unintentional. Fox considered his own personal involvement in the Seattle WTO riots of 1999 as influencing the reflection of "spending time in a lawless place" within the game. Grand Theft Auto III was also stated as an influence, in that the team could easily see themselves as superheroes in the open world of Liberty City; similarly, Spider-Man 2 was used as a model to demonstrate what it would be like to move about the city and answer random requests for help alongside regular missions. They had toyed around with a version of the game that they compared to a superhero version of Animal Crossing, and alongside superhero work, the hero would have an alter-ego of property developer to meet the citizens' more common needs, but dropped this and focused solely on superhero activities after about six months of work. The character of Cole was created to be a "kind of an everyman" so that players could then "get into the headspace of what it would be like to be a real human being who has been granted these exceptional abilities". The team also avoided giving Cole an alter-ego or outfitting him with a costume as it would not have reasonably fit in with the character or the game's story.

The story and cut scene animations were created in-house. The plot was originally written by Fox, who had also written most of the Sly Cooper stories, and reviewed by Fleming. As they continued to develop the game, they rewrote pieces of the story to reflect changes in the game, making sure that the story remained enjoyable. As the game became more complex, they brought in Bill Harms, a published comic book author, who had previously written for Supreme Commander and other video games. Harms assisted with the story and in-game dialog in addition to marketing materials. Fleming noted that the second half of the story underwent significant changes in the last nine months of development; for example, when voice actor Caleb Moody voiced the lines for Zeke, he ad libbed additional lines that the team found to be enjoyable, and they reworked the story to incorporate them. The cut scenes were created in a similar format to the comics that the game was influenced by, and used to further extend the atmosphere of the superhero motif. The cut scenes were created by taking 2D art created in Corel Painter and Adobe Photoshop and placing them into artificial 3D stages built in Adobe After Effects to create a pseudo-3D effect that allowed them to play with camera placement and effects, and addition of organic elements such as dust clouds and ink spots.

Darren Bridges, a developer for Sucker Punch, noted that they wanted to make Infamous about "becoming a modern-day superhero", stressing the word "becoming" as the key motivator to show the growth of Cole from a simple bike messenger to someone with god-like powers. This led to instilling a "sense of progress" and growth of the character in all aspects of the game including the story, the progression of the player's powers, and the variation and difficulty in the enemies that the player faced. The team initially brainstormed on what powers that the lead character had, but selected electricity-based powers for two primary reasons. First, the power translated well to a video game context, as it would be easy to conceptualize the aspects of electrical-based powers in terms of video game concepts such as ranged combat. Secondly, electrical-based powers could then be tied to the city that the player would explore, requiring the player to use the city's electricity as fuel, and thus developing a "real relationship with the city".

Initially, the game was more free-form, allowing players to purchase new powers at any point during the game, but the developers found it difficult to create a challenging game on that basis, particularly as they could not design missions calling for specific powers that the player may not have at that time. This evolved into the scheme of presenting new powers to the player over the course of the game, with the developers created guiding rules for which powers were ultimately included in the game and when: the power had to be useful and add something unique to the game, the player would need a chance to use that power immediately after they got it, and the power would need to be enjoyable to use. The team employed frequent reviews of when these powers were introduced to the player as other gameplay elements were added to the game. Not all powers were necessarily offensive; the "postcognition" power, allowing the player to see the psychic echo of a dead person of where they were before their death, was added as the team found there was an element of fun in tracking the echo through the crowded city. Some powers were cut from the game. One power, gained through the Evil karma path, was called "Minionize" and would have allowed Cole to control the minds of civilians and force them to join him in battle. Although the power was "decidedly evil and very fun to watch", the team felt it wasn't useful to the game, though they managed to retain a hint of it in one of the Evil side missions. Though the team had tested each of the core missions individually with the powers that the player would have based on the game's storyboard, they found that play-testers, who played the missions back-to-back, found the game lacked a variety of combat situations. The developers revisited all the combat scenarios from this feedback to alter the combat layouts as well as adding new enemies, a step that Bridges believes the game "benefited greatly" from. The ability to use Cole's electrical powers to ride along Empire City's elevated train rails was a last-minute addition during the last month of development based on a play-tester's suggestion.

Empire City was designed to marry with Cole's new-found superpowers. The city was built with a "crime ecosystem", where petty crimes or calls for help were always occurring outside of the main story, requiring the player to decide to stop to help or not to resolve them. A portion of the team was devoted to implementing the behavior of the citizens of the city and how that behavior would change as the state of the city altered due to the player's actions. Climbing buildings was considered to be an important aspect of the game, both as part of the superhero motif and because it was considered "fun to do", and Sucker Punch set out to make the whole city climbable. Many details of every building have been modeled to allow the player to climb the buildings, "down to the last window frame, lighting sconce and storefront", however, Fox noted that getting the climbing system "just right" was the most challenging aspect of development. One employee was dedicated to making sure the entire city was climbable. Fleming noted that during Infamous's development, both Crackdown and Assassin's Creed, two games with alternative takes on the climbing aspect, were released; the team felt that each of the games' climbing systems had their own strengths and weaknesses. To reflect the nature of change of the city as the player interacts with it—either restoring power or taking it away—the developers created a "deferred shading" rendering engine that would render the effects of moving and damaged light sources.

The Karma system in the game came about as a result of the team wanting to include the "judicious use of power". Fox commented that they wanted to lead the player along a path of doing the harder tasks believing that these actions were the right things to do. However, without the contrast of "evil" tasks that were simpler to complete, there would be no means of motivating the player to be a "selfless hero". The team wanted to encourage players to think about the results of not only large decisions—Karma moments in the game where Cole thinks of which option to select—but also every moment-to-moment action, such as considering the presence of civilians in the area around a battle. They arranged for the first major use of Cole's powers to turn the city's inhabitants against him, to encourage players to consider both sides. In this mission, Cole is given the option to keep a drop-supply of food for himself and his friends or allow the other citizens to share it among themselves; they found that most players would choose the latter, but very shortly after this event, the population turns against Cole due to evidence linking him to the explosion, forcing the player to run or to attack them. Fox compared the Karma dichotomy to the differences in styles of Batman (representing Good Karma) versus the Punisher (representing Evil Karma): the former would use precision attacks to avoid harming innocents, while the latter would hurt anything in his path to complete his goal. To that end, they designed the powers in the game to reflect this nature; powers acquired with Good Karma are more precise, while Evil Karma powers are more destructive.

== Release ==
It was released May 29, 2009 in Europe and on June 4, 2009, for Australia. On December 10, 2010, the "Gigawatt Blade" DLC was made available in the North American PlayStation Store as a free download, while it had previously been added only as a pre-order incentive. The Gigawatt Blades are "unmatched by any other melee weapon in game", but it takes significant amount of power to use.

=== Marketing ===
In March 2009, Sony Computer Entertainment America released a trailer titled "The Beauty of Powers", which was later released on the PlayStation Store. Early copies of Infamous included a multiplayer beta voucher for the then upcoming Uncharted 2: Among Thieves. The beta started on June 3. Anyone who preordered Infamous from GameStop received an exclusive code for the "Gigawatt Blades" power, and those who preordered from Amazon.com received a special Reaper costume for PlayStation Home, while those who downloaded the Infamous demo from the PlayStation Store and completed it received a Cole costume for PlayStation Home on June 18, 2009. Pre-orders from GameCrazy and Best Buy stores came with an early demo released on May 7. Redeem codes were sent via email to several Oceanic PlayStation Network users on May 14. The demo, which includes four missions, was made available to everyone else on 21 May. Infamous was released May 26, 2009, in the United States.

In July 2009, Sucker Punch Productions released an Infamous-themed space in the PlayStation 3's online community-based service, PlayStation Home. This space is modeled after and called the "Abandoned Docks of Empire City", and includes a mini-game based on zapping Reapers with leaderboard tracking and clothing reward items, and a graffiti wall that allows players to create their own graffiti. The Infamous Home space is the first to broadcast media from the game's developer. Outso developed the Infamous Game Space for Sucker Punch Productions.

Two Sackboy outfits, representing both the good and evil Cole, were added as an expansion pack for LittleBigPlanet. Good and evil versions of Cole and Zeke appear as downloadable content for the multiplayer mode of Uncharted 2: Among Thieves. Cole appears as a guest character for the PlayStation Vita and PlayStation 3 versions of Street Fighter X Tekken. Good and Evil Cole appear as playable characters in the PlayStation 3 title PlayStation All-Stars Battle Royale.

Infamous – along with Infamous 2 and Infamous: Festival of Blood – was released on August 28, 2012, as part of the Infamous Collection under Sony's line of PlayStation Collections for the PlayStation 3. In 2012, Sony Computer Entertainment America released the Infamous Collection bundled with a 250 GB PlayStation 3, Uncharted: Drake's Fortune, Uncharted 2: Among Thieves, a PlayStation Plus 30-day free trial, and the entirety of the Infamous 2 DLC.

=== Audio ===
"Stampton Bridge" by Amon Tobin from the Infamous soundtrack
"Stampton Bridge" by Amon Tobin uses a number of the unconventional urban sounds that were employed throughout the soundtrack

The soundtrack is composed by the electronic musician Amon Tobin, composers James Dooley and Mel Wesson, and electric cellist Martin Tillman, under the direction of Sony's music manager, Jonathan Mayer. Tobin was specifically brought on board due to his recent trend of blurring the lines between music and sound design as exhibited in his then-recent album, Foley Room. Instead of using traditional instruments, the team sought to use sounds that results from objects that would be found in an urban environment and using such objects in combination with other instruments used in non-traditional manners; for example, bungee cords were strung alongside a bass drum and strummed, and wire brushes were hit against a suspended tuba. The music was divided between Tobin, who worked on the in-game music, and Dooley who worked on the music for the cinematics; the two worked together to make sure common musical themes were present in both aspects. Tillman was brought in late to the process to add the cello sounds, but the group was so impressed with his work that they remixed already-completed pieces to incorporate his contribution further. Manchester music group, Working for a Nuclear Free City were commissioned by Sony to produce a song for the game. The song was penned "Silent Melody" and was used in one of the game's promotional trailers. The soundtrack was released for digital download from the iTunes Store in May 2009.

No.	Title	Music	Length
1.	"Rabble Rouser"	Amon Tobin	3:15
2.	"Stampton Bridge"	Amon Tobin	4:16
3.	"Meet the Reapers"	Amon Tobin & James Dooley	4:05
4.	"The First Sons"	James Dooley	2:04
5.	"Alden Strikes"	Amon Tobin & James Dooley	3:12
6.	"The Escape"	James Dooley & Mel Wesson	3:02
7.	"Dinner with Sasha"	James Dooley	2:31
8.	"The Courier"	Amon Tobin	4:17
9.	"Secrets Revealed"	JD Mayer & Martin Tillman	2:38
10.	"Rampage"	James Dooley	2:11
11.	"Tent City"	JD Mayer & Martin Tillman	2:47
12.	"Hunt for the Ray Sphere"	Amon Tobin	2:55
13.	"End of the Road"	James Dooley	3:32
14.	"Anything for Trish"	Amon Tobin & Martin Tillman	4:16
15.	"Stranded"	Amon Tobin	4:03
16.	"Mysterious Signals"	JD Mayer	3:00
17.	"The Truth"	James Dooley & Mel Wesson	2:50
18.	"Genesis"	Amon Tobin & James Dooley	4:11
19.	"Pleasant Empire"	James Dooley	2:09
20.	"Silent Melody"	Working for a Nuclear Free City	3:59
21.	"The Rescue"	Amon Tobin	2:46
22.	"The Price"	James Dooley	2:43
23.	"No Protection"	JD Mayer & Martin Tillman	3:15

== Reception ==
=== Critical response ===
Reception

Aggregate score
Aggregator	Score
Metacritic	85/100

Review scores
Publication	Score
1Up.com	A−
Edge	7/10
Eurogamer	7/10
Game Informer	9/10
GameSpot	9/10
Giant Bomb	5/5
IGN	9.2/10
X-Play	5/5

Awards
Publication	Award
IGN	Best Script
PixlBit	Studio of the Year

Infamous received generally positive reviews according to review aggregator website Metacritic. Greg Miller of IGN considered the title to be "one of the best PlayStation 3 games to date". Core to the game's success, according to reviewers, were the basic mechanics of the game. Giant Bomb's Brad Shoemaker considered that Sucker Punch had "nailed the basic gameplay elements", tying all the various aspects of the game together. The mixture of Cole's powers with the Karma elements of the game were also praised. The powers and Karma system were seen to bring difficult choices to how the player approach battles. Both sides of the Karma system were considered to be fun to play. The mission structure was considered a strong asset of the game. According to X-Play's Matt Kiel, the missions forced the player to consider the full extent of Cole's powers through their difficulty but provided "generous" checkpoints to prevent too much frustration with the game. Reviewers cited the variation in side missions and how they related to the main story as positive aspects of the game.

The presentation of Empire City was also considered to be a significant factor of the success of the game. The climbing and grabbing aspect was considered well done and avoided a "frustration-fest" that other games with precision jumping generally bring about, according to Miller. However, some reviewers noted that Cole's climbing ability was too touchy, with the character grabbing onto ledges too greedily, making it difficult to fine-tune jumps. In combination with Cole's other powers, Miller cited the game as having the "most original city-traversal mechanics" for an open-world game. The behavior of the city's population and how that was affected by the player's choice in Karma was also seen as a positive, and as a constant reminder of the game's setting. The game's story, particularly in the second half of the game, was considered to be strong, enhanced by presentation of the cut-scenes. However, the quality of these scenes was seen to negatively highlight the poor animation used for in-game generated cut-scenes and the quality of the voice work; Miller considered Cole's voice to be too gravelly for the character.

The initial hours of the game, before the player started to acquire some of the more potent powers, were considered to be difficult and may be off-putting to some. Tom Bramwell of Eurogamer noted the remainder of the game continues to have some difficult sections, such as sections where the player must defend a moving target against a large number of foes, and considered these to be "repetitive and overlong". Bramwell further commented that the electrical powers in the game are simply electricity-based reimaginings of standard video game weapon archetypes, such as shotguns and sniper rifles, and, with this awareness, leaves the difficulty of the game up to the enemy placement during encounters. The game is also considered to be rough around the edges in technical execution, with the lack of anti-aliasing and occasional "pop-in" rendering, as well as drops in frame rates when there was a significant amount of action on the screen.

Infamous was released a few weeks before Radical Entertainment's Prototype, a game with many similar concepts including a character finding himself with super powers, a large open-world environment that can be traveled by climbing up buildings and gliding about the city, and several other comparisons. This led many game critics to compare and contrast the games. In his sarcastic Zero Punctuation review of Prototype, Ben "Yahtzee" Croshaw (who had initially praised Infamous as "huge, creative and fun,") compared the two games point for point, and determined that he could not tell which was the better game, and challenged the respective studios to "produce the best image of the rival game's main character wearing a women's bra" as a tiebreaker. To his surprise, both development teams rose to the challenge, producing said images, and forcing Croshaw to call it a near-tie, edging out in favor of Infamous, though still noted that, like their games, both images created independently were nearly equal in the assets that they included. This rivalry highlighted the advantages and disadvantages of exclusivity over a multiplatform release. Gaming analysts Jesse Divnich had this to say "Due to near identical game play and quality scores, the Infamous vs. Prototype case study presents interesting data to publishers when considering the sales bump a title could receive by choosing exclusivity over a multiplatform release."

On September 4, 2010, Infamous was ranked fifth in "The Top 25 PlayStation 3 Games" of IGN, stating that "when Infamous was released on PlayStation 3 in the spring of 2009, it quickly became clear that this was unlike any sandbox game anyone had ever played". It was also listed in Tony Mott's 1001 Video Games You Must Play Before You Die.

=== Sales ===
Infamous was released at the end of May, and the game ranked number 5 by selling 175,900 copies in the United States on its opening week, recorded in May 2009 sales according to the NPD Group, and sold 192,700 copies in the United States over the month of June 2009, the 10th highest-selling game that month. In June 2010, Game Informer stated Infamous sold nearly two million copies.

=== Awards ===
IGN nominated Infamous for Best Action Game on the PlayStation 3, and awarded it for Best Story. GameSpot nominated Infamous for Best Action/Adventure game and awarded it for Best Original IP in 2009. The Escapist nominated it for Best PS3 Game. It was nominated for best action game at the British Academy Games Awards. It was nominated for multiple NAVGTR Awards in 2009, winning for "Outstanding Control Precision" and "Outstanding Original Adventure Game". NAVGTR later nominated Infamous for Control Precision of the Decade and awarded it for Original Adventure Game of the Decade. The G.A.N.G. Awards nominated the song "Silent Melody" from the soundtrack, and awarded Infamous the Best Original Soundtrack Album in 2010.

Awards and nominations
Year	Ceremony	Category	Result	Ref.
2009	2009 Spike Video Game Awards	Best PS3 Game	Nominated	
2009	G-Phoria 2009	Best Action Game	Won	
2009	2009 National Academy of Video Game Trade Reviewers (NAVGTR)	Art Direction	Nominated	
2009	2009 National Academy of Video Game Trade Reviewers (NAVGTR)	Character Design	Nominated	
2009	2009 National Academy of Video Game Trade Reviewers (NAVGTR)	Control Design, 3D	Nominated	
2009	2009 National Academy of Video Game Trade Reviewers (NAVGTR)	Control Precision	Won	
2009	2009 National Academy of Video Game Trade Reviewers (NAVGTR)	Game Design	Nominated	
2009	2009 National Academy of Video Game Trade Reviewers (NAVGTR)	Innovation in Game Play	Nominated	
2009	2009 National Academy of Video Game Trade Reviewers (NAVGTR)	Original Musical Score	Nominated	
2009	2009 National Academy of Video Game Trade Reviewers (NAVGTR)	Writing in a Drama	Nominated	
2009	2009 National Academy of Video Game Trade Reviewers (NAVGTR)	Game Original Adventure	Won	
2010	6th British Academy Games Awards	Action	Nominated	
2010	8th G.A.N.G. Awards	Best Original Soundtrack Album	Won	
2010	8th G.A.N.G. Awards	Best Original Vocal Song – Pop	Nominated	
2011	1st Guild of Music Supervisors Awards	Best Music Supervision for a Video Game	Nominated	
