= Infamous: Festival of Blood =

2011 video game

- Developer: Sucker Punch Productions
- Publisher: Sony Computer Entertainment
- Composers: Galactic; Jim Dooley; Brain; JD Mayer
- Series: Infamous
- Platform: PlayStation 3
- Release: NA: October 25, 2011; EU: October 26, 2011
- Genre: Action-adventure
- Mode: Single-player

Infamous: Festival of Blood (Note: Stylized as inFamous: Festival of Blood, or alternatively inFamous 2: Festival of Blood) is a 2011 action-adventure video game developed by Sucker Punch Productions and published by Sony Computer Entertainment for the PlayStation 3. Festival of Blood is an expansion of Infamous 2, but does not require a copy of Infamous 2 in order to play.

The story is set aside from the canon aspect of the Infamous series, being a spoof told by Zeke Dunbar, the friend of protagonist Cole MacGrath, and follows the latter's gradual transformation into a vampire. The game features new characters and powers and a new comic cutscene creation for the main game Infamous 2's user-generated content (UGC), as well as support for the PlayStation Move controller. Unlike previous games, karmic choices are not included due to Cole's vampire state, and it does not penalize the player for killing civilians by drinking their blood. Instead, they serve as a way of replenishing Cole's health when damaged.

Infamous: Festival of Blood was later bundled with Infamous and Infamous 2 as part of the Infamous Collection on August 28, 2012, under Sony's new line of PlayStation Collections for the PlayStation 3. The online services for the game allowing the distribution of player-made missions were shut down on August 31, 2026.

== Plot ==
Zeke Dunbar meets a woman at a bar and talks with her, when she notices a comic book Zeke was reading. The woman is about to leave until Zeke mentions his relationship with Cole MacGrath, persuading the woman to stay and listen as he begins to tell her a story involving Cole during the events of "Pyre Night", a fictional celebration in New Marais.

During the event, Cole investigates a nearby church after hearing screams, rescuing civilians trapped in its crumbling catacombs. As Cole ventures deeper looking for more survivors, he encounters a woman yelling, who is revealed to be a vampire. Cole is then cuffed and dragged to a tomb deep within the church, and awakens on top of the corpse of a vampire known as Bloody Mary. One of the vampires opens up a vein from Cole's neck and drips his blood onto Mary's corpse, awakening her due to its superhuman properties. She then proceeds to bite Cole, drinking his blood and turning him into a vampire, while her youth and powers are restored from Cole's Conduit blood.

When Cole comes to, he realizes his personal weapon, The Amp, is missing, forcing him to create a makeshift wooden stake in order to fight his way out. Having escaped, he realizes, to his horror, that Mary can now invade his mind. She taunts Cole telepathically, saying that by dawn, he will complete his transformation and become her puppet forever. Driven by the need to drink blood, he feeds on a random civilian. At the same time, Mary's followers surface and begin rounding up other civilians, taking advantage of Pyre Night to blend in. Seeking a solution, Cole contacts Zeke and both begin researching Pyre Night, the celebration commemorating the burning of Bloody Mary by the vampire hunter Father Ignatius centuries ago. They eventually find out the folklore surrounding Father Ignatius, including a weapon he crafted to kill vampires, the Barbed Cross.

Cole goes to Ignatius's grave to retrieve the weapon, but finds that the vampires have already claimed it. Using his finely-tuned vampire senses, Cole is able to identify the vampire who stole it, but he does not have it either. Desperate, Cole heads towards Bloody Mary's tomb, believing it to be there. Instead, he discovers a plot by the vampires to set fire to the surface of New Marais with white phosphorus bombs, as well as mementos kept by Bloody Mary detailing her past.

According to the mementos, Mary was once a governess to a wealthy family until she contracted a fatal case of smallpox. Her admirer, a vampire named Marco, turned her to save her life, and the two went to Europe to start new lives. One night, they were ambushed by Ignatius and Marco was killed, cursing Mary to remain a vampire for all eternity. Enraged, Mary established her own clan and traveled to New Marais, where she terrorized the inhabitants until Ignatius captured her and she was burnt alive.

Realizing the power of the cross, Cole and Zeke set out to retrieve it. Upon finding it, the two storm the church, with Cole holding off Mary and her forces while Zeke plants the phosphorus bombs he stole earlier. As the morning sun rises, Cole struggles to escape the church as Zeke detonates the bombs, destroying Mary and her clan. Her death frees Cole and he returns to normal.

Back in the present, Zeke finishes his story. The woman refuses to believe him until Cole arrives, needing Zeke's help to retrieve The Amp from a pool. The woman follows Cole to help him out and thanks Zeke for "informing" her before revealing herself to be a vampire, much to his shock.

== Reception ==
Reception

Aggregate score
Aggregator	Score
Metacritic	78/100

Review scores
Publication	Score
Eurogamer	6/10
GameSpot	7/10
GamesRadar+	4/5
Giant Bomb	4/5
IGN	7.5/10
Push Square	8/10

Infamous: Festival of Blood received "generally positive reviews", according to review aggregator website Metacritic.

At the time of release, the game was the number one downloaded game on the PlayStation Network, and was the number two downloaded game of November 2011. According to PlayStation Blog, Festival of Blood was the fastest-selling PlayStation 3 downloadable game launched on PlayStation Network at the time. The record was later surpassed by Journey.
