= Infamous (series) =

Video game series by Sucker Punch

- Logo used for the first two games
- Developer: Sucker Punch Productions
- Publisher: Sony Computer Entertainment
- Platforms: PlayStation 3 PlayStation 4
- First release: Infamous; May 26, 2009
- Latest release: Infamous First Light; August 26, 2014

Infamous (stylized as inFAMOUS) is a series of action-adventure video games developed by Sucker Punch Productions and published by Sony Computer Entertainment for PlayStation 3 and PlayStation 4. The series follows the adventures of Cole MacGrath, Delsin Rowe and Abigail "Fetch" Walker, super-powered "Conduits" who must decide their own destinies of becoming either good or evil.

The series consists of three main games: Infamous, Infamous 2 and Infamous Second Son, alongside expansion titles Infamous: Festival of Blood and Infamous First Light. In 2011, a six-issue comic book series was published by DC Comics.

== Plot ==
The series takes place in the present-day United States with real and alternate versions of real cities, such as the setting of Infamous, Empire City, which resembles New York City; and the setting of Infamous 2, New Marais, which resembles New Orleans (Infamous: Festival of Blood also takes place in this city). Washington, D.C. is occasionally mentioned, and Infamous Second Son takes place in Seattle. It features American government agencies such as the FBI, NSA and DARPA, along with agencies fabricated for the series, such as the Department of Unified Protection (DUP), an agency with the sole purpose of stopping conduits, now labeled "bio-terrorists", from causing mass destruction similar to what was caused by Cole MacGrath.

== Gameplay ==
In the first two games, the player controls Cole MacGrath; in the third game, the player controls Delsin Rowe; in the standalone expansion First Light, they control Fetch. The player freely roams around the city, while fighting crime or creating havoc along the way. Cole and Delsin can use their parkour skills to jump and climb buildings throughout the city, along with their powers to help them fight enemies. Their powers come from a gauge which depletes whenever they uses various attacks, and refills when they absorb electricity, smoke, neon, video or concrete from nearby sources.

Morality, or "Karma", is a major factor in the gameplay and storyline. The player is able to control the course of the game by having Cole and Delsin use their powers for good or evil. The choice allows the player to have a different mixture of abilities, as both good and evil have their own set of powers. The game also uses a Karma meter which changes based on the main character's actions throughout the game and determines whether he eventually becomes a good or evil character.

== Games ==
Release timeline
2009	Infamous
2009	Infamous: Precinct Assault
2010
2011	Infamous 2
2011	Infamous: Anarchy
2011	Infamous: Festival of Blood
2012	Infamous Collection
2013
2014	Infamous Second Son
2014	Infamous First Light

Aggregate review scores
Game	Metacritic
Infamous	85/100
Infamous 2	83/100
Infamous: Festival of Blood	78/100
Infamous Second Son	80/100
Infamous First Light	73/100

=== Main games ===
- Infamous is the first game in the series, released in 2009 to positive reviews. Set in 2009, the game introduces Cole MacGrath, a bike courier, who gained his electrical-based superpowers after surviving a large explosion in Empire City caused by the package he was carrying containing the Ray Sphere. The Ray Sphere is an object of great power as it is able to consume the energy of the people around the user and transfer that energy to the user, making him immensely powerful at the cost of thousands of lives. After the explosion, the city was quarantined by the government causing organized crime groups within the city to seize control of Empire City from the local authorities. The game follows Cole's journey to obtain the Ray Sphere in order to escape from the quarantine as part of a deal he made with an FBI agent during his failed escape attempt at the start of the game. Cole eventually obtains the Ray Sphere and the player is given the choice to either destroy it or use it. Regardless of the choice, Cole will eventually come face to face with Kessler, the leader of The First Sons, the organized crime group in the city who had seized control of the city after the quarantine. Kessler duels Cole in a battle to the death and it is eventually revealed after Kessler is mortally wounded that he is in reality a version of Cole from the future of an alternate timeline. Kessler reveals his motive for the events throughout the game telling Cole that he was preparing Cole for an eventual battle against an entity known as "The Beast" who had destroyed Kessler's world. He had set the events of the game into motion by ordering the construction of the Ray Sphere as well as passing it to Cole for him to cause the explosion. The game ends when Kessler dies and Cole proclaims, "When the time comes, I will be ready."
- Infamous 2 is the second game in the series, released in June 2011. Set a month after the events of the first game, Infamous 2 follows the adventure of Cole once again as he escapes to the city of New Marais after the events of the first game to prepare himself for the eventual battle with "The Beast", a powerful being that obliterated Empire City and much of the U.S. Eastern Seaboard. New Marais was the location for the construction of the Ray Sphere and where Cole believes he will find more answers to the events of the first game. However, the city has been taken over by the Militia, who are controlled by an influential industrialist, while the city is being rampaged by beings known as the corrupted who became mutated by the leader of the Militia. The Militia's goal is to keep anything mutated or with superpowers out of the city which unfortunately includes Cole. Thus he must traverse the city fighting against both the Militia and the Corrupted to learn more about Kessler, the Ray Sphere and "The Beast".
- Infamous: Festival of Blood is a downloadable side story for Infamous 2. Set during the events of the main game, the game sees Zeke telling the story of what happened to Cole during Pyre Night to an attractive woman while sitting in a bar. Cole goes underneath St. Ignatius' Cathedral and is bitten by a vampire, and only has until morning to kill the vampire that bit him, Bloody Mary, or he'll be her slave forever. The game takes place all during the night, and introduces new elements, like flight, into the game. User-generated content (UGC) remains, but UGC from Infamous 2 and vice versa cannot be accessed. The Karma System was replaced by a blood meter, which fills as Cole drinks blood from civilians or stake vampires. It was originally rated Mature by the ESRB for its copious amounts of blood, which was eventually trimmed down to a minimum, giving it a teen rating. The game was released in October 2011, and was the bestselling PlayStation Network game, until the launch of Journey.
- Infamous Second Son is the third game in the series, released in March 2014. Set seven years after the events of Infamous 2, the game introduces a new character, Delsin Rowe, a graffiti artist who absorbs the power from other prime conduits. After an encounter with Henry "Hank" Daughtry, he absorbs Hank's smoke and fire powers. Another prime conduit, Augustine, attacks the residents of Delsin's hometown, leading Delsin and his brother Reggie to go to Seattle to find Augustine, absorb her concrete power, and save the Akomish back home.
- Infamous First Light is a standalone expansion to Second Son, released in August 2014. Set two years before the events of Second Son, the game follows the story of Abigail "Fetch" Walker and her neon powers. Fetch had an accident with her powers that changed her life, hating drug dealer Shane for tricking her. Due to this, she was incarcerated in Curdun Cay Station and trained by Brooke Augustine so that she could "learn how to control" her powers. While practicing, she escapes and ventures off, hunting Shane.

=== Web browser games ===
- Infamous: Precinct Assault is a browser Flash game. It was released on May 22, 2009, to promote the first game in the series, Infamous. The game is a 2D side-scrolling platform game played from a third person perspective. Unlike the main games, players must choose whether they want to use their powers for bad or for good before the game starts. The game consists of three levels.
- Infamous: Anarchy is a spin-off game on Facebook, released to promote the upcoming Infamous 2 on June 1, 2011. The game allows players to make a custom avatar, build their own city, help friends expand their cities, fight enemy players, and others. The game has since been updated with more features such as screenshot taking and competition among players. When players reached an unknown criteria, they are rewarded with a code that can be used to unlock additional items in Infamous 2.

=== Infamous Collection ===
Infamous Collection cover art

The Infamous Collection is a collection of Infamous, Infamous 2, and Infamous: Festival of Blood, bundled together as part of Sony's line of PlayStation Collections for PlayStation 3. The collection, along with the God of War Saga and the Ratchet & Clank Collection, were the first releases in Sony's line, being released on August 28, 2012, in North America. The games feature the same features as their original releases. In addition to the games, the collection features bonus content, including extra missions, additional character costumes, power ups and weapon styles.

=== Other appearances ===
Cole appears a playable character in the PlayStation 3 and PlayStation Vita versions of Street Fighter X Tekken (2012), and as both his good and evil forms in PlayStation All-Stars Battle Royale (2012). The series is also referenced in the PlayStation 5 game Astro's Playroom (2020) with one of the game's robots dressed as Cole, mimicking his Induction Grind ability. The characters Cole MacGrath, Delsin Rowe, and Fetch are similarly referenced as robots in Astro Bot (2024).

== Other media ==
=== Comics ===
The Infamous comic is a six-issue mini-series, released bi-monthly between May and July 2011. It was published by DC Comics, in association with Sucker Punch, to coincide with the release of the second game in 2011. The comics take place in between the events of the first and the second game, showing how Cole escapes from Empire City to New Marais. The comic series was written by William Harms, one of the writers for the original game, and drawn by Eric Nguyen, with covers drawn by Doug Mahnke and Ed Benes. In 2009, a graphic novel titled Infamous: Post Blast was released on IGN, which serves as a prequel to the main events of Infamous. The graphic novel had four chapters, each focusing on Cole MacGrath and John White trying to survive in the quarantined Empire City immediately after the blast. The story of Infamous: Post Blast takes place between the first two missions of Infamous: Introduction and First Glimpse.

=== Film ===
In 2009, Sony had chosen screenwriter Sheldon Turner to adapt Infamous into a feature film in a seven figure deal. Brothers Ari and Avi Arad were hired to produce, and Sony executives Matt Tolmach and Jonathan Kadin as handlers for the studio. Turner told The Hollywood Reporter he was excited that the game had a "big idea and a character arc", which he believed was "the future of gaming". He believed the game was essentially "a love ballad to the underachiever". As of 2026, no updates on the film adaptation have been made.
