= Grind (sport) =

Sliding stance performed in some sports

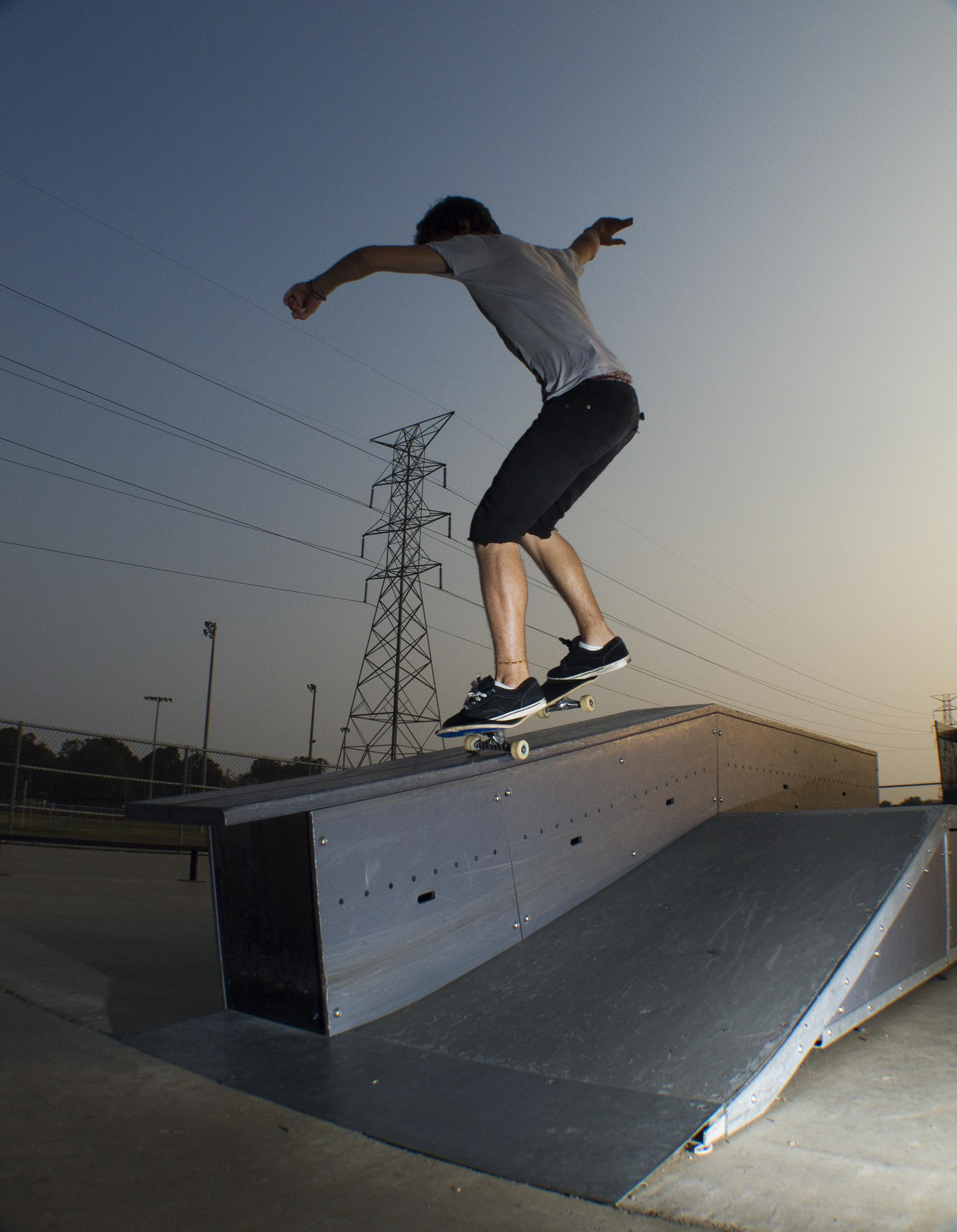
Frontside nosegrind

Grinding is a sliding stunt performed in various sports such as skateboarding or inline skating. It involves sliding the body, rather than rolling the wheels, of the skate or board against the supporting surface.

== See also ==
- Grinds (skateboarding)
- Grinds (skating)
