= Kevin Miller (voice actor) =

American voice actor (born 1977)

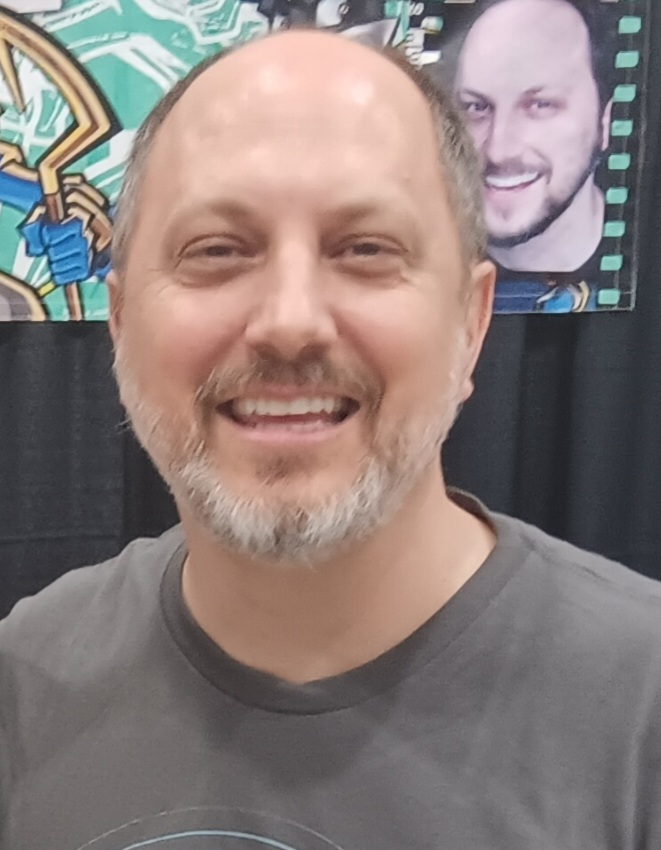
- Miller in 2023
- Born: December 21, 1977 (age 48); Minot, North Dakota, U.S.
- Education: San Jose State University (BFA)
- Occupations: Voice actor; comedian; writer; podcaster; teacher; live streamer; gamer; YouTuber
- Years active: 2000–present
- Spouse: Katherine Smethurst (m. 2010)
- Children: 2

Twitch information
- Channel: THEKevinMiller
- Years active: 2018–present
- Genres: Gaming; voice acting; storytelling; community interaction
- Followers: 4.5K

YouTube information
- Channel: THEKevinMiller21
- Years active: 2012–present
- Genres: Gaming; voice acting; community interaction
- Subscribers: 2.78K
- Views: 99K
- Last updated: December 16, 2025
- Website: thekevinmiller.com

Kevin Miller (born December 21, 1977) is an American voice actor, comedian, writer, podcaster, teacher, live streamer, gamer and YouTuber, known for his role as the voice of Sly Cooper, the main character in the video game series of the same name.

== Early life ==
Kevin Miller was born in Minot, North Dakota on December 21, 1977.

== Career ==
Miller began his voice acting career in 2000, he was cast as the voice of Sly Cooper in the 2002 video game, Sly Cooper and the Thievius Raccoonus. Miller has since reprised the role in its follow up sequels, Band of Thieves, Honor Among Thieves and Thieves in Time. He would also voice the character again in PlayStation Move Heroes, PlayStation All-Stars Battle Royale and Bentley's Hackpack.

He has also directed voice recording sessions for several video games companies, such as Sega, Namco, The Learning Company, Sony, Paramount and others. He also performs in live action as an improvisor within the comedy groups ComedySportz and Unscriptables and is the co-host of the Second Funniest Podcast, now known as The Gamerland Podcast. Outside of acting, Miller is also a voice-over teacher, he would offer teach private coaching for newcomers who want to get into voice acting.

== Personal life ==
Kevin Miller has been married to his wife Katherine, since 2010. Together, they have two children.

== Filmography ==
=== Film ===
Year	Title	Role	Notes
2013	Sly Cooper and the Gang in 'Timing Is Everything'	Sly Cooper (voice)	Short film

=== Television ===
Year	Title	Role	Notes
2013	Geex	Narrator (voice)	Episode: "Pilot"
2021	Archibald's Next Big Thing	Bonk (voice)	Episode: "Switched! / Free Range Chickens"

=== Video games ===
Year	Title	Voice role	Notes
2000	Soliloquy Learning Assistant	Narrator	Educational game
2000	Tales of Destiny II	Reid Hershel	English version
2000	Jet Set Radio	Noise Tanks	
2001	Forever Kingdom	Boss	English version
2002	Magic Pengel	Mono	English version
2002	Men in Black II: Alien Escape	Coffee Worms	
2002	Jet Set Radio Future	Noise Tanks	
2002	Crazy Taxi 3: High Roller	Angel	
2002	Sly Cooper and the Thievius Raccoonus	Sly Cooper	
2002	Shinobi	Additional voices	English version
2002	The House of the Dead III	Daniel Curien	Uncredited
2002	Magic Pengel: The Quest for Color	Mono	
2003	Virtua Cop 3	James	
2003	Nightshade	Onibi	English version
2004	Carmen Sandiego: The Secret of the Stolen Drums	Cole Gannon	
2004	Blood Will Tell	Tahomaru	English version
2004	Sly 2: Band of Thieves	Sly Cooper	
2004	Echo Night: Beyond	Additional voices	English version
2004	Ace Combat 04: Shattered Skies	Additional voices	English version
2005	Virtua Quest	Sei, Dot	English version
2005	Scooby-Doo & the Scary Stone Dragon	Terrance Walker	
2005	Sly 3: Honor Among Thieves	Sly Cooper	
2011	PlayStation Move Heroes	Sly Cooper	
2012	PlayStation All-Stars Battle Royale	Sly Cooper	
2013	Sly Cooper: Thieves in Time	Sly Cooper	
2013	Bentley's Hackpack	Sly Cooper	
2015	Kragos the Dishonored	Pong	
2018	Dynasty Warriors 9	Soldier	English version
2025	PaperKlay	Nox	

=== Live-action ===
Year	Title	Role	Notes
2006	The War That Made America	Revolutionary War Soldier	Episode: "Unintended Consequences"
2015	Kragos the Dishonored	Pong	Short film

=== Web ===
Year	Title	Role	Notes
2008–present	Second Funniest Podcast/The Gamerland Podcast	Himself/Co-host	
2025	The Adventures of the Fox in the Fedora	Cassie's Father	Episode: "Dead and Back Again"

== Writing credits ==
Year	Title	Position	Notes
2010	Just Like Me	Story	Short film
2013	Day of the Midnight Dragons	Story	Short film
2015	Last Out	Co-writer	Short film
2015	Stipulations	Co-writer	Short film
2016	Stonewood	Co-writer	Short film
2017	Succeeding Is Believing	Co-writer	Short film
2018	Ed, Joy and Dr Malloy	Co-writer	Video
