= Sly Cooper =

Series of action stealth video games

- Genres: Stealth; Action-adventure
- Developers: Sucker Punch Productions (2002–2005); Sanzaru Games (2010–2013)
- Publisher: Sony Computer Entertainment
- Creator: Sucker Punch Productions
- Platforms: PlayStation 2; PlayStation 3; PlayStation Vita; iOS; Android
- First release: Sly Cooper and the Thievius Raccoonus; September 23, 2002
- Latest release: Bentley's Hackpack; February 5, 2013

Sly Cooper is a series of stealth action-adventure video games created by Sucker Punch Productions and owned by Sony Interactive Entertainment. The series follows the adventures of Sly Cooper, an anthropomorphic raccoon and master thief, along with his two partners in crime, Bentley the turtle and Murray the hippopotamus, all of whom are pursued by Sly's love interest, Inspector Carmelita Fox. Sanzaru Games developed the fourth game and remastered the original PlayStation 2 trilogy for the PlayStation 3 and the PlayStation Vita in a compilation titled The Sly Collection.

Sly Cooper himself has become one of the most popular PlayStation video game characters, and has appeared in other Sony games such as crossover titles PlayStation Move Heroes (2011) and PlayStation All-Stars Battle Royale (2012).

== Common elements ==
=== Gameplay ===
A screenshot from Sly Cooper and the Thievius Raccoonus, showing Sly hiding from a guard. The blue lights to the left indicate Sly's thief senses, in this case, a wall that he can slide against.

The games are primarily in third person. The player controls Sly or one of his companions through a series of missions across several levels, relying primarily on stealth to avoid enemies and alarms while collecting treasure and other items. Sly is very agile, and is able to use many of the features of the architecture for stealth, indicated to the player by a blue glow, explained in-game as a visible manifestation of Sly's "thief senses." For example, Sly can perch on the top of sharp points, climb up pipes, sneak along a narrow ledge, walk across a tightrope, zipline down a rope, or use his cane to swing from hooks. Sly also uses his cane to defeat foes, although it makes a noise that may attract other foes. He prefers to use sneak attacks when possible because of his limited endurance. Due to his heritage, Sly has a number of special moves that he learns through the games that can also increase his stealth or speed, or allow him to eliminate foes silently. The player also may play as Bentley with his gadgets, or Murray with his strength, and many minor companions in the third game. There are also mini-games scattered throughout the gameplay.

Each game is broken into a series of heists, and to accomplish the heist, Sly and his gang must complete several missions. In the first game, each mission was located on a level accessed from the main hub level, while the second, third, and fourth games used a non-linear, open-world approach to have various missions located around the same large level. There is typically a boss fight at the end of each heist as the conclusion to the mission.

=== Setting and characters ===
The Sly Cooper series takes place in a fictionalized version of the real world populated by anthropomorphic animals, with film noir and comic book motifs as well as the presence of super-science and magic. The main protagonist, a young adult raccoon named Sly Cooper, is the latest descendant in a line of master thieves. The Cooper Clan is notorious for only stealing from other thieves, and passes down their expert techniques from generation to generation in a book called the "Thievius Raccoonus." While the Coopers have accumulated a massive hoard of wealth, Sly places greater value on his friendship with his partners-in-crime, whom he met growing up in an orphanage together: Bentley, a turtle who acts as brains of the gang; and Murray, a hippo, who acts as the brawn and the getaway driver of the team van. The trio, known as the Cooper Gang, perform elaborate heists across the world, often taking down large and dangerous organized crime groups. On their travels they are pursued by Sly's love interest, Inspector Carmelita Fox of Interpol.

==== Major characters ====
Render of Sly Cooper as he appears in Thieves in Time.

- Sly Cooper (voiced by Kevin Miller) is an antiheroic young adult gentleman thief raccoon. He is part of a long line of master thieves who specialize in robbing other criminals rather than innocent people, making them vigilantes. As a child, he witnessed the violent murder of his father at the hands of a group known as the Fiendish Five. They stole the Thievius Raccoonus, which holds the secrets of the Cooper clan's master thief moves. He was forced into an orphanage, where he met his best friends, Bentley and Murray. Sly is the nimblest member of the gang and performs the most missions. He uses a hooked cane, a family heirloom, as a multi-purpose tool. Sly is cunning and extremely athletic and can perform feats such as walking on wires, landing on small points, sliding on vines, and falling from great heights. He is also able to disguise himself in order to access restricted areas and is a competent fighter.
- Bentley (voiced by Matt Olsen) is the brains of the gang. He is a turtle who is skilled with computers, gadgets, and explosives, and generally helps with reconnaissance and mission planning while Sly is out in the field. In Sly 2, Bentley decides to help out in the field, but later on his legs are injured under the jaws of Clock-La, so he is forced into a wheelchair, which he equips with gadgets; he has since become more relaxed and confident in his abilities and himself. It is also stated that he co-constructed a time machine along with his ex-girlfriend, Penelope, which serves as the key object in the third and fourth games. He is the current guardian of the Thievius Raccoonus, having been entrusted to him by Sly.
- Murray (voiced by Chris Murphy) is the muscle of the gang and Sly's full-time wheelman and part-time burden, in charge of driving the Cooper Gang's van to various locations. As a large pink hippopotamus, he is very strong. He often ventures to the field on missions requiring such strength. When Bentley is injured in Sly 2, he blames himself and leaves the gang to the Australian Outback, looking for a more peaceful state of mind, but eventually returns when Bentley is attacked by Italian crime mob leader Don Octavio, one of the Cooper Gang's enemies. It is stated that he has developed a more serious personality, though he remains a happy-go-lucky hippo.
- Inspector Carmelita Montoya Fox (voiced by Roxana Ortega in Sly 1, Alesia Glidewell in Sly 2, Ruth Livier in Sly 3, Grey DeLisle in Sly 4 and PlayStation All-Stars Battle Royale) is a member of Interpol, as well as Sly's main complicated love interest. She is a red fox who has her mind set on capturing Sly and his crew, but also demonstrates romantic feelings for him, which Sly often uses to escape capture at the last minute. In the fourth game, Carmelita begins to help out the Cooper Gang by aiding them in recovering the disappearing pages of the Thievius Raccoonus. This is when she begins to soften up and develop feelings for Sly. She uses a shock pistol as her weapon of choice, which contains powerful blasts and a target lock.

==== Recurring characters ====
- Clockwerk (voiced by Kevin Blackton) is the main antagonist of Sly 1 and the posthumous overarching antagonist of Sly 2. He is a Eurasian eagle-owl who was turned into a cyborg after being initially fueled by his hatred and jealousy for the Cooper Clan and their reputation as great thieves. Determined to outlive the Coopers and eventually wipe them all out, he replaced his body with machinery so that he could live much longer than any normal being. He was first defeated in the Krak-Karov Volcano in Russia by Sly at the end of the first game, but his body survived the lava and was placed in the Cairo Museum, where it was stolen by the Klaww Gang, setting up the events of Sly 2. Although Clockwerk himself does not actually appear in the second game, the parts of his body are the driving force behind the Cooper Gang's actions, taking down the Klaww Gang to retrieve all of them and ultimately destroy them. But the parts ultimately end up in the hands of the Klaww Gang's leader, Arpeggio, and Clockwerk is rebuilt before Neyla joins herself with the Clockwerk frame to become "Clock-La." However, the new Clock-La was short-lived and defeated shortly afterward by Sly and Carmelita.
- Muggshot (voiced by Kevin Blackton) is a lilac-colored American Bulldog who is one of the supporting antagonists of Sly 1, featured in the second level. He grew up as the runt of the litter, regularly picked on by the bigger dogs. Inspired by watching gangster movies, he eventually decided to work out in order to grow as strong as possible so that he could defeat all the bullies and never be picked on again. However, due to being entirely focused on brawn, he conversely did little to advance his knowledge and is thus notoriously unintelligent. He was defeated by Sly in the first game and arrested, briefly seen in issue #2 of the comics as an inmate at Heathrow Prison, before returning for the third game, where he was a supporting villain in the third episode. It is revealed that after escaping jail, Muggshot became a highly trained and lethal pilot in the annual ACES Competition, run by the Black Baron, where his team was the runner-up in the previous year and the current year. Bentley deduced that, in order for the Cooper Gang to have a better chance at beating the Black Baron, Muggshot had to be removed from the competition. Thus, Bentley tricked Muggshot into running into Carmelita, who defeated and arrested him. He returned once more in the animated promotional short for the fourth game, "Timing is Everything," where he stole an antique golden watch, but was once again thwarted by the Cooper Gang and arrested by Carmelita.
- The Panda King (voiced by Kevin Blackton) is a panda and one of the supporting antagonists of Sly 1, featured in the fourth level. He grew up fascinated with the art of fireworks, but when he attempted to present his own fireworks to the noblemen, they rejected him due to his poor social status. He gained revenge by using fireworks as tools for destruction and ran an extortion ring of robbing small villages under the threat of burying them alive in avalanches caused by fireworks before Sly defeated him. Later, when Bentley determined that they needed someone with knowledge of more powerful explosives for the Cooper Vault job in Sly 3, he recommended the Panda King. Sly at first vehemently refused - as the Panda King had been involved in the brutal murder of his parents - but Bentley convinced him that there was no other choice. The Panda King agreed to join them if they first helped rescue his daughter from General Tsao, who had kidnapped her and planned to marry her. They succeeded, and after the Cooper Vault job, the Panda King returned to China.
- Dimitri Lousteau (voiced by David Scully) is a French marine iguana who speaks in slang. He started out as a young painter whose unique art style was heavily criticized and rejected by the artistic community, forcing him to turn to forgery before opening a nightclub on the west side of Paris. His first role in the series was as a supporting villain in the second game, as the first member of the Klaww Gang to be defeated by the Cooper Gang. He later returned in the third game, beginning his role as a supporting protagonist after he joins the Cooper Gang to help them with the Cooper Vault job. He returns for a much smaller role in the fourth game, left with the duty of guarding their Paris hideout and the Thievius Raccoonus while they travel through time, and thus only appears in the cutscenes.
- Penelope (voiced by Annette Toutonghi) is a Dutch mouse, one of the supporting protagonists of Sly 3, and the secondary antagonist of Sly 4. Bentley eventually discovered her online while researching potential pilots and mechanics that the team might need for the Cooper Vault job in Sly 3. She challenged them to impress her by defeating her boss, the Black Baron, only to find that Penelope was the Black Baron. Defeated and exposed, she joined the gang and eventually formed a romantic bond with Bentley, after initially being attracted to Sly. However, she turned against them in the fourth game after she came to believe that Sly and his values of "honor" were a bad influence on Bentley, believing that she and Bentley together could rule the world through weapons design and trade. Thus, she joined forces with Cyrille Le Paradox, with the promise of eventually defeating Sly and getting Bentley all to herself. After her second disguise, the Black Knight was exposed, Bentley was initially devastated by her betrayal, but eventually came to terms with it and defeated her in combat, using one of her own mechanical suits against her. Although she was initially arrested and placed in a maximum security prison like the rest of the villains, she was the only one who escaped, under mysterious circumstances. Bentley notes in the epilogue that she has been committing a wide variety of crimes all over Europe, leaving her calling card at the scene of each crime and that he has also been receiving mysterious postcards from her, hinting at her possible return in the future installment.

== Development ==
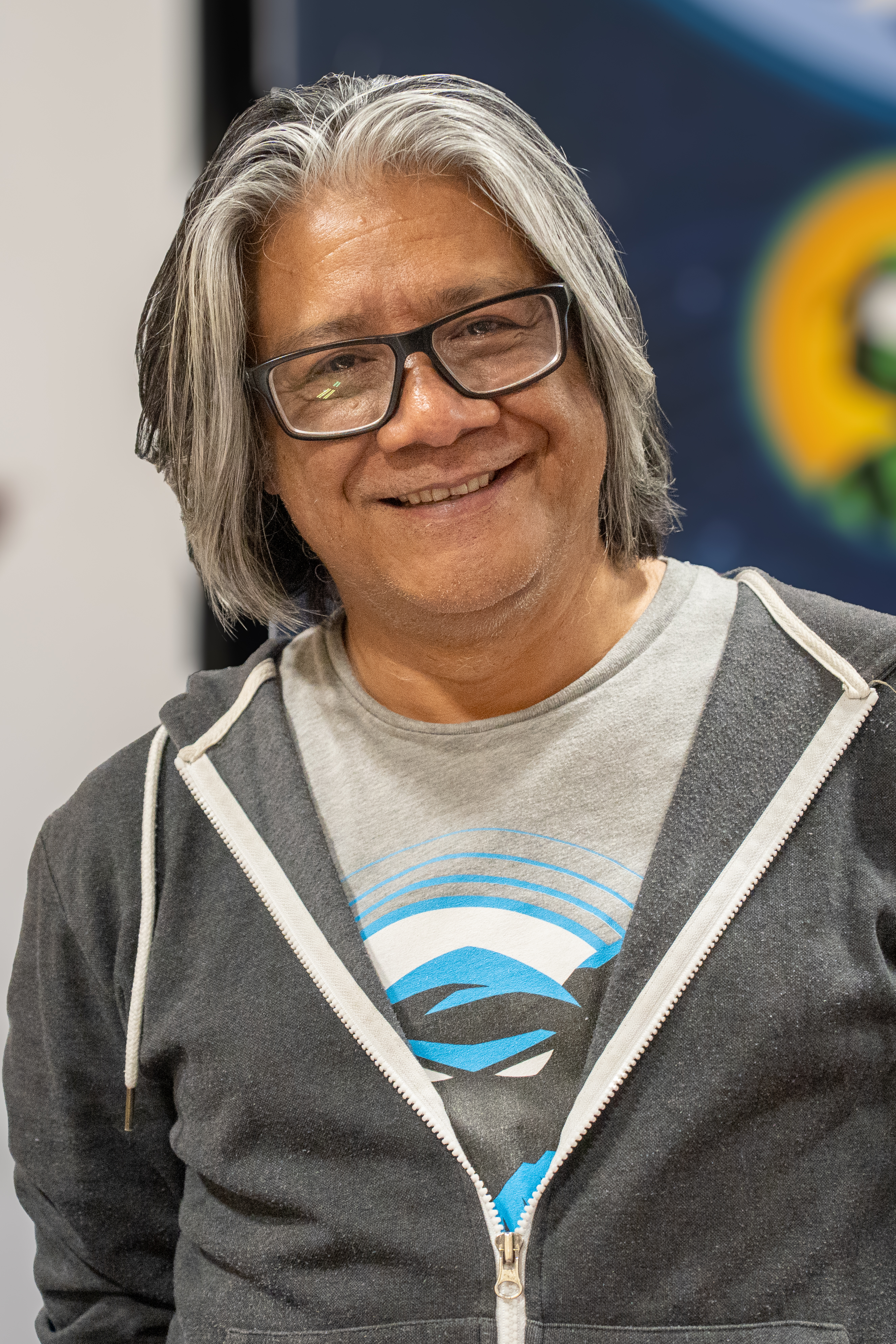
Dev Madan at Comic Con Oakland 2026

Sly Cooper was illustrated by Scott Steinberg with art direction by Dev Madan. The first concept of Sly was to be a thief. Scott Steinberg made different designs such as a pillow or alien, each with a different personality. The choice to make him a raccoon was settled when the development team found it humorous for a raccoon to wear a thief mask. During the design stage, different staff members of Sony gave different inputs leading Scott Steinberg to make multiple designs that filled an entire folder. Sony of America wanted him to be "cool", Sony of Japan wanted him to be "cute", and Sony of Europe wanted him to be "Dark" and "Edgy". The original name for Sly was "J.T." which stood for "Jewel Thief", but was scrapped when Sucker Punch discovered it could be confused with Japan Tobacco.

== Games ==
Release timeline
2002	Sly Cooper and the Thievius Raccoonus
2003
2004	Sly 2: Band of Thieves
2005	Sly 3: Honor Among Thieves
2006
2007
2008
2009
2010	The Sly Collection
2011
2012
2013	Sly Cooper: Thieves in Time
2013	Bentley's Hackpack

=== Mainline games ===
==== Sly Cooper and the Thievius Raccoonus (2002) ====
Sly Cooper and the Thievius Raccoonus, released as Sly Raccoon in PAL regions, was released in 2002 for the PlayStation 2. Sly and the gang are looking for the missing pieces of Sly's family book, the Thievius Raccoonus, which contains all of the Cooper Clan's secret thief techniques. They trace it to the Fiendish Five, a rival gang led by a giant mechanical owl named Clockwerk. Sly and his gang must steal back the book while keeping ahead of Interpol's Inspector Carmelita Fox, who promises to put Sly in jail for his crimes.

==== Sly 2: Band of Thieves (2004) ====
Sly 2: Band of Thieves was released in 2004 for the PlayStation 2. After the events of Sly Cooper, the mechanical parts from the destroyed Clockwerk are stolen by the Klaww Gang. Together, the parts could be used to revive Clockwerk; separately, they each have special functions and are used for various crimes by the individual gang members. Sly and the Cooper Gang are pursued by Carmelita and her new partner, Constable Neyla, while they track down the missing Clockwerk parts.

==== Sly 3: Honor Among Thieves (2005) ====
Sly 3: Honor Among Thieves was released in 2005 for the PlayStation 2. On a remote island, Sly discovers the Cooper Vault, a gigantic cache of wealth accumulated by his family over the years. In order to gain access he must defeat a villain known as Dr. M, who has taken over the island and made many failed attempts to break into the vault. Sly must regroup his old partners and recruit new members, defeating a variety of new villains along the way, in order to succeed at reclaiming his family's history, all while still on the run from Carmelita. This game also has some levels that can be put into 3D mode and the PS3 version in The Sly Collection (2010) allows the full game to be played in 3D.

==== Sly Cooper: Thieves in Time (2013) ====
Sly Cooper: Thieves in Time was officially announced during Sony's 2011 E3 Keynote, and was officially released on February 5, 2013. Sly Cooper and the whole gang return with an epic brand new adventure for the PlayStation 3 and the PlayStation Vita systems. The pages of the Thievius Raccoonus are disappearing and Bentley, now the keeper of the ancient book, must round up the gang and save the Cooper Clan legacy from being destroyed forever. With Bentley's newly-invented time machine, the gang and Carmelita travel back in time to stop the various henchmen of the main villain, Cyrille Le Paradox, who is determined to replace the Coopers as the new master thief of the world. Along the way, the gang teams up with several of Sly's ancestors, all while Sly must deal with the aftermath of Carmelita discovering that he had faked his amnesia at the end of the previous game. The game was developed by Sanzaru Games, the same development team behind The Sly Collection, instead of Sucker Punch Productions, who turned their focus to the Infamous series. If players unlock the game's secret ending, a clip is shown that hints at a potential future installment in the series, but on November 14, 2014, Sanzaru Games released a statement that they are not developing a future game.

=== Compilation ===
==== The Sly Collection (2010) ====
The Sly Collection (titled The Sly Trilogy in PAL regions) is a remastered port of the first three games in the series, released in November 2010 for the PlayStation 3 on a single Blu-ray disc as a Classics HD title. The games were ported by Sanzaru Games and published by Sony Computer Entertainment America. On November 29, 2011, The Sly Collection was released as a digital download on the PlayStation Store, with each title in the collection available as a separate purchase. The collection also includes a set of minigames. On May 27, 2014, the collection was released for the PlayStation Vita. Sly 1 and 2 are featured on the game card, while Sly 3 is accessed through an included download voucher.

For the remastering, all three games have had a graphics overhaul to allow them to support modern 720p resolution. When in 3D mode the games run at 30 frames per second, while in normal mode, the games run at 60 frames per second. All three of the games also have trophies, with one platinum each. PlayStation Move supported mini-games and 3D support are available in the Collection, as well as trophies. Upon completing every game in the Collection, the Sly Cooper: Thieves in Time ("Sly 4") teaser trailer is unlocked.

However, these features are not available in the downloadable version.

Developer Sanzaru Games impressed Sony with a demo for the then-unannounced Sly Cooper: Thieves in Time, and was subsequently tasked with porting the series' PlayStation 2 titles to the PlayStation 3. At this time, the games' original developers, Sucker Punch Productions, were working on the inFamous series. The Sly Collection was announced in June 2010, and released on November 9, 2010. It was made available on the PlayStation Store on November 29, 2011. On April 20, 2013, the PlayStation Vita port of the collection was revealed after it was rated by the ESRB. It was officially announced on February 10, 2014, with a release date of May 27, 2014.

=== Mobile game ===
==== Bentley's Hackpack (2013) ====
Bentley's Hackpack is a collection of the various hacking mini-games found in the main campaign mode of Thieves in Time, with additional levels, challenges, and prizes. It was developed by Sanzaru Games and was released for PlayStation 3 and PlayStation Vita alongside Thieves in Time. This game is a part of Sony's cross-buy initiative, allowing purchasers of the PlayStation 3 version of the game to receive a free copy for the PlayStation Vita via the PlayStation Network. The game was released for the PlayStation 3 and PlayStation Vita in 2013. A port to iOS and Android was released in 2014.

It received 7/10 from Destructoid.

== Related media ==
=== Print ===
A children's book titled Sly Cooper: To Catch a Thief was published by Scholastic Corporation on January 31, 2007. The novel was written by Michael Anthony Steele and the plot takes place in between Sly Cooper and the Thievius Raccoonus and Sly 2: Band of Thieves.

=== Possible film and television adaptations ===
==== Film adaptation ====
Production on a Sly Cooper film originally leaked in 2012 when a NeoGAF user discovered listings for a number of Sony Interactive Entertainment franchises in a film financing database. The project was officially announced by producer Brad Foxhoven, of Blockade Entertainment, on January 28, 2014. Sly Cooper is Blockade's third adaptation of a Sony video game series, after Heavenly Sword and Ratchet & Clank. Alongside a teaser trailer, the initial announcement revealed that Ratchet director Kevin Munroe and animation studio Rainmaker Entertainment would be helming the movie set for release in 2016. Also like Ratchet & Clank, the film is financed by Film Financial Services with lead investor Jiangsu Broadcasting Corporation from China along with Rainmaker, with international representation by Cinema Management Group. Commenting on the film's production, Asad Qizilbash, senior director of first party games marketing at Sony stated: "As one of our most storied and fan favorite PlayStation franchises, we are excited to see the story of Sly premiere on the big screen for the first time. "We have a great partnership with Rainmaker and Blockade Entertainment and we're looking forward to seeing Sly reimagined in a full-feature movie to offer both fans and newcomers alike a chance to become reacquainted with one of our most beloved heroes." Series creator Sucker Punch Productions is involved with the film.

David Wohl, vice president of development at Blockade Entertainment and producer on the movie, was quoted as saying the film won't be an origin story: "Sly and the gang are already together, though they are far from being so great at what they do." The story will focus on Sly, Bentley, and Murray, but Carmelita and Clockwerk will also be included.

Unlike prior incarnations of the franchise which used cel-shading, the film is going for a contemporary CG art direction. Foxhoven stated that "the global film market can lean towards pure CG animated films. As much as we love the cel-shaded look of the game, we felt that it would not be held up on the big screen collectively." He also said that working with the creators of Sly Cooper would help the movie's look "remain true to the artistic style of the characters and world."

At WonderCon 2016, Munroe stated that the film had yet to enter production and that he doubted it would be released later that year, but was "standing by, waiting to jump on top of it. I'm just waiting for the phone call." On October 26, 2016, he revealed on Twitter that he hadn't personally worked on Sly Cooper in over a year and a half.

In September 2016, Michael Hefferon, president and chief creative officer of Rainmaker, said that due to Ratchet's failure, the company would have to reevaluate the timing, release plans, and budget for Sly Cooper. In 2017, Rainmaker left the project.

==== Television series adaptation ====
On June 14, 2017, Sony Interactive Entertainment announced that they were developing a Sly Cooper television series alongside Technicolor Animation Productions, with PGS Entertainment handling brand management. The series was to consist of 52 11-minute episodes, with half scheduled to premiere in October 2019, and the remaining in July 2020, though the broadcast network was never determined.

On May 20, 2019, Sony Interactive Entertainment announced that they had opened a film and TV production studio on the Sony Pictures Entertainment lot in Culver City, California called PlayStation Productions, which will develop and produce projects based on the company's catalog of more than 100 games. Sony Pictures will distribute these projects, but Sony Interactive Entertainment will handle production firsthand. This announcement had many fans speculate that the Sly Cooper television series would be moved to the studio, considering that projects such as Sony Pictures' Uncharted film also moved there.

== Reception ==
=== Critical ===
Aggregate review scores
Game	Year	Metacritic
Sly Cooper and the Thievius Raccoonus	2002	86/100
Sly 2: Band of Thieves	2004	88/100
Sly 3: Honor Among Thieves	2005	83/100
The Sly Collection	2010	(Vita) 80/100 (PS3) 85/100
Sly Cooper: Thieves in Time	2013	(Vita) 75/100 (PS3) 75/100

=== Sales and accolades ===
Sly 1 was a nominee for GameSpot's 2002 "Best Game No One Played on PlayStation 2" award. By July 2006, Sly Cooper and the Thievius Raccoonus reached 800k units sold in the United States with the Sly trilogy selling a total of 2.2 million units. Next Generation ranked it as the 78th highest-selling game launched for the sixth generation of video game consoles between January 2000 and July 2006 in that country. GameSpy considered Sly Cooper to be the 5th most underrated game of all time in a 2003 listing.

Sly 2: Band of Thieves frequently appears on all-time lists of PlayStation 2 games, ranking number 23 by GameSpy and SVG.com, number 24 by IGN, and appearing on unranked features by Digital Trends, and VG247. Jesse Lab, writing for The Escapist in 2022, argued the series maintained its true identity by the second game, moving past the rigid platforming tropes, such as simply getting to the end of the level, for open-world gameplay with various missions and tasks to complete.

It is also considered unique from most other video games, particularly stealth and action-adventure games, for its Saturday morning cartoon nature, humor, lightheartedness, and caper-centric gameplay. IGN's PlayStation 2 ranking, one of the features hold this opinion, already celebrating the series for its distinct combination of family-friendliness with stealth and "genuinely funny" comedy. Gameplay centered around scenarios similar to those in heist films, like Ocean's 11 (1960) and The Italian Job (1969), are commonplace in realistic open world crime video games, most notably the Grand Theft Auto series (1997–present). Commemorated USgamer's Jeremy Parish, it is a rare heist video game to successfully balance requirements and liberty when it came to heists. They are required to be completed to progress to others, but the player had control over how to do so.

== In other media ==
PlayStation Move Heroes, announced at E3 2010, is a crossover between the Sly Cooper series, Jak and Daxter and Ratchet & Clank. It features Sly and Bentley as playable characters. The game uses PlayStation Move. It was released on March 22, 2011, in North America.

Sly Cooper appears as a playable character in the crossover fighting game PlayStation All-Stars Battle Royale. In the game's arcade mode, Sly finds that several pages from the Thievius Raccoonus have been stolen and begins battling the other fighters in an attempt to locate them, including a rival battle with Nathan Drake. The Sly Cooper version of Paris also appears as one of the game's stages. Additionally, Bentley assists Sly with his Level 3 Super attack, Murray appears as an unlockable minion and as part of Sly's Level 1 Super attack, and Carmelita appears as a downloadable minion and stage hazard in the "Alden's Tower" stage.

Sly appears as an Easter egg in Ratchet & Clank: Rift Apart, in which the RYNO 8 weapon can open dimensional rifts that bring characters and objects from other PlayStation franchises into the game.

Ghost of Tsushima, also developed by Sucker Punch Productions, includes several Sly-themed cosmetic items; equipping the required set unlocks the hidden "Cooper Clan Cosplayer" trophy.
