= Bentley's Hackpack =

2013 video game

- Developer: Sanzaru Games
- Publisher: Sony Computer Entertainment
- Composer: Peter McConnell
- Series: Sly Cooper
- Platforms: PlayStation 3 PlayStation Vita iOS; Android
- Release: NA: February 5, 2013; AU: March 28, 2013; EU: March 28, 2013; iOS, Android; January 17, 2014
- Genre: Action
- Mode: Single-player

Bentley's Hackpack is a 2013 minigame compilation video game developed by Sanzaru Games and published by Sony Computer Entertainment for the PlayStation 3 and PlayStation Vita. It was developed to promote and coincide with the North American release of Sly Cooper: Thieves in Time on the same date by Sanzaru Games. Players take control of Bentley and have access to three of the arcade machines at Bentley's Arcade, which feature more challenging versions of the three hacking minigames in Thieves in Time.

The game is available for both the PlayStation 3 and PlayStation Vita via the PlayStation Store. This game is a part of Sony's cross-buy initiative, allowing purchasers of the PlayStation 3 version of the game to receive a free copy for the PlayStation Vita via the PlayStation Network. It was also released on iOS and Android in 2014, the first time an existing Sony game was ported to mobile phones.

== Gameplay ==
Three arcade machines are available to play on: System Cracker, Alter Ego, and Spark Runner. Each arcade features 20 stages, each of which has five challenges for the player to beat (for a total of 300 challenges). Each challenge awards one token, and bonus tokens are sometimes awarded by unlocking certain levels; with each arcade machine awarding a maximum of 111 tokens. The tokens can be used to unlock the 65 prizes at Dimitri's Prize Gallery, which bears similarities to the Treasure Wall at any Hideout in Thieves in Time. The tokens are not spent, but each prize goes up in the number of tokens required.

Unlocking the final prize will let the player use a secret arcade machine, which is actually a hidden entrance to the basement of Bentley's Arcade. In here, the Cooper Gang perform a concert to the metal version of the theme song of Thieves in Time as the credits show on screen.

== Plot ==
Characters such as Sly Cooper, Murray, Carmelita, El Jefe, and flashlight guards from Sly Cooper: Thieves in Time hang out at Bentley's Arcade in modern Paris on their off-time, suggesting that it is non-canon.

== Development ==
Sly Cooper: Thieves in Time was planned to be released sometime in the fall of 2012, but Sony pushed the date back to February to give it ample room to release instead of in the middle of a crowded season. By September, Thieves in Time was complete and ready to be shipped, so Sanzaru began working on Bentley's Hackpack in secret.

== Reception ==
Bentley's Hackpack received 7/10 from Destructoid and 73/100 from Official PlayStation Magazine Benelux.
