= Sly 2: Band of Thieves =

2004 video game

- North American box art
- Developer: Sucker Punch Productions
- Publisher: Sony Computer Entertainment
- Composer: Peter McConnell
- Series: Sly Cooper
- Platform: PlayStation 2
- Release: NA: September 14, 2004; PAL: October 29, 2004
- Genres: Stealth, action-adventure
- Mode: Single-player

Sly 2: Band of Thieves is a 2004 stealth action video game developed by Sucker Punch Productions and published by Sony Computer Entertainment for the PlayStation 2. It is the second installment of the Sly Cooper series, and the sequel to Sly Cooper and the Thievius Raccoonus (2002).

In Sly 2: Band of Thieves, players primarily control the titular protagonist Sly, who pursues the Klaww Gang to recover and destroy the remainig pieces of Clockwerk, the antagonist of the original game. Gameplay is similar to the first game, but features various improvements, including a health meter for characters, modifications to combat, a mission hub world, and revamped gameplay for side characters Bentley and Murray. Characters can improve their abilities using power-ups and skill upgrades which can be unlocked by opening safes in each world, purchased by collecting coins, or and purchasing them from safehouses via ThiefNet.

Sly 2: Band of Thieves received positive reviews, with critics praising its graphics, cel shaded art style, story, music, and gameplay, and considered it a significant improvement over the first game. It has been frequently ranked as one of the best PlayStation 2 games of all time. It was followed by Sly 3: Honor Among Thieves in 2005, and was remastered in 2010 alongside it and its predecessor for the PlayStation 3 by Sanzaru Games as The Sly Collection. Alongside its successor, it was digitally re-released for PlayStation 4 and PlayStation 5 in 2024.

== Gameplay ==
=== Premise ===
Like its predecessor, Sly 2: Band of Thieves is a stealth action-adventure video game. It follows the Cooper Gang, raccoon Sly Cooper, turtle Bentley, and hippopotamus Murray, who try to collect the pieces of the antagonist robot owl that was destroyed in the first game, Clockwerk. They have been stolen from the Interpol police department by Klaww Gang, its members using them for illegal get-rich-quick schemes.

The player simultaneously acts as three characters (Sly, Murray, and Bentley) where, in each open world, they pull off several small character-specific heists that build into one large heist. The gameplay is also freeform, where the player can perform other activities, such as looting from guards, from the mission currently assigned. This differs from the first game, where the player only controls Sly to get to the end of each level. Many heists only require one character, but some are collaborations. Examples including Bentley jumping into Murray's arms in order to be thrown onto a tower's ledge, or Sly stealing keys from a truck for Bentley to drive.

Interpol's Carmelita Montoya Fox continues trying to catch the Cooper gang while being infatuated with Sly; similar to the previous game, Sly 2: Band of Thieves opens with her chasing Sly. She is now assisted by Constable Neyla, who grew up poor in New Delhi, India, before using persuasion skills to enter and garner high grades at a British university; Interpol recently hired her to use them for infiltration into criminal institutions. The Contessa, a leading prison warden and criminal psychologist, has also been hired by the police department for her hypnotherapy techniques, which have been successful in deincentivizing criminal behavior.

Sly 2: Band of Thieves is double the length of its predecessor, lasting eight stages and five worlds. Each world has a Klaww Gang member leading a criminal organization or family within it as its boss. Dimitri is a celebrity in the underworld of Paris, France, forging popular paintings in revenge to classmates that criticized his works done at his art college. Jean-Bison is in Canada extracting natural resources, such as chopping down trees, to tame "the Wild North". He utilizes a train system spanning across the nation's plains to import goods for the Klaww Gang. He had previously been frozen for 100 years as a result of an avalanche he faced while taking opportunity of the Klondike Gold Rush (1896–1899), thus alienating him from society. Rajan, born poor in India, has committed to a life of crime throughout his whole life, such as working for the gang, in order to increase his standing in the nation's social hierarchy. The parrot Arpeggio, who frequently attends opera houses in London, England, is inspired by his inability to fly to develop his skills as a mechanic, and serves that role for the gang. In Prague, the Czech Republic, is the Contessa's criminal rehabilitation center.

=== New elements ===
Several new gameplay elements are introduced. Guards now pop out at random moments, and execute one of two types of behavior depending on the geometry of the part of the level they are standing on. They also have more advanced artificial intelligence (AI), being able to climb up pipes, meaning Sly can still be hit by them even when already on a rooftop. Additionally, the guards do not catch the player character simply by seeing them, but rather if a display on the screen and sound cue indicates it. Enemies include the wild boars in Paris, and elephants in India.

Sly, Bentley and Murray have different abilities that the tasks required utilization of one or more of. Bentley, who plans missions and contributes technical skills to the group, follows a more cloak and dagger approach to stealth. He can't climb poles or jump very far, but he is equipped with a sleep-dart crossbow and countdown bombs to defeat enemies or sabotage enemy equipment. Bentley can use his computer skills to hack villains' computers, bringing the player to a top-down shooter-like minigame. Murray serves as the gang's brawn, with punches and belly flops. His brute strength allows him to take on groups of strong enemies by himself with powerful hooks and uppercuts. He can pick up objects and enemies to throw and his "thunder flop" attack can stun and destroy enemies. His strength allows him to help the gang with heavy-duty tasks.

Unlike the first game, where a life is lost if Sly was noticed by a guard or injured once, Sly 2: Band of Thieves provides the playable character multiple hit points. Each character has a health bar and a special bar. Health is diminished every time the character is attacked or hits a hazard. If it is depleted entirely, the player must restart any current mission and respawn at another location. The orange special bar depletes whenever a character uses a powerup. If the special bar hits zero, powerups can not be used. Some powerups are required in order to complete certain missions. Both bars (health and special) can be refilled by obtaining health pickups that are in the shape of a red cross, which are found behind destructible objects like boxes and tables. Murray has the most health, while Bentley has the least.

Missions are now connected to a main hub of the location Sly and the Gang are operating. A safe house located in the hub is where the player can choose which character to use and get away from pursuing guards. The hub can range from a city to a logging camp in the wilderness. Enemies do patrol around this area, although on occasion, it's a secluded spot. Characters can explore the hub world freely, or begin a mission at certain locations. Sly detects the points at which a new heist begins with an interactive mask.

Sly has new moves when it comes to stealth, such as sneaking behind two enemies to kill them in one combo move that involves a throw, and pickpocketing. When Sly sneaks up behind an enemy, he can reach out with his cane and grab coins, rubies, rings, diamonds, and other valuable objects out of the enemy's pocket. Once Sly gets all of their coins, he can grab the enemy's item and sell it later back at the safe house for a bunch of coins.

Most power-ups and extra moves are now bought from the safe house instead of being found in safes. Using collected coins, Sly can buy power-ups for each character from an in-game online store, ThiefNet. The store has smoke grenades that cost 300 coins, and the new moves cost more than 1,000. Sly's power-ups focus on stealth, Murray's power-ups on brawn, and Bentley's power-ups on technology. Some of Sly's new moves are one that costs 1,600 coins giving him the ability to move past traps and slowly sneak him enemies. Power-ups for Bentley include a hover pack that allows him to fly and an adrenaline rush that increases his speed. For Murray, there are explosives for his jump attacks. Most power-ups need to be assigned to a button, but some provide passive bonuses. Characters can unlock special upgrades by opening safes. To open a safe, the characters must determine the code to unlock it by collecting all the clue bottles hidden in the present hub world. Certain very valuable items can be found in the world and can be stolen and then sold at the safe house for a large amount of money; these valuables can range from portraits to vases.

The game makes use for the optional USB microphone for the player to use the sound of their voice to distract and attract in-game enemies. This, in turn, adds a new twist to the stealth elements, as the player has to refrain from noises such as talking or coughing to avoid creating in-game noise.

== Plot ==
Two years after the defeat of Clockwerk, (Note: As depicted in Sly Cooper and the Thievius Raccoonus (2002).) Sly Cooper, Bentley and Murray break into the national history museum in Cairo, Egypt to steal and destroy Clockwerk's remains so he can never return. However, the gang realizes in the heist that the Clockwerk parts have already been stolen. Carmelita Fox shows up and accuses Sly of stealing the parts, but her new assistant, a Bengal tiger named Constable Neyla, suggests that Cooper's crew was not behind the theft, but that it was the work of the Klaww gang. After a quick getaway, they begin their investigations into the Klaww Gang and begin to hunt them down.

The first member of the Klaww Gang is Dimitri, a misunderstood marine iguana artist who owns a nightclub in Paris, France. Dimitri uses Clockwerk's tail feathers to print money. After a series of jobs, Sly defeats Dimitri and steals the feathers. Dimitri is arrested by Carmelita, while Sly and the gang escape. The second member of the Klaww gang is Rajan, a powerful Bengal Tiger from India who possesses Clockwerk's wings and heart. After obtaining the wings, Rajan flees with the heart into the jungle. After obtaining the heart in a fight, Sly and Murray are trapped and arrested along with Rajan by the Contessa, who runs a hypnosis prison in Prague, the Czech Republic. Bentley immediately heads to the prison, where he learns that the Contessa (a black widow spider) is actually a secret member of the Klaww gang, who hypnotizes the prisoners to tell them where their loot is. He then manages to get Sly out and, after a series of jobs, Murray is set free. After a lull, they chase the Contessa to her castle where, despite a small fight between the Countess and Neyla, they steal Clockwerk's eyes; the Contessa is later arrested by Neyla.

After surviving the prison, the gang follows Rajan's shipments to sail north to Canada. Here they encounter another member of the Klaww gang, Jean Bison, an American bison who was frozen in the mid-19th century but brought back to life by global warming. The group plans to steal Clockwerk's stomach and lungs possessed by Bison, who uses them as engine parts to power his trains. After stealing all the parts, the gang escapes the scene. The gang follows Bison to a land of cut trees, where he has a sawmill. At this location, Clockwerk's claws are hidden, using them to cut down trees. The gang challenges him to a series of contests in which they cheat. Bison discovers this and flees to freedom. Bison later tells them that he came across the Clockwerk parts in the gang's lair and sold it all to Klaww gang leader Arpeggio, as well as forcing the judges to give him a score of ten during the competition under the threat line (which was why he always won). With Sly's help, Bentley defeats Bison in a brawl, where the area is covered with traps that Sly controls from Bentley. Murray manages to make a way out for the gang.

Through the air, Sly infiltrates the main airship where Clockwerk's parts are being reassembled, and finds that Neyla has been working directly for Arpeggio (a parrot). In front of Arpeggio, Sly discovers that his airship has been turned into a huge transmitter that is going to unleash a hypnotic light of hate on Paris (with its population that has been susceptible to hypnosis as a result of Dimitri's work), a huge wellspring of hate will be produced that Arpeggio will channel by being inside Clockwerk, causing him to become immortal. Suddenly, just before Arpeggio enters Clockwerk, Neyla pushes Arpeggio aside and enters Clockwerk herself. She kills Arpeggio, merges with Clockwerk and names herself Clock-La, and flies away. The gang begins to disable the aircraft's engines to weaken Clock-La. They then send a signal to Carmelita who has agreed to help, and arrives at a helicopter. They engage in a final firefight with Clock-La, which then crashes the main engine of the aircraft and wrecks the fortress and the takeover of the Northern Light battery, where Bentley and Murray are inside. Sly makes his way back to the battery after Northern Light collapses. Clock-La is then unable to move. Murray opens Clock-La's head, so Bentley can finish her off by planting bombs in her head and then removing the Hate Chip, the center of Clockwerk's power. As it exits the mouth, Clockwerk's beak falls and crushes Bentley's legs. Murray saves him, but Bentley is now paralysed and unable to walk. The gang makes a quick exit after Clockwerk's body explodes.

Carmelita arrives with her helicopter and puts the gang under arrest, but not before destroying the Hate Chip, causing Clockwerk's parts to be destroyed forever and killing Neyla for good. Sly turns himself in, in exchange for letting his friends go because of both Bentley's injuries and that they are in a position to make a quick getaway, to which Carmelita agrees. During the helicopter ride to the station, Sly and Carmelita begin to talk amiably, discussing their past adventures, as well as personal hobbies and tastes. The conversation ends abruptly when Carmelita suddenly realizes the flight has lasted more than two hours instead of just a few minutes. Carmelita goes to the front of the helicopter to inspect, only to discover that the helicopter is in autopilot mode, leaving enough time for Sly to parachute out. Carmelita then shouts at Sly from the helicopter, stating that she will eventually find him.

== Development ==
=== Production and design ===
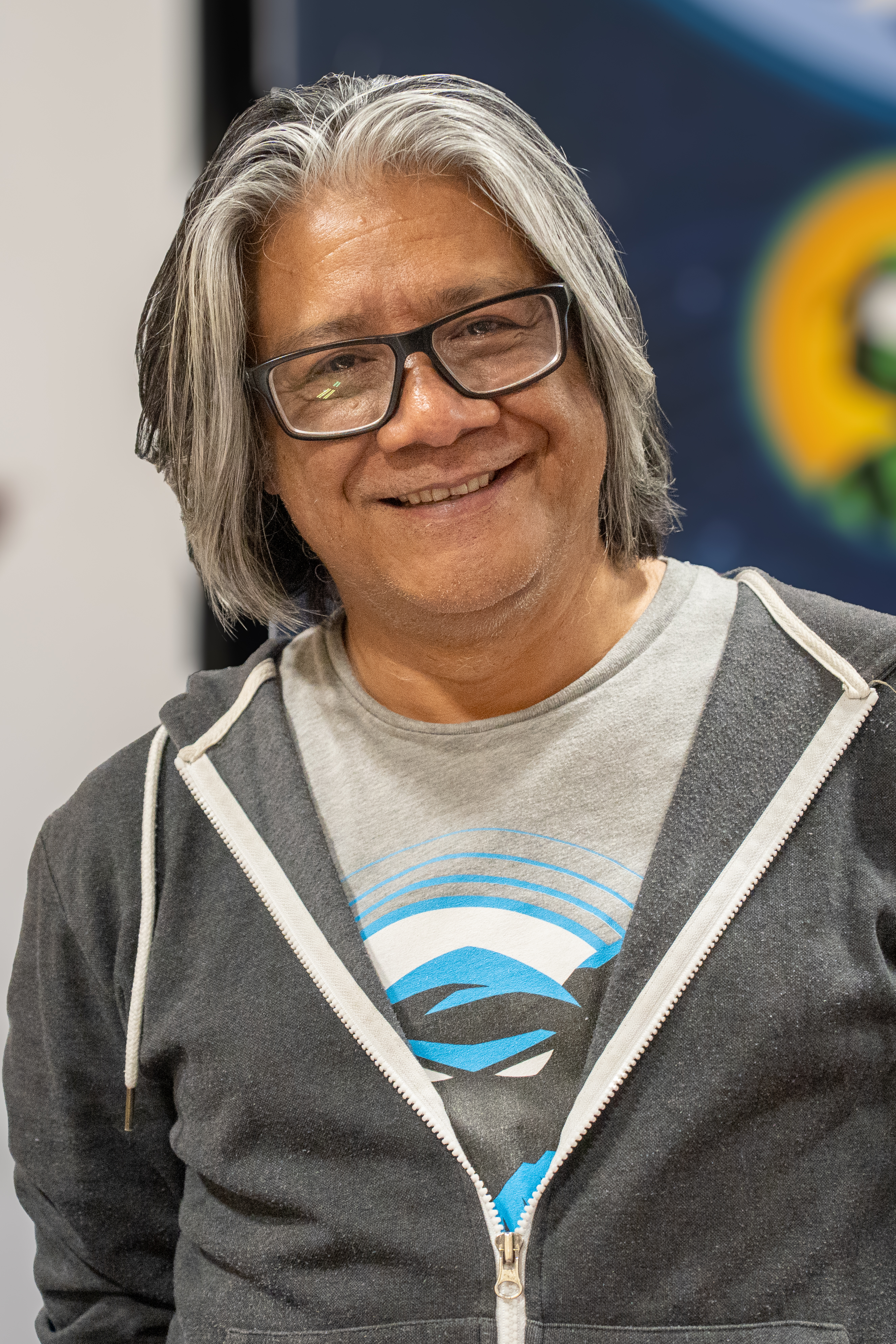
Dev Madan at Comic Con Oakland 2026

Sly 2: Band of Thieves was developed by the company responsible for the predecessor, Sucker Punch Productions. The Seattle-based developer's Brian Fleming and Elodie Hummel produced the project, Darren Rice credited as assistant producer. At Sony Computer Entertainment America, Grady Hunt was senior producer, and Greg Philips and Sam Thompson were associate producers. Nate Fox served as lead designer, working alongside Rob McDaniel, Dev Madan, Caroline Trujillo, Tom Mabe, and Keith Champagne; Fox was also dialogue and story writer. Programmers were Chris Zimmerman, Chris Bentzel, Dan Brakeley, Chris Heidorn, Steve Johnson, Bruce Oberg, Matthew Scott, and Sean Smith.

The entire process was guided by a sentence that producer Brian Fleming wrote a month in: "Sly and the gang work together to pull off a string of big heists." Tenchu: Stealth Assassins (1998) was referenced for creating the stealth gameplay. Like all of Sucker Punch's previous games, such as the first Sly Cooper entry and Rocket: Robot on Wheels (1999), the target audience was all ages, with the upbeat nature for younger gamers and gameplay concepts and humour for older and hardcore players. Also similar to the developer's previous projects, the designers and artists went for jungle gym-esque stages, focusing on interactivity over simply giving the player obstacles. For the scenarios, Fox wanted the player to feel like they were in a heist film, "like you're watching from the shadows, like you're empowered to do things and have no one know that you're doing them."

The goal from the beginning was to expand on the first entry's gameplay elements, concepts, and locations, and its engine was rewritten to accompany this. One method of enhancing the gameplay was the incorporation of non-linear gameplay assets, such as the freedom to enter and complete areas in any order and variable paths for characters in missions. Explained Fox, this was so the player felt like they were in control of the whole experience instead of just the character, similar to Deus Ex (2000). Some trial and error was involved in conceiving level geometry from adjusting to the variables of the guards. The artificial intelligence (AI) of enemies were also improved for the experience of completing a game differing from session-to-session.

=== Visuals and worlds ===
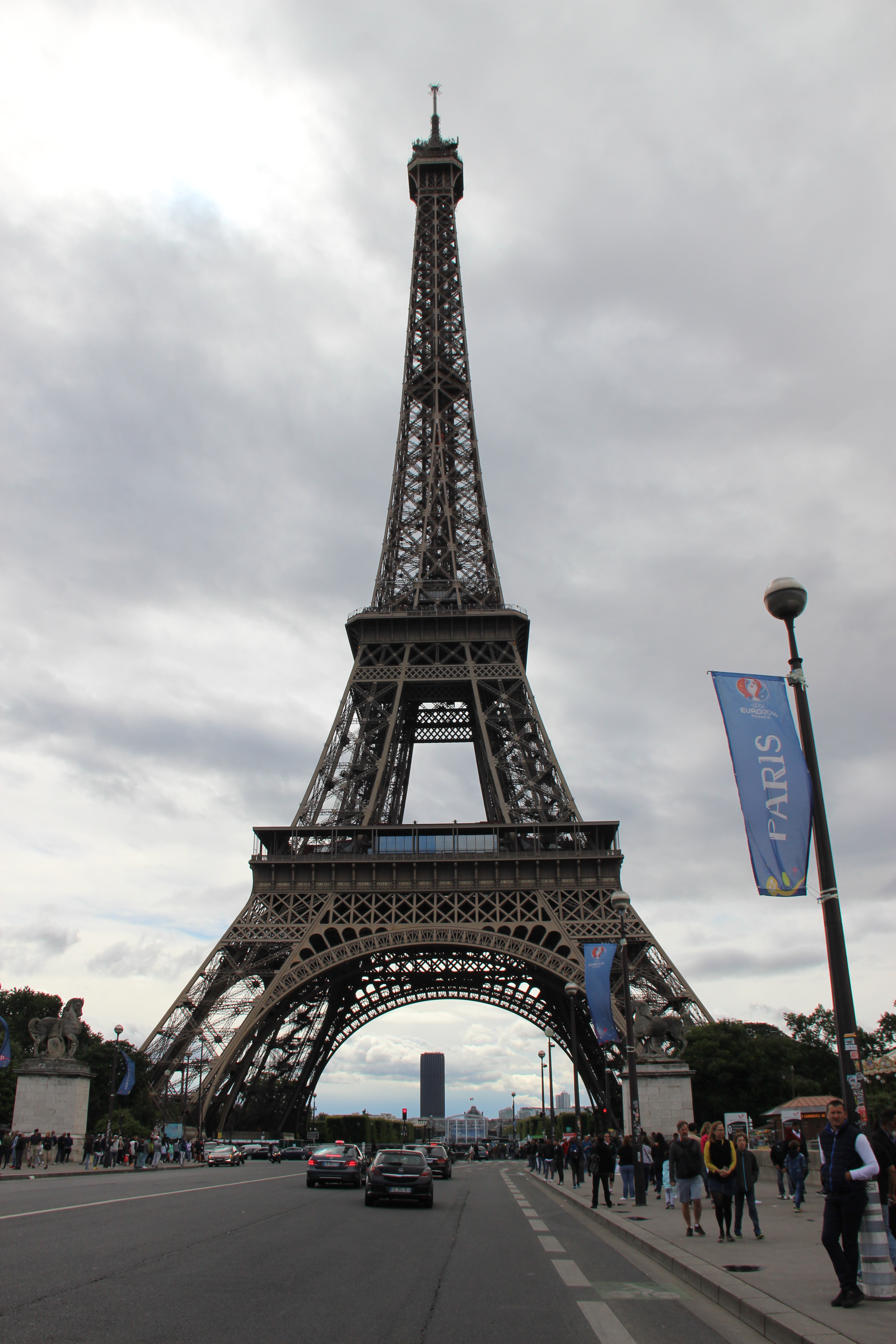
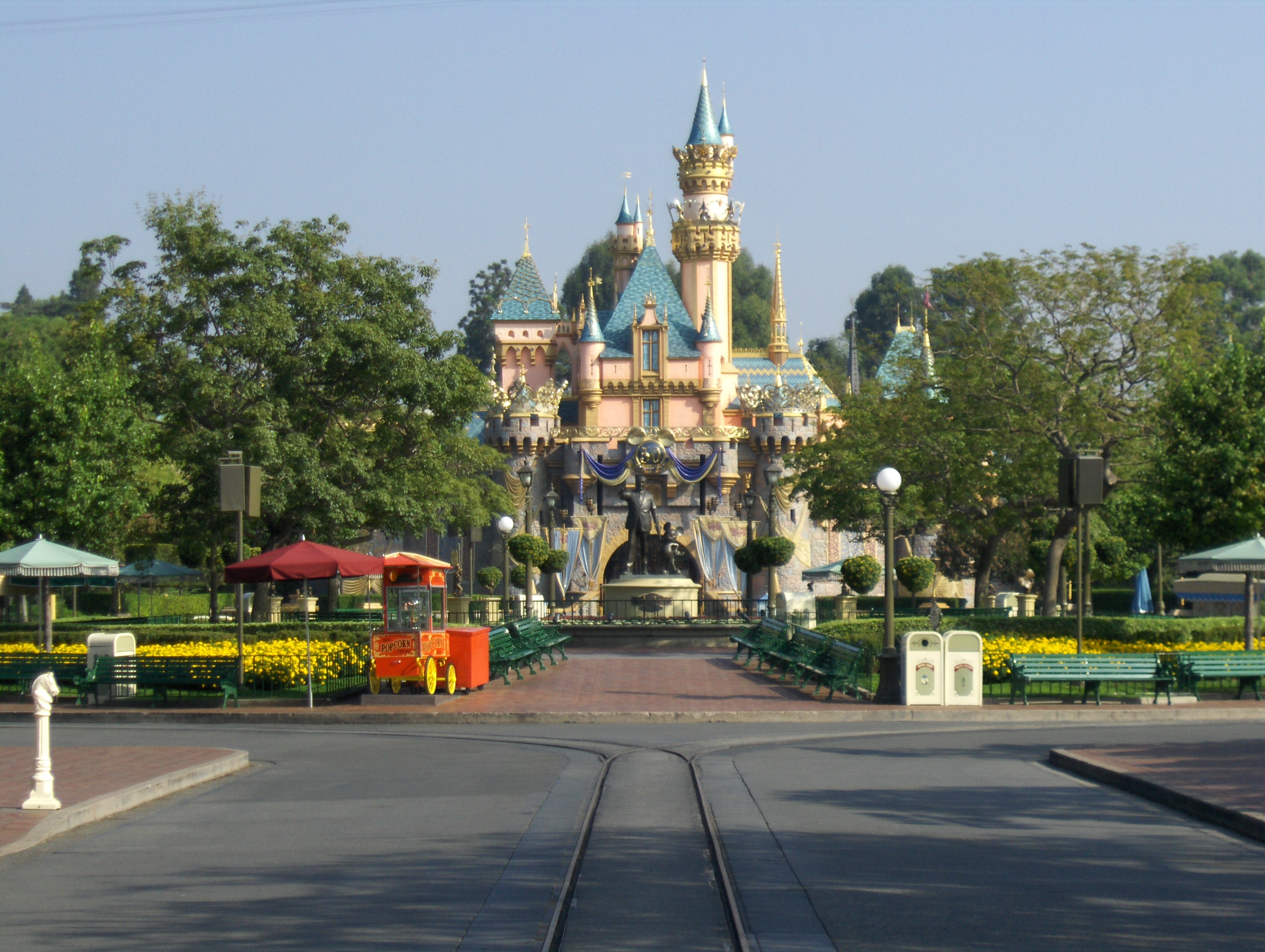
Sly 2: Band of Thieves features architecture guiding the player from a distance, such as the Eiffel Tower (left), inspired by "weenies" at Disneyland that serve the same purpose, such as Sleeping Beauty Castle (right).

Lead artist was Madan, overseeing concept art, cutscenes and character designs. Suzanne Kaufman was 3D animator, Andrew Woods character animator, and Karin Yamagiwa texture artist. Other members of the art team included Travis Kotzebue, Paul Whitehead, Hokyo Lim, Ramey Harris, Augie Pagan, Edward Pun, and Joanna Wang, with Kathy Anderson, Logan Bender, Jordan Kotzebue, Dan Phillips, Shane White, and Scott Wiener credited as additional artists.

The look and style was inspired by Batman: The Animated Series (1992–1995), Fox noting its film noir look combined with tongue-in-cheek humor. It also was influenced by comic books and various 1970s Saturday-morning cartoons. Madan explained the goal was to make an interactive cartoon, where Sly "pop[ed]" out of the screen when he jumped. This was accomplished by having the most detailed assets the farthest away and in the background, and the simplest and most "abstract", as well as the flat-looking characters, in the front, per the cartoon shows they referenced.

Usual at Sucker Punch, the visual-making process was the greenlighting of ideas from concept artists, then designers using it to figure out the geometry and placement of characters and objects in levels, then concept artists filling in the details; this was all before modeling, texturing, and lighting. For Sly 2: Band of Thieves, the concept art production started with Madan coming up with bosses, as they would dictate the feel of the levels, before the entire art staff conceived locations to base them on. For antagonists, artists decided on drawing two types, serious and comedic, and had their proportions as asymmetrical as possible so they were identifiable from a distance.

Using photographs of the real-life locations, the first concept drawings for settings focused on the types of shapes, space, and height of buildings and architecture. At least one drawing was made per world, and two if it had that many areas, such as India which has a cave and market. What followed was drawings of the same levels with actual assets, such as decorations, bridges, columns, doors, roofs and the like. At this stage, the artists attempted to achieve the most personality in as few drawings as possible. The levels were then modeled in Maya. First, basic shapes were placed for the designers to test the stages for interactivity and feeling of movement, tweaks done from these experiences. Then, modelers came in to fully shape the assets into what they became in the final product.

The goal was to make the environments immersive and pretty to view, "but never more important than Sly." The incorporation of far-away massive noticeable architecture that direct the player, such as the Eiffel Tower, was inspired by Disneyland's "weenies", such as Sleeping Beauty Castle and Space Mountain, that served the same purpose. This concept meant camera views were figured out during concept drawing of the locations. Fox also explained the pathways were inspired by Y-intersection-filled road paths common in European countries, where due to not being able to see what is ahead, the driver notices a new plaza or building by surprise. The artists also made sure to not overstuff the stages, so that the overall look was not absent of the series' stylization and filled with moiré pattern.

=== Audio ===
Bill Wolford was the game's sound designer. Peter McConnell composed the music and performed strings and hand percussion, along with Michael Olmos performing trumpet and Jerome Rossen accordion. Laurie Bauman produced the voice acting and wrote the dialogue with the help of Carrie Palk, David Howe, and Wendi Willis, who voiced the "bad animals" in the game. Kevin Miller, Matt Olsen and Chris Murphy reprise their roles as Sly Cooper, Murray and Bentley respectively, with newcomers Alisha Glidewell as Carmelita and Neyla, David Scully as Dimitri and Rajan, Gloria Manon as The Contessa, Ross Douglas as Jean Bison and Sam Mowry as Arpeggio.

== Release ==
In North America and Europe, Sly 2: Band of Thieves was one of three games Sony Computer Entertainment published as part of the 2004 holiday, with the others being Ratchet & Clank: Up Your Arsenal and Jak 3. The game was released in North America on September 14, 2004, and in Europe and Australia on October 29, 2004. It was released in Japan by Sony Computer Entertainment on June 16, 2005 as Kaitou: Sly Cooper 2 (怪盗スライ・クーパー2). Sly 2: Band of Thieves was one of the games offered by Sony Computer Entertainment America as a free replacement for the PlayStation Underground 'Holiday 2004' demo disc after it was discovered that the Viewtiful Joe 2 demo included on the demo disc could erase all data on any inserted memory cards.

The original PlayStation 2 version of the game was digitally re-released on PlayStation 4 and PlayStation 5 on December 11, 2024, which consists of trophy support, save states, and rendering options.

== Reception ==
Reception

Aggregate score
Aggregator	Score
Metacritic	88/100

Review scores
Publication	Score
1Up.com	A
Edge	6/10
Electronic Gaming Monthly	26.5/30
Eurogamer	8/10
Game Informer	8.75/10
GamePro	18/20; 9/10 (AU)
GameRevolution	B+
GameSpot	8.4/10
GameSpy	4.5/5
GameZone	9.1/10
Hyper	90/100
IGN	9.2/10
Official U.S. PlayStation Magazine	5/5
X-Play	4/5
The Sydney Morning Herald	4/5
Play	A−

Sly 2: Band of Thieves received "generally favorable" reviews, according to review aggregator Metacritic. It received a runner-up position in GameSpot's 2004 "Best Platformer" award category across all platforms, losing to Ratchet & Clank: Up Your Arsenal. At the AIAS' 8th Annual Interactive Achievement Awards, Sly 2 was awarded "Console Children's Game of the Year" (along with receiving nominations for outstanding achievement in "Animation", "Art Direction", and "Sound Design").

Jörg Luibl of 4Players enjoyed the game's "quiet, acrobatic elegance that is second to none" to other platform games that were generally more noisy in personality, such as the third Ratchet and Clank game. He called the level design the best he had seen in a while, and appreciated the freedom of choice, where you "have your goal in mind without dead ends. You can let off steam in the city as you wish, change characters, buy items and also go on a treasure hunt away from the story."

The control was praised, called by Bro Buzz of GamePro one of the most user-friendly setups in gaming.

The storytelling and humor were highly thought of by reviewers, who noted the charm and twists and described the experience as interactivity with a cartoon, specifically a Cartoon Network show or animated film. However, Luibl thought that the dialog lacked the previous entry's "funny coolness and liveliness," and was critical towards the German subtitles and dubbing, such as spelling errors and lack of disparity between voice actors.

The graphics were acclaimed, particularly the cel shading. Luibl called them better than the predecessor, citing examples of the "wonderfully lively" environments such as fog, lanterns lit up in the dark, and the "fairy tale" look of India. The character animation and design was well-received. Luibl in addition to the enemies, cited Sly Cooper, particularly his prancing, whirling jumps, and squatting animation. Luibl compared the music to Grim Fandango (1998), which was also composed by McConnell.

Luibl reported Sly 2: Band of Thieves taking 15–20 hours to beat. He found the game easy, praising its subtle rise in difficulty and being free of the trial and error and prolonged wandering of Jak II (2003) thanks to the save system and pointers indicating where heists begin.

The camera was the most critiqued aspect. Bro Buzz disliked the absence of an instant centering of the view around Sly, resulting in him being obscured during altercations with enemies. He also reported the camera sometimes getting stuck on collision and not catching up to the player character. Luibl wrote that when Sly jumps down, walls block the view.

Luibl criticized many of the heists as linear and sometimes involving performing the same actions as prior heists. He explained that this was the most prevalent in Bentley's heists, which frequently involving taking pictures and hacking into computers. For him, this negatively affected the replay value, which was only contributed via the game's 30 secret bottles.

== Legacy ==
Sly 2: Band of Thieves frequently appears on all-time lists of PlayStation 2 games, ranking number 23 by GameSpy and SVG.com, number 24 by IGN, and appearing on unranked features by Digital Trends, and VG247. Sly 2: Band of Thieves is generally considered by critics to be the best Sly Cooper game, a successful expansion of the qualities of the first game, its most highlighted aspects being the inclusion of three playable characters with distinct abilities and the variety and captivity of the worlds.

It is also considered unique from most other video games, particularly stealth and adventure games, for its Saturday-morning cartoon nature, humor, lighthearted-ness, and caper-centric gameplay. IGN's PlayStation 2 ranking held this opinion, already celebrating the series for its distinct combination of family-friendliness with stealth and "genuinely funny" comedy. Gameplay centered around scenarios similar to those in heist films, like Ocean's 11 (1960) and The Italian Job (1969), are commonplace in realistic open world crime video games, most notably the Grand Theft Auto series (1997–present). However, as USgamer commemorated, Sly 2 was a rare example to successfully balance requirements and liberty when it came to heists; they have to be completed in order to progress to others, but the player had flexibility with how to do so.

== Sequels ==
Sly 2: Band of Thieves was followed by Sly 3: Honor Among Thieves (2005) developed by Sucker Punch, and Sly Cooper: Thieves in Time (2013), which was developed by Sanzaru Games with influence from Band of Thieves.
