= Sly 3: Honor Among Thieves =

2005 video game

- North American box art
- Developer: Sucker Punch Productions
- Publisher: Sony Computer Entertainment
- Producer: Brian Fleming
- Designers: Nate Fox; Rob McDaniel
- Programmer: Chris Zimmerman
- Artists: Dev Madan; Suzanne Kaufman; Paul Whitehead; Travis Kotzebue; Jordan Kotzebue; Karin Madan; Kathy Anderson; Rafael Calonzo Jr.
- Writer: Nate Fox
- Composer: Peter McConnell
- Series: Sly Cooper
- Platform: PlayStation 2
- Release: NA: September 26, 2005; AU: November 17, 2005; EU: November 18, 2005
- Genres: Stealth, action-adventure
- Modes: Single-player, multiplayer

Sly 3: Honor Among Thieves is a 2005 stealth action video game developed by Sucker Punch Productions and published by Sony Computer Entertainment for the PlayStation 2. It is the third game in the Sly Cooper series and the final to be developed by Sucker Punch Productions, as Sanzaru Games would develop later installments.

Sly 3: Honor Among Thieves received generally positive reviews from critics and is considered to be one of the best PlayStation 2 video games. It was remastered by Sanzaru Games alongside its predecessors for the PlayStation 3 as The Sly Collection.

Alongside its predecessor, Sly 3: Honor Among Thieves was digitally re-released for PlayStation 4 and PlayStation 5 on December 11, 2024.

== Gameplay ==
New variations in the game include additional playable characters besides those of Sly, Murray, and Bentley. Firstly, Inspector Carmelita Fox is a playable character in some of the mini-games and a few times in the main game. Secondly, some new characters have been introduced, including a shaman named The Guru and a mouse named Penelope. Finally, characters from previous titles, such as Dimitri and the Panda King, are playable as well.

Furthermore, Bentley and Murray have the ability to pick-pocket in this game. Murray hoists stunned or unsuspecting guards above his head and shakes them down for coins and loot. The coins must be picked up off the ground after the guard is shaken. Bentley uses a fishing rod-like magnet to reel in coins and loot. When the magnet attaches, Bentley moves away from the guard to pick the pocket. Pickpocketed loot no longer needs to be sold back at the safe house. The amount an item is worth is added immediately to the coin count. Special treasure is absent from the over world.

The game also contains 3-D sections in the PS2 version of the game. 3-D glasses were distributed with physical copies of the game, and are used in certain parts of the game. However, 3-D effects are optional, allowing the player to view the levels in standard 2-D instead. Some levels are playable in 3-D from the beginning, while other levels require the 3-D feature to be unlocked. The 3-D effect is focused upon certain objects in the background rather than the characters themselves, minimizing the necessary blue/red separation and making it easier for observers without 3-D glasses. The 3d features in removed in re-releases.

Sly 3 features new gameplay elements and skills, such as safe-cracking, searching for clues and objects in paintings, aerial combat, disguises, pirate ship battles, and conversations. However, the removal of clue bottles and vaults was unpopular with players.

To increase replay value, an offline multiplayer mode is included, along with challenges and extra movies unlocked for specific game completion percentages. The multiplayer games are: Cops and Robbers, Hackathon, Bi-Plane Duel, and Galleon Duel. Challenges are missions that are set with specific standards, along with a Treasure Hunt mission for each world attained at the end of the game.

== Plot ==
Sly 3 opens in medias res one year after the events of Sly 2: Band of Thieves: Sly Cooper, Bentley, and other unidentified characters are attempting a vault heist on an island in the Pacific Ocean. They are intercepted by Dr. M, the island's owner. Sly gives up his family's cane to save Bentley from a monster, but gets captured himself. While the monster crushes him, Sly's life flashes before his eyes. He recounts his family's history and the events of the prior two games. He recalls meeting one of his father's colleagues, Jim McSweeney, who revealed to Sly the existence of the vault and that it contains the Cooper family's accumulated wealth built up over the centuries. Sly went to find the vault, only to discover Dr. M had built a fortress on the island in an attempt to enter the vault himself. Sly needed additional experts to get past Dr. M's extensive security; he needed to expand the Cooper Gang.

The majority of the game is a large flashback that recounts how Sly and Bentley recruited more members for the heist. They first sought to bring back Murray, who had left the gang after taking responsibility for Bentley's paralysis resulting from the end of the previous game. He had begun studying Dreamtime from a Guru to find inner peace, and the Guru had sent Murray on a mission to clean the water in Venice, Italy. Sly broke Dimitri out of a local prison in exchange for Dimitri's help in locating Murray. Sly and Bentley learned that the local mob boss, Octavio, was polluting the water with tar as part of a scheme to threaten the city into liking opera again. They foiled Octavio's plan but he injured Bentley, leading Murray to defeat Octavio in battle to defend Bentley. Murray re-joined the gang but felt guilty about resorting to violence, so the gang traveled to Yuendumu in Australia's Northern Territory to allow Murray to reconcile his actions with the Guru. They discovered the Guru was captured by local miners who were tearing up Aboriginal sacred sites in search of precious opals. After freeing the Guru, he informed the gang that the miners had inadvertently awoken the Mask of Dark Earth, a sentient mask that makes its wearer a vicious, powerful giant. The mask latched onto Carmelita Fox, who had continued her chase against the gang. The Guru assisted the gang in removing the miners from his land, freeing Carmelita, and destroying the mask. He joined the gang to continue Murray's training and return the favor for their help.

In search of a robotics combat expert beyond his own abilities, Bentley met a Dutch mouse named Penelope online. She agreed to join the gang if they could prove themselves by taking down her boss, the Black Baron, in his flying competition. The gang traveled to Kinderdijk, the Netherlands and entered Sly in the competition. Dimitri, who was hired as a color commentator, helped the gang sabotage the other teams—including one run by Muggshot—in exchange for a favor later. Sly defeated the Black Baron, who was revealed to be Penelope in costume; she had donned the persona to get around the competition's minimum age requirement. With her time as the Black Baron over, Penelope joined the gang without hesitation. Bentley determined they still needed an exceptional demolitions expert and suggested recruiting Sly's former enemy, the Panda King, much to Sly's dismay. Bentley explained the Panda King had forsaken his life of crime; upon meeting him in China, the Panda King elaborated that his daughter, Jing King, had been kidnapped by a local general, Tsao, who was planning to forcibly marry her. Sly and the Panda King reconciled their past to work together and save her. In the process, Murray recovered the team van, which had floated all the way from Canada in the previous game. After the gang rescued Jing King, Carmelita arrested General Tsao and escorted him to jail, while the Panda King left his daughter safely with her aunt and joined the gang to repay his debt.

Dimitri emailed Sly to call in the favor he mentioned in Holland. He bought tickets for the whole gang to travel to Blood Bath Bay, a pirate town in the Caribbean Sea that maintained the ways of piracy. Dimitri was searching for his grandfather's scuba diving gear and the loot he had obtained from undersea wrecks, all of which was stolen by a local pirate. The gang successfully recovered the scuba gear, but another pirate, Captain LeFwee, stole the loot and kidnapped Penelope. The gang worked together to rescue her from LeFwee's ship; during the rescue, Bentley freed Penelope from her cell, but LeFwee injured him. While he prepared to deal a final blow, Penelope took the opportunity to grab a sword and challenge LeFwee to a duel. She defeated him and the gang escaped the harbor. Bentley and Penelope became a couple while Dimitri, unprompted, informed the gang that he'd be joining them as their frogman for the Cooper Vault heist.

The flashback ends and the game returns to the present day, where Sly is still struggling in the grip of Dr. M's monster. Carmelita arrives on the island with mercenaries and battles the monster, intending on capturing both Dr. M and Sly. With both Carmelita and the monster distracted, Dr. M escapes while the gang rescues Sly. As he recovers, the gang works to retrieve Sly's family cane, the key to the vault, battling Dr. M multiple times in the process. Dr. M reveals to Sly that he also worked with Sly's father but, unlike McSweeney, he felt that he was mistreated and resolved to steal the Cooper fortune for himself. Sly recovers his cane and enters the vault alone while Bentley and Murray defend the entrance. Dr. M battles them before following Sly into the vault's Inner Sanctum. The two fight, causing the ancient structure to begin collapsing. Carmelita arrives to arrest them both. Dr. M attempts to shoot a blast of energy at her, but Sly jumps in between to protect her. Carmelita defeats Dr. M and checks on Sly, who appears to suffer from amnesia. He asks who he is, and Carmelita, taking the opportunity to rehabilitate Sly, chooses to say that he is her partner. They escape together while Dr. M, refusing to leave the vault he worked so hard to enter, dies in the collapse. The rest of the gang finds an alternate entrance to the vault marked by Sly's family cane and his classic calling card, realizing he's alive but didn't want to be found.

When Sly does not return after a few months, the gang splits up to go their separate ways. Dimitri becomes a rich scuba diver; the Panda King returns to China to live near Jing King, who was happy to let him screen all of her future suitors; Murray completes his training with the Guru and becomes a professional race car driver using the team's van; the Guru begins teaching his mystic art to a group of rock stars in New York City; Bentley and Penelope stay together, create a new Cooper vault with higher security, and begin work on a time machine. One day, while Bentley is looking across the Paris skyline, he spots Sly and Carmelita on a balcony holding hands. Sly notices Bentley and winks, confirming he faked his amnesia to start a new life with Carmelita.

== Development and release ==
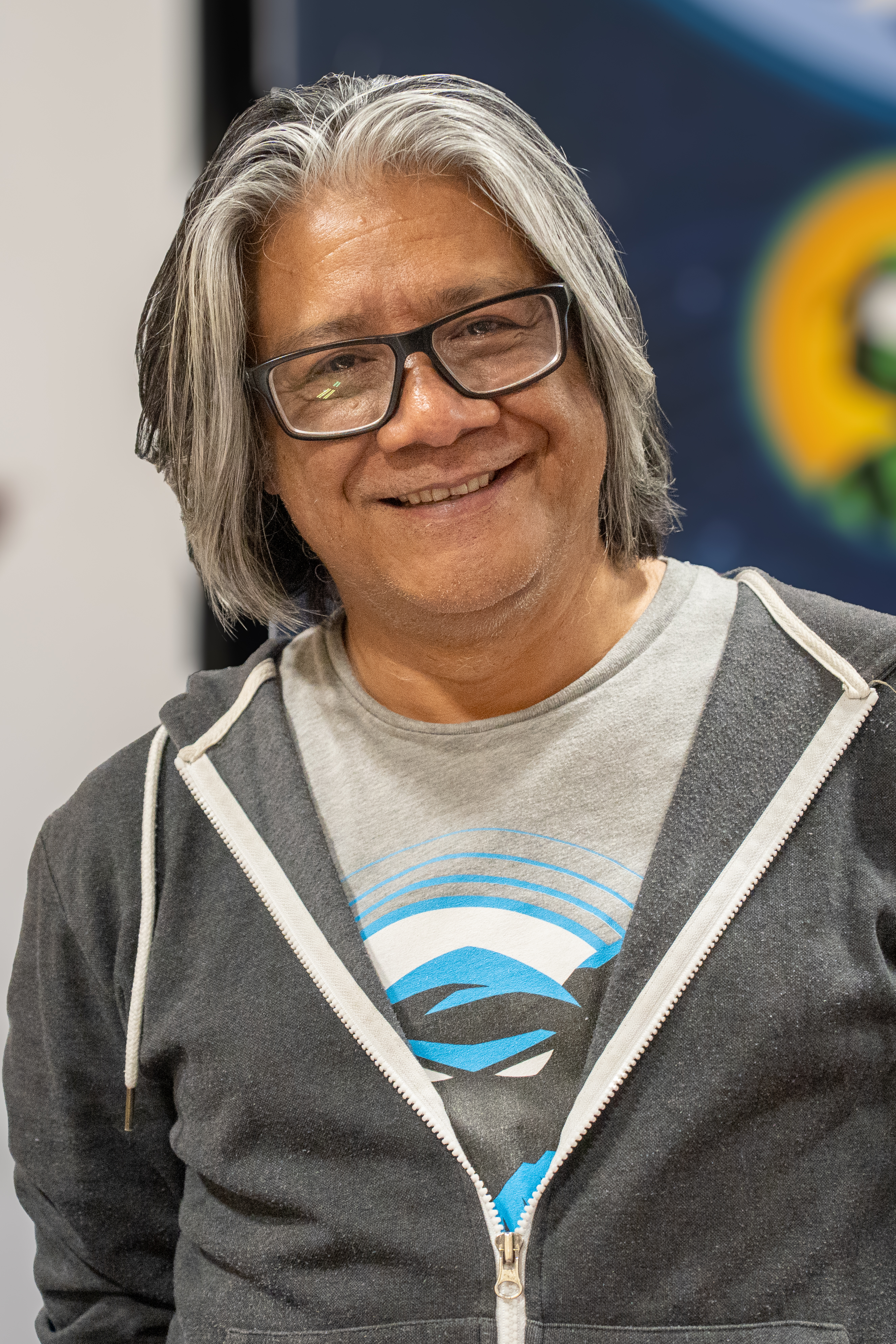
Dev Madan at Comic Con Oakland 2026

Development on a third Sly Cooper game started during the making of Sly 2: Band of Thieves. After its success, Sly 3 was rushed into development. It was reported that Sly 3 was set to have a completely different theme with the addition of multiplayer mode, a new set of characters, new vehicles, mini-games, disguises and enhanced combat move sets and replayable levels, which were also included in Sly Cooper: Thieves in Time. The game is the first in the series to not feature any clue bottles, the change was made via the addition of "treasure hunts", which are included along with the replayable levels.

Sly 3: Honor Among Thieves was released for the PlayStation 2 on September 26, 2005.

The original PlayStation 2 version of the game was digitally re-released for PlayStation 4 and PlayStation 5 on December 11, 2024, which also contains trophy support, save states, and rendering options.

== Reception ==
Reception

Aggregate score
Aggregator	Score
Metacritic	83/100

Review scores
Publication	Score
1Up.com	A
Edge	7/10
Electronic Gaming Monthly	8.5/10
Eurogamer	8/10
Game Informer	7.25/10
GamePro	4.5/5
GameRevolution	B
GameSpot	8.4/10
GameSpy	4/5
GameZone	9.3/10
IGN	8.1/10
Official U.S. PlayStation Magazine	4.5/5
The New York Times	(favorable)
The Sydney Morning Herald	4/5

Sly 3: Honor Among Thieves received "generally favorable" reviews by critics, according to review aggregator Metacritic. Complex's Rich Knight called Sly 3 the best game in the series, and the 20th best PlayStation 2 game in general.

During the 9th Annual Interactive Achievement Awards, Sly 3 received nominations for "Children's Game of the Year" and "Outstanding Achievement in Story and Character Development".

== Sequel ==
Brian Fleming of Sucker Punch Productions stated in an interview that "We're broadening ourselves a little bit, taking on some new challenges," but also noted that "I think it's extremely likely that you'll see us return to the Sly Cooper franchise at some point in the future". Nate Fox, one of the game designers for Sucker Punch Productions, also stated in a phone interview when questioned about it that he would love to make another Sly game, adding to the possibility of a sequel. An Easter egg found in the Sucker Punch game Infamous shows a movie called "Sly Cooper 4" on the building's marquee; there is also a Sly Cooper symbol on Cole's backpack and back of his pants. Upon completing all three games as part of The Sly Collection for the PlayStation 3, a movie option is enabled within the game's menus. The movie is a short video showing Sly's silhouette lurking in tall grass, followed by a Sly 4 logo, with Cooper's trademark cane used as a question mark, teasing the possible sequel. Kevin Miller, the voice actor who voices Sly, has also confirmed that he has been contacted about voicing Sly in Sly 4, furthering its possibility.

The sequel, Sly Cooper: Thieves in Time, was revealed at Sony's E3 conference 2011, but was not being developed by Sucker Punch, but by Sanzaru Games. It was released on February 5, 2013 on PlayStation 3 and PlayStation Vita.

=== Other games ===
The Sly Collection (titled as The Sly Cooper Collection in Japan and The Sly Trilogy in Europe and in some parts of Australia) is a remastered port of Sly Cooper and the Thievius Raccoonus, Sly 2: Band of Thieves and Sly 3: Honor Among Thieves for the PlayStation 3 on a single Blu-ray Disc as a Classics HD title. The game was released on November 9, 2010. The Collection updates the graphics, including support for the 3D capabilities of the PlayStation 3, new mini-games that can be played using the PlayStation Move or standard controller and additional title supports such as Trophies.

PlayStation Move Heroes is a 2011 action-adventure video game developed by Nihilistic Software and published by Sony Computer Entertainment. It was released for the PlayStation 3 on March 22, 2011, and utilizes the PlayStation Move. It is a cross-over of the Jak and Daxter, Ratchet & Clank, and Sly Cooper franchises to form a total of six main characters.

== See also ==
- Stereoscopic video game
- List of stereoscopic video games
