= Sucker Punch Productions =

American video game developer

Sucker Punch Productions, LLC
- Logo used since 2013
- Type: Subsidiary
- Industry: Video games
- Founded: October 1997; 29 years ago
- Founders: Brian Fleming; Bruce Oberg; Darrell Plank; Tom Saxton; Cathy Saxton; Chris Zimmerman
- Headquarters: Bellevue, Washington, US
- Key people: Jason Connell (studio head and creative director); Adrian Bentley (studio head); Nate Fox (creative director)
- Products: Rocket: Robot on Wheels; Sly Cooper series; Infamous series; Ghost of Tsushima; Ghost of Yōtei
- Number of employees: 160 (2020)
- Parent: PlayStation Studios (2011–present)
- Website: suckerpunch.com

Sucker Punch Productions, LLC is an American video game developer based in Bellevue, Washington. It is best known for creating character action games for PlayStation consoles such as Sly Cooper, Infamous, and Ghost of Tsushima. The studio has been a part of PlayStation Studios since 2011. As of 2020, the company employs about 160 people.

Sucker Punch Productions was founded in October 1997 by Brian Fleming, Bruce Oberg, Darrell Plank, Tom and Cathy Saxton, and Chris Zimmerman. The founders worked at Microsoft before joining the video game industry. Despite having a difficult time finding a publisher and funding, the group's first project, Rocket: Robot on Wheels, was released in 1999. While it did not perform well commercially, it was well received by critics, which encouraged the team to develop another platform game in 2002 named Sly Cooper and the Thievius Raccoonus. The team approached Sony Computer Entertainment to publish the game, which became an unexpected commercial success and spawned a franchise with two sequels: Sly 2: Band of Thieves (2004) and Sly 3: Honor Among Thieves (2005).

After working on three Sly Cooper games, the team continued its partnership with Sony and pivoted to making an open-world, comic book-inspired superhero game titled Infamous (2009). Infamous was a modest success and Sucker Punch followed it up with two sequels, Infamous 2 (2011) and Infamous Second Son (2014). After the release of Infamous 2, Sony acquired Sucker Punch for an undisclosed sum. Following the release of Second Son, the studio spent six years working on the next game, Ghost of Tsushima (2020), which went on to become one of Sony's fastest-selling original games for the PlayStation 4, selling more than 13 million copies. A sequel, Ghost of Yōtei, was released for the PlayStation 5 on October 2, 2025.

== History ==
=== Founding and Rocket ===
Sucker Punch Productions was founded in October 1997 by Brian Fleming, Chris Zimmerman, Bruce Oberg, Darrell Plank, Tom Saxton, and Cathy Saxton, who first met while they worked at Microsoft. Zimmerman was "disenchanted" with his career in Microsoft and wanted to do something different. He approached co-workers Fleming and Oberg and shared his idea about starting a video game company. The brand name was created from one of several names the team had unsuccessfully proposed as project codenames at Microsoft. Zimmerman shared the name options with his wife to get her opinion, and she advised the team not to use Sucker Punch as the studio's name. The team went against her advice since the target audience for video games at that time was mostly young men, a group which the name Sucker Punch would resonate with. After the establishment of the studio, the team began working on their first game. Seeing the release of games like Oddworld: Abe's Oddysee on PlayStation, the team felt they lacked the necessary skills and experience to compete with them. Instead, the team decided to develop their new game for Nintendo 64, codenamed Puzzle Factory. This first game was inspired by a computer game named The Incredible Machine and was to feature 3D visuals, but the plan was scrapped. Two of the founders, Tom and Cathy Saxton, left Sucker Punch Productions in 1998.

After purchasing a development kit from Nintendo, the founders began self-funding a platform game named Sprocket. The team pitched the game to publishers when it was halfway through production as they thought this path would pose less risk. Activision and Acclaim Entertainment were among the approached parties, but most of them were not interested. They also pitched it to Sony, the manufacturers of the PlayStation series of consoles, which declined since Sprocket was made for the Nintendo 64, one of PlayStation's competitors. THQ nearly agreed to publish the game, but that deal fell apart several weeks before E3 1999. Electronic Arts once offered to sign a deal with Sucker Punch for a PlayStation 2 title, though it would have required the company to cancel Sprocket. While the founders were pitching the project, development of the game progressed smoothly. A total of seventeen people worked on the game. Sprocket's production was nearly complete when Ubi Soft agreed to publish the game after seeing positive press reaction to it. The project, which was later renamed Rocket: Robot on Wheels following a trademark dispute, received generally positive reviews when it was released in 1999, however, it was not commercially successful, with Fleming describing the audience response as "tepid".

=== Sly Cooper success ===
Following the critical success of Rocket, Sucker Punch developed another character action game. The project, titled Sly Cooper and the Thievius Raccoonus, stars a raccoon thief as its protagonist. According to Fleming, "the sight gag of a raccoon putting on a mask somehow seemed super funny to us." Learning from the frustrating process of pitching Rocket to publishers, Sucker Punch decided to approach a publisher first. Fleming observed that the most successful platform games at that time were the ones released by console manufacturers. The team approached Sony who agreed to publish the game for the PlayStation 2. Working with Sony allowed the team to streamline its development goals since they were developing the game for one platform. As the game was developed for young players, the team initially worried about Cooper being a thief and if that would enforce a message to young players that stealing was acceptable. The writers remedied this by introducing Sly as a master thief who only steals from other thieves. "Thievius Raccoonus" are Latin-style words invented by the team. Development of the game lasted for 3 years, during which time Plank departed the team. Creative director Nate Fox described the launch of Sly Cooper as a tense experience for the team as Sucker Punch was an unproven studio at that time, and they were unsure about whether the market would be interested in such a "wacko game". Sly Cooper and the Thievius Raccoonus was released in 2002 and was both a commercial and critical success selling about 1 million copies, surpassing the studio's expectations.

Thievius Raccoonus' success enabled the studio to pursue a sequel. Fleming said that the sequel was about Sly and his companions collaborating with each other to "pull off strings of big heists", while Fox said that it was inspired by Hollywood heist films. To help differentiate the game from Thievius Raccoonus, the sequel features improved gameplay and artificial intelligence, a larger cast of characters, and more open levels. Sly 2: Band of Thieves was released in 2004 to generally positive reviews. It was followed by a sequel, Sly 3: Honor Among Thieves, though its development was rushed. The team only had 11-and-a-half months to complete its production. Despite this, the game received generally positive reviews when it was released in 2005. Sly 3 was the last game in the Sly Cooper series developed by Sucker Punch. The studio was not directly involved in the creation of Sly Cooper: Thieves in Time (2013), which was developed externally by Sanzaru Games. Sanzaru previously collaborated with Sucker Punch on The Sly Collection for the PlayStation 3 and PlayStation Vita.

=== Infamous and acquisition by Sony ===
The success of the Sly Cooper franchise elevated Sucker Punch's stature as a development studio, although it wanted to work on something new in order to stay relevant. The studio pitched four projects to Sony, including a project named Nasty Little Things in which the player character would summon little creatures from their tattoos and go on adventures with them, and a project named Uncharted, in which the player character must survive on an island filled with dinosaurs. Sony ultimately greenlighted True Hero, in which the player must make different decisions as a superhero. True Hero, which would ultimately become Infamous. It was initially pitched as a superhero game with gameplay that resembled Animal Crossing, though this idea was scrapped six months later, and the game pivoted to become a superhero origin story inspired by comic books such as Batman: No Man's Land and DMZ. Infamous was also the studio's first open-world game, with development lasting three years by a team of 60 people. It received generally positive reviews and sold nearly 2 million copies as in 2010.

With the success of the first game, Sucker Punch began working on a sequel. Infamous 2 was released in June 2011 to generally positive reviews. Sucker Punch was a second-party developer for Sony for more than a decade, and Sly and Infamous are both intellectual properties owned by Sony. Sony announced in August 2011 that it would fully acquire Sucker Punch for an undisclosed sum. With the acquisition, Sucker Punch also became part of SCE Worldwide Studios. The acquisition talks had lasted about two years. Fleming, commenting on the acquisition in 2013, added that Sucker Punch's nature as a "one-team shop", the increasing team size, and its long history of collaboration with Sony, in particular its product development team at Foster City Studio, as the key reasons why Sucker Punch agreed to Sony's acquisition.

With Sony's support and funding, the studio continued to make Infamous games, releasing the standalone expansion Festival of Blood in October 2011. It quickly became PlayStation Network's fastest-selling game, until its record was broken by Journey in 2012. Following the release of Festival of Blood, the team commenced working on Infamous Second Son, the next main game in the Infamous series. Sucker Punch elected to set the sequel in their hometown of Seattle as they could draw from their personal experiences in the open world's design. It also replaces the series protagonist Cole MacGrath with a new character named Delsin Rowe. More than 110 people worked on the game, though the number was still considered to be small for a big-budget triple-A game. Second Son was released for the PlayStation 4 in March 2014. The game received generally positive reviews and was a commercial success, selling more than 1 million copies in nine days. Sucker Punch released a standalone expansion titled Infamous: First Light in August 2014. The studio was hit with layoffs in the same month.

=== Ghost of Tsushima and Ghost of Yōtei ===
Following the release of Second Son, the team began brainstorming their next game. Sucker Punch wanted to create an open-world game with a large emphasis on melee combat. The team considered themes such as pirates and Scottish folk heroes, and a playable prototype named Prophecy. Prophecy, which is set in a steampunk city, was created in 2015 or 2016 and leaked in 2020. The team ultimately decided that the game would be set in feudal Japan and would feature a samurai as the protagonist. The art and the environment teams had a difficult time transitioning into the project as the game was a huge departure stylistically from the Infamous franchise, which has a "punk rock" aesthetic. This caused a significantly longer production time compared to other Sucker Punch titles, with development lasting for about six years. The game, titled Ghost of Tsushima, was released in July 2020 as one of PlayStation 4's last first-party exclusive titles. It was a huge commercial success and quickly became one of Sony's fastest-selling new intellectual properties, selling over 13 million copies by September 2024. As a result of the game's success, directors Jason Connell and Fox became tourism ambassadors for the island of Tsushima in 2021, and a film based on the game is in development. A sequel, Ghost of Yōtei, was announced in September 2024. The development team was inspired to set the game around Mount Yōtei after multiple visits to northern Japan. The game was released for the PlayStation 5 in October 2025.

== Games developed ==
Year	Title	Platform(s)
1999	Rocket: Robot on Wheels	Nintendo 64
2002	Sly Cooper and the Thievius Raccoonus	PlayStation 2
2004	Sly 2: Band of Thieves	PlayStation 2
2005	Sly 3: Honor Among Thieves	PlayStation 2
2009	Infamous	PlayStation 3
2011	Infamous 2	PlayStation 3
2011	Infamous: Festival of Blood	PlayStation 3
2014	Infamous Second Son	PlayStation 4
2014	Infamous First Light	PlayStation 4
2020	Ghost of Tsushima	PlayStation 4, PlayStation 5, Windows
2025	Ghost of Yōtei	PlayStation 5
