= Sly Cooper and the Thievius Raccoonus =

2002 video game

- North American cover art
- Developer: Sucker Punch Productions
- Publisher: Sony Computer Entertainment
- Producer: Brian Fleming
- Designers: Nate Fox; Rob McDaniel
- Programmer: Chris Zimmerman
- Artists: Dev Madan; Reid Johnson; Travis Kotzebue; Karin Madan; Hokyo Lim
- Writer: Nate Fox
- Composer: Ashif Hakik
- Series: Sly Cooper
- Platform: PlayStation 2
- Release: NA: September 24, 2002; AU: January 16, 2003; EU: January 17, 2003
- Genres: Stealth, platform
- Mode: Single-player

Sly Cooper and the Thievius Raccoonus (known as Sly Raccoon in PAL regions) is a 2002 stealth platform video game developed by Sucker Punch Productions and published by Sony Computer Entertainment for the PlayStation 2. It is the first installment in the Sly Cooper series. The game follows the titular Sly Cooper and his gang, Bentley the Turtle and Murray the Hippo, on their mission to recover the lost pages of the "Thievius Raccoonus" (a book listing every thieving technique created by Sly's ancestors) from a rival gang known as the Fiendish Five.

Sly Cooper was praised for its technical achievements—particularly its use of a variation on cel shading to create a film noir feel while still rendering as a hand-drawn animated film—and criticized for being too short. The game was followed by three sequels: Sly 2: Band of Thieves (2004), Sly 3: Honor Among Thieves (2005), and Sly Cooper: Thieves in Time (2013). The first three games were remastered and released as The Sly Collection for the PlayStation 3 and PlayStation Vita on April 16, 2014. Sly Cooper was digitally re-released on PlayStation 4 and PlayStation 5 on June 11, 2024.

== Gameplay ==
Highlighted by the blue "thief sense" auras, Sly Cooper sneaks along a wall to avoid detection.

Sly Cooper is a third-person platformer with stealth elements. An Official U.S. PlayStation Magazine retrospective describes the gameplay as "mix[ing] one-hit-kill arcade action with Splinter Cell sneaking". The player controls Sly Cooper as he moves between each uniquely themed lair of the Fiendish Five and the sub-sections of those lairs, avoiding security systems and patrolling guards. Sly uses his cane, a family heirloom, to attack enemies, and he can be defeated with a single hit. The player is encouraged to perform stealth maneuvers and use the environment to evade or silently neutralize threats.

To assist in these stealth moves, the environment contains special areas colored with blue sparkles of light, identified in the game as Sly's thief senses. The player can trigger context-sensitive actions in these areas, such as shimmying along a narrow ledge or wall, landing on a pointed object such as an antenna or street light, climbing along the length of a narrow pole or pipe, or using the cane to grapple onto something. The player must avoid detection by security systems and enemies, otherwise, an alarm will sound and the player will either have to destroy the alarm quickly, avoid or defeat foes alerted by the alarm or hide for several seconds until the alarm resets. The game uses an adaptive music system that changes depending on the state of alarm in the area: the music will increase in volume and pacing when Sly attacks or is detected, and then will quiet down as the disturbance goes away.

Each sub-section of a lair contains a number of clue bottles that, when collected, allow Sly to access a safe in the level that contains a page from the Thievius Raccoonus. These pages grant Sly new moves to aid in movement, stealth, or combat, such as creating a decoy or dropping an explosive hat. Defeating each of the bosses also gives Sly moves, and these abilities are typically necessary to pass later levels. Coins are scattered about the levels and are also generated by defeating enemies or destroying objects. For every 100 coins collected, Sly gains a lucky horseshoe that is the color blue and when you have two horseshoes, it turns to gold. It will allow him to take extra hits, or if he currently has one, an extra life. If Sly collapses and loses a life, the current sub-level will be restarted or at a special "repeater" that acts as a checkpoint; if the player loses all of Sly's lives, they must restart that boss's lair from the beginning. Besides the regular gameplay, there are minigames that include driving levels (based on Murray), shooting levels to protect Murray as he ascends certain levels, and a cyber-tank game representing a hacking attempt by Bentley. One notable boss battle includes a rhythm-based sequence similar to Dance Dance Revolution.

Levels can be returned at any time to gain additional coins or to seek out special moves. When a level is completed, all of the clue bottles are collected and the secret move is found, the player can then attempt a "Master Sprint", a timed sprint through the level to try to beat a set time. The player can unlock additional artistic content by completing all the levels in this fashion. For each level that has the "Master Sprint" completed, a developer's commentary for that level is unlocked.

== Plot ==
Sly Cooper is an anthropomorphic raccoon and the last member of the Cooper Clan, a long line of master thieves who primarily steal from other criminals. On his 8th birthday, Sly was to inherit an ancient book known as the Thievius Raccoonus, which contains his family's secrets, to help him become a master thief. However, a group of criminals known as the "Fiendish Five" invaded his home and murdered Sly's father, then stole pages out from the Thievius Raccoonus before spreading across the world to forge their own criminal empires. Sly is sent to an orphanage, where he forms a gang with two boys who become his lifelong best friends and partners in crime: Bentley, a turtle technician, who plays the role of the brains of the gang, and Murray, a hippopotamus who acts as their getaway driver. The three leave the orphanage together at age 16 to start their lives as international vigilante criminals, naming themselves the "Cooper Gang." Sly swears to avenge his family by tracking down the Fiendish Five and recovering the pages of the Thievius Raccoonus.

Two years later, the Cooper Gang infiltrates Interpol headquarters in Paris, France to steal a secret police file containing information about the Fiendish Five. During the heist, they are ambushed by Inspector Carmelita Fox, an Interpol officer with a vendetta against the Cooper Gang. The gang manages to steal the police file and successfully escapes in the getaway van. They use the files to track the Fiendish Five to their respective hideouts around the globe. The Fiendish Five comprises Sir Raleigh, a frog pirate in Wales who built a storm machine to sink ships and steal their treasure; Muggshot, an American Bulldog gangster in Utah who took over a city to build a gambling empire; Mz. Ruby, an alligator mystic in Haiti raising an undead army; and the Panda King, a giant panda explosives expert in China using fireworks to extort and destroy villages. Sly defeats each member of The Fiendish Five and takes back their pages of the Thievius Raccoonus, then leaves them for Carmelita to arrest. Each Fiendish Five member reveals the location of the next one, up to their leader, an elusive mechanical owl named Clockwerk.

The Cooper Gang breaches Clockwerk's lair in a Russian volcano to discover that he has captured Carmelita. Sly rescues Carmelita, and they agree to a temporary truce to defeat Clockwerk. During their battle, Clockwerk reveals to Sly that he is himself a master thief; bitter and jealous of the Cooper Clan for eclipsing him with their superior talents, and in retaliation, he converted himself into a machine to gain immortality. Clockwerk explains that he killed Sly's father and stole the Thievius Raccoonus in an effort to prove that the Cooper Clan was nothing without the book; Sly counters by saying that it took great thieves to create the book, rather than the other way around.

After Clockwerk is defeated, Carmelita ends the truce by attempting to arrest Sly, but she agrees to give him a ten-second head start. Instead of running, Sly kisses her at the last second, then runs off with the gang. Carmelita is initially smitten, then realizes Sly has handcuffed her to a rail and swears to hunt him down. Sly, Bentley, and Murray return to their hideout and continue pulling off heists with the fully recovered Thievius Raccoonus. After the credits, one of Clockwerk's eyes flashes open.

== Development and release ==
Sly Cooper and the Thievius Raccoonus was the second game developed by Sucker Punch Productions, following Rocket: Robot on Wheels (1999) for the Nintendo 64. Sly Cooper was conceived shortly after Rocket was completed, and was in development for three years.

Sucker Punch used Alias Maya to develop the art assets. Brian Flemming of Sucker Punch called the rendering style "toon-shading", comparing the detailed backgrounds with cel-shading foregrounds to that of animated films. Sucker Punch wanted Sly and his world to look illustrated, and "one step away from a flattened graphic style." To prevent slowdowns with frame rates, the team "had at least one engineer working on nothing but performance for the entire development of Sly." The game art team "collected hundreds of photos and drawings of areas that looked like the worlds [they] wanted to create" to generate the backgrounds. The characters themselves underwent up to "six or eight major revisions" before the designs were finalized.

The music was composed by Ashif Hakik. The music was inspired by the artwork from the game, with Hakik stating, "stylistic influences came from a combination of instrument choices and musical character defined and inspired by the locales in the game, and similar composer works like Yoko Kanno and her work on Cowboy Bebop, Henry Mancini, and Carl [W.] Stalling." He noted that "the interactive music engine we used made us consider the gameplay for each specific level a sort of starting point that would influence the way the music would be written."

Sly Cooper and the Thievius Raccoonus was released in North America on September 24, 2002. It was subsequently released as Sly Raccoon in Australia and Europe on January 16, 2003 and January 17, 2003, respectively.

The game was remastered alongside its initial two sequels and compiled as The Sly Collection for the PlayStation 3 and PlayStation Vita on April 16, 2014. The original PlayStation 2 version of the game was digitally re-released on PlayStation 4 and PlayStation 5 on June 11, 2024 and included trophy support, save states, and rendering options.

== Reception ==
Reception

Aggregate score
Aggregator	Score
Metacritic	86/100

Review scores
Publication	Score
1Up.com	A+
AllGame	4/5
Edge	6/10
Electronic Gaming Monthly	8.33/10
Eurogamer	8/10
Game Informer	9.25/10
GamePro	4/5
GameRevolution	B+
GameSpot	7.8/10
GameSpy	4.5/5
GameZone	9.1/10
IGN	8.5/10
Official U.S. PlayStation Magazine	5/5
X-Play	5/5
Entertainment Weekly	A−
Playboy	85%

Sly Cooper and the Thievius Raccoonus received "generally favorable" reviews, according to review aggregator Metacritic. Most reviewers praised the unique look of the game. GameSpot noted that "The game has a fantastic sense of style to its design that is reflected in everything from the animation to the unique use of the peaking fad, cel-shaded polygons." Many reviews also appreciated the ease of learning the controls and gameplay; IGN stated that "Sly is incredibly responsive, and though his size seems a little large at times due to his long arms and legs and the cane he carries, skillfully jumping and hitting enemies with precision is a quick study." Several reviewers appreciated the fluidity of the game between actual play, cutscenes, and other features. The game was also praised for being a game that was accessible to both adults and children.

A common detraction of the game was its length; as commented by GameSpot's review, "The main problem is that just as you're getting into a groove and really enjoying the variety seen throughout the different levels, the game ends." The length was defended by Sucker Punch Productions's developers; Brian Flemming noted that there was additional content to be unlocked at several levels, including "for each [Master Sprint] you complete, you get bonus commentary from the designers, artists, and programmers here at Sucker Punch, something that people have reacted to really positively." However, 1Up.com actually liked the game's length and wrote "The extra stuff really helps stretch things out, though, and if you're anything like me, you'll happily sit for another 10 hours to do so." The game was also cited as being too easy, with GameSpot stating that "The game's relative ease combined with a very short length prevents Sly Cooper from becoming the next big platformer. But it's great while it lasts." However, Official U.S. PlayStation Magazine noted that in regards to the difficulty "There's a pleasant old-school feel to Thievius Raccoonus; the enemies are merciless but a bit stupid, and the platforming challenges come on strong and ramp up steadily in difficulty as the levels go by." Reviewers also noted some framerate slowdowns in latter levels of the game, as well as some camera control issues.

=== Sales and accolades ===
For their "Best and Worst of 2002" awards, GameSpot nominated the game for "Best Game No One Played on PlayStation 2" and "Best Platformer". For IGN's Best of 2002, Sly Cooper was the runner-up for "Best Platformer" and nominated for "Special Achievements for Graphics". In 2003, GameSpy ranked 22 in their "25 Most Underrated Games of All Time". In 2008, IGN ranked the game 21 in its "Top 25 PS2 Games". During the 6th Annual Interactive Achievement Awards, the Academy of Interactive Arts & Sciences (AIAS) awarded Sly Cooper with "Outstanding Achievement in Animation" and "Outstanding Achievement in Art Direction", along with a nomination for "Console Platform Action/Adventure Game of the Year".

The game sold over 400,000 copies within a year since its release and was republished under Sony Computer Entertainment's Greatest Hits line in 2003. By July 2006, Sly Cooper and the Thievius Raccoonus had sold 800,000 copies and earned $21 million in the United States. Next Generation ranked it as the 78th highest-selling game launched for the sixth generation of video game consoles.

== Sequels and other appearances ==
The game has yielded three sequels, Sly 2: Band of Thieves (2004), Sly 3: Honor Among Thieves (2005) and Sly Cooper: Thieves in Time (2013). Sly Cooper and the Thievius Raccoonus won "Best New Character" and was nominated for "Excellence in Visual Arts" at the 2003 Game Developers Conference (GDC) for 2002. The character of Sly Cooper has also been come to be considered as a mascot for the PlayStation systems, alongside both Ratchet & Clank and Jak and Daxter. This has led to collaboration between the development teams for all three series, Sucker Punch Productions, Insomniac Games, and Naughty Dog.
