= Rocket: Robot on Wheels =

1999 video game

- North American Nintendo 64 box art
- Developer: Sucker Punch Productions
- Publisher: Ubi Soft
- Producer: Brian Fleming
- Designer: Don Munsil
- Artist: Dev Madan (Note: Madan is credited with "Art and Modeling" in the game's instruction manual, along with six others. (Note: Nate Fox, Irvin Gee, Reid Johnson, Dev Madan, Rob McDaniel, Augie Pagan, Karin Yamagiwa) In an interview with Nintendo Life in 2014, Madan is referred to as the game's Art Director.)
- Composer: Julian Soule
- Platform: Nintendo 64
- Release: NA: November 17, 1999; EU: December 17, 1999
- Genre: Platform
- Mode: Single-player

Rocket: Robot on Wheels is a 1999 platform game developed by Sucker Punch Productions and published by Ubi Soft for the Nintendo 64. In it, the player controls Rocket, the titular robot. Rocket: Robot on Wheels was the first game on a home console to use a realistic physics engine to drive the gameplay. The player can solve puzzles dealing with mass, inertia, friction, and other physical properties.

Rocket received generally positive reviews from critics, but failed to be profitable. It was the first game developed by Sucker Punch, and remains the only game the studio has developed for a non-Playstation console.

== Gameplay ==
Screenshot showing Rocket navigating through Clowny Island

The player controls Rocket, a maintenance robot with a unicycle-like lower body who uses abilities such as helmet-mounted tractor beam to interact with items in the environment. The player collects tickets by completing objectives, such as assisting non-player characters, completing minigames, solving puzzles, or collecting all the tokens in a world. The game has seven themed worlds, including a central hub world through which the other six are accessed. Each world contains 12 tickets and 200 tokens to collect. Tickets act as the main objective for each level and appear after the player solves a major puzzle or completes a challenge. A certain amount of tickets must be collected to open new worlds, while tokens can be exchanged given to Tinker the Repair Robot in exchange for new abilities. Booster packs can also be collected to increase Rocket's maximum health. Each world also has seven machine parts that can be collected to fix a vehicle Jojo has disassembled. The player controls these vehicles to solve problems and gain access to new areas to obtain tickets, including a hot-dog-shaped car in the first world, and a chariot that can shoot paintballs in the second. The paintballs are used to change the color of the environment, objects, and even sheep in the level. Changing an object's colors would remain semi-permanent, which was uncommon with games at the time, and changing a sheep's color would modify the creatures behavior.

Rocket's main method of interacting with objects in the world is via his tractor beam. The player can use it to pick up, smash, and throw in-game items and swing from platforms. When holding an item with the tractor beam, a crosshair can be used to show the trajectory of an item when tossed. The game features a realistic physics engine, which controls how items, vehicles, and Rocket himself react to interactions with other objects.

The game's camera generally follows from a third person perspective, but also allows players to use a near-first person view at times.

== Plot ==
Rocket is a maintenance robot created by Dr. Gavin, the architect and owner of the Whoopie World extragalactic theme park. On the night before opening day, Gavin goes to a party, leaving Rocket in charge of the park and its two animal mascots: Whoopie the walrus and his sidekick Jojo the raccoon. Jojo, envious of Whoopie, secretly plots to ruin opening day and rebrand the park as Jojo World. As soon as Gavin leaves, Jojo escapes his cage, clobbers Rocket with a mallet, and grabs all of the park's tickets and tokens. Jojo abducts Whoopie and flees into the park, sabotaging the attractions and causing them to go haywire. Rocket gives chase and begins exploring the many areas of the park, working to find the stolen tickets and tokens so he can catch Jojo and rescue Whoopie before Gavin returns.

After finding many of the missing tickets and tokens, Rocket confronts and defeats Jojo, freeing Whoopie just as Gavin returns. Gavin commends Rocket for his hard work before leaving again to repair Jojo's damage to the park before it opens. If the player finds all the tickets and tokens, Rocket is honored by Gavin for his achievements by renaming the park RocketLand, much to Whoopie's dismay.

== Development ==
Chris Zimmerman, one of Sucker Punch's co-founders, in 2026. Rocket's game designer Don Munsil credited Zimmerman with the vision and implementation of the game's physics engine.

Sucker Punch Productions was founded in 1997, after the studio's founders left their jobs at Microsoft. The studio decided to develop a game for the Nintendo 64 under the code name Puzzle Factory. The idea originally revolved around creating a 3D version of The Incredible Machine, although this idea was soon dropped. Sucker Punch self-financed their first year of development and spent around a year creating the first level of what would become Rocket before pitching the game to publishers.

The basic concept of Rocket: Robot on Wheels was created by the founders of Sucker Punch, Chris Zimmerman, Brian Fleming and Bruce Oberg. Zimmerman envisioned a full-scale physics engine on the N64, which was emphasized to create a game that felt unique. The studio wanted to create a game where the player's interactions with the environment were highlighted. Sucker Punch said the core gameplay was inspired by Super Mario 64 and Banjo-Kazooie and described the game in pitches as "Super Mario 64 meets The Incredible Machine" as the game was designed to be "slightly more puzzle-y than your average platformer." The game's soundtrack was inspired by funk music. Don Munsil, Rocket's game designer, said that his love for theme parks is what inspired the game's setting, in addition to giving the game a way to have multiple stages without being an "obvious rip-off of Mario 64".

Co-founder Brian Fleming said the team chose to develop for the N64 as they felt they lacked the artistic skills necessary to take advantage of the power of the PlayStation or Sega Saturn. The team also felt that competition was lower on the N64, with less games being released for it than on the PlayStation or PC. However, the team occasionally thought that the game wouldn't run properly on the system, since getting the physics engine to run on its underpowered processor was challenging. Don Munsil said that Nintendo didn't think the physics engine Rocket employed was possible on the N64. The team went to Nintendo to pitch the game but were rejected and refused access to the necessary tools to develop a game for the console, including development kits and tool libraries. Sucker Punch was surprised by the process of getting permission from Nintendo to develop the game, which they described as being more secretive than "the next generation unreleased Windows."

Without access to the necessary tools, the studio developed a prototype of the game using a PC, something they were comfortable doing being ex-Microsoft engineers. The prototype included a Windows demo which used joysticks meant to imitate play on an N64 controller. The demo was completed four or five months after the studio was founded, which by this time had around twelve employees. The developers pitched the prototype of the game, at the time titled Sprocket, to Nintendo and received development kits, but Nintendo refused to publish the game.

The studio, now having grown to include eighteen staff, began pitching the game to "everybody". In late 1998 or early 1999, they pitched to Sony Computer Entertainment, who was impressed with it, but were against Sucker Punch's wishes for the game to be released on N64 and later ported to the PlayStation. Nervous about both the concept not being mascot-centric and a potential game being on their biggest competitor's system, Sony declined. So, Sucker Punch continued to pitch it to other publishers, including Activision and Acclaim.

In the weeks prior to E3 1999, the studio had a close deal fall through with THQ. Sucker Punch then began talks with Electronic Arts (EA) and were on the cusp of breaking a deal. However, EA's terms required that Sucker Punch abandon Rocket, and begin developing a PlayStation 2 title instead. The team ultimately declined the offer, as they didn't want to throw away the game after spending so much time and their own money producing it. Still having yet to secure a publisher, Sucker Punch brought Rocket to E3 to present the game themselves. The team produced their own press kits, documentation, and spoke to as many press outlets as they could. This ultimately proved successful, as they received positive coverage in gaming outlets such as IGN, who gave it their N64 "Sleeper Hit of E3" award. The positive coverage caught the attention of Ubi Soft, who finally agreed to publish the game. In hindsight, the developers lament pitching the game when mostly complete and massively underestimating the process of getting a publisher. Ubi Soft announced their agreement to publish Rocket on July 16, 1999.

The game had initially been developed under the title Sprocket until three months before its release, when it was changed due to a trademark conflict with Game Sprockets. On a Q&A on the game's official website, the team stated that they changed the name "Because of lawyers. We didn't want to, but we were told by our lawyers that we had to. Don't you know that everything you don't want to do is because of lawyers? If your mom or dad is a lawyer, you'd know what I mean."

Rocket: Robot on Wheels was featured at the annual CBS Toy Test in Seattle during the week of August 9, 1999.

== Reception ==
Reception

Aggregate score
Aggregator	Score
GameRankings	82%

Review scores
Publication	Score
AllGame	3/5
CNET Gamecenter	8/10
Electronic Gaming Monthly	7.125/10 (Note: Four critics of Electronic Gaming Monthly gave the game each a score of 6.5/10, 9/10, 7/10, and 6/10.)
Game Informer	8/10
GameFan	(L.B.) 92% (J.W.) 88%
GameSpot	7.6/10
Hyper	84%
IGN	9/10
N64 Magazine	88%
Next Generation	3/5
Nintendo Power	8.4/10

The game received "favorable" reviews according to the review aggregation website GameRankings. Critics were particularly impressed with the game's physics. Matt Casamassina of IGN called the game's physics "one of the most amazing technical achievements in a Nintendo 64 game to date." Lou Gubrious of GamePro said in one review that the game "works so well precisely because it is so different from the typical platform game. The realism of the gameplay, set in the surreal world of a cartoony theme park, makes this a game well worth any gamer's time." (Note: GamePro gave the game two 4.5/5 scores for graphics and fun factor, 3.5/5 for sound, and 4/5 for control.) However, Boba Fatt said in another review that the game's interface "is far more challenging than its puzzles or obstacles, making Rocket just one long, unrewarding exercise in tedium." (Note: GamePro gave the game 3/5 for graphics, 2.5/5 for sound, 1/5 for control, and 2/5 for fun factor in another review.) Criticism was also directed to the lack of voiced dialogue in the game, as well as the camera controls.

Writing for the Toronto Star, Bret Dawson said that "everything moves with an uncanny realism... add[ing] a completely new dimension to the... genre." Writing for The Brownsville Herald, Lou Kesten called Rocket "enormously clever" and ranked it as the tenth best video game of 1999. Critics also praised the game's graphical presentation. Several reviewers wrote that the game had the presentation of a children's game but played as if it were intended for adults.

Sucker Punch co-founder Chris Zimmerman called Rocket's release "somewhat successful". Despite receiving overall positive critical reception, the game failed to turn a profit. The game's designer, Don Munsil, reflected that it "didn't sell as well as it could have... and that was partially our fault". Edge magazine reported that the game had completely gone unnoticed by them, as Ubi Soft "made no effort to bring the game to [our] attention, presumably because of its overtly child-friendly overtones." By the time Edge assessed the game in July, 2000, they reported that the game could already be found brand new for £10, having launched at a price of £40.

=== Legacy ===
Sucker Punch has included Easter eggs referencing Rocket in some of their later releases. In the studio's second release, Sly Cooper and the Thievius Raccoonus, box art for Rocket appears as textures in Muggshot's level in the second world. In their 2025 game, Ghost of Yōtei, players can find a mural depicting a man wearing purple and red and riding on a wheel, similar to protagonist of the 1999 game.

In an interview discussing the character design of Sly Cooper with Animation Magazine, Dev Madan, art director for Rocket, called the game's villain Jojo "the godfather of Sly".

Rocket: Robot on Wheels remains the only game developed by Sucker Punch not exclusively for Sony's PlayStation console line. The studio was acquired by Sony in 2011.

Despite its poor sales performance, Rocket has received favorable retrospective coverage in the years following its release. The game was listed as the "18th Best Nintendo 64 Game of All Time" in Nintendo Power's 20th anniversary issue in 2008. Rocket appears in the 2010 book, 1001 Video Games You Must Play Before You Die, with Keith Stuart writing that it "has ideas that are ahead of its time". In a retrospective review, Martin Watts of Nintendo Life gave the game a perfect score, saying that some of its puzzles outshine the best from Nintendo and Rare. In 2016, Rolling Stone celebrated Rocket for being the first console game to have realistic physics, which went on to be commonplace in games. Writing for Retro Gamer in 2026, Darran Jones said that Rocket should be considered one of the top three platformers on the N64 alongside Super Mario 64 and Banjo-Kazooie.

== Bibliography ==
- Rocket: Robot on Wheels - Instruction Booklet. Ubi Soft. 1999 – via Internet Archive.
