= Cross-buy =

Digital distribution feature

Cross-buy is a feature of some digital distribution systems available across multiple device platforms, where users who purchase a license to a specific piece of software are able to use the versions of the software for different device classes at no additional charge.

The term is associated mainly with digital distribution in video games, where cross-buy can span between a video game console and handheld game console, or between a console and a personal computer.

== Examples ==
Sony Interactive Entertainment introduced cross-buy on PlayStation gaming platforms in August 2012: users who purchased select PlayStation 3 titles would be able to obtain ports for the portable PlayStation Vita console at no additional charge. The initiative was later extended to include PlayStation 4 and PlayStation 5.

Microsoft unveiled a similar scheme Xbox Play Anywhere in 2016, which is applicable to digital purchases of games on Microsoft Store across Windows 10, Xbox One, and Xbox Series X/S attached to the same account. This also includes synchronization of content, such as saves and achievements between all platforms. This arrangement is primarily used on first-party titles, but Resident Evil 7: Biohazard became the first third-party title to support Play Anywhere.

Meta Quest, formerly Oculus has a similar concept of cross-buy for Virtual Reality (VR) experiences bought on the Oculus PC VR platform for the Rift and Rift S headsets. PC VR Experiences which have subsequently appeared for the mobile virtual reality headsets Quest and Quest 2 can be made available to Quest/Quest 2 consumers without having to be bought a second time; however, the decision to support cross-buy lies with the game developers.

== See also ==
- Digital Copy, a similar concept for films.
