= 23rd Annual D.I.C.E. Awards =

Video game award ceremony

- Date: February 13, 2020
- Venue: Aria Resort and Casino
- Country: Paradise, Nevada, USA
- Hosted by: Jessica Chobot and Greg Miller

Highlights
- Most awards: Control (4)
- Most nominations: Control; Death Stranding (8)
- Game of the Year: Untitled Goose Game
- Hall of Fame: Connie Booth

The 23rd Annual D.I.C.E. Awards was the 23rd edition of the D.I.C.E. Awards, an annual awards event that honored the best games in the video game industry during 2019. The awards were arranged by the Academy of Interactive Arts & Sciences (AIAS), and were held at the Aria Resort and Casino in Paradise, Nevada on February 13, 2020. It was also held as part of the Academy's 2020 D.I.C.E. Summit, and was co-hosted by Jessica Chobot of Nerdist News, and Kinda Funny co-founder Greg Miller.

The award for "Outstanding Achievement in Sound Design" was relabeled as "Outstanding Achievement in Audio Design".

Untitled Goose Game won "Game of the Year". Control won the most awards and was tied with Death Stranding for having the most nominations. Sony Interactive Entertainment received the most nominations as a publisher, while Nintendo had published the most nominated games. Remedy Entertainment was the most award-winning developer. Nintendo and 505 Games were the most award-winning publishers with Nintendo publishing the most award-winning games. Respawn Entertainment and Nintendo EPD were the only developers with more than one award-winning game. The Mario franchise had three award-winning titles: Super Mario Maker 2 won "Family Game of the Year", Mario Kart Tour won "Racing Game of the Year", and Luigi's Mansion 3 won "Outstanding Achievement in Animation".

Connie Booth, vice-president of Sony Interactive Entertainment, was inducted into the Academy's Hall of Fame.

== Winners and Nominees ==
Winners are listed first, highlighted in boldface, and indicated with a double dagger (‡).

=== Game of the Year awards ===
**Game of the Year**: **Untitled Goose Game (House House, Panic Inc.) — Michael McMaster, Jake Strasser, Nico Disseldorp, Stuart Gillespie-Cook**‡; Control (Remedy Entertainment, 505 Games) — Juha Vainio, Mikael Kasurinen; Death Stranding (Kojima Productions, Sony Interactive Entertainment) — Hideo Kojima; Disco Elysium (ZA/UM) — Robert Kurvitz, Aleksander Rostov, Kaur Kender, Tönis Haavel; Outer Wilds (Mobius Digital, Annapurna Interactive) — Loan Verneau, Alex Beachum	**Online Game of the Year**: **Apex Legends (Respawn Entertainment, Electronic Arts) — Todd Alderman, Drew McCoy, Chad Grenier, Vince Zampella**‡; Call of Duty: Modern Warfare (Infinity Ward, Activision) — Patrick Kelly, Dave Stohl; Destiny 2: Shadowkeep (Bungie) — Mark Noseworthy, Luke Smith; Tetris 99 (Arika, Nintendo) — Akira Kinashi, Ryuhei Hirota; Wargroove (Chucklefish) — Lili Ibrahim, Finn Brice
**Portable Game of the Year**: **Sayonara Wild Hearts (Simogo, Annapurna Interactive) — Simon Flesser, Magnus Gardebäck**‡; Call of Duty: Mobile (TiMi Studio Group, Activision) — Matt Lewis, Fei Ao, Jeremiah Maza; Grindstone (Capybara Games) — Nathan Vella, Dan Vader, Matt Repetski, Kris Piotrowski; Sky: Children of the Light (Thatgamecompany) — Jenova Chen; What the Golf? (Triband, The Label) — Tim Garbos, Peter Bruun, Lasse Astrup, Felix Nordanåker, Óscar Losada, Morten Skouboe, Rune K. Drewsen	**Outstanding Achievement for an Independent Game**: **Untitled Goose Game (House House, Panic Inc.) — Michael McMaster, Jake Strasser, Nico Disseldorp, Stuart Gillespie-Cook**‡; A Short Hike — Adam Robinson-Yu; Disco Elysium (ZA/UM) — Robert Kurvitz, Aleksander Rostov, Kaur Kender, Tönis Haavel; Sayonara Wild Hearts (Simogo, Annapurna Interactive) — Simon Flesser, Magnus Gardebäck; What the Golf? (Triband, The Label) — Tim Garbos, Peter Bruun, Lasse Astrup, Felix Nordanåker, Óscar Losada, Morten Skouboe, Rune K. Drewsen

=== Immersive Reality awards ===
**Immersive Reality Game of the Year**: **Pistol Whip (Cloudhead Games) — Denny Unger, Joel Green, Cameron Oltmann, Dan Taylor, Antony Stevens**‡; Asgard's Wrath (Sanzaru Games, Oculus Studios) — William A. Spence IV, Glen Egan, Mat T. Kraemer, Grace Morales Lingad; Blood & Truth (SIE London Studio) — Stuart Whyte; The Curious Tale of Stolen Pets (Fast Travel Games) — James Hunt; Trover Saves the Universe (Squanch Games) — Tanya Watson, Justin Roiland, Erich Meyr, Mikey Spano	**Immersive Reality Technical Achievement**: **Blood & Truth (SIE London Studio) — Will Burdon, Mark Lintott**‡; Asgard's Wrath (Sanzaru Games, Oculus Studios) — Jean-Francois Lepine, Evan Arnold, Jenny Huang, Carlos Hurtado, Dan Halpern; Pistol Whip (Cloudhead Games) — Paul White, Cameron Oltmann, Jonathan Hackett, Mat Lyon, Christopher Roe; Stormland (Insomniac Games, Oculus Studios) — Mike Daly, Duncan Moore; Westworld Awakening (Survios, Warner Bros. Interactive Entertainment) — Lisa Ohanian, James Iliff, Daniel Zeligman

=== Craft awards ===
**Outstanding Achievement in Game Direction**: **Control (Remedy Entertainment, 505 Games) — Mikael Kasurinen**‡; A Short Hike — Adam Robinson-Yu; Disco Elysium (ZA/UM) — Robert Kurvitz, Aleksander Rostov; Outer Wilds (Mobius Digital, Annapurna Interactive) — Alex Beachum; Untitled Goose Game (House House, Panic Inc.) — Michael McMaster, Jake Strasser, Nico Disseldorp, Stuart Gillespie-Cook	**Outstanding Achievement in Game Design**: **Baba Is You (Hempuli) — Arvi Teikari**‡; Disco Elysium (ZA/UM) — Robert Kurvitz, Aleksander Rostov, Kaur Kender, Tőnis Haavel; Outer Wilds (Mobius Digital, Annapurna Interactive) — Loan Verneau; Sekiro: Shadows Die Twice (FromSoftware, Activision) — Hidetaka Miyazaki; Slay the Spire (MegaCrit, Humble Bundle) — Casey Yano, Anthony Giovannetti
**Outstanding Achievement in Animation**: **Luigi's Mansion 3 (Next Level Games, Nintendo) — Marie Wyatt**‡; Call of Duty: Modern Warfare (Infinity Ward, Activision) — Mark Grigsby, Jason Greenberg; Days Gone (SIE Bend Studio) — Jake Spence, Emmanuel Roth; Death Stranding (Kojima Productions, Sony Interactive Entertainment) — Masaaki Kawata; Devil May Cry 5 (Capcom) — Yuichiro Hiraki	**Outstanding Achievement in Art Direction**: **Control (Remedy Entertainment, 505 Games) — Janne Pulkkinen**‡; Call of Duty: Modern Warfare (Infinity Ward, Activision) — Joel Emslie; Concrete Genie (Pixelopus, Sony Interactive Entertainment) — Jeff Sangalli; Death Stranding (Kojima Productions, Sony Interactive Entertainment) — Yoji Shinkawa; Resident Evil 2 (Capcom) — Satoshi Takamatsu, Yoshitsugu Tanaka, Tomonori Takano
**Outstanding Achievement in Character**: **The Goose, Untitled Goose Game (House House, Panic Inc.) — Michael McMaster, Jake Strasser, Nico Disseldorp, Stuart Gillespie-Cook**‡; Jesse Faden, Control (Remedy Entertainment, 505 Games) — Voice actor Courtney Hope; writer Sam Lake; Cliff Unger, Death Stranding (Kojima Productions, Sony Interactive Entertainment) — Voice actor Mads Mikkelsen; writer Hideo Kojima; Sam Porter Bridges, Death Stranding (Kojima Productions, Sony Interactive Entertainment) — Voice actor Norman Reedus; writer Hideo Kojima; Greez, Star Wars Jedi: Fallen Order (Respawn Entertainment, Electronic Arts) — Voice actor Daniel Roebuck; narrative lead Aaron Contreras; head of Respawn Entertainment Vince Zampella	**Outstanding Achievement in Original Music Composition**: **Control (Remedy Entertainment, 505 Games) — Petri Alanko, Martin Stig Andersen**‡; Arise: A Simple Story (Piccolo Studio, Techland) — David Garcia; Erica (Flavourworks, Sony Interactive Entertainment) — Austin Wintory; Golem (Highwire Games) — Martin O'Donnell; Mortal Kombat 11 (NetherRealm Studios, Warner Bros. Interactive Entertainment) — Wilbert Roget II, Dan Forden, Nathan Grigg
**Outstanding Achievement in Audio Design**: **Death Stranding (Kojima Productions, Sony Interactive Entertainment) — Mike Niederquell, Ludvig Forssel**‡; Call of Duty: Modern Warfare (Infinity Ward, Activision) — Stephen Miller; Mortal Kombat 11 (NetherRealm Studios, Warner Bros. Interactive Entertainment) — Rich Carle, Dan Forden, Stephen Schappler; Resident Evil 2 (Capcom) — Shusaku Uchiyama, Shohei Miyata; Sayonara Wild Hearts (Simogo, Annapurna Interactive) — Daniel Olsen	**Outstanding Achievement in Story**: **Disco Elysium (ZA/UM) — Robert Kurvitz, Helen Hindpere, Argo Tuulik, Cash DeCuir, Olga Moskvina, Siim Sinamae, Justin Keenan, Andrus Laansalu**‡; Control (Remedy Entertainment, 505 Games) — Sam Lake; Outer Wilds (Mobius Digital, Annapurna Interactive) — Kelsey Beachum; Telling Lies (Sam Barlow, Annapurna Interactive) — Sam Barlow, Amelia Gray; The Outer Worlds (Obsidian Entertainment, Private Division) — Carrie Patel, Megan Starks, Nitai Poddar, Daniel McPhee, Paul Kirsch, Kate Dollarhyde, Chris L'Etoile, Tim Cain, Leonard Boyarsky
**Outstanding Technical Achievement**: **Death Stranding (Kojima Productions, Sony Interactive Entertainment) — Hiroaki Yoshlike, Tsutomu Hashiguchi**‡; Call of Duty: Modern Warfare (Infinity Ward, Activision) — Michal Drobot, Dan Nelson; Concrete Genie (Pixelopus, Sony Interactive Entertainment) — David Lee Swenson, Zun "Eric" Zhang; Control (Remedy Entertainment, 505 Games) — Sean Donnelly, Tatu Aalto; Metro Exodus (4A Games, Deep Silver) — Oleksandr Shyshkovtsov

=== Genre awards ===
**Action Game of the Year**: **Control (Remedy Entertainment, 505 Games) — Juha Vainio, Mikael Kasurinen**‡; Call of Duty: Modern Warfare (Infinity Ward, Activision) — Patrick Kelly, Dave Stohl; Devil May Cry 5 (Capcom) — Matt Walker, Michiteru Okabe, Hideaki Itsuno; Gears 5 (The Coalition, Xbox Game Studios) — Rod Fergusson, Mike Rayner, Matt Searcy, Ryan Cleven; Sekiro: Shadows Die Twice (FromSoftware, Activision) — Robert Conkey, Yuzo Kojima, Hidetaka Miyazaki, Kazuhiro Hamatani	**Adventure Game of the Year**: **Star Wars Jedi: Fallen Order (Respawn Entertainment, Electronic Arts) — Stig Asmussen, Brandon Kelch, Jason de Heras, Jeff Magers, Aaron Contreras**‡; Death Stranding (Kojima Productions, Sony Interactive Entertainment) — Hideo Kojima; Luigi's Mansion 3 (Next Level Games, Nintendo) — Kensuke Tanabe, Bryce Holliday, Yoshihito Ikebata; Resident Evil 2 (Capcom) — Yoshiaki Hirabayashi, Tsuyoshi Kanda, Kazunori Kadoi, Yasuhiro Anpo; The Legend of Zelda: Link's Awakening (Grezzo, Nintendo) — Eiji Aonuma, Mikiharu Oiwa
**Family Game of the Year**: **Super Mario Maker 2 (Nintendo EPD) — Takashi Tezuka, Toshiyuki Kusakihara, Genki Yokota, Shigefumi Hino, Satoko Higashi**‡; A Short Hike — Adam Robinson-Yu; Dragon Quest Builders 2 (Square Enix, Omega Force) — Yuji Horii, Akira Toriyama, Koichi Sugiyama, Noriyoshi Fujimoto, Takuma Shiraishi, Kazuya Niinou; Ring Fit Adventure (Nintendo EPD) — Koichi Kawamoto, Hiroshi Matsunaga; Yoshi's Crafted World (Good-Feel, Nintendo) — Takashi Tezuka, Etsunobu Ebisu, Masahiro Yamamoto	**Fighting Game of the Year**: **Mortal Kombat 11 (NetherRealm Studios, Warner Bros. Interactive Entertainment) — Ed Boon, Shaun Himmerick**‡; Dead or Alive 6 (Team Ninja, Koei Tecmo) — Yohei Shimbori, Yutaka Saito, Akihiro Nakamura; Jump Force (Spike Chunsoft, Bandai Namco Entertainment) — Hiroyuki Kaneko, Toyokazu Sakamoto; Samurai Shodown (SNK) — Nobuyuki Kuroki, Hidetoshi Ishizawa, Yuji Watanabe, Kaito Soranaka
**Racing Game of the Year**: **Mario Kart Tour (DeNA, Nintendo EPD) — Hideki Konno, Kosuke Yabuki, Yugo Hayashi, Shinya Fujiwara**‡; Crash Team Racing Nitro-Fueled (Beenox, Activision) — Stéphane Gravel, Thomas Wilson, Philippe Turcotte; Dirt Rally 2.0 (Codemasters) — Geoff Smith, Ross Gowing, Gary Buckley; F1 2019 (Codemasters) — Christopher Gray, Lee Mather, Gavin Cooper; Trials Rising (RedLynx, Ubisoft Kyiv) — Mikko Lindholm, Antti Ilvessuo	**Role-Playing Game of the Year**: **The Outer Worlds (Obsidian Entertainment, Private Division) — Eric DeMilt, Tim Cain, Leonard Boyarsky**‡; Disco Elysium (ZA/UM) — Robert Kurvitz, Aleksander Rostov, Kaur Kender, Tõnis Haavel; Final Fantasy XIV: Shadowbringers (Square Enix) — Naoki Yoshida; Kingdom Hearts III (Square Enix) — Tetsuya Nomura, Tai Yasue; Pokémon Sword and Shield (Game Freak, Nintendo) — Junichi Masuda, Shigeru Ohmori
**Sports Game of the Year**: **FIFA 20 (EA Vancouver, EA Romania) — Aaron McHardy, Matt Prior**‡; Madden NFL 20 (EA Tiburon) — Michael Young, Seann Graddy; MLB The Show 19 (SIE San Diego) — Marcus Eftin, Nick Livingston, Jason Villa; NBA 2K20 (Visual Concepts, 2K Games) — Andrew H. Marrinson, Jeffrey J. Thomas, Mike Wang; NHL 20 (EA Vancouver) — William Ho, Sean Ramjagsingh	**Strategy/Simulation Game of the Year**: **Fire Emblem: Three Houses (Intelligent Systems, Nintendo) — Hitoshi Yamagami, Masahiro Higuchi, Takashi Morinaka, Toshiyuki Kusakihara, Genki Yokota, Naoko Horie**‡; Anno 1800 (Ubisoft Mainz) — Burkhard Ratheiser, Dirk Riegert, Jan Dungel; Oxygen Not Included (Klei Entertainment) — Jamie Cheng, Alia McCutcheon, Johann Seidenz, Ju-Lian Kwan, Graham; Slay the Spire (MegaCrit, Humble Bundle) — Casey Yano, Anthony Giovannetti; Total War: Three Kingdoms (Creative Assembly, Sega) — Janos Gaspar, Attila Mohacsi, Mike Simpson

=== Special awards ===
==== Hall of Fame ====
- Connie Booth

=== Multiple nominations and awards ===
==== Multiple Nominations ====
Games that received multiple nominations
Nominations	Game
8	Control
8	Death Stranding
6	Call of Duty: Modern Warfare
6	Disco Elysium
4	Outer Wilds
4	Untitled Goose Game
3	A Short Hike
3	Mortal Kombat 11
3	Resident Evil 2
3	Sayonara Wild Hearts
2	Asgard's Wrath
2	Blood & Truth
2	Concrete Genie
2	Devil May Cry 5
2	Luigi's Mansion 3
2	Pistol Whip
2	Sekiro: Shadows Die Twice
2	Slay the Spire
2	Star Wars Jedi: Fallen Order
2	The Outer Worlds
2	What the Golf?

Nominations by company
Nominations	Games	Company
15	6	Sony Interactive Entertainment
10	4	Activision
9	8	Nintendo
8	3	Annapurna Interactive
8	1	505 Games
8	1	Kojima Productions
8	1	Remedy Entertainment
6	5	Electronic Arts
6	1	Infinity Ward
6	1	ZA/UM
5	2	Capcom
4	1	House House
4	1	Mobius Digital
4	1	Panic Inc.
3	3	Square Enix
3	2	Respawn Entertainment
3	2	Oculus Studios
3	1	Adam Robinson-Yu
3	1	NetherRealm Studios
3	1	Simogo
3	1	Warner Bros. Interactive Entertainment
2	2	Codemasters
2	2	Ubisoft
2	1	Cloudhead Games
2	1	FromSoftware
2	1	Humble Bundle
2	1	MegaCrit
2	1	Next Level Games
2	1	Obsidian Entertainment
2	1	Pixelopus
2	1	Private Division
2	1	Sanzaru Games
2	1	The Label
2	1	Triband

==== Multiple awards ====
Games that received multiple awards
Awards	Game
4	Control
3	Untitled Goose Game
2	Death Stranding

Awards by company
Awards	Games	Company
4	4	Nintendo
4	1	505 Games
4	1	Remedy Entertainment
3	3	Electronic Arts
3	2	Sony Interactive Entertainment
3	1	House House
3	1	Panic Inc.
2	2	Respawn Entertainment
2	1	Kojima Productions
