= Connie Booth (business executive) =

American business executive

Connie Booth is an American business executive who served as vice-president of Product Development at Sony Interactive Entertainment. She had been an advocate of many of SIE's first-party franchises starting with Crash Bandicoot. She was inducted into the Academy of Interactive Arts & Sciences Hall of Fame.

== Education ==
Booth attended California Polytechnic State University – San Luis Obispo and received her Bachelor of Science (B.S.) in Business Administration.

== Career ==
Booth began her career at Sony Corporation of America in 1989, holding various positions within Sony Electronic Publishing Company. She joined Sony Computer Entertainment America in 1995 as a Producer and Executive Producer of Product Development, working closely with Naughty Dog and Universal Interactive Studios to release Crash Bandicoot, whose star became one of PlayStation's most recognizable characters.

AIAS president Meggan Scavio said "For over two decades, she has been a leading voice and advocate for countless PlayStation franchises as well as nurturing new talent in the industry. Her tireless work and passion have had an indelible impact on game makers, allowing their creative visions to flourish."

Booth has worked to incubate younger talent in the industry, including assisting Pixelopus, the developers behind PS4 exclusive Concrete Genie.

Sony confirmed reports that Booth had left the company by October 2023 after working there for 34 years. No reason had been given regarding her departure.
