= Asgard's Wrath =

2019 video game

- Developer: Sanzaru Games
- Publisher: Oculus Studios
- Platform: Microsoft Windows
- Release: October 10, 2019
- Genre: Action role-playing
- Mode: Single-player

Asgard's Wrath is a 2019 action role-playing game developed by Sanzaru Games and published by Oculus Studios for the Oculus Rift, a virtual reality headset. In the game, the player assumes control of a Norse god who must guide several mortal heroes to fulfill their destinies. The game received generally positive reviews. Asgard's Wrath 2 was released on the Meta Quest 2 and Meta Quest 3 in 2023.

== Gameplay ==
Asgard's Wrath is an action role-playing game designed for virtual reality (VR) headsets. Set in the Norse mythology, the game sees the player assuming control of a Norse god who is under the tutelage of Loki. The God must fulfill Loki's request to guide several preordained mortal heroes to fulfill their destinies. The game features five different heroes, each with its own play style and special abilities. Each hero has their own weapon, though weapons can be picked up from defeated enemies. Players swing their sword to defeat enemies and parry to deflect attacks. The weapon can be thrown at enemies and magically summoned back to the player's hand. Some of these weapons have status properties such as lightning and poison. Players need to consume food to restore health. As players explore, they can complete side missions, explore dungeons and find treasure chests and crates that can be used to craft useful materials. Players can also recruit various animals and transform them into humanoid companions, known as "followers", who can assist the players in solving puzzles and combat. Loki must give the player the ability to do so.

== Development ==
Development of the game started in Sanzaru Games in 2016 when the company was also working on another VR title, Marvel Powers United VR. A team of 90 developers worked on the title. The game's initial vision was similar to Lemmings, as the player assumes control of the Gods and solve puzzles by commanding various human characters. Oculus Studios announced the game in February 2019 and released the title for the VR headset Oculus Rift on October 10, 2019.

== Reception ==
Reception

Aggregate score
Aggregator	Score
Metacritic	88/100

Review scores
Publication	Score
IGN	9.4/10
Jeuxvideo.com	18/20

The game received generally positive reviews according to review aggregator website Metacritic. Critics praised the game's ambition and its status as a full-length title, unlike most other VR games. The game was nominated for Best VR/AR Game during The Game Awards 2019, as well as Immersive Reality Game of the Year during the 23rd Annual D.I.C.E. Awards, but lost to Beat Saber and Pistol Whip, respectively. Following the game's success, Facebook, the parent company of Oculus, announced their acquisition of Sanzaru Games in February 2020.

UploadVR praised the puzzles and the way the game incorporated them into the environment, writing, "The excellent puzzles are a great game mechanic to keep you thinking on your toes and offer a respite from the active, melee-heavy combat, but they're also a great storytelling device". IGN liked how the game added variety through switching between mortal and god forms, "There's a remarkable amount of awe to be had when what previously seemed like a towering obstacle suddenly appears small and manageable like a toy piece". Road to VR enjoyed the character animations and the way they contributed to the atmosphere.

=== Awards ===
Year	Award	Category	Result	Ref.
2019	Game Critics Awards	Best VR/AR Game	Nominated	
2019	The Game Awards 2019	Best VR/AR Game	Nominated	
2020	New York Game Awards	Coney Island Dreamland Award for Best AR/VR Game	Nominated	
2020	23rd Annual D.I.C.E. Awards	Immersive Reality Game of the Year	Nominated	
2020	23rd Annual D.I.C.E. Awards	Immersive Reality Technical Achievement	Nominated	
2020	NAVGTR Awards	Control Design, VR	Nominated	
2020	NAVGTR Awards	Sound Mixing in Virtual Reality	Nominated	
2020	20th Game Developers Choice Awards	Best VR/AR Game	Nominated	
