= A Short Hike =

2019 video game

- Designer: Adam Robinson-Yu
- Programmer: Adam Robinson-Yu
- Artists: Adam Robinson-Yu; Dawn Blair; Andrew Wong
- Composer: Mark Sparling
- Engine: Unity
- Platforms: Windows; macOS; Linux; Nintendo Switch; PlayStation 4; Xbox One
- Release: Windows, Mac, Linux; July 30, 2019; Nintendo Switch; August 18, 2020; PS4, Xbox One; November 16, 2021
- Genres: Adventure, platformer
- Mode: Single-player

A Short Hike is a 2019 adventure video game created by Canadian indie game designer Adam Robinson-Yu. Set in the fictional Hawk Peak Provincial Park, the open-world exploration game follows Claire, a young bird who sets out to reach the summit of a mountain to get a phone signal. To ascend, the player must locate Golden Feathers, which grant increased stamina for climbing, sprinting, and midair jumps. The player also interacts with various non-player characters (NPCs) along the way.

Following burnout from an earlier role-playing video game project, Robinson-Yu developed A Short Hike over several months, drawing inspiration from his personal hiking trips and the open-ended design of The Legend of Zelda: Breath of the Wild. The game features a pixelated art style and an adaptive soundtrack inspired by the music by Joe Hisaishi for Studio Ghibli films. It was initially released in April 2019 as a Humble Monthly exclusive before receiving a full release for Microsoft Windows, macOS, and Linux on the Steam and itch.io digital distribution services in July 2019. The Nintendo Switch version was released in August 2020, and the PlayStation 4 and Xbox One versions were released in November 2021.

A Short Hike was well received by critics, who praised its gameplay, island design, characters, art style, writing, and soundtrack. Some reviewers have, however, criticized the short length of the game, with one stating that it is "a bit of a blessing and a curse". The game won the Seumas McNally Grand Prize at the 2020 Independent Games Festival and earned nominations at the 2019 Golden Joystick Awards and 23rd Annual D.I.C.E. Awards.

== Gameplay ==
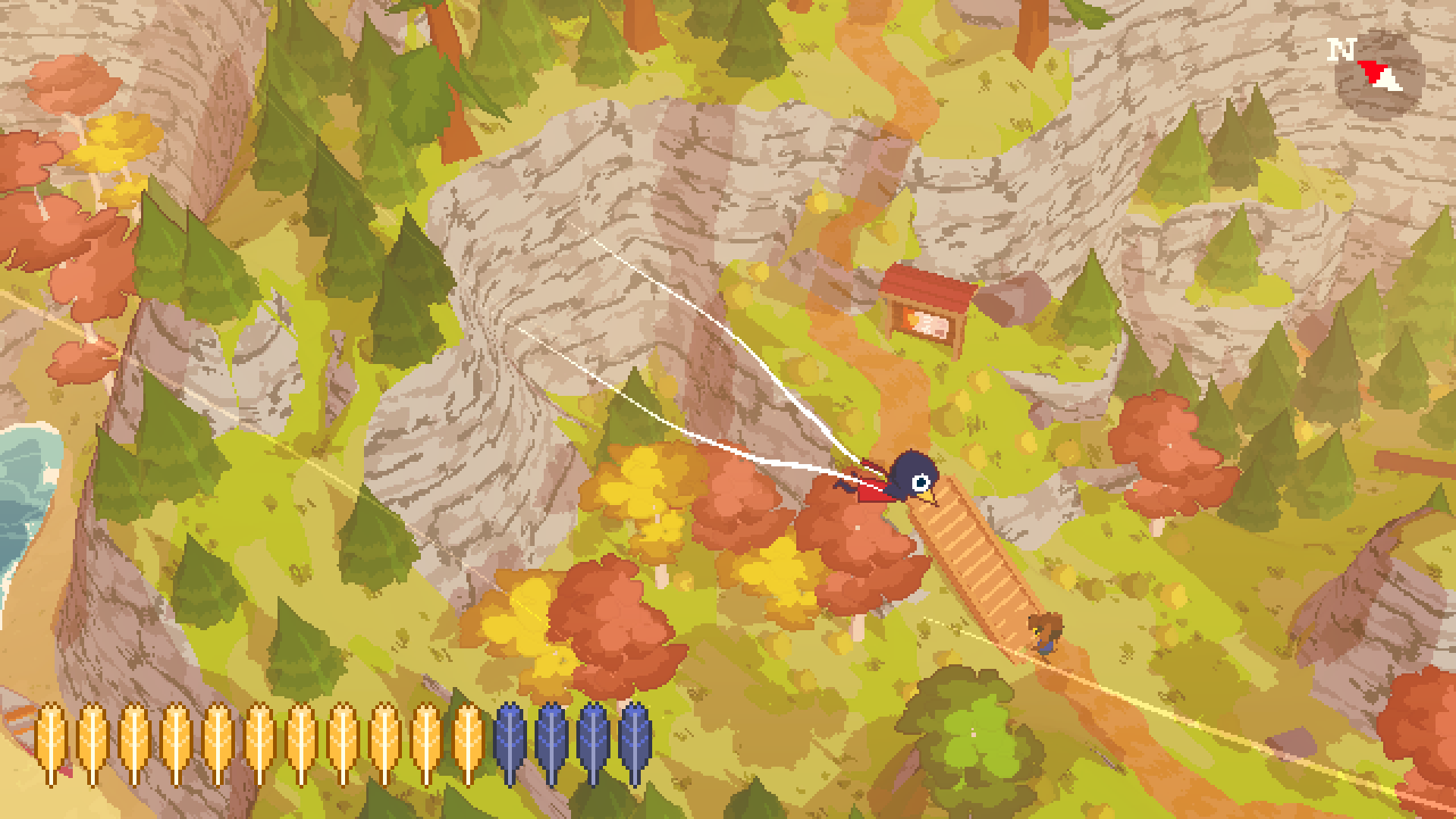
A screenshot showcasing the protagonist Claire gliding

A Short Hike is an adventure video game and platformer—a genre in which a player travels through spaces by jumping. The player controls Claire, an anthropomorphic bird who can fly, run, climb, and double jump in an open world. The goal of the game is to reach Hawk Peak's summit, and there are signs throughout the world that orient the player towards the top of the park. Claire can collect Golden Feathers, which determine her stamina when running, climbing, or performing midair jumps. Golden Feathers may also be purchased with coins. The player's stamina bar is depleted when taking an action, such as running. The bar either recharges by waiting or, when in a snowy area, by bathing in a hot spring. To achieve the summit by the established route, the player has to obtain at least seven feathers. However, it is possible, but harder, to reach the top with fewer than seven feathers. Additionally, to reach high points on the island, the player has to combine the main movement mechanics. While exploring, the player can also find "bouncy flowers" that propel the player to higher points on the island.

The world consists of several islands that form a park; some biomes include a beach, forest, and snowy mountains. The player can discover various treasures, including collectable items like coins, sticks, and shells, as well as tools such as a shovel for digging up buried treasure and a fishing rod. Items collected are stored in the player's inventory. The player may encounter non-player characters (NPCs) such as a group of children that run a marathon to the top of a hill, those that task the player with finding Golden Feathers, or those that help the player navigate the island. Some NPCs offer activities, known as minigames, that reward the player with achievements or request the player to do basic tasks. The player can also participate in races, play on the beach, or fish to earn coins.

== Plot ==
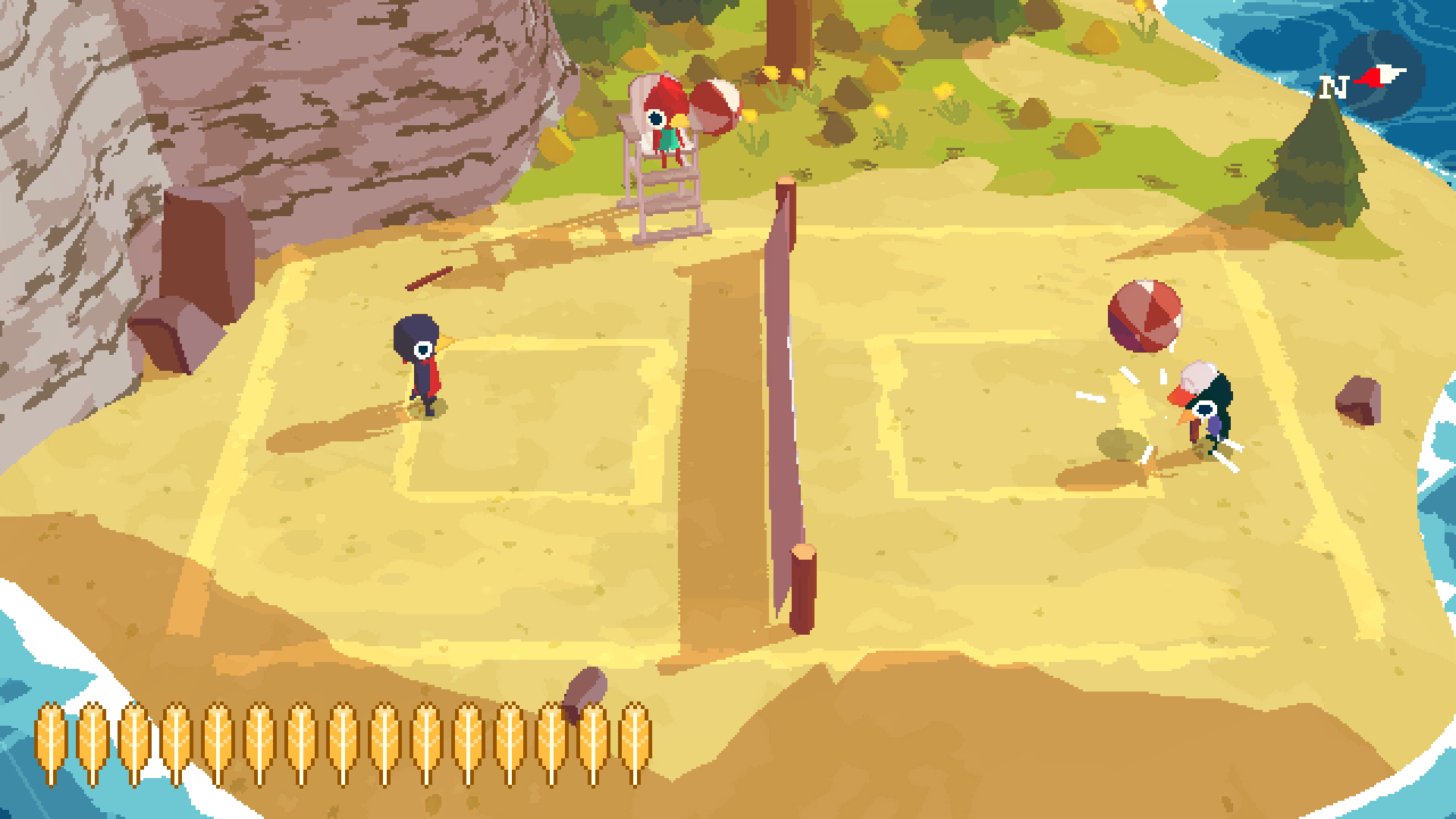
Claire can take part in many side activities while hiking, including "beach-stick-ball". Beach-stick-ball is a variant of beach volleyball where players hit the ball with sticks instead of hands.

Claire, a young bird, decides to spend her days off by travelling to Hawk Peak Provincial Park, where her aunt May works as a ranger. Claire's mother drives her to a ferry that will take her to the park for the summer. When Claire arrives, her aunt informs her that there is no cell phone reception except at Hawk Peak, the tallest point in the park. May also asks Claire to help with various tasks around the park. Claire has never hiked the Hawk Peak Trail before, but is expecting an important call, so she decides to hike to the summit. Along the way, Claire encounters several animals who ask her to perform various tasks, including finding lost objects, delivering items, and participating in recreational activities. Claire also obtains golden feathers that allow her to reach higher areas of the mountain. It is then up to the player whether Claire explores other parts of the island or head straight for Hawk Peak. A sign at the mountain's base warns it is a strenuous hike and other characters remark that the trail is too difficult for them.

When Claire reaches the peak, she congratulates herself for making it and stands in front of an aurora. Soon, her cell phone rings, revealing that the caller is her mother. She acknowledges that she had surgery after sending Claire away. Claire is upset she was not there for her, but her mother tells her she is proud of Claire for climbing Hawk Peak. The call is interrupted when an updraft emerges from the mountain. It makes Claire nervous, but her mother urges her to ride it before it disappears. Claire rides the updraft, soaring over the park. She then returns to her aunt and tells her about all her side activities during the hike. Afterwards, she goes to sleep.

== Development ==
A Short Hike's logo, created by David Czarnowski

A Short Hike was created by Adam Robinson-Yu, a Toronto-based developer, also known online as adamgryu. He was the game's programmer, art designer, level designer, sound designer, and writer. He received help from his family and friends. Dawn Blair helped him with designing models as well as with writing, while Andrew Wong contributed to some 3D models. The game's logo was created by David Czarnowski. The game was created in the Unity video game engine.

Robinson-Yu was passionate about creating video games from childhood, but only became more interested in the process while learning video game development in university. Before working on A Short Hike, Robinson-Yu released a few video games on the itch.io digital distribution service. After quitting his job as a software engineer, he became an independent video game developer in 2017. Robinson-Yu had already begun working on a role-playing video game, inspired by the Paper Mario series. He struggled with this game, growing increasingly stressed and anxious, aware that its completion could take several years. In December 2018, he stopped working on it and started on A Short Hike. After tweeting about it that month, he obtained funding for the game, but was still unsure about which project to focus on. After playing The Haunted Island (2018) and Minit (2018), he ultimately decided to work on A Short Hike full-time. (Note: After releasing A Short Hike, Robinson-Yu continued working on his role-playing game. In July 2025, he paused the work on the game indefinitely, but released a demo of the game.)

Robinson-Yu was inspired to create a hiking video game after his trips to national landmarks in North America. He wanted to incorporate the feeling of reaching the top of the mountain in the game, while trying to reconstruct "the peaceful meditative feeling" while surveying the world. However, unlike the result, he first thought about creating a simulation video game in which the player would manage their own national park, similar to the RollerCoaster Tycoon series. When at Stugan, an accelerator program for indie video game developers, he pitched a hiking game while participating in a game jam with two collaborators, ultimately creating the game The Secret of Dank Mountain. After completing it, he found navigation and route planning to be interesting design mechanics, and stated he could create a game incorporating such elements. The stamina bar featured in The Secret of Dank Mountain is similar to those of A Short Hike.

He initially thought the gameplay of A Short Hike would be boring and not attract players, feeling that similar games already existed, especially those with a strong narrative. After obtaining money for the game from the company Humble Bundle, he committed to releasing the game in the next three months. He divided the game's development cycle into three parts: alpha, beta, and release candidate. He created two sets of goals during development; the first covered core gameplay aspects, such as movement mechanics, dialogue, the save system, and cutscenes; and the second stretch goals, such as volleyball, parkour, fishing, and wildlife. Some of the stretch goals were not featured upon the game's release on Humble Bundle, but he said that the game remained enjoyable nonetheless.

Robinson-Yu found writing to be difficult. The Yarn Spinner tool was used for creating dialogue; he previously used the tool in his unfinished role-playing game. He also used a plug-in which allowed him to introduce controller support, and Cinemachine, which allowed him to set up a dynamic camera system. He re-used scripts and assets (content that includes media, artwork, animations, and sound effects) for various in-game tools from his previous projects. He also created several of his own tools during development. In conversations, he opted to use short and informal messaging, such as texting language. When creating NPCs, he intended to portray different types of anxiety and self-doubt. The game does not contain voice acting. It uses sounds that simulate speech.

=== Art style ===
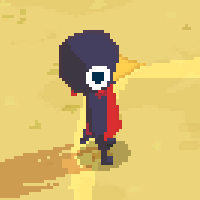
The "crunchy" pixel art style showcased on Claire

The game features a pixelated art style, with voxel and isometric graphics. The game does not use anti-aliasing, a procedure that smooths lines and removes visual distortions. One of the first things Robinson-Yu did when starting development was establish the art style. Considering that he had more experience in visual effects, he decided to experiment with a "crunchy" pixel art style. This style helped him create models much faster and expand the scope of the game in spite of his limited art skills. Robinson-Yu wanted to create a world with as few pixels as possible, while still trying to make it look beautiful. The colour palette was sampled directly from photographs of the Canadian Shield during the fall. He also created a custom shader that allowed him to control shadows on all objects, while also trying to make them look flat and consistent. Robinson-Yu used post-processing effects in the game. He noted that, without any effects, the world in the distance would contain a lot of noise. He added a fog effect (to keep the player concentrated), edge detection, and colour correction.

=== World design ===
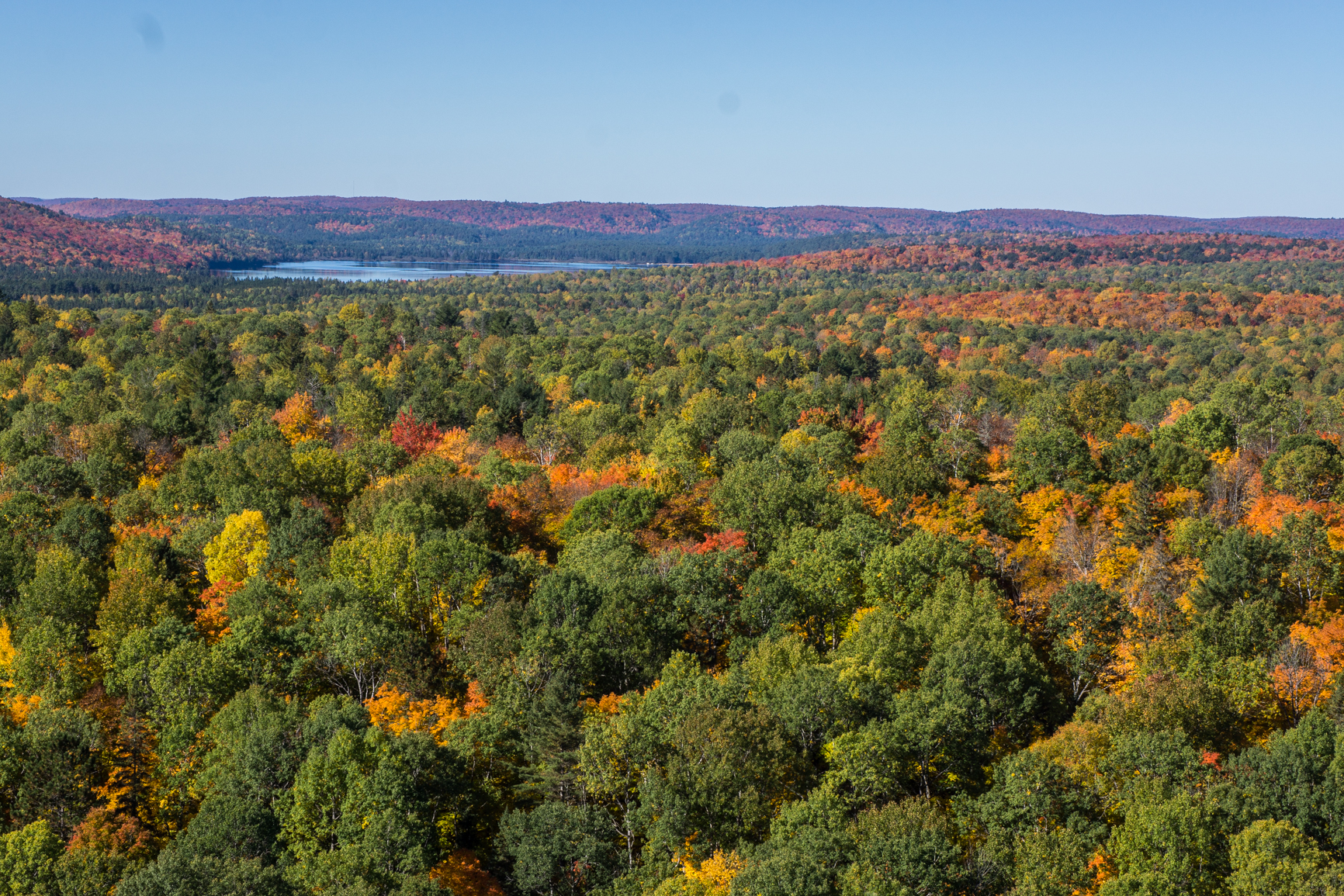
Algonquin Provincial Park inspired the design of the game's park.

Robinson-Yu used Unity's terrain editor to create the world. He attempted to recreate an open world, encouraging players to explore the world in whatever way they saw fit. This direction inspired him to create minigames that can be played after taking a break from hiking. Robinson-Yu wanted players to get lost while exploring the island. He added various landmarks to "pique people's curiosity", coins, paths, and signs. When working on A Short Hike, his main inspiration was The Legend of Zelda: Breath of the Wild (2017)—primarily due to its open world design—as well as the Animal Crossing series. He tried making places on the island as distinctive as possible. For example, the game's fire tower was inspired by his hiking trip to Mount Pilchuck, while the park itself was inspired by Algonquin Provincial Park.

In the starting area, there is a single dirt path that leads the player towards the town. During playtesting, Robinson-Yu noticed that some players ended up going in the ocean to nearby islands or to the back side of the mountain. To solve the problem, he created a cave at the back side of the mountain, which ultimately leads the player back to the town. He also used natural obstacles, such as high walls, to prevent the player from travelling up the mountain before they gain a certain number of Golden Feathers. In the early playtesting, Golden Feathers were harder to find, which changed during development. One of the first items Robinson-Yu added to the game was a shovel because he thought that the item would make the game include more secrets. He later added a bucket, which allows the player to water plants.

=== Music ===
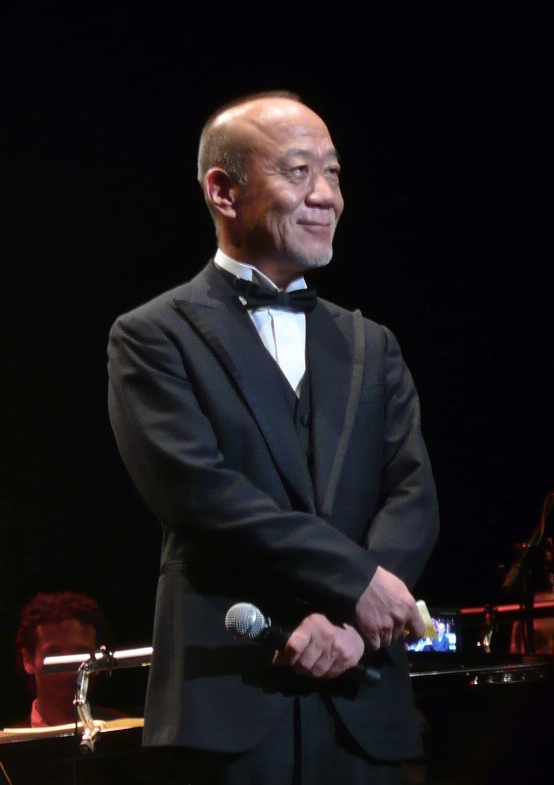
Mark Sparling was inspired by Joe Hisaishi (pictured) while composing the game.

The game's soundtrack was composed by Mark Sparling. Its soundtrack is adaptive, meaning that it changes based on world events and player actions. Sparling used a guitar, mandolin, and banjo to record live music, but sampled piano and drums. He was heavily inspired by the music of The Binding of Isaac (2011), composed by Danny Baranowsky, when starting his career. However, when composing A Short Hike, he was mainly inspired by the music of Studio Ghibli and Joe Hisaishi; Sparling tried imitating his style. The song "Somewhere in the Woods" combines inspirations from the musician Sufjan Stevens, particularly his album Carrie & Lowell (2015), and Animal Crossing: New Leaf (2012). Sparling said that "the cute, minimal percussion" was influenced by New Leaf while the guitar parts were influenced by Stevens. The main song, "Beach Buds", was inspired by the music of Studio Ghibli movies. New Leaf was used as an inspiration for other songs that use bass and percussion. Firewatch (2016) also inspired him while creating a "more ambient, moody sound". While the player flies, the song playing contains elements of Steve Reich's tracks.

A Short Hike has a bioregional sound design. Each region in A Short Hike has its combination of environmental sounds and musical elements. The adaptive layering system consists of musical layers that are gradually added or removed as Claire moves through different regions; shared elements provide continuity between areas, while region-specific melodies, harmonies, and rhythms distinguish locations such as the bay, campground, and western shoreline. The first layer is present in the starting area (bay), camps, and western shoreline, while the second layer, featured in the bay, has a "more memorable and active melody". The third layer is also featured in the bay, as well as in the camps, which feature a "slightly less active melody" (layer four). The shoreline has alternative chords (layer five). The mountain works differently (the layers are stacked on each other); Sparling said that the music, "hopefully, gets more exciting as you climb". Environmental sounds also provide information about Claire's surroundings, such as the flowing water, footsteps, echoes, wind, and weather. As Claire climbs toward Hawk Peak, the temperature drops and the landscape becomes covered in snow, during which the music becomes slower.

== Release ==
A Short Hike was a Humble Monthly exclusive in April 2019. After its release on Humble, Robinson-Yu worked on adding several features that he had not had time for, such as fishing, parkour races, and "beach-stick-ball". He used Twitter as a promotional platform. A Short Hike was released on Windows, Linux, and macOS on July 30, 2019, for the itch.io and Steam digital distribution services. With this release also came the "Extra Mile Update", which introduced new characters and world changes. In March 2020, the game was made free for a week on the Epic Games Store. The Nintendo Switch version was released on August 18, 2020. An update introducing a motorboat was included; it was also added to other platforms. The PlayStation 4 and Xbox One versions were released on November 16, 2021. In July 2023, the game was promoted in a Whimsy and Wonder bundle on Humble Bundle's website.

On April 1, 2022, Robinson-Yu released a multiplayer modification of the game, allowing up to 99 players to play on a world. He stated that it would not become an official game mode.

== Reception ==
Reception

Aggregate scores
Aggregator	Score
Metacritic	(PC) 82/100 (PS4) 83/100 (Switch) 88/100
OpenCritic	100% recommend

Review scores
Publication	Score
Adventure Gamers	4.5/5
Destructoid	7.5/10
Eurogamer	Essential
Famitsu	8/10, 9/10, 7/10, 9/10
GameSpot	9/10
IGN	8.8/10
Jeuxvideo.com	18/20
MeriStation	8/10
Nintendo Life	10/10
Nintendo World Report	9.5/10
Push Square	8/10
Shacknews	9/10

A Short Hike received "generally favorable" reviews from critics, according to the review aggregator website Metacritic. Fellow review aggregator OpenCritic assessed that the game received "mighty" approval, being recommended by 100% of critics. Four Famitsu critics gave it 33 out of 40, praising the movement and atmosphere.

Critics assessed the gameplay favourably. Willem Hilhorst of Nintendo World Report wrote that the game "delivers not just what the title promises", but exceeds the player's expectations. Cathlyn Vania of Adventure Gamers praised the fishing and climbing mechanics, as well as the option to find treasure, while Kevin Mersereau of Destructoid praised the flying mechanics. Stuart Gipp of Nintendo Life described the various in-game activities as "refreshingly organic", saying that the game "[makes] you feel like you're pushing at its limits". He also praised the game's overall design. Khee Hoo Chan of GameSpot particularly praised the in-game activity in which Claire gives a toy shovel to a frog, which Claire uses to create a sand castle. Hilhorst and Matthew Reynolds of Eurogamer described it as a "collect-a-thon", with Reynolds comparing it to the gameplay of Banjo-Kazooie. Journalists Lauren Morton of PC Gamer and Mykel Bright of Hardcore Gamer have described A Short Hike as a cozy game.

Additionally, critics praised the design of the world and its characters. Christian Donlan of Eurogamer enjoyed exploring various locations on the island, while Donovan Erskine of Shacknews praised the open world approach. Sergio González of MeriStation praised the exploration abilities. Chan said that the park is reminiscent of nature in real life, especially the hiking experiences. Erskine added that its characters are memorable, describing them as funny and the dialogue as authentic, while adding that the characters and stories "feel so distinct from one another". Chan commented that the interactions with Claire made him happy. Moore described the characters as "quirky and clever", while Mattia Pescitelli of Multiplayer.it commended the supporting characters, describing them as well-developed. The writing has also been praised, with reviewers commenting that the dialogue between Claire and NPCs is well-established, genuine, and emotional.

The game's art style and soundtrack have been commended by reviewers. Academics specialized in video games, Alex Mitchell and Jasper Van Vught, compared the game to Paratopic (2018), saying that its art style is "retro", but more colourful and inviting. Chan praised the appearance of the environment, while Vania praised the appearance of the water, environment, wind, and its animations. She described the park as having "vibrant colors and nature-inspired details". The game's presentation reminded Hilhorst of Nintendo DS games and the Animal Crossing series. Erskine praised the game's colours and lighting, describing the world as lively, and noted that the soundtrack is reminiscent of Animal Crossing. Donlan commended the appearance of the main island. On the other hand, Christopher Byrd of The Washington Post was not satisfied with the pixel art style, describing it as having watercolour looks. Gipp commended the game's controls, calling them "smoother than butter". Alexis Mariel Zema of Jeuxvideo.com and Lukas Schmid of PC Games disliked the camera controls, with the former saying that it cannot be rotated, while the latter criticized the lack of camera freedom.

Reviewers had mixed opinions on the short length of the game, with Mersereau saying that it is "a bit of a blessing and a curse". Mauro Ferrante of IGN Italy said that the game's short duration is its greatest strength. Erskine, however, only complained about the NPC quests and their locations, saying that the player could easily forget or mix quest orders up.

=== Awards ===
Eurogamer named A Short Hike one of the best video games "to play right now" in 2024. Eurogamer and Rock Paper Shotgun also named A Short Hike one of the best games of 2019, while Digital Spy, PC World, and GameSpot named it one of the best indie games of 2019. The Verge listed it as one of "the best short games of 2019", while PC Gamer listed it as one of the "hidden gems" of 2019. Robert Purchese of Eurogamer wrote "Will there be a better game this year? [...] Unlikely." In 2024, Rock Paper Shotgun listed it as one of the best open world video games for the PC.

Award	Date of ceremony	Category	Result	Ref.
2019 Golden Joystick Awards	November 15, 2019	Best Indie Game	Nominated	
23rd Annual D.I.C.E. Awards	February 13, 2020	Family Game of the Year	Nominated	
23rd Annual D.I.C.E. Awards	February 13, 2020	Outstanding Achievement for an Independent Game	Nominated	
23rd Annual D.I.C.E. Awards	February 13, 2020	Outstanding Achievement in Game Direction	Nominated	
Independent Games Festival Awards	March 18, 2020	Seumas McNally Grand Prize	Won	
Independent Games Festival Awards	March 18, 2020	Excellence in Design	Nominated	
Independent Games Festival Awards	March 18, 2020	Audience Award	Won	

== Analysis ==
Chris Tapsell of Eurogamer described A Short Hike as Zen, saying that it goes "beyond just being about nature to being about what it is to experience nature". For Nicole Carpenter of Polygon, the opening implied a critique of over-engagement with technology, as demonstrated in particular by the opening of the plot: while Claire is focused on using her cell phone, the gameplay and the island's design offer her numerous activities that distract her from her primary objective of climbing the mountain as quickly as possible. She also noted that technology is not a problem in itself.

Academics Jordi Montañana-Velilla and Alberto Porta-Pérez from the Jaume I University said that A Short Hike, Celeste (2018), and Haven Park (2021) have a mountain as their common gameplay element. Players in these games travel across the world and encounter campsites and blizzards. While they saw the gameplay in Celeste as demanding, A Short Hike and Haven Park were seen as rather cozy games. Mitchell and Van Vught said that A Short Hike combines the game's main mechanics, which are walking and flying, with object collection, exploration, and narrative. They wrote that the game does not have a time limit nor a losing condition, allowing the player to freely explore the environment and interact with NPCs. Academic Kate Galloway from the Rensselaer Polytechnic Institute noted that wind plays a key role while flying, while the sound design helps Claire navigate the world.

The game's narrative is connected with the open-ended gameplay, considering that Claire is waiting to receive a phone call from her mother, who is recovering from surgery. Mitchell and Van Vught have interpreted the lack of urgency in reaching the peak as an attempt to delay the possibility of receiving negative news. However, once Claire reaches the top, she experiences a moment of relief after hearing a positive call from her mother. Montañana-Velilla and Porta-Pérez also wrote that A Short Hike showcases Claire's growth toward independence and leaving her childhood behind. The two suggest that the avian portrayal of Claire can be interpreted as a metaphor of leaving the nest. However, they do not frame this as a direct intention of the developers.

Galloway said that the park's weak cell phone reception encourages visitors to enjoy the environment and "disconnect from ... everyday stresses". She noted that Galloway also said that A Short Hike connects "ecological relationships and natural environments", noting that the park's architecture reflects environments Robinson-Yu had hiked through. In Games and Narrative: Theory and Practice, academics Demi Schänzel, Leanne C. Taylor-Giles, and Jane Turner have said that games such as A Short Hike, Far From Noise (2017), and Depanneur Nocturne (2020) encourage players to reflect on their own experiences in these games.

== Sources ==
- Bostan, Barbaros, ed. (2021). Games and Narrative: Theory and Practice. Springer. ISBN 978-3-030-81538-7.
  - Schänzel, Demi; Taylor-Giles, Leanne C.; Turner, Jane. "Gamifying Kindness: Toward a Praxis of the Ephemeral". In Bostan (2021), pp. 61–76.
- Bycer, Joshua (2019). Game Design Deep Dive: Platformers (1st ed.). CRC Press. p. 6. ISBN 978-0-429-56057-6.
- Galloway, Kate (2023). "So You're Going on a "Short" Hike? Sensory Awareness and Listening to Ecoregions in A Short Hike". Music and the Moving Image. 16 (3): 24–42. doi:10.5406/19407610.16.3.03.
- Mitchell, Alex; Van Vught, Jasper (2025). Videogame Formalism: On Form, Aesthetic Experience, and Methodology. Taylor & Francis. ISBN 978-1-040-84381-9.
- Montañana-Velilla, Jordi; Porta-Pérez, Alberto (2024). "Escalar la montaña para sanar la herida. Afrontar la vulnerabilidad en el espacio videolúdico" [Climbing the mountain to heal the wound. Facing vulnerability in the videoludic space]. Área Abierta. Revista de Comunicación Audiovisual Y Publicitaria (in Spanish). 24 (3): 161–171. doi:10.5209/arab.96246.
- Robinson-Yu, Adam (March 27, 2020). Crafting A Tiny Open World: A Short Hike Postmortem (Video). Game Developers Conference. Archived from the original on December 30, 2025 – via YouTube.
- Scruffy (March 5, 2021). Musical Maps in A Short Hike (feat. Mark Sparling) (Video). Scruffy. Archived from the original on August 18, 2025 – via YouTube.
