= Concrete Genie =

2019 action-adventure game

- Developer: Pixelopus
- Publisher: Sony Interactive Entertainment
- Director: Dominic Robilliard
- Producer: Brent Gocke
- Designer: Jing Li
- Programmer: David Lee Swenson
- Artist: Jeff Sangalli
- Writer: Evan M. Skolnick
- Composer: Samual Marshall
- Engine: Unreal Engine 4
- Platform: PlayStation 4
- Release: October 8, 2019
- Genre: Action-adventure
- Mode: Single-player

Concrete Genie is an action-adventure video game developed by Pixelopus and published by Sony Interactive Entertainment for the PlayStation 4. The game was announced at Sony's PlayStation Media Showcase at Paris Games Week 2017 on October 30, 2017, and was released on October 8, 2019. It received generally favorable reviews from critics. The game is also the final game released by Pixelopus before their closure in June 2023.

== Gameplay ==
The player controls Ash and uses the DualShock 4's motion controls to create landscapes in the town of Denska. These landscapes turn into living portraits. How the player paints creatures and what color they paint them will affect the personalities of each creature. For example, red paint will grant a creature fire-breathing abilities. In addition to free-style drawing, there is a set of core puzzles in the game that the player has to solve through their artwork.

The player gains more access of Denska over time, but at the start of the game, the player only has access to a single neighborhood. Throughout the game, the bullies will move through the town and cause the artwork to die. They can also bully Ash, so the player must avoid the bullies as Ash traverses the town. The player can also fix the ruined artwork.

Later sections of the game have the player fight against Dark Genies with elemental splash-based attacks to defeat them. The player can only use Fire, Thunder and Wind, however they also may use nearby friends to search and stun the Dark Genies. Only thr Dark Element Genies can be pacified. At the end of the game, the player must battle and defeat the last Dark Genie.

Project manager Brent Gocke says the game is between five and six hours long. The developer is currently looking into a multi-player component to the game.

== Plot ==
Concrete Genie takes place in a small port town named Denska. Once thriving, it has been abandoned after an oil spill caused by a tanker, along with it being slowly taken over by a force simply called Darkness, which stems from negative emotions. The story focuses on Ash, a young teenager who spends his time drawing in his sketchbook. He is frequently targeted by a group of bullies: Zack, Beatrice, Froggie, and siblings Chuck and Janie.

One day, the bullies discover Ash's sketchbook and rip out the pages, scattering them across the town. The bullies then force Ash into a cable car that takes him to Denska's lighthouse island. Upon arriving, Ash sees one of the pages and chases it into the lighthouse. The drawing on the page, a creature called Luna, comes to life and guides Ash to a magic paint brush, which gives life to anything he paints. The brush also allows Ash to create Genies: friendly creatures based on chalk drawings that he made as a child. Luna requests that Ash remove the Darkness from Denska, to which he accepts.

Ash returns to Denska and starts bringing life back to the town and eliminating the Darkness, finding more pages and creating more Genies on the way. He sometimes crosses paths with the bullies, but when they try to take the brush, Ash experiences a vision of their past, revealing that they all had troubled childhoods: Zack ran away from home to escape his arguing and dysfunctional parents, Chuck and Janie's parents became separated, Beatrice's father was incarcerated, and Froggie is implied to hang out with them only to avoid being bullied himself. Ash begins to feel sorry for the bullies.

Ash continues with his journey, but just as he is finishing his last painting, he is interrupted by the bullies, who break the brush and ruin the painting. Ash's despair and the bullies' negativity manifest as Darkness, which corrupts the Genies, turning them into vicious monsters that attack the bullies and further spread the Darkness in Denska. Luna teleports Ash back to the lighthouse for safety, and seemingly sacrifices herself to repair and empower the brush, allowing Ash to fight the Dark Genies. He returns to the town, restoring the Genies to their original form and rescuing the bullies, all of whom apologize and assist him. The group chases the last Dark Genie into the lighthouse island, and upon its defeat, Luna is revealed to still be alive. Ash makes one final painting that completely eradicates the Darkness from Denska.

During the credits, Ash is shown to have become friends with the others, who each receive their own magic brush from Luna, and people begin returning to Denska.

== Development ==
Pixelopus served as the game's lead developer. Creative director Dominic Robillard says the game is heavily inspired by Sega's Jet Set Radio, while the concept of painting street arts came from one of the team members, Ashwin Kumar, who grew up in India. The game would not rate any players' creations because the team did not want to judge players' creation. The game features a story mode that deals with themes like bullying. The game was later delayed to late 2019, though Pixelopus confirmed that the game would be released with a mode for the PlayStation VR headset.

== Reception ==
Reception

Aggregate scores
Aggregator	Score
Metacritic	75/100
OpenCritic	69 %

Review scores
Publication	Score
Computer Games Magazine	7.5/10
Destructoid	8/10
Edge	6/10
Electronic Gaming Monthly	2/5
GamePro	77/100
GameSpot	7/10
GamesRadar+	4.5/5
IGN	8/10
Jeuxvideo.com	14/20
PlayStation Official Magazine – UK	8/10
USgamer	3/5

Concrete Genie was positively received upon release; the game holds a score of 75/100 on review aggregator Metacritic based on 83 critics, indicating "generally favorable" reviews. Praise was directed towards its visual style, atmosphere, thematic elements and art-based gameplay, while criticism was pointed at the game's easy difficulty level and combat.

=== Awards ===
Year	Award	Category	Result	Ref
2019	Gamescom	Best Action/Adventure Game	Nominated	
2019	Gamescom	Best Family Game	Won	
2019	Gamescom	Best Sony PlayStation 4 Game	Nominated	
2019	2019 Golden Joystick Awards	PlayStation Game of the Year	Nominated	
2019	The Game Awards 2019	Games for Impact	Nominated	
2020	New York Game Awards	Central Park Children's Zoo Award for Best Kids Game	Nominated	
2020	23rd Annual D.I.C.E. Awards	Outstanding Achievement in Art Direction	Nominated	
2020	23rd Annual D.I.C.E. Awards	Outstanding Technical Achievement	Nominated	
2020	NAVGTR Awards	Control Design, VR	Nominated	
2020	NAVGTR Awards	Direction in Virtual Reality	Nominated	
2020	NAVGTR Awards	Original Light Mix Score, New IP	Nominated	
2020	NAVGTR Awards	Sound Mixing in Virtual Reality	Nominated	
2020	SXSW Gaming Awards	Excellence in Technical Achievement	Nominated	
2020	16th British Academy Games Awards	Artistic Achievement	Nominated	
2020	16th British Academy Games Awards	Family	Nominated	
2020	18th Annual G.A.N.G. Awards	Best Cinematic Cutscene Audio	Nominated	
2020	18th Annual G.A.N.G. Awards	Best Interactive Score	Nominated	
2020	18th Annual G.A.N.G. Awards	Best Audio Mix	Nominated	

== Notes ==
Known in Japan as Ash to Mahou no Fude (アッシュと魔法の筆, lit. Ash and the Magic Brush)
