= Pistol Whip =

2019 video game

- Developer: Cloudhead Games
- Engine: Unity
- Platforms: Oculus Quest, Microsoft Windows, PlayStation 4
- Release: November 7, 2019
- Genres: First-person shooter, Rhythm game
- Mode: Single-player

Pistol Whip is a 2019 virtual reality video game developed and published by Cloudhead Games. The game is a stage based shooter where the player automatically moves through the level and has to defeat enemies to the music. The game was released for Oculus Quest and Microsoft Windows on November 7, 2019. A PlayStation 4 port released in July 2020. Since February 2023, it is also supported on the PlayStation 5.

== Gameplay ==
The hub for Pistol Whip features movie posters which each correspond to a song, selecting one allows the player to set modifiers like dual-wielding and limit the amount of bullets a magazine has. Each modifier has a different impact on the score, with more difficult challengers adding a multiplier to the score, while easier ones lower it. Different difficulty modes are also available, with separate leaderboards for each difficulty level.

During a stage, the player character moves forward automatically, similar to endless runner games. Enemies will appear and shoot at the player, if the player doesn't dodge the bullet they lose health, which can be regained by pistol whipping. The player can shoot them to increase their score. If the player runs out of ammo they need to aim their gun directly down or pistol whip an enemy to reload. During a level obstacles might appear, requiring the player to move out of the way or take damage.

== Development ==
Pistol Whip started development in 2018, after low profits from Cloudhead's previous games. Speaking on what they wanted from the game, Cloudhead's CEO stated, "We had a really short [financial] runway at that time and we had to look at what was working on market. We knew it had to be accessible. It had to be really easy to share and compete with friends. You had to look good while playing it—we thought about how influencers would look while playing it. It had to have high replayability, it needed to be a games-as-a-service model, and, really importantly, it had to be targeted toward the Quest.” The studio planned to stop making VR games if the Oculus Quest and Valve Index didn't sell enough to justify developing games for a niche market. The majority of the game's success came from the Oculus Quest and its successor.

== Reception ==
Reception

Aggregate score
Aggregator	Score
Metacritic	PS4: 88/100; PC: 83/100

Review scores
Publication	Score
Edge	8/10
IGN	8/10
Jeuxvideo.com	16/20
PlayStation Official Magazine – UK	8/10
UploadVR	5/5
Road to VR	8/10

Pistol Whip received "generally favorable" reviews according to Metacritic.

Ars Technica praised the auto aim system, writing that it "does just enough legwork to let players focus on speed without completely dumbing the game down". Polygon liked the game's action, particularly how it synced up with the music, calling it "amazing" and "stylish". Kyle Hilliard of IGN enjoyed the clear visual design, feeling that it communicated the bullets coming at the player, "Not only are they well-highlighted, but on-screen prompts let you know when they're coming from out of your field of view".

At the 23rd Annual D.I.C.E. Awards, the Academy of Interactive Arts & Sciences awarded Pistol Whip with Immersive Reality Game of the Year, as well as a nomination for Immersive Reality Technical Achievement.
