= Ninja Reflex =

2008 video game

- Developer: Sanzaru Games
- Publishers: Nunchuck Games; Electronic Arts
- Platforms: Microsoft Windows, Nintendo DS, Wii
- Release: Wii, DS: NA: March 4, 2008; EU: March 14, 2008; AU: May 1, 2008; Windows; March 21, 2008
- Genre: Party
- Modes: Multiplayer, Single player

Ninja Reflex is a video game developed by Sanzaru Games, and co-published by Nunchuck Games and Electronic Arts. It was released for Wii and Nintendo DS in 2008. It was also released for the Steam service on March 21, 2008.

Ninja Reflex is a party game, capitalizing on the popularity of games that take advantage of the unique Nintendo Wii Remote motions seen in other titles including WarioWare: Smooth Moves, Mario Party 8, and Wii Sports. The objective of Ninja Reflex is to test players' reflexes and reaction times and challenge friends in head-to-head competition.

== Reception ==
Reception

Aggregate score
Aggregator	Score		
Aggregator	DS	PC	Wii
Metacritic	54/100	57/100	49/100

Review scores
Publication	Score		
Publication	DS	PC	Wii
1Up.com	C+	N/A	C+
Eurogamer	5/10	N/A	4/10
Famitsu	N/A	N/A	22/40
Game Informer	N/A	N/A	5/10
GameRevolution	N/A	N/A	D−
GameSpy	N/A	N/A	2/5
GameZone	6/10	N/A	6.7/10
IGN	6/10	6/10	6/10
Nintendo Life	5/10	N/A	6/10
Official Nintendo Magazine	N/A	N/A	40%
PC Gamer (UK)	N/A	42%	N/A
Pocket Gamer	3/5	N/A	N/A
X-Play	N/A	N/A	2/5
411Mania	N/A	N/A	4/10

The DS and PC versions received "mixed" reviews, while the Wii version received "generally unfavorable reviews", according to the review aggregation website Metacritic. Common criticisms include the short game play for the $40 price point (Wii version). In Japan, where the Wii version was ported for release on March 27, 2008, Famitsu gave it a score of 22 out of 40.

X-Play gave praise to the graphics and the Wii version's animation, although giving criticism for the game having only six mini games, and found the game to be frustrating due to the game having difficulty reading the movements of the Wii Remote. GamePro called the DS version "a fun rental. But if you decide to shell out full price for a collection of repetitive mini-games, you need a lesson in spending, my son." (Note: GamePro gave the DS version 3.5/5 for graphics, and three 3/5 scores for sound, control, and fun factor.)
