= Haven Park =

2021 video game

- Steam digital art
- Developer: Bubblebird Studio
- Publisher: Mooneye
- Engine: Unity
- Platforms: Windows, macOS, Linux, Switch
- Release: 5 August 2021
- Genre: Adventure
- Mode: Single-player

Haven Park is an adventure game developed by Bubblebird Studio and published by Mooneye Studios in 2021 for Windows, macOS, Linux, and Nintendo Switch. Players maintain and explore a nature park by collecting items and building structures to attract visitors. The game was the first released by Swiss developer Fabien Weibel, and the first game released under the publisher's Mooneye Indies series to support smaller developers. Upon release, Haven Park received average reviews, with critics praising the presentation and tone of the game and its encouragement of player exploration, whilst critiquing the gameplay mechanics and puzzle design.

== Gameplay ==
Gameplay screenshot

The player plays as Flint, a small bird who has been tasked by their grandmother to operate campsites across the island of Haven Park. To maintain the park, the player completes various tasks monitored by a Notebook, including repairing broken objects and locating items or completing errands for the park's inhabitants. To complete these tasks, players explore the island to collect resources. The player accumulates experience points when completing quests and collecting supplies, and is able to use the points to level up, which unlocks new skills, allowing them to find, carry and sell more resources. In every campsite is a workshop, where the player can use collected resources to construct items and buildings that provide decorations and amenities, such as tents, firepits, and barbecues. Once the player creates a camp fire, more campers will appear and request certain amenities in the campsite. Certain skills unlock the ability to construct certain amenities, including a marketplace, which enables the player to buy and sell certain resources.

== Development ==
Haven Park was created by Luxembourg-based independent developer Fabien Weibel. The game was the first game released by Weibel, who entered game development following an education and career in art and animation in Lyon. Weibel was inspired by the games A Short Hike and Animal Crossing, aiming to similarly create a slow-paced, "small exploration game". He pursued a low poly art direction to "keep things simple" and set a realistic standard for the game as a solo developer, creating the assets in Blender and exporting them to Unity. Prior to the game's planned release date, Weibel was contacted by Mooneye Studios to secure a partnership to publish the game, who released the game as the first of a series titled Mooneye Indies, intended to assist "small, independent teams" to publish a "narrative or wholesome game".

== Reception ==
Reception

Aggregate score
Aggregator	Score
Metacritic	68%

Review scores
Publication	Score
Destructoid	5.5/10
Gamezebo	70%
Nintendo Life	7.7/10
Gaming Age	B+

Haven Park received "mixed or average" reviews, according to review aggregator website Metacritic, with many critics assessing the game's merits in comparison to the 2019 independent game A Short Hike and the Animal Crossing series. Many reviewers praised the game's setting and visual presentation. PC Gamer found the game to be "completely gorgeous" due to the variety in its environments, and its tone as "sweet and wholesome". Gamezebo described the game's presentation as "charming" and highlighted its world as "full of life" and featuring "lush landscapes".

Critics praised the game's breath of content and exploration. Describing the environment as a "joy to explore", PC Gamer wrote that the gameplay had a "great balance of resource-based tasks and fun distractions" and "surprising stuff to find". Similarly describing the game as "chock full of points of interest", Nintendo Life commended the game for its branching paths and content to discover. Destructoid found the process of discovery to be the "most enjoyable" part of the game, noting the "points of interest that make exploring worthwhile". Rock Paper Shotgun described the game's encouragement of exploration created a "sense of delight and discovery".

However, reviewers were mixed on the game's mechanics. Nintendo Life found the movement to be "in need of a bit of a tweak" due to the "sticky" collision with objects. Destructoid critiqued the experience system as "unnecessary", observing that the awarded points were too low and disproportionately allocated to tasks, and found the crafting system to be "underwhelming", due to the limited number of craftable items. Gaming Age noted the game's map omitted large areas that "(made) it very easy to get lost" and caused "aimless wandering". Critics were also mixed on the game's puzzles. Nintendo Life described the puzzles as at times "laughably simple" and other times "uncharacteristically obtuse", citing "unclear" directions. Gaming Age found the puzzles were "not particularly difficult" and "don't always necessarily impact the story in a meaningful way", although noted they provided the player with a "reason to explore the island".
