= Mystery Case Files: The Malgrave Incident =

2011 video game

- North American cover art
- Developers: Big Fish Games; Sanzaru Games
- Publisher: Nintendo
- Producers: Shawn Seavers; Shinya Takahashi; Kensuke Tanabe
- Designers: Adrian Woods; Shawn Wood; Tin Guerrero; Todd Pound
- Composers: Austin Caughlin; Chris Kennedy; Wall Matthews
- Series: Mystery Case Files
- Platform: Wii
- Release: NA: June 27, 2011; EU: September 9, 2011; AU: September 22, 2011
- Genres: Adventure, puzzle
- Modes: Single-player, multiplayer

Mystery Case Files: The Malgrave Incident is a puzzle adventure video game developed by Big Fish Games and Sanzaru Games and published by Nintendo for the Wii video game console. It was released in North America in June 2011, and in Europe and Australia in September.

== Development ==
The game was announced in April 2011 as Mystery Case Files: Dust to Dust, but due to some issues, Big Fish Games changed the title into The Malgrave Incident together with the release of two new screenshots. After Nintendo released a teaser video of the game and opened a website on Nintendo's website, Mystery Case Files: The Malgrave Incident became a part of the E3 2011 where the game was demonstrated in front of the public and the official trailer of the game was shown.

== Reception ==
The game received "mixed or average" reviews, according to video game review aggregator Metacritic.

Colin Moriarty of IGN wrote that the game was only for a small niche of casual gamers and would not be satisfying to most players. He described its craftsmanship as "insanely low-resolution graphics" and had similar criticism for its soundtrack. Moriarty wrote that the adventure genre was dead and only those who specifically sought out the type of game would appreciate it.
