= Asgard's Wrath 2 =

- Developer: Sanzaru Games
- Publisher: Oculus Studios
- Engine: Unreal Engine 4
- Platforms: Meta Quest 2; Meta Quest Pro; Meta Quest 3
- Release: WW: December 15, 2023
- Genre: Action role-playing
- Mode: Single-player

Asgard's Wrath 2 is an action role-playing game developed by Sanzaru Games and published by Oculus Studios for the Meta Quest series of virtual reality headsets. It is the sequel to Asgard's Wrath (2019). The game was released worldwide in December 2023 and was included for free as a launch game for the Meta Quest 3.

== Gameplay ==
Players control a Norse god who possesses mortals who have important destinies. After being betrayed by Loki in Asgard's Wrath, the protagonist is freed from bondage and sent to Egypt. There, players interact with gods from Egyptian mythology and seek a way to get revenge on Loki. Players can explore the open world; possess four characters, each of whom has their own story and skill tree; talk to non-player characters; play minigames; solve puzzles; and engage in combat with enemies and bosses. Players are assisted in combat by followers, who also have their own stories.

== Development ==
California-based studio Sanzaru Games began development on Asgard's Wrath 2 shortly after Asgard's Wrath's release in late 2019. As a result of Meta's commitment to its standalone devices and its discontinuation of the non-standalone Oculus Rift family of headsets, the sequel shifted platforms, no longer requiring a headset connected to a Microsoft Windows computer and instead becoming exclusive to standalone Meta headsets.

Following the original's success, developer Sanzaru Games was acquired by Meta's Oculus Studios in 2020. Asgard's Wrath 2 was announced alongside the Meta Quest 3 during the Meta Quest Gaming Showcase on June 1, 2023, as a launch game for the new headset.

Oculus Studios released Asgard's Wrath 2 for the Meta Quest 2, Meta Quest Pro, and Meta Quest 3 on December 15, 2023, to be bundled with all Meta Quest 3 purchases until January 27, 2024.

Asgard's Wrath 2 would be Sanzaru Games' last project before its closure by Meta on January 13, 2026.

== Reception ==
Reception

Aggregate scores
Aggregator	Score
Metacritic	87/100
OpenCritic	93% recommended

Review score
Publication	Score
IGN	10/10

Asgard's Wrath 2 received "universal acclaim" on Metacritic. IGN gave it a perfect score and made it their editors' choice, writing that it "sets a new gold standard for VR" and competes with the best role-playing games on any platform. UploadVR said it "offers Quest players more than ever, on an uncharted scale". In their review, they praised what they felt was epic gameplay but said the game was let down by not being substantially different from non VR AAA role playing games. NPR's reviewer said Asgard's Wrath 2 had become his new favorite VR game and wrote that "the gameplay, pacing, and story are a gift from the gods". Siliconera called it "a genuinely cool, well-crafted endeavor" and said the only drawback was that the graphics were limited by the Meta Quest 3 compared to non-VR platforms.

=== Awards and accolades ===
Year	Ceremony	Category	Result	Ref.
2024	13th New York Game Awards	Coney Island Dreamland Award for Best AR/VR Game	Won	
2024	27th Annual D.I.C.E. Awards	Immersive Reality Game of the Year	Won	
2024	27th Annual D.I.C.E. Awards	Immersive Reality Technical Achievement	Nominated	
2024	Golden Joystick Awards 2024	Best Performer (Sonequa Martin-Green as Alvilda)	Nominated	
2024	The Game Awards 2024	Best VR / AR Game	Nominated	
2025	52nd Annie Awards	Outstanding Achievement for Character Animation in a Video Game	Nominated	
2025	Game Audio Network Guild Awards	Best Cinematic & Cutscene Audio	Nominated	
