= D.I.C.E. Awards =

Annual video game award show

- Current: 29th Annual D.I.C.E. Awards
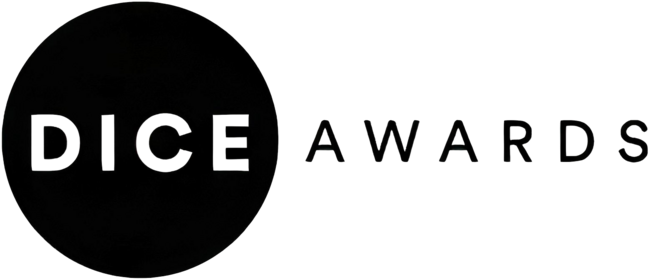
- Awarded for: Video game industry achievements
- Venue: Aria Convention Center (Las Vegas, Nevada)
- Country: United States
- Hosted by: Academy of Interactive Arts & Sciences
- Formerly called: Interactive Achievement Awards (1998–2013)
- First award: May 28, 1998; 28 years ago
- Final award: February 12, 2026; 9 months ago
- Website: interactive.org

The D.I.C.E. Awards (formerly the Interactive Achievement Awards) is an annual awards show in the video game industry, and commonly referred to as the video game equivalent of the Academy Awards. The awards are arranged by the Academy of Interactive Arts & Sciences (AIAS) and held during the AIAS' annual D.I.C.E. Summit in Las Vegas. "D.I.C.E." is a backronym for "Design Innovate Communicate Entertain". The D.I.C.E. Awards recognizes games, individuals, and development teams that have contributed to the advancement of the multi-billion dollar worldwide entertainment software industry.

== Format ==
The Academy encourages submissions from any individual or company providing that submission eligibility requirements are met. Each application enters the submitted game or title for consideration in at least one Craft category and only one Genre category. For most categories, the title must be publicly released in North America within the past calendar year. The exceptions to this rule are submissions for "Online Game of the Year" and "Fighting Game of the Year".

The finalists in each category are selected by a peer panel, assembled by AIAS, of over 100 video game professionals across several facets of the industry, including developers, programmers, artists, and publishers, which is published on the AIAS website each year. The nominees are then voted on by the full membership of AIAS (over 33,000 members) via a confidential and secured voting system, and winners are subsequently announced during the D.I.C.E. Summit in Las Vegas, typically in February of that year.

Academy active Creative/Technical, Business, and Affiliate members are qualified to vote in all genre categories along with "Game of the Year", "Mobile Game of the Year", "Online Game of the Year", and "Outstanding Achievement for an Independent Game". Creative/Technical members of the Academy may also vote on craft categories related to their expertise:

- Game designers and producers vote for the categories of "Story", "Character", "Audio Design", "Game Direction", and "Game Design".
- Artists, animators, and programmers vote for the categories of "Animation", "Art Direction", "Character", and "Technical".
- Audio designers and musicians vote for the categories of "Audio Design", "Original Music Composition", and "Character".

Due to this approach, the D.I.C.E. Awards are considered the main peer-based recognition within the video games industry compared to other major awards.

== Award ceremonies ==
#	Date	Game of the Year	Host(s)	Venue	Ref.
1st	May 28, 1998	GoldenEye 007	—N/a	Georgia World Congress Center	
2nd	May 13, 1999	The Legend of Zelda: Ocarina of Time	—N/a	Variety Arts Theater	
3rd	May 11, 2000	The Sims	Martin Short	Millennium Biltmore Hotel	
4th	March 22, 2001	Diablo II	Martin Lewis	Polly Esther's	
5th	February 28, 2002	Halo: Combat Evolved	Patton Oswalt	Hard Rock Hotel and Casino	
6th	February 27, 2003	Battlefield 1942	Dave Foley	Hard Rock Hotel and Casino	
7th	March 4, 2004	Call of Duty	Diane Mizota	Palms Casino Resort	
8th	February 1, 2005	Half-Life 2	Kurt Scholler, Cory Rouse	Green Valley Ranch	
9th	February 9, 2006	God of War	Jay Mohr	Hard Rock Hotel and Casino	
10th	February 7, 2007	Gears of War	Jay Mohr	Hard Rock Hotel and Casino	
11th	February 8, 2008	Call of Duty 4: Modern Warfare	Jay Mohr	Red Rock Casino, Resort & Spa	
12th	February 19, 2009	LittleBigPlanet	Jay Mohr	Red Rock Casino, Resort & Spa	
13th	February 18, 2010	Uncharted 2: Among Thieves	Jay Mohr	Red Rock Casino, Resort & Spa	
14th	February 11, 2011	Mass Effect 2	Jay Mohr	Red Rock Casino, Resort & Spa	
15th	February 9, 2012	The Elder Scrolls V: Skyrim	Jay Mohr	Red Rock Casino, Resort & Spa	
16th	February 7, 2013	Journey	Chris Hardwick	Red Rock Casino, Resort & Spa	
17th	February 6, 2014	The Last of Us	Felicia Day, Freddie Wong	Hard Rock Hotel and Casino	
18th	February 5, 2015	Dragon Age: Inquisition	Pete Holmes	Hard Rock Hotel and Casino	
19th	February 18, 2016	Fallout 4	Pete Holmes	Mandalay Bay Convention Center	
20th	February 23, 2017	Overwatch	Greg Miller, Jessica Chobot	Mandalay Bay Convention Center	
21st	February 22, 2018	The Legend of Zelda: Breath of the Wild	Greg Miller, Jessica Chobot	Mandalay Bay Convention Center	
22nd	February 13, 2019	God of War	Greg Miller, Jessica Chobot	Aria Resort and Casino	
23rd	February 13, 2020	Untitled Goose Game	Greg Miller, Jessica Chobot	Aria Resort and Casino	
24th	April 22, 2021	Hades	Greg Miller, Jessica Chobot, Kahlief Adams	none (Note: Held virtually due to the COVID-19 pandemic)	
25th	February 24, 2022	It Takes Two	Greg Miller, Jessica Chobot	Mandalay Bay Convention Center	
26th	February 23, 2023	Elden Ring	Stella Chung, Greg Miller	Resorts World Las Vegas	
27th	February 15, 2024	Baldur's Gate 3	Stella Chung, Greg Miller	Aria Resort and Casino	
28th	February 13, 2025	Astro Bot	Stella Chung, Greg Miller	Aria Resort and Casino	
29th	February 12, 2026	Clair Obscur: Expedition 33	Stella Chung, Greg Miller	Aria Resort and Casino	

== Award categories ==
=== Game of the Year Awards ===
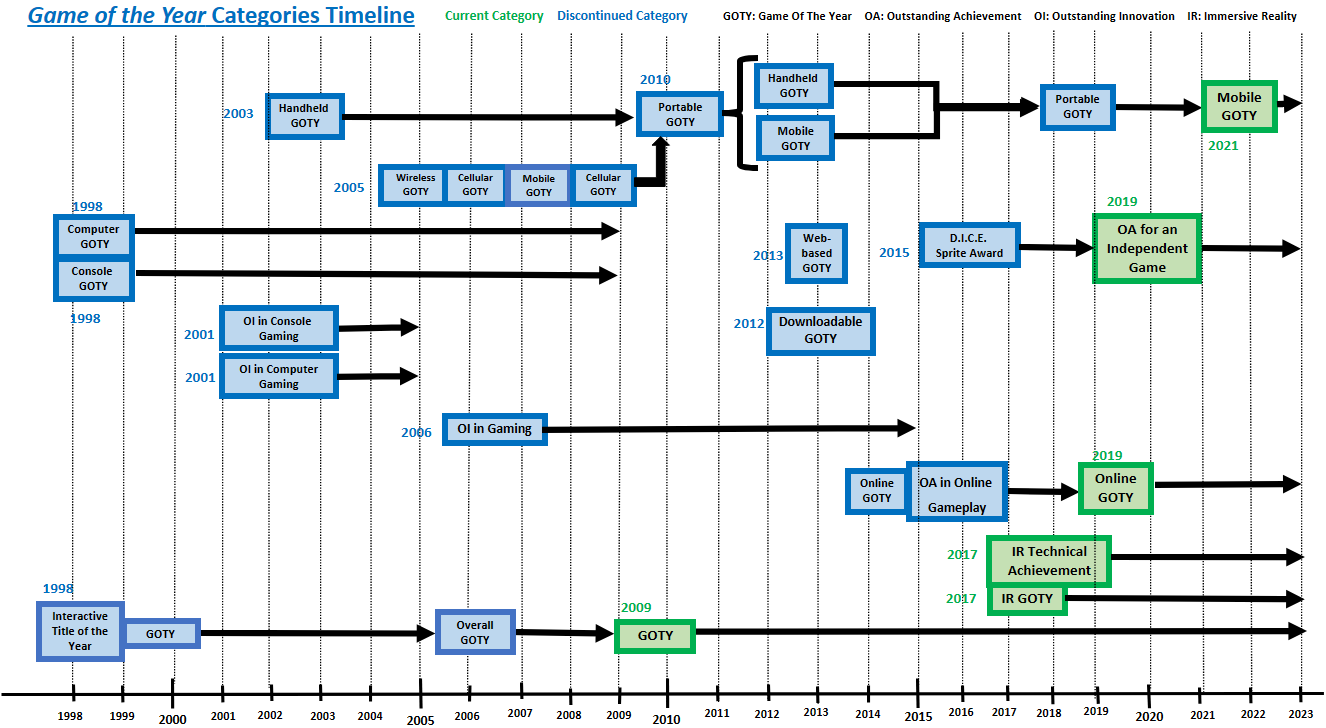
Timeline of Game of the Year awards categories. The most characteristic one -- Game of the Year or GOTY award -- only changed its name a few times since 1998. In blue, discontinued, renamed or merged categories. In green, current ones (2023). First year of publication of awards indicated.

- Game of the Year
- Online Game of the Year
- Mobile Game of the Year
- Outstanding Achievement for an Independent Game
- Immersive Reality Game of the Year
- Immersive Reality Technical Achievement

=== Craft Awards ===
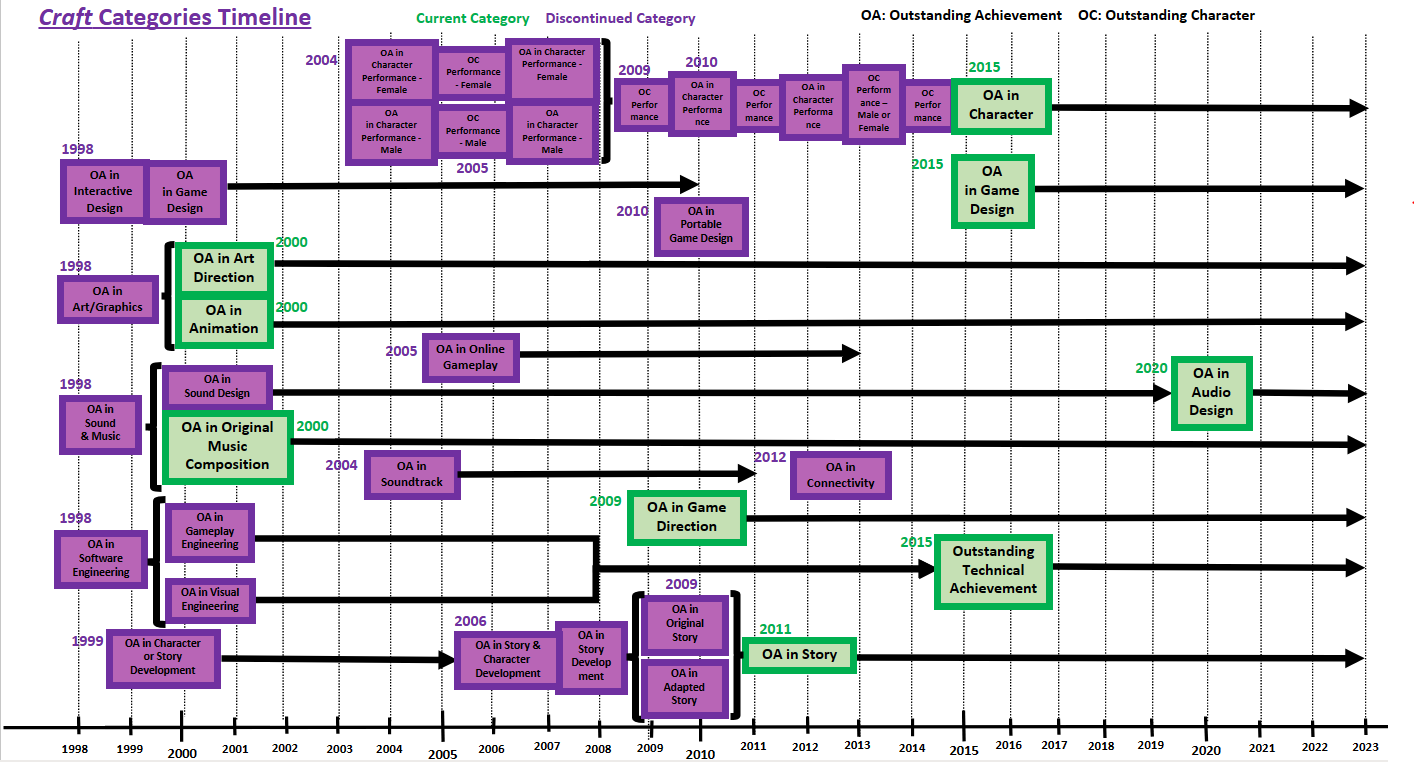
Timeline of Craft awards categories. In purple, discontinued, renamed or merged categories. In green, current ones (2023). First year of publication of awards indicated.

- Outstanding Achievement in Game Direction
- Outstanding Achievement in Game Design
- Outstanding Achievement in Animation
- Outstanding Achievement in Art Direction
- Outstanding Achievement in Character
- Outstanding Achievement in Original Music Composition
- Outstanding Achievement in Audio Design
- Outstanding Achievement in Story
- Outstanding Technical Achievement

=== Genre Awards ===
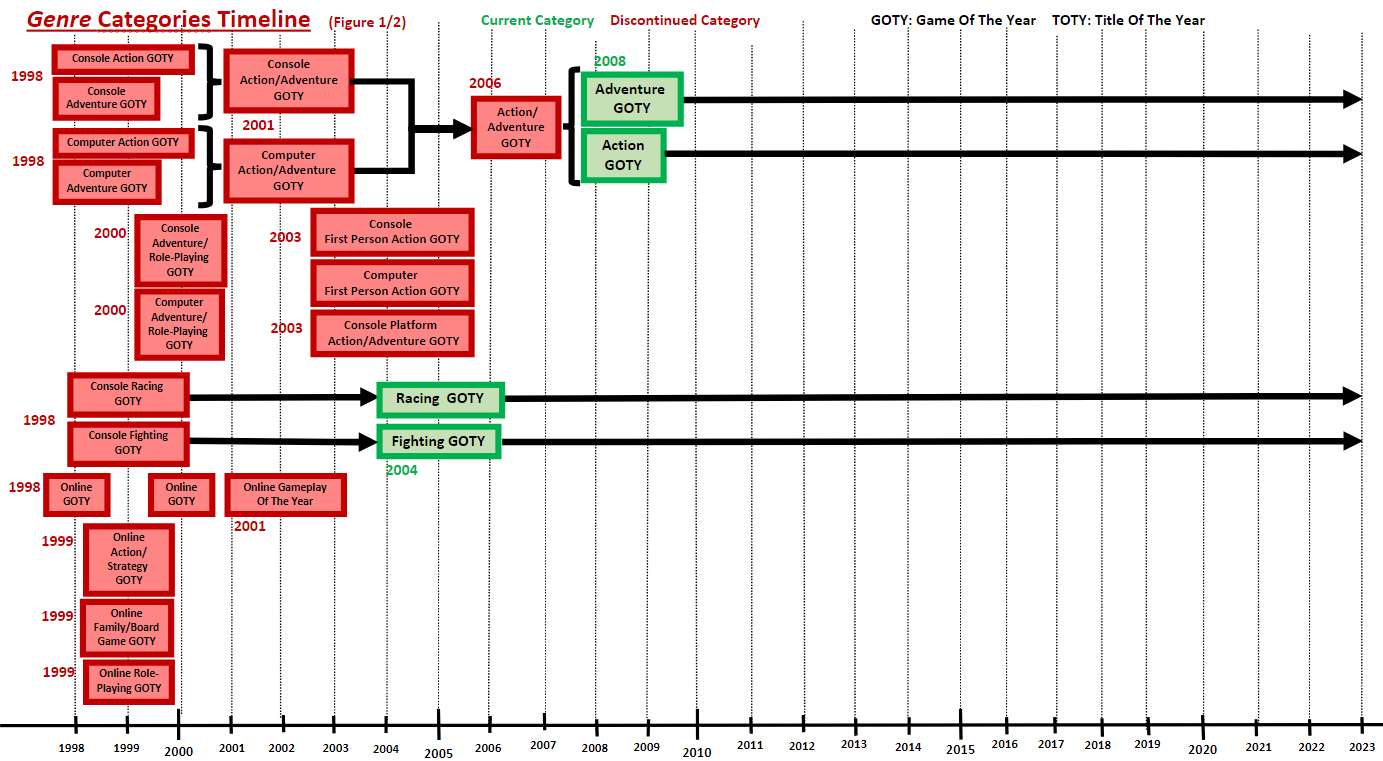

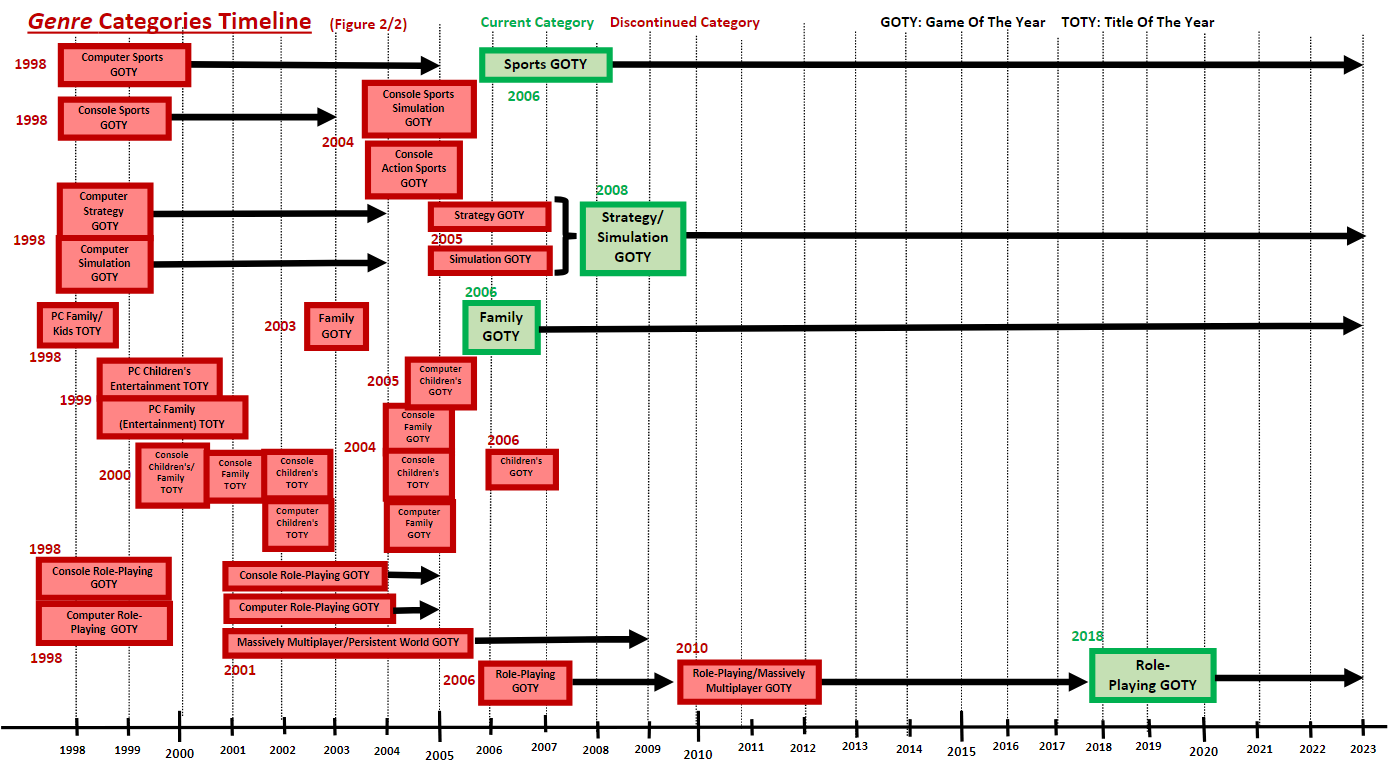
Timeline of Genre awards categories. In red, discontinued, renamed or merged categories. In green, current ones (2023). First year of publication of awards indicated.

- Action Game of the Year
- Adventure Game of the Year
- Family Game of the Year
- Fighting Game of the Year
- Racing Game of the Year
- Role-Playing Game of the Year
- Sports Game of the Year
- Strategy/Simulation Game of the Year

=== Discontinued, renamed, or merged categories ===
==== Game of the Year ====
- Console Game of the Year: 1998-2009
- Computer Game of the Year 1998-2009
- Innovation in Console Gaming 2001-2005
- Innovation in Computer Gaming 2001-2005
- Outstanding Innovation in Gaming: 2006-2015
- Handheld Game of the Year: 2007-2009, 2012-2018
- Portable Game of the Year: 2010-2011, 2019-2020
- Downloadable Game of the Year: 2012-2014
- Web Based Game of the Year: 2013

==== Craft Awards ====
- Outstanding Achievement in Art/Graphics: 1998-1999
- Outstanding Achievement in Sound and Music: 1998-1999
- Outstanding Achievement in Software Engineering: 1998-1999
- Outstanding Achievement in Gameplay Engineering: 2000–2014
- Outstanding Achievement in Visual Engineering: 2000–2014
- Outstanding (Achievement in) Character Performance - Female: 2004–2007
- Outstanding (Achievement in) Character Performance - Male: 2004–2007
- Outstanding Achievement in Soundtrack: 2004–2011
- Outstanding Achievement in Online Gameplay: 2005–2013
- Outstanding Achievement in Original Story: 2009–2010
- Outstanding Achievement in Adapted Story: 2009–2010
- Outstanding Achievement in Portable Game Design: 2010
- Outstanding Achievement in Connectivity: 2012-2013

==== Genre Awards ====
- Action/Adventure Game of the Year: 2006–2007
- Casual Game of the Year: 2009–2014
- Cellular/Mobile Game of the Year: 2006-2009
- Children's Game of the Year: 2006–2007
- Downloadable Game of the Year: 2004–2008
- First-Person Action Game of the Year: 2006–2007
- Handheld Game of the Year: 2001-2006
- Massively Multiplayer/Persistent World Game of the Year: 2000–2009
- Social Networking Game of the Year: 2010–2012
- Strategy Game of the Year: 1998–2007
- Simulation Game of the Year: 1998–2007
- Wireless Game of the Year: 2005

==== Console ====
- Console Action Game of the Year: 1998–2000
- Console Action/Adventure Game of the Year: 2001–2005
- Console Adventure Game of the Year: 1998–1999
- Console Adventure/Role-Playing Game of the Year: 2000
- Console Children's/Family Title of the Year: 2000
- Console Children's Title of the Year: 2002, 2004-2005
- Console Family Title/Game of the Year: 2001, 2004-2005
- Console First-Person Action Game of the Year: 2003–2005
- Console Platform Action/Adventure Game of the Year: 2003-2005
- Console Role-Playing Game of the Year: 1998–1999, 2001–2005
- Console Sports Game of the Year: 1998–2003
- Console Action Sports Game of the Year: 2004-2005
- Console Sports Simulation Game of the Year: 2004–2005

==== Computer ====
- Computer Action Game of the Year: 1998–2000
- Computer Action/Adventure Game of the Year: 2001–2005
- Computer Adventure Game of the Year: 1998–1999
- Computer Adventure/Role-Playing Game of the Year: 2000
- Computer Children's (Entertainment) Title of the Year: 1999-2000, 2002, 2005
- Computer Family Game of the Year: 1998–2001, 2004-2005
- Computer First-Person Action Game of the Year: 2003–2005
- Computer Role-Playing Game of the Year: 1998–1999, 2001–2005
- Computer Sports Game of the Year: 1998–2005
- Computer Creativity Title of the Year: 1998–2000
- Computer Edutainment Title of the Year: 1998
- Computer Skills Building Title of the Year: 1998
- Computer Educational Title of the Year (0-8 years): 1999
- Computer Educational Title of the Year (9-16 years): 1999
- Computer Educational Title of the Year: 2000, 2002

==== Online ====
- Online Action/Strategy Game of the Year: 1999
- Online Family/Board Game of the Year: 1999
- Online Role-Playing Game of the Year: 1999
- Entertainment Site of the Year: 1998–2000
- News/Information Site of the Year: 1998–2000
- Online Gameplay of the Year: 2001-2003

== Special categories ==
=== Hall of Fame ===
The Academy of Interactive Arts & Sciences has annually inducted into its "Hall of Fame" video game developers that have made revolutionary and innovative achievements in the video game industry.

Year	Person	Company/role	Notable games
1998	Shigeru Miyamoto	Nintendo	Mario, Donkey Kong, The Legend of Zelda, F-Zero, Star Fox, Pikmin, and Wii series
1999	Sid Meier	Founder of Firaxis Games and MicroProse	Pirates!, Railroad Tycoon, Civilization, and Alpha Centauri
2000	Hironobu Sakaguchi	Originally at Square (renamed Square Enix), Founder of Mistwalker	Final Fantasy, Chrono Trigger, Parasite Eve, Lost Odyssey, and The Last Story
2001	John D. Carmack	Founder of id Software	Commander Keen, Doom, Quake, and Rage
2002	Will Wright	Founder of Maxis	SimCity, Spore, and The Sims
2003	Yu Suzuki	Sega (head of Sega AM2 division)	Hang-On, Space Harrier, Out Run, After Burner, Power Drift, Virtua Racing, Virtua Fighter, Daytona USA, Virtua Cop, and Shenmue series
2004	Peter Molyneux	Founder of Lionhead Studios and Bullfrog Productions	Black & White, Populous, Magic Carpet, Syndicate, Dungeon Keeper, and Fable
2005	Trip Hawkins	Founder of Electronic Arts and Digital Chocolate	Madden Football
2006	Richard Garriott	Founder of Origin Systems	Ultima series and Tabula Rasa
2007	Dani Bunten (posthumous)	Founder of Ozark Softscape	M.U.L.E.
2008	Michael Morhaime	President & Co-Founder of Blizzard Entertainment	Warcraft, Starcraft, and Diablo
2009	Bruce Shelley	Ensemble Studios	Age of Empires
2010	Mark Cerny	Cerny Games	Marble Madness, Ratchet & Clank, and Jak & Daxter
2011	Ray Muzyka & Greg Zeschuk	Co-Founders of BioWare	Knights of the Old Republic, Mass Effect, and Dragon Age
2012	Tim Sweeney	Founder and CEO of Epic Games	Unreal and Gears of War series
2013	Gabe Newell	Co-Founder and CEO of Valve	Portal, Half-Life, and Left 4 Dead
2014	Sam Houser, Dan Houser and Leslie Benzies	Co-Founders of Rockstar Games	Grand Theft Auto and Bully
2016	Hideo Kojima	Founder of Kojima Productions	Metal Gear, Snatcher, Policenauts, Zone of the Enders, and Boktai
2017	Todd Howard	Director and Executive Producer at Bethesda Game Studios	The Elder Scrolls and the Fallout series
2019	Bonnie Ross	Corporate Vice-President at Microsoft, Head of 343 Industries	Halo series
2020	Connie Booth	Vice-President of Product Development at Sony Interactive Entertainment	Advocate for several of Sony's first-party franchises, including Crash Bandicoot, Spyro the Dragon, Jak and Daxter, Ratchet & Clank, and Sly Cooper
2022	Ed Boon	Creative director of NetherRealm Studios	Co-creator of the Mortal Kombat series
2023	Tim Schafer	Co-founder of Double Fine Productions	Grim Fandango, Psychonauts, Broken Age, and Psychonauts 2
2024	Koji Kondo	Nintendo composer and sound designer	Works include numerous games, including those in the Super Mario Bros. and The Legend of Zelda franchise
2025	Ted Price	Founder and CEO of Insomniac Games	Spyro the Dragon, Ratchet & Clank, Resistance: Fall of Man, and Marvel's Spider-Man series
2026	Evan Wells	Co-President of Naughty Dog	Crash Bandicoot, Jak & Daxter, Uncharted, and The Last of Us
2027	Shinji Mikami	Creative Director and CEO of Unbound, Inc.	Resident Evil, Dino Crisis, Devil May Cry, The Evil Within, Hi-Fi Rush, and Ghostwire: Tokyo

=== Lifetime Achievement Award ===
The Lifetime Achievement Award is given "for individuals whose accomplishments span a broad range of disciplines over a lengthy career in the industry".

Year	Person	Company/role
2007	Minoru Arakawa and Howard Lincoln	Former presidents of Nintendo of America
2008	Ken Kutaragi	Former Chairman/CEO of Sony Computer Entertainment and considered the "Father of the PlayStation"
2010	Doug Lowenstein	Launched and served as president of the Interactive Digital Software Association, which became the Entertainment Software Association
2011	Bing Gordon	Former Chief Creative Officer of Electronic Arts
2016	Satoru Iwata (posthumous)	Former president of Nintendo
2018	Genyo Takeda	Former General Manager of Nintendo Integrated Research & Development
2022	Phil Spencer	CEO of Microsoft Gaming
2025	Don James	Former Executive Vice-President of Nintendo of America. Heavily contributed to the creation of the ESRB and Interactive Digital Software Association, now known as the Entertainment Software Association, and its signature trade show, E3

=== Pioneer Award ===
The Pioneer Award is given "for individuals whose career spanning work has helped shape and define the interactive entertainment industry".

Year	Person	Company/role
2010	David Crane	Founder of Activision
2011	Bill Budge	Developer of Raster Blaster and Pinball Construction Set
2012	Ed Logg	Co-developer of many arcade games including Asteroids, Centipede and Gauntlet
2013	Dave Lebling & Marc Blank	Co-founders of Infocom
2014	Eugene Jarvis	Developer of arcade games Defender and Robotron: 2084
2015	Allan Alcorn	Developer of Pong and co-developed several Atari home consoles
2015	Ralph H. Baer	Creator of the first home console, the Magnavox Odyssey

=== Technical Impact Award ===
The Technical Impact Award was added for the 2015 awards ceremony to recognize "unique innovations that contribute to the ongoing progress of interactive media".

Year	Winner
2015	Apple App Store
2016	Visual Basic

=== Legend Award ===
The Legend Award is given to "an industry icon whose enduring vision continues to redefine interactive entertainment. Honoring creators whose groundbreaking achievements have already earned lasting universal acclaim, this award also celebrates their immeasurable impact and influence that is still being felt in the work of game makers and entertainers in every entertainment medium today and well into our future".

Year	Winner	Company/role
2027	Shigeru Miyamoto	Representative Director and Fellow at Nintendo

== Notable highest wins and nominations ==
=== By game ===
Most award-winning games:

Wins	Game	Year
10	The Last of Us	2014
10	Uncharted 2: Among Thieves	2010
9	God of War	2019
9	Half-Life 2	2005
8	Gears of War	2007
8	Journey	2013
8	LittleBigPlanet	2009
8	Middle-earth: Shadow of Mordor	2015
8	Prince of Persia: The Sands of Time	2004
7	God of War	2006
7	God of War Ragnarök	2023
6	Marvel's Spider-Man 2	2024
6	The Legend of Zelda: Ocarina of Time	1999
5	Astro Bot	2025
5	Baldur's Gate 3	2024
5	Clair Obscur: Expedition 33	2026
5	Elden Ring	2023
5	Guitar Hero	2006
5	Hades	2021
5	Red Dead Redemption	2011
5	SSX	2001
5	The Elder Scrolls V: Skyrim	2012

Most nominated games:

Nominations	Game	Year
15	Uncharted 2: Among Thieves	2010
13	Prince of Persia: The Sands of Time	2004
13	The Last of Us	2014
12	BioShock	2008
12	God of War	2006
12	God of War	2019
12	God of War Ragnarök	2023
12	Uncharted 3: Drake's Deception	2012
11	Half-Life 2	2005
11	Journey	2013
11	Marvel's Spider-Man	2019
11	The Last of Us Part II	2021
10	Assassin's Creed II	2010
10	Call of Duty 4: Modern Warfare	2008
10	Gears of War	2007
10	Gears of War 2	2009
10	Ghost of Tsushima	2021
10	Horizon Zero Dawn	2018
10	LittleBigPlanet	2009
10	Metroid Prime	2003
10	Portal 2	2012
10	Star Wars: Knights of the Old Republic	2004
10	Uncharted 4: A Thief's End	2017

=== By franchise ===
Most award-winning franchises:

Franchise	Wins	Games
God of War	26	6
Mario (Note: includes the Luigi's Mansion games and various Mario spin-offs)	24	24
The Legend of Zelda	17	8
Uncharted	17	3
Half-Life (Note: includes Half-Life 2: Episode Two sharing with Portal and Team Fortress 2 in The Orange Box compilation's win for "Computer Game of the Year" in 2008.)	15	5
FIFA/FC	13	13
Final Fantasy	13	7
Call of Duty	12	6
Halo	12	4
The Last of Us	12	2
Marvel	11	5
Middle-earth/The Lord of the Rings	11	3

Most nominated franchises:

Franchise	Nominations	Games
Call of Duty	79	21
Mario (Note: includes the Luigi's Mansion games and various Mario spin-offs)	74	50
The Legend of Zelda	52	16
Uncharted	50	6
God of War	48	8
Assassin's Creed	46	13
Star Wars	44	22
Marvel	42	15
Final Fantasy	41	16
Battlefield	36	11
Ratchet & Clank	36	8
Tom Clancy's	35	15

=== By developer ===
Most award-winning developers:

Developer	Wins	Games
Nintendo EAD/EPD	39	25
Naughty Dog	29	5
Santa Monica Studio	24	4
EA Canada/Vancouver	23	18
Valve	20	6
Blizzard Entertainment	17	11
BioWare	17	7
Ubisoft Montreal	16	8
Harmonix	14	7
Insomniac Games	14	6
SquareSoft/Square Enix	13	7
Bethesda Game Studios	13	5
Bungie	12	3

Most nominated developers:

Developer	Nominations	Games
Nintendo EAD/EPD	131	52
Ubisoft Montreal	103	32
Naughty Dog	85	12
EA Canada/Vancouver	78	51
Insomniac Games	77	17
SquareSoft/Square Enix	66	31
Blizzard Entertainment	57	22
BioWare	48	17
DICE	48	17
Valve	48	11
Santa Monica Studio	48	7
Infinity Ward	45	8

=== By publisher ===
The most award-winning publishers:

Publisher	Wins	Games
Sony Interactive Entertainment	147	56
Electronic Arts	114	80
Nintendo	81	62
Microsoft/Xbox Game Studios	65	42
Activision	27	17
Warner Bros. Interactive Entertainment	23	12
Ubisoft	21	13
Blizzard Entertainment	19	11
Bethesda Softworks	16	7

The most nominated publishers:

Publisher	Nominations	Games
Sony Interactive Entertainment	536	176
Electronic Arts	416	228
Nintendo	300	164
Microsoft/Xbox Game Studios	252	120
Ubisoft	186	82
Activision	173	69
SquareSoft/Square Enix	89	42
2K Games	76	43
Sega	69	42
Rockstar Games	65	13
