= Game Pill =

Canadian studio

Game Pill is a video game developer based in Toronto, Ontario, Canada. The studio was established in 2000 by Michael Sorrenti and focuses on the development of video games, interactive entertainment, and digital applications. Game Pill has worked with various companies, including Viacom, Disney, Discovery Networks, and Google has been involved in the creation of over 100 games.

== History ==
Game Pill is an independent studio offers a range of services, including prototyping, game design, user experience (UX) and user interface (UI) design, marketing, and live operations. The company also engages in the development of connected toys, gamification, and enterprise applications, which include training simulations, digital product walkthroughs, and Web3 experiences. They developed games for various brands, including Nickelodeon, Neopets, Fisher-Price, and GSN. Notable titles include "Tattoo Artist" for Addicting Games, "Pizza Perfect" for Nickelodeon, "Deal or No Deal Slots" for GSN, and "Tanked" for the Discovery Channel and Animal Planet. Additionally the studio has created digital toys for companies such as Sago Mini and Fisher-Price.

== Games ==
Game Pill projects often involve collaborations with other companies. One of its recent independent game is "Hangry," a role-playin game that features a character named Hangry on an intergalactic quest to hunt food-themed monsters. Developed using Unreal Engine, the game includes elements of monsters hunting and utilizing the monsters as ingredients for a diner in an underworld setting. "Hangry" was showcased at The MIX during the Game Developers Conference (GDC) in San Francisco.

Another title developed by Game Pill is the "Tanked Aquarium Game App." created in collaboration with Discovery Communications and Nancy Glass Productions. This game is based on the Animal Planet series "Tanked" and enables players to design and manage virtual aquariums.

Additionally, the studio developed "Almost Naked Animals: Supergame," a side-scrolling advertising adventure game inspired by the animated series "Almost Naked Animals." This project was a collaboration with 9 Story Entertainment.

== Awards ==
• Game Pill received the Addicting Game Showdown award for the game "Tattoo Artist."
