= Meggan Scavio =

American business executive

Meggan Scavio is an American business executive who is the president and chief executive officer of the Academy of Interactive Arts & Sciences (AIAS). Prior to leading the AIAS, Scavio worked with UBM plc for eighteen years, where she was most recently general manager for the Game Developers Conference events.

== Career ==
Scavio began her career with the Game Developers Conference (GDC) in 2000, as an operations manager and a liaison for GDC's Conference Associate program. She was appointed event director of GDC in 2007, succeeding Jamil Moledina, and first directed its 2009 event held in San Francisco.

Scavio was appointed general manager of GDC events in 2011. As general manager, she oversaw events in the United States, Europe, and China, as well as GDC Online and the Virtual Reality Developers Conference. She departed from UBM plc (GDC's parent company) in June 2017, having worked in eighteen GDC events since 2000. The next month, Scavio was named as president and chief executive officer of the Academy of Interactive Arts & Sciences (AIAS), which organizes the annual D.I.C.E. Summit. She is also one of the founders of Amplifying New Voices, a professional development program targeting video game developers from underrepresented groups. The program is currently managed by the AIAS Foundation.

In 2018, Variety listed Scavio as one of the "Most Influential in Video Games", recognizing her work in "[bringing] more diversity and inclusivity to the games business".
