= Sanzaru Games =

American video game development company

Sanzaru Games, Inc.
- Type: Subsidiary
- Industry: Video games
- Founded: November 9, 2006; 19 years ago
- Defunct: January 13, 2026
- Fate: Dissolved
- Successor: Sneaky Devil Studios
- Headquarters: Foster City, California, U.S.
- Number of locations: 3 studios (2018)
- Key people: Glen Egan (CEO); Bill Spence (COO)
- Products: Sly Cooper: Thieves in Time; Sonic Boom: Shattered Crystal; Asgard's Wrath
- Owner: Meta Platforms
- Number of employees: 60 (2010)
- Parent: Oculus Studios
- Subsidiaries: Kitazaru
- Website: sanzaru.com

Sanzaru Games, Inc. was an American video game developer founded in 2006 by former Activision developers and based in Foster City, California. The company name was based on the three wise monkeys, called sanzaru (三猿) in Japanese. Additionally, the company also had an office in Dublin, California and operated a satellite studio in Ottawa, Ontario, called Kitazaru.

In February 2020, Sanzaru was acquired by Facebook (now Meta) and placed in its Reality Labs division under Oculus Studios. On January 13, 2026, it was reported that Meta had closed the studio. Former developers later went on to form a new studio, Sneaky Devil Studios.

== History ==
Sanzaru Games was founded on November 9, 2006 by a group of seven former Activision developers, mostly from Z-Axis (including Sanzaru CEO Glen Egan), and began operations in January 2007. In addition to the founders, Sanzaru was staffed by other former Z-Axis employees. Their first game was Ninja Reflex, released on March 1, 2008, for PC, Nintendo DS and Wii. Their second game was a port of the High Impact Games developed PlayStation Portable game Secret Agent Clank, released on May 26, 2009, for PlayStation 2. Their third game was a high definition remastered collection of the Sly Cooper games originally developed by Sucker Punch Productions for the PlayStation 2, titled The Sly Collection and released on November 9, 2010, for PlayStation 3 and PlayStation Vita. Their fourth game was Mystery Case Files: The Malgrave Incident, which they assisted in development with Big Fish Games on, and released on June 27, 2011, for Wii. Their fifth game is Sly Cooper: Thieves in Time, which was set to be released late 2012, but was delayed to February 2013. Their latest game was revealed as a remake of Spyro: Year of the Dragon, which was included in the Spyro Reignited trilogy.

On October 10, 2019, the company released Asgard's Wrath, a VR action adventure title on the Oculus Rift.

On February 25, 2020, the company was acquired by Facebook as part of its Oculus Studios.

On January 13, 2026, Sanzaru Games, along with sibling Oculus studios Armature Studio and Twisted Pixel Games, were shut down as part of layoffs at Reality Labs, which includes Oculus Studios.

On May 11, less than four months after Sanzaru's closure, former developer Mat Kraemer announced the formation of Sneaky Devil Studios, with other former Sanzaru staff.

== Games ==
Year	Game title	Platform(s)	Ref.
2008	Ninja Reflex	Wii, Nintendo DS, PC	
2009	Secret Agent Clank	PlayStation 2	
2010	Mystery Case Files: The Malgrave Incident	Wii	
2010	The Sly Collection	PlayStation 3	
2013	Sly Cooper: Thieves in Time	PS3, PlayStation Vita	
2013	Dark Manor	iOS	
2013	Bentley's Hackpack	PS3, PS Vita, Android, iOS	
2014	God of War Collection	PS Vita	
2014	The Sly Collection	PS Vita	
2014	Sonic Boom: Shattered Crystal	Nintendo 3DS	
2016	Sonic Boom: Fire & Ice	Nintendo 3DS	
2016	Ripcoil	Oculus Rift	
2016	VR Sports Challenge	Oculus Rift	
2016	Tron RUN/r	PC, PlayStation 4, Xbox One	
2018	Marvel Powers United VR	Oculus Rift	
2018	Spyro Reignited Trilogy (Year of the Dragon)	PS4, Xbox One	
2019	Spyro Reignited Trilogy (Year of the Dragon)	PC, Nintendo Switch	
2019	Asgard's Wrath	Oculus Rift	
2023	Asgard's Wrath 2	Meta Quest 3	
