= Academy of Interactive Arts & Sciences =

Organization of the video game industry

- Formation: 1991; 35 years ago
- Founder: Andrew S. Zucker
- Headquarters: 3183 Wilshire Blvd.
- Location: Los Angeles, California, U.S.
- Members: 30,000 (2020)
- President: Meggan Scavio (since 2017)
- Website: interactive.org

The Academy of Interactive Arts & Sciences (AIAS) is an American non-profit organization of video game industry professionals. It organizes the annual Design Innovate Communicate Entertain Summit, better known as D.I.C.E., which includes the presentations of the D.I.C.E. Awards.

== History ==
Andrew S. Zucker, an attorney in the entertainment industry, founded the Academy of Interactive Arts & Sciences in 1991 and served as its first president. AIAS co-promoted numerous events with organizations such as the Academy of Television Arts and Sciences, the Directors Guild of America, and Women in Film. Their first awards show program, Cybermania '94, which was hosted by Leslie Nielsen and Jonathan Taylor Thomas, was broadcast on TBS in 1994. While a second show was run in 1995 and was the first awards program to be streamed over the Web, it drew far fewer audiences than the first.

Video game industry leaders decided that they wanted to reform AIAS as a non-profit organization for the video game industry. The effort was backed by Peter Main of Nintendo, Tom Kalinske of Sega, and Doug Lowenstein, founder of the Entertainment Software Association (ESA), and with funding support from ESA. The AIAS was formally reestablished on November 19, 1996, with Marc Teren as president, soon replaced by game developer Glenn Entis. Initially, in 1998, AIAS' role was to handle the awards, originally known as the Interactive Achievement Awards. These awards were nominated and selected by game developers that are members of the organization themselves, mimicking how the Academy Awards are voted for by its members.

Around 2000, the ESA pulled out of funding AIAS, leading AIAS members Richard Hilleman and Lorne Lanning to suggest that AIAS create the D.I.C.E. Summit (short for "Design Innovate Communicate Entertain"), a convention centered around the presentation of the awards to providing funding for the organization. The Summit was aimed at industry executives and lead as a means to provide networking between various companies. The D.I.C.E. Summit launched in 2002 in Las Vegas, Nevada and has been run on an annual basis since. In addition to video games, AIAS saw these summits as a way to connect video games to other entertainment industries.

Joseph Olin served as the AIAS president from 2004 to 2010; following his departure, Martin Rae was named president in 2012. Rae opted to implement a number of changes to the Summit, shorting talk times to give more attention to the speakers, and rebranding the awards as the D.I.C.E. Awards for the 2013 summit. Mike Fischer replaced Rae as president in 2016.

As of 2017, AIAS's mission is "to promote and advance the worldwide interactive entertainment community, recognize outstanding achievements in the interactive arts and sciences, and host an annual awards show, the DICE Awards, to enhance awareness of games as an interactive art form".

== D.I.C.E. Summit ==
D.I.C.E. Summit
- Status: Active
- Genre: Video games
- Venue: Aria Resort and Casino
- Locations: Las Vegas, Nevada, US
- Country: United States
- Inaugurated: 2002; 24 years ago
- Most recent: February 12, 2026
- Organizer: Academy of Interactive Arts & Sciences

The D.I.C.E. Summit is an annual multi-day gathering of video game executives held in Las Vegas. Established in 2002 by AIAS, the conference is host to the annual Interactive Achievement Awards, which has since been rebranded as the D.I.C.E. Awards. The conference differs from other conferences in the industry in its emphasis on the business and production end of the industry, with a focus on trends and innovations in video game design. The conference specializes in providing a more intimate, orderly venue for select industry leaders to network.

=== Structure ===
In 2007, a keynote speaker was added to open the event, which had traditionally begun with recreation before the introduction of presentations and panels.

Year	Speaker	Occupation / role
2007	Yair Landau	Vice-President of Sony Pictures Entertainment and President of Sony Pictures Digital
2008	Gore Verbinski	Film director
2009	Gabe Newell	President, Valve
2010	Bobby Kotick	CEO of Activision Blizzard
2011	Mike Morhaime	CEO & Co-Founder, Blizzard Entertainment
2012	Todd Howard	Game Director & Executive Producer, Bethesda Game Studios
2013	Gabe Newell	President, Valve
2013	J. J. Abrams	Film director
2014	Hilmar Veigar Pétursson	CEO, CCP Games
2015	Brandon Beck	CEO, Riot Games
2016	Hideo Kojima	Game creator/director
2016	Guillermo del Toro	Film director
2017	Jeff Kaplan	Vice-President, Blizzard Entertainment
2018	Phil Spencer	Executive Vice-President of Gaming, Microsoft
2019	Shawn Layden	Chairman of SIE Worldwide Studios
2022	Todd Howard	Director & Executive Producer, Bethesda Game Studios

=== Corporate members ===
Current list of corporate members (as of April 13, 2026):

- Activision Blizzard
- Annapurna Interactive
- Ascendant Studios
- Bethesda Softworks
- Blind Squirrel Games
- Bungie
- Disbelief
- Electronic Arts
- Enhance Games
- Epic Games
- Game Pill
- Gearbox Entertainment
- GoodbyeWorld Games
- Grumpy Pixel
- iNK Stories
- Insomniac Games
- Microsoft Studios
- Netmarble
- Ninja Theory
- Nintendo
- Obsidian Entertainment
- ProbablyMonsters
- Proletariat
- Ready at Dawn
- Riot Games
- Romero Games
- Schell Games
- Skydance Interactive
- Sony Computer Entertainment
- Square Enix
- Take-Two Interactive
- That's No Moon
- Ubisoft
- Valve
- Wargaming
- Warner Bros. Interactive Entertainment

==== Former corporate members ====
- 505 Games
- Six Foot
- Big Fish Games
- Campo Santo
- Capcom
- Daglow Entertainment
- Day 1 Studios
- Digital Capital
- Digital Continue
- Disney Interactive
- Double Fine Productions
- Gas Powered Games
- Gree
- Google
- Harmonix
- Kabam
- MWM
- Nexon
- Phosphor Games Studio
- Playdead
- Pixel Reef
- PopCap Games
- Psyonix
- Red Barrels
- Remedy Entertainment
- Robot Entertainment
- Sega
- Streamline Media Group
- Sucker Punch Productions
- Tencent Boston
- THQ
- Twisted Pixel Games
- Versus Evil
- VRWERX
