= Entwined (video game) =

2014 rhythm game

- Developer: Pixelopus
- Publisher: Sony Computer Entertainment
- Director: Dominic Robilliard
- Composer: Sam Marshall
- Engine: Unity
- Platforms: PlayStation 4; PlayStation 3; PlayStation Vita; Android; iOS
- Release: PlayStation 4: NA: June 9, 2014; PAL: June 10, 2014; JP: June 19, 2014; PlayStation 3 & PlayStation Vita: NA: July 22, 2014; PAL: July 23, 2014; JP: July 24, 2014; Android, iOS: WW: October 3, 2014
- Genre: Rhythm
- Mode: Single-player

Entwined is a 2014 rhythm video game developed by Pixelopus and published by Sony Computer Entertainment for the PlayStation 4. It was ported to the PlayStation 3 and PlayStation Vita in July 2014. The game was announced at Sony's E3 media briefing on June 9, 2014 and was released worldwide on the PlayStation Store for the PlayStation 4 on the same day. The PlayStation 3 and PlayStation Vita version were released approximately a month later, and since Entwined is a cross-buy title, these two versions are available at no extra cost for anyone who has purchased the PlayStation 4 version. Versions for Android and iOS titled Entwined Challenge, which consist of a challenge mode with a new scoring system and unlockables were released in 2014 by Sony.

== Gameplay ==
The player is tasked with guiding the two souls simultaneously, one with each analog stick, to bring them together over the course of many lifetimes. The left analog stick controls the fish, while the right analog stick controls the bird.

== Plot ==
The story is about two souls, a bird and a fish, that are in love but can't be together. Once united, the two souls will transform into a magnificent soaring dragon.

== Development and release ==
In 2012, SIE's Foster City Studio (now known as San Mateo Studio) product development group decided to work with small development teams following the success of Journey (2012) developed by the small studio, Thatgamecompany, and published by Santa Monica Studio. Soon after, SIE's Foster City sponsored a game development program for students at Carnegie Mellon University. They provided PlayStation Vitas for students to experiment with; Foster City were jubilant with students' ability in to rapidly prototype game ideas. In July 2013, Foster City offered six students from the development program at the Carnegie Mellon University and three students from San Jose State University. Additionally, a pair of industry veterans were hired to lead the 9-man team, forming PixelOpus.

Entwined was released for the PlayStation 3, PlayStation 4, and PlayStation Vita in June 2014.

== Reception ==
Reception

Aggregate score
Aggregator	Score
Metacritic	(Vita) 62/100 (PS4) 59/100

Review scores
Publication	Score
Destructoid	4.5/10
Edge	5/10
Electronic Gaming Monthly	3.5/10
Eurogamer	4/10
Game Informer	5.5/10
GameRevolution	5/5
GameSpot	7/10
GameZone	7.5/10
IGN	6/10
Joystiq	3/5
PlayStation Official Magazine – UK	5/10
The Escapist	3/5
National Post	5/10

Entwined received "mixed" reviews according to the review aggregation website Metacritic.

The Digital Fix gave it a score of eight out of ten and said that the game "blends its gameplay, visuals and soundtrack into one beautiful piece of art that should be experienced by anyone who has the chance to play it." However, The Escapist gave it three stars out of five and stated, "While its skin-deep qualities suggest something artistic and maybe a little philosophical, this middling arcade game packs not enough wallop to be worth more than a bit of a shrug. While not awful, it's certainly not intriguing enough to maintain interest even in spite of a brief running time." National Post gave it five out of ten and stated that the game "never manages to deliver much beyond art and beauty."
