= Apfelbaum =

Apfelbaum (German: apple tree) is a German and Jewish surname. It may refer to:

== Apfelbaum ==
- Anna Apfelbaum (1897–1987), Polish fashion designer and co-founder of Maximilian Furs, New York
- Jay Apfelbaum (born 1951), American bridge player
- Grigory Zinoviev (1883–1936), also known as Ovsei-Gershon Aronovich Randomsky, born Hirsch Apfelbaum, Soviet politician
- Maximilian Apfelbaum (d.1953) Polish furrier and co-founder of Maximilian Furs, New York
- Peter Apfelbaum (1960–), American jazz musician and composer
- Polly Apfelbaum (1955–), American visual artist
- Stacy Apfelbaum, American athlete

== Appelbaum ==
- Binyamin Appelbaum, American journalist
- Diana Muir Appelbaum, American author and historian
- Eileen Appelbaum (born 1940), American economist
- Ian Appelbaum, American physicist
- Jacob Appelbaum (1983–), American hacker, Core Tor member
- Jodi Appelbaum-Steinbauer (born 1956), American professional tennis player
- Joseph Appelbaum (1936–), Israeli engineer
- Josh Appelbaum, American screenwriter
- Judith Appelbaum (1939–2018), American editor and author
- LaDonna Appelbaum (1967–), American politician
- Lilly Appelbaum (1928–), Belgian Holocaust survivor
- Paul S. Appelbaum, American psychiatrist
- Ralph Appelbaum, American museum designer and planner
- Richard A. Appelbaum, Rear Admiral in the United States Coast Guard.
- Robert Appelbaum (born 1952), American literary critic and academic
- Stephen A. Appelbaum (1926–2000) American psychologist
- Yoni Appelbaum, American editor

== Apelbaum ==
- Sam Apelbaum, Canadian politician

== Epel'baum (Эпельбаум) ==
- Mikhail Apelbaum (1894–1957), Soviet Jewish singer and actor
- Naum Moiseevich Epelbaum (1927–2019), Soviet Moldavian sculptor
- Brunhilda Petrovna Epelbaum-Marchenko (1927–1914), Soviet Moldavian sculptor and painter

== See also ==
- Applebaum
