= Anna Guzik (variety artist) =

Soviet-Jewish and Israeli actress (1909–1994)

Anna Guzik

Anna Guzik (Yiddish: אַננאַ גוזיק or חנה גוזיק, Russian: Анна Яковлевна Гузик, 1909–1994) was a Soviet variety artist, Russian and Yiddish theatre actress, and recording artist. Like Zinovy Shulman, Nechama Lifshitz, Sidi Tal, and Emil Gorovets, she had a career performing Jewish music and plays on the Soviet stage which was marked by various periods of censorship and official support depending on the political climate.

== Biography ==
Guzik was born on April 15, 1909, in Kharkiv, or possibly in Minsk, Russian Empire. Her mother was Rosalia Freilich and her father, Yaakov Guzik, was leader of a Yiddish theatre troupe; both had been students of Abraham Goldfaden. Anna made her first stage appearance in 1921 and her first professionally in her father's troupe in a production of a Goldfaden piece in 1924. In the late 1920s the family's troupe was closed by authorities for being Bourgeois, and she turned to performing Jewish material for the Red Guards. She became known as a variety artist who would read short monologues or scenes, sing Yiddish language folk songs, and perform Russian language comedies. She would play both male and female roles and was known for quickly improvising as part of her acts.

She toured the Soviet Union in the 1930s with a Jewish folklore troupe and performed in various operettas and variety acts. She played in 1932 in the Leningrad Musical Comedy Theatre and in 1935 in operettas in Kyiv and Kharkiv. She won a prize in the All-Russian Variety Artists Competition in 1939. She spent the early part of World War II acting in Leningrad, but then traveled to central Asia and performed for a time in Tashkent. In the early postwar era she continued to perform in the Soviet Union. After the arrest of Jewish comedians Shimon Dzigan and Israel Shumacher, the arranger and pianist Shaul Berezovsky briefly joined her troupe and became her main accompanist. However, Jewish performances were discouraged by authorities after 1950, and for several years she barely performed at all. Her performance in Georgia in September 1950 was apparently one of the last Jewish concerts given during the Stalin era.

In 1954 there was a reversal in policy and Jewish performances began to be allowed again; after that she toured successfully with a variety act once again. She became a major figure in the revival of Jewish culture in the post-Stalin era; her major touring programme was called Farblondzhete shtern (Wandering Stars) and was based on the work of Sholem Aleichem. However, in that era Jewish material was subject to strict censorship and was forced to include a significant amount of Russian-language material as well; nevertheless, she fought to include Yiddish folk songs in her performances. One of her only recordings of the postwar era was with Emil Gorovets, who included her on a late 1950s LP which was re-released in the United States by Monitor Records.

After she refused to condemn Israel during the Six-Day War in 1967, her performance schedule was greatly reduced. However, she continued to occasionally give sold-out concerts into the early 1970s.

She emigrated to Israel in 1973. She did not find as much success as a performing artist there; however, she did collaborate on some productions with other Soviet émigré artists such as Mikhail Alexandrovich.

She died in Tel Aviv on March 15, 1994.
