= Arkady Gendler =

Ukrainian Yiddish singer

Arkady Gendler אַבֿרהם הענדלער
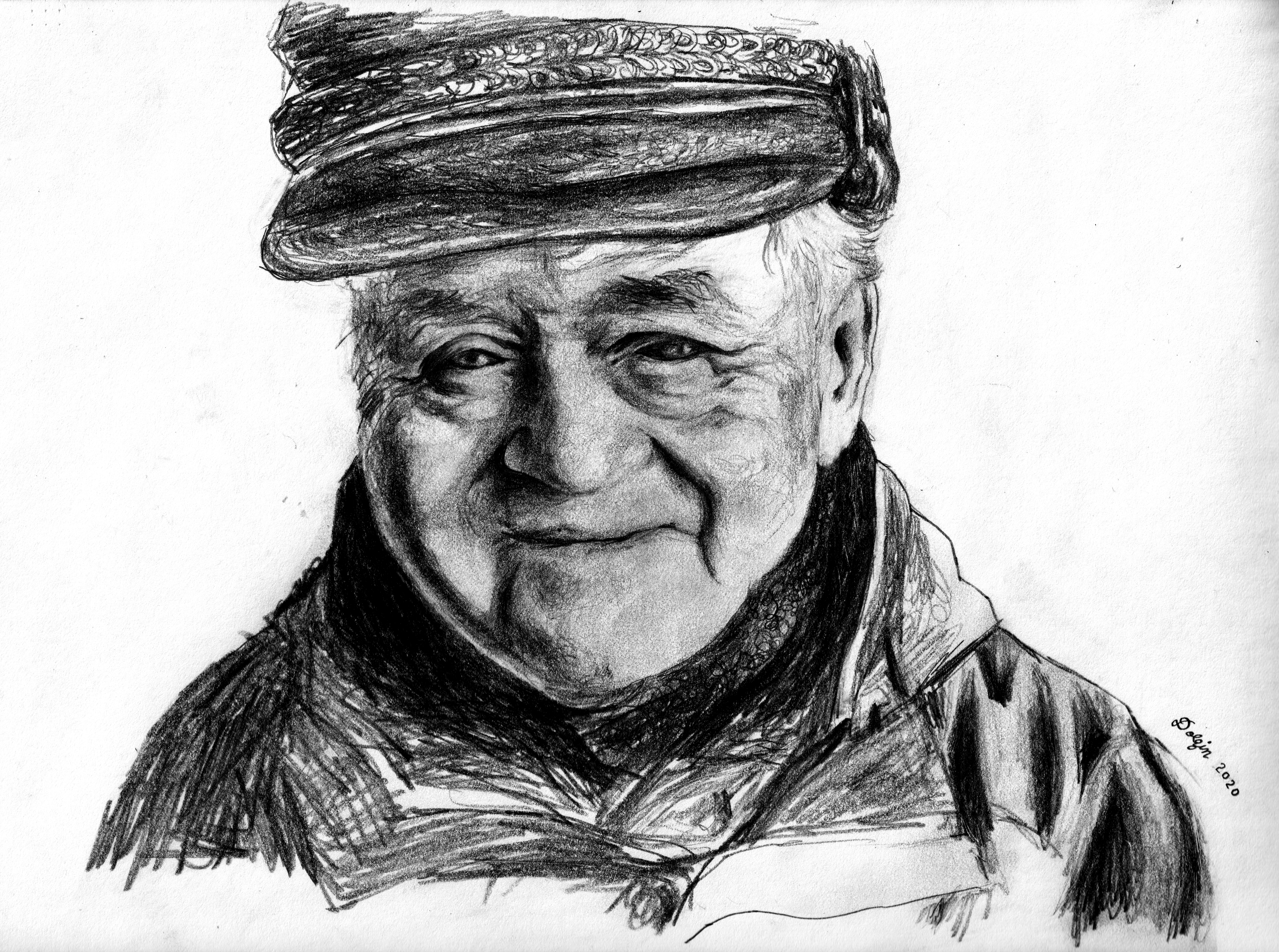

Background information
- Born: 29 November 1921; Soroca, Romania (now in Moldova)
- Died: 22 May 2017 (aged 95) Zaporizhzhia
- Genre: Yiddish song
- Occupations: chemical engineer, singer, teacher
- Instrument: voice

Arkady Gendler (29 November 1921 – 22 May 2017, Russian: Аркадий Хунович Гендлер Arkadiĭ Khunovich Gendler, Yiddish: אַבֿרהם הענדלער Avram Hendler) was a Soviet and Ukrainian Yiddish-language singer, composer, and folk song collector. Born in Romania, he lived most of his life in Zaporizhzhia, Ukraine, and only became known internationally as a Yiddish singer after Perestroika. In the early 21st century he was considered a living link to the prewar Romanian and Soviet Yiddish musical worlds.

== Biography ==
=== Early life ===
Arkady Gendler was born on 29 November 1921 in Soroca, Romania (now in Moldova). He came from a poor Jewish family; he was the tenth child of parents Rokhl and Elkhonen; much of their extended family were tailors. They generally spoke Yiddish at home and Romanian anywhere else; at that time he did not yet speak Russian. As a youth he was a singer in a Soroca theatre troupe along with his siblings; the group would stage at least two productions per year. Gendler did not receive a formal musical education, but his family was very musical and would often sing as an informal choir. He also studied Hebrew in a religious Talmud Torah school. As a youth, he met many of the important Yiddish artistic figures from the region, including Itzik Manger, Eliezer Steinbarg, Zelig Bardichever, Leibu Levin and Hertz Grosbard, and saw traveling Yiddish theatre troupes perform as well as the tenor Joseph Schmidt. Gendler was already interested in politics as a child and joined a Communist youth organization at age 10. He attended a Romanian-language primary school until he was forced to drop out for lack of tuition money at age 11; after that he became a tailor.

With the Soviet occupation of Bessarabia and Northern Bukovina his region was annexed from Romania into the Soviet Union; he continued to work as a tailor until he was drafted along with his brother Dovid in the summer of 1941. His sister Brokhe was also sent to serve in a medical unit. In October 1941 Arkady was wounded by shrapnel near Millerovo and sent to a rear supply detail where he became a lathe operator. Almost the entire rest of his family were killed by the Nazis in Soroca; only the three of them who had served in the Red Army survived.

=== Soviet Union ===
After the end of the war he finished a high school degree, significantly improved his command of Russian and then studied chemistry at the D. Mendeleev University of Chemical Technology of Russia in Moscow. Rather than stay in Moscow, he accepted a position as a chemical engineer at a plant in Zaporizhzhia. In 1952 he moved there with his wife Beyle, where he would live for the rest of his life. During this time he continued to enjoy singing Yiddish informally; however, with a new policy of cultural repression there was little possibility of open or professional performances in the Soviet Union of the 1950s. Some officially-sanctioned artists still toured at times; he saw Leibu Levin, whom he knew from his childhood in Romania, perform again along with the singer Nechama Lifshitz. The Soviet Yiddish musical style of those artists and others like Mikhail Alexandrovich or Zinovy Shulman had a lasting influence on him. Gendler also continued to collect Yiddish folk and theatre songs during this time.

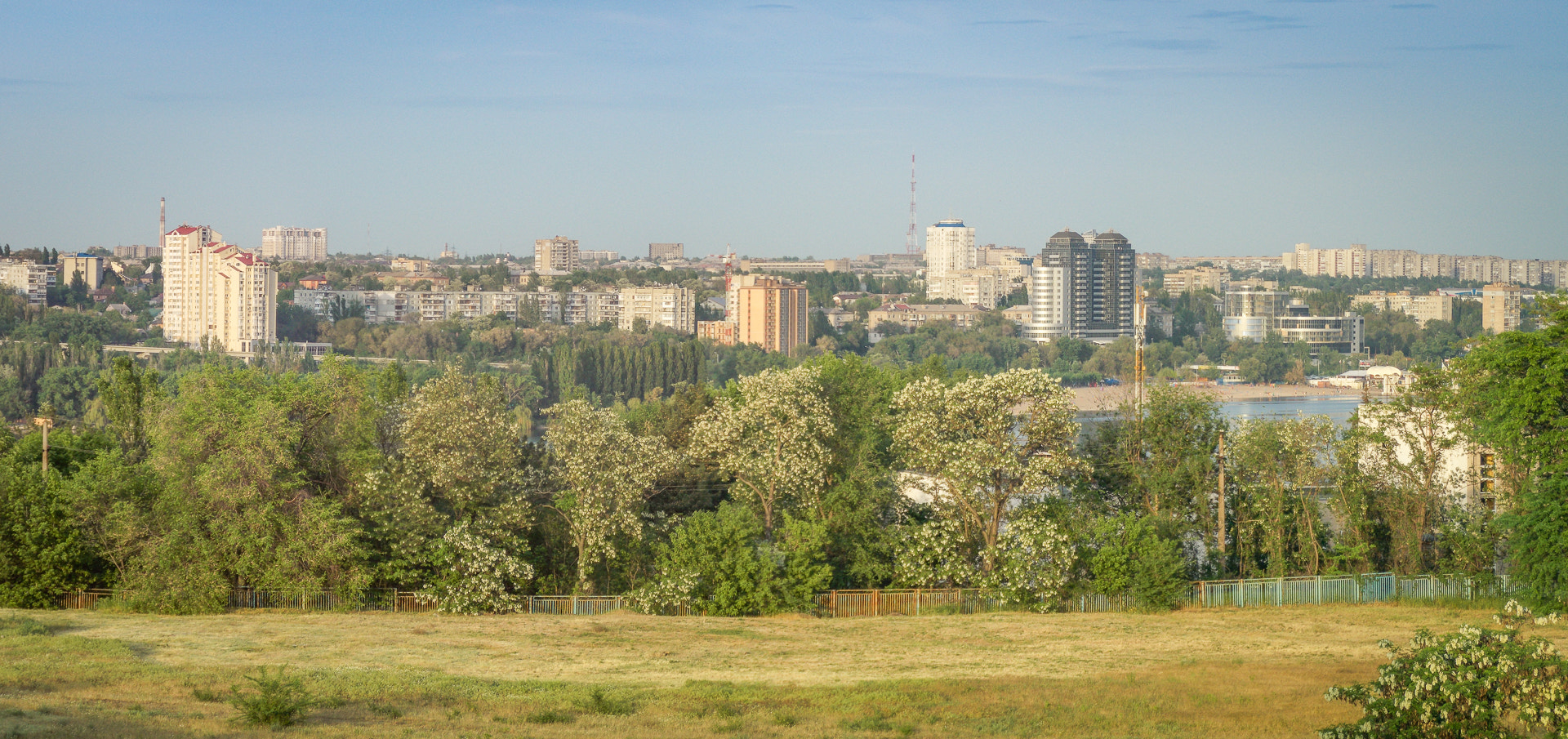
Zapirizhzhia in 2018

=== Post-Soviet era ===
With the advent of Perestroika he retired from work as a chemical engineer and in 1992 began to teach Yiddish in a Jewish school "Aleph" in Zaporizhzhia. He was a strong believer in educating younger generations in Yiddish and passing on its rich culture to them. As well, he brought his decades of work in Yiddish song to the public. He helped found KlezFest in Saint Petersburg starting in 1997; this brought him, his singing ability and his impressive repertoire of folk songs to a wider audience. He cofounded a music ensemble in Zaporizhzhia, and was soon invited to perform at festivals in Western Europe and the United States; notably, Ellie Shapiro, producer of the Jewish Music Festival in Berkeley, California, saw him perform in Saint Petersburg and invited him to the US, his first appearance there in 2000. It was at this time that Gendler, noticing how often the same Yiddish songs were performed at festivals, began to compose his own and to perform them. He made his first CD in 2000 at the Jewish Music Festival in Berkeley, titled My Hometown Soroke. Accompanied by accordionist and singer Jeannette Lewicki, Gendler sang folk songs and pieces by Itzik Manger and Zelik Barditshever, including a previously forgotten song by Manger, as well as some of Gendler's own compositions. Other notable international appearances were at Yiddish Summer Weimar in 2006 and 2009, on a Klezmer Cruise on the Dnieper in 2007, at KlezKanada in 2007 and at the Jewish Culture Festival in Kraków in 2010.

In the early 2010s, the German Klezmer clarinetist Christian Dawid decided to embark on a project to record Gendler's 11 original songs with new arrangements. Dawid and his collaborators decided that the style of the accompaniment should not be a specifically Jewish or Klezmer one, but rather resembling the cosmopolitan popular music Gendler grew up with, which were reflected in his compositions. Dawid's arrangements were recorded with the singer and a small ensemble in Vienna in late 2011. A book of the songs and arrangements was also published by Golden Horn Records.

Gendler died in Zaporizhzhia on 22 May 2017 at 95 years old.

== Recordings ==
- Mayn shtetele Soroke/My Hometown Soroke (Berkeley Richmond Jewish Community Center, 2001)
- Freyen zikh iz gut! Arkadi Gendler zingt Zelik Barditshevers lider/It's so good to be happy! Arkady Gendler sings Zelik Bardichever's songs (DVD, Jewish Community Center of St. Petersburg, 2009)
- Yidishe Lider (Golden Horn Records, 2013)
