= Lev Pulver =

Russian composer

Lev Mikhailovich Pulver (Yiddish pronunciation: Leib Pulver, Yiddish: לייב פּולווער, European spelling: Leo Pulver, Russian: Лев Михайлович Пульвер; 18 December 1883, Verkhnodniprovsk – 18 March 1970, Moscow), was a Soviet and Russian-Jewish composer and musician.

== Early life ==
He was an offspring of a renowned klezmorim's family.

Pulver studied violin since early childhood, at first with his father; later on, he studied with his brother-in-law, a disciple of Czech violinist Otakar Ševčík. Pulver graduated from Saint Petersburg Conservatory, where he studied violin and composition under Anatoly Lyadov.

Initially, he was a violinist and composer in a wandering Ukrainian theatre group. Later on, he was a symphonic concert-master and conductor, a founding member of the Stradivari Quartet. He was the musical director of the State Jewish Theatre in Moscow (the GOSET).

== Compositions ==
Pulver composed incidental music for works including Shakespeare's King Lear; Sholem Aleichem's 200.000 and The Man of the Air; Adventures of Benjamin the Third after Mendele Mocher Sforim; Abraham Goldfaden's The Sorceress (in collaboration with Joseph Achron); and Zalman Shneyer's Freylekhs (in collaboration with Maximilian Steinberg). He also composed operettas (Gulliver, Inside the Big Top, What is her name?), movie scores, songs, and Yiddish folk-song arrangements. Some of his tunes have been considered as Jewish folklore. He was one of the important musicians bridging the traditional Eastern European Jewish music with the Western classical music forms.

== Artists about Lev Pulver ==
L.M. Pulver has a sophisticated sense of incidental music's essence./ ... /.Pulver is especially aware of those moments in scenic plots when a direct calling for the music to sound is there. Moreover, this is not surprising: he started playing since nine years of age as a wandering weddings-musician. Thereafter, while being an already accomplished musician, he went on with playing in theaters, first at the orchestra of the Ukrainian Opera, then at the Bolshoi Theatre in Moscow. His theatrical experience left a lasting impression on all of his works. His music is effectively theatrical.

— Solomon Mikhoels

... (My) father started a job at Mikhoels' Jewish Theatre .That theatre might have been considered as a musical one. In charge of the orchestra and of all the musical life (there) was an energetic gifted man – Lev Pulver. All of the music was written by him, and he conducted as well. Their productions reminded of the today's musicals.

— Kirill Kondrashin

== Recordings ==
A few recordings of his music are available featuring the performances of the GOSET orchestra with Solomon Mikhoels and Benjamin Zuskin, as well as by singers Solomon Khromchenko, Mikhail Alexandrovich, Nechama Lifshitz, Marina Gordon and actors Emil Gorovets and Boris Landau.
