= Zelig Bardichever =

Yiddish poet and composer (1903–1937)

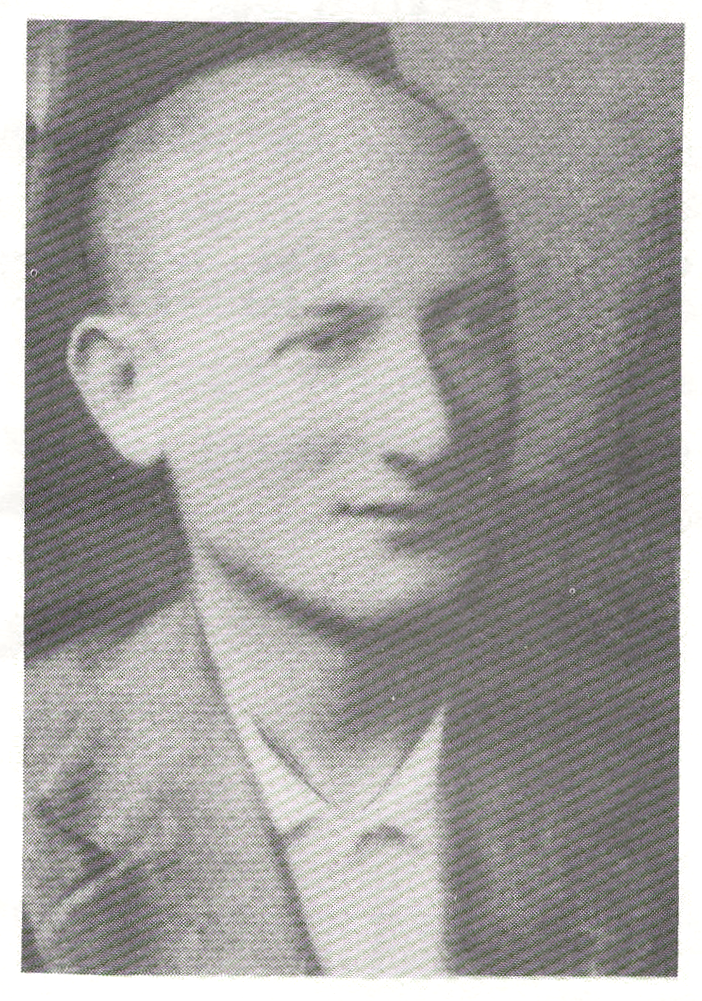
Zelig Bardichever, Yiddish-language poet and singer

Zelig Leib Bardichever (Yiddish: זעליק לייב באַרדיטשעװער; 1903–1937) was a Yiddish poet and composer from Bessarabia. His simple yet elegant poems and songs were written in a folkloric style and described the lives and poverty of artisans and common Jews, and of details of life in Romanian towns in years gone by. Although he died young and many of his songs were not properly documented, some of them were published and performed by Leibu Levin and others who had heard and learned them during Bardichever's lifetime.

== Biography ==
=== Early life ===
Bardichever was born into a poor family in Bălți, Bessarabia, Russian Empire on June 6, 1903; there are conflicting sources. His father, Ayzik-Duvid Haskelevich Bardichever, was an oil merchant who was born in Mohyliv-Podilskyi, Podolian Governorate. His mother, Haya-Rivka Berkovna Bardichever, was a native of Bălți. Zelig studied in Cheder and Yeshiva as a youth. He began composing his own songs and hymns at a very young age, and developed his appreciation for music through Russian, Moldovan and Yiddish folk songs. At first, rather than an artist he became a Melamed and teacher of Hebrew and Yiddish. Among his students from that time was the future Israeli literary critic A. B. Yoffe.

=== Poet and musician career ===
In the 1920s, he began to compose and perform songs to his own poems in a more organized manner, in the tradition of wandering Jewish folk singers—Broderzingers such as Velvl Zbarzher, Elyakum Zunzer, and Berl Broder. Although they were his original compositions, they were done in a "folksy" style that made them spread easily among other singers, and they became popular among Jewish workers and apprentices in Romania. Other songs, such as his Doyne, drew on themes from Romanian folk music.

By the 1930s, despite not publishing his work anywhere, Bardichever's songs continued to grow in popularity. He also wrote melodies to poems of other poets, for example, to the popular elegy "Fun shheinishn Dorf" ( From a neighboring village ) by Hertz Rivkin . In his early thirties he was a regular actor with the Yasser Kultur-lige (Iași culture league), he wrote and staged amateur plays, including some drawing on the work of Sholem Aleichem. During that time he befriended such Yiddish Theatre figures as Jacob Sternberg. It was only in the last years of his life that he began to publish in the newspapers Chernovitser Bleter (from Chernivtsi) and Ufgang (from Sighet).

Bardichever became ill with tuberculosis in Iasi in 1937. On his deathbed in the Jewish hospital in Iasi, he called acquaintances of his to dictate some of his songs and poems. However, those notes apparently did not survive. There were other Soviet sources which stated that manuscripts of his music had been destroyed during the Second World War.

== Legacy ==
After his death, Bardichever's songs were published through the efforts of singer and composer Leibu Levin and writer Hersh Segal in Chernivtsi, then part of the Kingdom of Romania. This short collection, based mostly on the songs Levin had learned and performed while Bardichever was still alive, was first printed in 1939 and later reprinted in Montevideo in 1948 and Rehovot in 1980. Unfortunately, it was only a small selection of his total work, most of which have been lost, and one song was cut by Romanian censors. Because it was assembled from memory after Bardichever's death, there may be aspects of the melodies or text which differed from how he performed them.

In the decades since his death, a number of Bardichever's songs have been performed by Yiddish singers in the Soviet Union, Israel and the United States, including Leibu Levin, Ben Bonus, Nechama Lifshitz, Chava Alberstein, Arkady Gendler, Bina Landau, Mikhail Alexandrovich and others. The Romanian-born Yiddish theatre actor Aryeh Laish also recorded an entire album of Bardichever songs in the 1960s called Freyen zikh iz git. In 2009, a DVD was released in Russia with a concert of Arkady Gendler performing Bardichever's songs.

== Literature ==
- לידער מיט ניגונים (Лидер мит нигуним — Стихи и мелодии). Черновицы, 1939 (Монтевидео: Фарлаг "Зрие", 1948).
- Летящие тени: Стихи еврейских поэтов Бессарабии в переводе с идиша Рудольфа Ольшевского. Кишинёв, 2000.
- Сара Шпитальник. Бессарабский стиль. Кишинёв: Ruxandra, 2005.
