= Malnik =

Malnik may refer to:

- Alvin Ira Malnik (*1933); businessman, entrepreneur, attorney and philanthropist
- Lilly Appelbaum Malnik (*1929); Belgian Holocaust survivor
- Miriam Malnik-Ezagui; American nurse and TikToker
- a variety of wine grape; see Furmint
