= Pártos =

Pártos may refer to:

- Emeric Partos (1905-1975), Hungarian-born American fashion designer and furrier
- Frank Partos (1901–1956), American screenwriter
- Gyula Pártos, born Puntzman (1845–1916), Hungarian architect
- Ödön Pártos (1907–1977), Hungarian-Israeli violist, composer
- Partoş (Hungarian: Partos), a village in Banloc Commune, Timiș County, Romania
