= International Nehama Lifshitz Vocal Competition =

Annual competition in Vilnius, Lithuania

- Awarded for: Singing
- Sponsored by: Ministry of Culture (Lithuania), City of Vilnius Council, Estate of Nechama Lifshitz, Good Will Foundation, Matter of Color
- Location: Vilnius
- Country: Lithuania
- Presented by: Lithuanian Public Institution "Pro partners" (VšĮ "Pro partners")
- Rewards: Cash prizes; laureates' concerts and engagements
- First award: 2021; 5 years ago
- Website: www.competition.lt/en/home/
- Related: Nechama Lifshitz

The International Nehama Lifshitz Vocal Competition (Lithuanian: Tarptautinis Nechamos Lifšicaitės vokalistų konkursas) is an annual competition for classical singers held in Vilnius, Lithuania. Established in 2021 to honour the Lithuanian-Jewish soprano Nechama Lifshitz, the event promotes Jewish music alongside classical vocal performance and attracts singers from Lithuania and abroad.

== History ==
The first edition took place in Vilnius on 26–27 September 2021; subsequent editions have occurred annually, expanding in scope and international participation.

By 2024, the competition was described as its fourth edition and was staged in Vilnius from 27–30 October, with entrants selected via a preliminary round and public events in the city’s music venues.

== Organisation ==
The competition commemorates Nehama (Nechama) Lifshitz (1927–2017), a celebrated soprano from Kaunas whose career helped preserve Jewish culture in the Soviet era.

The competition is funded by The Lithuanian Council for Culture (Lietuvos kultūros taryba) under the Ministry of Culture (Lithuania), the City of Vilnius Council, the Estate of Nechama Lifshitz, the Good Will Foundation (Lithuanian Jewish Heritage Fund), Matter of Color, and organised by the public institution Pro partners.

== Format ==
The main event is the competition for adult classical singers (generally ages 21–35); which consists of three rounds. There is also a standalone Yiddish song competition, as well as specific children/youth competitions (with age bands announced in each edition).

The competition takes place in a variety of theatres, including the Town Hall, Vilnius and the Great Hall of the Lithuanian Academy of Music and Theatre (LMTA). The final round is usually accompanied by The Vilnius City Municipality St. Christopher Chamber Orchestra.

== Prizes and engagements ==
Finalists and laureates receive diplomas and cash prizes; some editions have also offered laureates’ concerts in Vilnius and abroad (including Tel Aviv and Paris). Past laureates have gone on to work as principal soloists at leading opera houses, including the Lithuanian National Opera and the Israeli Opera.

== See also ==
- BBC Cardiff Singer of the World competition
- International Vocal Competition 's-Hertogenbosch
- Jewish music
- Yiddish theatre
