= Ödön Pártos =

Hungarian-Israeli violist and composer (1907-1977)

- עֵדֶן פרטוש
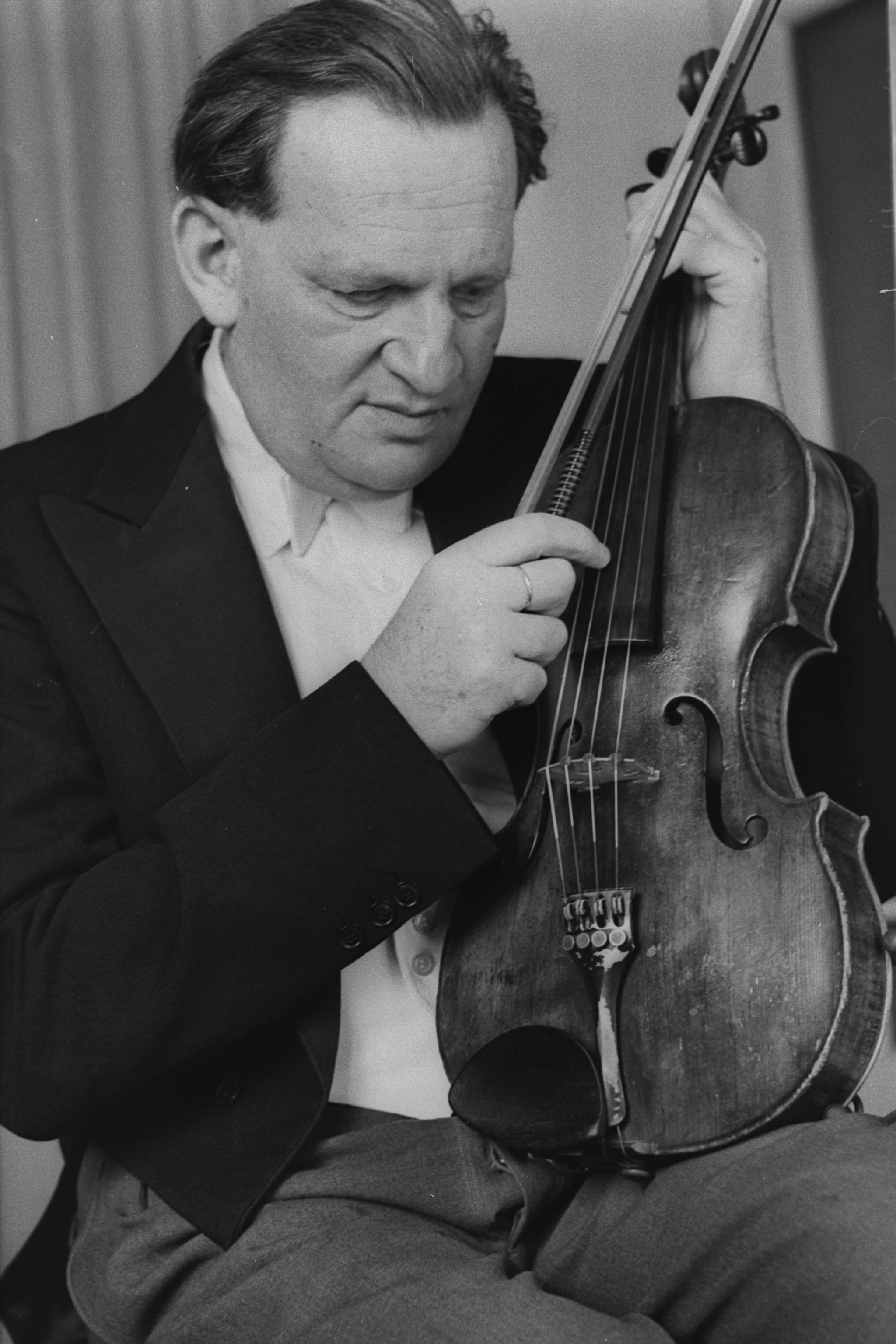
- Ödön Pártos
- Born: October 1, 1907; Budapest, Austria-Hungary
- Died: July 6, 1977 (aged 69); Tel Aviv, Israel
- Occupations: Violist; Composer
- Known for: Principal violist of the Israel Philharmonic Orchestra
- Awards: Israel Prize (1954)

Ödön Pártos [alternate transcription in English: Oedoen Partos, Hungarian: Pártos Ödön, Hebrew: עֵדֶן פרטוש (Eden Partosh)] (1 October 1907 in Budapest – 6 July 1977 in Tel Aviv) was a Hungarian-Israeli violist and composer. A recipient of the Israel Prize, he taught and served as director of the Rubin Academy of Music, now known as the Buchmann-Mehta School of Music in Tel Aviv.

== Biography ==
Partos was born in Budapest (at that time, part of the Austro-Hungarian Empire) and studied at the Franz Liszt Academy of Music, together with Antal Doráti and Mátyás Seiber, studied the violin with Jenő Hubay and composition with Zoltán Kodály. Upon completing his studies, he was accepted to the position of Principal Violinist in an orchestra in Lucerne, after which he played in other European orchestras, among them, in Berlin. In 1934, following Hitler’s ascendance to power, Partos returned to his birthplace, Budapest, where he was Principal Violinist in the city's symphony orchestra.

In 1936, Bronisław Huberman founded the Palestine Orchestra (now: Israel Philharmonic Orchestra), for which he recruited Jewish musicians cast out of Europe's orchestras. Huberman sought to include Partos, though the latter's take-up of the post was delayed due to a prior commitment – a contract with the government of the USSR through which Partos taught violin and composition in the Conservatory of Baku, Azerbaijan. In 1937, Partos left the USSR, after having refused to join the Communist Party during the period of the Moscow Trials. He returned to Budapest, where he served as the orchestra's Principal Violinist along with making concert tours of European countries.
At that time, Bronisław Huberman invited Partos to a meeting in Florence, where he offered him the position of Principal Violist in the Palestine Orchestra. Declining attractive offers from South America (notably, Peru), Partos immigrated to British Mandatory Palestine in 1938.

Between the years 1938–1956, Partos was the principal of the Israel Philharmonic Orchestra's viola section, as well as playing numerous solo performances in Israel and abroad. In 1946, together with cellist László Vincze, he founded the Samuel Rubin Israel Academy of Music (now: Buchmann-Mehta School of Music) in Tel Aviv, and in 1959 was instrumental in founding the Thelma Yellin High School of Art in Tel Aviv. In 1951, Partos was appointed director of the Rubin Academy, a position he was to hold until his death (although the state of his health during his last five years of life prevented him from taking an active part in the academy's administration, a position filled by Prof. Arie Vardi who succeeded him as director there).

Ödön Partos is regarded as among the most important Israeli composers. He was awarded the Israel Prize in 1954, the first honoree in the field of music. Together with his colleagues Alexander Uriah Boskovich and Mordecai Seter (both of whom taught at the Samuel Rubin Israel Academy of Music, which Partos directed), he was regarded as part of the Troika—a 'triumvirate' of composers who shared a belief that Israeli music should reflect local musical and cultural influences. He expressed this view, inter alia, in his 1956 article "My Path in Music".

Among the notable students of Partos: Cecylia Arzewski, Dvora Bartonov, Menahem Breuer, Ilan Gronich, Rami Solomonow, Rivka Golani, Uri Mayer, Rami Bar-Niv, Yehoshua Lakner , Avraham Sternklar, Shelemyahu Zacks, and Noa Blass .

== Awards ==
- In 1954, Partos was awarded the Israel Prize, for Music.

== General references ==
- Lyman, Darryl. Great Jews in Music, J. D. Publishers, 1986.
- Tischler, Alice. A descriptive bibliography of art music by Israeli composers, Harmonie Park Press, 1988.
- Weingarten, Elmar; Traber, Habakuk. Verdrängte Musik. Berliner Komponisten im Exil, Argon Verlag, 1987.
- Seter, Ronit. "Oedoen Partos". In "Israeli Art Music", Oxford Bibliographies Online. https://www.oxfordbibliographies.com/display/document/obo-9780199757824/obo-9780199757824-0264.xml#obo-9780199757824-0264-div2-0016 (accessed 21 Nov. 2023)

== See also ==
- List of Israel Prize recipients
- List of Hungarian Jews
- Pártos
