= Leibu Levin =

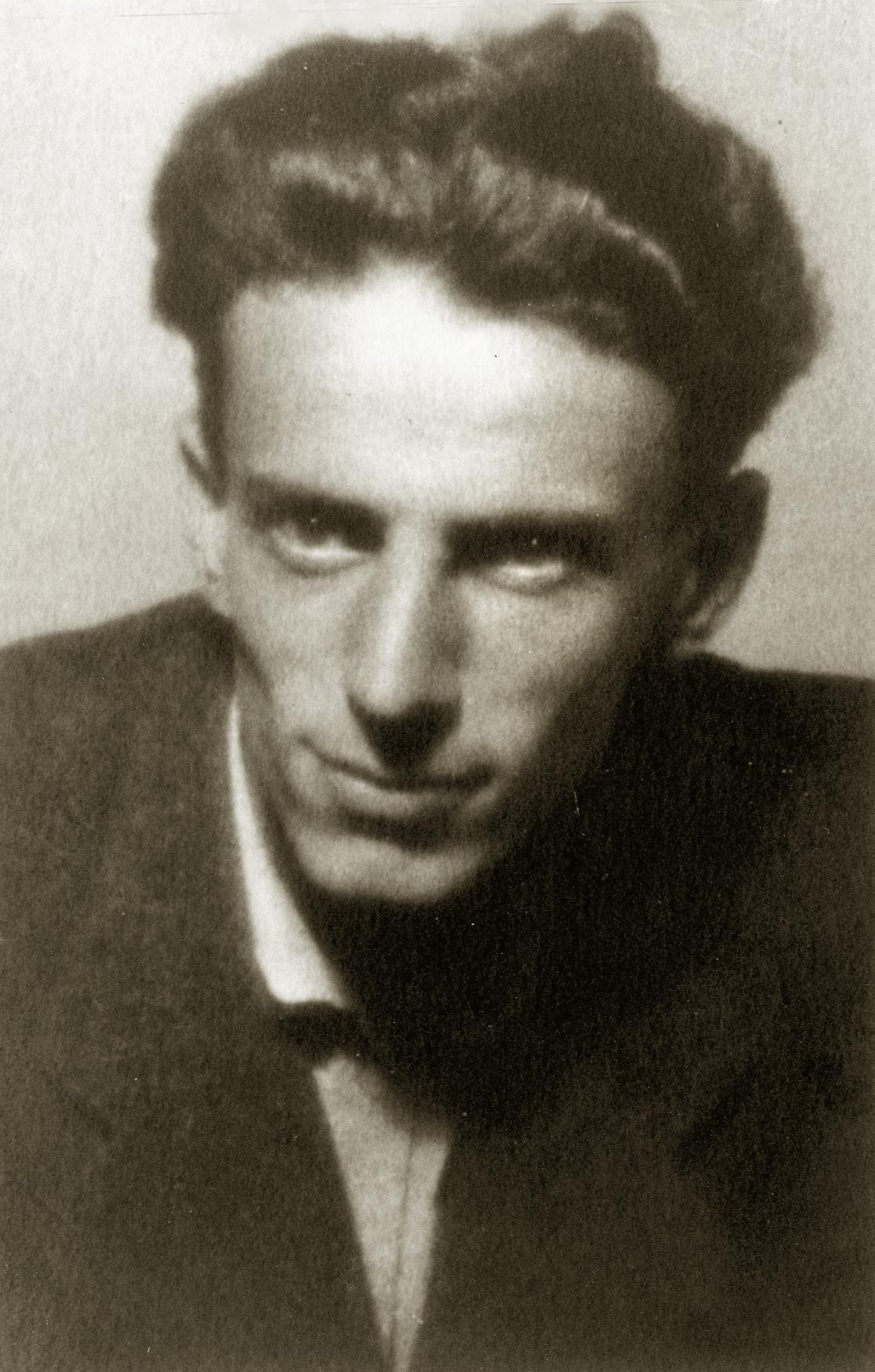

Background information
- Born: 1914; Câmpulung Moldovenesc, Duchy of Bukovina, Austria-Hungary
- Died: 1983 Herzliya, Israel
- Genres: Yiddish Singer, Spoken word artist, Lieds,
- Occupations: Spoken word artist, singer, composer
- Years active: 1933–1982

Leibu Levin (1914 in Câmpulung Moldovenesc, Duchy of Bukovina, Austria-Hungary – 1983 in Herzliya, Israel) was a narrator of Yiddish literature, singer and composer who wrote in Yiddish. During his last years, he emigrated to Israel.

Levin was born in the town of Campulung in 1914. In 1919 he moved to Czernowitz. He studied Yiddish language and literature in the Seminar of the "Yiddisher Shul-Farayn" and at the same time appeared with recitals of Yiddish prose and poetry, often singing his own melodies. Levin's first recitals were warmly acclaimed by the linguist and philologist Dr. Haim Gininger. In a long article, published in the literary magazine "Di Vokh" on January 31, 1935, he wrote: "Leibu Levin showed himself to be an excellent interpreter of Yiddish poetry... Levin is perhaps the first interpreter of Manger. Never before have we been so intoxicated by the specific Manger landscape and its fragrance as when Levin recited Manger's ballades..."

In 1939 in Czernowitz, Hersh Segal published the little album "Zeks Shloflider" ("Six lullabies"), with Levin's melodies to poems by I. Manger, H. Leivick, M.-L. Halpern, A. Reisen and N. Yud, and with Isiu Scharf's illustrations. One of those songs, M.-L. Halpern's “Az du vest batsoln, bruder...”, crossed the ocean to become a folksong even during the composer's lifetime.

Leibu Levin gave innumerable recitals in Czernowitz, and all the larger and smaller towns in . He was a real troubadour of the Yiddish literature. He was reciting the fables of Elieser Steinbarg even before they were published. In Bălți he met the folk ballad composer and singer Zelig Bardichever and was the first one to perform his songs on stage. The scores in the book "Zelik Barditshever. Lider Mit Nigunim", published by Hersh Segal in Czernowitz, 1939, were written down following Leibu Levin's singing and interpretation.

When in 1941, the war started between Nazi Germany and the Soviet Union, Levin was called up and later sent to a labor camp in the Urals. In 1942 he was arrested and sentenced without trial to fifteen years imprisonment. Not until 1956 was he discharged and "rehabilitated". He performed for six more years, -- three of them together with Nechama Lifshitz, -- but then had to leave the stage, because his health had been severely undermined during the time he spent in prison camps.

However, he continued to set Yiddish poetry to music. In 1972 he immigrated to Israel. Here he set to music, among others, six poems in Hebrew. A few recordings of him singing his songs have been made by Kol Israel in the seventies. He also translated from German into Yiddish all the poems of the Czernowitz poet Selma Meerbaum-Eisinger, who died in a Nazi-camp at the age of 18, and set six of her poems to music. His last concert in 1982, was also recorded by Kol Israel.

Leibu Levin died in 1983, at the age of 69. He left about 80 melodies to the finest lyrics of Yiddish poetry. The songs to texts by Hebrew poets, with Hanan Winternitz's piano arrangements, were published in 1990 in the Nisimov Music Library in Tel Aviv. An anthology of 49 songs to Yiddish poetry, with piano arrangements by H. Winternitz, has been published in 2006 in "I. L. Peretz Publications", Tel-Aviv. The anthology contains 49 songs to poems by 21 Yiddish poets (I. Manger, H. Leivick, A. Reisen, H. N. Bialik, M.-L. Halpern and others), photos and drawings. Ruth Levin, the composer's daughter and renowned singer, provides a preface and an epilogue. All the texts are in Yiddish, English and Hebrew.
