= Zinovy Shulman =

Zinovy Shulman (Russian: Зиновий Борухович Шульман Zinoviy Borukhovich Shul'man Yiddish: זינאָווי שולמאַן 1904–1977), was a Soviet Jewish singer (tenor) known for singing Yiddish art songs. He was the son of the cantor Borukh Leib Shulman (1870-1963) and was great-grandson of the writer Kalman Schulman (1819-1899). He was one of the most popular Yiddish singers in the Soviet Union alongside some of his contemporaries such as Mikhail Alexandrovich, Emil Gorovets, Anna Guzik, and Sidi Tal.

== Early life ==
Shulman was born on October 28, 1904, in Odesa, Russian Empire. His father, the cantor Borukh Shulman, had six children; he was also a tenor and was said to have been Zinovy's first teacher. By age ten Zinovy was already a talented singer and was a soloist in his father's synagogue choir. The family's life was severely disrupted by the 1917 Russian Revolution; the Odessa Synagogue where his father was cantor was burned down, and thereafter the family moved around so that Borukh could continue singing. After graduating from the Odessa Gymnasium, Zinovy studied under the tenor Viktor Selyavin. Shulman's first performances were in the mid 1920s. His earliest concerts consisted of Yiddish songs, arias, and romances. In 1929 the Odessa Department of Education sent him to Moscow to audition for the People's Commisariat of Education; they were so impressed by the arias he performed that they initially planned to send him to Italy to study, although this plan was not successful. Thereafter he studied at the State Institute of Theater Arts, from which he graduated in 1934. His teacher there was the tenor Roman Isidorovich Charov.

== Musical career ==
In 1934–35 he was made soloist of the K. Stanislavsky Opera House (now the K. Stanislavsky and V. Nemirovich-Danchenko Musical Theater). However, he remained more interested in Yiddish art song than Opera, and resigned in 1935 to dedicate himself more fully to Jewish music. He was known for arranging traditional Yiddish folksongs, translating well-known arias into Yiddish, and for soliciting Yiddish writers and composers to create new works for him to perform. He continued to perform during the 1930s and 1940s and in 1948 famously performed for Golda Meir, future Israeli Prime Minister, who was then the Israeli ambassador to the USSR.

== Arrest and detention ==
In 1949, after a concert in Kislovodsk, he was arrested. His arrest was part of a broader shift in Soviet official policy towards Yiddish culture which saw a near-complete disappearance of Yiddish and Jewish culture from the stage and airwaves. After the concert he was sent by Kyiv where he was interrogated, tortured, and accused of support for Jewish nationalism; he was eventually sentenced to ten years in a labor camp. He was sent to the Karlag (Karaganda Corrective Labor Camp in the Kazakh SSR) where his hand was permanently injured from the difficult manual labor.

== Second phase of career ==
In the mid-1950s, following the death of Stalin, Soviet policy towards Yiddish was revised and a period of revival of Yiddish entertainment began. Shulman was rehabilitated in 1956 or 1957, and he returned to Moscow and resumed performing. However, despite official support and large audiences, Shulman and other Yiddish singers such as Anna Guzik were encouraged to incorporate more and more Russian language material in their performances and even occasionally asked not to perform in Yiddish at certain events. This period also saw the return to print of some Yiddish literature and, after 1961, the publication of a literary journal Sovetish Heymland which promoted Shulman and other Yiddish artists. One such promotional material, which was distributed widely in 1961, described a "conference devoted to the development of Yiddish songs and music, organized by the Soviet-Yiddish magazine SOVETISH KHEYMLAND. [...] Nehama Lifshits, Eddie Thal, Emil Horovits, Mihail Alexandrovich, Anna Guzik, and Zinoviy Shulman have in the past few months given concerts of Yiddish songs in some of the best concert halls of Moscow." After 1963 he appeared regularly with Shvartser's Moscow Yiddish Drama Ensemble.

Some records were released of his songs in the late 1930s and 1940s under the labels Gramplasttrest and V.S.G. (ВСГ), the greatest number were released in the 1960s and 1970s on the Melodiya label. In his late career, as his health worsened Shulman also turned to educating a younger generation of performers. In 1973 a collection of his repertoire was published under the title Jewish songs from the repertoire of Zinovy Shulman (Russian: Еврейские песни из репертуара Зиновия Шульмана).

Shulman continued his good relations with Golda Meir and the Israeli Embassy in Moscow; he held regular performances there, and in 1969 when Shulman became seriously ill, and Golda Meir attempted to send him medicines, although they did not reach him. Shulman died in Moscow in 1977 and was posthumously awarded the title of Prisoner of Zion by Israel in 1997.
