= Betty Yokova =

Czech-born French-American fashion designer

Betty Yokova (1901 – 24 April 1995) was a Czech-born French fashion designer who became an award-winning American fur designer in New York.

== Biography ==
Betty Yokova was born in Prague, Bohemia in 1901, and studied art in Paris. She began her fashion career in Paris in the 1930s, opening her own couture house despite not having had any training or apprenticeships with other fashion houses. At the outbreak of World War II, Yokova closed her establishment.

In 1948 Yokova moved to New York and joined Anna Potok as a designer for Potok and her brother's fur house, Maximilian. She and Potok worked together on the designs, and were credited as co-designers. Apart from a brief interlude in the early 1960s where she worked at Bernham Stein, she worked for Maximilian until 1963, when she left to design for another furrier, A. Neustadter & Sons. In 1963, she was presented with a Coty Award for her fur designs at Neustadter. In 1964, Yokova described her approach to design as seeing the pelts as fabrics, and being inspired by their textures and colors.

She retired in 1967, and died on 24 April 1995, at the Eastern Long Island Hospital in Greenport. She was survived by her sister.
