= Cecylia Arzewski =

Polish violinist

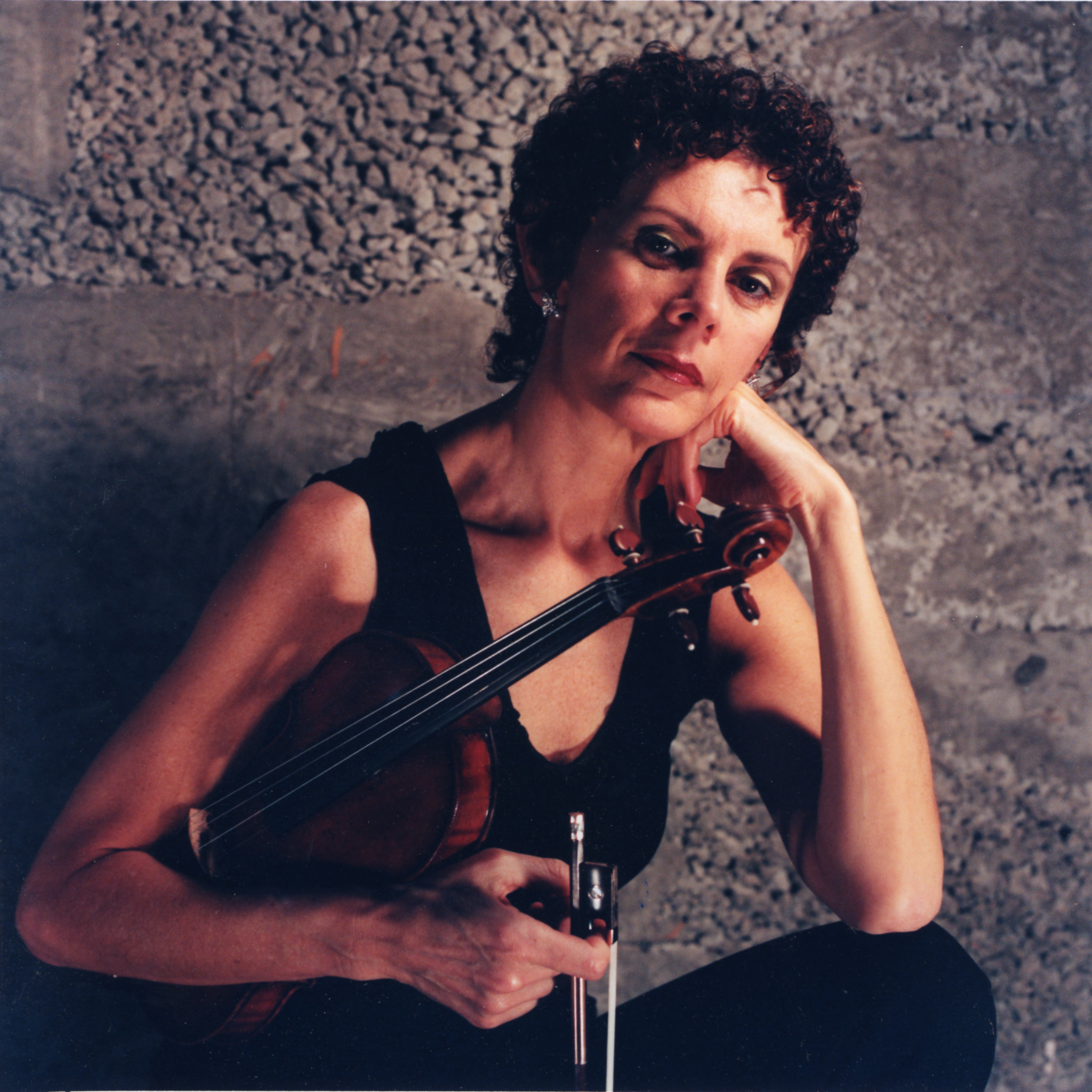
- Born: March 31, 1948 (age 78); Kraków, Poland
- Education: Tel Aviv Conservatory, Juilliard, Meadowmount, and the New England Conservatory of Music
- Occupation: Musician
- Family: Bronislawa Arzewski, Stanislaw Arzewski, Michael Arzewski, and Josef Arzewski
- Website: Cecylia Arzewski's Youtube Channel

Cecylia Arzewski (born March 31, 1948) is a Polish violinist.

== Early life and education ==
Cecylia Arzewski was born to Polish-Jewish parents in Kraków, Poland. Both of her parents, Bronislawa and Stanislaw Arzewski, and her brother Michael Arzewski (born 1938) were Holocaust survivors. Arzewski and her brother Michael (a pianist) both received the American-Israeli cultural foundation scholarship in 1957. Michael Arzewski went on to study at the Juilliard School with Eduard Steuermann and Mieczyslaw Munz.

Her father Stanislaw Arzewski was a pianist as well as a major musical influence on his daughter. He came from a large musical family in Warsaw. His father Josef Arzewski was a concertmaster in Warsaw prior to WW2. According to Stanislaw Arzewski, there never was a shortage of perfect pitch in the family, which Cecylia Arzewski inherited.

She began her violin studies with E. Kawalla at the age of five. After moving to Israel, she studied at the Tel Aviv Conservatory with Odeon Partos. In 1960 when the family moved to the US, she studied with Ivan Galamian at the Juilliard School of Music. In 1967 Arzewski moved to Boston, MA and studied at the New England Conservatory with Joseph Silverstein, who became her mentor. She studied with Joseph Silverstein until 1975. She also coached with Josef Gingold, Paul Makanowitzky and Jascha Heifetz.

== Career ==
In 1969, Arzewski played with the Buffalo Philharmonic Orchestra as a principal 2nd violinist. Five months later, she auditioned for the Boston Symphony and became a member of the 2nd violin section working with William Steinberg. When she joined the Boston Symphony in 1970, she became the youngest tenured violinist in the history of the orchestra. In 1978, she rose to the position of assistant concertmaster and continued her work with Seiji Ozawa.

In 1987, Arzewski joined the Cleveland Orchestra as associate concertmaster, working with music director Christoph von Dohnányi. She served as the Atlanta Symphony Orchestra's concertmaster from 1990 to 2008, working with Music Directors Yoel Levi and Robert Spano. By assuming this position, she became the first female concertmaster of a major American orchestra. Over the course of her distinguished orchestral career, prior to arriving in Atlanta, Arzewski performed under the batons of William Steinberg, Eric Leinsdorf, Eugene Ormandy, Leonard Bernstein, Kurt Masur, Bernard Haitink, Claudio Abbado, Sir Colin Davis, Sir Simon Rattle, Christoph von Dohnanyi, Yoel Levi, Lorin Mazel, and James Levine.

Arzewski owned and played for the bulk of her career a violin by Pietro Guarnerius of Mantua, 1714, titled "Geza de Kresz, ex Caressa".

After stepping down from her position as the Atlanta Symphony Orchestra Concertmaster, Arzewski became the artistic director for the 2008 and 2009 North Georgia Music Festivals. In 2019, Arzewski authored the book "Gustav's Gate" for a young audience between the ages of 7 and 12. This story features a dog named Gustav, found sick in the Chattahoochee National Forest. It aims to encourage a love of the arts in children.

=== Solo concerto appearances ===
Her concerto appearances with the Atlanta Symphony Orchestra featured the following pieces: Wieniawski Concerto Op. 22 No. 2 in D minor, Mendelssohn Concerto Op. 64 in E minor, Berg Violin Concerto, Bach Double Violin Concerto BVW 1043 (with Iona Brown performing and conducting), Conus Violin Concerto, Mozart Concerto in D Major K. 218, Bartok Violin Concerto, Mozart Symphonie Concertante in E Flat Major K 365 (with Pinchas Zukerman performing and conducting), Bach Double Violin Concerto BVW 1043 (with Joseph Silverstein performing and conducting), Beethoven Triple Concerto Op. 56, Beethoven Concerto Op. 61 in D Major, Stravinsky Violin Concerto, Brahms Violin Concerto, Earl Kim Violin Concerto, Brahms Double with Sarah Santabrogio, Hartmann, Violin Concerto, and Prokofiev Violin Concerto #2 Op. 63.

She made a concerto appearance with the Cleveland Orchestra in the playing of Conus, Violin Concerto. Her concerto appearances with the Boston Pops included Wieniawski, Concerto Op. 22, No 2 in D minor Mozart, Conus Violin Concerto, Mendelssohn Concerto Op. 64 in E minor, Mozart Concerto for Violin No. 4 in D major K. 218, and Camille Saint-Saëns Carnival of the Animals. She made her recital debut at Carnegie Hall. She made other Carnegie Hall concerto appearances for Bach Sonatas for Unaccompanied Violin and the Three Concertmasters Concert.

=== Chamber music appearances ===
Arzewski has performed in Boston, New York City, Cleveland, Atlanta, and Lieges Paris with artists such as Pinchas Zukerman, Emanuel Ax, Andrew Watts, Joseph Silverstein, Philippe Entremont, Iona Brown, and Lois Shapiro.

== Awards and honors ==
In 1978, Arzewski was an award winner at the Twentieth Bach International Competition at Merriweather Post Pavilion in Columbia, M.D. Following this accomplishment, she performed an unaccompanied Bach solo recital at Carnegie Hall. Since her 1978 success, Arzewski has become involved with the International Bach Competition as a member of the 2014 and 2018 competition juries. Arzewski has also appeared as a soloist with the Cleveland Orchestra and the Boston Pops. She toured Europe on two occasions playing the Mozart D major and Stravinsky violin concertos. Arzewski has also performed chamber music with artists such as Emanuel Ax and André Watts.

== Discography ==
=== Solo recordings ===
- Kim Violin Concerto with William Wolfram, Robert Kim, and the National Symphony Orchestra of Ireland
- BACH: Sonatas and Partitas for Solo Violin BWV 1001-1006 (BRIDGE: BRIDGE9358A-B 2CD mid-price)

=== Orchestral recording with concertmaster solo ===
- Rimsky-Korsakov, Scheherazade
- Mahler, Symphonies #2, 4, 5, 8, 10
- Stravinsky, Pulcinella
- Shostakovich, Symphony #10
- Gustav Holst, The Planets
- Ravel, Daphne and Chloe
- Schoenberg, Verklarte Nach, Pellease und Melissande
- Vaughan Williams, Sea Symphony
- Stravinsky, Rite of Spring
- Beethoven, Overtures
- Rossini, Overtures
- Mussorgsky, Pictures at an Exhibition
- Prokofiev, Symphonies #1 and #5
- Simbelius, Symphonies #1, 2, 5
- Haydn Creation
- Hindemith, Mathis der Maler
- Mendellsohn, Symphony #4 and Midsummer Night's Dream
- Brahms, Serenade #1 and Variations on a Theme by Haydn
- Dvorak, Slavonic Dances
- Barber CD with Sylvia McNair
- CD with Andre Watts – Saint-Saens and Tchaikovsky Piano Concertos
