= Applebaum =

Applebaum is a Jewish surname. It may refer to:

- Anne Applebaum (born 1964), journalist and author
- Cicely Applebaum Ryshpan (1904–2004), American economist
- Chris Applebaum (born 1970), American music video director
- Dallin Applebaum, American songwriter, pianist, vocalist and music producer
- David Applebaum (1952–2003), Israeli doctor and terrorist victim
  - Nava Applebaum (c. 1983–2003), David's daughter and terrorist victim
- Edward Applebaum (1937–2020), American composer
- Elisha Applebaum (born 1995), English actress
- Jacob Appelbaum (born 1983), American hacker, Core Tor member
- Jon Applebaum (born 1985), American politician
- Leah Applebaum, American voice actress
- Louis Applebaum (1918–2000), Canadian composer and conductor
- Mark Applebaum, American composer and music professor
- Michael Applebaum (born 1963), Canadian politician and former Mayor of Montreal
- Sid Applebaum (1924–2016), American grocery magnate
- Stan Applebaum (1922–2019), American musician, orchestrator and arranger

== Fictional characters ==
- "Bonita Applebum", American popular song

== See also ==
- Appelbaum
- Apfelbaum
