= Mikhail Epelbaum =

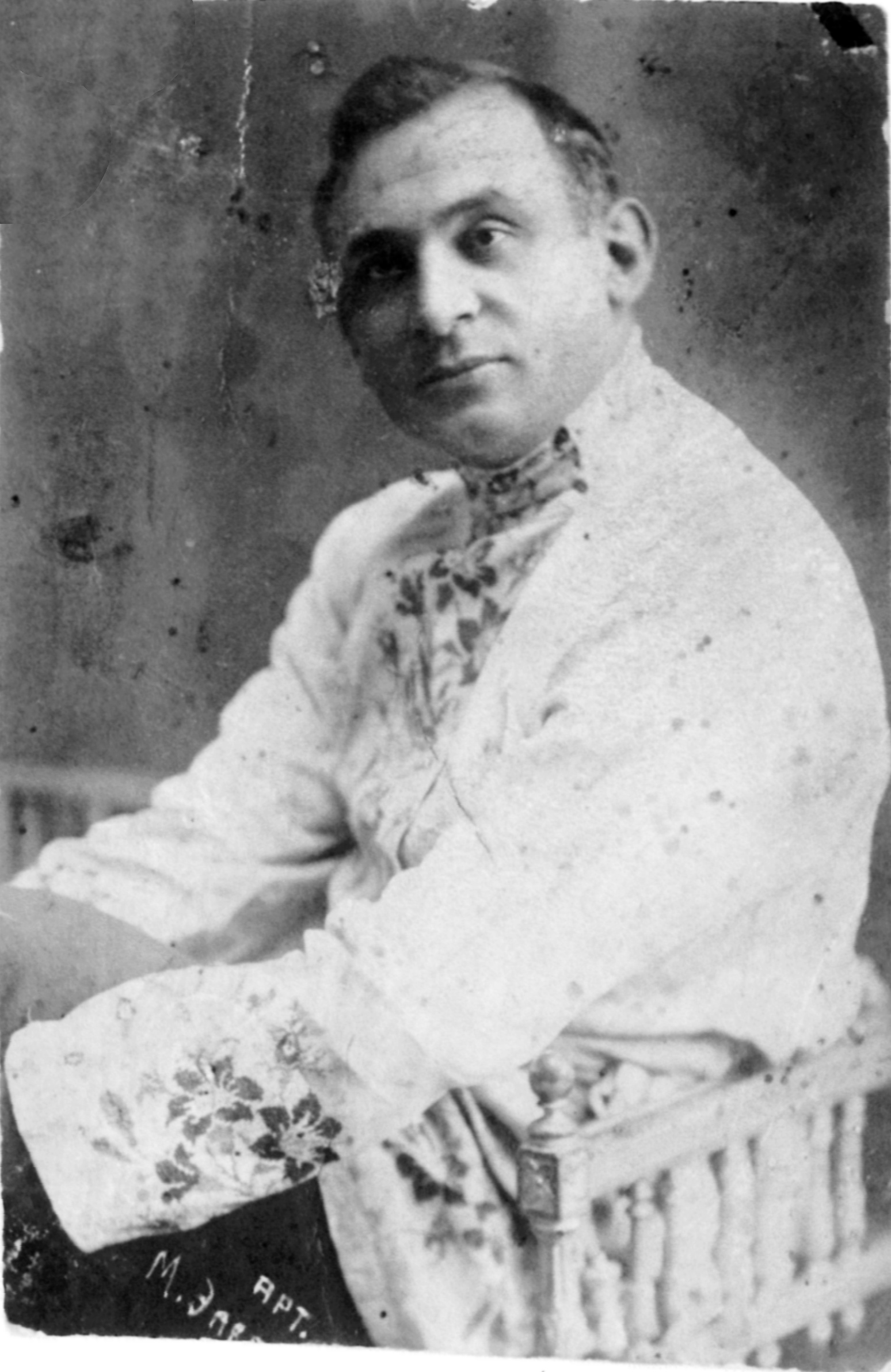
A portrait of Mikhail Epelbaum (Михаил Иосифович Эпельбаум), Yiddish and Russian singer

Mikhail Epelbaum (Russian: Михаил Иосифович Эпельбаум Mikhail Iosifovich Epel'baum, Yiddish: מיכאל עפּעלבױם Mikhl Epelboym, 1894-1957) was a well-known Yiddish baritone singer from Russia and the Soviet Union during the first half of the twentieth century. In 1937 he was appointed a Merited Artist of the Russian Federation.

== Biography ==
=== Early life ===
Epelbaum's birthplace is disputed; according to Soviet sources he was born in 1894 in Odessa, whereas the Leksikon fun yidishn teater states instead that he was born in Brest-Litovsk and moved to Odessa at age 11. Most biographies agree that he was born into a family of tailors, but the same Leksikon reports that in Odessa his parents opened a tailoring equipment shop. After studying in a Cheder, Epelbaum studied in a private Gymnasium in Odessa.

=== Music and theatre career ===
In 1910, at age sixteen, Epelbaum started performing in numerous Yiddish theatre wandering troupes, predominantly Operetta: Meyer Mishurat's, Ilya Korik's and A. Weinstein's in 1910 and 1912, Moisey Genfer's in 1911, Lazar Rappel's in 1913 and 1915–16, A. Fishzon's in 1914–15, N. Lipovsky's in 1916–17 and many others. During his early years in theatre he met Roza Weinstein, a fellow actor, whom he would later marry. Because of his well-documented performance schedule during these years, the claims that he studied at the Warsaw Institute of Music, had a successful career in Russian opera or took part in the 1911 An-Sky Expedition, which were repeated in Russian-language Jewish encyclopedias and some other editions, seem to be fabricated.

During the First World War, he apparently enlisted as a soldier but was wounded in combat, and was released from service and immediately returned to acting in Yiddish troupes in Ukraine.

During the Russian Civil War he started touring with a solo singing programme of Yiddish songs. He seems to have narrowly escaped a Pogrom by supporters of Nykyfor Hryhoriv in Cherkasy in 1919. His popularity as a singer grew, and he had very successful performances in Moscow and Petrograd in 1922 and 1923. In the mid-1920s, he also occasionally performed in some Russian language operettas.

During the period of 1926 to 1929, Epelbaum left the Soviet Union for an extended period to tour in a number of countries in Europe and the Americas. He spent several months performing in Argentina as well as a short time in New York. He made his first recording during this time as well (with Columbia Records in 1927). After he finished that round of tours, he returned to the USSR, first to Kiev, then moved to Leningrad. During the 1930s he successfully toured with concert programs of Yiddish folk songs throughout the Soviet Union. In 1937 he was named Merited Artist of the Russian Federation. As with Zinovy Shulman and other Soviet Yiddish singers, the Jewish content of his material was highly censored.

It was in the 1930s that he recorded the majority of his 78 rpm discs for Soviet record labels such as SovSong, Gramplasttrest, Leningrad LRK and Muztrest, consisting of Yiddish folk or theatrical songs. During the Second World War, Epelbaum was evacuated to Siberia, but continued to give concerts, mostly in Russian, in various Soviet cities as well as in frontline hospitals. During the war period, he also starred in the feature film The Invasion (1945) as a Nazi officer.

After the war ended, he returned to Leningrad and also resumed his Yiddish concert performances all over the USSR.

=== Arrest and deportation ===
In 1949, in the midst of a crackdown on Jewish culture in the Soviet Union, Epelbaum was arrested and sentenced to 10 years in labour camps.

=== Release and final years ===
A year after Stalin's death, in 1954, Epelbaum was released from labour camps and returned to Leningrad. Officially, this was done "for medical reasons." He was rehabilitated in late 1956 only. But already since March 1955 he resumed his concert schedule on a permanent basis and until the end of his days toured widely throughout the USSR with concerts of Yiddish songs, returning joy and hope to the intimidated Jewish population of the country. Epelbaum died of Cancer in Leningrad on 15 April 1957.
