= Sidi Tal =

Singer and actress (1912–1983)

Sidy Tal
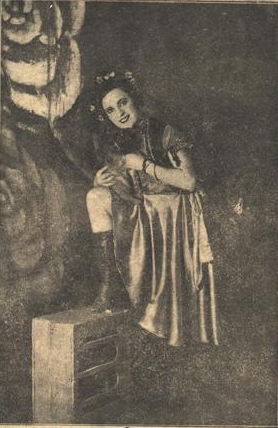

Background information
- Born: Sorele L'vovna Birkental; 8 September 1912
- Origin: Chernowitz, Bukovina, then Austria-Hungary, modern-day Chernivtsi, Ukraine
- Died: 17 August 1983 (aged 70)
- Occupations: Yiddish singer, actress

Sidi L'vovna Tal' (Russian: Сиди Львовна Таль) or Sidy Thal (born Yiddish: Sorele Birkental (Сореле Биркенталь) on 8 September 1912 – died 17 August 1983) was a Jewish singer and actress in the Yiddish language, born in Czernowitz, Austria-Hungary (now Chernivtsi, Ukraine). She worked in Romania and in the USSR. She and her husband, Pinkus Falik (producer of Gery Scott), encouraged and helped the start of the career of the Ukrainian pop singer Sofia Rotaru. Sidy Tal worked at the Chernivtsi Philharmonic until the late 1970s, singing and performing comical, dramatic, and satiric scenes, monologues, and sketches. She also worked with young non-Jewish actors in the Philharmonic, teaching them movement and staging. Some of her students later became superstars of the Soviet popular stage. Throughout her career at the Philharmonic, Sidy Tal and her group toured all over the country and traveled to Hungary and Romania. Her repertoire included works of such Chernivtsi authors as Eliezer Steinbarg and Motl Saktsier. The music to some of the songs she sang was written by Chernivtsi composers Leibu Levin and Leonid Zatulovskiy.
