= Ian Appelbaum =

American physicist

- Education: Massachusetts Institute of Technology
- Scientific career
- Fields: Physicist
- Workplaces: University of Maryland

Ian Appelbaum is an American physicist, currently at the University of Maryland and an Elected Fellow of the American Physical Society. He is a graduate of Massachusetts Institute of Technology with a Ph.D. in physics.
