= Richard A. Appelbaum =

American Coast Guard admiral

Richard A. Appelbaum is a retired Rear Admiral in the United States Coast Guard.

== Biography ==
A native of Chicago, Illinois, Appelbaum moved to Miami, Florida in 1950. He is a graduate of the George Washington University Law School.

Appelbaum is married to Maureen Eddy Carr and has three children.

== Career ==
Appelbaum graduated from the United States Coast Guard Academy in 1961. His assignments included serving as Executive Officer of the USCGC Papaw (WLB-308) in Charleston, South Carolina, the USCGC Eagle (WIX-327) in New London, Connecticut and the USCGC Westwind (WAGB-281) in Milwaukee, Wisconsin before commanding the USCGC Vigorous (WMEC-627) in New London, Connecticut.

Eventually, he would be named Chief of Law Enforcement and Defense Operations.

Awards received include the Legion of Merit with award star, the Meritorious Service Medal and the Coast Guard Commendation Medal with three award stars.
