= Miriam Ezagui =

American TikToker and nurse

- Born: Miriam Malnik; 1986 (age 39–40)
- Occupations: Nurse; TikToker
- Spouse: Aron Ezagui
- Children: 5
- Relatives: Lilly Appelbaum Malnik (grandmother)

TikTok information
- Page: miriamezagui
- Followers: 2.4M
- Last updated: November 4, 2026
- Website: birthingwithmiriam.com

Miriam Malnik-Ezagui (born 1986) is an American nurse and TikToker known for making videos about her life and experiences as an Orthodox Jew living in New York City. Malnik-Ezagui is the granddaughter of Holocaust survivor Lilly Appelbaum Malnik.

== Early life and family ==
Miriam Malnik grew up in Maryland, in a traditional Jewish family; at age nine her family became Orthodox through Chabad.

Ezagui is the granddaughter of Lilly Appelbaum Malnik, a Belgian Holocaust survivor who was imprisoned at Auschwitz concentration camp for fourteen months. Her grandmother, who met the German Nazi doctor Josef Mengele three times while imprisoned, was liberated from the camp when she was sixteen years old by the British Army in 1945. Ezagui's grandfather, Abraham Malnik, was a Holocaust survivor from Lithuania who was sent to Kovno Ghetto, a Jewish ghetto, and was later imprisoned at Dachau concentration camp, Flossenbürg concentration camp, Leitmeritz concentration camp, and the Theresienstadt Ghetto. Ezagui's grandaunt, granduncle, great-grandmother, great-granduncle, and great-grandaunt were killed during the Holocaust.

== Career ==
Ezagui works as a labor and delivery nurse and runs her own business, Birthing With Miriam, a program that offers childbirth classes.

=== Social media ===
Ezagui has over 1.4 million followers on Instagram and 2.3 million followers on TikTok as of November 2025. She first began posting videos in May 2020. Her early content focused on babywearing, but in February 2022 she began to post about antisemitism and her Jewish identity following a comment made by Whoopi Goldberg the previous month that claimed the Holocaust wasn't racially motivated. Most of Ezagui's content focuses on educating people about Jewish culture, faith, history, and practices. These videos range from education on kosher laws and family purity laws to holiday preparations and celebrations.

Starting in April 2022 Ezagui began posting videos with her grandmother, who spoke about life during World War II and living in a concentration camp. One video with her grandmother received over 23 million views.

In September 2023, Ezagui was named as the Best Jewish TikToker by Jewish magazine Hey Alma.

In April 2024, Ezagui attended the March of the Living in Europe as part of a trip sponsored by TikTok. During the trip, she visited Auschwitz, where her grandmother had been imprisoned.

== Personal life ==
She is married to Aron Ezagui, a paramedic, and has five daughters. She and her family live in Brooklyn, New York City. They are Orthodox Jews who follow traditional religious practices including Taharas Hamishpacha, or laws of family purity. Though her husband is a Sephardic Jew, they follow Ashkenazi customs.
