= Anna Potok =

Polish-American fur designer

Anna Maximilian Potok (née Apfelbaum; 4 June 1897 – 22 April 1987) was a Polish-American fur designer and co-founder of Maximilian Furs.

== Biography ==
Potok was born Anna Apfelbaum on 4 June 1897 in Warsaw, Poland, the third generation of a family of furriers. After her father died when she was 19, she joined her brother Maximilian in the business in 1922. She married Leon Potok (d.1965), an engineer and stock market investor, on 7 July 1930, and they had one son, the author and disabled rights advocate Andrew Potok, born 1931. In 1934 she was awarded the Order of Polonia Restituta.

The Apfelbaums survived the 1903–06 pogroms due to their supplying furs to the highest levels of Polish society, including the President of Poland and the Mayor of Warsaw. Even after the Russian Revolution, they were safe because they supplied furs to Communist leaders who traveled there from Leningrad and Moscow. At first, following the 1939 partition of Poland between Russia and Nazi Germany, the Apfelbaums felt secure, as despite being known Jews, they were still allowed to travel freely about Europe for business. However, in 1940, they realised that they were in very real danger from the Final Solution, and were unable to escape Warsaw due to a lack of rail tickets. Anna and Maximilian eventually made it to Zurich, Switzerland, and then to Paris, just as it fell to the German occupation. The brother and sister decided to return to Warsaw to rescue the rest of the family, although they could only save her husband and son and Maximilian's daughter, whose mother had to stay behind, and was never seen again. Traveling in a single car with a single suitcase so as to look like normal travelers, they were almost apprehended at the Romanian border, but eventually made it into Lithuania and from there, sailed across the Baltic Sea to Sweden, where they obtained visas to the United States via Montreal with the assistance of the American Consulate in Stockholm.

On 29 August 1946, Potok became a naturalized American citizen. In 1953, Maxmilian (who had legally changed his name to Michael Maximilian after moving to the United States) died, and around this time, his sister assumed the middle name Maximilian as well as inheriting the business.

Potok died of heart failure at home in Manhattan, aged 89, on 22 April 1987.

== Maximilian ==
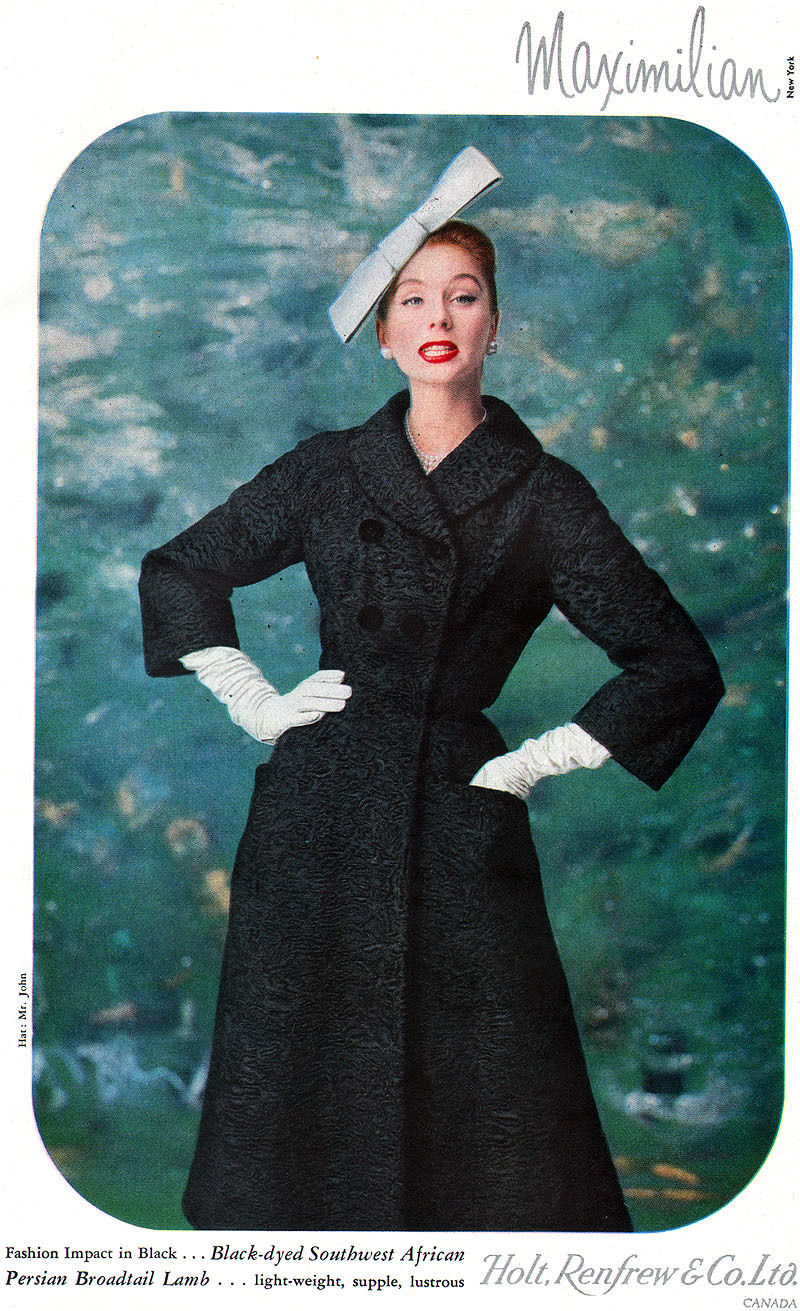
1955 broadtail coat by Maximilian Furs

After coming to the United States Potok and her brother opened their salon, and in 1942, relocated to West 57th Street, where a store is still located as of 2022. Maximilian expressed his distaste for the functional cold-weather furs for bureaucrats and their wives that had been their typical Polish output, and wanted to attract a more glamorous Hollywood clientele. His sister supported him in this, using her art training to design dramatic and eye-catching furs to draw in their ideal customers. Their first fashion shows attracted wealthy clients such as Marjorie Merriweather Post, Mrs. Loel Guinness, Thelma Chrysler Foy and Babe Paley. The choice of the name Maximilian for their renamed business, which suggested European imperial grandeur, helped the company appeal to its target customer base. Other customers included Helena Rubinstein, Diana Ross, Sophia Loren and the Duchess of Windsor, for whom Potok designed her first suit in Russian broadtail. Maximilian supplied furs to many First Ladies, including Lady Bird Johnson, Nancy Reagan, Jacqueline Kennedy Onassis, and Claude Pompidou of France.

Tailored suits made from fur like the one first made for the Duchess of Windsor became a Maximilian speciality and were considered their innovation, as were full-length evening fur coats and pieces combining more than one type of fur. Potok had a signature technique of treating sable fur to make it appear plumper and richer, and for using mink fur that had been brushed upwards to make it look like sable. Other innovations included furs dyed unusual colours, and mink coats made to resemble leopard or feathers. Maximilian received the Coty Award twice, the first time in 1948 as a special award that was also awarded to two other furriers, Joseph de Leo and Esther Dorothy; and the second time in 1965, when the special award was presented directly to Potok. In 1950, Maximilian decided to invite Emeric Partos of Dior, Paris, to do a guest collection for them. This resulted in Partos emigrating to New York, terminating his contract with Dior, and staying with Maximilian until 1955 when he was offered a job as head furrier for Bergdorf Goodman. Partos would himself receive the Coty for his fur designs in 1957. Other notable designers who worked for Maximilian included Betty Yokova between 1948 and 1963, and Karl Lagerfeld in the 1990s.

In 1972, Maximilian made the furs for a successful advertising campaign funded by the mink farmers American Legend Cooperative, titled "What Becomes a Legend Most?" and featuring celebrities in luxurious Blackglama-branded mink. Lauren Bacall, who was the first to pose, received her Blackglama coat as payment. That same year, Potok sold the Maximilian company to a London-based fur dealers, Arthur Bartfeld, although she stayed on as a consultant until late 1986. Many of her clients were the children or grandchildren of her original customers in Poland, and the quality of her furs was so high that customers would bring in 15-year old furs still in perfect condition. The quality of Maximilian continued after the sale, with a 1978 article for Routes describing the ongoing creativity, uniqueness and extravagance of Potok and Gilles Dufour's designs for the brand and the wide range of garments, from raincoats to ponchoes to short jackets. She was actively involved in designing for Maximilian well into her eighties, only retiring in January 1987, six months before her death.
