= Joseph Appelbaum =

Israeli professor of electrical engineering

- יוסף אפלבוים
- Born: 1936 (age 89–90); Siedlce, Poland
- Education: Technion
- Children: 3
- Awards: IEEE life fellow
- Scientific career
- Fields: Electrical engineering Solar energy
- Workplaces: Tel Aviv University
- Thesis: Design of Electrical Machines by Means of Digital Computers (1967)
- Doctoral advisor: Michael Erlicki

Joseph Appelbaum (Hebrew: יוסף אפלבוים; born 1936) is a professor (emeritus) in the Engineering Faculty at Tel Aviv University, and former holder of the Ludwig Jokel Chair of Electronics in the faculty. He is a life fellow of IEEE "for contributions to solar conversion systems".

== Early life and education ==
Joseph Appelbaum was born in Siedlce, Poland. He moved with his family to Israel in 1949. He studied at Bosmat Technical High School, and served in the IDF signal corps during the years 1955–1957.

Appelbaum received his B.Sc in Electrical Engineering in 1961 (Cum Laude) and M.Sc in Electrical Engineering (1963), both from the Technion, Haifa. His Ph.D. degree was received in 1967 from the Technion. Appelbaum authored the thesis Design of Electrical Machines by Means of Digital Computers, under the supervision of Michael Erlicki.

== Career ==
Appelbaum was an assistant professor at the University of Oklahoma in 1968. A year later he became a development project engineer at General Electric, U.S.A, before joining Tel Aviv University in 1972 as a senior lecturer at the Department of Electronic Communications, Control and Computer Systems. He was chair of the department in the years 1978–1980.

Appelbaum was promoted to an associate professor in 1979, and full professor in 1986. He retired as an emeritus professor in 2005. During the years, Appelbaum has supervised 43 graduate students and authored over 200 scientific publications.

During his career, Appelbaum held visiting academic positions at other universities and research institutes, including: NASA Lewis Research Center, Cleveland, Ohio, University of Colorado, Boulder Colorado, Queensland University of Technology, Brisbane, Australia, Universidad Publica de Navarra, Pamplona, Spain, Katholieke Universiteit, Leuven, Belgium.

Appelbaum was also a consultant for various companies in Israel, including Tadiran and Koor Metals.

== Research ==
Appelbaum's research work focuses on optimization methods for electromagnetic devices; electrical machines and drives; solar energy (radiation and systems); photovoltaic systems (terrestrial and space) and solar radiation on Mars.

Appelbaum has developed the solar radiation model which was first used in 1997 in the photovoltaic arrays for the Mars lander's Pathfinder, and for the two robotic rovers: Spirit and Opportunity. The solar radiation model was since then used for later missions to Mars. Appelbaum's Mars solar radiation equations have been implemented in the open-source R package marsrad.

== Awards ==
1988-1994	National Research Council (NRC), Senior Research Associate, NASA Lewis Research Center, Cleveland, Ohio, USA.
1995	IEEE life fellow
2000	The Jokel Chair of Electronics
2001	International Interuniversity Francqui Chair, Belgium
2006	Honorary Fellow – Society of Electrical and Electronic Engineers in Israel

== Publications ==
Book

- M. Crutchik, J. Appelbaum, Solar Radiation on a Catenary Collector, Paperback- October 18, 2018, NASA. ISBN 978-1728924212

Selected articles

- J. Appelbaum, M.S. Erlicki, "A Problem of Economic Optimization of Electric Equipment Design", IEEE Trans. on Communication and Electronics, Vol. 83, No. 75, pp. 773-776, 1964.
- J. Appelbaum, Y. Shamash, "A Method for the Optimization of a Production Line of Electromagnetic Devices", IEEE Trans. on Systems, Man and Cybernetics, Vol. SMC-7, No. 6, pp. 443–453, 1977.
- J. Bany, J. Appelbaum, "The Effect of Shading on the Design of a Field of Solar Collectors", Solar Cells, Vol. 20, No. 3, pp. 201–228, 1987.
- J. Appelbaum, O. Bergshtein, "Solar Radiation Distribution Sensor", Solar Energy, Vol. 39, No. 1, pp. 1–10, 1987.
- J. Appelbaum, "The Quality of Load Matching in a Direct-Coupling Photovoltaic System", IEEE Trans. on Energy Conversion, Vol. EC-2, pp. 534–541, 1987.
- J. Appelbaum, D.J. Flood, "Solar Radiation on Mars", Solar Energy, Vol. 45, No. 6, pp. 353–363, 1990.
- J. Appelbaum, A. Steiner, G.A. Landis, C.R. Baraona, T. Segalov, "Spectral Content of Solar Radiation on Martian Surface Based on Mars Pathfinder", American Institute of Aeronautics and Astronautics (AIAA), J. of Propulsion and Power, Vol.17, No.3, pp.508–516, 2001.
- J. Appelbaum, "Current mismatch in PV panels resulting from different locations of cells in the panel", Solar Energy, Vol.126, pp.264–275, 2016.
- A. Aronescu, J. Appelbaum, "Design optimization of photovoltaic solar fields-insight and methodology", Renewable and Sustainable Energy Reviews, Vol.76, pp.882–893, 2017.
- A. Peled, J. Appelbaum, "Enhancing the power output of PV modules by considering the view factor to sky effect and rearranging the interconnections of solar cells", Progress in Photovoltaic, 25(9),2017, doi:10.1002/pip.2896.
- J. Appelbaum, "The role of view factors in solar photovoltaic fields", Renewable and Sustainable Energy Reviews, Vol.81, pp.161–171, 2018.
- J. Appelbaum, M. Crutchik, A. Aronescu, "Curved photovoltaic collectors-convex surface", Solar Energy, Vol. 199, pp.832–836, 2020.
- A. Aronescu, J. Appelbaum, "Solar Radiation on a Parabolic Concave Surface", Energies 2021, 14, 2245. DOI: 10.3390/en14082245

Patents

- J. Appelbaum, R. Weiss, ``Educational Simulator for Electrical Devices", Patent No. 61977, 1984, Israel Patent.
- J. Appelbaum, R. Weiss, ``Solar Radiation Sensor and System Including Same for Measuring Solar Radiation Distribution", Patent No. 4,491,727, 1985, United States Patent.

== Personal life ==
Joseph Appelbaum is married to Nili, a social worker. They have three children and live in Raanana.
