= Emeric Partos =

Hungarian-American fashion designer and furrier (1905–1975)

Emeric Imre Partos (1905–1975) was a Hungarian-born fashion designer who worked in Paris and New York. He was mainly known for his work with fur for Bergdorf Goodman.

== Early life ==
Emeric Imre Partos was born in Budapest on 18 May 1905, where he studied art. He then went to the Sorbonne, Paris, to further study art, before moving to Switzerland to study jewelry design. He then returned to Paris, where in 1939 he joined the French Army, and then became involved in the French Resistance. While in Paris, Partos met the theatre costume designer and couturier Alex Maguy (born Sender Glahs). Introduced by their mutual friend Christian Dior, Maguy and Partos became close friends, and for a while during World War II, as two Eastern European Jews and members of the French underground, they hid from the Nazis in the attic of a farmhouse in Saint-Gervais-d'Auvergne. Maguy's great-niece, Hadley Freeman, has suggested that Partos, who was openly gay, may have been in a relationship with her great-uncle. After the war, Partos joined Dior at his fashion house when it opened in 1947. He was credited with helping develop the crinoline under-structures strong enough to support Dior's immensely full 'New Look' skirts. He stayed with Dior until 1950, when he was invited to be a guest designer for the New York furriers Maximilian and subsequently chose not to return to Paris, terminating his Dior contract.

== Fur design career ==
Partos worked with Maximilian unil 1955, when he was employed by Bergdorf Goodman and rapidly became known for his innovative, original and unexpected work with expensive pelts for that department store. Sally Kirkland commented that Partos "took the awe out of furs" and that while it appeared as if he treated fur like cheap burlap, his expertise and knowledge of the material allowed him to produce outstanding work. Among his designs were a towelling bathrobe lined in mink fur, white mink jackets inlaid with coloured flowers in an intarsia technique, hand-painted furs and unexpected garments such as jumpsuits, knee breeches and even a man's kilt in mink colored and pieced to resemble plaid. One of his most widely copied ideas was to make a separate raincoat shell to be worn over mink coats. He also designed clothing and accessories to accompany the furs.

He was particularly noted for his work for Barbra Streisand, who he supplied with furs for her first television appearance in 1965 which was partially filmed on-site at Bergdorf's. Streisand, previously known for wearing second-hand clothing, immediately added the furs to her wardrobe including white mink knickers and a white riding habit made from broadtail. Other regular clients included Babe Paley, Gloria Vanderbilt and Jane Engelhard.

Partos won a Special Coty Award in 1957, alongside his colleague, Leslie Morris who won a main award for her couture work in Bergdorf's made-to-order department. Eleanor Lambert wrote of Partos's show at the awards ceremony as being "a testimonial of his mastery of furrier's technique expressed in couturier terms," noting coats combining two furs or materials (such as nutria and badger fur; or ranch-farmed mink with velvet) and an informal middy top made from ermine designed for apres-ski or at-home wear.

== Death ==
Partos died of a cerebral haemorrhage at Mount Sinai Hospital on 2 December 1975. He was 70 years old and living in New York on East 65th Street. The executive vice president of Bergdorf's told The New York Times that Partos was a "small man of great stature", referring to his height of 5'3 inches. Unusually for Alex Maguy, he and Partos had remained friends all their lives despite having drifted apart, and Partos's death brought Maguy "great sadness."
