= Solomon Khromchenko =

Russian Jewish tenor singer

Solomon Markovich Khromchenko
- Born: 4 December 1907; Zlatopil, Novomyrhorod, Russian Empire
- Died: 20 January 2002 (aged 94); Moscow, Russia
- Education: Kiev Conservatory (1929–1931); Moscow Conservatory (1932–1935)
- Occupation: Singer
- Website: solomonkhromchenko.com

Solomon Markovich Khromchenko (born 4 December 1907, town of Zlatopol, Russian Empire, now Novomyrhorod, Kirovohrad district, Ukraine – died 20 January 2002, Moscow, Russia) was a Russian and Jewish tenor singer.

His vocal gift was first recognized as he was a boy in the choir of a local synagogue. Later, he was a chorister of the "Yevokans" choir ("Jewish Vocal Ensemble"). He studied at the Kiev Conservatory (1929 to 1931) under Mikhail Engel-Kron, and at the Moscow Conservatory (1932–1935), under Xenia Dorliak (the mother-in law of Sviatoslav Richter). In 1933 he was among the winners of the First AlI-Union Musical Competition in vocal category in the former USSR (Emil Gilels won in the piano category). Khromchenko was among the leading tenors of the Bolshoi Theatre.

During World War II, Khromchenko gave over a thousand concerts for Soviet troops. He was included into the selected group of Soviet performers to participate in the Kremlin concert of Victory Celebration in May 1945. In the Bolshoi he performed over twenty roles of the lyric tenor repertoire: Lensky (Eugene Onegin), the Indian Guest (Sadko), Bayan (Ruslan and Lyudmila), Vladimir (Prince Igor), Sinodal (Demon), Duke of Mantua (Rigoletto), Count Almaviva (Barber of Seville), Faust (Faust) etc. He was teaching at the Gnessin Institute since 1961. From 1992 to 2000, he was professor at Rubin Academy of Music in Jerusalem, Israel. He authored a handbook on vocal coaching.
