= Robert Appelbaum =

Swedish academic

Robert Appelbaum (born 2 February 1952) is an academic specializing in early modern writing, food studies, and terrorism studies. He is a Professor Emeritus from the Department of English at Uppsala University, in Sweden.

== Biography ==
He received a B.A. from the University of Chicago in Tutorial Studies in 1975, an M.A. in English Literature at San Francisco State University in 1989, and a Ph.D. in English from the University of California, Berkeley, where he worked under the supervision of Stephen Greenblatt.

His works include "Terrorism Before the Letter: Literatures of Political Violence in Britain and France, 1559–1642" and the 2011 volume, ''Dishing It Out: In Search of the Restaurant Experience' (London: Reaktion). In 2011, he left his position as a Senior Lecturer In Renaissance Studies at Lancaster University to take up a Chair as Professor of English Literature at Uppsala University.

His most recent book is at once an autobiography and a work of cultural criticism: Working the Aisles: A Life in Consumption (Winchester: Zero Books).
