= Yehoshua Lakner =

Swiss Israeli classical music composer

- יהושוע לקנר
- Born: 24 April 1924; Bratislava, Czechoslovakia
- Died: 5 December 2003 (aged 79); Zürich, Switzerland
- Education: Studied with Aaron Copland at Tanglewood
- Occupation: Composer
- Awards: Engel Prize of the city of Tel-Aviv (1958); Salomon David Steinberg Foundation; City of Zurich Sabbatical year for composition (1987)
- Musical career
- Genres: Contemporary classical

Yehoshua Lakner (Hebrew: יהושוע לקנר; b. Bratislava, Czechoslovakia, 24 April 1924; d. Zürich, Switzerland, 5 December 2003) was a composer of contemporary classical music. He settled in Palestine in 1941 and relocated to Zürich in 1963.

He studied with the American composer Aaron Copland at Tanglewood in 1952.

== Awards ==
- Engel Prize of the city of Tel-Aviv (1958)
- Salomon David Steinberg Foundation
- City of Zurich Sabbatical year for composition (1987)
