= Nechama Lifshitz =

Yiddish and later Hebrew language soprano and art song performer

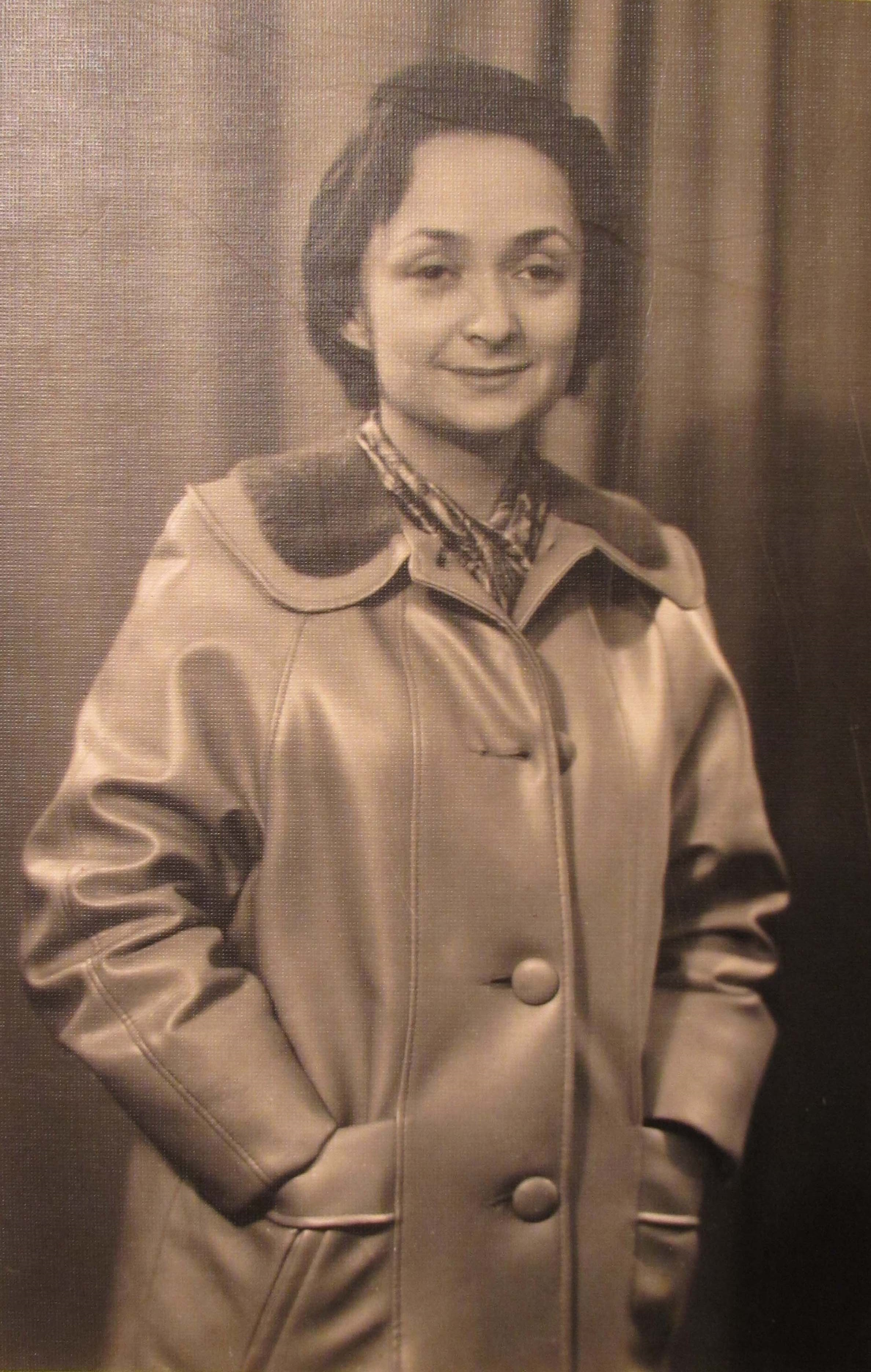
Portrait of Nechama Lifshitz

Nechama Lifshitz (Russian: Нехама Юделевна Лифшиц, Hebrew: נחמה ליפשיץ; born 1927 in Kaunas, Lithuania, died 2017 in Tel Aviv, Israel) was a Yiddish language and later Hebrew language soprano and art song performer who came to be a key representative of Soviet Jewish culture in the 1950s and 1960s. Her seemingly innocent concerts were the heart and soul of Lifshitz's contribution to keeping Jewish culture and identity alive in the Communist bloc.

== Name ==
There is no standard way of writing Lifschitz's name in the Latin alphabet, so it has been transliterated as Nehama Lifschitz, Nehamah Lipschitz, Nekhama Lifshitz, and so on, in news articles and on musical releases aimed at an English market. While she was still working in the Lithuanian SSR her name was sometimes written in its Lithuanian form Nechama Lifšicaitė, or Lifshitzaite. In YIVO transliteration from Yiddish her name would be spelled Nekhame Lifshits.

== Biography ==
=== Early life ===
Nechama Lifshitz was born in Kaunas in 1927 before Lithuania became part of the Soviet Union. Her father, Yehuda Zvi-Hirsh Lifshitz, was a doctor, businessman and Zionist activist. Her father, who played the violin, was a musical influence on her, as well as her mother Batya who sang regularly. In her youth, she attended the Kaunas Real Hebrew Gymnasium. During the Second World War she, her parents and sister fled east to Uzbekistan ahead of the conquering German army. In 1946 she returned to Kaunas with her family. She enrolled in the Lithuanian Music Academy, where she received training to sing in the Lithuanian, Ukrainian, Uzbek, and Russian languages. At that time it was not possible to be academically trained as a Yiddish language singer except at the Yiddish State Theater in Moscow. She graduated from the Music Academy of Lithuania in 1951.

=== Musical career ===
Early in her career Lifshitz sang as a soloist in the Kaunas Opera, performing Barber of Sevilla, Rigoletto and other productions. Her first Yiddish language concert was in 1951. However, it would be several more years before she could perform more widely. During the early Khrushchev era in the Soviet Union, in the mid-1950s, some forms of Jewish cultural revival were allowed. This was mainly limited to Yiddish concerts, which helped propel singers such as Lifschitz, and others like Sidi Tal and Mikhail Epelbaum, to officially-sanctioned popularity. Other forms of expression, such as the publication of Yiddish language books, remained banned. Even with Yiddish folk music concerts, they were strictly controlled in terms of who was able to perform them, and even whether the word Yiddish could be mentioned on the poster, and so on.

In the early 1950s Lifshitz often appeared with Ino Topper, a singer who had studied with her. Around 1955 she became acquainted with Mark Braudo, a Jewish actor in Lithuania. He proposed that they start a troupe that would perform songs and scenes in Yiddish. The group was soon founded under the umbrella of the Lithuanian SSR Philharmonic For the rest of her career in the Soviet Union she was essentially an employee of the Lithuanian Philharmonic.

However, they had little access to Yiddish music in the Lithuanian SSR, and so Lifshitz went to Moscow to meet the composers Shaul Senderei and Lev Pulver. Pulver had been director of the Moscow Yiddish State Theater for years, and gave her material by Avram Goldfaden, Sholem Aleichem and others. Senderei, on the other hand, agreed to harmonize eighteen Jewish songs for her, which would be paid for by the Lithuanian Philharmonic Society. In his memoirs, Braudo listed the repertoire in those first concerts: Pulver and Senderei's compositions, as well as the work of L. Kahan and L. Yampolsky, set to music with texts by poets Shmuel Halkin, Yosef Kotlyar, Zalman Shneur, and S. Ansky. In addition they sang songs by Mordechai Gebirtig and various Jewish folk songs. They also read poems by Shmuel Halkin and Yosef Kotlyar and Hirsch Osherovich and some short stories by Eliezer Steinberg and Sholem Aleichem.

With that material, Lifshitz gave her first Yiddish concert in Vilnius in 1956. She then made appearances in Latvia and Lithuania, in Leningrad and then in cities in Uzbekistan and Tajikistan. The following year she made more tours to Estonia, Russia, and Belorussia. It was in 1957 that the first 78 rpm recording was made of her singing.

In 1958 she won the First prize in an all-Soviet Competition for variety artists. According to Braudo, her success in that contest caught the attention of the press in Moscow, which rarely gave any coverage to Jewish artists. Thus her first concerts in Moscow were in May 1958. Many of the surviving members of the prewar Yiddish cultural world came to the concert, including Shmuel Halkin (whose poems she had performed), and the widows of Der Nister, Itzik Fefer, Perets Markish, and others. Most of the former actors of the Moscow Yiddish State Theatre attended as well. At around this time, one of the most well known Soviet Yiddish singers Mikhail Alexandrovich convinced her that she was talented enough to give solo concerts and that she did not need to travel with the Lithuanian troupe.

In 1959 the hundredth anniversary of the birth of Sholem Aleichem was celebrated in the Soviet Union with various concerts and official events. During that celebration Lifshitz gave a concert in every Soviet Republic. In Moscow she performed alongside Paul Robeson. The new material she added for the centenary concerts and a show of Sholem Aleichem "Wandering Stars" (Yiddish - Blonjedike Shtern) composed by Abraham Rubinstein, with montages by Leonid Lurie, director of the Russian Theatre in Vilnius, artist Rafael Chwoles and with music by Lev Pulver.

However, during this tour she encountered some hostility from officials, such as in Minsk, where Party Secretary for Propaganda Timofei Gorbunov forbade her concert, or in Vinnitsa, where her concert was partly censored for containing 'nationalist' materials. In Kyiv after she sang the heart-rending lullaby "Babi Yar", by Shike Driz and Rivke Boyarsky, adjacent to the site of the Babi Yar massacre of 1941, she was not allowed to perform in the city of Kyiv anymore. Officials forced her to include more and more Russian-language material in her concerts. Nonetheless, during this time she felt exhilarated by being able to perform in Yiddish for Jewish populations large or small, and that her concerts became cultural "happenings" that took on a significance beyond the performance of music. In 1959 she also performed in the Hebrew language for the first time, something which was forbidden and had barely been heard on Soviet stages since the 1920s.

In 1959 and 1960, she was permitted to perform abroad in Paris, Vienna, Brussels, and Antwerp. This tour was meant to demonstrate to the world that the Soviet Union did not discriminate against Jewish culture. In the Paris concert in March 1959, she shared the stage with Mikhail Alexandrovich. During 1960 and 1961, two LPs of her music were released by the state music label Melodiya, which would be reprinted a number of times.

In the late 1950s and early 1960s she continued to give regular concerts in the Soviet Union, although it became difficult for her to get permission to perform in cities with a large Jewish population. Even in cases where she was able to perform, she was criticized for performing "pessimistic" music about the plight of the Jews in Tsarist times and during the Second World War, and not enough about building a communist society.

As her career progressed, she added more Hebrew language materials to her concerts, and her clandestine connection with Israel increased. The amount of Hebrew content in her concerts increased in particular after 1965. She had developed a relationship with the Israeli embassy in Moscow in the late 1950s and they gave her records, scores, and books over the years. This close relationship would cause her problems with the Soviet authorities. She was asked by the KGB to avoid meeting with Israelis. In 1966 Lifshitz made her first application to emigrate to Israel, which caused her performances to be canceled by Soviet authorities for several months. However, in 1967 she was allowed to perform again, and made a number of tours in Lithuania, Siberia, and in Central Asia till 1969. At around this time she also started a written correspondence with the Israeli singer Naomi Shemer, whose family also came from Lithuania.

=== Emigration to Israel ===
In March 1969 she was finally given an exit visa to emigrate to Israel. Apparently this came as a surprise to many people, and may have been a result of Leonid Brezhnev trying to interfere with the Jewish cultural revival by getting rid of some of its major figures. After a sold-out concert in April 1969 which was attended by Israeli Prime Minister Golda Meir (who also sponsored the event), and most of her government as well as artists, writers, editors, and thousands more, she greatly reduced her performance schedule once in Israel—she later said that she "felt like a partisan when the war was over." After studying at Bar-Ilan University, in 1976 she became a librarian in the Tel Aviv municipal music library and later on the director of this library. Despite her reduced performance schedule, a number of new recordings and TV shows were made of her in the years after her arrival to Israel.

In 1978, she was awarded the Manger Prize. In 2006 she was elected chairman of the World Council for Yiddish Language and Jewish Culture. In 2004, she received the title of Honorable Citizen of the City of Tel Aviv-Yafo.

In 1997, she was invited to return to St. Petersburg to teach and perform Yiddish song at a seminar on Jewish musical culture, which gave her a connection to the younger generation of post-Perestroika Yiddish language singers in Russia. Seeing an opportunity to continue that work with a younger generation and to pass her heritage, she launched her own workshop in Israel for Yiddish vocalists which she ran almost till her death. That workshop still bears her name.

She died in Tel Aviv on 21 April 2017, shortly before her ninetieth birthday. Her personal archive of music and correspondence has been donated to the National Library of Israel.

== Selected discography ==
- Еврейские Песни В Исполнении Нехамы Лифшицайте / Recital By N. Lifshitsaite (Melodya, 1961)
- Chansons Populaires Juives Interpretées par N. Lifchitzaite (SovDisc)
- Nekhama Lifshitz - Yiddish Folk Singer - Sings the Songs of Her People in the U.S.S.R. (Collector's Guild, 1963)
- Recital N. Lifshitsaite (Melodiya, 1969)
- Nehama Lifschitz In Concert (CBS, 1969)
- Nehama Lifschitz in Concert - Tel Aviv & Jerusalem 1969 (Columbia Records, 1969)
- Nehama Lifschitz (CBS)
- Mayn Farmeygn: Nechama Lifschitz Live in Moscow 1964 (2003)
