= Lilly Appelbaum Malnik =

Belgian Holocaust survivor (born 1928)

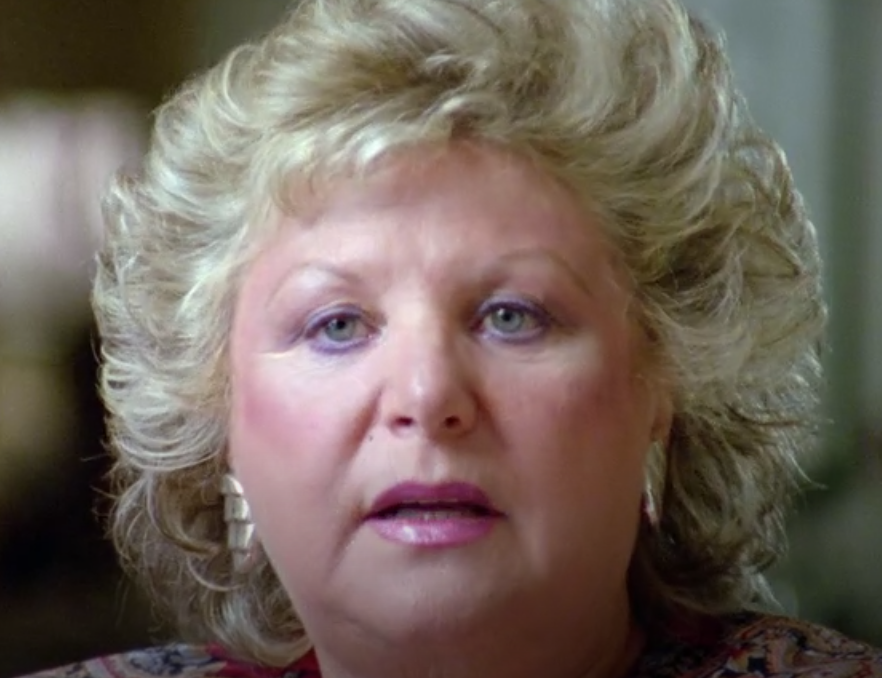
- Malnik in 1992
- Born: Lilly Appelbaum; 5 November 1928 (age 97); Antwerp, Belgium
- Spouse: Abraham Malnik
- Children: 3
- Relatives: Miriam Ezagui (granddaughter)

Lilly Appelbaum Malnik (born 5 November 1928) is a Belgian-American Holocaust survivor who helped create the United States Holocaust Memorial Museum. She was captured by Nazi soldiers in 1944, during the German occupation of Belgium, and was imprisoned at the Mechelen transit camp in Belgium, Auschwitz concentration camp in occupied Poland, and the Bergen-Belsen concentration camp in Germany. She was liberated from Bergen-Belsen in April 1945 by the British Army. Malnik's mother, two siblings, aunt and uncle, and grandaunt and granduncle were all killed during The Holocaust in Belgium. After World War II, she emigrated to the United States and was reunited with her father. She married Abraham Malnik, a Soviet Holocaust survivor, and they assisted in the founding of the United States Holocaust Memorial Museum. With her granddaughter, the American social media content creator Miriam Ezagui, Malnik has made TikTok videos detailing life in concentration camps.

== Early life ==
Lilly Appelbaum Malnik was born to Belgian Jewish parents in Antwerp on 5 November 1928. Her parents separated prior to her birth. Her mother moved to Brussels with her two elder children to operate a small raincoat workshop and left Malnik in the care of her grandparents, who lived in a Jewish neighborhood near the center of the Antwerp diamond district. She grew up in her grandparents' apartment, where her grandfather operated a shoemaking business. Since her family was poor, Malnik was educated in a public school instead of the local private Jewish school. After her grandmother died in 1939, Malnik was sent back to her mother in Brussels.

== World War II and The Holocaust ==
In 1940, Germany invaded Belgium. In 1942, Malnik was hospitalized with tonsillitis. While she was in the hospital, her sister was sent to a Nazi concentration camp. Her mother and brother were later discovered and also taken away. All three relatives were killed during The Holocaust in Belgium. Upon being released from the hospital, Malnik went into hiding with the help from non-Jewish neighbors. She began working in a factory and at a beauty salon to support herself. While working at the salon, she had to give a Nazi officer a manicure and massage.

In 1944, while visiting her aunt and uncle in the suburbs of Brussels, she awoke to two Nazi soldiers, armed with rifles, banging on the door. She and her family were rounded up and sent to the Mechelen transit camp for six weeks. On the sixth week in Mechelen, she was placed in a cattle car with other Jews as part of the second-to-last transport of Jews out of the country before the Liberation of Belgium. She arrived, with her aunt and uncle, at Auschwitz concentration camp in Occupied Poland and witnessed bodies of those who died from suffocation or being trampled being pulled from the cattle cars. The survivors were filed into a line and sorted by the German Nazi doctor Josef Mengele. It was here that she was separated from her aunt and uncle, who were immediately taken to the ovens and burned alive. Malnik was taken into the camp and had her head shaved before being forced to shower and was tattooed twice.

While imprisoned, she befriended a Christian girl from France named Christiane who had been caught in a roundup by mistake. Malnik was made to stand for hours at a time during roll calls and worked in the camp's kitchens. While working in the kitchen, she snuck potatoes to feed a group of Hungarian Jews who were set to be executed the following day. Malnik was imprisoned in Auschwitz for fourteen months.

In 1945, the Soviet Union's Red Army was approaching so Malnik and other inmates were evacuated and sent on a death march to the Bergen-Belsen concentration camp in Germany. Throughout the march, she witnessed German soldiers shooting at prisoners. Malnik's friend, Christiane, contracted typhus at Bergen-Belsen and died there, and Malnik later caught the disease.

In April 1945, Malnik was one of 60,000 prisoners liberated from Bergen-Belsen by the British Army. Upon being liberated, she was emaciated and only weighed 70 pounds. She was carried out by a stretcher and spent the first few weeks of her freedom in a makeshift field hospital. After two months of hospitalization, she was taken back to Belgium by the Red Cross.

== Adult life ==
In 1947, Malnik emigrated to the United States and was reunited with her father, who had left Belgium prior to the outbreak of World War II.

While living in Washington, D.C., she met Abraham Malnik, a Holocaust survivor from Lithuania. They married and had three sons. She and her husband were active in establishing the United States Holocaust Museum. Malnik's husband, who died in 2007, served as a witness in the denaturalization case against Lithuanian police officer Jonas Stelmokas, who participated in the 1941 massacre of 9,000 Jews of the Kovno Ghetto.

Malnik recorded a survivor testimony for the collection at the Alabama Holocaust Education Center in Birmingham.

She later lived in Florida before moving to Clarksville, Maryland during the COVID-19 pandemic in the United States in order to be closer to her family.

She has shared her experiences during the Holocaust on her granddaughter, Miriam Ezagui,'s TikTok account. One video, where Malnik discussed drugs given to female inmates at Auschwitz to prevent them from menstruating, received over 23.3 million views. Her testimony was included in a study on infertility among Holocaust survivors by a Canadian professor.

In February 2023, she spoke at the Chabad Lubavitch Center for Jewish Life in Columbia, Maryland at an event presented by Chabad of Ellicott City. In her speech, she spoke about the importance of remembering more than six million Jewish people who were killed during The Holocaust in Europe, including her own family members.
