= Eliezer Steinbarg =

Eliezer Steinbarg (Yiddish: אֱליעזֶר שטיינבארג Eliezer Shteynbarg; 2 March 1880 – 27 March 1932) was a Yiddish-school teacher and Yiddish poetic fabulist.

He was born in Lipcani, Bessarabia and became a teacher in Bessarabia and Volhynia. In 1902 he became a poet in Yiddish, but did not have his works published until after his death. He taught Yiddish and Hebrew, wrote and directed children's plays and was an editor of Kultur, a Yiddish arts journal. He became a notable figure in the Yiddish culture of Romania, and his works were widely recited.

His first published work Mesholim, a book of fables, did not appear until shortly after his death, when it became a bestseller. Selected works of Eliezer Steinbarg can be found in the bilingual The Jewish Book of Fables (2003), translated by Curt Leviant. He lies buried in the Jewish cemetery in Chernivtsi. The Eliezer Steinbarg Jewish Cultural Society in Chernivtsi is named after him.
