= Emil Gorovets =

American singer

Emil Gorovets Эмиль Горовец
- Born: Rahmil Yacovlevich Gorovets; 10 June 1923; Haisyn, Ukraine, USSR
- Origin: Jewish Ukrainian
- Died: 17 August 2001 (aged 78) New York City, United States
- Genres: Pop, Classical music
- Instrument: Vocals
- Years active: 1955–2001

Rahmil "Emil" Yacovlevich Gorovets (Russian: Рахмиль Яковлевич Горовец; 10 June 1923, in Haisyn, Ukraine – 17 August 2001, in New York City) was a famous Soviet Ukrainian singer of Jewish origin, Gorovets standing for Horovitz in Russian. Gorovets' voice in between a tenor and baritone, was bright and had lush tonal coloration and emotional interpretations. Besides his hits in Russian, Ukrainian and Yiddish, he was also known to sing European and American famous hits in Russian.

Better known as Emil Gorovets (in Russian Эмиль Горовец), he graduated from the Moscow State Jewish Theater as a soloist. He began to sing in Yiddish. In 1955, he started singing in a jazz band Mosestrady (in Russian Мосэстрады) with Eddie Rosner. In 1959 went on tour in Paris with a group of other artists for the 100th anniversary celebration of Sholem Aleichem, a leading author and playwright in Yiddish. In 1960 he won the All-Union Competition for Best Entertainer in the Soviet Union and started singing in Russian, which was his third language after Yiddish and Ukrainian.

Gorovets was a performer renowned for several hits, including "Королева красоты" (meaning Beauty Queen) from Arno Babajanian, "Дрозды" by Vladimir Shainsky, "Голубые города" (meaning Blue city) and "Я шагаю по Москве" (meaning I walk around Moscow) both by Andrey Petrov, "I Walk around Moscow" became the soundtrack of a famous film that came out after release of the single. Besides Babajanian, Shainsky, and Petrov, many more composers and songwriters wrote songs for him including Yan Frenkel, Vano Muradeli, Modest Tabachnikov, Eddie Rosner and others. In 1963, Radio Yunost, the primary youth radio in the Soviet Union broadcast his 45-minute concert throughout the Soviet Union, making him famous.

In the early 1970s, the Jewish song repertoire on Soviet radio and television came under an unofficial but well-known ban. Gorovets' songs were included in the ban because of his Jewish origin. In 1972, Gorovets and his wife, the actress Margarita Polonskaya (in Russian Маргарита Полонская), his partner and assistant, applied to emigrate to Israel, where they arrived in 1973. But his work did not develop that well in Israel, particularly Yiddish and Russian culture that was Gorovets' niche.

He moved to the United States upon the invitation of New York mayor Edward Koch and a 7-year offer from Der Arbeter Ring. Gorovets also made a point of coming back to Israel, made an all-Israel tour of 22 concerts in the span of one month before returning to the United States. He also worked as a singing teacher and gave many concerts mainly at Manhattan's best known Russian restaurant the "Balalaika" as main soloist of the venue. However it was a big step back from his star status in the Soviet Union. He also worked at a Jewish radio station, that aired three times a week. He gradually built up new audiences through self-penned new songs. He also made Russian covers of well-known Yiddish-language classics. He also promoted Yiddish ("Mameloshn" – Yiddish for "native language", literally "mother's tongue") on the radio WMNB, and on the radio Надежда ("Hope").

Through the emigration of Soviet Yiddish population, he gained great popularity in Israel through pop tunes that spanned from Israel to Jewish communities in America and Western Europe, thus introducing to them the Yiddish culture from the Soviet era.

Living in a high-rise complex in Manhattan's East River on the shore, he turned one of the three rooms into a studio, where he recorded a significant number of old song remakes and some new songs in many languages, even some operatic arias.

In 1989, he made a comeback in Moscow, where he received a good-enough promotion, and his songs were broadcast on Russian all-union radios.

After the death of his wife, he dedicated a song to her. Then he met Irina, who had just immigrated from Moscow. She became his third wife. He spent the rest of his life releasing some records, arranging for concerts associated with Jewish performers, and even wrote songs for others.

Gorovets died in 2001 in New York at the age of 79 and was buried in a cemetery in New Jersey alongside his earlier wife Margaret Polonsky.
