= Mikhail Alexandrovich =

Latvian tenor, cantor (1914–2002)

Mikhail Davidovich Alexandrovich, a.k.a. Misha Alexandrovich (23 July 1914, Bērzpils, Vitebsk Governorate – 3 July 2002, Munich) was a Latvian Jewish tenor, and cantor, internationally acclaimed as a fine performer of classical and popular repertoire in several languages.

He performed for nearly 75 years, since his first concert as a 9-year old in Riga, until the last one, in Moscow, May 26, 1997.

== Biography ==
Mikhail Alexandrovich was born on the 23 of July 1914, in the village of Bērzpils, Vitebsk Governorate (now part of Balvi Municipality, Latvia), in the family of Jewish peasants.

From 1920 to 1926, aged six to twelve, he gained popularity as a child prodigy. He studied at and graduated from the Riga Conservatory. In 1930s for a long time he was a hazzan (cantor) at synagogues in Riga, Manchester (1934–1937) and Kaunas (1937–1940).

Since the Soviet occupation of Latvia in 1940 onwards he was a concert and chamber music singer in the USSR. For his concert performances he was awarded the honorary title of Meritorious Artist of the RSFSR (1947) and the Stalin Prize (1948). However, since 1961 an official restriction was placed on his solo concerts.

He emigrated to live in Israel from 1971 to 1974, then to the United States from 1975 to 1990, and from 1990 until his death he lived in Germany.

== Recordings ==
- In the Soviet Union he recorded between 70 and 90 78 records and LPs with a total circulation of twenty two million copies.
- The Argentine composer Osvaldo Golijov wrote a version of "K'vakarat" (text from the prayer of Yom Kippur) for cantor Misha Alexandrovich and the Kronos Quartet.
- CD. The Art of Misha Alexandrovich. Cantorial recitatives, Hebrew and Yiddish songs, classical arias and art songs.

== Family ==
His wife was Raisa Aleksandrovich. The whole family of Raisa and nearly all family of Mikhail perished during the Holocaust.

IN 1971, his niece, Ruth Aleksandrovich, has attracted international attention as one of the youngest prisoners of conscience in the world, imprisoned for circulating literature about Israel and advocating the teaching of Hebrew language.
