= Marina Gordon =

American opera singer

Marina Gordon (11 December 1917 – 13 December 2013) was a Belarusian-born American singer and coloratura soprano. She has been known as a performer of popular songs written to lyrics by contemporaneous authors in Yiddish, Russian, and Belarusian in the USSR and in the United States.

== Life and career ==
Marina Gordon was born on December 11, 1917, in Minsk, Belarus. At the age of 16, she was accepted into the vocal studio of the Minsk Opera House. Thereafter, she continued studies at the Minsk Conservatory. In 1940 she was granted the option to continue her vocal training at the Glazunov College of Theatre and Music in Moscow, where she graduated in 1946. Meanwhile, she was accepted as a soloist to the USSR State Pop Orchestra. During World War II she got enlisted first into the militia, than drafted into the Soviet Army to perform in military arts ensembles for Soviet troops. After World War II she was a soloist of the Moscow Variety Shows Enterprise. Upon retiring, she immigrated to the US in 1977. Gordon died on December 13, 2013, in New York.

== Repertoire and recordings ==
Marina Gordon was performing mostly contemporaneous Russian and Belarusian songs, premiering many works by once highly celebrated Soviet composers like Isaac Dunayevsky, Yuri Milyutin, and the Pokrass Brothers. In 1956 she participated in a Jewish concert, the first to be allowed by Soviet authorities since the infamous "Night of the Murdered Poets". Marina Gordon performed a selection of songs composed to verses by contemporaneous Yiddish poets who lived in the USSR. Since then she championed a similar repertoire created by composers Lev Pulver, Lev Yampolsky, Samuel Polonsky, Rebecka Boyarska, Samuel Senderey and others. She was giving solo performances and was participating in concerts featuring music, poetry and drama by Yiddish actors Leah and Joseph Kolins. She made numerous recordings of contemporary Jewish songs. Her last two albums were recorded in collaboration with concertmaster/pianist David Ashkenazi (the father of the legendary Vladimir Ashkenazi) and the Soviet State Broadcast Pop Orchestra under direction of Vladimir Terletsky.

== Sources ==
- Rita Ottens. «Ich mochte stolz sein auf die Kunst meines Volkes». Neue Zeitschrift für Musik 2006/04 Schott Music. Mainz. Germany (in German). Subscription required.
