= Atreus (disambiguation) =

Atreus is a character in Greek mythology.

Atreus can also mean:

- 14791 Atreus, an asteroid
- Atreus (God of War), a video game character
- Atreus, a lost play by Lucius Accius
- The Treasury of Atreus, a Bronze Age tholos tomb at Mycenae

== See also ==
- Atrus, a character in the Myst series of games
- House Atreides, the royal house in Frank Herbert's Dune universe
