= List of God of War characters =

List of fictional characters from the God of War video game franchise

Characters from the original God of War: (front left) Kratos with original blue coloring, the Body Burner, the Oracle of Athens, Kratos, his wife Lysandra, his daughter Calliope, the Boat Captain, the Gravedigger, Athenian soldiers, and (lying in front) the twins Zora and Lora. Behind the characters are several monsters from the game.

The characters of the God of War video game franchise belong to a fictional universe based on Greek mythology and Norse mythology. As such, the series features a range of traditional figures, including those from Greek mythology, such as the Olympian Gods, Titans, and Greek heroes, and those from Norse mythology, including the Æsir and Vanir gods and other beings. A number of original characters have also been created to supplement storylines.

The overall story arc focuses on the series' primary playable single-player character, the protagonist Kratos, a Spartan warrior haunted by visions of himself accidentally killing his wife and child. The character finally avenges his family by killing his former master and manipulator, Ares, the God of War. Although Kratos became the new God of War, he was still plagued by nightmares and eventually betrayed by Zeus, the King of the Olympian Gods—revealed by the goddess Athena to be Kratos' father. The constant machinations of the gods and Titans and their misuse of Kratos eventually drove him to destroy Mount Olympus. Many years following the destruction of Olympus, Kratos ended up in ancient Scandinavia in the realm of Midgard fathering a son named Atreus (known to prophecy as Loki) with the Jötunn warrior Faye. Their journey to keep a promise to the boy's late mother ended with Kratos and Atreus becoming enemies to the Norse gods, and ultimately set about the events of Ragnarök, a catastrophic event that the Allfather Odin was desperate to prevent, but ultimately ends with Odin's death and the destruction of Asgard. After facing the trials of Valhalla, Kratos finally comes to terms with his past and becomes the new Norse God of War, championing the ideals of hope.

God of War (2005), created by Sony's Santa Monica Studio, was the inaugural game in the series, the main part of which continued with God of War II (2007), God of War III (2010), and series prequel Ascension (2013); and side games Betrayal (2007), Chains of Olympus (2008), and Ghost of Sparta (2010). These seven games comprised the Greek era of the series. The Norse era began with the sequel to God of War III, which is also titled God of War (2018) and concluded with Ragnarök (2022), which received an epilogue in the form of an expansion pack titled Valhalla (2023). The God of War mythos expanded into literature, with a novelization of the original God of War published in 2010, and a six-issue comic series (2010–11) that introduced new characters and plot developments, telling a parallel story of Kratos's present and past, taking place immediately after the 2005 installment while also exploring a journey from when he was a Spartan soldier prior to his pledge to Ares. A novelization of God of War II was published in 2013. A prequel graphic novel titled Rise of the Warrior (2012–13) was released in the lead up to Ascension and is the backstory of the player's multiplayer character. To go along with the 2018 installment, a text-based game, A Call from the Wilds, a short prequel story about Atreus's first adventure into the wilderness, was released in February 2018, followed by a novelization in August, and then a two-volume comic series (2018–2019; 2021), with the first volume showing Kratos just before the 2018 installment, trying to settle down in the Norse world with his new wife Faye and their son Atreus, while the second volume follows Kratos's journey from ancient Greece to Norway after God of War III.

God of War has become a highly lucrative franchise on account of the commercial and critical success of the series. Products include action figures, artwork, clothing, Slurpee cups, sweepstakes, and special edition video game consoles. The character of Kratos received positive comments from reviewers, with his original Greek variation described as a "sympathetic antihero" by GameSpy. Game Guru claimed "Practically anyone, even if they hadn't played any of the God of War games, would know about Kratos". Several reviewers have praised the portrayal of other characters: PALGN claimed that the original God of War's voice acting was "up there with the best", while IGN complimented most of the games in the series, saying of God of War II that the characters were "timeless" and the voice acting was "great". The Norse era was also well received, with the interactions between Kratos and Atreus in 2018's God of War receiving praise and the humanization of Kratos, who was regarded as conveying more character than in the Greek games. The characterizations of the Norse gods in Ragnarök were also praised as being uniquely different than popular portrayals, such as seen in the Marvel Cinematic Universe.

== Concept and creation ==
During the creation of the original God of War, the game's director David Jaffe attempted to create a version of Kratos that looked brutal but had a different appearance from what is considered to be the traditional Greek hero. The character's traditional armor was removed to show the character's individualism, and details such as hair and other "flowing things" were removed. Jaffe said of his final version of the character, that while "[Kratos] may not totally feel at home in Ancient Greece from a costume standpoint, I think he achieves the greater purpose which is to give players a character who they can play who really does just let them go nuts and unleash the nasty fantasies that they have in their head". Kratos' appearance was updated in 2018's God of War due to the new Nordic setting. The designers gave Kratos a Nordic look that includes a full beard and changed his main weapon to a magical battle ax to make the combat more grounded. Unlike previous games, players can change and upgrade Kratos's three armor pieces, one of the game's role playing video game (RPG) elements.

When designing Ares, Charlie Wen was advised that the character should be 90% elemental and 5–10% human, then began sketching. He said that the rest of the team liked the designs, but were uncertain about execution. The transition towards Ares' human form was slow, and Wen said of the final design, "he's still a huge guy, but he's got all this armor on that allows him to do all these things". Like most of the Olympian gods in the original God of War, Zeus first appeared as a floating translucent head, and was modeled on the typical representation of the god in Greek mythology. God of War II's game director Cory Barlog said that for that game, they wanted to maintain Zeus' appearance from literature, but also to add their own interpretation to the character. Zeus' human appearance was originally designed by Charlie Wen for God of War II. This design was also used in God of War III, with updated graphics and the addition of an arm piece during the final fight. Andy Park was responsible for designing Zeus' spirit form for the final fight. Park produced several sketches, and imagined Zeus as a "massive tornado creature with lightning searing throughout the form". Park said that the ultimate goal was that "we are looking at Zeus, but it is him transformed into a big cloud of smoke".

Hades in 2005's God of War (left) and the reimagined appearance introduced in 2007's God of War II (right)

Hades first appeared in 2005's God of War; the original design portrayed Hades as a fiery, demonic face with horns. Statues in the game adhered to this design. Hades' character design was changed in God of War II, with the character now appearing in a more human-like form with spikes protruding from his body and wielding a pair of chained claws, similar to Kratos' chained blades. The updated design featured a helmet that appeared to cover a fiery face, which in God of War III is revealed to be very grotesque but more human-like than the original design from the first game. Hermes was originally designed for God of War II by Andy Park and did appear in the final cut scene of the game. For God of War III, Park updated the design and painting of the character. Park said he "wanted to create a character that was sly, cunning, and a bit comical in both appearance and personality" and he imagined he would be "much like a dancer".

The Titan Oceanus was sketched by Erik San Juan and was originally intended to appear in God of War II in a completely watery form with no feet. This concept, however, was cut during development. Oceanus appeared in God of War III, with a similar appearance to the other Titans and with an emphasis on lightning instead of the original watery design. Oceanus's original watery design was the basis of the design for Poseidon's avatar sea construct for God of War III.

The character Daedalus was designed by Izzy Medrano, who said that he imagined Daedalus as a brilliant architect gone mad, and that Daedalus, similar to Kratos, was a pawn of the gods. The character was originally intended to have long white hair, but was eventually rendered bald, "as long hair is a difficult thing to manage". Icarus was conceived as an "old disgusting man" and portrayed as an evil, although slightly comedic, character. Medrano also designed Pandora, who he said is vital in reintroducing the player to the human side of Kratos. Medrano also said that they knew Pandora had to be young and reminiscent of Kratos' daughter, Calliope, and that "[Pandora] had to be pretty without being sexy and spunky without being saucy". Medrano said the character's final attire was a "Greek Punk" fashion style.

The first version of the Gorgon, Medusa, was to have five feet, but due to perceived animation difficulties, the final version had one tail. Other Gorgons in the game adhered to this design. The goddess Artemis was considered for inclusion in God of War: Ascension as a playable female character, offering alternative combat options. Game Director Todd Papy said she would have been depicted as half-human and half-feline, with the head and torso of a woman and the legs of a lioness. However, she was ultimately cut from the game and thus only appears in the original God of War as a translucent head.

Unlike the popular portrayal of Thor by Chris Hemsworth in the Marvel Cinematic Universe (MCU), the Thor in God of War Ragnarök looks closer to his depiction in Norse mythological literature, having a hefty build with long red hair and beard. This type of design portrayal was similarly done for the other Norse gods, as in the literature, the Norse gods were not as extravagant as the Greek gods.

== Overview ==
List indicators

This section includes characters who have appeared in two or more installments in the series.

- An empty grey cell indicates the character was not in the game.
- ^{C} indicates a cameo role.
- ^{O} indicates an older version of the character.
- ^{Y} indicates a younger version of the character.

Character	Greek era games							Norse era games			Crossover games	
Character	God of War	God of War II	Chains of Olympus	God of War III	Ghost of Sparta	Ascension	Sons of Sparta	God of War	Ragnarök	Laufey	Soulcalibur: Broken Destiny	PlayStation All-Stars Battle Royale
Character	2005	2007	2008	2010	2010	2013	2026	2018	2022	TBA	2009	2012
Main
Kratos	Terrence C. Carson	Terrence C. Carson	Terrence C. Carson	Terrence C. Carson	Terrence C. Carson Antony Del Rio^{Y}	Terrence C. Carson	Terrence C. Carson Antony Del Rio^{Y}	Christopher Judge^{O}	Christopher Judge^{O}	Christopher Judge^{O}	Terrence C. Carson	Terrence C. Carson
Zeus	Paul Eiding	Corey Burton		Corey Burton	Fred Tatasciore	Corey Burton		Corey Burton^{C}				Corey Burton
Athena	Carole Ruggier	Carole Ruggier	Erin Torpey	Erin Torpey	Erin Torpey			Carole Ruggier			Erin Torpey	
Ares	Steve Blum			Fred Tatasciore	Steve Blum	Steve Blum					Steve Blum	
Deimos				Elijah Wood	Mark Deklin Bridger Zadina^{Y}		Scott Menville^{Y}					
Atreus / Loki								Sunny Suljic	Sunny Suljic	Sunny Suljic		
Mímir								Alastair Duncan	Alastair Duncan			
Freya								Danielle Bisutti	Danielle Bisutti			
Baldur								Jeremy Davies	Jeremy Davies			
Thor								No voice^{C}	Ryan Hurst			
Angrboda									Laya DeLeon Hayes			
Odin									Richard Schiff			
Faye								No voice	Deborah Ann Woll	Deborah Ann Woll		
Supporting
Gaia	Linda Hunt	Linda Hunt	Linda Hunt	Susan Blakeslee	Linda Hunt	Linda Hunt						
The Boat Captain	Keith Ferguson^{C}	Keith Ferguson^{C}		Josh Keaton^{C}			Keith Ferguson	Keith Ferguson^{C}	Keith Ferguson^{C}			
Poseidon	Fred Tatasciore	No voice		Gideon Emery	Gideon Emery	Gideon Emery						
King Alrik	Bob Joles	Fred Tatasciore		Fred Tatasciore		Fred Tatasciore						
Lysandra	Gwendoline Yeo	No voice		Gwendoline Yeo		Jennifer Hale						
Hades	Nolan North	No voice		Clancy Brown		Fred Tatasciore						
Aphrodite	Carole Ruggier			April Stewart								
Artemis	Claudia Black											
Cronos	No voice	Lloyd Sherr		George Ball								
Calliope	No voice		Debi Derryberry	Debi Derryberry			Debi Derryberry					
The Last Spartan		Josh Keaton			Gideon Emery							
Lakhesis		Leigh-Allyn Baker		Leigh-Allyn Baker								
Atropos		Debi Mae West		Marina Gordon								
Clotho		Susan Silo		Marina Gordon								
Atlas		Michael Clarke Duncan	Fred Tatasciore									
Helios			Dwight Schultz	Crispin Freeman					Crispin Freeman			
Persephone			Marina Gordon	No voice								
Hercules				Kevin Sorbo								
Alecto						Jennifer Hale						
Orkos						Troy Baker						
Brok								Robert Craighead	Robert Craighead			
Sindri								Adam J. Harrington	Adam J. Harrington			
The World Serpent								Mike Niederquell	Mike Niederquell			
Ratatoskr								No voice	SungWon Cho			
Thrúd									Mina Sundwall			
Týr									Ben Prendergast			
Heimdall									Scott Porter			
Freyr									Brett Dalton			
Phranque										Jack Quaid		
Rue										Perlina Lau		

== Major characters ==
=== Kratos ===
Kratos is the primary character of the God of War series. He was originally portrayed as a power-hungry Spartan who, to save his life, was eventually forced to serve the Olympian god Ares, committing numerous atrocities in his name. During one murderous rampage, Kratos accidentally killed his wife and daughter. He then renounced Ares, became a tormented soul (including imprisonment by the Furies), and served the gods for ten years in hopes of becoming free of the nightmares. He eventually killed Ares and became the God of War, but was betrayed by his father, Zeus. A series of attempts to free himself from the influence of the gods and Titans followed, culminating in a final confrontation with Zeus, ending in the god's death and the reign of the Olympian Gods. In the aftermath, Athena appeared and Kratos sacrificed himself to prevent her from becoming the supreme goddess of the world. Many years later, surviving his fatal sacrifice, Kratos relocated to the world of the Norse gods in Midgard, fathering a son named Atreus. Following the death of his second wife Faye, he and Atreus journey to the highest peak of the nine realms to fulfill her promise and spread her ashes there. Along their journey, Kratos eventually reveals that he is a god to Atreus, and they defeat Baldur, in turn becoming an enemy of the Norse gods, and setting Ragnarök in motion. They then try to prevent Ragnarök, but after discovering that it is only destined to destroy Asgard, they in turn see it through, defeating Odin in the process. Following the destruction of Asgard and Odin's death, Kratos, along with Freya and Mímir, set out to rebuild and restore peace to the nine realms, while Atreus goes off on his own to find any surviving giants. After going through several trials in Valhalla and with Týr's counseling via sparring sessions, Kratos makes peace with his past and joins Freya's council as the new Norse God of War so that he can be a god of hope.

The character was originally voiced by Terrence C. Carson; his final portrayal of the character was in 2013's Ascension until he returned to voice the character and provide narration for God of War Sons of Sparta (2026). Christopher Judge replaced TC Carson in 2018's God of War. Antony Del Rio voiced the character as a child in Ghost of Sparta (2010) and reprised the role in Sons of Sparta.

=== Athena ===
Athena was the Goddess of Wisdom and Kratos' mentor and ally throughout the Greek era in the series, and is revealed to be his older half-sister. In Chains of Olympus, Athena initially tasked Kratos to find Helios as in the absence of light, the god Morpheus had caused many of the gods to fall into a deep slumber. In God of War (2005), she gave Kratos the mission of killing Ares, as Zeus had forbidden divine involvement, and was instrumental in allowing Kratos to become the new God of War. Although she begged Kratos to stop his second quest for the Ambrosia of Asclepius in the comic series (2010–11) and lied to him about his brother Deimos in Ghost of Sparta, Athena was still sympathetic towards Kratos even after he renounced the gods and was betrayed by Zeus in God of War II. Athena died trying to protect Zeus from Kratos, and became a spirit in God of War III. With ulterior motives, Athena became Kratos' ally once more and guided him to the Flame of Olympus surrounding Pandora's Box, which allowed Kratos to kill Zeus and end the reign of Mount Olympus. Afterwards, Athena appeared to him and told him he has the power of hope, imbued when he originally opened the Box in God of War (2005), and demanded that he should give her the power so she could rule humanity as its sole goddess. Kratos stabbed himself to release it instead to the whole world, leaving Athena enraged and disappointed at him, leaving the latter to seemingly die. Her spirit later returns to Kratos in God of War (2018) to taunt him about his past that he had kept secret from his son Atreus. As he was retrieving his old weapons, the Blades of Chaos, she said he was nothing more than a monster, to which Kratos replied that he was not her monster anymore.

The character was voiced by Carole Ruggier in 2005's God of War, 2007's God of War II, and 2018's God of War. Erin Torpey voiced the character in Chains of Olympus (2008), God of War III (2010), and Ghost of Sparta (2010).

=== Gaia ===
Gaia was the mother of the Titans and embodiment of Earth. At the request of Zeus' mother Rhea, Gaia raised and protected the young Zeus to prevent Cronos from devouring him, as he had devoured his other children. When Zeus grew to manhood, he betrayed Gaia, freed his siblings, and Gaia was banished with her fellow Titans at the conclusion of the Great War. In God of War II, she saved Kratos from the Underworld after a disastrous encounter with Zeus, and directed the Spartan to find the Sisters of Fate in order to take revenge on Zeus. A successful Kratos plucked Gaia and the Titans from the moment in time before their defeat in the Great War to launch an attack on Olympus. In God of War III, Gaia was wounded in the assault on Olympus and abandoned Kratos, stating he was a pawn of the Titans so that they could have their own revenge. Kratos eventually found and crippled Gaia, but she returned and interrupted the final battle between the Spartan and Zeus. The pair entered Gaia's neck wound, and with the Blade of Olympus, Kratos destroyed her heart, killing the Titan.

The character was voiced by Linda Hunt in God of War II, where Gaia was also the narrator during cut scenes. Susan Blakeslee took over the role of Gaia in God of War III but not as the narrator, as Hunt retained that role.

=== Zeus ===
Zeus was the King of the Olympian Gods and the overarching antagonist of the Greek era of the series. Zeus and Ares believed the destruction of Olympus would come at the hands of Kratos' brother Deimos, so they had Deimos imprisoned and tortured by Thanatos. Many years later, in God of War (2005), Zeus aided Kratos against Ares by bestowing him with the magic, "Zeus' Fury", and as the mysterious gravedigger. In Ghost of Sparta, Zeus realizes Kratos was the prophesied Marked Warrior, not Deimos. In God of War II, it is revealed that Zeus had become infected with fear. He tricked Kratos into draining his godly powers into the Blade of Olympus, stating it was required to deal with the new threat actually created by Zeus. Kratos, stripped of his power, was mortally wounded while human, and killed by Zeus. With the help of the Titan Gaia, Kratos used the power of the Sisters of Fate to return to the moment Zeus betrayed him and defeated Zeus after extensive combat. Zeus was saved by Athena, who sacrificed herself to preserve Olympus. Before dying, Athena revealed that Kratos was Zeus' son, and that Zeus feared a perpetuation of the son-killing-father cycle, as Zeus imprisoned his father Cronos. This was confirmed in God of War III when Kratos discovered that Zeus was infected with fear when Kratos first opened Pandora's Box and used its power to kill Ares. After a lengthy battle and an enlightening encounter with Pandora in his psyche, Kratos finally overcame and killed Zeus. Later in God of War (2018), Zeus appears as a haunting vision to Kratos while in Helheim.

The character was originally voiced by Paul Eiding in 2005's God of War. Corey Burton, who had previously voiced Zeus in the animated Disney show based on the film Hercules, took over the role in God of War II. He continued the role in God of War III, in the multiplayer mode of Ascension, where Zeus appears as one of the four gods that players can pledge their allegiance to, and in 2018's God of War. Fred Tatasciore provided Zeus's voice in Ghost of Sparta's after-game "Combat Arena" mode.

Zeus, as he appears in God of War III, is a playable character in PlayStation All-Stars Battle Royale (2012); he was released as downloadable content (DLC) on March 19, 2013.

=== Atreus ===
Atreus (/əˈtreɪ.əs/ ə-TRAY-əs) is the son of Kratos and the giant named Faye. From a young age, he was sheltered from both of his parents' pasts, not knowing he was half giant, one quarter god, and one quarter mortal, which resulted in him being sickly. In his early years, he spent the majority of his time with his mother, and had not bonded closely with Kratos until her death. Faye had foreseen her own death before Atreus' birth, and asked Kratos to spread her ashes at the highest peak in all the nine realms. Atreus favored his mother in nature, having the ability to telepathically connect with animals and other creatures, which made him a very compassionate individual, but he also uniquely always showed an unnatural ability to decipher runes and speak languages that were previously unheard and unseen by him. Before her death, Faye taught him archery, how to read, and how to perform magic while his father taught him how to hunt.

After his mother's death from an unknown cause at the start of God of War (2018), he and Kratos are visited by a mysterious stranger, who is later revealed to be the Norse god Baldur sent by Odin to kill Faye, unbeknownst that she was already dead. Kratos fights Baldur and seemingly kills him to protect his son and home. Afterward, Atreus and Kratos venture from their home to fulfill Faye's final wish of having her ashes spread. Their relationship is strained at the start, with Atreus struggling to adequately appease Kratos' high standards, while also struggling to bond with his demanding father. This is only exacerbated by the fact that Kratos coldly offers little comfort to the grieving boy as he too struggles to mourn the loss of Faye. During their journey, Atreus falls ill due to his godhood fighting to reveal itself, which forces Kratos to acknowledge that he had not supported the boy in the best way he could as a father. Desperate to save his son from the nature he had kept from him, Kratos travels to Helheim to retrieve an item to heal him. After Atreus is cured, Kratos finally reveals the truth to him that they are both gods. This new knowledge of godhood corrupts Atreus, which turns Atreus rebellious and murderous. This leads to him to murder the son of Thor, Modi, against Kratos' wishes. Kratos is eventually able to reel Atreus in and make him understand that discipline is vital to godhood, and the two unite as father and son to face Baldur, who had not actually died during his and Kratos' first fight. After Baldur's final defeat, Kratos reveals his full past as a once-vengeful god, and tells Atreus that they must do better, and learn from the mistakes of their predecessors. The two then finish the journey to go to Jötunheim. There, they learn of Faye's truth of being the last giant in Midgard. It was also revealed that Faye had foreseen the entire journey him and Kratos took, and originally called him Loki to the rest of the giants, but Kratos had chosen the name Atreus, a name of an honorable Spartan comrade of his. The two then spread her ashes at Jötunheim's peak before going home. Atreus then has a vision that years later, at the end of Fimbulwinter, Thor will come for them.

Due to Baldur's death, Fimbulwinter began much sooner than prophesized, setting Ragnarök in motion. During the three-year Fimbulwinter, Atreus learns magical abilities, but still cannot fully control them. He was rigorously trained by Kratos during this time much to his frustration, though he remained unaware of why Kratos did it as the latter had foreseen his possible demise in the mural during their visit to Jotunheim, which Kratos only revealed to him later on. He also secretly meets with Sindri to find the god Týr and prevent Ragnarök. This causes a falling out between him and Kratos. Atreus is eventually magically transported to Jötunheim and meeting a giant named Angrboda where he learns more about the giants and his destiny as Loki (by which name he introduces himself to all in those realms). After making amends with his father and they learn the truth about Ragnarök, they see it through, defeating Odin as Asgard is destroyed. Atreus then decides to go off on his own and find any surviving giants, parting ways with his father.

He was voiced by Sunny Suljic.

=== Mímir ===
Mímir is a former adviser to Odin and claims to be the smartest man alive. Formerly known as the fairy Puck, Mímir migrated from the Celtic world to the Norse world to serve Odin. He became Odin's advisor, enabling his ambitions, until Mímir's peaceful intentions misaligned with Odin's desire for control, resulting in the former's imprisonment for over a hundred years. When Kratos and Atreus encounter him, believing they had reached their goal, Mímir reveals that their goal is actually in Jötunheim and that he can help them get there. He asks Kratos to behead him and have his head reanimated by the Witch of the Woods, revealed by Mímir to be the goddess Freya. After that is done, Mímir then joins Kratos and Atreus on their journey while clipped to Kratos' belt and provides information about the world and the gods through his tales. He returns in Ragnarök, continuing to serve as their counsel, but now regarded as an honorary family member. In Ragnarök's DLC Valhalla, Mímir opens up about his romantic feelings and his relationship with the Valkyrie Sigrun, but also his insecurities of not having a body.

The character was voiced by Alastair Duncan.

=== Freya ===
Freya is the Vanir Goddess of Love and former Queen of the Valkyries, and later becomes the Queen of the Realms. She was previously in an abusive marriage to Odin, who mockingly gave her the nickname Frigg, and is the mother of Baldur and the twin sister of Freyr. Odin banished her to Midgard for her betrayal as she tried to leave him for his abuse and his countless acts of cruelty against the giants. He also stripped her of her Valkyrie wings and cast a spell on her that prevented her from causing harm to any being and prevented her from leaving Midgard. She first encounters Kratos and Atreus in 2018's God of War as a supporting ally after Atreus had shot her friend, the boar Hildisvíni, for "target practice". The two then aid Freya in healing Hildisvíni. She then aided Kratos and Atreus on their journey under the alias, the Witch of the Woods. After her identity was revealed by Mímir, Kratos distrusted her because of his distrust of gods in general. While in Helheim, they learn that she is the mother of Baldur and of the spell she cast on him. She was willing to die for Baldur, even if it meant that Baldur was the one who killed her. After the spell was broken by Atreus, Freya joined the battle between Kratos, Atreus, and Mímir against Baldur by resurrecting the giant Thamur, however, Freya is downed by Jörmungandr and Baldur is defeated. Kratos gave him a chance to retreat, but Baldur instead tried to kill Freya, so Kratos killed Baldur to end the patricide cycle. A grieving Freya then vowed revenge on Kratos for killing her son and taunted him for not revealing his past to Atreus.

She returns in Ragnarök, at first as an antagonist, seeking vengeance against Kratos for Baldur's death and attacking him and Atreus throughout Fimbulwinter. After retrieving her Valkyrie wings again and coming to blows with the two, she decides to spare Kratos so she can use him to remove the spell binding her to Midgard. Kratos manages to make her empathize with him in their pain of losing children and offers forgiveness, and Freya decides to ally with Kratos again after agreeing Odin is their real enemy. After being freed of the spell and reuniting with Freyr, she ultimately joins the group in attacking Asgard in Ragnarök, finally killing Odin and freeing the realms from his control. She later joins Kratos and Mímir in bringing peace to the realms and reclaims her role as Valkyrie Queen after defeating Gná. In Ragnarök's DLC Valhalla, it is revealed that Freya had become the Queen of the Realms and invited Kratos to join her council as an advisor and the new Norse God of War, but Kratos was reluctant due to his abuse of power as the Greek God of War; however, Kratos eventually agrees to join after overcoming Valhalla's trials and making peace with his past.

The character was voiced by Danielle Bisutti.

=== Odin ===
Odin was the ruler of Asgard, the All-Father of the Nine Realms, the father of Thor and Baldur, and the overarching antagonist of the Norse era of the series. An unseen character but perpetrator of the events in 2018's God of War, he is referenced several times and is portrayed to be a cruel, tyrannical, deceitful, and manipulative god who is obsessed with preventing his death at Ragnarök. It was told that he had the god Týr killed as he thought he was going to aid the giants and overthrow him. His ravens, called the Eyes of Odin, are scattered across the realms. Odin was mentioned to have imprisoned Mímir in a tree and tortured him daily, banished his wife Freya from Asgard for 'betraying' him, and instructed Baldur to target Kratos in order to get to Faye.

Odin appears in Ragnarök as the game's main antagonist. After failing to broker peace with Kratos, he then proposes to Atreus for an apprenticeship under his wing before departing. Odin attempted to spy on Kratos, Atreus, and Mímir's activities by posing as Týr, with his guise being a trapped man in Svartalfheim who had become a traumatized and delusional coward. After a fight with his father, Atreus accepts Odin's offer in Asgard, hoping to help Odin find a way to prevent Ragnarök. Odin shows him around Asgard and introduces him to his family before sharing that he needs his help to make a magical mask to see a rift between realms that would grant infinite knowledge to prevent Ragnarök. Atreus' interactions with Odin's family reveals the effects of the All-father's neglect towards his own kin in pursuit of his own selfish agenda. Eventually, Brok blows his cover as Týr and he kills the dwarf before fleeing, which pushes Kratos' group to initiate Ragnarök instead of preventing it. Odin's true nature is revealed to his followers and family during Ragnarök by his use of Midgardian refugees as human shields, which leads to Sif and Thrúd defecting and Odin killing Thor after his son had a change of heart. After a lengthy battle against Kratos, Atreus, and Freya, during which Atreus destroys the mask, Odin is defeated and his soul was absorbed in a stone by Atreus. The stone is then destroyed by Sindri as revenge for his brother's death, freeing the Realms from Odin's grasp.

The character was voiced by Richard Schiff.

== Gods ==
=== Greek ===
- Aphrodite – The Goddess of Love and Sexuality, and widow of Hephaestus. In God of War (2005), Aphrodite helped Kratos by empowering the head of the slain Medusa and giving it to Kratos as a magical weapon. In God of War III, indifferent to Kratos' war against Olympus, she offered advice regarding the architect Daedalus. After seducing Kratos, Aphrodite directed him to her estranged husband. She is the only god that Kratos did not kill that was present in God of War III. This was also her final appearance, leaving her fate after the events of the game unknown. The character was voiced by Carole Ruggier in 2005's God of War, and April Stewart in God of War III.

Artwork of Ares, former God of War and main antagonist of the original God of War.

- Ares – The former God of War and main antagonist of 2005's God of War. Ares captured Kratos' brother Deimos and had him imprisoned and tortured due to a misinterpreted prophecy, and later chose Kratos as his champion during a successful wager with other Olympian Gods in the God of War comic series (2010–11). Early on, Ares wanted to overthrow Zeus and entered into an alliance with the Furies to help him do so. Years later, as he deemed his own son Orkos unworthy, Ares saw an opportunity to create a warrior to help him. During a battle, Kratos called on the God of War, and pledged his life in servitude if Ares spared him from his foes and provided the power to destroy them. Ares granted Kratos' wish and empowered his new servant with the Blades of Chaos. A victorious Kratos eventually renounced his servitude to Ares when the god tricked Kratos into accidentally killing his own wife and child. In God of War (2005), while Ares waged war on the city of Athens, Kratos was tasked by Athena to find Pandora's Box, an artifact capable of destroying Ares. Ultimately successful, Kratos ascended to Mount Olympus and replaced Ares as the new God of War. In Ascension's multiplayer mode, Ares is one of the four gods that players can pledge their allegiance to. The character was voiced by Steven Blum in God of War (2005), Ghost of Sparta, and Ascension. Fred Tatasciore provided Ares' voice in God of War III during the psyche sequence.
- Artemis – The Goddess of the Hunt. Artemis participated in the Olympian wager in the God of War comic series (2010–11) where her champion was Pothia. Years later in God of War (2005), she aided Kratos in the Temple of Pandora by providing him with the "Blade of Artemis" which was the same blade that she used to slay a Titan. This was her last appearance, leaving her fate unknown. The character was voiced by Claudia Black in 2005's God of War.
- Eos – The Goddess of Dawn and the sister of Helios. In Chains of Olympus, Eos told Kratos of the machinations of Morpheus, who had taken advantage of her brother's disappearance. When Kratos found Eos in the Caves of Olympus, she advised him to find the Primordial Fires and free Helios' loyal Fire Steeds, as they could find the Sun God. She also provided him with the magical ability, Light of Dawn. This was her only appearance, leaving her fate unknown. The character was voiced by Erin Torpey.
- Hades – The former God of the Underworld. Hades participated in the Olympian wager in the God of War comic series (2010–11) and his champion was Alrik, who would later become the Barbarian King. In God of War (2005), Hades aided Kratos in Pandora's Temple by giving him the magic, Army of Hades. However, with the combined murders of Hades' wife Persephone, niece Athena, and brother Poseidon, it drove him to near madness and a final confrontation with Kratos in God of War III, ending with Kratos taking Hades' weapon, the Claws of Hades, and killing the god, which subsequently released all souls from the Underworld. In Ascension's multiplayer mode, Hades is one of the four gods that players can pledge their allegiance to. The character was voiced by Nolan North in God of War (2005), Clancy Brown in God of War III, and Fred Tatasciore in Ascension. In PlayStation All-Stars Battle Royale, Hades appears as an environmental hazard on the God of War/Patapon inspired stage called "Hades".
- Helios – The former God of the Sun. Helios had entered into Ares' wager, choosing the fiery-being Cereyon, who was drowned by Kratos in the God of War comic series (2010–11). Years later, in Chains of Olympus, Helios was kidnapped by the Titan Atlas on behalf of the goddess Persephone, who intended to use Helios' power to destroy the Pillar of the World, causing the destruction of Olympus. The plan was thwarted by Kratos, and Helios was rescued. When Kratos turned against the gods and lead the Titans in an assault against Olympus in God of War III, Helios was injured and left for dead by the Titan Perses. Found by Kratos, Helios remained loyal to Zeus and attempted to trick Kratos, but was manually decapitated by the Spartan, which caused worldwide darkness and storms. The Head of Helios became a weapon for Kratos, using it to cast a blinding light and reveal hidden doorways. In Ragnarök's expansion pack, Valhalla, an illusion of Helios' head appears and swaps places with Mímir's head while Kratos is in the upper levels of Valhalla. Helios taunts Kratos throughout his journey in Valhalla, although he is forced by Kratos to assist him in battle. Kratos revealed that he regretted killing Helios, and he had only done so because he needed his power. The character was voiced by Dwight Schultz in Chains of Olympus, and by Crispin Freeman in God of War III and Valhalla.
- Hephaestus – The former Smith God and husband of Aphrodite who had fallen from the grace of Olympus. In God of War III, it is revealed that Hephaestus was the creator of Pandora and Pandora's Box, and he concealed the truth about his artificial "daughter" from Zeus, advising that the Box should be stored in an impregnable temple on the back of Cronos instead of in the Flame of Olympus. When Kratos eventually penetrated the temple and opened the Box, it released previously trapped evils into the world. Infected by fear, Zeus beat and deformed Hephaestus as punishment for his deception before trapping him in his forge in the Underworld. Kratos encountered Hephaestus in his quest to find the Flame of Olympus and eventually found Pandora, the key to quenching the flame and opening Pandora's Box. Hephaestus, seeking to protect Pandora, betrayed Kratos by sending him into what he had hoped to be a fatal confrontation with the Titan Cronos for the Omphalos Stone, but a triumphant Kratos returned with the stone, angered at Hephaestus. The surprised god then crafted the stone into a weapon for Kratos before attempting to kill the Spartan himself, but was killed by Kratos, who took the newly forged weapon, the Nemesis Whip. In Valhalla, Kratos reveals that he did not hold any ill will towards Hephaestus, understanding his actions because he could relate to it as a father. The character was voiced by Rip Torn.
- Hera – Zeus' jaded wife and former Queen of the Gods. In Betrayal, Hera's giant pet Argos was sent by the Gods to stop Kratos' rampage across Greece. Later in God of War III, the drunken goddess ordered the demigod Hercules to kill Kratos, but Kratos killed Hercules. When encountered in her gardens, a drunken Hera insulted Pandora, resulting in Kratos killing her, which ended all plant life. The character was voiced by Adrienne Barbeau in God of War III.
- Hermes – The former God of Speed and Commerce, the Messenger of the Gods, and the father of Ceryx. Hermes participated in the Olympian wager in the God of War comic series (2010–11) by choosing Danaus to be his champion. In God of War III, Hermes taunted Kratos about murdering his family during Kratos' assault on Mount Olympus, leading to a chase through the city of Olympia. Kratos eventually caught Hermes off guard, killed him, which released a plague on the world, and took the Boots of Hermes as his own. The character was voiced by Greg Ellis in God of War III.
- Morpheus – The God of Dreams and the silent ally of the goddess Persephone in Chains of Olympus. After Helios was taken from the sky by Atlas, which plunged the world into darkness, Morpheus forced both gods and mortals to slumber as his black fog covered the lands. An unseen character, Morpheus retreated into the shadows when Kratos killed Persephone, imprisoned the Titan Atlas, and returned Helios to the sky. Aside from an armor inspired by Morpheus in Ascension's multiplayer mode, this was Morpheus's only role in the series, leaving his fate unknown.
- Persephone – The former Queen of the Underworld and main antagonist of Chains of Olympus. Bitter at being abandoned to the Underworld by her fellow gods, Persephone entered into an alliance with Morpheus and then freed and used the Titan Atlas to capture the god Helios, intending to use Helios' power to destroy the Pillar of the World. Persephone offered to reunite Kratos with his daughter Calliope in the Fields of Elysium. This she did, but Kratos reluctantly abandoned Calliope and killed Persephone to stop her from destroying the Pillar, which would have in turn destroyed the Fields of Elysium and Calliope with it. In God of War III, Persephone's remains were seen in a tree casket in Hades' palace and her voice was heard in Kratos' psyche. The character was voiced by Marina Gordon in Chains of Olympus.
- Poseidon – The former God of the Sea. Poseidon also participated in the Olympian wager in the God of War comic series (2010–11) by choosing Herodius as his champion. Herodius was killed by Kratos, causing Poseidon to release his hippocampus (mythology) to destroy Kratos' ship, but Kratos and his men managed to escape. After becoming the champion of the gods, Poseidon later tasked Kratos with slaying the Hydra in God of War (2005) and granted him the magic, Poseidon's Rage. Poseidon came to resent Kratos for his role in the destruction of Atlantis in Ghost of Sparta, and, in God of War III, he was killed by Kratos during the Spartan's assault on Olympus, which caused the oceans to flood all of Greece. In Ascension's multiplayer mode, Poseidon is one of the four gods that players can pledge their allegiance to. The character was originally voiced by Fred Tatasciore in 2005's God of War. Gideon Emery took over the role in God of War III, and continued it in Ghost of Sparta and Ascension.
- Thanatos – The former God of Death, father of Erinys, and main antagonist of Ghost of Sparta. Ruler of the Domain of Death, Thanatos was responsible for imprisoning and torturing Kratos' brother Deimos. While Kratos and Deimos were battling, Thanatos snatched Deimos from the battle and dropped him on the edge of a cliff. Deimos was saved by Kratos, who united with his brother to fight the God of Death, who transformed into a winged beast. Thanatos mocked Kratos for Ares' mistaken decision and eventually killed Deimos, but was killed in turn by an angered Kratos. The character was voiced by Arthur Burghardt.

=== Norse ===
- Baldur – A former Æsir god who was the son of Odin and Freya, the half-brother of Thor, uncle to Modi, Magni, and Thrúd, and the main antagonist of 2018's God of War. To protect her son from a prophecy that foretold his death, Freya cast a spell of immortality on Baldur, which also caused him to not feel pain or pleasure, causing him to resent her. Odin sent him after Kratos and Atreus to find Kratos' wife Faye, intending to prevent Ragnarök, but was unaware that she was already dead. During their final battle, Baldur was pierced with a mistletoe arrow tip that was in Atreus' quiver, which ended his immortality; mistletoe was the only thing that could break the spell, and Freya had kept it secret. Baldur was then defeated and given the chance to flee, but he attempted to kill Freya, forcing Kratos to kill him. His death was the catalyst for the beginning of Ragnarök. The character was voiced by Jeremy Davies.
- Heimdall – A former god and watchman of Asgard known as the "Herald of Ragnarök". He watched for invaders from his hut near the Bifrost Bridge and was the holder of the magical horn Gjallarhorn that when blown, would signal the start of Ragnarök and open simultaneous realm travel to Asgard. He rode atop his beast Gulltoppr and was highly loyal to Odin to a fault. He had the ability of foresight, which was advantageous in his role as watchman but resulted in his warped distrust of people due to only seeing their true nature. As a result, he was highly arrogant and extremely unpopular even among the Æsir. In Ragnarök, he immediately antagonized Atreus upon his first visit to Asgard, before being stopped by Odin. He further provoked Thrúd and Atreus during their visit to Helheim, especially when Garm was freed. He was targeted by Kratos' group not only because he held Gjallarhorn, but he was also prophesied to kill Atreus, so Kratos and Brok forged Draupnir into a spear to bypass Heimdall's foresight. He confronted Kratos in Vanaheim when he looked for the captured Freyr; his insults towards him and threats towards Atreus became his undoing as he was brutally beaten and strangled to death by Kratos. The character was voiced by Scott Porter.
- Thor – The former Æsir God of Thunder who was the son of Odin, half-brother of Baldur, husband of Sif, the father of Modi, Magni, and Thrúd, and the wielder of the magical hammer Mjölnir. Mímir told stories of occasions where Thor killed giants, and regarded the god as a brutal butcher. He first appeared in the secret ending of 2018's God of War in a vision that Atreus had where Thor appeared at their home at the end of Fimbulwinter. Thor then appeared as a major antagonist in Ragnarök, meeting Kratos and Atreus exactly as Atreus' vision had intended and battling Kratos to a stalemate. When Atreus joined Odin in Asgard, he partnered reluctantly with Thor, who threatened him but unexpectedly bonded with him as they found the pieces to Odin's mask to see through the rifts between realms. Thor was shown to also be verbally abused by his father, who fully credited Atreus for finding the mask, and with his wife Sif's encouragement, he attempted to kill Atreus before he escaped. Thor participated in the battle of Ragnarök, where he faced off against Jörmungandr and knocked it back in time with Mjölnir before battling Kratos again. Convinced by Kratos to stand down for his children's sake, Thor defied Odin, who killed Thor in front of Thrúd. The character was voiced by Ryan Hurst.
- Modi and Magni – The sons of Thor and Sif and the brothers of Thrúd. Like their father, they both could use the power of lightning, but instead of a hammer, the older of the two, Magni, used a large sword, whereas Modi used a mace and shield. They acted as Baldur's henchmen in 2018's God of War, and the two teamed up to face Kratos and Atreus, which resulted in the death of Magni while Modi fled. Modi later returned and ambushed Kratos and Atreus, and Atreus fell ill. In a fit of rage, Kratos severely hurt Modi, who again retreated. Later on, a weakened Modi returned, but was killed by an vengeful Atreus. In Valhalla, during Kratos' trials in Valhalla, he battled manifestations of Modi and Magni, recreated from his memories, and Kratos admitted his regret in the death of both. Modi was voiced by Nolan North and Magni was voiced by Troy Baker.
- Thrúd – The daughter of Thor and Sif and the sister of Modi and Magni, who dreamed of becoming a Valkyrie for Odin, whom she believed in at the time. In Ragnarök, she befriended Atreus after he came to Asgard. After her father's death by Odin's hands during Ragnarök, she decided to inherit his hammer Mjölnir and the mantle as Goddess of Thunder in his stead. The character was voiced by Mina Sundwall.
- Týr – The former Norse God of War. He constructed the temple that sits at the center of the Lake of the Nine and houses the mythical tree Yggdrasil. A peaceful God of War, he traveled to other lands and learned about their mythologies. In 2018's God of War, it was told that Odin had Týr killed as he believed Týr was secretly aiding the giants and would try to overthrow him. However, Odin instead had him imprisoned and locked away from the world. Tyr appeared in Ragnarök in which Kratos and Atreus sought his aid to prevent Ragnarök, but he was shown as cowardly and delusional with several severe hallucinations. However, this Tyr was eventually revealed to be a disguised Odin, with his cover blown by Brok. The real Týr had actually been imprisoned in an Asgardian temple that had landed in Nilfheim after Asgard's destruction in Ragnarök, where he was finally freed by Kratos, Mímir, and Freya and left to roam the realms. He stepped down as the Norse God of War, but in Valhalla, he invited Kratos to Valhalla to go through trials in order to confront his past, and after several sparring sessions, Kratos makes peace with his past and becomes the new Norse God of War on Freya's council. The character was voiced by Ben Prendergast.
- Sif – A golden-haired goddess who appears in Ragnarök. She is Thor's wife and the mother of Thrúd, Modi, and Magni. She constantly wanted Thor to stand up to Odin, as well as for Thor to take revenge on Atreus and Kratos for killing Magni and Modi. Both she and Thrúd defected from Odin after learning that he was using Midgardian refugees as shields in Ragnarök. After Asgard's destruction, she relocates to Vanaheim to build peace between the Æsir and Vanir. The character was voiced by Emily Rose.
- Freyr – A god who was the twin brother of Freya and wielder of the magical floating sword Ingrid, which Odin had confiscated and Atreus briefly used before returning it to Freyr in Ragnarök. He led the resistance against Odin in Vanaheim. Following Odin's death in Ragnarök, he sacrificed himself to allow everyone to escape Asgard before its complete destruction. The character was voiced by Brett Dalton.

== Titans ==
- Atlas – A four-armed Titan who was imprisoned in Tartarus after the Great War. In Chains of Olympus, Atlas was freed by the goddess Persephone and captured the god Helios on her behalf. Persephone directed Atlas to use Helios' power to destroy the Pillar of the World. Atlas, however, was chained to the weakened pillar by Kratos, and was doomed to carry the weight of the world on his shoulders forever. After Kratos defeated Persephone, Atlas mocked Kratos and his choice to defend the gods. In God of War II, Atlas and Kratos met again, and although he was initially bitter towards Kratos, Atlas decided to help him reach the Sisters of Fate, providing him with the magic, Atlas Quake, and stated that they would meet again. This would be Atlas' final appearance, however, leaving his fate unknown. The character was voiced by Michael Clarke Duncan in God of War II, and by Fred Tatasciore in Chains of Olympus.
- Cronos – The father of Zeus, Hades, Poseidon, and Hera. Cronos learned of a prophecy that foretold that one of his children would become greater than he. In an attempt to cheat fate, Cronos devoured his own children and imprisoned them in his stomach. Due to the trickery by Cronos' wife Rhea, the young child Zeus was spared the fate of his siblings, and secretly grew to manhood. Zeus freed his siblings and defeated Cronos and the Titans in the Great War. In an attempt to change his fate, Cronos offered a gift, the gigantic stone "Steeds of Time", to the Sisters of Fate, but they declined his request. He also left magic, "Cronos' Rage", in the Steeds, which Kratos acquired during his quest for the Sisters. As punishment for Cronos' role in the Great War, Zeus forced the Titan to crawl through the Desert of Lost Souls with Pandora's Temple chained to his back. In God of War III, Kratos traveled to Tartarus in search of the Omphalos Stone where he was confronted by a vengeful Cronos (who still had Pandora's Temple chained to his back). The Titan blamed Kratos for Gaia's presumed death and his imprisonment, as after Kratos penetrated the Temple and retrieved the Box in God of War (2005), a fearful Zeus cast Cronos into Tartarus. The Titan was then killed in battle by Kratos with the Blade of Olympus. The character was voiced by Lloyd Sherr in God of War II, and George Ball in God of War III.
- Perses – The volcanic Titan of Destruction featured in God of War III. Perses participated in the assault on Olympus. After mortally wounding Helios, Perses attacked Kratos, but was wounded with the Blade of Olympus and fell off the mountain. He was not seen afterwards, leaving his fate unknown.
- Prometheus – A Titan who was punished by Zeus for giving mankind the Fires of Olympus. Prometheus was made mortal, and was attacked by an eagle that ripped out and ate his liver, which regrew instantly on a daily basis. Kratos encountered Prometheus near Typhon's lair in God of War II. Prometheus was eventually freed by Kratos, died by self-immolation in fire, and his ashes empowered Kratos, giving him the ability called the Rage of the Titans. The character was voiced by Alan Oppenheimer.
- Rhea – Featured in a flashback in God of War II, Rhea is the wife of Cronos. When Cronos devoured their children in an attempt to cheat the prophecy that one of his children would become greater than him, Rhea tricked Cronos and ensured the young Zeus was hidden away and protected by Gaia. This was her only appearance, leaving her fate unknown.
- Thera – A lava-based Titan in Ghost of Sparta, Thera is an original character that does not appear in Greek mythology. Imprisoned beneath the Methana Volcano just outside the city of Atlantis, Kratos freed the Titan, gained her power (called Thera's Bane), and in addition to destroying the archimedean screws, the volcano erupted. The eruption destroyed the city, submerged it under the ocean, and caused great damage to the Island of Crete and its capital city Heraklion. This was her only appearance, leaving her fate unknown. The character was voiced by Dee Dee Rescher.
- Typhon – A Titan imprisoned within a mountain after the Great War. In God of War II, Gaia directed Kratos to Typhon for aid. When Typhon refused to help him, Kratos blinded him and stole his magical bow, Typhon's Bane. This was his only appearance, leaving his fate unknown. The character was voiced by Fred Tatasciore.

== Greek heroes ==
- Hercules – A demigod and the older half-brother of Kratos. In God of War III, Hercules sought to claim the throne of God of War after performing a thirteenth and unofficial labor: the murder of Kratos. Jealous of his half-brother, Hercules attacked Kratos, but was killed by the Spartan, who took Hercules' gauntlets, the Nemean Cestus, as his own. The character also appears as a boss in Ascension on the Forum of Hercules multiplayer map. Hercules was voiced by Kevin Sorbo, who was chosen due to his previous portrayal of the character in the television series Hercules: The Legendary Journeys (although this portrayal was done with a darker tone). Hercules was originally set to appear in God of War II and was to be voiced by Cam Clarke, but the character was cut early in the game's development and only named in the credits.
- Perseus – The second Greek hero Kratos encountered in his quest to find the Sisters of Fate in God of War II. Perseus was also seeking the Sisters in the hope of reviving his dead love. Believing Kratos to be a test from the Sisters, he battled Kratos, but was killed by the Spartan. The character was voiced by Harry Hamlin, who was chosen due to his previous portrayal of the character in the 1981 film Clash of the Titans.
- Theseus – A servant of the Sisters of Fate guarding the Steeds of Time in God of War II. Theseus challenged Kratos to determine who was the greatest warrior in all of Greece, but was killed in battle. The character was voiced by Paul Eiding.

== Greek mythological characters ==
- Aegaeon – Featured in Ascension, Aegaeon the Hecatonchires had pledged a blood oath to Zeus, but later betrayed the god. The first victim of the Furies, they captured and tortured the multi-armed creature. Instead of killing him, the Furies turned him to stone, making him the giant Prison of the Damned and becoming a symbol to all who may think of breaking a blood oath to a god. As Kratos attempted to escape the prison, Megaera used her parasitic insects to bring Aegaeon to life and control him as his many arms mutated into monstrous forms and began to attack the Spartan. Fending off two of its parasite-controlled arms, Megaera then infected Aegaeon's head, which attacked Kratos, but the Spartan outsmarted and killed Megaera; this also caused Aegaeon to die, freeing him from his suffering.
- Aletheia – The former Oracle of Delphi who was gifted with prophetic sight. When she was encountered by Kratos in Ascension, she was shown to be an elderly woman who had no eyes. Castor and Pollux crushed her under rocks so that Kratos could not see her. Her dying words to Kratos told him to seek the Eyes of Truth across the sea in the Lantern of Delos—the Eyes being her own eyes that were taken by the Furies. The character was voiced by Adrienne Barbeau.
- Argos – The multi-eyed giant pet of the goddess Hera that was sent by the gods to stop Kratos' rampage across Greece in Betrayal. After several skirmishes with Kratos, Argos was killed by an unknown assassin, who was attempting to frame Kratos for the murder.
- Castor and Pollux – Featured in Ascension, they were elderly conjoined twins with Pollux being a parasitic twin that Castor normally conceals. The two usurped the Oracle of Delphi and decided who could see her. When Kratos attempted to see the Oracle without any offerings, the twins used the Amulet of Uroboros to make themselves younger to fight Kratos and were killed only after they murdered the Oracle to hinder Kratos. Castor and Pollux were voiced by David W. Collins and Brad Grusnick, respectively.
- Ceryx – The son of Hermes, a messenger of Olympus, and the main antagonist of Betrayal. He attempted to warn Kratos about the consequences of his bloody rampage across Greece, but Kratos killed him for interfering in his pursuit of the mysterious assassin.
- Charon – The former ferryman of the River Styx in the Underworld who guided lost souls to their final destination. Kratos encountered Charon on the River Styx twice in Chains of Olympus. Although he almost killed Kratos during their first encounter, Kratos returned and destroyed Charon, taking his power, Charon's Wrath. The character was voiced by Dwight Schultz.
- Circe – A witch of the island of Aeaea in the graphic novel Rise of the Warrior. Circe was recruited by the Redeemed Warrior (who became the player's multiplayer character in Ascension); she seemingly also wanted revenge against the general, who had killed the warrior's father. Circe granted the soldiers magical weapons to aid them on their journey, and suggested that they see the Oracle of Delphi to discover whether the general had any weaknesses. They eventually encounter the general, who was revealed to be the warrior's uncle and Circe's lover. Circe only aided the warrior so he would reach the general. Circe offered the warrior a choice: serve the general and his men would be spared, or kill the general and she would kill his men. The warrior then declared that he would not slay Circe and defended the lives of his men, but tricked the general into drinking from a cup that he had secretly filled with poisonous Cerberus blood, which killed the general. Circe was aghast at the warrior's vengeful act and retreated, never to be seen again.
- Daedalus – Featured in God of War III, he was a brilliant architect who constructed the labyrinth in which Pandora was imprisoned after Zeus discovered her existence. Zeus also promised to reunite Daedelus with his son Icarus as a reward, but never revealed that Icarus was already dead. Kratos, who had killed Icarus during his quest to seek the Sisters of Fate, encountered Daedalus hanging in a part of the labyrinth and the architect revealed that the labyrinth must be united to free Pandora. Daedelus was killed when Kratos united the labyrinth and he left a message in blood encouraging Kratos to get even with Zeus for him. The character was voiced by Malcolm McDowell.
- Erinys – The daughter of Thanatos featured in Ghost of Sparta. After the destruction of Atlantis, Erinys searched for Kratos, killing various Spartans as a warning for Kratos to stop his quest to find Deimos. Erinys eventually found Kratos in the Mounts of Aroania, and after a land battle, an aerial battle ensued as Erinys shape shifted into an enormous bird before being killed by Kratos, after which, Kratos took her power, the Scourge of Erinys. The character was overdub voiced by Jennifer Hale and Erin Torpey.
- The Furies – Born from drops of blood spilled during the war of the Primordials, the three Furies were the guardians of honor and enforcers of punishment. The sisters sought retribution from those who had betrayed the gods. They are the main antagonists of Ascension.
  - Megaera – The first of the three Furies, Megaera was ruthless in dealing punishment and could infect others with mutative parasites that enabled her to control them. Having lost her right arm while capturing Kratos in Delos, Megaera accidentally facilitated Kratos' freedom and died in the attempt to prevent his escape. The character was voiced by Nika Futterman.
  - Tisiphone – The second sister, she often confounded Kratos with illusions and was aided by her familiar, Daemon. Although Kratos seemingly killed her in Delos, it was an illusion. She facilitated in Kratos' capture, but was killed by the Spartan along with Alecto. The character was voiced by Debi Mae West.
  - Alecto – The former Queen of the Furies, who aligned with Ares and bore their son Orkos. The leader of the sisters, she captured Kratos and attempted to keep him imprisoned by becoming an illusion of his first wife Lysandra. Despite morphing into a giant sea monster, she was ultimately killed by Kratos. The character was voiced by Jennifer Hale.
- Gorgon Sisters – The three Gorgons who lead the race of Gorgons.
  - Medusa – The former Queen of the Gorgons. She was decapitated by Kratos in God of War (2005) at the directive of Aphrodite; Kratos took her head as a weapon to turn enemies to stone.
  - Euryale – A Gorgon and former servant of the Sisters of Fate in God of War II. Euryale sought revenge against Kratos for killing her sister Medusa, but was killed and decapitated. As with Medusa, Kratos took her head to use it as a weapon to turn enemies to stone. The character was voiced by Jennifer Martin.
  - Stheno – The eldest and largest of the three sisters that appears on the "Bog of the Forgotten" multiplayer map in Ascension. Imprisoned in a stone casing at a temple in the Bog, players can partially free her and use her magic to defeat other players for a limited time. This was her only appearance, leaving her fate unknown.
- Gyges – Featured in the God of War comics #4, #5, and #6 (2010–11), he was one of the three Chaos Giants with one hundred arms and fifty heads. During Kratos' first quest for the Ambrosia of Asclepius, his battle with Cereyon burned off the hundred arms of Gyges. During Kratos' second quest, Gyges revealed that he had planned to use the Ambrosia to revive his brothers, Briareus and Cottus, and then reclaim the world, but Kratos' initial retrieval thwarted that plan. Kratos destroyed both Gyges and the Tree of Life—which contained the Ambrosia—with the Fire of Apollo.
- Icarus – The son of Daedalus, who had become insane and obsessed with finding the Sisters of Fate. In God of War II, Kratos encountered Icarus by the Great Chasm and attacked him. The two battled while falling down the chasm. Kratos eventually stripped Icarus of his wings, took them and allowed Icarus to fall to his death into the Underworld. The character was voiced by Bob Joles.
- The Judges of the Underworld – Featured in God of War III, King Minos, King Rhadamanthus, and King Aeacus were the judges of the dead. The statues of the trio held the Chain of Balance that connected Olympus to the Underworld. Kratos encountered the statues, who declared that he was not yet ready for the afterlife. Kratos later returned to the statues and destroyed the crystals behind the statues' heads in order to raise the labyrinth so that Pandora could reach Pandora's Box. King Minos, who was the only Judge to speak through his statue, was voiced by Mark Moseley. In Valhalla, the statues appear within Valhalla during Kratos' trials, but do not speak or cast any judgment.
- King Midas – Featured in Ghost of Sparta, he was a king whose touch turned anything to gold and was grief-stricken and hallucinating as he accidentally turned his daughter to gold. Kratos encountered Midas in the Mounts of Aroania where the Spartan killed him by throwing him into a lava river—turning it to gold—which created a passage for Kratos. The character was voiced by Fred Tatasciore.
- Orkos – Also known as The Giver in Rise of the Warrior, he was the keeper of oaths sworn to the gods and was the son of Ares and Alecto. In Rise of the Warrior, he followed the redeemed warrior through his journey and imprisoned him in the Prison of the Damned due to the warrior breaking his father's oath. Later in Ascension, Orkos helped Kratos by enabling him to see through illusions. He also provided Kratos with his Oath Stone, allowing Kratos to be in two places at once. Orkos revealed to Kratos of Ares and the Furies plot to overthrow Olympus, and that Ares chose Kratos to help him do so. After Kratos defeated the Furies, Orkos had Kratos to kill him to nullify the Spartan's pact with Ares, though it inadvertently led to Kratos beginning to experience his horrible nightmares. The character was voiced by Troy Baker.
- Pandora – An animated creation of Hephaestus who became like a daughter to the god, and was neither living nor dead. Pandora was imprisoned in the labyrinth by Zeus when he was infected by the fear released from Pandora's Box. In God of War III, Kratos rescued Pandora after he learned that she was the key to pacifying the Flame of Olympus that surrounded Pandora's Box. Kratos reluctantly allowed Pandora to sacrifice herself to open the Box and mourned her death, as Pandora reminded him of his deceased child Calliope. Pandora reappeared in Kratos' psyche and helped him find the power of hope locked deep inside himself, which allowed him to overcome and kill Zeus. The character was voiced by Natalie Lander.
- Peirithous – Featured in God of War III, he was a prisoner of the Underworld who possessed the Bow of Apollo and was in love with Persephone; he was imprisoned by Hades for trying to make off with her. He offered his bow to Kratos in exchange for freedom, but the uncaring Spartan ignored the offer, killed Peirithous, and took the bow anyway. The character was voiced by Simon Templeman.
- The Sisters of Fate – Featured in God of War II, they were the three sisters who controlled the fates of all mortals, gods, and Titans, and lived on the Island of Creation. All were eventually killed by Kratos when they refused to allow him to go back in time to seek revenge on Zeus, who they were loyal to. In God of War III, their voices were heard in Kratos' psyche.
  - Lakhesis – The first Sister, she was determined to deny Kratos his revenge but ended up trapped within a time mirror, which Kratos destroyed, killing her. The character was voiced by Leigh-Allyn Baker.
  - Atropos – The second Sister who concealed herself in Lakhesis's body, she attempted to alter the result of Kratos' battle with Ares. But she and Lakhesis end up being trapped within a time mirror, which Kratos destroyed, killing both. The character was voiced by Debi Mae West in God of War II, and Marina Gordon in God of War III during the psyche sequence.
  - Clotho – The final Sister who was the gigantic and grotesque keeper of the loom from which the threads of all Greek life were spun. She was killed by Kratos when she attempted to stop him when he entered the loom's chamber. The character was voiced by Susan Silo in God of War II, and Marina Gordon in God of War III during the psyche sequence.

== Norse mythological characters ==
- Hildisvíni – A Vanir archer who is Freya's advisor. He originally appeared as a boar in God of War (2018), which Atreus accidentally shot for "target practice", with Atreus and Kratos subsequently helping Freya heal him. He returned in Ragnarök in his human form and helped fight against Odin's forces in Vanaheim and in Asgard during Ragnarök. The character was voiced by James C. Mathis III.
- The Norns – Featured in Ragnarök, the three sisters are the Fates of Norse mythology. They tell Kratos of a prophecy that involved Heimdall killing Atreus.
  - Urð – The Norn associated with the past. The character was voiced by Kate Miller.
  - Verðandi – The Norn associated with the present. The character was voiced by Emily O'Brien.
  - Skuld – The Norn associated with the future. The character was voiced by Shelby Young.
- Ratatoskr – A supernatural talking squirrel that tends to the mythical tree Yggdrassil. The character first appeared in God of War (2018) as a spirit that could be summoned by Atreus and displayed a nasty disposition. The real Ratatoskr appears in Ragnarök, who reveals that the spirit from the previous game was Bitter, one of his spectral aspects. Ratatoskr provides seeds of Yggdrassil to Kratos to help them travel across the Nine Realms. Troy Baker voiced the spectral aspect Ratatoskr in 2018's God of War, while SungWon Cho voiced the real Ratatoskr in Ragnarök.

=== Dwarves ===
- Durlin – A dwarf alchemist in Ragnarök who is friends to the Huldra Brothers and resides in Svartalfheim. The character was voiced by Usman Ally.
- Huldra Brothers – Brok and Sindri were two famous dwarf blacksmiths, first appearing in 2018's God of War. Their weapons were used by the Æsir gods, including Thor's hammer Mjölnir, and they were responsible for forging Kratos' Leviathan Axe, which they had originally forged for his wife Faye. Brok was rude and blunt, opposite to Sindri's politeness. Sindri was also obsessed with cleanliness, a Vanir having explained germ theory to him and instilling a deep phobia of contamination. When in their forges, Brok and Sindri could improve the weapons and equipment of Kratos as long as they had the necessary materials. They were first encountered separately, with disparaging things to say about one another, before eventually reuniting where they made amends and worked together. They returned in Ragnarök, where they offered their home in the realm between realms as a secret hideout. Sindri helped Atreus find Tyr in secret, while Brok managed to forge the Draupnir Spear for Kratos to fight Heimdall with. Brok realized, however, he had died accidentally by Sindri and had been resurrected by him as a soulless being. Brok was later killed by Odin, having been disguising himself as Tyr to the group, and Sindri abandoned the group after blaming them for his death. Sindri reluctantly joins the group again for Ragnarök, but goes alone to prevent any more dwarven deaths. He managed to destroy a weakness in Asgard's walls, and ultimately killed Odin when he was trapped in a spiritual stone by Atreus. He then joined a funeral for his brother in Svartalfheim but left without acknowledging the others, still bitter at them. The loss of his brother and bitterness towards the others also seemingly got him over his germophobia. Brok was voiced by Robert Craighead while Sindri was voiced by Adam J. Harrington.
- Lunda – A female dwarf blacksmith featured in Ragnarök. After Brok was killed and Sindri abandoned the group, she became the primary blacksmith in charge of the group's upgrades and equipment. The character was voiced by Milana Vayntrub.
- Ræb – Featured in Ragnarök, he is a dwarf musician in Svartalfheim. The character was voiced by Bear McCreary, the music composer for God of War (2018), Ragnarök, and Valhalla.

=== Jötunn ===
The Jötnar, referred to as giants, are a race of Norse giants. Among the known giants are:

- Angrboða – One of the last remaining giants who appears in Ragnarök. She meet Atreus after magically transported to Jötunheim and aided him in learning of his destiny as Loki. She also provided assistance during Ragnarök and helped the group escape Asgard before its destruction. The character was voiced by Laya DeLeon Hayes.
- Grýla – Featured in Ragnarök, she is Angrboða's short-tempered grandmother who stole souls of animals to experience their memories. The character was voiced by Debra Wilson.
- Hræsvelgr – A giant and ruler of Helheim who is in the form of a giant eagle and currently has the mantle of Hel. Hræsvelgr's large wings conjure up large, freezing winds in Helheim. Initially a passive character in 2018's God of War, Hræsvelgr later appears in Ragnarök to chastise Atreus for setting Garm free and causing rifts, and later denies thanks to Kratos, Mímir, Atreus, or Freya once the rifts are closed. Mímir and Hildisvíni manage to convince Hræsvelgr to send armies of Hel during Ragnarök in exchange for the promise that someone would replace her as Hel so she could retire. The character was voiced by Molly Scarpine, who was uncredited for the role.
- Jörmungandr – The World Serpent, who, in 2018's God of War, was believed to be the last remaining giant in Midgard and is so large that he wraps around the world. He speaks giant, the language of the giants that only Mímir can understand and provided assistance to Kratos and Atreus. He hated the Æsir gods, in particular Thor, which was made evident when he swallowed a statue of the god which unknowingly contained Mímir's missing eye, to which Kratos and Atreus had to go inside Jörmungandr's belly to retrieve. Mímir revealed that Jörmungandr had already experienced the end of Ragnarök and his battle with Thor, but was sent back in time. During Kratos and Atreus' battle with Baldur, Jörmungandr aided them and fended off the reanimated corpse of Thamur. In Ragnarök, Jörmungandr was hibernating during Fimbulwinter, but was awoken by Atreus. The giant advised him to go to the giant region of Ironwood. After being brought there by Angrboda, Atreus learned of soul magic and transferred the soul of a giant to the body of a dead snake, which later became Jörmungandr. The younger Jörmungandr then joined the siege of Asgard, where he battled Thor before he was knocked back in time. Following the destruction of Asgard, Kratos, Freya, and Mímir deduce that the legends were true and that the young Jörmungandr was knocked back in time while the current Jörmungandr is still present in Midgard. The character was voiced by Mike Niederquell.
- Laufey – Kratos's second wife, who he referred to as Faye, and Atreus' mother. She was one of the few remaining giants in Midgard who concealed her true nature from everyone. Upon giving birth to Atreus, Faye made him his bow and had Kratos teach him to hunt when he came of age. She also gifted Kratos his Guardian Shield. Just prior to the start of 2018's God of War, Faye died of an unknown cause and Kratos cremated her body on a funeral pyre, as her last wish was for her ashes to be spread at the highest peak of the nine realms, eventually revealed to be in Jötunheim, where the two learned who Faye really was and that she and the giants knew of everything that would happen. It was also learned that she had already walked the path of Kratos and Atreus' journey, and left clues behind to help them so that they would complete their journey. Faye appeared in Kratos' dreams in Ragnarök, where it was shown how she prepared Kratos for her death. The character is voiced by Deborah Ann Woll.
- Surtr – Featured in Ragnarök, he was a primordial fire giant that lived in Muspelheim, and Sinmara's lover. Kratos and Atreus sought him out to help wage war against Odin, helping him transform into the apocalyptic giant that was prophesied to destroy Asgard in Ragnarök, which he ultimately does. He was left laying waste to Asgard as the group fled, leaving his fate unknown. The character was voiced by Chris Browning.
- Thamur – A stonemason giant who attempted to build a wall around Jötunheim to protect the giants against Thor in the war between the giants and the gods. He eventually battled with Thor, who killed the giant. During God of War (2018), Kratos and Atreus journey to the giant's corpse to retrieve a piece of his chisel, needed to get through certain blocked doorways. Later during the final fight with Baldur, Freya reanimated Thamur's corpse to try and stop the fight, but was unsuccessful when Jörmungandr appeared and attacked the reanimated giant. Thamur is loosely based on an unnamed stonemason giant in Norse mythology, who attempted to build a wall around Asgard to protect the realm, but ended up being killed by Thor due to the machinations of Loki.

=== Valkyries ===
The Valkyries are female warriors who are responsible for taking warriors to Valhalla upon their death in the mortal realm. Due to Freya's betrayal, Odin cursed the nine Valkyries to remain in a physical form, an unnatural state for a Valkyrie, which drove them to insanity due to a prolonged period in that form. In 2018's God of War, Kratos and Atreus discover the Valkyries across the realms in Odin's hidden chambers. Upon killing their physical form, their spirits were freed from Odin's curse and returned to Valhalla. Some of these Valkyries were resurrected as shield maidens and returned in Ragnarök as allies, while new Valkyries appeared as foes.

- Eir – The Healer, Eir was a quiet and calm Valkyrie. She healed the wounds of both mortals and gods. She was found in a hidden chamber in Midgard in God of War (2018). Initially taught by her father in the ways of herbal medicine, she rejected her father's teachings in lieu of magic healing after he died from an unknown illness. When the same illness struck her new teacher, she healed her with a combination of herbal and magic healing, ultimately leading to her recruitment into the Valkyries. She returned in Ragnarök as a resurrected shield maiden who allied with Kratos and Freya in the attack on Asgard, and ultimately survived Ragnarök. She then provided wisdom to Kratos in Valhalla. The character was voiced by Sarah Sokolovic.
- Geirdriful – The former Master of Arms in Valhalla. She was responsible for training Odin's army, the einherjar, for Ragnarök. She was found in a hidden chamber in Midgard in God of War (2018).
- Göndul – Thought of as the most stunning Valkyrie that she caused men to go insane. In God of War (2018), she was found at the top of the large volcano in Muspelheim as the sixth and final Trial of Muspelheim.
- Gná – A Valkyrie who was the Mistress of Wind and Fullness who became the Queen of the Valkyries in Ragnarök following the removal of Freya and Sigrun. She was a fellow Vanir who was previously close with Freya as her handmaiden and confidant, but their friendship crumbled when Gná decided to remain loyal to Odin. Following the destruction of Asgard, she battled Kratos and Freya in Muspelheim but was defeated, and despite an offer of forgiveness by Freya, Gná chose death instead. The character was voiced by Evanne Friedmann.
- Gunnr – The former Mistress of War, Gunnr was one of Odin's favorites and was the first on the battlefield to search for fallen men. She was violent in nature, leading to a neighborhood bully burning down the inn her father owned. Having saved her father in time, she avenged him by slaughtering the bully's gang. Sigrun was surprised at Gunnr's singlehanded victory, leading her to join the Valkyries. After Odin cursed the Valkyries, she was found in a hidden chamber in Midgard in God of War (2018). She returned in Ragnarök as a resurrected shield maiden who allied with Kratos and Freya in the attack on Asgard, and ultimately survived Ragnarök. She then provided wisdom to Kratos in Valhalla. The character was voiced by Anna Campbell.
- Hildr – The former Mistress of Battle, Hildr got along well with Odin, but not with the other Valkyries. She was found within the maze-like structure in Niflheim in God of War (2018). She returned in Ragnarök as a resurrected shield maiden who allied with Kratos and Freya in the attack on Asgard, though it is unknown if she survived Ragnarök as she was not present in Midgard after the battle. The character was voiced by Sara Cravens.
- Hrist – One of the newer appointed Valkyries in Ragnarök. Her and Mist battle Kratos and Atreus to try and prevent them from allowing Surtr to assume his giant form that would destroy Asgard, but they were defeated. The character was voiced by Erica Lindbeck.
- Kara – Although calm and collected, she could easily unleash a fury. She was found in a hidden chamber in Midgard in God of War (2018).
- Mist – One of the newer appointed Valkyries in Ragnarök. Her and Hrist battle Kratos and Atreus to try and prevent them from allowing Surtr to assume his giant form that would destroy Asgard, but they were defeated. The character was voiced by Mara Junot.
- Olrun – The daughter of a powerful chieftain, she fell protecting him and was taken to Valhalla where she was made a Valkyrie who had a pursuit for knowledge. Odin appointed her as the Valkyrie's resident historian. She was found in a hidden chamber in Alfheim in God of War (2018). She returned in Ragnarök as a resurrected shield maiden who allied with Kratos and Freya in the attack on Asgard, but is killed battling Gná.
- Róta – One of the Choosers of the Slain, she was the first to go mad after being imprisoned in a physical form. She was found in a hidden chamber in Helheim in God of War (2018), where Sigrun purposefully put her there to not harm herself or others.
- Sigrun – The acting Queen of the Valkyries in God of War (2018), she was only able to be summoned at the Council of the Valkyries once the other eight had been defeated and their helms placed on their respective thrones. A former princess in Fjöturlund, Sigrun experienced several tragedies that led to the loss of her family and her lover Helgi, which drove her to join the Valkyries as redemption. She served under the former Valkyrie Queen Freya, but after Odin stripped Freya of her wings and position, Sigrun reluctantly took the position. She and Mímir became lovers, but they were separated after both Mímir and Sigrun became trapped by Odin. After Odin cursed the Valkyries, Sigrun hid them throughout the realms before being freed by Mímir, Kratos, and Atreus. She returned in Ragnarök as a resurrected shield maiden who allied with Kratos and Freya in the attack on Asgard, where she finally reunited with Mímir and ultimately survived Ragnarök. In Valhalla, Sigrun was present when Freya and the Valkyries confronted Kratos and Mímir for entering Valhalla, though her relationship with Mímir had strained after he rejected her romantic advances. Sigrun was later penalized by Valhalla after saving Kratos and Mímir from a punishment, weakening her connection to the land, and this made her re-evaluate her desires, deciding to step back from her duties to rediscover herself through traveling the world alone, but promised to eventually return to Mímir. The character was voiced by Martha Marion in God of War (2018) and Misty Lee in Ragnarök and Valhalla.

== Original characters (comic series and video games) ==
=== Kratos' original family ===
- Calliope – Kratos' daughter. As an infant, she was stricken with the plague and was to be killed due to Sparta's law. Calliope was saved by Kratos during the comic series (2010–11) when he obtained the Ambrosia of Asclepius, but was eventually killed with her mother by Kratos during a berserker rage in a temple dedicated to Athena (shown in flashbacks in 2005's God of War). In Chains of Olympus, Kratos was briefly reunited with Calliope in the Underworld in the Fields of Elysium, but was forced to abandon her to save the world from Persephone and Atlas. In God of War III, Kratos found a note from her in the Underworld, and when Kratos entered into his psyche during his final fight with Zeus, he was spiritually reunited with both Lysandra and Calliope. The character was voiced by Debi Derryberry.
- Callisto – The mother of Kratos and Deimos, featured in Ghost of Sparta. Kratos found his ailing mother in the city of Atlantis. As she attempted to reveal the identity of Kratos' father, she was punished by Zeus and transformed into a deformed humanoid beast, which Kratos was forced to kill. Before dying, Callisto advised Kratos to find Deimos. Her body was later buried next to Deimos by the Gravedigger. Deanna Hurstold voiced the elder Callisto while Jennifer Hale voiced the younger Callisto.
- Deimos – The younger brother of Kratos, featured in Ghost of Sparta. He was kidnapped by Ares and imprisoned and tortured by Thanatos because of his unusual birthmarks, as a prophecy predicted the demise of Olympus would come at the hands of a "marked warrior". As time passed, Deimos' hatred for Kratos grew, as his hope of rescue decayed. When eventually reunited with his brother, Deimos was initially bitter for Kratos' perceived failure and the two battled. When Kratos saved Deimos from falling to his death, he joined his brother and battled Thanatos. Deimos, however, was killed by Thanatos, who was killed in turn by Kratos. The character was voiced by Elijah Wood in God of War III during the psyche sequence, and Mark Deklin as an adult and Bridger Zadina as a child in Ghost of Sparta.
- Lysandra – Kratos' first wife. Although she was responsible in granting Kratos his quest for the Ambrosia of Asclepius to save Calliope in the comic series (2010–11), she was killed along with her daughter (shown in flashbacks in 2005's God of War). After being spiritually reunited with both Lysandra and Calliope in his psyche in God of War III, Lysandra aided Kratos in forgiving himself for his crime. The character was voiced by Gwendoline Yeo in God of War (2005) and God of War III, and Jennifer Hale in Ascension as an illusion created by Alecto.

=== Other original characters ===
- Barbarian King Alrik – The former ruler of a horde of barbarians. As the champion of Hades during the comic series (2010–11), he sought the Ambrosia to save his ailing father. Alrik was ultimately unsuccessful and was killed by Kratos. Resurrected by Hades, Prince Alrik learned that he had become King after the death of his father. Alrik sought vengeance against Kratos, and his barbarian horde threatened to overwhelm Kratos' opposing Spartan army. Alrik almost killed Kratos in combat, but this was undone at the critical moment when Kratos offered up his life to Ares and was returned to battle equipped with the Blades of Chaos, which Kratos used to decapitate Alrik (shown in flashbacks in 2005's God of War). Alrik eventually fought his way out of the Underworld, and intent on revenge, found and confronted Kratos on the Island of Creation in God of War II. Kratos killed the Barbarian King once again, and took his hammer. The character was voiced by Bob Joles in God of War II, and Fred Tatasciore in God of War III during the psyche sequence.
- The Boat Captain – A humorous addition, the Boat Captain encountered Kratos on several occasions, although these were always to the Boat Captain's detriment. In God of War (2005), Kratos callously dropped him to his death when in the belly of the Hydra and took his key. He later brushed him aside in the Underworld. In God of War II, the Boat Captain fled from Kratos as a spirit even though summoned to fight him, and in God of War III, he left a note of hatred towards Kratos in the Underworld and his voice was heard in Kratos' psyche. The character was voiced by Keith Ferguson in God of War (2005) and God of War II, and Josh Keaton in God of War III during the psyche sequence. In 2018's God of War, the Boat Captain's ship somehow ended up in the Lake of the Nine in Midgard, which Kratos found via a treasure map; it mentioned the key that Kratos took from the captain and his subsequent death in the Hydra. In Ragnarök after freeing the Lyngbakr—learning that Mímir had imprisoned the whale-like sea monster—Kratos writes in his journal, remorseful of what he had done to the boat captain. In Valhalla, Kratos finds the Boat Captain's key again in his trials in Valhalla, and also has a trial upon his boat (recreated from Kratos' memories), and Kratos tells Mímir about the Boat Captain, again expressing regret for killing him and admitting how pointless his murder was.
- The Body Burner – Featured in God of War (2005), he granted Kratos passage into Pandora's Temple. The Body Burner was the first warrior to die while seeking Pandora's Box. He was cursed by the gods to continue to live as a rotting corpse and act as custodian of the Temple, where he burned the dead bodies that the harpies brought to him. The character was voiced by Christopher Corey Smith.
- Captain Nikos – Featured in the God of War comics #2, #3, and #4 (2010–11), Captain Nikos was a Spartan who Kratos met after he had slain the Hades Phoenix. Captain Nikos and his men assisted Kratos in his search for the Ambrosia of Asclepius. Nikos was injured in battle against Poseidon's champion Herodius, but survived. Hades later sent fireballs from the sky to stop the Spartan army. As a fireball was about to strike Kratos, Nikos sacrificed himself to save him. Before dying, he passed the rank of Captain to Kratos. During Kratos' second journey, Nikos' corpse, and those of other Spartans, were reanimated by Hades, but Kratos easily defeated them.
- Cereyon – Featured in God of War comic #4 (2010–11), he was the fiery champion of Helios. Although he never revealed his intent for finding the Ambrosia of Asclepius, he fought Kratos, but was drowned by the Spartan.
- Danaus – Featured in God of War comic #3 (2010–11), he was the champion of Hermes that could magically command beasts. With the animals in his village dying of a plague, Danaus was forced to seek the Ambrosia of Asclepius. He was decapitated in battle by Barbarian Prince Alrik, who retained Danaus' head as it could still command beasts.
- The Gravedigger – A mysterious figure, eventually revealed to be Zeus, that was digging a grave in the midst of a war in God of War (2005). The Gravedigger counseled Kratos and eventually rescued him from the Underworld. In Ghost of Sparta, he counseled Kratos against making enemies of the gods after Kratos partially caused the destruction of Atlantis. The Gravedigger later appeared where he buried the body of Deimos. After burying the body of Callisto, the Gravedigger quoted "Now... only one remains". The character was voiced by Paul Eiding.
- Herodius – Featured in God of War comic #4 (2010–11), Herodius was a warrior from the village of Thera. Poseidon chose Herodius as his champion in Ares' wager. His village was stricken with a plague, cast by Poseidon so that Herodius would search for the Ambrosia of Asclepius. Herodius was killed by Kratos, which did not go well for Poseidon.
- The King of Sparta – Featured in God of War comic #6 (2010–11). The King's Guard was convinced by Kratos' wife Lysandra to allow Kratos to embark on a quest for the Ambrosia of Asclepius that would restore their plague-stricken daughter, Calliope. Kratos and his men were given until the next full moon to return before the King executed his daughter. Ultimately successful, Kratos returned, saved Calliope, and gave the rest of the elixir to the King. The King then officially awarded Kratos with the rank of captain. The King of Sparta also appears as an illusion created by Tisiphone in Ascension where he honors Kratos for his service as his best general. Kratos believed what he was seeing at first until he saw Tisiphone's ring on the king's finger. He kicked Tisiphone off the balcony, dispelling her illusion. When Kratos was on the verge of victory over the Furies, Tisiphone changed into the form of the King once again, telling him that he was unworthy of being called a Spartan. The character was voiced by Crispin Freeman.
- The Last Spartan – A loyal follower of Kratos. In Ghost of Sparta, he ordered the replacement of a statue of Ares with one of Kratos and gave Kratos his former weapons, the "Arms of Sparta", which Kratos had used as Captain of the Spartan Army. In God of War II, he witnessed the destruction of Sparta at the hands of a vengeful Zeus. Thinking Kratos dead, he attempted to find the Sisters of Fate to change the fate of Sparta. He was accidentally killed by Kratos, but revealed the extent of Zeus' treachery before dying. His body is later devoured by the Kraken during Kratos' battle with it. The character was voiced by Josh Keaton in God of War II, and Gideon Emery in Ghost of Sparta.
- The Narrator – Voiced by Linda Hunt, she narrated every game of the Greek era, except Betrayal, and only provided an introductory narration for God of War III. In God of War II only, the narrator and the Titan Gaia are the same character.
- The Oracle of Athens – Featured in God of War (2005), she was an oracle that lived in Athens. Shocked at Athena's decision for choosing Kratos, the Oracle directed him to find Pandora's Box. Kratos later returned to Athens and found her mortally wounded due to Ares' war on the city. The character was voiced by Susan Blakeslee.
- The Persian King – Leader of the Persian forces that invaded the Greek city of Attica during Chains of Olympus. He was killed in battle by Kratos who confiscated his Efreet as a magical ability. The character was voiced by Fred Tatasciore.
- Pothia – Featured in God of War comic #3 (2010–11), she was the warrior-queen of an Amazonian tribe. Pothia was seeking the Ambrosia of Asclepius to make the Amazons whole again as their children were stillborn. Artemis chose Pothia as her champion, but she was ultimately killed by Kratos.
- Redeemed Warrior – The Redeemed Warrior, also referred to as the champion, was the unnamed protagonist of the graphic novel Rise of the Warrior who became the player's multiplayer character in Ascension. In Rise of the Warrior, it was shown that he was a native of Kirra whose father was killed by a general. Before dying, the warrior swore to his father that he would bring no harm to his family. The warrior then gathered soldiers of the village and sought after the general, also recruiting the witch Circe. Finding the general, he discovered that the general was actually his uncle and Circe's lover. After negotiations, the warrior tricked his uncle into drinking poisonous Cerberus blood, killing his uncle. Circe was aghast and fled. Because he killed his uncle, it broke his oath to his father. The Giver appeared, revealing himself to be Orkos, and imprisoned the warrior in the Prison of the Damned. In Ascension during Kratos' pursuit of Megaera, Kratos encountered the warrior, who was rejoiced to see an opportunity for freedom. Before being attacked by an arm of the Hecatonchires, the warrior vanished in a beam of light upon praying to the gods. This transported him to the Rotunda of Olympus. There, he started his trials for redemption to become a champion of the gods and was given a choice to either swear an allegiance to Ares, Hades, Poseidon, or Zeus. Several people were credited for the character in Ascension's multiplayer: Dave Carter, Neil Kaplan, Kevin Killebrew, Alem Brhan Sapp, Isaac C. Singleton Jr., Anthony Skordi, and Jimmie Wood.
- The Scribe of Hecatonchires – Featured in Ascension, he was the first mortal imprisoned by the Furies for breaking a blood oath to a god. To keep his sanity, he wrote meticulous records of the sisters and their schemes, which Kratos found throughout the prison. He informed Kratos that originally, although the Furies were cruel, they were fair, but became ruthless on account of Ares. The character was voiced by Robin Atkin Downes.
- Skjöldr – A young man from Midgard in Ragnarök. Odin relocated him and the other Midgardians to Asgard. He befriends Atreus while in Asgard and was eventually freed and returns to Midgard after Ragnarök. The character was voiced by A.J. LoCascio.
- Unknown Assassin – An unidentified assassin in Betrayal who framed Kratos for the murder of Argos. Kratos chased the assassin throughout Greece to discover the identity of the assassin's master, but the assassin ultimately escaped when Ceryx intervened. His fate is unknown.
- The Village Oracle – Featured in flashbacks in God of War (2005), she was a female soothsayer who attempted to warn away Kratos—still in the service of Ares—when he arrived at a village dedicated to Athena. The Village Oracle cursed Kratos once he was tricked by Ares into killing his wife and child, and proclaimed that "from this day forward, the mark of your terrible deed will be visible to all" as the ashes of Kratos' burnt family merged with his skin. This turned Kratos' skin ash-white and earned him the title, "Ghost of Sparta". The Village Oracle briefly appears as an illusion created by Tisiphone in Ascension. The character was voiced by Susan Blakeslee.

== Reception ==
The original God of War received praise for its voice acting. Chris Sell of PALGN stated that the voice acting was "up there with the best" in comparison to other games, and that the cut scenes were "superbly voiced, but it's the narrator of the story that is the most professionally convincing throughout". Kristan Reed of Eurogamer wrote, "Even the straight-laced voice work is handled with an expertise so sadly lacking in most other videogames". Raymond M. Padilla of GameSpy wrote that some of the voice acting and music tracks were overstated; one of his few dislikes in the game. Matt Leone of 1UP wrote that "There's a mixture of in-game characters that speak to you and extremely nice CG sequences that show moments such as flashbacks, and it all blends together surprisingly well".

God of War II received similar praise for its voice acting. Chris Roper of IGN said the characters were timeless and the voice acting was great. Kristan Reed said that the voice acting was "top notch." Alex Navarro of GameSpot wrote that "The voice acting is ... all-around excellent, though it's not quite as enjoyable as it was in the last game", and that "Kratos is as gruff and over the top as ever". He praised the supporting voice performances, such as Linda Hunt as Gaia and the narrator, Corey Burton as Zeus, and Harry Hamlin as Perseus, as "top-notch work". However, Navarro said that a few of the performances felt "a bit labored or overwrought. In particular, Michael Clarke Duncan as Atlas feels more wooden than imposing. The voice is right, but his performance is oddly subdued". With these exceptions, Navarro said that "this is another enjoyable voice cast". GameSpy described Kratos as a "sympathetic antihero" and Game Guru claimed "Practically anyone, even if they hadn't played any of the God of War games, would know about Kratos".

God of War III action figures produced by DC Unlimited featuring (clockwise from bottom-center) Kratos, Zeus, Hercules, and Hades

God of War III received mixed reviews; Chris Roper of IGN stated that the voice acting "could be better", and that some of the characters were the "biggest culprits" to "creating an uneven feeling in the visual presentation" and that they "don't feature the same level of lighting quality or perhaps texture work as others". Roper also said that a few look "fantastic ... but many are clearly not on the same level as Kratos, and some are even only passable as 'good'".

Chris Roper of IGN said that the voice acting on Chains of Olympus was nice. For Ghost of Sparta, Nicole Tanner of IGN wrote that it "[c]ontinues the tradition of great voice acting" that "we've come to expect from a God of War installment". Joe Juba of Game Informer said that the voice work was solid.

The Norse era games would also receive praise. Nick Plessas of Electronic Gaming Monthly said that the 2018 God of War's most memorable moments were the interactions between Kratos and Atreus. He noted, "there is often some comic relief to be found when Kratos's curtness and Atreus's charming naivety collide". He felt the presence of Atreus showed a side to Kratos not seen before, and that Kratos had evolved emotionally. He also said Atreus's character was similarly complex, and commented that it is easy for child characters "to succumb to a number of annoying child archetypes", but Atreus was more like a young man who was doing his best in an adult world. Game Informer's Joe Juba similarly praised the relationship between Kratos and Atreus, noting that Kratos conveyed more character than in any previous game. Jason Faulkner of Game Revolution wrote that, "Watching [Kratos and Atrues] grow throughout their journey is incredibly rewarding", equating it to that of Ellie and Joel from The Last of Us or Lee and Clementine from Telltale Games's The Walking Dead. Peter Brown of GameSpot felt that although Kratos and Atreus were enjoyable, it was Mímir who stole the show. He also said that regardless of which character the player met, the cast was "strong, convincing, and oddly enchanting". Writing for IGN, Simon Cardy said that Ragnarök provided fresh interpretations of well-known Norse mythological characters, and the actors gave them a unique take that was different from their popular MCU counterparts.

=== Merchandise ===
Two series of action figures based on God of War II have been produced by the National Entertainment Collectibles Association (NECA). The first set included two versions of Kratos; one wielding the Blades of Athena and the second wearing the Golden Fleece and holding a gorgon's head. The second set included a twelve-inch figure that played six game quotes. A second two-figure set was also released, with Kratos wearing the God of War armor. DC Unlimited produced a line of action figures based on God of War III, which included the characters Kratos, Zeus, Hades and Hercules. Between February 1, 2010, and March 31, 2010, 7-Eleven sold a limited edition Slurpee drink called "Kratos Fury", available in four exclusive God of War III cups, which featured codes that could be used to access God of War III and Slurpee-themed downloadable content on the Slurpee website. Kratos' visage also appeared on the PlayStation Portable Chains of Olympus exclusive bundle pack, and on the PlayStation 3 God of War III sweepstakes prize video game consoles. Other products have included artwork, clothing, and sweepstakes. Action figures from the Norse era games were also produced.
