= David Ashkenazi =

Russian composer

David Vladimirovitch Ashkenazi (Russian: Дави́д Влади́мирович Ашкена́зи; 25 December 1915 – 19 February 1997) was a Russian-Jewish pianist, accompanist, and composer.

Ashkenazi was born on 25 December 1915 in Nizhny Novgorod. He studied piano at the local music college and at the Moscow Conservatory. He worked as an accompanist with a number of celebrated Soviet pop singers, including Isabella Yuryeva, Klavdiya Shulzhenko, Lyudmila Zykina, Marina Gordon, Vadim Kozin, Mark Bernes, Iosif Kobzon and others.

He was made People's Artist of Russia in 1996.

In 1964 he and violinist Naum Latunsky performed in an episode of the film The Garnet Bracelet, which was an adaptation of the celebrated novella of the same name by Alexander Kuprin. He set to music the Yakov Polonsky's poem titled "When in a separation presentiment", and his song was covered by many singers.

David Ashkenazi was the father of the famous pianist and conductor Vladimir Ashkenazy.

He died on 19 February 1997 in Moscow, Russia.
