= Vladimir Terletsky =

Russian composer

Vladimir Terletsky (in Russian Терлецкий Владимир Евгеньевич, in Yiddish – וועלוול טערלעצקי) was a musician, composer and conductor. Terletsky (January 22, 1931 in Moscow, Soviet Union – July 22, 1998 in Moscow, Russia) studied music at the Gnesins’ Music School and College, thereafter at the Gnesins’ Institute for Music Educators. Terletsky held numerous positions as staff arranger and conductor /the orchestras of Eddie Rosner, of Moscow Variety, Rosconcert, Moscow Concerts, Baku Variety /. He was granted the title of a Distinguished Artist of the Azerbaydzhanian Soviet Socialistic Republic.

== Compositions ==
Terletsky composed numerous songs, incidental music, movie scores, music for television and radio shows. He was renowned for his mastery of music arrangements. Of his Jewish music are notable the two Jewish Suites for orchestra, songs to words of Aaron Vergelis and Elias Beyder. He arranged many Jewish folk tunes. Terletsky’s music has been recognized for melodic simplicity and liveliness, his orchestration is witted and colorful.
