= Gnesin =

Russian: Гне́син, Ukrainian: Гнесін, Hebrew: גנסין
Origin
- Languages: Slavic, Russian
- Meaning: Agnes
- Region of origin: Russia

Gnesin or Gnessin (Russian: Гнесин) is a Jewish Russian surname. People with this surname include:

- Fabian Osipovich Gnesin (1837–1891), an official rabbi of Rostov-on-Don and father of a prominent Jewish Russian family of musicians and philanthropists.
  - Sisters Gnesin:
    - Yevgeniya Savina-Gnesina (1870–1940)
    - Elena Gnesina (1874–1967)
    - Maria Gnesina (1876–1918)
    - Yelizaveta Gnesina-Vitáček (1876–1953)
    - Olga Alexandrova-Gnesina (1881–1963)
  - Mikhail Gnesin (1883–1957), Jewish Russian composer
  - Grigory Gnesin (1884–1938), singer and stage actor
- Gnesin State Musical College, Moscow
- Uri Nissan Gnessin (1879–1913), Jewish Russian writer, a pioneer in modern Hebrew literature
- Menahem Gnessin (1882–1951), Jewish Russian stage actor, younger brother of Uri Nissan Gnessin
