= Róta =

Valkyrie in Norse mythology

In Norse mythology, Róta is a valkyrie. Róta is attested in chapter 36 of the Prose Edda book Gylfaginning, where she is mentioned alongside the valkyries Gunnr and Skuld, and the three are described as "always [riding] to choose who shall be slain and to govern the killings." Otherwise, Róta appears in two kennings, one by Egill Skallagrímsson and one by Hallfreðr vandræðaskáld. Theories have been proposed about the possible appearance of Róta in Gesta Danorum and the meaning of her name.

== Theories ==
=== Name ===
According to Guðbrandur Vigfússon, the name Róta is connected to the Old Norse noun róta (meaning "sleet and storm") and Róta is "a goddess who sends storm and rain."

=== Gesta Danorum ===
In book two of Gesta Danorum, a female by the name of "Ruta" is mentioned:

Arise too, Ruta, and show your snow-pale head,
come forth from hiding and issue into battle.
The outdoor carnage beckons you; fighting now
shakes the court, harsh strife batters the gates.

Axel Olrik considered this as an isolated reference to Hrólfr Kraki's widow Hrut mourning on the battlefield with blond hair. Hilda Ellis Davidson says "it seems more probable that it is a reference to the deathly pale head of the valkyrie, the spirit brooding over the battlefield personifying slaughter, who is summoned at the outset of battle." Davidson points out that Róta is the name of a valkyrie, and that "it seems preferable to assume" this to Olrik's theory. Davidson says that while this is, however, complicated by an earlier mention in book two of Hrólfr Kraki's sister and Bödvar Bjarki's wife Hrut, yet this Hrut is not found elsewhere as a female name.

In book six of Gesta Danorum, a figure by the name of "Rothi" is mentioned:

Say, Rothi, perpetual mocker of cowards, do you think
we have made Frothi adequate restitution
by paying him seven deaths in revenge for one?
See, they are borne lifeless who gave you homage
only in show and beneath subserviance planned
treachery."

According to Davidson, this "Rothi" may be the same as Róta, though it has been alternately theorized that "Rothi" may be a name of Odin.
