= Game Audio Network Guild Awards =

Award show

- Current: 24th Annual G.A.N.G. Awards
- Game Audio Network Guild logo
- Awarded for: Excellence in video game audio
- Venue: Moscone Center
- Country: United States
- Hosted by: Game Audio Network Guild
- First award: March 7, 2004; 22 years ago
- Website: audiogang.org

The Game Audio Network Guild Awards (shortened to the G.A.N.G. Awards) is an award show for achievement in video game audio, including score, voice acting, and sound effects. The awards, which started in 2004, are arranged by the Game Audio Network Guild and held annually during the Game Developers Conference in San Francisco. The first four shows were held at the Fairmont San Jose, before moving to the Moscone Center from the fifth; due to the COVID-19 pandemic, the 18th to 20th ceremonies were held virtually.

== Format ==
The Game Audio Network Guild (G.A.N.G.) Awards are celebrated annually as part of the Game Developers Conference in San Francisco. The awards are split between music, sound design, and voice acting. Submissions must be released between January 1 and December 31 of the preceding year. Members of the Game Audio Network Guild may submit five nominations for free, with each additional submission costing US$25; public submissions cost US$75 per game. Early access games are ineligible. After the submission deadline passes, the Awards Committee sends the data to the Advisors and Awards Committees to select the nominees. Once the final nominations are selected, the Game Audio Network Guild votes for the winners.

== Ceremonies ==
#	Date	Audio of the Year	Venue
1st	March 7, 2003	Medal of Honor: Frontline	Fairmont San Jose
2nd	March 25, 2004	Call of Duty	Fairmont San Jose
3rd	March 10, 2005	Halo 2	Fairmont San Jose
4th	March 23, 2006	God of War	Fairmont San Jose
5th	March 8, 2007	Gears of War	Moscone Center
6th	February 21, 2008	BioShock	Moscone Center
7th	March 26, 2009	Dead Space	Moscone Center
8th	March 11, 2010	Uncharted 2: Among Thieves	Moscone Center
9th	March 3, 2011	Red Dead Redemption	Moscone Center
10th	March 8, 2012	Battlefield 3	Moscone Center
11th	March 28, 2013	Diablo III	Moscone Center
12th	March 20, 2014	The Last of Us	Moscone Center
13th	March 5, 2015	Call of Duty: Advanced Warfare	Moscone Center
14th	March 17, 2016	Ori and the Blind Forest	Moscone Center
15th	March 23, 2017	Uncharted 4: A Thief's End	Moscone Center
16th	March 22, 2018	Cuphead	Moscone Center
17th	March 21, 2019	God of War	Moscone Center
18th	May 6, 2020	Death Stranding	Virtual
19th	April 28, 2021	The Last of Us Part II	Virtual
20th	May 25, 2022	Ratchet & Clank: Rift Apart	Virtual
21st	March 23, 2023	God of War Ragnarök	Moscone Center
22nd	March 21, 2024	Star Wars Jedi: Survivor	Moscone Center
23rd	March 20, 2025	Astro Bot and Need for Speed Mobile (tie)	Moscone Center
24th	March 11, 2026	Death Stranding 2: On the Beach	Moscone Center

=== 1st (2003) ===
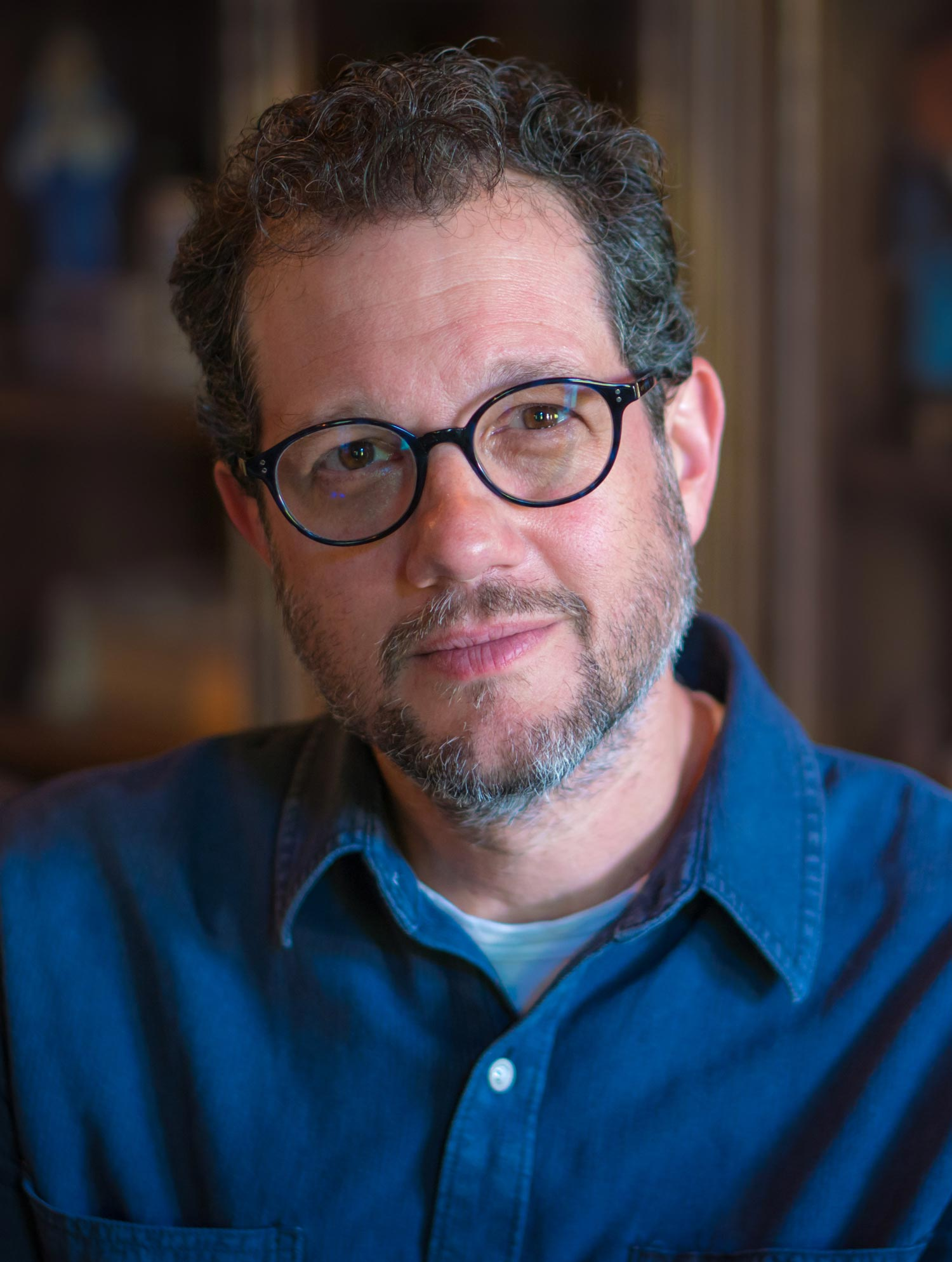
Michael Giacchino won four awards at the 1st Annual G.A.N.G. Awards for his work on Medal of Honor: Frontline and Medal of Honor: Allied Assault.

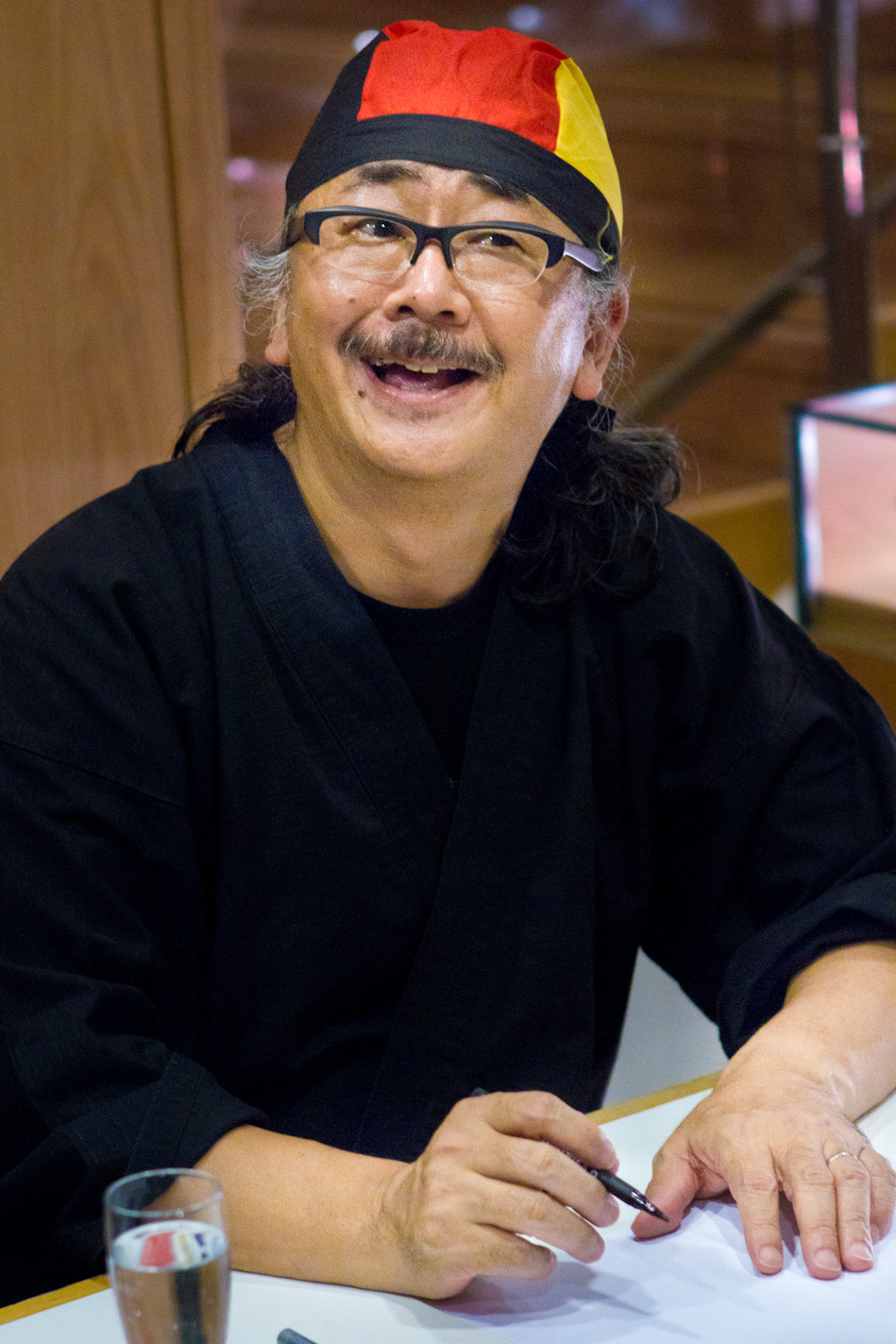
Nobuo Uematsu won Best Original Vocal Song – Choral for "Memoro de la Santono from Final Fantasy XI".

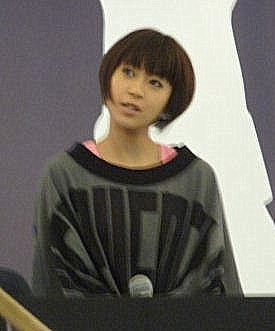
Hikaru Utada won Best Original Vocal Song – Pop for "Kingdom (Vocal Version)" from Kingdom Hearts.

The first G.A.N.G. Awards ceremony took place on March 7, 2003, at the Fairmont San Jose. Almost 500 people attended the ceremony. The awards were presented by members of the Game Audio Network guild, including Tommy Tallarico, Clint Bajakian, and Jack Wall, with musical interludes from LoudLouderLoudest!, Orpheus Hanley, the Slackmates, the Ex Lucas Arts Boys, and George "The Fat Man" Sanger.

==== Overall ====
- Audio of the Year: Medal of Honor: Frontline
- Best Cinematic/Cut-Scene Audio: Warcraft III: Reign of Chaos
- Best Audio – Other: Fisher-Price Pixter Pro Base and Leap Frog Imagination Desk Reading Games (tie)
- Best Handheld Audio: Alienators: Evolution Continues
- Best Website Audio: Blitz Digital Studios
- Best Edutainment/Children Audio: Learning 2nd/3rd Grade

==== Music ====
- Music of the Year: Medal of Honor: Frontline
- Best Live Performance Recording: "Operation Market Garden" — Medal of Honor: Frontline
- Best Interactive Score: James Bond 007: Nightfire
- Best Instrumental Song: "Allied Assault Main Theme" by Michael Giacchino — Medal of Honor: Allied Assault
- Best Original Vocal Song – Choral: "Memoro de la Santono" by Nobuo Uematsu — Final Fantasy XI
- Best Original Vocal Song – Pop: "Kingdom (Vocal Version)" by Hikaru Utada — Kingdom Hearts
- Best Use of Licensed Music: Grand Theft Auto: Vice City
- Best Original Soundtrack Album: The Best of LucasArts
- Best Arrangement of a Non-Original Score: James Bond 007: Nightfire

==== Sound Design ====
- Sound Design of the Year: Medal of Honor: Frontline
- Best Sound Design in a Sports or Driving Game: FIFA World Cup 2002
- Best Use of Multi-Channel Surround in a Game: James Bond 007: Nightfire

==== Voice Acting ====
- Best Dialogue: Grand Theft Auto: Vice City
- Best Commentary in a Sports Game: Madden NFL 2003

==== Industry and Trade ====
- Best New Audio Technology: XACT
- Best Audio Software: Steinberg Cubase SX
- Best Audio Hardware: Digidesign Digi002
- Best Sound Library: Vienna Symphonic Library Orchestral Cube

==== Recognition ====
- Most Innovative Use of Audio: SOCOM U.S. Navy SEALs
- Best Game Audio Article, Publication or Broadcast: "The Use and Effectiveness of Audio in Halo: Game Music Evolved" by Marty O'Donnell, Aaron Marks, and Greg O'Connor-Read
- G.A.N.G. Recognition Award: Music4Games and Headhunter
- Lifetime Achievement Award: Mark Miller
- Rookie of the Year: Shane Kneip
- Best Audio Programmer: Buzz Burrowes
- Best Producer/Designer: Dan Irish
- Distinguished G.A.N.G. Service Awards: Sach Jobbs, Jay Samerad, Todd Fay, and Mike Tallarico
- G.A.N.G. Contest Winners: Sam Hulick (songwriting), and Rob King (sound design)

=== 2nd (2004) ===
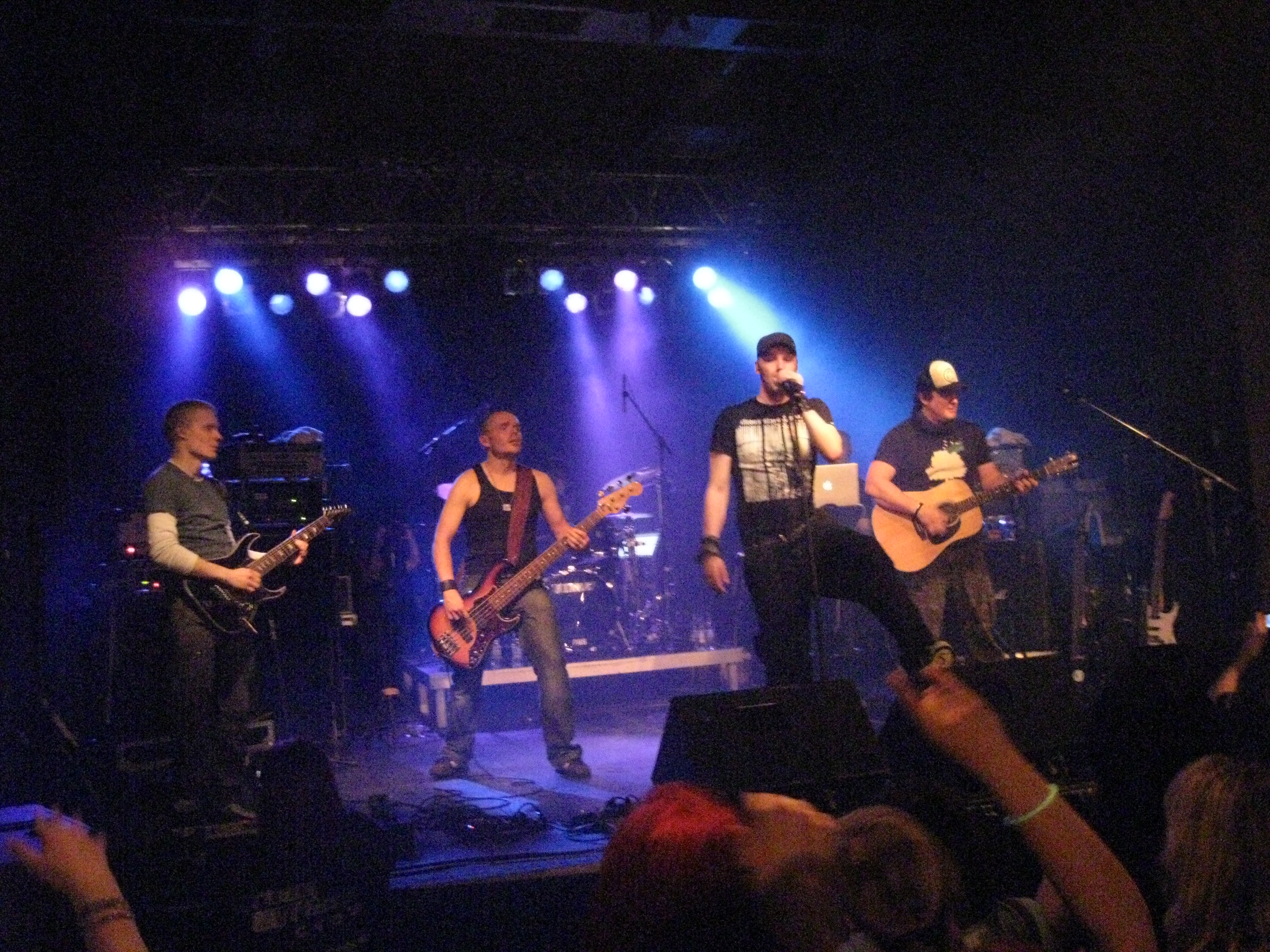
Poets of the Fall won Best Original Vocal Song – Pop for "Late Goodbye" from Max Payne 2: The Fall of Max Payne.

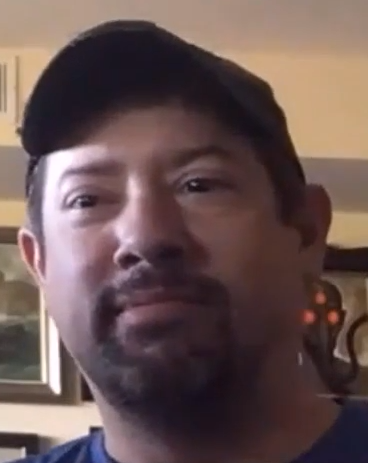
Cris Velasco

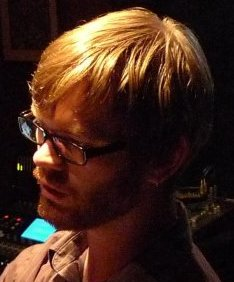
Jared Emerson-Johnson

Velasco and Emerson-Johnson were awarded Rookie of the Year.

The second annual G.A.N.G. Awards ceremony took place on March 25, 2004, at the Fairmont San Jose in the Regency Ballroom. Tallarico returned to host the ceremony, which took place over two-and-a-half hours. Musical performances included Steve Kirk and the Voodoo Vince Band, LoudLouderLoudest!, the Rockin' hobbit Band, the OneUp Mushrooms, and Dweezil Zappa.

==== Overall ====
- Audio of the Year: Call of Duty
- Best Cinematic/Cut-Scene Audio: Warcraft III: The Frozen Throne
- Best Audio – Other: LeapFrog Leapster: SpongeBob SquarePants
- Best Handheld Audio: 007: Everything or Nothing
- Best Website Audio: Shiny Entertainment
- Best Edutainment/Children Audio: Tonka: Rescue Patrol

==== Music ====
- Music of the Year: Indiana Jones and the Emperor's Tomb
- Best Live Performance Recording: Indiana Jones and the Emperor's Tomb
- Best Interactive Score: Indiana Jones and the Emperor's Tomb
- Best Original Instrumental Song: "Max Payne Theme" — Max Payne 2: The Fall of Max Payne
- Best Original Vocal Song – Choral: "Gallery Theme" by Tim Larkin — Uru: Ages Beyond Myst
- Best Original Vocal Song – Pop: "Late Goodbye" by Poets of the Fall — Max Payne 2: The Fall of Max Payne
- Best Use of Licensed Music: The Lord of the Rings: The Return of the King
- Best Original Soundtrack Album: The Hobbit
- Best Arrangement of a Non-Original Score: Indiana Jones and the Emperor's Tomb

==== Sound Design ====
- Sound Design of the Year: Call of Duty
- Best Sound Design in a Sports or Driving Game: Need for Speed: Underground
- Best Use of Multi-Channel Surround in a Game: The Lord of the Rings: The Return of the King

==== Voice Acting ====
- Best Dialogue: The Getaway
- Best Commentary in a Sports Game: Madden NFL 2004

==== Industry and Trade ====
- Best New Audio Technology: Yamaha Vocaloid
- Best Audio Software: Spectrasonics Atmosphere & Native Instruments Absynth 2.0
- Best Audio Hardware: Pro Tools HD Accel
- Best Sound Library: Sound Ideas

==== Recognition ====
- Lifetime Achievement Award: Rob Hubbard
- G.A.N.G. Recognition Awards: Brian O'Connor and Mark Sazer (RMA, Chris Milner and Carol M. Sato (AFM), Escalet, George Aiello, Bill Mitchell
- Rookie of the Year: Cris Velasco and Jared Emerson-Johnson
- Silas Warner Best Audio Programming Award: Thomas Engel (Factor 5)
- Best Producer/Designer: Simon Pressey (Ubisoft)
- Most Innovative Use of Audio: Amplitude (Chuck Doud)
- Best Game Audio Article, Publication or Broadcast: "DirectX 9 Audio Exposed: Interactive Audio Development" by Todd M. Fay
- Distinguished Service Awards: Brian DiDomenico, Jamie Lendino, Jerome Rossen
- G.A.N.G. Contest Winners: Ian Dorsch (composition), Jonathan Wall (sound design)
- Golden Melodica Award: Tommy Tallarico

=== 3rd (2005) ===
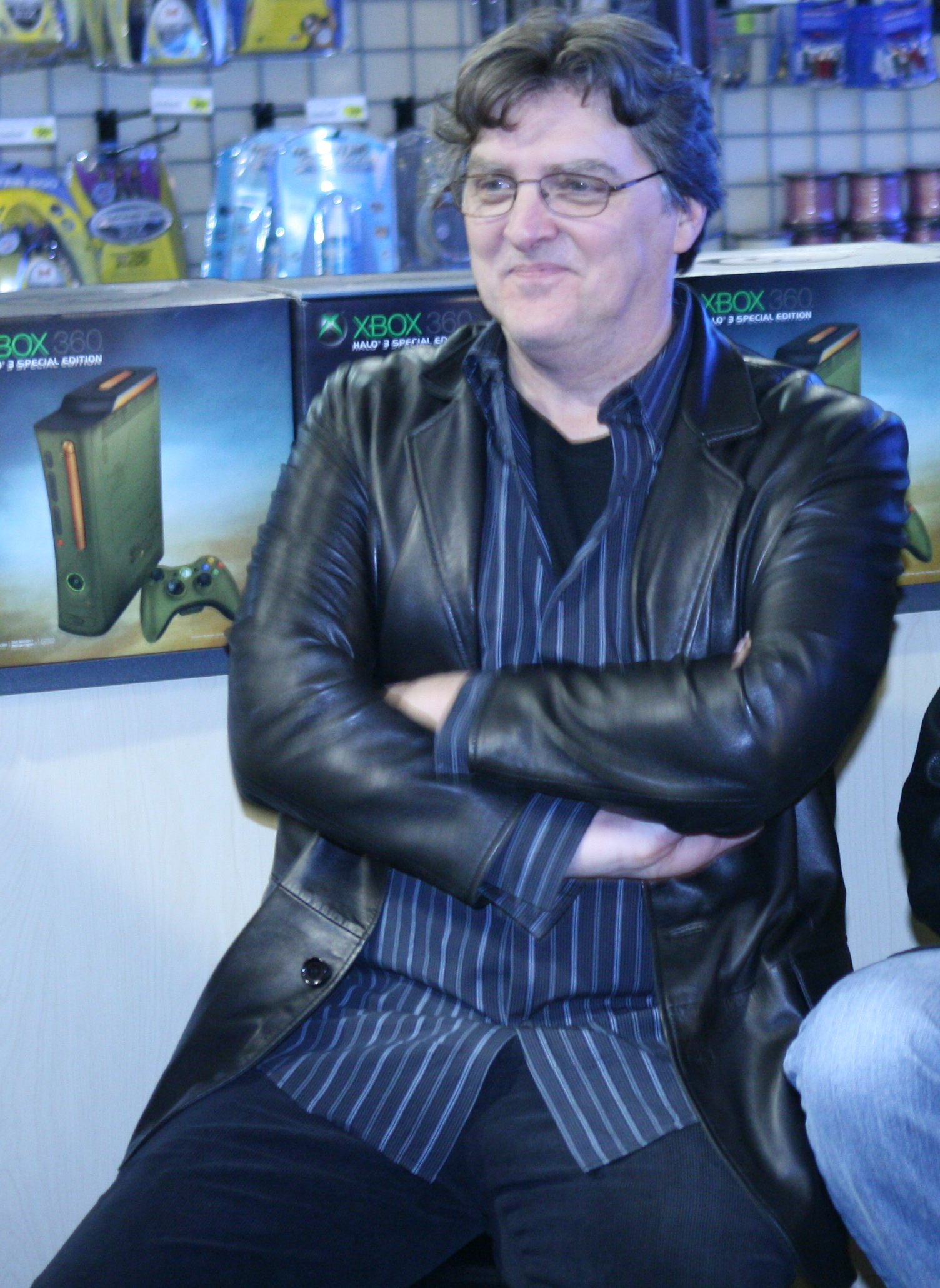
Martin O'Donnell

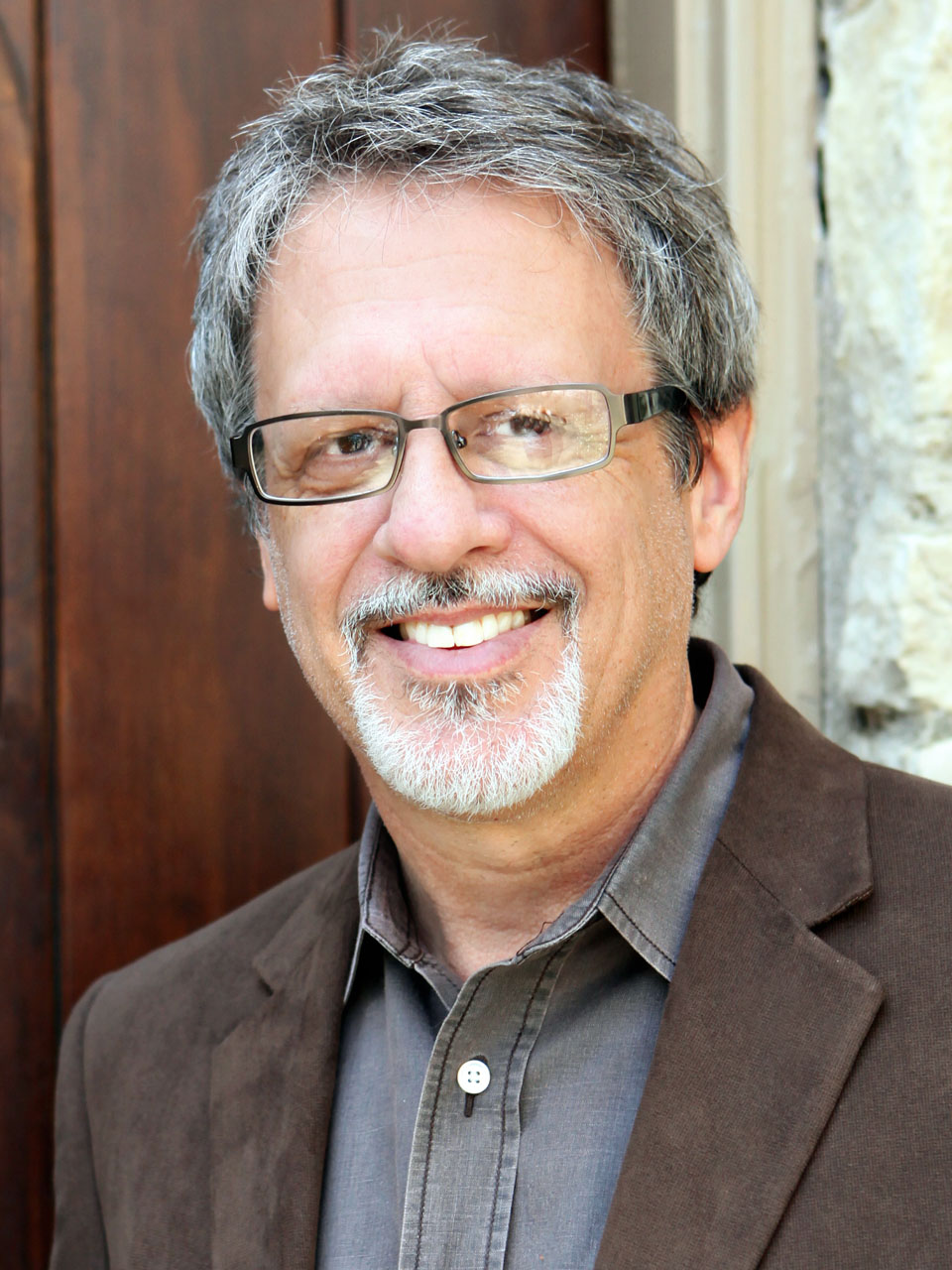
Michael Salvatori

O'Donnell and Salvatori won Audio of the Year and Best Original Soundtrack Album for their work on Halo 2.

The third annual G.A.N.G. Awards ceremony took place on March 10, 2005, at the Fairmont San Jose as part of the Game Developers Conference. Myst IV: Revelation led the winners with three awards.

==== Overall ====
- Audio of the Year: Halo 2
- Best Cinematic/Cut-Scene Audio: Hitman Contracts and The Lord of the Rings: The Battle for Middle-Earth (tie)
- Best Audio – Other: River Reader Rabbit series for LeapPad
- Best Handheld Audio: Spider-Man 2
- Best Website Audio: Speak Getaway
- Best Edutainment/Children Audio: Barbie: Princess and the Pauper

==== Music ====
- Music of the Year: Myst IV: Revelation
- Best Live Performance Recording: Myst IV: Revelation
- Best Interactive Score: Sly 2: Band of Thieves
- Best Original Instrumental Song: "Main Theme" by Inon Zur — Men of Valor
- Best Original Vocal Song – Choral: "Main Theme" by Jack Wall — Myst IV: Revelation
- Best Original Vocal Song – Pop: "Snake Eater" by Norihiko Hibino — Metal Gear Solid 3: Snake Eater
- Best Use of Licensed Music: Grand Theft Auto: San Andreas
- Best Original Soundtrack Album: Halo 2
- Best Arrangement of a Non-Original Score: EverQuest II

==== Sound Design ====
- Sound Design of the Year: Call of Duty: Finest Hour
- Best Sound Design in a Sports or Driving Game: ESPN NFL 2K5
- Best Use of Multi-Channel Surround in a Game: The Chronicles of Riddick: Escape from Butcher Bay

==== Voice Acting ====
- Best Dialogue: Grand Theft Auto: San Andreas
- Best Commentary in a Sports Game: ESPN NFL 2K5

==== Industry and Trade ====
- Best New Audio Technology: GameCODA 2.0
- Best Audio Software: Nuendo 3.0
- Best Audio Hardware: Spherex Xbox 5.1 Surround Sound System
- Best Sound Library: Quantum Leap Symphonic Orchestra: Platinum Edition

==== Recognition ====
- Lifetime Achievement Award: Michael Land
- G.A.N.G. Recognition Awards: Didier Lord, Bob Rice, and Steve Schnur
- Rookie of the Year: Tom Salta
- Silas Warner Best Audio Programming Award: John Twigg, Cliff Kondratuik
- Best Producer/Designer: Donald Mustard (GlyphX)
- Most Innovative Use of Audio: Donkey Konga
- Best Game Audio Article, Publication or Broadcast: "Audio for Games: Planning, Process and Production" by Alexander Brandon
- Distinguished Service Awards: Chris Rickwood, Jonathan Wall, Matt Bielejeski, and Alistair Cooper

=== 4th (2006) ===
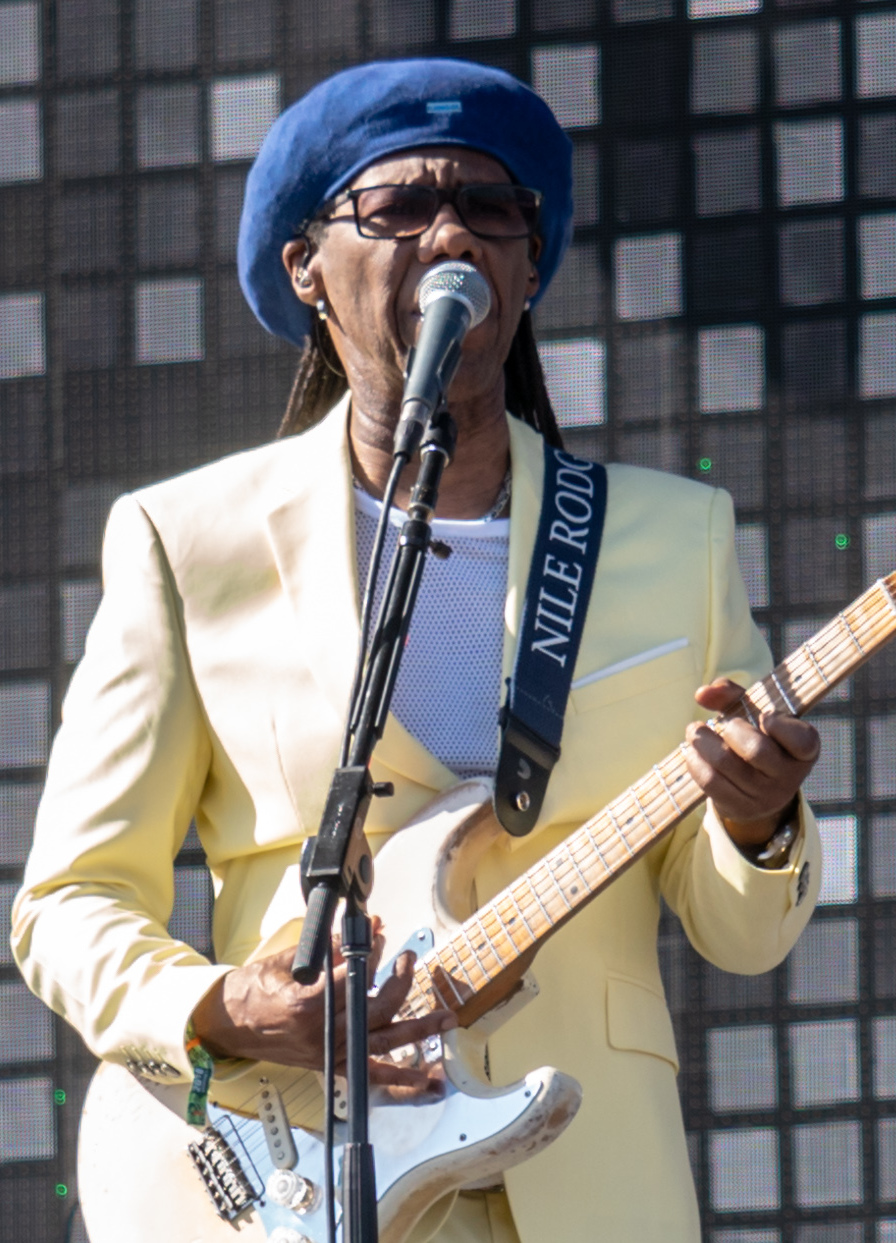
Nile Rodgers was one of the two recipients of the G.A.N.G. Recognition Awards.

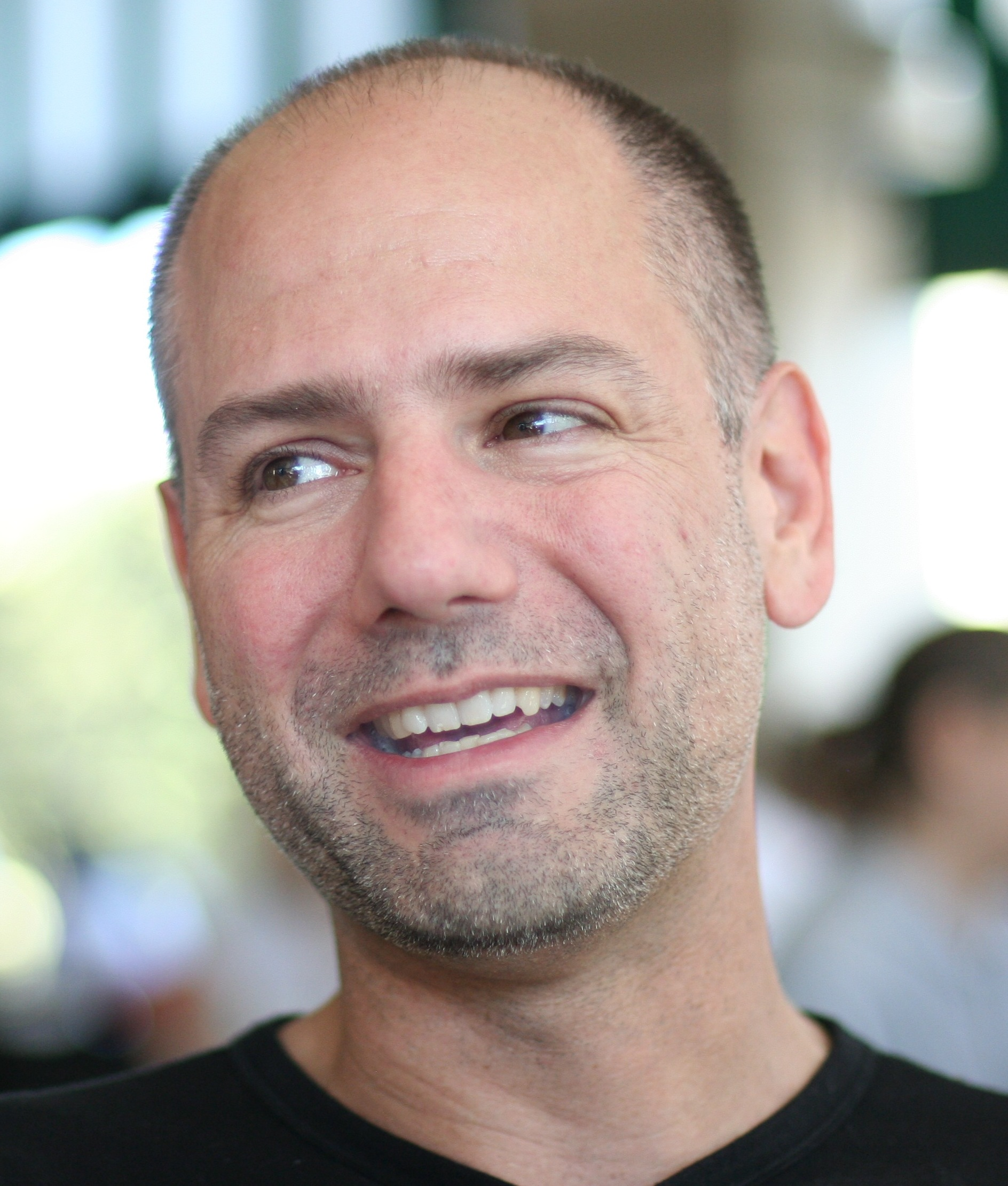
Gerard Marino won Rookie of the Year in 2006.

The fourth annual G.A.N.G. Awards ceremony took place on March 23, 2006, at the Fairmont San Jose. God of War swept most of the major categories.

==== Overall ====
- Audio of the Year: God of War
- Best Cinematic/Cut-Scene Audio: God of War
- Best Audio – Other: Lumines

==== Music ====
- Music of the Year: God of War
- Best Live Performance Recording: God of War
- Best Interactive Score: God of War
- Best Original Instrumental Song: "The Tragic Hero" by Chance Thomas — Peter Jackson's King Kong
- Best Original Vocal Song – Choral: "Muse by Tommy Tallarico — Advent Rising
- Best Original Vocal Song – Pop: "Katamari on the Swing" by Yuri Misumi, Hiroshi Okubo, Masashi Sugiyama, Katsuro Tajima, Hideki Tobeta, Akitata Toyama, Yoshihito Yano, Tomomitsu Kaneko, and Kanako Kakino — We Love Katamari
- Best Use of Licensed Music: Guitar Hero
- Best Original Soundtrack Album: Jade Empire
- Best Arrangement of a Non-Original Score: The Nightmare Before Christmas: Oogie's Revenge

==== Sound Design ====
- Sound Design of the Year: God of War
- Best Sound Design in a Sports or Driving Game: Need for Speed: Most Wanted
- Best Use of Multi-Channel Surround in a Game: Call of Duty 2

==== Voice Acting ====
- Best Dialogue: God of War

==== Industry and Trade ====
- Best New Audio Technology: XMA
- Best Audio Software: Spectrasonics Stylus RMX — Real Time Groove Module
- Best Audio Hardware: M-Audio MicroTrack 24/96
- Best Sound Library: East West/Quantum Leap Symphonic Choirs

==== Recognition ====
- Lifetime Achievement Award: Bobby Prince
- G.A.N.G. Recognition Awards: Nile Rodgers and Jim Charne
- Rookie of the Year: Gerard Marino
- Student/Apprentice Competition: Wilbert Roget (music), and Carsten Rojahn (sound design)
- Most Innovative Use of Audio: Guitar Hero
- Best Game Audio Article, Publication or Broadcast: "The Treatment of Music in Games" by Jim Charne
- Distinguished Service Awards: Paul Lipson, Mark Guleno, Shiloh Hobel, Jerry Lyons, and Michelle Sorger

=== 5th (2007) ===
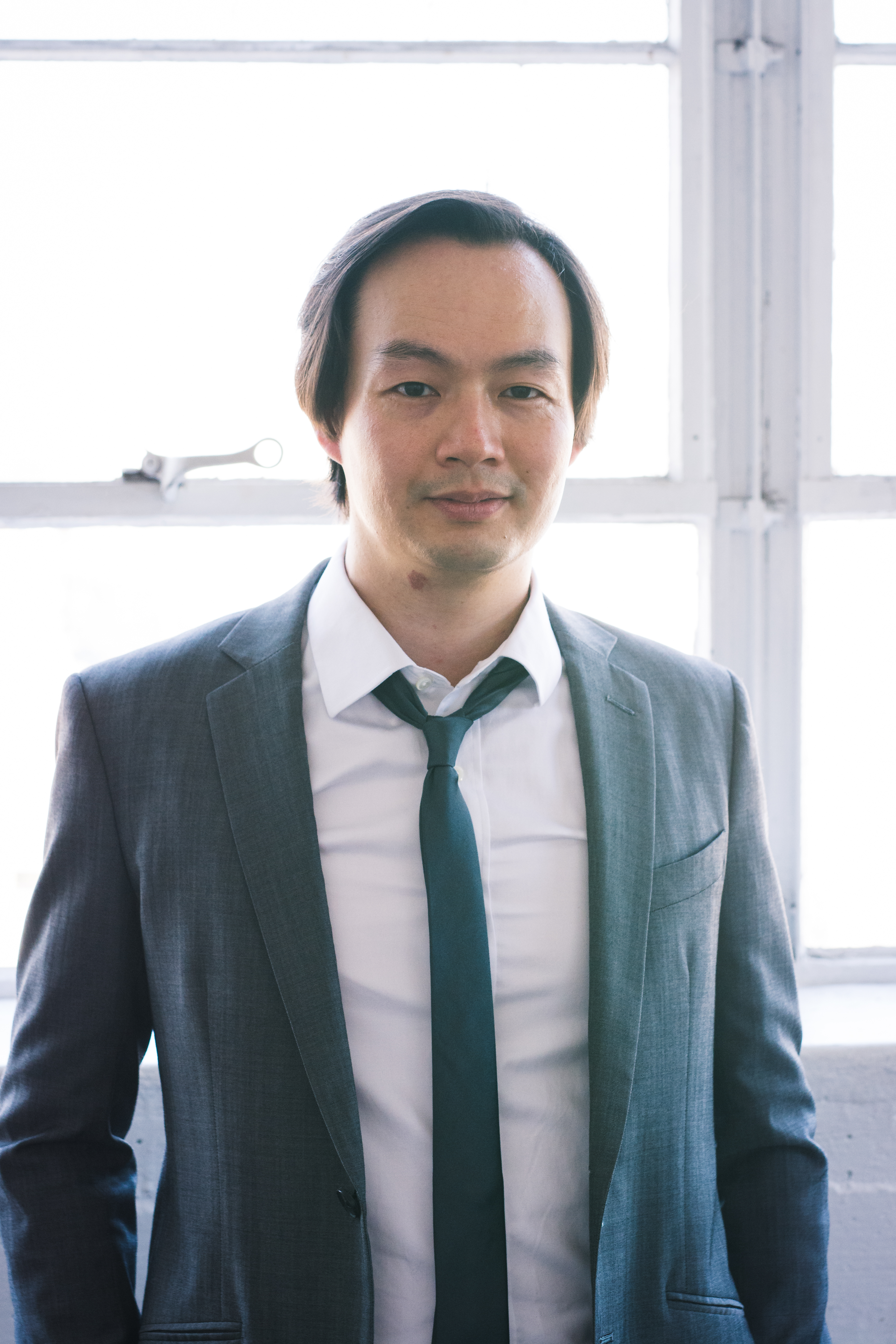
Christopher Tin was named Rookie of the Year in 2007, and won Best Original Vocal Song – Choral for "Baby Yetu" from Civilization IV.

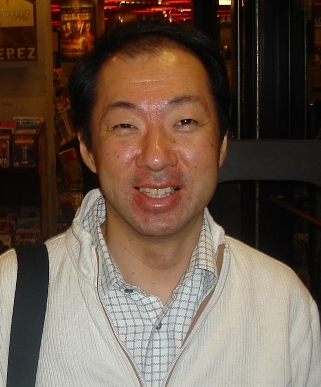
Koji Kondo received the Lifetime Achievement Award in 2007.

The fifth annual G.A.N.G. Awards ceremony took place on March 8, 2007, at the Moscone Center in San Francisco.

==== Overall ====
- Audio of the Year: Gears of War
- Best Cinematic/Cut-Scene Audio: Gears of War
- Best Audio – Other: Cartoon Network's Re-Animated: Fit to be Pied

==== Music ====
- Music of the Year: Tomb Raider: Legend
- Best Interactive Score: Need for Speed: Carbon
- Best Original Instrumental Song: "Titan" by Tilman Sillescu and Pierre Langer — Paraworld
- Best Original Vocal Song – Choral: "Baby Yetu" by Christopher Tin — Civilization IV
- Best Original Vocal Song – Pop: "Dr. Kunckle's Funnkle Cake" by Jesse Harlin and David W. Collins — Thrillville
- Best Use of Licensed Music: Guitar Hero II
- Best Original Soundtrack Album: Halo 2: Volume Two
- Best Arrangement of a Non-Original Score: The Godfather and Onimusha: Dawn of Dreams (tie)

==== Sound Design ====
- Sound Design of the Year: Gears of War
- Best Use of Multi-Channel Surround in a Game: Call of Duty 3

==== Voice Acting ====
- Best Dialogue: 24: The Game

==== Recognition ====
- Lifetime Achievement Award: Koji Kondo
- G.A.N.G. Recognition Awards: Audiokinetic and Gene Semel
- Rookie of the Year: Christopher Tin
- Student Contest Winners: JJ Lee (music composition), Vince Iannelli (sound design)
- Student/Apprentice Competition Winners: Ivo Ivanov and Ryan John
- Distinguished Service Awards: Scott Gershin, David Murrant, and Scott Selfon
- Most Innovative Use of Audio: Guitar Hero II
- Best Game Audio Article, Publication or Broadcast: "2006 GDC Audio Boot Camp" by Scott Selfon

=== 6th (2008) ===
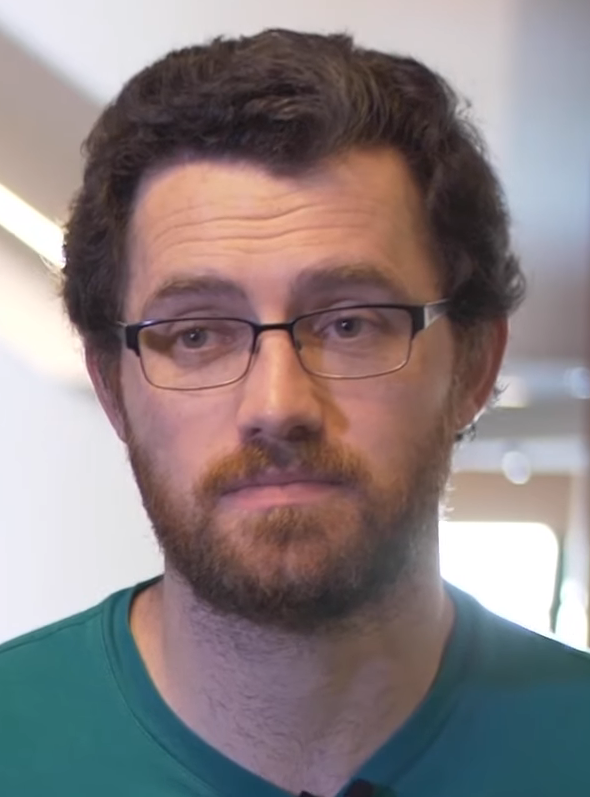
Austin Wintory won Rookie of the Year.

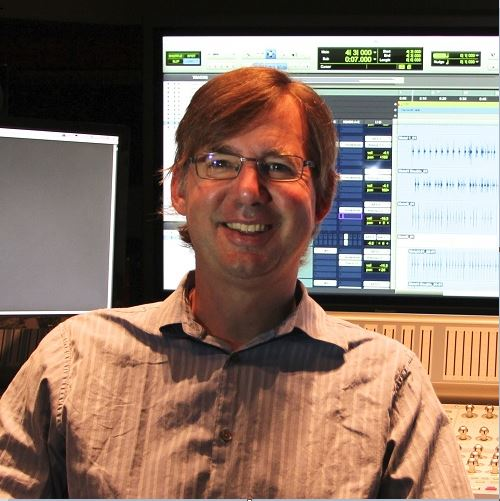
Brian L. Schmidt received the Lifetime Achievement Award in 2008.

The sixth annual G.A.N.G. Awards ceremony took place on February 21, 2008, in the North Hall of the Moscone Center in San Francisco. BioShock swept the ceremony, winning all eight awards for which it was nominated. At the ceremony, a US$10,000 scholarship to Ex'pression College for Digital Arts was awarded to guild member Nathan Rain Schwartz. According to Tallarico, the guild's advisory board took over a month to decide final nominees.

==== Overall ====
- Audio of the Year: BioShock
- Best Cinematic/Cut-Scene Audio: BioShock
- Best Audio – Other: Jewel Quest II
- Best Handheld Audio: Syphon Filter: Logan's Shadow

==== Music ====
- Music of the Year: BioShock
- Best Interactive Score: BioShock
- Best Original Instrumental Song: "Welcome to Rapture" — BioShock
- Best Original Vocal Song – Choral: "Main Titles" — God of War II
- Best Original Vocal Song – Pop: "Still Alive" — Portal
- Best Use of Licensed Music: BioShock
- Best Original Soundtrack Album: God of War II
- Best Arrangement of a Non-Original Score: The Simpsons Game

==== Sound Design ====
- Sound Design of the Year: BioShock
- Best Use of Multi-Channel Surround in a Game: Halo 3

==== Voice Acting ====
- Best Dialogue: BioShock

==== Recognition ====
- Lifetime Achievement Award: Brian L. Schmidt
- G.A.N.G. Recognition Awards: Russell Brower, Rod Abernathy, and Michael "Piano Squall" Gluck
- Rookie of the Year: Austin Wintory and Tomas Neumann
- Student/Apprentice Competition Winners: Mike "Skitch" Schichiano (music) and Mikkel Eskessen (sound design)
- Most Innovative Use of Audio: Tom Clancy's Ghost Recon Advanced Warfighter 2
- Best Game Audio Article, Publication or Broadcast: "The World of Game Composing" — Film Music Magazine
- Distinguished Service Awards: Sean Beeson, Jerry Lyons, Chance Thomas, and Becky Young

=== 7th (2009) ===
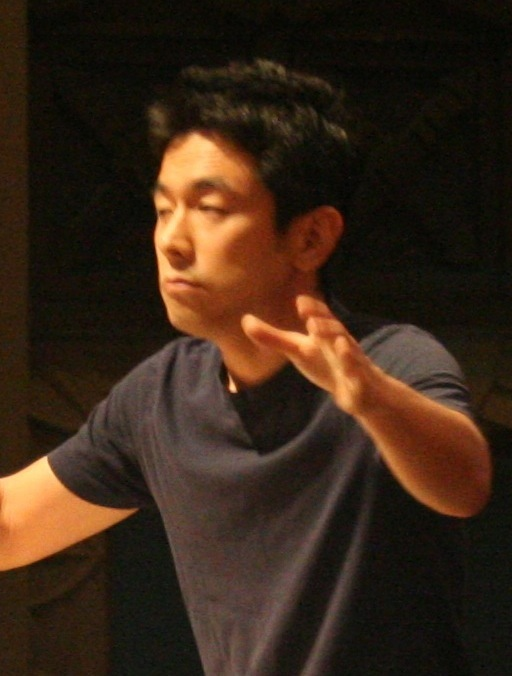
Wataru Hokoyama won Rookie of the Year in 2009, and Music of the Year for his work on Afrika.

The seventh annual G.A.N.G. Awards were held on March 26, 2009, in the North Hall of the Moscone Center as part of the Game Developers Conference. LittleBigPlanet led the nominees with eight nominations. Dead Space won Audio of the Year and Sound Design of the Year, while Afrika won Music of the Year; Wataru Hokoyama, composer of the latter, won Rookie of the Year. Votes were conducted by the 800 members of the guild across 30 countries.

==== Overall ====
- Audio of the Year: Dead Space
- Best Cinematic/Cut-Scene Audio: World of Warcraft: Wrath of the Lich King and Gears of War 2 (tie)
- Best Audio – Other: Watchmen: Motion Comic
- Best Handheld Audio: God of War: Chains of Olympus

==== Music ====
- Music of the Year: Afrika
- Best Interactive Score: LittleBigPlanet
- Best Original Instrumental Song: "The Garden" — LittleBigPlanet and "Main Theme" — Afrika (tie)
- Best Original Vocal Song – Choral: "Main Title" — World of Warcraft: Wrath of the Lich King
- Best Original Vocal Song – Pop: "Still Alive" — Mirror's Edge
- Best Use of Licensed Music: Rock Band 2
- Best Original Soundtrack Album: Video Games Live: Volume One

==== Sound Design ====
- Sound Design of the Year: Dead Space
- Best Use of Multi-Channel Surround in a Game: Left 4 Dead

==== Voice Acting ====
- Best Dialogue: Grand Theft Auto IV

==== Recognition ====
- Lifetime Achievement Award: Bob Rice
- G.A.N.G. Recognition Awards: Jim Charne and John Broomhall
- Student/Apprentice Competition Winners: Tom Graczkowski (music composition) and Benoit Babin (sound design)
- Rookie of the Year: Wataru Hokoyama
- Best Game Audio Article, Publication or Broadcast: "The Complete Guide to Game Audio" by Aaron Marks
- Distinguished Service Awards: Richard Jacques, Tom Salta, and Stephen Years

=== 8th (2010) ===
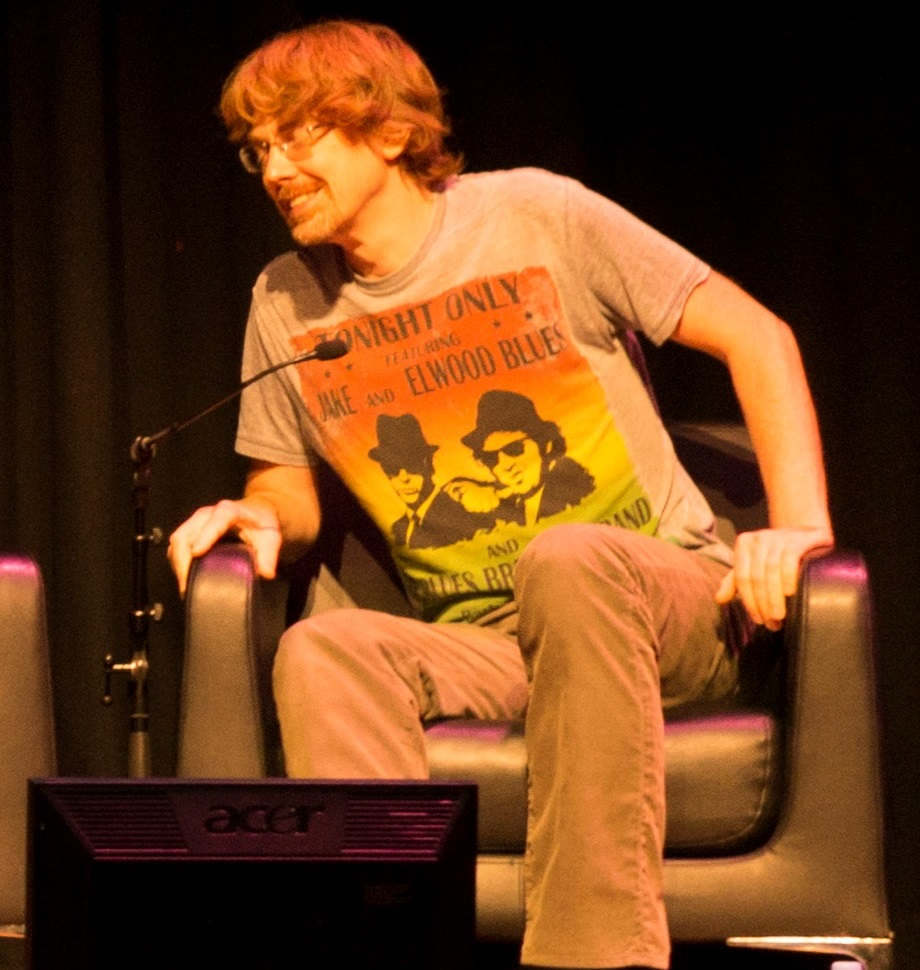
Jesper Kyd

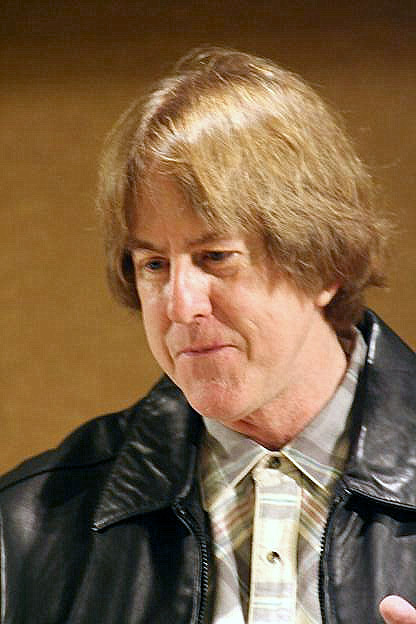
Greg Edmonson

Kyd and Edmonson tied as winners of Music of the Year for their work on Assassin's Creed II and Uncharted 2: Among Thieves, respectively.

The eighth annual G.A.N.G. Awards were held on March 11, 2010, at the Moscone Center. Assassin's Creed II and Uncharted 2: Among Thieves led the nominations with nine each.

==== Overall ====
- Audio of the Year: Uncharted 2: Among Thieves
- Best Cinematic/Cut-Scene Audio: Uncharted 2: Among Thieves
- Best Handheld Audio: The Secret of Monkey Island: Special Edition

==== Music ====
- Music of the Year: Assassin's Creed II and Uncharted 2: Among Thieves (tie)
- Best Interactive Score: Flower
- Best Original Instrumental Song: "Reunion" — Uncharted 2: Among Thieves
- Best Original Vocal Song – Choral: "Halls of Iron" — World of Warcraft: Secrets of Ulduar
- Best Original Vocal Song – Pop: "Plants vs. Zombies" — Plants vs. Zombies
- Best Use of Licensed Music: Rock Band: The Beatles
- Best Original Soundtrack Album: Infamous

==== Sound Design ====
- Sound Design of the Year: Uncharted 2: Among Thieves
- Best Use of Multi-Channel Surround in a Game: Call of Duty: Modern Warfare 2

==== Voice Acting ====
- Best Dialogue: Uncharted 2: Among Thieves

==== Recognition ====
- Lifetime Achievement Award: Charles Deenen
- G.A.N.G. Recognition Awards: Brian L. Schmidt
- Student/Apprentice Competition Winners: Courtney Johns (music composition) and Jeff Schmidt (sound design)
- Rookie of the Year: Dave Johnson and Camden Stoddard
- Best Game Audio Article, Publication or Broadcast: "The Future of Game Audio / The Game Audio Mixing Revolution" (Gamasutra)
- Distinguished Service Awards: Rob Bridgett, Morla Gorrondona, Chip Beeman, Alexander Brandon, and David Chan

=== 9th (2011) ===
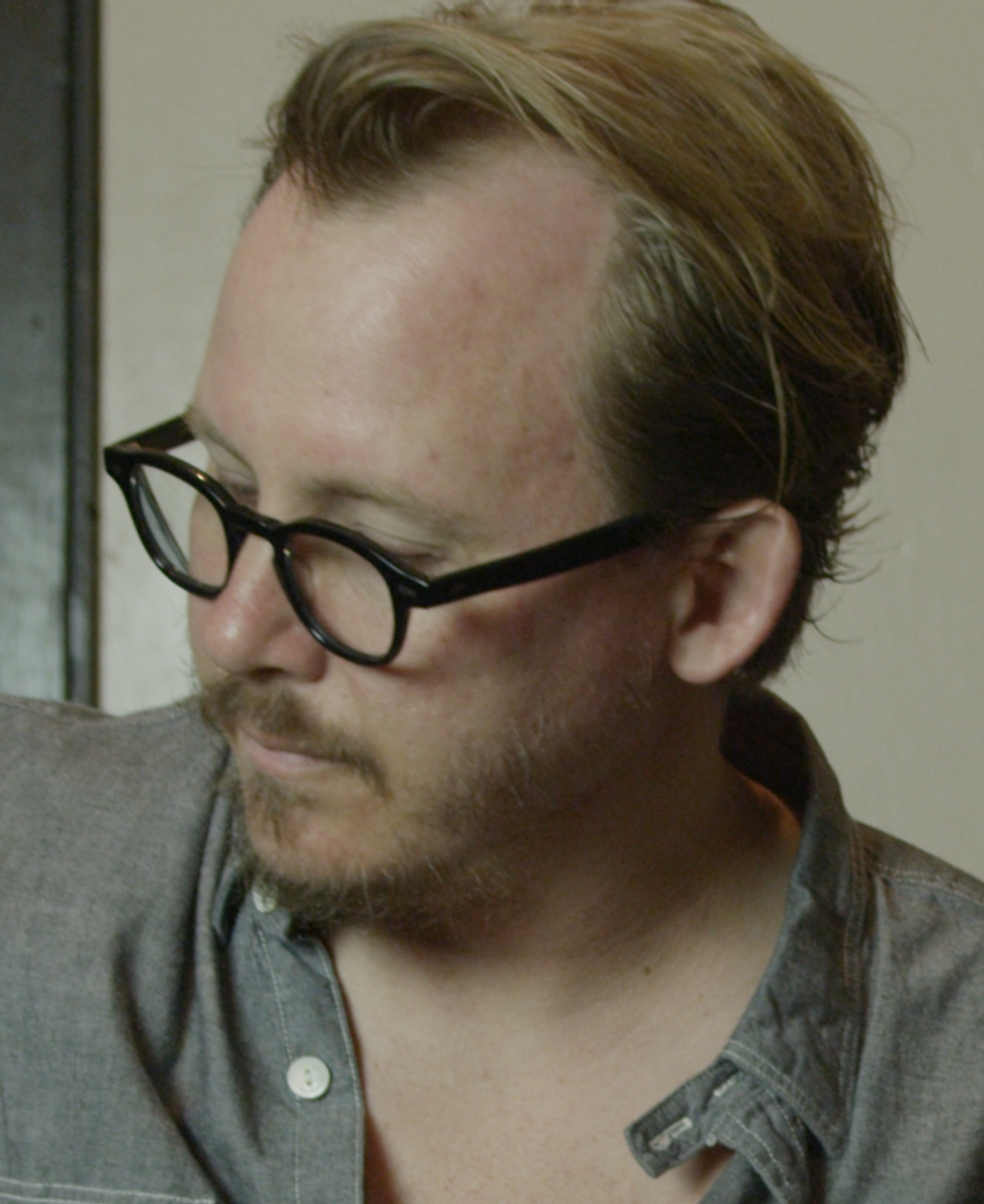
Woody Jackson won Music of the Year and Rookie of the Year for his work on Red Dead Redemption alongside Bill Elm.

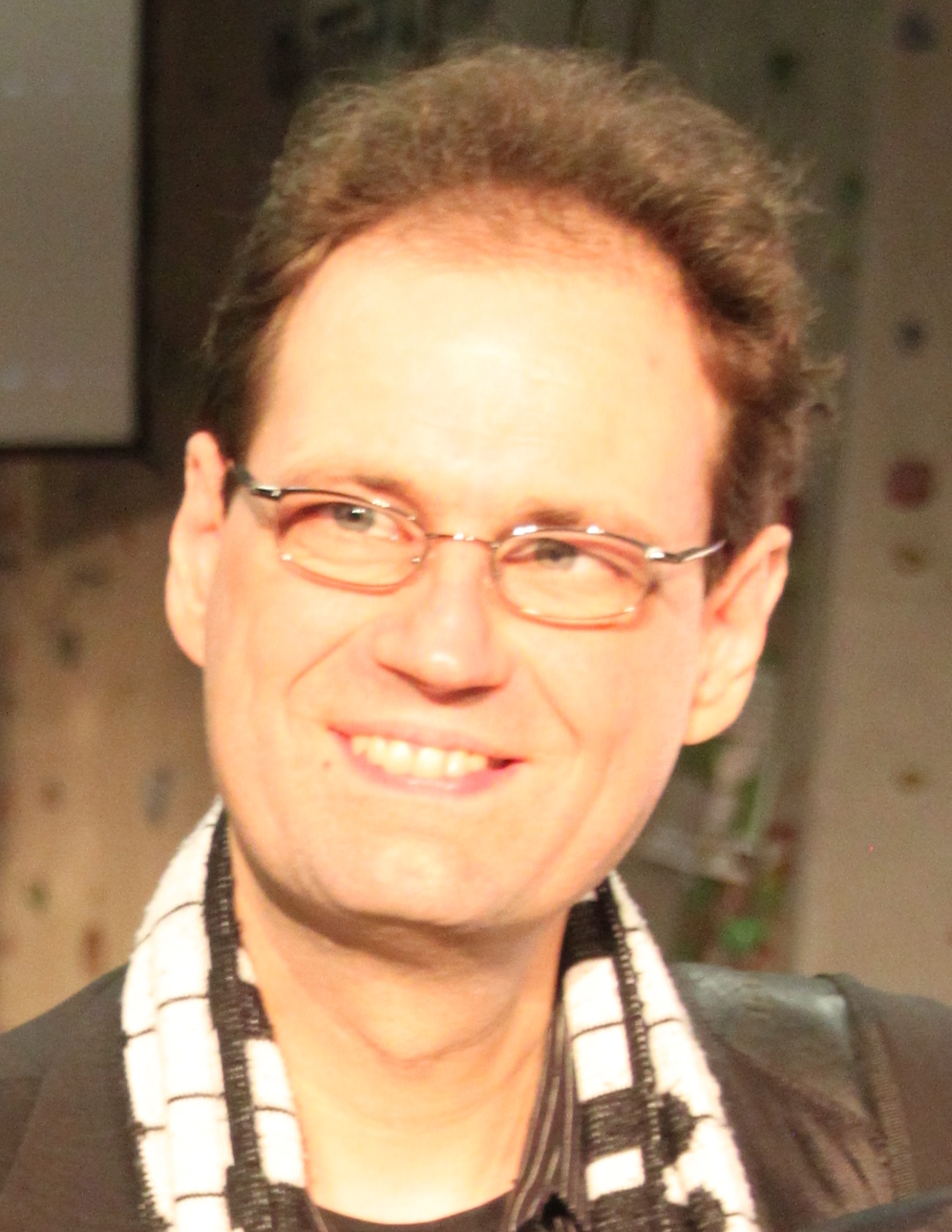
Chris Huelsbeck won the Lifetime Achievement Award in 2011.

The ninth annual G.A.N.G. Awards were held on March 3, 2011, at the Moscone Center during the Game Developers Conference. The final nominees were decided upon by a 70-person advisory committee, while the winners received votes from the members of the Game Audio Network Guild. More than 350 submissions were considered by the committee across the 14 categories. Red Dead Redemption led the show with ten nominations and five wins.

==== Overall ====
- Audio of the Year: Red Dead Redemption
- Best Cinematic/Cut-Scene Audio: Starcraft II
- Best Audio – Other: Halo: Waypoint
- Best Handheld Audio: Monkey Island 2: LeChuck's Revenge Special Edition

==== Music ====
- Music of the Year: Red Dead Redemption
- Best Interactive Score: Red Dead Redemption
- Best Original Instrumental Song: "Athens Harbour Chase" — James Bond 007: Blood Stone
- Best Original Vocal Song – Choral: "Invincible" — World of Warcraft: Cataclysm
- Best Original Vocal Song – Pop: "I'll Take It All" — James Bond 007: Blood Stone
- Best Use of Licensed Music: BioShock 2
- Best Original Soundtrack Album: Video Games Live: Level Two

==== Sound Design ====
- Sound Design of the Year: Battlefield: Bad Company 2
- Best Use of Multi-Channel Surround in a Game: Battlefield: Bad Company 2

==== Voice Acting ====
- Best Dialogue: Red Dead Redemption

==== Recognition ====
- Lifetime Achievement Award: Chris Huelsbeck
- G.A.N.G. Recognition Awards: Sumthing Else Musicworks
- Student/Apprentice Competition Winners: Paolo Amati (music composition) and Adam Raley (sound design)
- Rookie of the Year: Bill Elm and Woody Jackson
- Best Game Audio Article, Publication or Broadcast: "The Weight of Silence — How Silence Can Indicate a Character's Importance" by Jesse Harlin
- Distinguished Service Awards: Dren McDonald and Jacquie Shriver

=== 10th (2012) ===
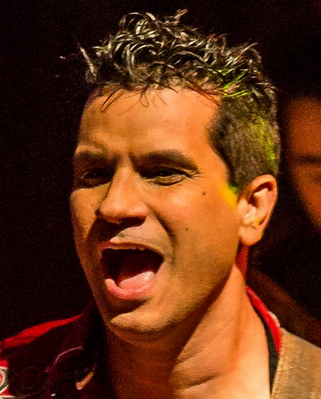
Tommy Tallarico, who founded the Game Audio Network Guild and hosted some of the early ceremonies, won the Lifetime Achievement Award in 2012.

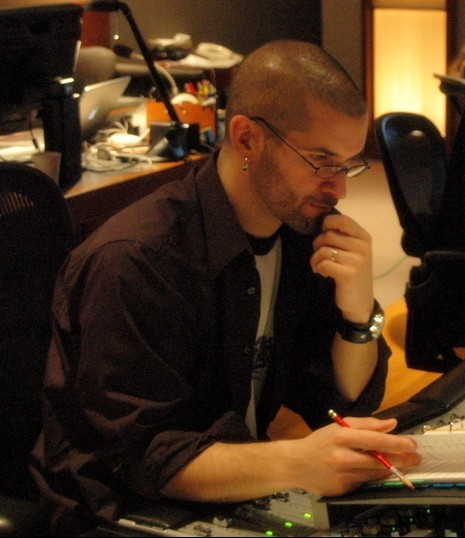
Kevin Riepl won the G.A.N.G. Recognition Award in 2012.

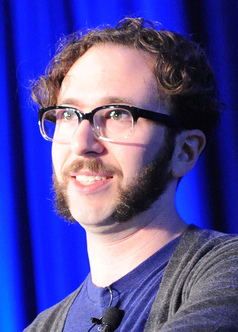
Darren Korb won Rookie of the Year in 2012.

The tenth annual G.A.N.G. Awards were held on March 3, 2012, at the Moscone Center. Battlefield 3 won the most awards, with three wins, while Bastion, Portal 2, and Star Wars: The Old Republic won two awards each.

==== Overall ====
- Audio of the Year: Battlefield 3
- Best Cinematic/Cut-Scene Audio: Uncharted 3: Drake's Deception
- Best Audio in a Casual/Indie/Social Game: Bastion
- Best Handheld Audio: Infinity Blade II

==== Music ====
- Music of the Year: L.A. Noire
- Best Interactive Score: Kinect: Disneyland Adventures and Portal 2 (tie)
- Best Original Instrumental Song: "Glory, The Galactic Republic" — Star Wars: The Old Republic
- Best Original Vocal Song – Choral: "Main Theme" — The Elder Scrolls V: Skyrim
- Best Original Vocal Song – Pop: "Want You Gone" — Portal 2
- Best Use of Licensed Music: Kinect Disneyland Adventures
- Best Original Soundtrack Album: Star Wars: The Old Republic — Collector's Edition Soundtrack

==== Sound Design ====
- Sound Design of the Year: Battlefield 3
- Best Use of Multi-Channel Surround in a Game: Battlefield 3

==== Voice Acting ====
- Best Dialogue: Portal 2

==== Recognition ====
- Lifetime Achievement Award: Tommy Tallarico
- G.A.N.G. Recognition Awards Kevin Riepl
- Student/Apprentice Competition Winners: Nathaniel Tronrud (music) and Matthew Chastney (sound design)
- Rookie of the Year: Darren Korb
- Best Game Audio Article, Publication or Broadcast: "The Use of Voice in Portal 2"

=== 11th (2013) ===
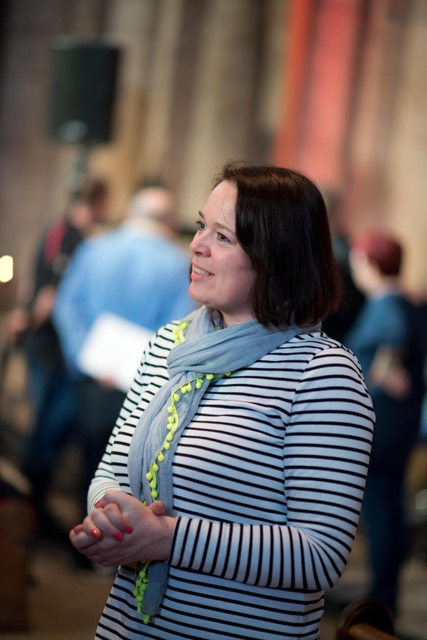
Jessica Curry was one of the two recipients of Rookie of the Year in 2013.

The eleventh annual G.A.N.G. Awards were held on March 28, 2013, at the Moscone Center. The show was recorded and broadcast via Twitch.

==== Overall ====
- Audio of the Year: Diablo III
- Best Cinematic/Cut-Scene Audio: Halo 4
- Best Handheld Audio: Uncharted: Golden Abyss
- Best Audio Mix: Far Cry 3
- Best Audio in a Casual/Indie/Social Game: Unfinished Swan

==== Music ====
- Music of the Year: Journey
- Best Interactive Score: Journey
- Best Original Instrumental Song: "Apotheosis" by Austin Wintory — Journey
- Best Original Vocal Song – Choral: "Main Theme" by Winifred Phillips — Assassin's Creed: Liberation
- Best Original Vocal Song – Pop: "I Was Born For This" — Journey
- Best Use of Licensed Music: LittleBigPlanet Karting
- Best Original Soundtrack Album: Journey

==== Sound Design and Voice Acting ====
- Sound Design of the Year: Halo 4
- Best Dialogue: Far Cry 3 and The Walking Dead (tie)

==== Recognition ====
- Lifetime Achievement Award: Clint Bajakian
- G.A.N.G. Recognition Award: Chance Thomas
- Student/Apprentice Competition Winners: Anastasia Devana (music composition) and Logan Byers (sound design)
- Rookie of the Year: Joel Corelitz and Jessica Curry
- Best Game Audio Article, Publication or Broadcast: "All in the Mix: The Importance of Real-Time Mixing in Video Games" by Garry Taylor
- Distinguished Service Awards: Alexander Davis

=== 12th (2014) ===
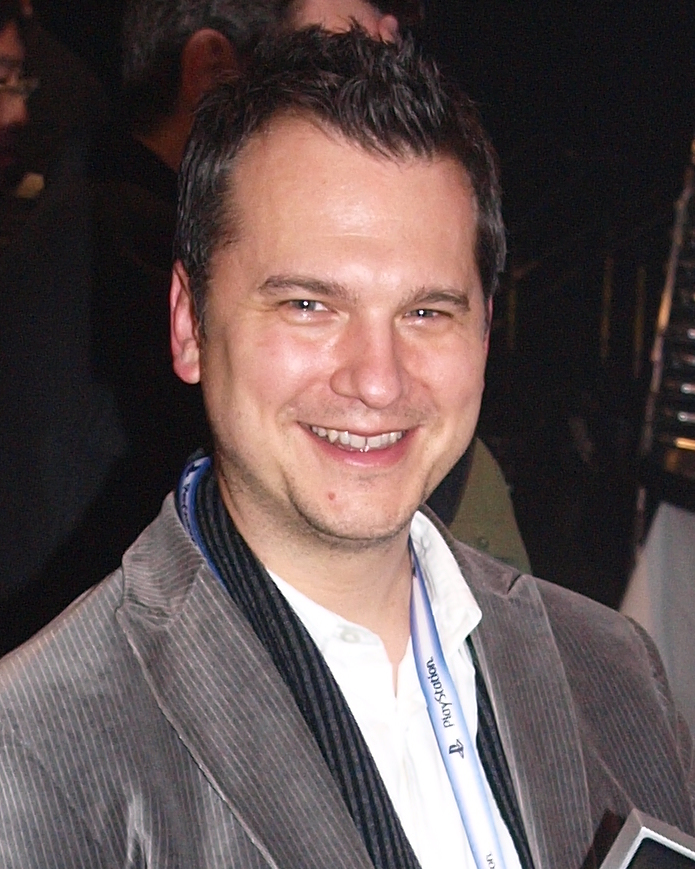
Phillip Kovats won Audio of the Year and Sound Design of the Year for his work as the audio lead on The Last of Us.

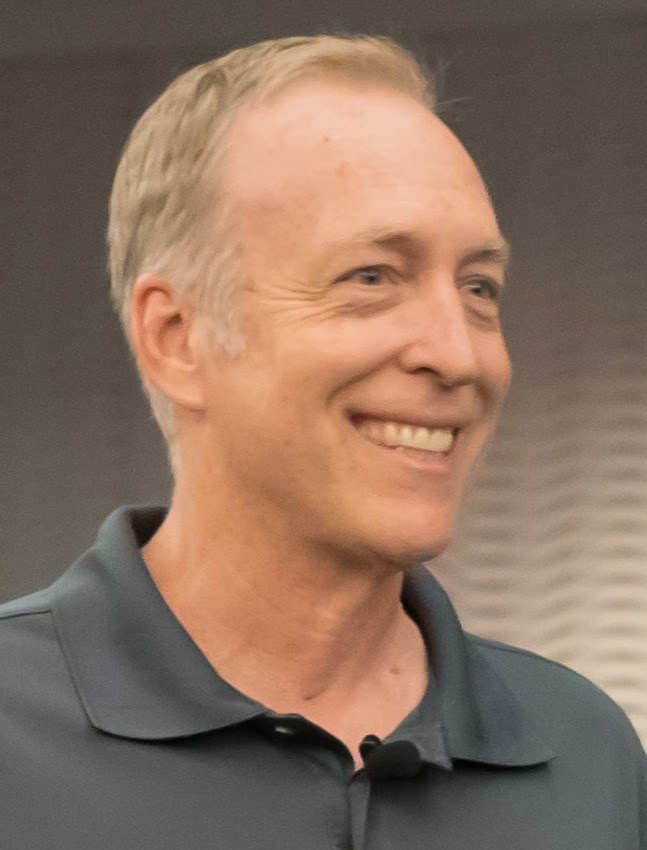
Eugene Jarvis was one of the two recipients of the G.A.N.G. Recognition Award in 2014.

The twelfth annual G.A.N.G. Awards were held on March 20, 2014, at the Moscone Center. The show was recorded and broadcast via Twitch. The Last of Us led the awards with three wins, while BioShock Infinite received two.

==== Overall ====
- Audio of the Year: The Last of Us
- Best Handheld Audio: Tearaway
- Best Cinematic Cutscene Audio: Starcraft II: Heart of the Swarm
- Best Audio Mix: The Last of Us
- Best Audio in a Casual/Indie/Social Game: Peggle 2

==== Music ====
- Music of the Year: BioShock Infinite
- Best Interactive Score: Peggle 2
- Best Original Instrumental Song: "Lighter Than Air" — BioShock Infinite
- Best Original Vocal Song – Choral: "Dieses Herz" — Amnesia: A Machine for Pigs
- Best Original Vocal Song – Pop: "Orchid's Theme" — Killer Instinct
- Best Use of Licensed Music: BioShock Infinite
- Best Original Soundtrack Album: Beyond: Two Souls and Halo: Spartan Assault (tie)

==== Sound Design and Voice Acting ====
- Sound Design of the Year: The Last of Us
- Best Dialogue: The Last of Us

==== Recognition ====
- G.A.N.G. Ambassador Award: Brandon Cole
- G.A.N.G. Recognition Award: Eugene Jarvis
- Lifetime Achievement Award: David Warhol
- Distinguished Service Award: Andrew Kane
- Student/Apprentice Award – Music: PJ Tracy
- Student/Apprentice Award – Sound Design: Andrew Villa
- Best Game Audio Article, Publication or Broadcast: "GDC Boot Camp XII"

=== 13th (2015) ===
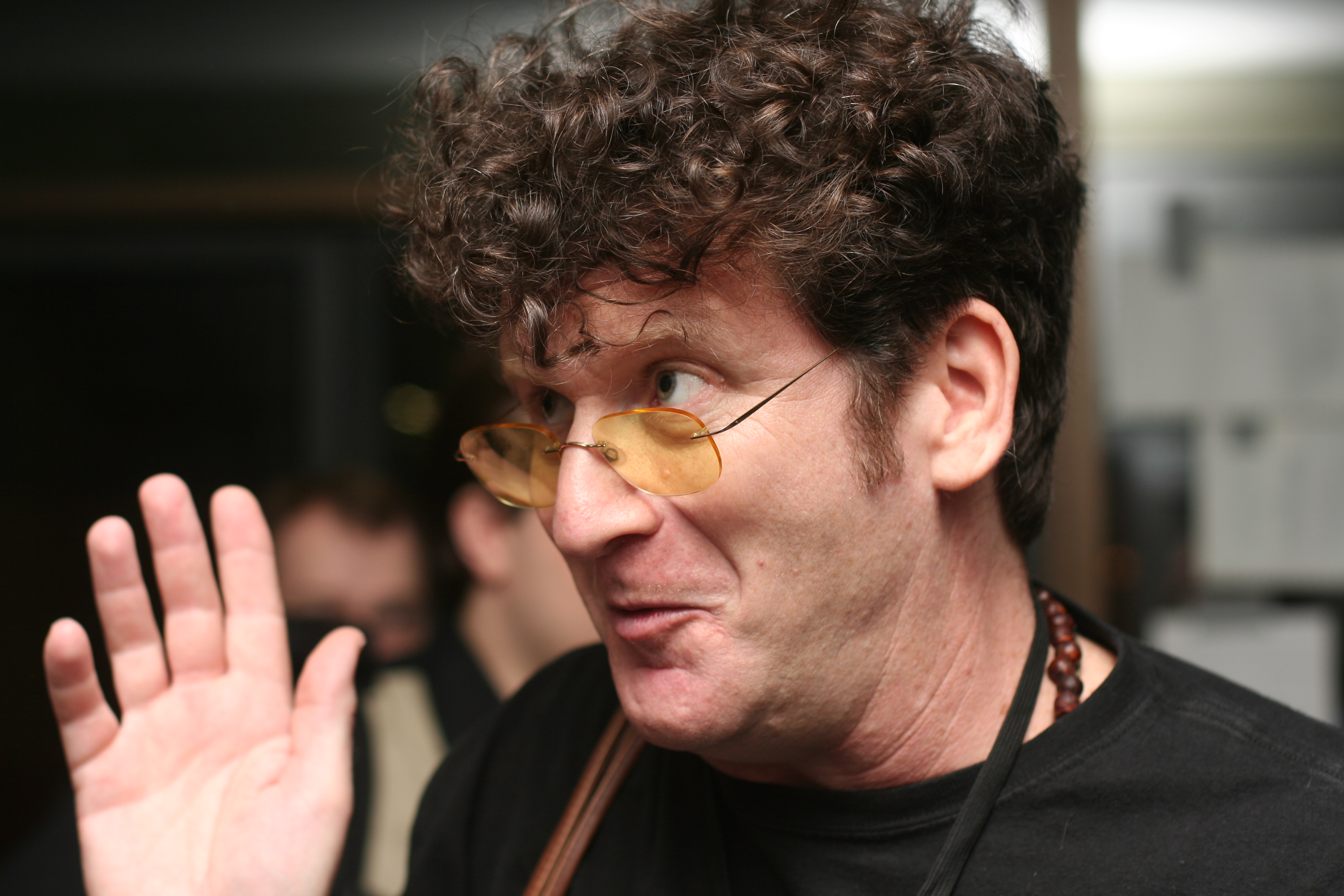
George "The Fat Man" Sanger won the Lifetime Achievement Award in 2015.

The thirteenth annual G.A.N.G. Awards were held on March 5, 2015, at the Moscone Center. George "The Fat Man" Sanger received two standing ovations as he accepted his Lifetime Achievement Award.

==== Overall ====
- Audio of the Year: Call of Duty: Advanced Warfare
- Best Cinematic/Cutscene Audio: The Last of Us: Left Behind
- Best Handheld Audio: Hearthstone: Heroes of Warcraft and Peggle Blast (tie)
- Best Audio for an Indie Game: The Banner Saga and Transistor (tie)
- Best Audio Mix: Alien: Isolation

==== Music ====
- Music of the Year: Destiny
- Best Interactive Score: Hohokum
- Best Original Instrumental: "Halo Theme Gungnir Mix" — Halo 2 Anniversary
- Best Original Vocal Song – Choral: "The Traveler/Excerpt from The Hope" — Destiny
- Best Original Vocal Song – Pop: "Hope for the Future" — Destiny
- Best Music in a Casual/Social Game: Peggle Blast
- Best Game Music Cover/Remix: The String Arcade

==== Sound Design ====
- Sound Design of the Year: Call of Duty: Advanced Warfare
- Best Sound Design in a Casual/Social Game: Hearthstone: Heroes of Warcraft

==== Voice Acting ====
- Best Dialogue: South Park: The Stick of Truth

==== Recognition ====
- G.A.N.G. Recognition Award: Emily Reese
- Student/Apprentice Competition Winners: George Shaw (music) and Thomas Couchard (sound design)
- Distinguished Service Awards: Richard Savery
- Lifetime Achievement Award: George "The Fat Man" Sanger
- Best Game Audio Article, Publication or Broadcast: "The Mix in The Last of Us"

=== 14th (2016) ===
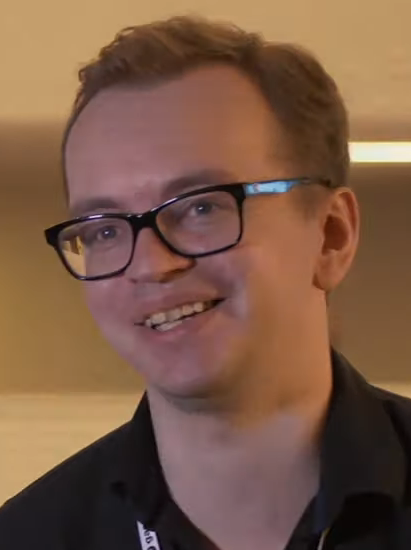
Gareth Coker won Rookie of the Year and Best Original Instrumental for his work on Ori and the Blind Forest.

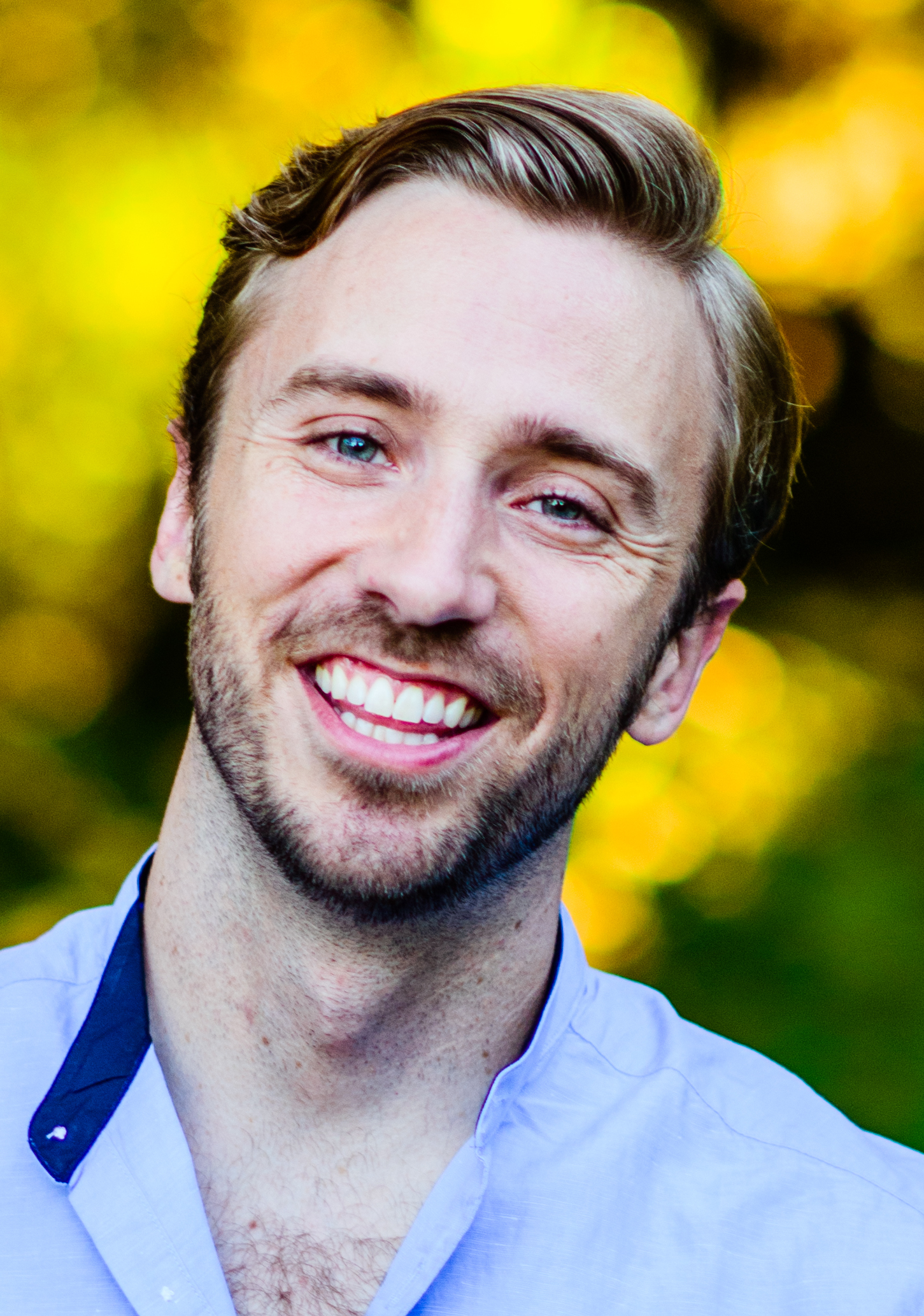
Peter Hollens won best Game Music Cover/Remix for his cover of "Underground" from Assassin's Creed Syndicate.

The fourteenth annual G.A.N.G. Awards were held on March 17, 2016, at the Moscone Center. Everybody's Gone to the Rapture led the nominees with six nominations, followed by Star Wars Battlefront with five and Ori and the Blind Forest with four.

==== Overall ====
- Audio of the Year: Ori and the Blind Forest
- Best Cinematic/Cutscene Audio: Starcraft II: Legacy of the Void
- Best Handheld Audio: Halo: Spartan Strike
- Best Audio for an Indie Game: Gathering Sky
- Best Audio Mix: Ori and the Blind Forest and Star Wars Battlefront (tie)

==== Music ====
- Music of the Year: Star Wars Battlefront
- Best Interactive Score: Star Wars Battlefront
- Best Original Instrumental: "Main Theme" — Ori and the Blind Forest
- Best Original Vocal Song – Choral: "The Light We Cast" — Everybody's Gone to the Rapture
- Best Original Vocal Song – Pop: "The Mourning Tree" — Everybody's Gone to the Rapture
- Best Original Soundtrack Album: Everybody's Gone to the Rapture
- Best Music in a Casual/Social Game: Honor of Kings
- Best Game Music Cover/Remix: "Underground" (Assassin's Creed Syndicate) by Peter Hollens

==== Sound Design ====
- Sound Design of the Year: Star Wars Battlefront
- Best Sound Design in a Casual/Social Game: Gathering Sky

==== Voice Acting ====
- Best Dialogue: Everybody's Gone to the Rapture

==== Recognition ====
- Rookie of the Year: Gareth Coker
- G.A.N.G. Recognition Award: Penka Kouneva
- Distinguished Service Awards: Savina Ciaramella and Chance Thomas
- Lifetime Achievement Award: Marty O'Donnell
- Best Game Audio Article, Publication or Broadcast: "Gathering Sky — Audio Journals 1-3" by Dren McDonald

=== 15th (2017) ===
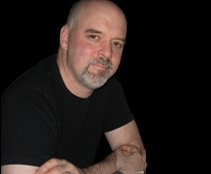
Peter McConnell won the Lifetime Achievement Award in 2017.

The fifteenth annual G.A.N.G. Awards were held on March 23, 2017, at the Moscone Center.

==== Overall ====
- Audio of the Year: Uncharted 4: A Thief's End
- Best Cinematic/Cutscene Audio: Uncharted 4: A Thief's End
- Best Handheld Audio: Hearthstone: One Night in Karazhan
- Best Audio for an Indie Game: Inside
- Best Audio Mix: Uncharted 4: A Thief's End

==== Music ====
- Music of the Year: Abzû
- Best Interactive Score: Fossil Echo
- Best Original Instrumental: The Last Guardian
- Best Original Vocal Song – Choral: "Then Were Created the Gods in the Mist of Heaven" — Abzû
- Best Original Vocal Song – Pop: "Our Steps, To the Night" — The Banner Saga 2
- Best Original Soundtrack Album: Abzû
- Best Music in a Casual/Social Game: "Realm of Valor" — Strike of Kings
- Best Game Music Cover/Remix: "Fated Children"

==== Sound Design ====
- Sound Design of the Year: Overwatch
- Best Sound Design in a Casual/Social Game: Hearthstone: One Night in Karazhan

==== Voice Acting ====
- Best Dialogue: Uncharted 4: A Thief's End

==== Recognition ====
- Rookie of the Year: John Robert Matz and Mikel Shane Prather
- G.A.N.G. Ambassador Award: Karen Collins
- G.A.N.G. Recognition Award: Liza Salta
- Distinguished Service Award: Stephan Schütze
- Lifetime Achievement Award: Peter McConnell
- Best Game Audio Article, Publication or Broadcast: "Overwatch — The Elusive Goal: Play by Sound"

=== 16th (2018) ===
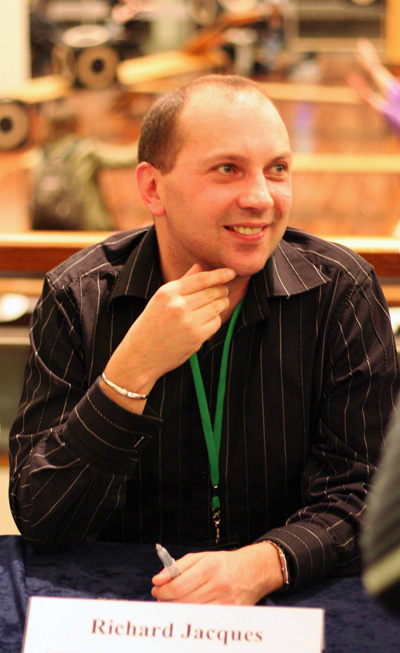
Richard Jacques won the Lifetime Achievement Award in 2018.

The sixteenth annual G.A.N.G. Awards were held on March 22, 2018, at the Moscone Center during the Game Developers Conference.

==== Overall ====
- Audio of the Year: Cuphead
- Best Cinematic/Cutscene Audio: Uncharted: The Lost Legacy
- Best Audio Mix: Uncharted: The Lost Legacy
- Best VR Audio: Resident Evil 7: Biohazard

==== Music ====
- Music of the Year: Call of Duty: WWII
- Best Interactive Score: Call of Duty: WWII
- Best Original Instrumental: "A Brotherhood of Heroes" (Call of Duty: WWII) and Horizon Zero Dawn (tie)
- Best Original Song: "Hearthstone is Home" — Hearthstone
- Best Original Choral Composition: Horizon Zero Dawn
- Best Original Soundtrack Album: Call of Duty: WWII
- Best Music in a Casual/Social Game: So Let Us Melt
- Best Music for an Indie Game: So Let Us Melt
- Best Game Music Cover/Remix: "Sword of Destiny" — The Witcher 3

==== Sound Design ====
- Sound Design of the Year: Call of Duty: WWII
- Best Sound Design in a Casual/Social Game: So Let Us Melt
- Best Sound Design for an Indie Game: Hellblade: Senua's Sacrifice

==== Voice Acting ====
- Best Dialogue: Uncharted: The Lost Legacy

==== Recognition ====
- Extraordinary Leadership and Service: Brian L. Schmidt
- Breakout Talent of the Year: Kristofer Maddigan
- G.A.N.G. Recognition Award: Sally-Anne Kellaway
- Distinguished Service Award: Spencer Bambrick
- Lifetime Achievement Award: Richard Jacques

=== 17th (2019) ===
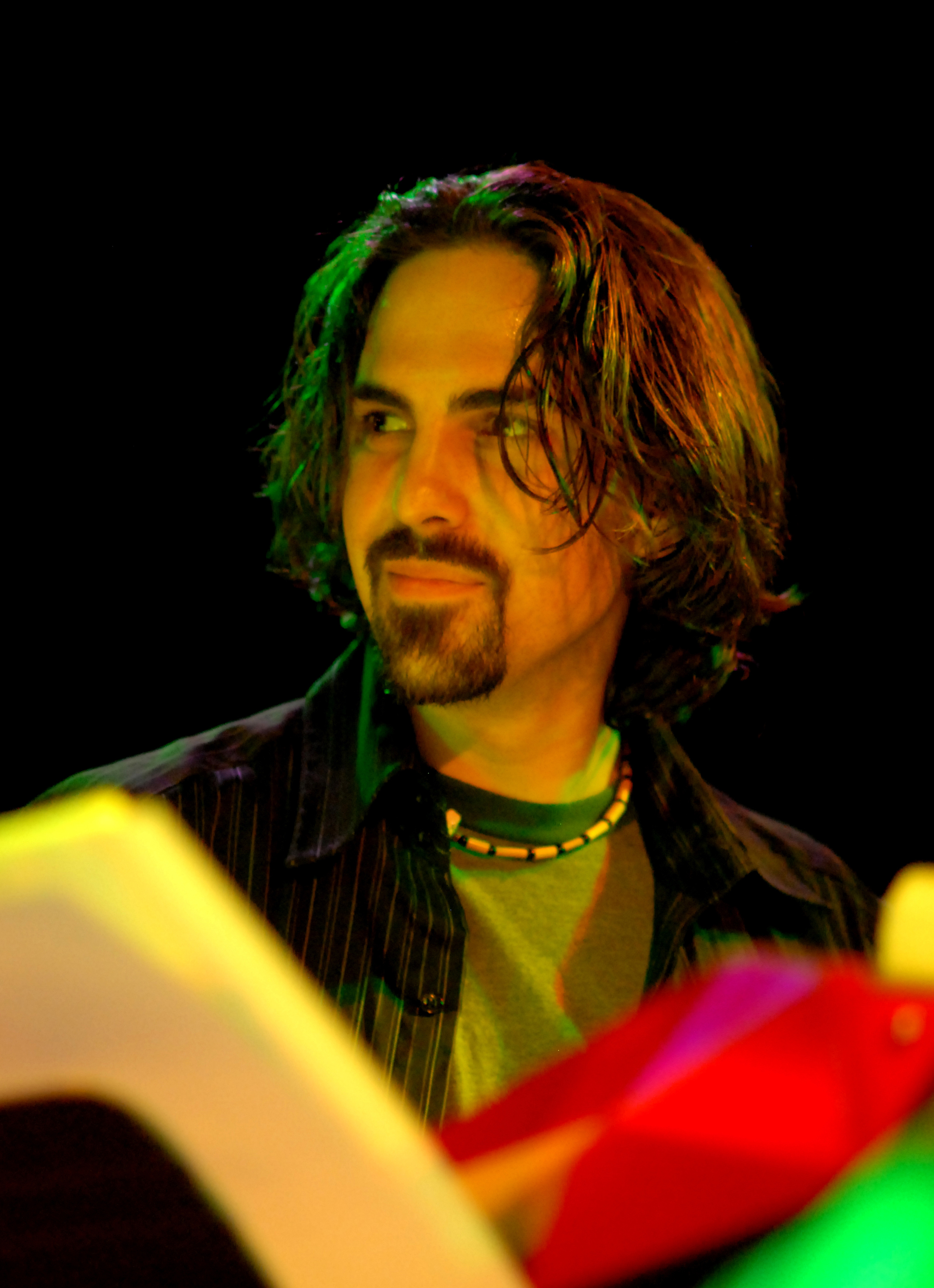
Bear McCreary won Music of the Year and Best Original Choral Composition for his work on God of War.

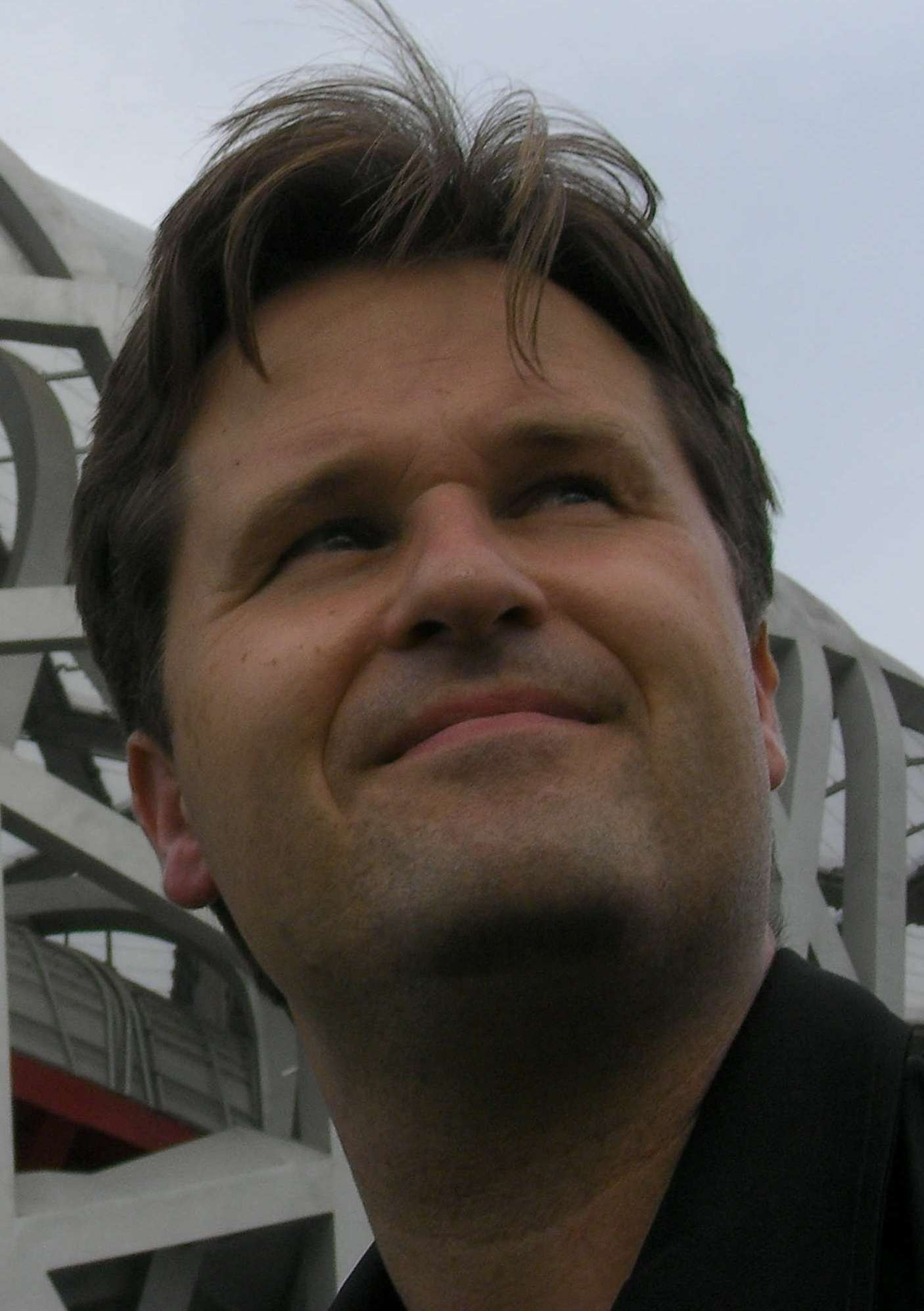
Philip Sheppard won Best Original Instrumental for "Kara Main Theme" from Detroit: Become Human.

The seventeenth annual G.A.N.G. Awards were held on March 21, 2019, at the Moscone Center. God of War led the winners with six awards.

==== Overall ====
- Audio of the Year: God of War
- Best Cinematic/Cutscene Audio: God of War
- Best Audio Mix: God of War
- Best VR Audio: Moss
- G.A.N.G. / MAGFEST People's Choice Award: Celeste and Octopath Traveler (tie)

==== Music ====
- Music of the Year: God of War
- Best Original Soundtrack Album: Shadow of the Tomb Raider
- Best Interactive Score: Shadow of the Tomb Raider
- Best Original Instrumental: "Kara Main Theme" — Detroit: Become Human
- Best Music in a Casual/Social Game: Hearthstone: The Boomsday Project
- Best Music for an Indie Game: Moss
- Best Original Song: "Waiting" — Battle Through the Heaven
- Best Original Choral Composition: "Lullaby of the Giants" — God of War
- Best Game Music Cover/Remix: "Super Mario Bros." — ConSoul

==== Sound Design ====
- Sound Design of the Year: God of War
- Best Sound Design in a Casual/Social Game: Hearthstone: The Boomsday Project
- Best Sound Design for an Indie Game: Moss

==== Voice Acting ====
- Best Dialogue: Marvel's Spider-Man

==== Recognition ====
- G.A.N.G. Recognition Award: Damian Kastbauer
- Distinguished Service Award: Becky Allen
- Lifetime Achievement Award: Elise Baldwin
- Best Game Audio Article, Publication or Broadcast: "Soundworks Collection Video: Shadow of the Tomb Raider" by Michael Coleman, Rob Bridgett, Frédéric Arnaud, Hugo Léger, Anne-Sophie Mongeau, Brian D'Oliveira

=== 18th (2020) ===
The eighteenth annual G.A.N.G. Awards were held on May 6, 2020. Due to the COVID-19 pandemic, the event was held virtually for the first time. It was hosted by Wilbert Roget, II and Cody Matthew Johnson, and had a pre- and post-show. Death Stranding swept the show with six wins, including Audio of the Year, Sound Design of the Year, and Best Dialogue.

==== Overall ====
- Audio of the Year: Death Stranding
- Best Cinematic/Cutscene Audio: Death Stranding
- Best Virtual Reality Audio: Journey of the Gods
- Best Audio Mix: Call of Duty: Modern Warfare and Death Stranding (tie)
- G.A.N.G. / MAFEST People's Choice Award: Cadence of Hyrule

==== Music ====
- Music of the Year: Star Wars Jedi: Fallen Order
- Best Interactive Score: Erica
- Best Music for an Indie Game: Bee Simulator
- Best Original Instrumental: "Erica Know Thyself" by Austin Wintory — Erica
- Best Original Song: "Giants" by Jared Lee, Jessica Karpov, Kole Hicks, Umar Ibrahim — League of Legends
- Best Original Choral Composition: "Cordova's Theme" by Gordy Haab and Stephen Barton — Star Wars Jedi: Fallen Order
- Best Original Soundtrack Album: Death Stranding
- Best Music in a Casual/Social Game: Honor of Kings 2.0
- Best Game Music Cover/Remix: "The Trial" (Chrono Trigger) by John Robert Matz

==== Sound Design ====
- Sound Design of the Year: Death Stranding
- Best Sound Design in a Casual/Social Game: Call of Duty: Mobile
- Best Sound Design for an Indie Game: Deliver Us the Moon

==== Voice Acting ====
- Best Dialogue: Death Stranding
- Best Dialogue for an Indie Game: Golem

==== Recognition ====
- Breakout Talent Award: Laryssa Okada
- G.A.N.G. Recognition Award: Guy Whitmore
- Distinguished Service Award: Emmanuel Lagumbay
- Best Game Audio Article, Publication or Broadcast: "100 Unusual, Novel, Surprising Ways to be a Better Sound Designer in Video Games" by Rob Bridgett

=== 19th (2021) ===
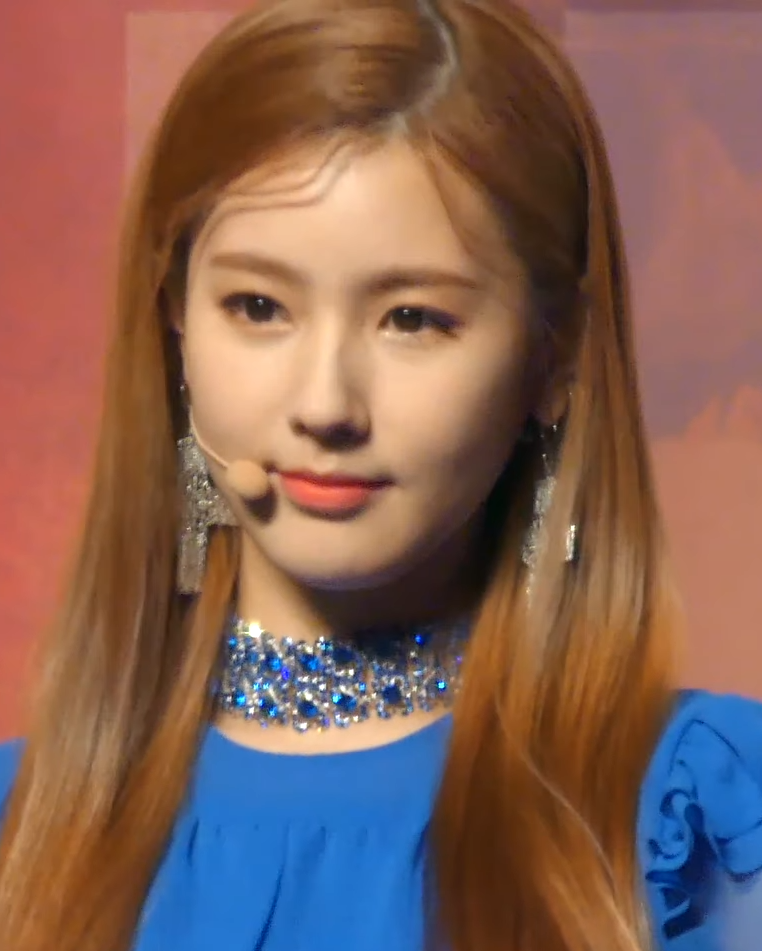
Miyeon of (G)I-dle

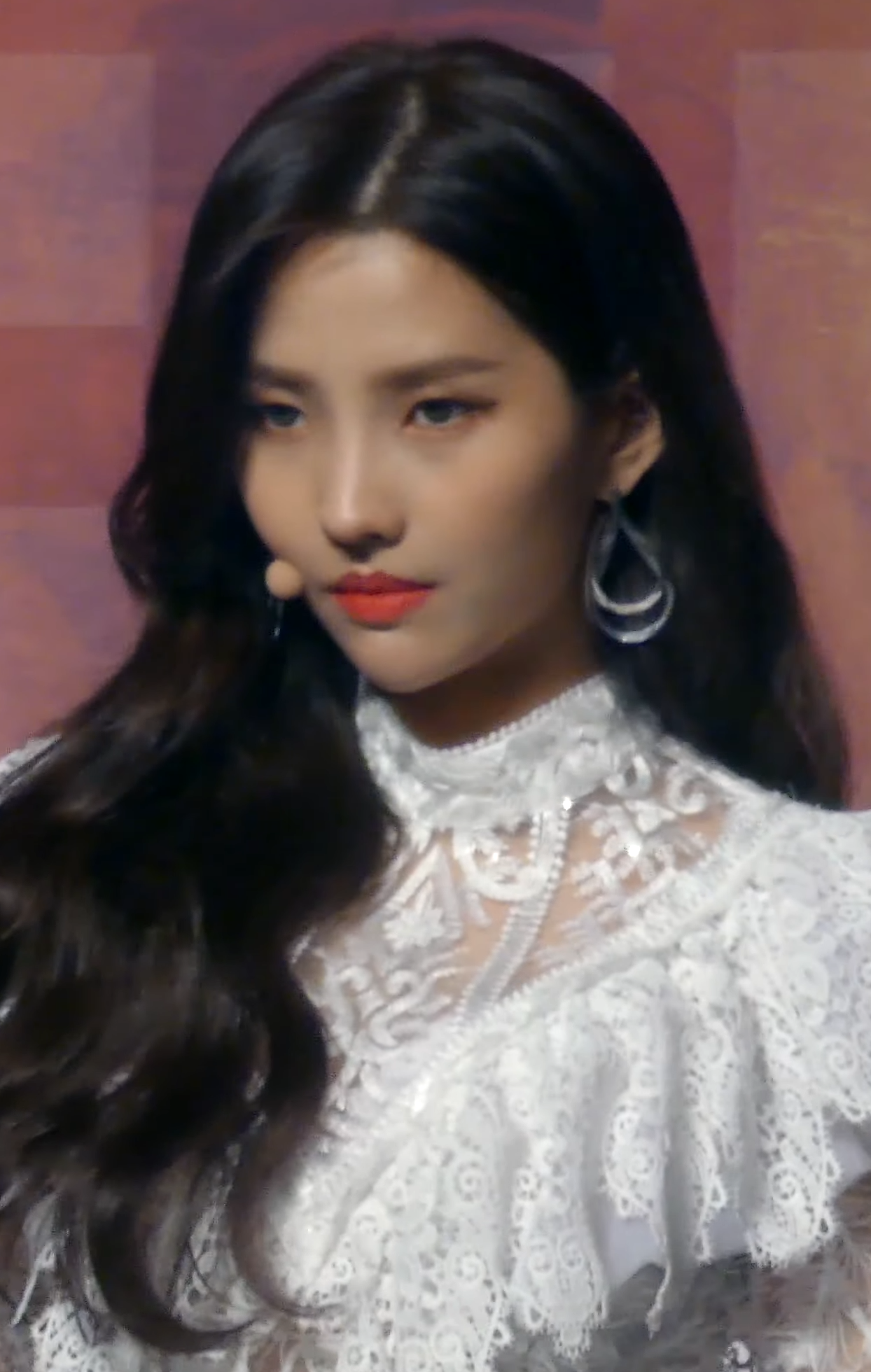
Soyeon of (G)I-dle

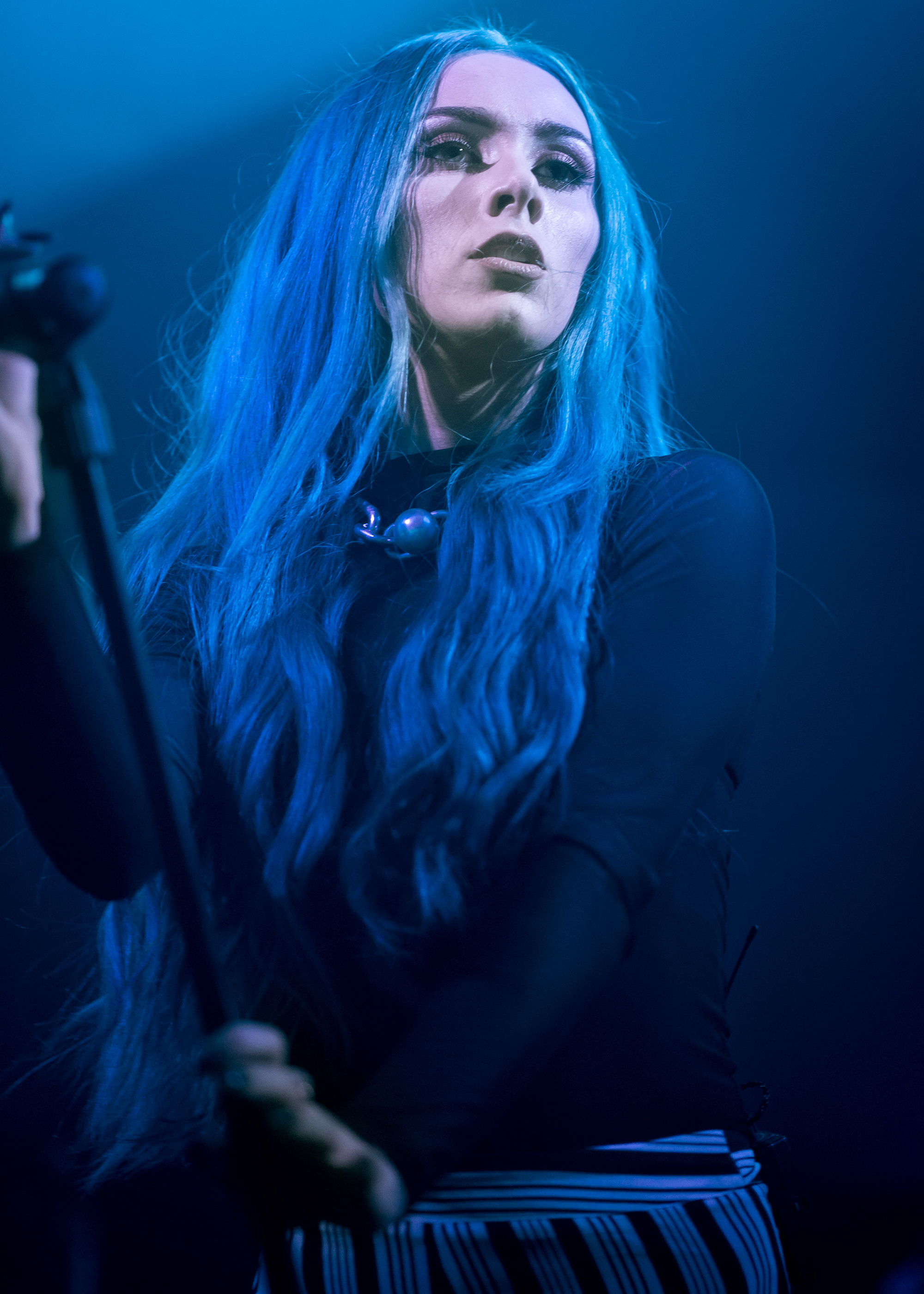
Jaira Burns

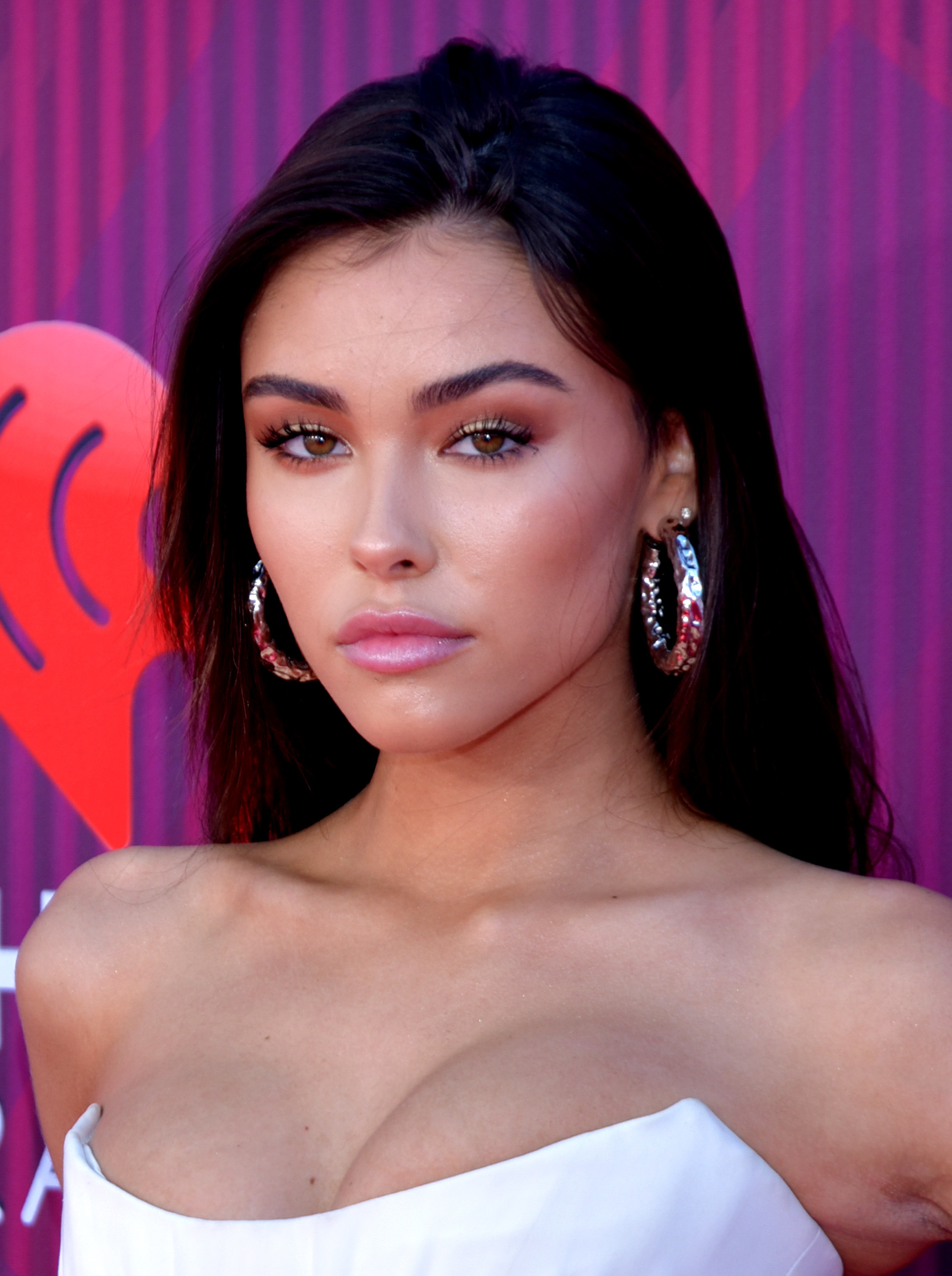
Madison Beer

Miyeon, Soyeon, Burns, and Beer—performers from the virtual band K/DA—were among the winners of Best Original Song for their work on "More" from League of Legends.

The nineteenth annual G.A.N.G. Awards took place on April 28, 2021. Due to COVID-19 pandemic, the show was held virtually for the second time, hosted by Rachel Ribison and Cody Matthew Johnson. Musical guests included the Video Game Orchestra and 88bit. The Last of Us Part II led the show with 15 nominations and eight wins, followed by Ghost of Tsushima with 14 nominations and five wins, Hades with 12 nominations and three wins, and Marvel's Spider-Man: Miles Morales with 11 nominations. Guy Whitmore received the Lifetime Achievement Award.

==== Overall ====
- Audio of the Year: The Last of Us Part II
- Best Audio for a Casual or Social Game: Game for Peace: Meteor Strike
- Best Audio for an Indie Game: Hades
- Best New Original IP Audio: Ghost of Tsushima
- Best Cinematic and Cutscene Audio: Final Fantasy VII Remake
- Best Game Trailer Audio: Cyberpunk 2077
- Excellence in Audio Accessibility: The Last of Us Part II
- Excellence in VR Audio: Half-Life: Alyx, The Last Light, and The Walking Dead: Saints & Sinners (tie)
- Best Audio Mix: The Last of Us Part II

==== Music ====
- Music of the Year: Star Wars: Squadrons
- Creative and Technical Achievement in Music: Ghost of Tsushima
- Best Music for an Indie Game: The Pathless
- Best Original Soundtrack Album: Mythgard
- Best Physical Soundtrack Release: The Music of Destiny: Volume II Collector's Edition Vinyl Box Set
- Best Main Theme: "Main Theme" by Kazumi Totaka — Animal Crossing: New Horizons
- Best Original Song: "More", music by Rebecca Johnson, Sebastien Najand, Riot Music Team, and Bekuh BOOM; performed by K/DA ((G)I-dle, Jaira Burns, Lexie Liu, Madison Beer, and Seraphine) — League of Legends
- Best Game Music Cover or Remix: "嘘でしょ！コンビは熊と鳥！？(It Can’t Be True! A Bear and a Bird Working Together?!)" by Jeff Penny

==== Sound Design ====
- Sound Design of the Year: Ghost of Tsushima and The Last of Us Part II (tie)
- Creative and Technical Achievement in Sound Design: The Last of Us Part II
- Best Game Foley: Ghost of Tsushima
- Best Sound Design for an Indie Game: Hades
- Best UI, Reward or Objective Sound Design: Animal Crossing: New Horizons

==== Voice Acting ====
- Dialogue of the Year: The Last of Us Part II
- Best Dialogue for an Indie Game: Hades
- Best Voice Performance: Kazuya Nakai as Jin Sakai — Ghost of Tsushima
- Best Ensemble Cast Performance: The Last of Us Part II
- Best Non-Humanoid Performance: Bugsnax

==== Recognition ====
- Best Game Audio Article or Publication: The Last of Us Part II Sound Interview — A Sound Effect
- Best Game Audio Presentation, Podcast or Broadcast: "How to Get Hired a Second Time" by Jesse Harlin — GameSoundCon 2020

=== 20th (2022) ===
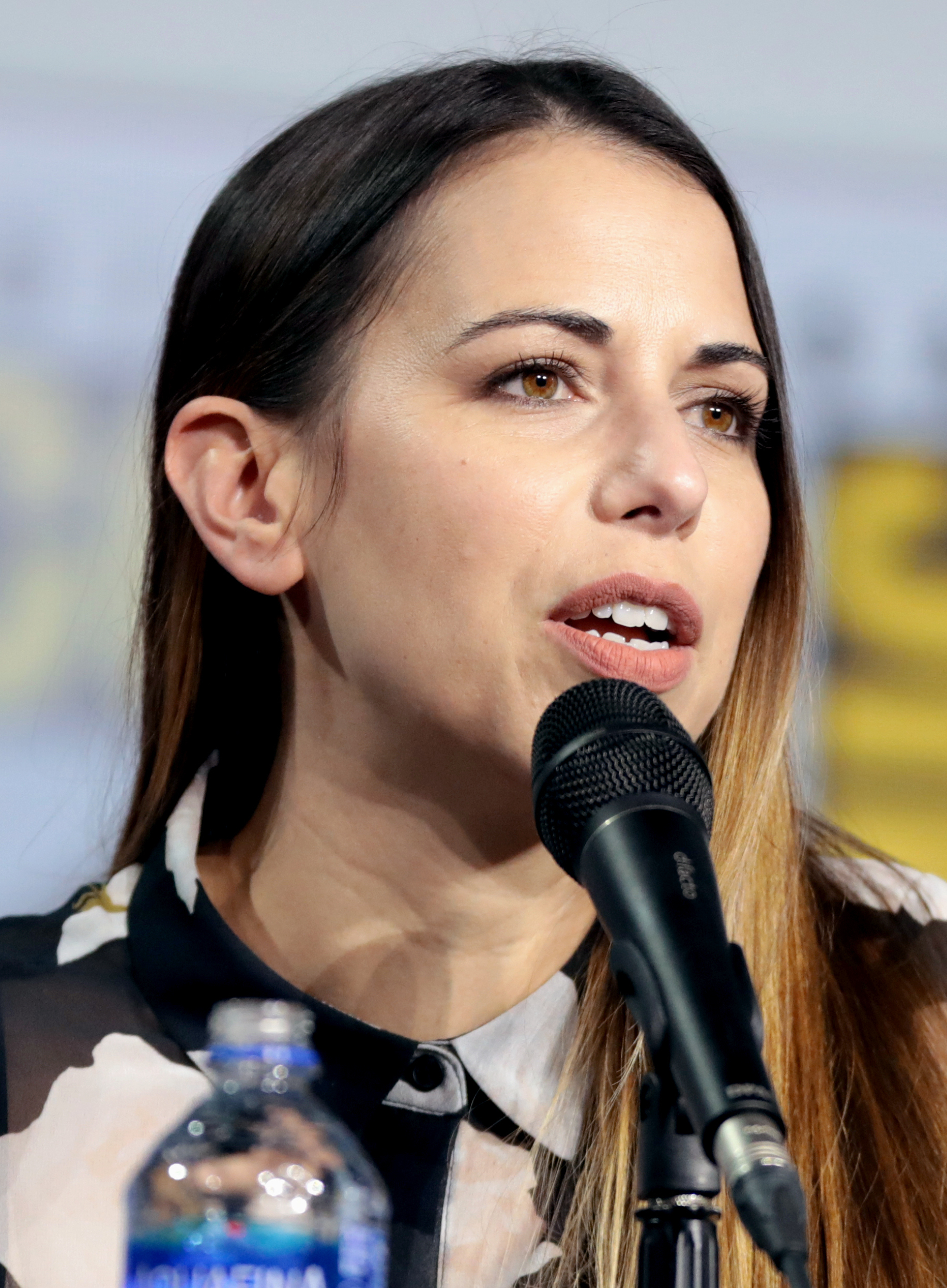
Laura Bailey won Best Performance for her role as Polina Petrova in Call of Duty: Vanguard.

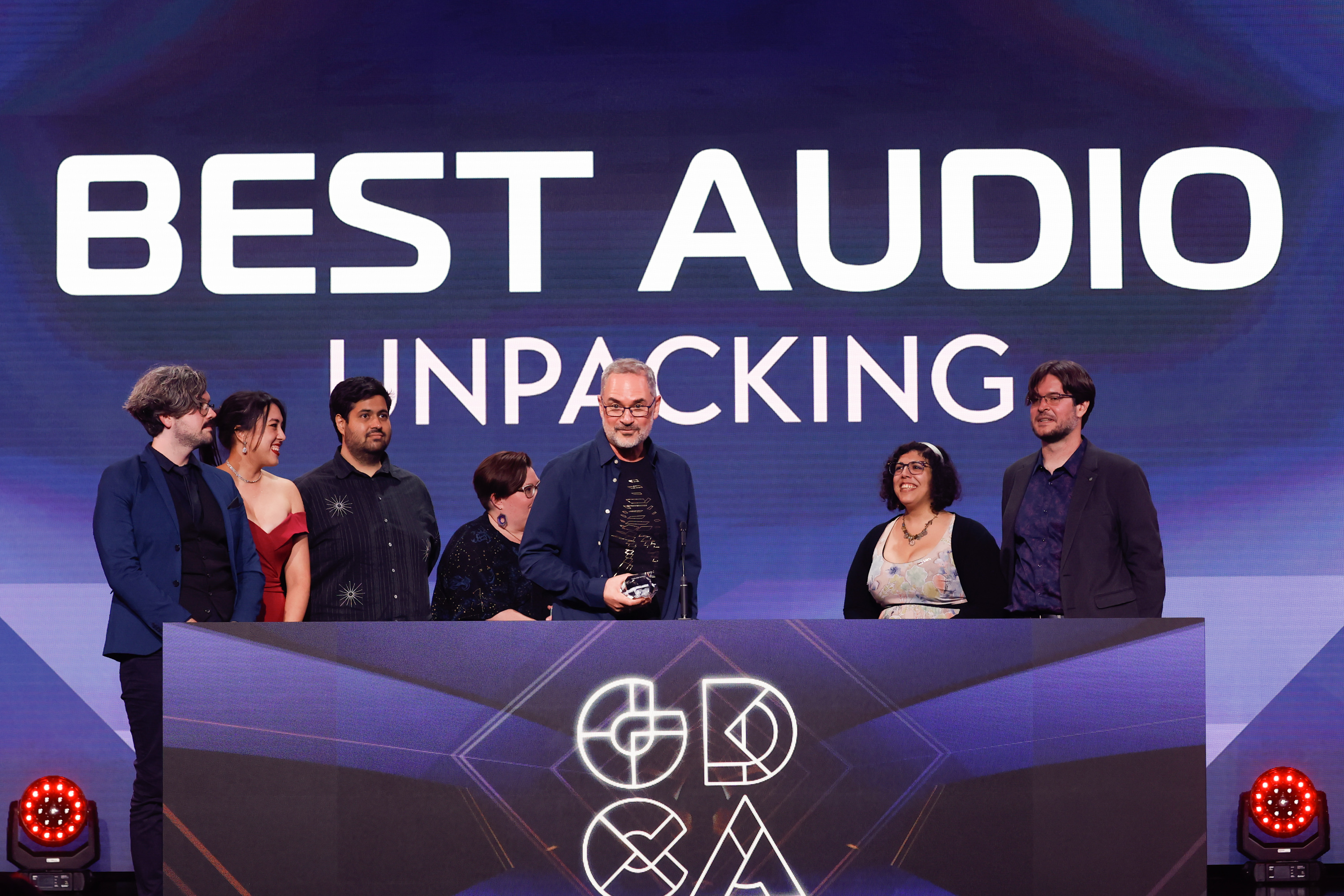
Unpacking won Best Audio for an Indie Game and Best Sound Design for an Indie Game.

The twentieth annual G.A.N.G. Awards took place on May 25, 2022. Due to COVID-19 pandemic, the show was held virtually for the third time, hosted by Jason E. Kelley. Musical guests included 88bit and Raphael Batista. Call of Duty: Vanguard led the nominees with ten nominations, and Ratchet & Clank: Rift Apart led the winners with four awards, including Audio of the Year. Leslie Ann Jones won the Lifetime Achievement Award, and G.A.N.G. vice president Sabrina Hutchinson won the Distinguished Service Award.

==== Overall ====
- Audio of the Year: Ratchet & Clank: Rift Apart
- Best Audio for a Casual or Social Game: Honor of Kings
- Best Audio for an Indie Game: Unpacking
- Best New Original IP Audio: Returnal
- Best Cinematic and Cutscene Audio: Returnal
- Best Game Trailer Audio: God of War Ragnarök — PlayStation Showcase 2021 Reveal Trailer
- Excellence in Audio Accessibility: Blind Drive and Halo Infinite (tie)

==== Music ====
- Music of the Year: Marvel's Guardians of the Galaxy
- Creative and Technical Achievement in Music: Returnal
- Best Music for an Indie Game: Outer Wilds: Echoes of the Eye
- Best Original Soundtrack Album: It Takes Two
- Best Physical Soundtrack Release: Halo Infinite
- Best Main Theme: "Beneath Worlds" — Kena: Bridge of Spirits
- Best Original Song: "Déjà Vu" by Sencit and FJØRA — Deathloop
- Best Game Music Cover or Remix: "Gerudo Valley" — The Legend of Zelda: Ocarina of Time

==== Sound Design ====
- Sound Design of the Year: Returnal
- Creative and Technical Achievement in Sound Design: Ratchet & Clank: Rift Apart
- Best Game Foley: Call of Duty: Vanguard
- Best Sound Design for an Indie Game: Unpacking
- Best UI, Reward or Objective Sound Design: Ratchet & Clank: Rift Apart

==== Voice Acting ====
- Dialogue of the Year: Ratchet & Clank: Rift Apart
- Best Dialogue for an Indie Game: Disco Elysium: The Final Cut
- Best Voice Performance: Laura Bailey as Polina Petrova — Call of Duty: Vanguard
- Best Ensemble Cast Performance: Marvel's Guardians of the Galaxy
- Best Non-Humanoid Performance: Returnal

==== Recognition ====
- Lifetime Achievement Award: Leslie Ann Jones
- Distinguished Service Award: Sabrina Hutchinson
- Best Game Audio Article or Publication: Leading With Sound by Rob Bridgett
- Best Game Audio Presentation, Podcast or Broadcast: "Returnal with Loic Couthier & Toivo Kallio" — Tonebenders Sound Design Podcast

=== 21st (2023) ===
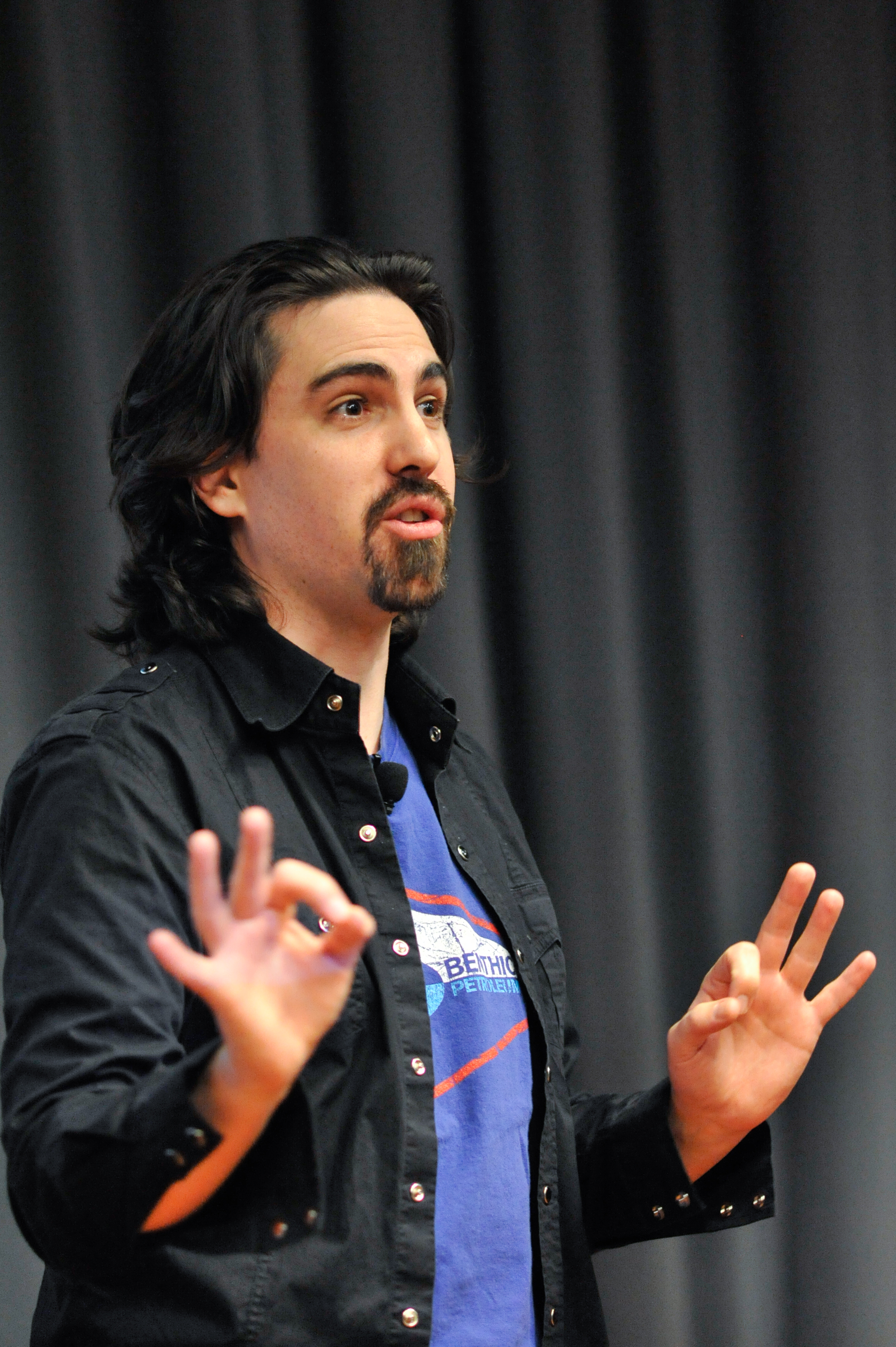
Bear McCreary's work on God of War Ragnarök won Music of the Year, Creative and Technical Achievement in Music, Best Original Soundtrack Album, Best Main Theme (tie), and Best Original Song.

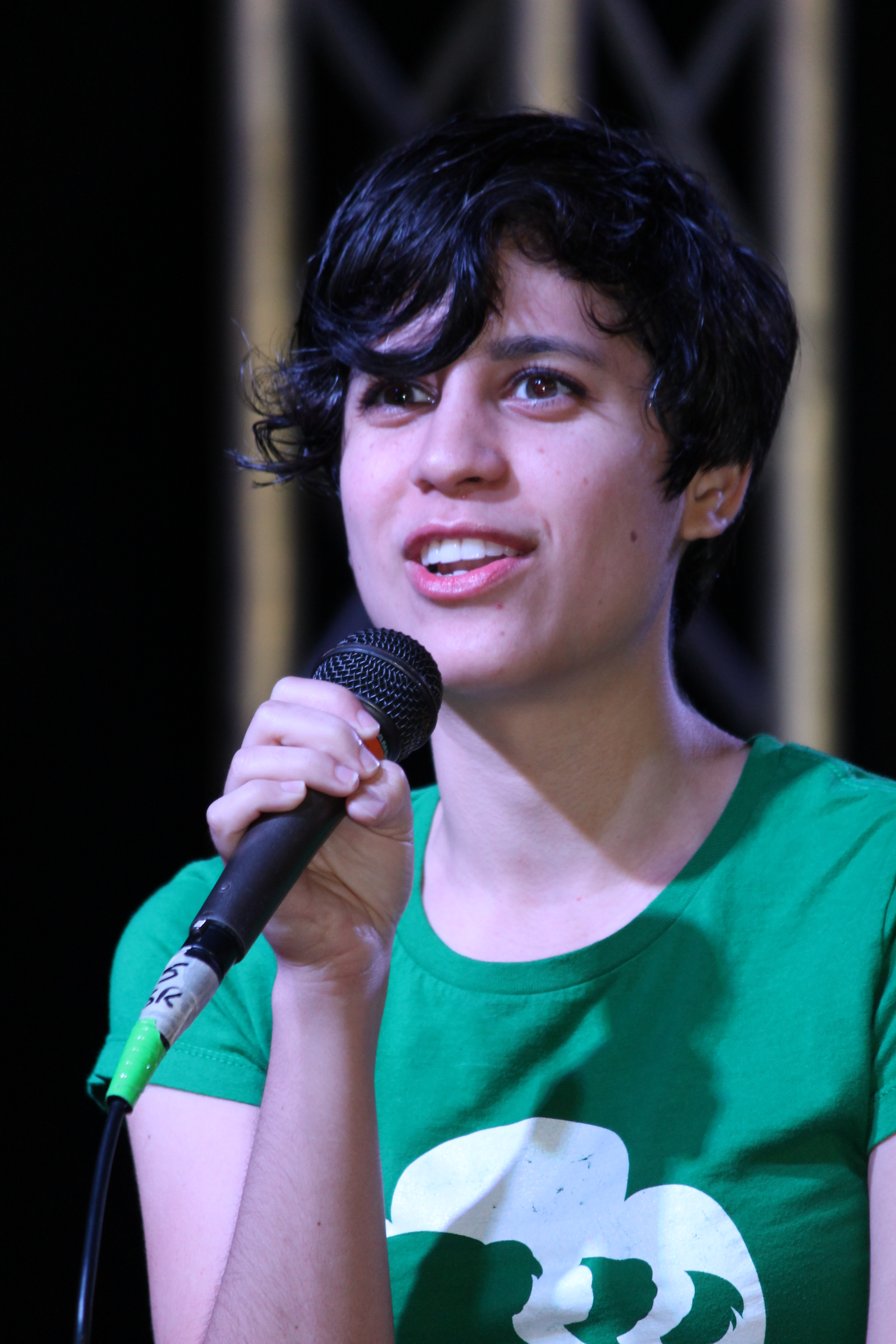
Ashly Burch won Best Voice Performance for her role as Aloy in Horizon Forbidden West.

The 21st annual G.A.N.G. Awards took place on March 23, 2023. For the first time since 2019, the ceremony returned to the Moscone Center. Submissions opened on December 17, 2022, and nominees were announced on February 9, 2023. Paul Lipson, former G.A.N.G. president, received the Lifetime Achievement Award. God of War Ragnarök won all 14 of its nominations, representing more than half of the awards.

==== Overall ====
- Audio of the Year: God of War Ragnarök
- Best Audio for a Casual or Social Game: Honor of Kings
- Best Audio for an Indie Game: Moss: Book II
- Best Audio Mix: God of War Ragnarök
- Best New Original IP Audio: The Callisto Protocol
- Best Cinematic and Cutscene Audio: God of War Ragnarök
- Best Game Trailer Audio: God of War Ragnarök

==== Music ====
- Music of the Year: God of War Ragnarök
- Creative and Technical Achievement in Music: God of War Ragnarök
- Best Music for an Indie Game: Moss: Book II
- Best Original Soundtrack Album: God of War Ragnarök
- Best Physical Soundtrack Release: Returnal (Original Soundtrack)
- Best Main Theme: "God of War Ragnarök" (God of War Ragnarök) and "Haiyue Theme" (Honor of Kings)
- Best Original Song: "God of War Ragnarök" (God of War Ragnarök)
- Best Game Music Cover or Remix: "Dire Dire Docks (from Super Mario 64)" (Rob Kovacs, 88bit, Rob Anderson, Save Point) and "The Final Battle" (Rozen + Reven) (tie)

==== Sound Design ====
- Sound Design of the Year: God of War Ragnarök
- Creative and Technical Achievement in Sound Design: God of War Ragnarök
- Best Game Foley: God of War Ragnarök
- Best Sound Design for an Indie Game: Stray
- Best UI, Reward or Objective Sound Design: God of War Ragnarök

==== Voice Acting ====
- Dialogue of the Year: God of War Ragnarök
- Best Dialogue for an Indie Game: Moss: Book II
- Best Voice Performance: Ashly Burch as Aloy — Horizon Forbidden West
- Best Ensemble Cast Performance: Horizon Forbidden West

==== Recognition ====
- Lifetime Achievement Award: Paul Lipson
- G.A.N.G. Recognition Award: Kevin Regamey and Matthew Marteinsson
- Best Game Audio Article or Publication: The Audio Source Magazine: Women in Game Audio Edition (Fall 2022)
- Best Game Audio Presentation, Podcast or Broadcast: Interactive Mixing: The Next Frontier in Game Audio (Loic Couthier and Rob Bridgett)

=== 22nd (2024) ===
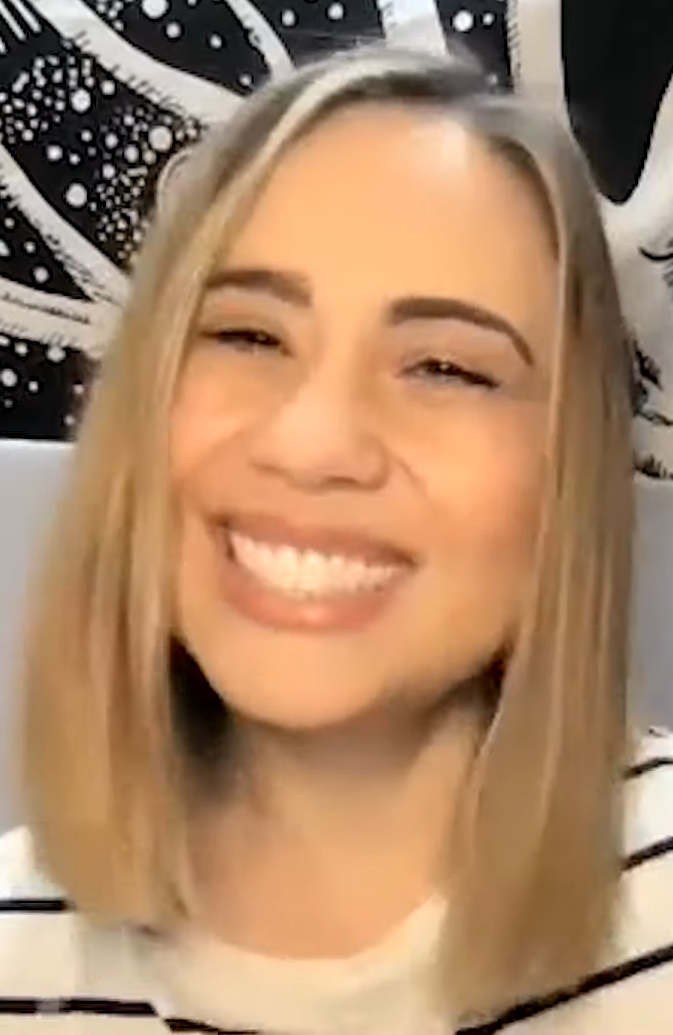
Samantha Béart won Best Voice Performance for her role as Karlach in Baldur's Gate 3.

The 22nd Annual G.A.N.G. Awards took place on March 21, 2024, at the Moscone Center, hosted by Fran Mirabella and Morla Gorrondona. Nominees were announced on December 13, 2023. Steve Schnur received the Lifetime Achievement Award. The G.A.N.G. Recognition Award was renamed the Bob Rice Recognition Award in memory of former board member Bob Rice, who died in 2023; it was awarded to the American Society of Composers, Authors, and Publishers. Star Wars Jedi: Survivor led the winners with seven awards.

==== Overall ====
- Audio of the Year: Star Wars Jedi: Survivor
- Best Audio for a Casual or Social Game: Diablo Immortal
- Best Audio for an Indie Game: Tchia
- Best Audio Mix of the Year: Star Wars Jedi: Survivor
- Best New Original IP Audio: Stray Gods: The Roleplaying Musical
- Best Cinematic and Cutscene Audio: Diablo IV
- Best Game Trailer Audio: Diablo IV

==== Music ====
- Music of the Year: Star Wars Jedi: Survivor
- Creative and Technical Achievement in Music: Stray Gods: The Roleplaying Musical
- Best Music for an Indie Game: Stray Gods: The Roleplaying Musical
- Best Original Soundtrack Album: Star Wars Jedi: Survivor
- Best Main Theme: Baldur's Gate 3
- Best Original Song: "Adrift" (Stray Gods: The Roleplaying Musical)
- Best Game Music Cover or Remix: "Song of Storms" (Gentle Game Lullabies, Andrea Vanzo)

==== Sound Design ====
- Sound Design of the Year: Star Wars Jedi: Survivor
- Creative and Technical Achievement in Sound Design: Star Wars Jedi: Survivor
- Best Game Foley: Diablo IV
- Best Sound Design for an Indie Game: Season: A Letter to the Future
- Best UI, Reward or Objective Sound Design: Star Wars Jedi: Survivor

==== Voice Acting ====
- Dialogue of the Year: Baldur's Gate 3
- Best Dialogue for an Indie Game: Bramble: The Mountain King
- Best Voice Performance: Samantha Béart as Karlach — Baldur's Gate 3
- Best Ensemble Cast Performance: Baldur's Gate 3

==== Recognition ====
- Lifetime Achievement Award: Steve Schnur
- Bob Rice Recognition Award: American Society of Composers, Authors, and Publishers
- Best Game Audio Article or Publication: Game Audio Mixing: Insights to Improve Your Mixing Performance (Alex Riviere, Routledge)
- Best Game Audio Presentation, Podcast, or Broadcast: Game Developers Conference 2023 — "The Art of the Theme" (Brendon Williams, Jason Walsh)

=== 23rd (2025) ===
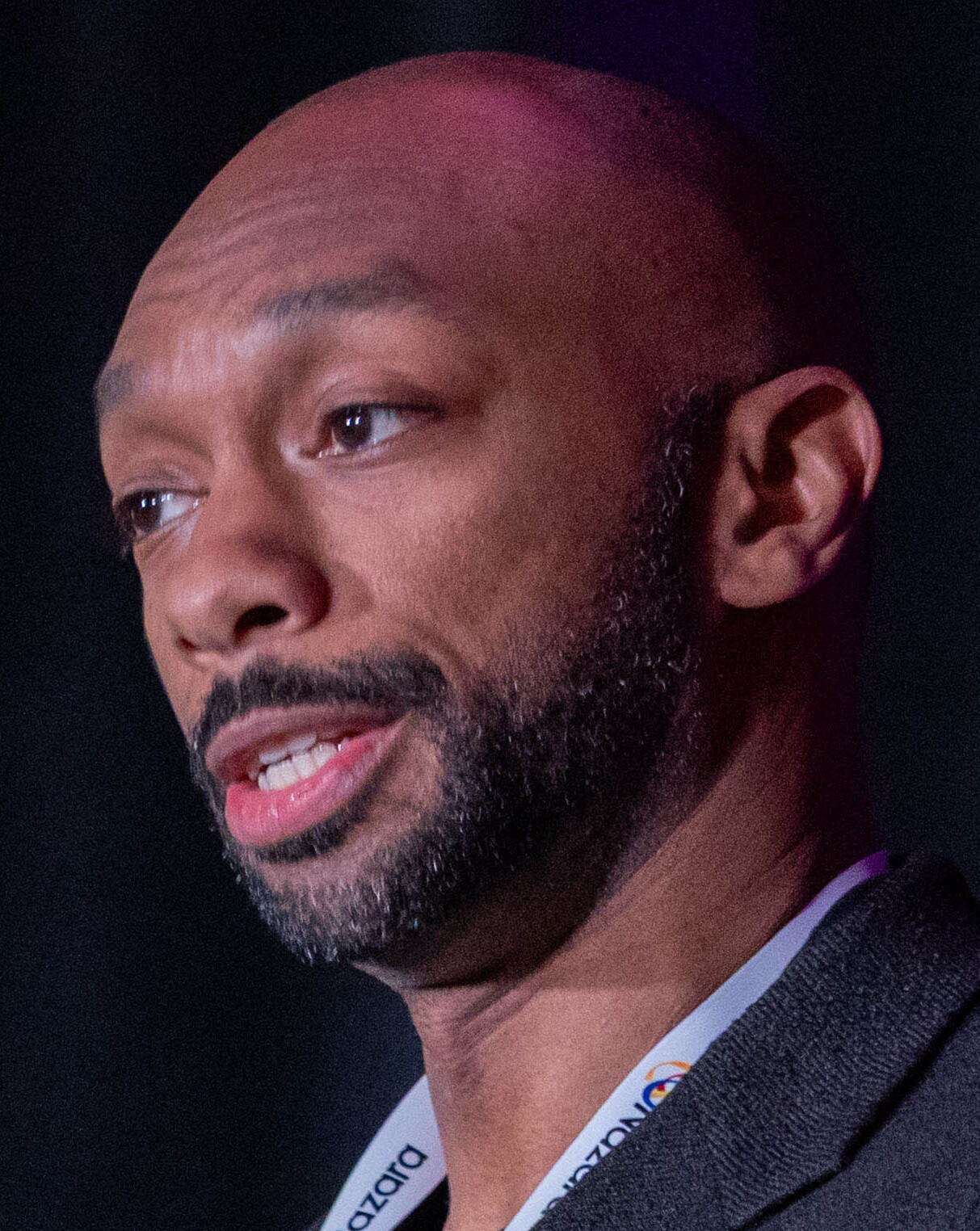
Wilbert Roget II's work on Star Wars Outlaws (alongside Jon Everist and Kazuma Jinnouchi) won Music of the Year, Creative and Technical Achievement in Music (tie), Best Original Soundtrack Album, and Best Main Theme (tie).

The 23rd Annual G.A.N.G. Awards took place on March 20, 2025, at the Moscone Center. Nominees were announced on December 17, 2024. Scott Gershin received the Lifetime Achievement Award, and Jennissary received the Bob Rice Recognition Award. Star Wars Outlaws led the winners with five awards, including two ties. The show had four ties overall, including Audio of the Year for Astro Bot and Need for Speed Mobile.

==== Overall ====
- Audio of the Year: Astro Bot and Need for Speed Mobile (tie)
- Best Audio for a Casual or Social Game: Need for Speed Mobile
- Best Audio for an Indie Game: The Outlast Trials
- Best Audio Mix: Senua's Saga: Hellblade II
- Best New Original IP Audio: Hauntii
- Best Cinematic and Cutscene Audio: Marvel's Spider-Man 2
- Best Game Trailer Audio: Helldivers 2

==== Music ====
- Music of the Year: Star Wars Outlaws
- Creative and Technical Achievement in Music: Final Fantasy VII Rebirth and Star Wars Outlaws (tie)
- Best Music for an Indie Game: Frostpunk 2
- Best Original Soundtrack Album: Star Wars Outlaws
- Best Main Theme: Helldivers 2 and Star Wars Outlaws (tie)
- Best Original Song: "This Cantina Can't Contain Us" (Star Wars Outlaws)
- Best Game Music Cover: "Song of Storms (Lofi Remix)" (Gentle Game Lullabies, Andrea Vanzo, suteki)

==== Sound Design ====
- Sound Design of the Year: Call of Duty: Modern Warfare III
- Creative and Technical Achievement in Sound Design: Delta Force and Final Fantasy VII Rebirth (tie)
- Best Game Foley: Marvel's Spider-Man 2
- Best Sound Design for an Indie Game: The Outlast Trials
- Best UI, Reward, or Objective Sound Design: Astro Bot

==== Voice Acting ====
- Dialogue of the Year: Marvel's Spider-Man 2
- Best Dialogue for an Indie Game: Indika
- Best Voice Performance: Melina Juergens as Senua — Senua's Saga: Hellblade II
- Best Ensemble Cast Performance: Marvel's Spider-Man 2

==== Recognition ====
- Lifetime Achievement Award: Scott Gershin
- Bob Rice Recognition Award: Jenna "Jennissary"
- Best Game Audio Article or Publication: "Mixing AAA Videogames" (John Broomhall, Jodie Kupsco, Sonia Coronado, Alex Previty; AudioTechnology)
- Best Game Audio Presentation, Podcast, or Broadcast: "Scoring Terror – The Music of The Outlast Trials " (Tom Salta; GameSoundCon 2023)

=== 24th (2026) ===
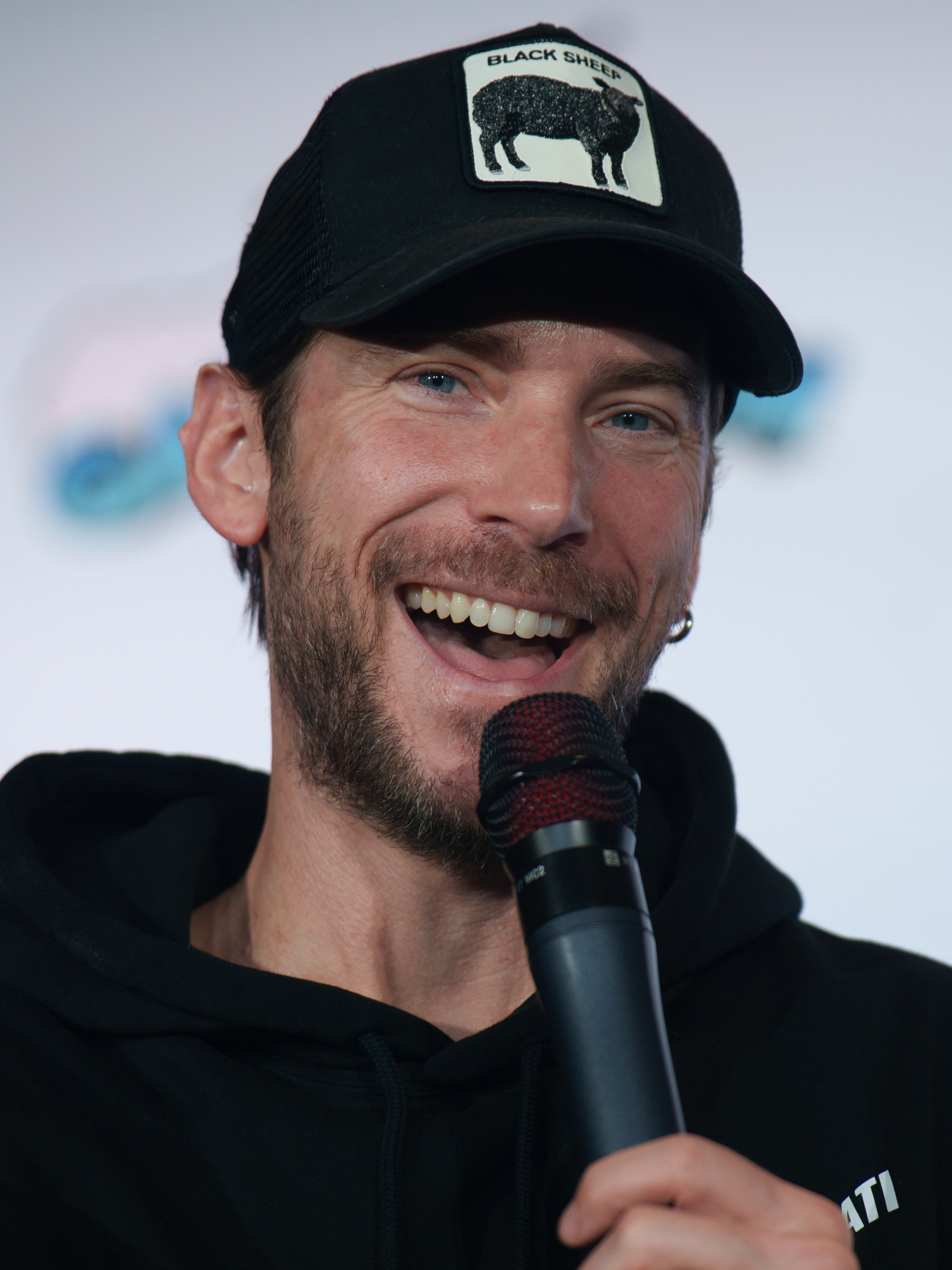
Troy Baker won Best Voice Performance for his role as Indiana Jones in Indiana Jones and the Great Circle (tied with Judy Alice Lee).

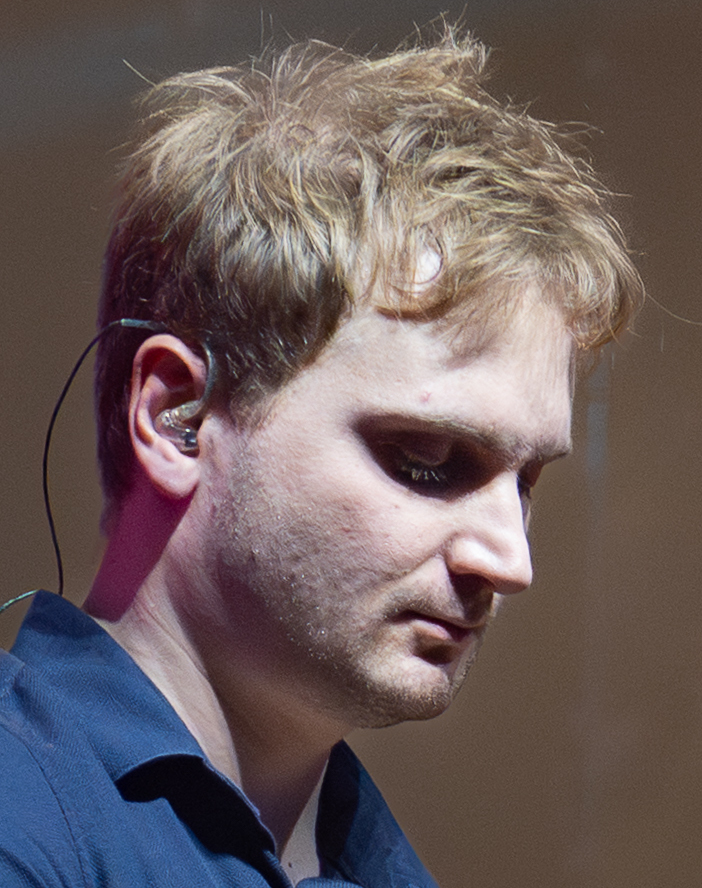
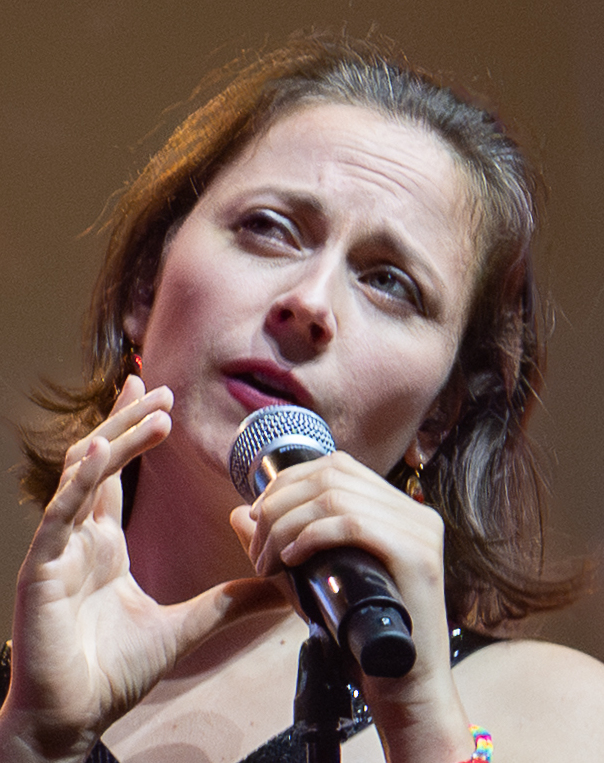
Lorien Testard (top) won several awards for his work on the music of Clair Obscur: Expedition 33, including Best Original Song for "Lumière", performed by Alice Duport-Percier (bottom).

The 24th Annual G.A.N.G. Awards took place on March 11, 2026, at the Moscone Center. Nominees were announced on December 17, 2025, and voting closed on January 13, 2026. Becky Allen, William "Chip" Beaman, and Karina Pardus received the Lifetime Achievement Award, Bob Rice G.A.N.G. Recognition Award, and Distinguished Service Award, respectively. Death Stranding 2: On the Beach led the winners with eight awards, including Audio of the Year, followed by Clair Obscur: Expedition 33 with seven. The show had three ties, including for Best Voice Performance.

==== Overall ====
- Audio of the Year: Death Stranding 2: On the Beach
- Best Accessible Audio Design: Diablo IV: Vessel of Hatred
- Best Audio for a Casual or Social Game: Destiny: Rising
- Best Audio for an Indie Game: Hades II
- Best Audio Mix: Death Stranding 2: On the Beach
- Best New Original IP Audio: Clair Obscur: Expedition 33
- Best Cinematic and Cutscene Audio: Delta Force and Diablo IV: Vessel of Hatred (tie)
- Best Game Trailer Audio: Death Stranding 2: On the Beach "Pre-Order Trailer"

==== Music ====
- Music of the Year: Clair Obscur: Expedition 33
- Creative and Technical Achievement in Music: Death Stranding 2: On the Beach
- Best Music for an Indie Game: Hades II
- Best Original Soundtrack Album: Clair Obscur: Expedition 33
- Best Main Theme: Clair Obscur: Expedition 33 and Death Stranding 2: On the Beach (tie)
- Best Original Song: "Lumière" (Clair Obscur: Expedition 33)
- Best Game Music Cover: "'Lumière' for Brass Quintet and Voice" (The Game Brass featuring Laura Intravia)

==== Sound Design ====
- Sound Design of the Year: Death Stranding 2: On the Beach
- Creative and Technical Achievement in Sound Design: Death Stranding 2: On the Beach
- Best Game Foley: Death Stranding 2: On the Beach
- Best Sound Design for an Indie Game: Hades II
- Best UI, Reward, or Objective Sound Design: Marvel Rivals

==== Voice Acting ====
- Dialogue of the Year: Indiana Jones and the Great Circle
- Best Dialogue for an Indie Game: Hades II
- Best Ensemble Cast Performance: Clair Obscur: Expedition 33
- Best Voice Performance: Troy Baker as Indiana Jones (Indiana Jones and the Great Circle) and Judy Alice Lee as Neyrelle (Diablo IV: Vessel of Hatred) (tie)

==== Recognition ====
- Lifetime Achievement Award: Becky Allen
- Best Game Audio Article or Publication: "GameSoundCon Game Audio Industry Survey Results 2025" (Brian Schmidt; GameSoundCon Blog)
- Best Game Audio Presentation, Podcast, or Broadcast: "How the Music of Expedition 33 Became this Composer's First Game Project (Austin Wintory; The Game Maker's Notebook)
