= 2021 in video games =

In the video game industry, 2021 saw the release of many new titles. The numerous delays in software and hardware releases due to the continuation of the COVID-19 pandemic heavily impacted development schedules, leading to several games being delayed into 2022 or even postponed indefinitely. Additionally, computer and console hardware were impacted by the combined effects of a semiconductor shortage (partially from post-COVID-19 effects) and a rising growth of bitcoin mining that strained the supply of critical components.

== Financial performance ==
According to market research firm Newzoo, the global video game market reached total revenues of US$180.3 billion, a 1.4% growth from 2020. Of this, 52% of the revenue was attributed to the mobile game market and the larger growth over the prior year, 28% to the console games market (including hardware and software), and 20% to the personal computer market.

=== Largest markets ===
According to market research firm Newzoo, the following countries were the largest video game markets in 2021.

Rank	Country	Revenue	Players
1	China	$46,010,000,000	685,480,000
2	United States	$40,540,000,000	191,120,000
3	Japan	$22,090,000,000	75,620,000
4	South Korea	$7,550,000,000	33,010,000
5	Germany	$5,870,000,000	46,120,000
6	United Kingdom	$5,310,000,000	37,660,000
7	France	$4,130,000,000	38,080,000
8	Canada	$3,690,000,000	20,980,000
9	Italy	$3,290,000,000	36,550,000
10	Spain	$2,330,000,000	29,730,000

=== Highest-grossing mobile games ===
The following titles are the top ten highest-grossing mobile games of 2021.

Rank	Game	Revenue	Publisher(s)	Genre(s)
1	PUBG Mobile / Game for Peace	$2,900,000,000	Tencent / Krafton	Battle royale
2	Honor of Kings / Arena of Valor	$2,800,000,000	Tencent	MOBA
3	Genshin Impact	$1,900,000,000	miHoYo	Action RPG
4	Roblox Mobile	$1,400,000,000	Roblox Corporation	GCS, MMO
5	Coin Master	$1,400,000,000	Moon Active	Casual, Casino
6	Pokémon Go	$1,300,000,000	Niantic	AR
7	Candy Crush Saga	$1,300,000,000	King (Activision Blizzard)	Puzzle
8	Garena Free Fire	$1,200,000,000	Garena	Battle royale
9	Uma Musume Pretty Derby	$990,000,000	Cygames	Simulation, Sports
10	Three Kingdoms Tactics	$931,000,000	Alibaba Group / Koei Tecmo	4X

=== Highest-grossing games in China ===
The following titles were 2021's top six highest-grossing video games in China.

Rank	Game	Revenue	Genre	Platform(s)	Publisher
1	Honor of Kings	$2,600,000,000	MOBA	Mobile	Tencent
2	PUBG Mobile / Peacekeeper Elite	$1,700,000,000	Battle royale	Mobile	Tencent
3	League of Legends	$1,100,000,000	MOBA	PC	Tencent
4	Dungeon Fighter Online	$876,000,000	Beat 'em up	PC	Tencent
5	Crossfire	$795,000,000	FPS	PC	Tencent
6	Fantasy Westward Journey	$713,000,000	MMORPG	Mobile	NetEase

=== Best-selling premium games by region ===
The following titles were 2021's top ten best-selling premium games by region (excluding microtransactions and free-to-play titles) on PC and console platforms, for Japan, the United States, and Europe.

Rank	Japan	United States	Europe
1	Monster Hunter Rise	Call of Duty: Vanguard	FIFA 22
2	Pokémon Brilliant Diamond / Shining Pearl	Call of Duty: Black Ops Cold War	Grand Theft Auto V
3	Momotaro Dentetsu: Showa, Heisei, Reiwa Mo Teiban!	Madden NFL 22	FIFA 21
4	Super Mario 3D World + Bowser's Fury	Pokémon Brilliant Diamond / Shining Pearl (Note: Not including digital sales)	Call of Duty: Vanguard
5	Ring Fit Adventure	Battlefield 2042	Mario Kart 8 Deluxe
6	Mario Kart 8 Deluxe	Spider-Man: Miles Morales	Red Dead Redemption 2
7	Minecraft: Nintendo Switch Edition	Mario Kart 8 Deluxe	Super Mario 3D World + Bowser's Fury
8	Animal Crossing: New Horizons	Resident Evil Village	Call of Duty: Black Ops Cold War
9	Mario Party Superstars	MLB The Show 21	Assassin's Creed Valhalla
10	Super Smash Bros. Ultimate	Super Mario 3D World + Bowser's Fury	Spider-Man: Miles Morales

== Top-rated games ==
=== Critically acclaimed games ===
Metacritic is an aggregator of video game journalism reviews. It generally considers expansions and re-releases as separate entities.

Releases scoring 90/100 or higher on Metacritic in 2021
Title	Developer(s)	Publisher(s)	Release	Platform(s)	Average score
Disco Elysium: The Final Cut	ZA/UM		October 15, 2021	WIN	97
The House in Fata Morgana - Dreams of the Revenants Edition	Novectacle	Limited Run Games	April 9, 2021	NS	96
Tetris Effect: Connected	Monstars, Resonair, Stage Games	Enhance Games	October 8, 2021	WIN	94
Hades	Supergiant Games		August 13, 2021	PS5, XSX/S	93
Forza Horizon 5	Playground Games	Xbox Game Studios	November 5, 2021	XSX/S	92
Final Fantasy XIV: Endwalker	Square Enix Creative Business Unit III	Square Enix	December 7, 2021	WIN	92
Forza Horizon 5	Playground Games	Xbox Game Studios	November 9, 2021	WIN	91
Psychonauts 2	Double Fine	Xbox Game Studios	August 25, 2021	XBO	91
Microsoft Flight Simulator	Asobo Studio	Xbox Game Studios	July 27, 2021	XSX/S	90
Tony Hawk's Pro Skater 1 + 2	Vicarious Visions	Activision	September 4, 2021	PS5	90
Chicory: A Colorful Tale	Greg Lobarov	Finji	June 10, 2021	WIN	90
Mass Effect Legendary Edition	BioWare	Electronic Arts	May 14, 2021	XBO	90
Chicory: A Colorful Tale	Greg Lobarov	Finji	December 15, 2021	NS	90
Final Fantasy XIV: Endwalker	Square Enix		December 7, 2021	PS5	90

=== Major awards ===
Category/Organization		39th Golden Joystick Awards November 23, 2021	The Game Awards 2021 December 9, 2021	25th Annual D.I.C.E. Awards February 24, 2022		22nd Game Developers Choice Awards March 23, 2022		18th British Academy Games Awards April 7, 2022
Game of the Year		Resident Evil Village	It Takes Two			Inscryption		Returnal
Independent / Debut (Note: Some award presentations combine these categories.)	Indie	Death's Door	Kena: Bridge of Spirits	Unpacking		Valheim		Toem
Independent / Debut	Debut	Death's Door	Kena: Bridge of Spirits	Unpacking		Valheim		Toem
Mobile		League of Legends: Wild Rift	Genshin Impact	Pokémon Unite		—N/a		
VR/AR		—N/a	Resident Evil 4 VR	Lone Echo II		—N/a		
Artistic Achievement	Animation	Ratchet & Clank: Rift Apart	Deathloop	Ratchet & Clank: Rift Apart		Ratchet & Clank: Rift Apart		Ratchet & Clank: Rift Apart
Artistic Achievement	Art Direction	Ratchet & Clank: Rift Apart	Deathloop	Ratchet & Clank: Rift Apart		Ratchet & Clank: Rift Apart		The Artful Escape
Audio	Music	Resident Evil Village	Nier Replicant ver.1.22474487139...	Returnal		Unpacking		Returnal
Audio	Sound Design	Resident Evil Village	Forza Horizon 5	Returnal		Unpacking		Returnal
Character or Performance	Leading Role	Maggie Robertson as Lady Dimitrescu; Resident Evil Village		Lady Dimitrescu; Resident Evil Village		—N/a		Jane Perry as Selene; Returnal
Character or Performance	Supporting Role	Maggie Robertson as Lady Dimitrescu; Resident Evil Village		Lady Dimitrescu; Resident Evil Village		—N/a		Kimberly Brooks as Hollis Forsythe; Psychonauts 2
Game Direction or Design	Game Design	—N/a	Deathloop	It Takes Two		It Takes Two		Inscryption
Game Direction or Design	Game Direction	—N/a	Deathloop	Deathloop		It Takes Two		Inscryption
Narrative		Life Is Strange: True Colors	Marvel's Guardians of the Galaxy			Psychonauts 2		Unpacking
Technical Achievement		—N/a		Ratchet & Clank: Rift Apart				
Multiplayer/Online		It Takes Two		Halo Infinite		—N/a		It Takes Two
Action		—N/a	Returnal	Halo Infinite		—N/a		
Adventure		—N/a	Metroid Dread	Marvel's Guardians of the Galaxy		—N/a		
Family		—N/a	It Takes Two	Ratchet & Clank: Rift Apart		—N/a		Chicory: A Colorful Tale
Fighting		—N/a	Guilty Gear Strive			—N/a		
Role-Playing		—N/a	Tales of Arise	Final Fantasy XIV: Endwalker		—N/a		
Sports/Racing	Sports	—N/a	Forza Horizon 5	Mario Golf: Super Rush		—N/a		
Sports/Racing	Racing	—N/a	Forza Horizon 5	Forza Horizon 5		—N/a		
Strategy/Simulation		—N/a	Age of Empires IV			—N/a		
Social Impact		—N/a	Life Is Strange: True Colors	—N/a		Boyfriend Dungeon		Before Your Eyes
Special Award		Ultimate Game of All Time	—N/a	Hall of Fame	Lifetime Achievement	Ambassador Award	Lifetime Achievement	BAFTA Fellowship
Special Award		Dark Souls	—N/a	Ed Boon	Phil Spencer	Steven Spohn	Yuji Horii	—N/a

== Major events ==
Date	Event	Ref.
January 4	Nintendo purchased Canadian video game developer Next Level Games, with the finalizations of the deal being done by March 1.	
January 13	Lucasfilm revived the Lucasfilm Games brand and announced a new Star Wars game from Ubisoft and Massive Entertainment, terminating the exclusive license held by Electronic Arts for the property.	
January 15	YoYo Games, the developers of the GameMaker software, were acquired by Opera to help establish an Opera Gaming division.	
January 22	Vicarious Visions was merged into Blizzard Entertainment with its staff of over 200 becoming employees of Blizzard.	
January 25	The Carlyle Group completed its acquisition of Jagex.	
February 1	Google shuttered its internal Stadia Games and Entertainment division, with plans to refocus the service as a publisher for third-party games.	
February 2	Embracer Group acquired Gearbox Software, Aspyr Media, and Easybrain.	
February 9	The Pokémon Company announced that the World Championships has been canceled due to concerns of COVID-19.	
February 18	Electronic Arts completed its estimated $1.2 billion acquisition of Codemasters.	
February 19–20	Blizzard Entertainment held its virtual BlizzCon event.	
March 2	Epic Games acquired Tonic Games Group, including developer Mediatonic.	
March 9	Microsoft's Xbox Game Studios completed its acquisition of ZeniMax Media and its subsidiary studios.	
March 9	tinyBuild offered its initial public offering on the Alternative Investment Market of the London Stock Exchange.	
March 10	The Roblox Corporation held its direct public offering on the New York Stock Exchange.	
March 16	Take-Two Interactive acquired HB Studios, which became a part of 2K.	
March 18	Sony Interactive Entertainment and Endeavor jointly acquired the Evolution Championship Series.	
March 18	Super Nintendo World opens to the public in Universal Studios Japan in Osaka.	
April 2	Focus Home Interactive acquired Streum On Studio.	
April 22	Academy of Interactive Arts & Sciences hosted the 24th Annual D.I.C.E. Awards, held as an online livestreamed event due to the COVID-19 pandemic.	
April 25	Colette, a short documentary film co-produced by Oculus and Respawn Entertainment for Medal of Honor: Above and Beyond, won the Academy Award for Best Documentary (Short Subject), making it the first Oscar awarded to a video game-related project.	
April 29	Electronic Arts completed its estimated $2.1 billion acquisition of mobile game developer Glu Mobile.	
May 3–24	The trial for the Epic Games v. Apple lawsuit was held.	
June 12–15	E3 2021 was held as an online event.	
June 21	The Sonic the Hedgehog franchise celebrated its 30th anniversary.	
June 29	Sony Interactive Entertainment acquired Housemarque, which became a part of PlayStation Studios.	
July 1	Sony Interactive Entertainment acquired Nixxes Software, which became a part of PlayStation Studios.	
July 15–18	PAX Online was held after cancelling the planned in-person PAX East event from June.	
July 19	Tencent announced its acquisition of Sumo Group for $1.3 billion.	
July 19–23	The Game Developers Conference and Independent Games Festival was held as an online event.	
July 20	The California Department of Fair Employment and Housing (DFEH) initiated a lawsuit against Activision Blizzard following a two-year investigation asserting the company maintained a hostile workplace that discriminated and harassed female employees, leading to thousands of employees signing onto an open letter and performing a walkout, demanding management take appropriate reaction.	
August 3	Blizzard Entertainment President J. Allen Brack left the company in the wake of the DFEH lawsuit.	
August 5	Embracer Group acquired eight additional studios, including 3D Realms, Ghost Ship Games and Slipgate Ironworks.	
August 5	Focus Home Interactive acquired Dotemu.	
August 6–8, 13–15	Evolution Championship Series 2021 was held as an online event.	
August 10	Krafton completed its initial public offering on the Korea Exchange, with an initial valuation of around $19 billion.	
August 19–21	Quakecon 2021 was held as an online event.	
August 25–27	Gamescom 2021 was held as an online event.	
August 30	China announces a law that restricts people under the age of 18 to play video games only up to 3 hours a week.	
September 8	Sony Interactive Entertainment acquired Firesprite, which became a part of PlayStation Studios.	
September 9	The Crash Bandicoot franchise celebrated its 25th anniversary.	
September 10	In Epic Games v. Apple, Apple was given a permanent injunction preventing them from blocking apps that included links to third-party payment systems.	
September 28	Netflix acquired Night School Studio as its first game studio.	
September 30	Sony Interactive Entertainment acquired Bluepoint Games, which became a part of PlayStation Studios.	
September 30–October 3	Tokyo Game Show 2021 was held as an online event.	
October 7–17	The International 2021, the tenth iteration of the annual Dota 2 global esports tournament, was held in Bucharest, Romania. It holds the record for the largest esports prize pool of all time at $40 million.	
October 21	NetEase acquired Grasshopper Manufacture from GungHo Online Entertainment.	
October 25-26	The Nintendo Switch Online service launches the Expansion Pack subscription, which allows subscribers of it to play emulated Nintendo 64 & Sega Genesis/Mega Drive titles and features exclusive DLC for Nintendo Switch games.	
October 28	Mark Zuckerberg rebrands Facebook as Meta Platforms. Zuckerberg announced that "The Metaverse" will be a hybrid of social media, fitness, gaming, and more.	
October 29	Krafton acquired Unknown Worlds Entertainment.	
November 2	Netflix launched its video game service via its mobile app for subscribers.	
November 4	Devolver Digital went public on the Alternative Investment Market and acquired Dodge Roll, Nerial and Firefly Studios.	
November 15	Take-Two Interactive acquired Roll7, which became a part of Private Division.	
November 16	G4, the gaming-focused TV network that shut down in 2014, was relaunched on various linear TV and streaming services.	
November 23	Epic Games acquired Harmonix.	
December 9	The Game Awards 2021 was held at the Microsoft Theater in Los Angeles.	
December 10	Sony Interactive Entertainment acquired Valkyrie Entertainment, which became a part of PlayStation Studios.	
December 15	Embracer Group acquired board game publisher Asmodee.	
December 17	Tencent acquired Turtle Rock Studios.	
December 21	Embracer Group acquired Perfect World Entertainment along with its publishing group and Cryptic Studios, as well as Dark Horse Media, the parent company of Dark Horse Comics and Dark Horse Entertainment.	
December 27	Riot Games agreed to settle its workplace gender discrimination lawsuit with two former employees for $100 million.	

== Notable deaths ==
- January 29 – Walker Boone, 76, actor who played Mario in The Adventures of Super Mario Bros. 3 and Super Mario World.
- February 3 – Robert A. Altman, 73, co-founder and CEO of ZeniMax Media.
- March 11 – Gordon Hall, 51, co-founder of Rockstar Leeds.
- April 4 – Ralph Schuckett, 73, co-composer on the video game Pokémon Puzzle League.
- April 9 – DMX, 50, rapper who appeared in Street Hoops and Def Jam Vendetta.
- May 28 – Benoît Sokal, 66, creator of the Syberia series.
- June 4 – Ebbe Altberg, ca. 57, CEO of Linden Lab, creators of Second Life.
- ca. June 27 – "Near" aka "Byuu", ca. 38, developer of the higan emulator for the Super Nintendo Entertainment System.
- ca. August – David Lawson, 62, co-founder of Imagine Software and Psygnosis
- August 29 – Ed Asner, 91, actor known for voicing Carl Fredrickson in Up.
- September 12 – Brandon Ashur, 36, Minecraft YouTuber and livestreamer also known as Bashurverse.
- September 16 – Clive Sinclair, 81, founder of Sinclair Research, the company behind several early personal computers like the ZX Spectrum
- September 18 – Mick McGinty, 69, traditional artist for television, film, and video games, including artwork for Street Fighter II and other games in the 1980s and 1990s.
- September 30 – Koichi Sugiyama, 90, composer of the Dragon Quest series among others.
- October 16 – Hiroshi Ono, 64, graphic artist for Namco who did most of their pixel art for their early arcade games, and was otherwise known as "Mr Dotman".
- December 6 – Masayuki Uemura, 78, lead architect of the Nintendo Entertainment System and Super Nintendo Entertainment System.
- December 14 – Ian Hetherington, 69, co-founder of Imagine Software and Psygnosis, chairman of Evolution Studios and Realtime Worlds.
- December 28 – John Madden, 85, American football coach and commentator, and namesake of Electronic Arts' Madden NFL series.

== Hardware releases ==
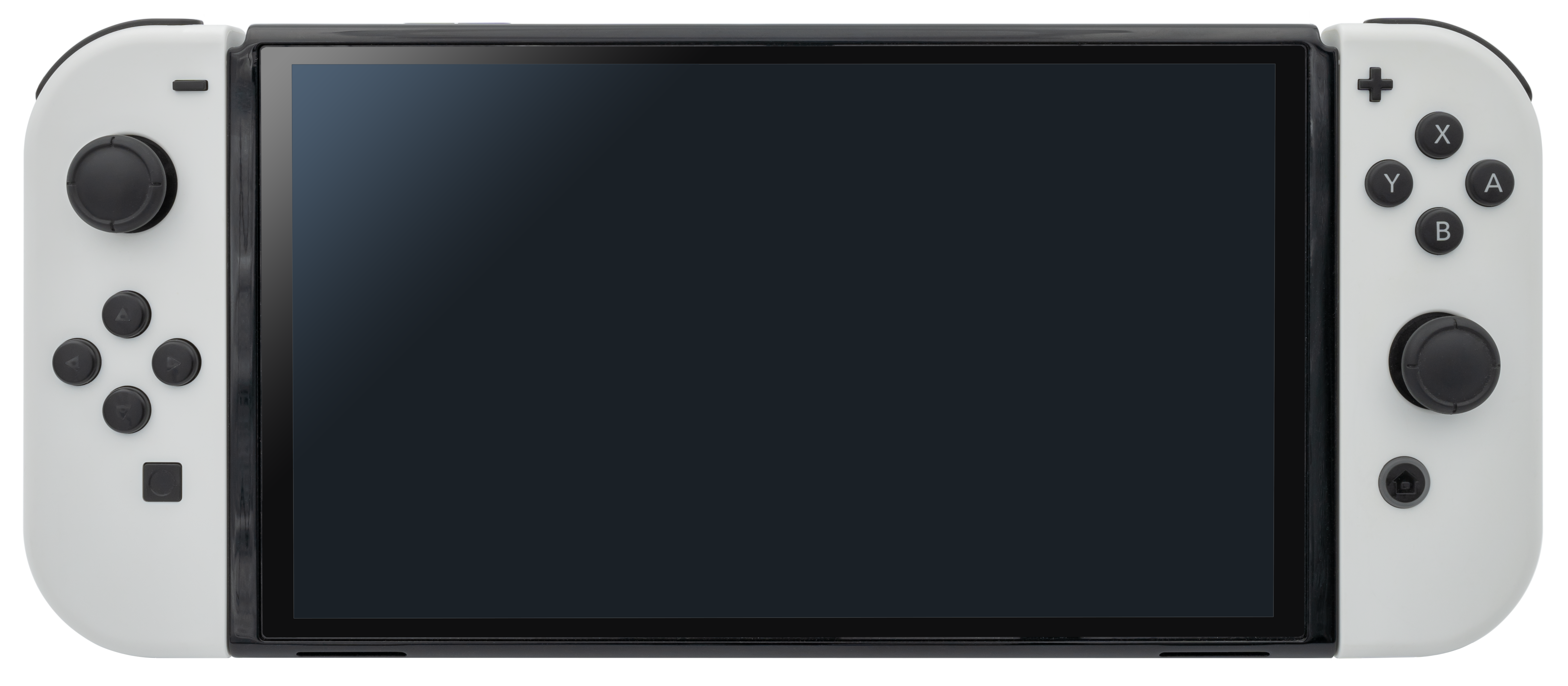
Nintendo Switch OLED Model

The list of game-related hardware released in 2021.

Date	Console	Manufacturer	Ref.
June 15	Atari VCS (Note: Wide release, Kickstarter backers received the console in December 2020.)	Atari	
October 8	Nintendo Switch (OLED model)	Nintendo	
November 3	Evercade VS	Blaze Entertainment	
November 12	Game & Watch: The Legend of Zelda	Nintendo	
December 13	Analogue Pocket	Analogue	

== Discontinued games ==
- Skylar & Plux: Adventure on Clover Island (WIN, PS4, XBO)

== Video game-based film and television releases ==
Title	Date	Type	Distributor(s)	Franchise	Original game publisher(s)	Ref.
Dota: Dragon's Blood	March 25, 2021	Animated television series	Netflix	Dota	Valve	
Blue Reflection Ray	April 9, 2021	Anime television series	Funimation	Blue Reflection	Koei Tecmo	
The World Ends with You: The Animation	April 9, 2021	Anime television series	Funimation	The World Ends with You	Square Enix	
Mortal Kombat	April 23, 2021	Feature film	Warner Bros. Pictures	Mortal Kombat	Midway Games	
Dynasty Warriors	April 29, 2021	Feature film	Newport Entertainment	Dynasty Warriors	Koei Tecmo	
Werewolves Within	June 16, 2021	Feature film	IFC Films	Werewolves Within	Ubisoft	
Scarlet Nexus	July 1, 2021	Anime television series	Funimation	Scarlet Nexus	Bandai Namco Entertainment	
Resident Evil: Infinite Darkness	July 8, 2021	Limited anime series	Netflix	Resident Evil	Capcom	
Monster Hunter: Legends of the Guild	August 12, 2021	Animated film	Netflix	Monster Hunter	Capcom	
Free Guy	August 13, 2021	Feature film	20th Century Studios	—N/a	—N/a	
Mortal Kombat Legends: Battle of the Realms	August 31, 2021	Animated film	Warner Bros. Home Entertainment	Mortal Kombat	Midway Games	
Pokémon Evolutions	September 9, 2021	Limited anime webseries	YouTube; Pokémon TV	Pokémon	Nintendo; The Pokémon Company	
Kimi to Fit Boxing	October 1, 2021	Anime television series	Tokyo MX (Japan)	Fitness Boxing	Imagineer	
Injustice	October 19, 2021	Animated film	Warner Bros. Home Entertainment	Injustice	NetherRealm Studios	
Deemo: Memorial Keys	October 22, 2021	Anime film	Pony Canyon	Deemo	Rayark Inc.	
Arcane	November 6, 2021	Animated television series	Netflix	League of Legends	Riot Games	
Resident Evil: Welcome to Raccoon City	November 24, 2021	Feature film	Sony Pictures Releasing	Resident Evil	Capcom	
Pokémon Ultimate Journeys: The Series	December 17, 2021 (Note: The series debuted on Netflix in October 2022, with a subsequent new batch of episodes in February, June and September, of 2023 respectively.)	Anime television series	TV Tokyo (Japan); Netflix (United States)	Pokémon	Nintendo; The Pokémon Company	

== See also ==
- 2021 in esports
- 2021 in games
- GameStop short squeeze
- 2020 Summer Olympics Parade of Nations
