= State of Play (video program) =

Series of video programs to showcase games

- Logo since 2021
- Genre: Video program
- Frequency: Irregular
- Years active: 2019–present
- Inaugurated: March 25, 2019
- Most recent: September 3, 2026
- Organizer: Sony Interactive Entertainment
- Website: www.playstation.com/en-us/state-of-play

State of Play is a series of video programs produced by Sony Interactive Entertainment (SIE) to showcase upcoming games for the PlayStation 4, PlayStation 5, PlayStation VR, and PlayStation VR2 platforms. State of Play broadcasts are used by Sony to directly communicate with consumers about new software, hardware, and updates within the PlayStation ecosystem.

== History ==
The State of Play format was introduced by Sony in March 2019 as a new way of engaging with the PlayStation community by delivering direct-to-consumer broadcasts, similar to Nintendo showcasing and revealing their games in Nintendo Direct presentations. The initiative represented a shift in how Sony markets its upcoming titles, moving away from large industry events like E3 in favor of a more controlled, proprietary, digital presentation format.

== Format ==
State of Play broadcasts vary in length and content, generally featuring a mix of announcements. These include new game reveals, gameplay footage, updates on previously announced titles, and occasionally hardware announcements. They are available to watch on video sharing and live-streaming platforms such as YouTube and Twitch. Sony also occasionally holds the PlayStation Showcase format, in which they announce new first-party titles produced by their internal PlayStation Studios. However, in recent years they started to announce such new titles in regular State of Plays as well.

== List of events ==
Alongside State of Play video programs, other digital PlayStation events without the "State of Play" branding are listed. The featured titles are listed in the order they appeared during the respective event.

State of Play
Other PlayStation events

List of State of Play events
Name	Date	Duration	Titles featured	Ref.
State of Play	March 25, 2019	19:49	Iron Man VR, Crash Team Racing Nitro-Fueled, No Man's Sky, ReadySet Heroes, Blood & Truth, Observation, Five Nights at Freddy's: Help Wanted, Concrete Genie, Days Gone, Mortal Kombat 11	
State of Play	May 9, 2019	13:00	Monster Hunter World: Iceborne, Riverbond, Predator: Hunting Grounds, MediEvil, Away: The Survival Series, Final Fantasy VII Remake	
State of Play	September 24, 2019	21:41	Humanity, Call of Duty: Modern Warfare, Wattam, Arise: A Simple Story, L.A. Noire: The VR Case Files, MediEvil, Civilization VI, Afterparty, The Last of Us Part II	
State of Play	December 10, 2019	22:43	Untitled Goose Game, Spellbreak, Dreams, Superliminal, Paper Beast, Kingdom Hearts III Re Mind, Predator: Hunting Grounds, Babylon's Fall, Resident Evil 3, Ghost of Tsushima	
Ghost of Tsushima – State of Play	May 14, 2020	18:40	Ghost of Tsushima	
The Last of Us Part II – State of Play	May 27, 2020	23:33	The Last of Us Part II	
PS5 – The Future of Gaming Show	June 11, 2020	1:14:24	Grand Theft Auto V, Spider-Man: Miles Morales, Gran Turismo 7, Ratchet & Clank: Rift Apart, Project Athia, Stray, Returnal, Sackboy: A Big Adventure, Destruction AllStars, Kena: Bridge of Spirits, Goodbye Volcano High, Oddworld: Soulstorm, Ghostwire: Tokyo, Jett: The Far Shore, Godfall, Solar Ash, Hitman 3, Astro's Playroom, Little Devil Inside, NBA 2K21, Bugsnax, Demon's Souls, Deathloop, Resident Evil Village, Pragmata, Horizon Forbidden West	
State of Play	August 6, 2020	42:36	Crash Bandicoot 4: It's About Time, Hitman 3, Braid, The Pathless, Spelunky 2, Genshin Impact, Aeon Must Die, Anno: Mutationem, Bugsnax, Vader Immortal: A Star Wars VR Series, Control: AWE, Auto Chess, The Pedestrian, Hood: Outlaws & Legends, Temtem, Godfall	
PlayStation 5 Showcase	September 16, 2020	47:52	Final Fantasy XVI, Spider-Man: Miles Morales, Hogwarts Legacy, Call of Duty: Black Ops Cold War, Resident Evil Village, Deathloop, Devil May Cry 5: Special Edition, Oddworld: Soulstorm, Five Nights at Freddy's: Security Breach, Demon's Souls, Fortnite Battle Royale, God of War Ragnarök	
Demon's Souls – State of Play	November 7, 2020	12:12	Demon's Souls	
State of Play	February 25, 2021	31:52	Crash Bandicoot 4: It's About Time, Returnal, Knockout City, Sifu, Solar Ash, Five Nights at Freddy's: Security Breach, Oddworld: Soulstorm, Kena: Bridge of Spirits, Deathloop, Final Fantasy VII Remake Intergrade	
State of Play	April 29, 2021	22:27	Subnautica: Below Zero, Among Us, Ratchet & Clank: Rift Apart	
Horizon Forbidden West – State of Play	May 27, 2021	19:10	Horizon Forbidden West	
State of Play	July 8, 2021	31:43	Moss: Book II, Arcadegeddon, Tribes of Midgard, F.I.S.T.: Forged In Shadow Torch, Hunter's Arena: Legends, Sifu, Jett: The Far Shore, Demon Slayer: Kimetsu no Yaiba – The Hinokami Chronicles, Lost Judgment, Death Stranding Director's Cut, Deathloop	
PlayStation Showcase 2021	September 9, 2021	42:00	Star Wars: Knights of the Old Republic — Remake, Stellar Blade, Tiny Tina's Wonderlands, Forspoken, Tom Clancy's Rainbow Six Extraction, Alan Wake Remastered, Grand Theft Auto V, Ghostwire: Tokyo, Marvel's Guardians of the Galaxy, Vampire: The Masquerade – Bloodhunt, Deathloop, Tchia, Uncharted: Legacy of Thieves Collection, Marvel's Wolverine, Gran Turismo 7, Marvel's Spider-Man 2, God of War Ragnarök	
State of Play	October 27, 2021	22:32	Deathverse: Let It Die, We Are OFK, Bugsnax: The Isle of BIGsnax, Five Nights at Freddy's: Security Breach, Death's Door, KartRider: Drift, King of Fighters XV, First Class Trouble, Star Ocean: The Divine Force, Little Devil Inside	
Gran Turismo 7 – State of Play	February 2, 2022	31:59	Gran Turismo 7	
State of Play	March 9, 2022	21:42	Exoprimal, Ghostwire: Tokyo, Stranger of Paradise: Final Fantasy Origin, Forspoken, Gundam Evolution, Teenage Mutant Ninja Turtles: The Cowabunga Collection, GigaBash, JoJo's Bizarre Adventure: All Star Battle R, Trek to Yomi, Returnal: Ascension, The DioField Chronicle, Valkyrie Elysium	
Hogwarts Legacy – State of Play	March 17, 2022	22:28	Hogwarts Legacy	
State of Play	June 2, 2022	28:34	Resident Evil 4, Resident Evil Village VR Mode, The Walking Dead: Saints & Sinners – Chapter 2: Retribution, No Man's Sky, Horizon Call of the Mountain, Marvel's Spider-Man Remastered, Stray, The Callisto Protocol, Rollerdrome, Eternights, Street Fighter 6, Tunic, Season: A Letter to the Future, Final Fantasy XVI	
State of Play	September 13, 2022	22:12	Tekken 8, Star Wars: Tales from the Galaxy's Edge – Enhanced Edition, Demeo, Like a Dragon: Ishin, Hogwarts Legacy, Pacific Drive, Synduality, Stellar Blade, Rise of the Ronin, God of War Ragnarök	
State of Play	February 23, 2023	43:50	The Foglands, Green Hell VR, Synapse, Journey to Foundation, Before Your Eyes, Destiny 2: Lightfall, Tchia, Humanity, Goodbye Volcano High, Naruto X Boruto Ultimate Ninja Storm Connections, Baldur's Gate 3, Wayfinder, Street Fighter 6, Resident Evil 4, Suicide Squad: Kill the Justice League	
Final Fantasy XVI – State of Play	April 13, 2023	25:19	Final Fantasy XVI	
PlayStation Showcase 2023	May 24, 2023	1:12:29	FairGame$, Helldivers 2, Immortals of Aveum, Ghostrunner 2, Phantom Blade Zero, Sword of the Sea, The Talos Principle 2, Neva, Cat Quest: Pirates of the Purribean, Foamstars, The Plucky Squire, Teardown, Metal Gear Solid Delta: Snake Eater, Towers of Aghasba, Final Fantasy XVI, Alan Wake 2, Assassin's Creed Mirage, Revenant Hill, Granblue Fantasy: Relink, Street Fighter 6, Ultros, Tower of Fantasy, Dragon's Dogma 2, Five Nights at Freddy's: Help Wanted 2, Resident Evil 4 VR Mode, Arizona Sunshine 2, Crossfire: Sierra Squad, Synapse, Beat Saber, Marathon, Destiny 2: The Final Shape, Concord, Marvel's Spider-Man 2	
State of Play	September 14, 2023	27:17	Baby Steps, Roblox, Ghostbusters: Rise of the Ghost Lord, Resident Evil 4: Separate Ways, Avatar: Frontiers of Pandora, Ghostrunner 2, Helldivers 2, Marvel's Spider-Man 2, Tales of Arise: Beyond The Dawn, Honkai: Star Rail, Foamstars, Final Fantasy VII Rebirth	
State of Play	January 31, 2024	42:56	Helldivers 2, Stellar Blade, Sonic X Shadow Generations, Zenless Zone Zero, Foamstars, Dave the Diver, V Rising, Silent Hill: The Short Message, Silent Hill 2, Judas, Metro Awakening VR, Legendary Tales, Dragon's Dogma 2, Rise of the Ronin, Until Dawn, Death Stranding 2: On the Beach, Physint	
Final Fantasy VII Rebirth – State of Play	February 6, 2024	19:19	Final Fantasy VII Rebirth	
State of Play	May 30, 2024	35:31	Concord, God of War Ragnarök, Dynasty Warriors: Origins, Infinity Nikki, Ballad of Antara, Behemoth, Alien: Rogue Incursion, Marvel Rivals, Where Winds Meet, Until Dawn, Path of Exile 2, Silent Hill 2, Monster Hunter Wilds, Astro Bot	
State of Play	September 24, 2024	39:30	Astro Bot, The Midnight Walk, Hell Is Us, Metro Awakening VR, ArcheAge Chronicles, Palworld, Lunar Remastered Collection, Teenage Mutant Ninja Turtles: Shredder's Revenge, Sonic X Shadow Generations, Fantasian Neo Dimension, Dragon Age: The Veilguard, Alan Wake 2: The Lake House, Hitman World of Assassination VR Mode, Legacy of Kain: Soul Reaver 1 & 2 Remastered, Fear the Spotlight, Towers of Aghasba, Lego Fortnite, Dynasty Warriors: Origins, Monster Hunter Wilds, Lego Horizon Adventures, Horizon Zero Dawn Remastered, Stellar Blade, Ghost of Yōtei	
State of Play	February 12, 2025	46:40	Monster Hunter Wilds, Shinobi: Art of Vengeance, Sonic Racing: CrossWorlds, Digimon Time Stranger, Lost Soul Aside, Like a Dragon: Pirate Yakuza in Hawaii, Dave the Diver: Ichiban's Holiday, Splitgate 2, WWE 2K25, Borderlands 4, Split Fiction, Directive 8020, Five Nights at Freddy's: Secret of the Mimic, The Midnight Walk, Darwin's Paradox!, Warriors: Abyss, Onimusha 2: Samurai's Destiny, Onimusha: Way of the Sword, Metal Gear Solid Delta: Snake Eater, Hell Is Us, Lies of P: Overture, Dreams of Another, Days Gone Remastered, Stellar Blade, Lost Records: Bloom & Rage - Tape 1, Blue Prince, Abiotic Factor, Tides of Annihilation, Metal Eden, MindsEye, Saros	
Borderlands 4 – State of Play	April 30, 2025	20:36	Borderlands 4	
State of Play	June 4, 2025	55:01	Lumines Arise, Pragmata, Romeo is a Dead Man, Silent Hill f, Bloodstained: The Scarlet Engagement, Digimon Story: Time Stranger, Final Fantasy Tactics: The Ivalice Chronicles, Baby Steps, Hirogami, Everybody's Golf Hot Shots, Ninja Gaiden: Ragebound, Cairn, Mortal Kombat Legacy Kollection, Metal Gear Solid Delta: Snake Eater, Nioh 3, Thief VR: Legacy of Shadow, Tides of Tomorrow, Astro Bot, Sea of Remnants, Sword of the Sea, FBC: Firebreak, 007 First Light, Ghost of Yōtei, Marvel Tōkon: Fighting Souls	
Ghost of Yōtei – State of Play	July 10, 2025	19:12	Ghost of Yōtei	
007 First Light – State of Play	September 3, 2025	36:07	007 First Light	
State of Play	September 24, 2025	40:56	Saros, Zero Parades, Microsoft Flight Simulator 2024, Battlefield 6, Deus Ex Remastered, Halloween: The Game, The Seven Deadly Sins: Origin, Sonic Racing: CrossWorlds, Nioh 3, Dynasty Warriors 3: Complete Edition Remastered, Code Vein II, Final Fantasy Tactics: The Ivalice Chronicles, Let It Die Inferno, Chronoscript: The Endless End, Crimson Desert, Gran Turismo 7 Spec III, Marvel's Wolverine	
State of Play Japan	November 11, 2025	41:02	Dragon Quest VII Reimagined, InKonbini: One Store, Many Stories, Coffee Talk Tokyo, BrokenLore: Unfollow, BrokenLore: Ascend, Fatal Frame II: Crimson Butterfly Remake, Gran Turismo 7, No Sleep for Kaname Date – From AI: The Somnium Files, Tokyo Xtreme Racer, Once Upon a Katamari, Pac-Man World 2 Re-Pac, Digimon Story: Time Stranger, Super Robot Wars Y, Never Grave: The Witch and The Curse, BlazBlue Entropy Effect X, Octopath Traveler 0, Marvel Tōkon: Fighting Souls, Elden Ring Nightreign - The Forsaken Hollows	
State of Play	February 12, 2026	1:12:30	Kena: Scars of Kosmora, Ghost of Yōtei Legends, 4:LOOP, Pragmata, Resident Evil Requiem, Legacy of Kain: Defiance Remastered, Brigandine Abyss, Dead or Alive 6 Last Round, Dead or Alive New Project, Control Resonant, Crimson Moon, Beast of Reincarnation, Rayman: 30th Anniversary Edition, Mina the Hollower, Neva: Prologue, Yakoh Shinobi Ops, Project Windless, Star Wars: Galactic Racer, 007 First Light, Metal Gear Solid: Master Collection Vol. 2, Darwin's Paradox!, Castlevania: Belmont's Curse, Silent Hill: Townfall, Rev. NOiR, Untitled John Wick game, Marathon, Big Walk, Saros, Marvel Tōkon: Fighting Souls, God of War Trilogy Remake, God of War Sons of Sparta	
State of Play	June 2, 2026	1:17:57	Marvel's Wolverine, Marvel Tokon: Fighting Souls, Rayman Legends Retold, Bancho the Chef, Kemuri, Tomb Raider: Legacy of Atlantis, The Lost Wild, Phantom Blade Zero, Dune: Awakening, Dynasty Warriors 3: Complete Edition Remastered, No Rest for the Wicked, Onimusha: Way of the Sword, Silent Hill: Townfall, Ace Combat 8: Wings of Theve, Stuntman: Hollywood, Ill, Control Resonant, Marathon, Until Dawn 2, God of War Laufey	
Phantom Blade Zero – State of Play	August 17, 2026	20:51	Phantom Blade Zero	
State of Play	September 3, 2026	1:45:21	Resident Evil, Marvel's Wolverine, Ghost of Yōtei Complete Edition, Monster Hunter Wilds: Ascendance, Metro 2039, Maneater 2, Crimson Desert: Charting the Unknown, Final Fantasy Resonance, Gundam Rogue Orbit, Hunter's Moon, Uncanyon, Keeper, Rev. NOiR, Rhapsody in Scarlet, Saros: Zenith, Gran Turismo 7 Spec IV, Until Dawn 2, Final Fantasy VII Revelation	
State of Play Japan	September 3, 2026	1:45:21	Dragon Ball Xenoverse 3, Fate/Extra Record, Dragon Quest Monsters: The Withered World, The Eminence in Shadow: Phantom Echoes, Rematch x Blue Lock, Where the Seeds Fall, Gundam Rogue Orbit, WPCA: World Phasebound Control Authority, Stupid Never Dies, SlashZero, Echoes of Aincrad, Digimon Story Time Stranger: A Hero’s Eternal Legacy, CONQ: Crown of No Quarter, Rhapsody in Scarlet, Rev. NOiR, Daba: Land of Water Scar, Ghost of Yōtei Complete Edition	

== See also ==
- E3
- Nintendo Direct
- Xbox Developer Direct
