= 18th British Academy Games Awards =

Game award ceremony in 2022

- Date: 7 April 2022
- Location: https://www.bafta.org/games
- Hosted by: Elle Osili-Wood
- Best Game: Returnal
- Most awards: Returnal (4)
- Most nominations: It Takes Two and Returnal (9)

The 18th British Academy Video Game Awards was hosted by the British Academy of Film and Television Arts on 7 April 2022 to honour the best video games of 2021. Held at the Queen Elizabeth Hall in London, television presenter Elle Osili-Wood returned to host the ceremony for the second time. Co-operative action-adventure platformer It Takes Two and third-person roguelike shooter Returnal both led the nominations with nine. Returnal won four awards at the ceremony, the most wins of any game.

== Nominees and winners ==
Most nominations were announced on 3 March 2022, while the nominations for performers were announced on 16 March 2022.

Best Game: Returnal – Housemarque/Sony Interactive Entertainment; Deathloop – Arkane Studios/Bethesda Softworks; Forza Horizon 5 – Playground Games/Xbox Game Studios; Inscryption – Daniel Mullins Games/Devolver Digital; It Takes Two – Hazelight Studios/Electronic Arts; Ratchet & Clank: Rift Apart – Insomniac Games/Sony Interactive Entertainment	Animation: Ratchet & Clank: Rift Apart – Insomniac Games/Sony Interactive Entertainment; Call of Duty: Vanguard – Sledgehammer Games/Activision; It Takes Two – Hazelight Studios/Electronic Arts; Kena: Bridge of Spirits – Ember Lab; Life Is Strange: True Colors – Deck Nine/Square Enix; Psychonauts 2 – Double Fine/Xbox Game Studios
Artistic Achievement: The Artful Escape – Beethoven and Dinosaur/Annapurna Interactive; It Takes Two – Hazelight Studios/Electronic Arts; Psychonauts 2 – Double Fine/Xbox Game Studios; Ratchet & Clank: Rift Apart – Insomniac Games/Sony Interactive Entertainment; Resident Evil Village – Capcom; Returnal – Housemarque/Sony Interactive Entertainment	Audio Achievement: Returnal – Housemarque/Sony Interactive Entertainment; The Artful Escape – Beethoven and Dinosaur/Annapurna Interactive; Call of Duty: Vanguard – Sledgehammer Games/Activision; Deathloop – Arkane Studios/Bethesda Softworks; Halo Infinite – 343 Industries/Xbox Game Studios; Marvel's Guardians of the Galaxy – Eidos-Montréal/Square Enix
British Game: Forza Horizon 5 – Playground Games/Xbox Game Studios; Alba: A Wildlife Adventure – ustwo Games; Death's Door – Acid Nerve/Devolver Digital; Fights in Tight Spaces – Ground Shatter/Mode 7 Games; Overboard – Inkle Studios; Sable – Shedworks/Raw Fury	Debut Game: TOEM – Something We Made; The Artful Escape – Beethoven and Dinosaur/Annapurna Interactive; Eastward – Pixpil/Chucklefish; The Forgotten City – Modern Storyteller/Dear Villagers; Genesis Noir – Feral Cat Den/Fellow Traveller; Maquette – Graceful Decay/Annapurna Interactive
Evolving Game: No Man's Sky – Hello Games; Among Us – Innersloth; Animal Crossing: New Horizons – Nintendo; Apex Legends – Respawn Entertainment/Electronic Arts; Disco Elysium – ZA/UM; Fortnite – Epic Games	Family: Chicory: A Colorful Tale – Greg Lobanov/Finji; Alba: A Wildlife Adventure – ustwo Games; Forza Horizon 5 – Playground Games/Xbox Game Studios; Mario Party Superstars – Nintendo; Ratchet & Clank: Rift Apart – Insomniac Games/Sony Interactive Entertainment; Unpacking – Witch Beam/Humble Bundle
Game Beyond Entertainment: Before Your Eyes – Goodbye World/Skybound Games; Alba: A Wildlife Adventure – ustwo Games; Chicory: A Colorful Tale – Greg Lobanov/Finji; Game Builder Garage – Nintendo; It Takes Two – Hazelight Studios/Electronic Arts; Psychonauts 2 – Double Fine/Xbox Game Studios	Game Design: Inscryption – Daniel Mullins Games/Devolver Digital; Deathloop – Arkane Studios/Bethesda Softworks; Forza Horizon 5 – Playground Games/Xbox Game Studios; It Takes Two – Hazelight Studios/Electronic Arts; Ratchet & Clank: Rift Apart – Insomniac Games/Sony Interactive Entertainment; Returnal – Housemarque/Sony Interactive Entertainment
Multiplayer: It Takes Two – Hazelight Studios/Electronic Arts; Back 4 Blood – Turtle Rock Studios//Warner Bros. Interactive Entertainment; Call of Duty: Vanguard – Sledgehammer Games/Activision; Forza Horizon 5 – Playground Games/Xbox Game Studios; Halo Infinite – 343 Industries/Xbox Game Studios; Hell Let Loose – Black Matter/Team17	Music: Returnal – Housemarque/Sony Interactive Entertainment; Deathloop – Arkane Studios/Bethesda Softworks; Far Cry 6 – Ubisoft Toronto/Ubisoft; Halo Infinite – 343 Industries/Xbox Game Studios; Psychonauts 2 – Double Fine/Xbox Game Studios; Ratchet & Clank: Rift Apart – Insomniac Games/Sony Interactive Entertainment
Narrative: Unpacking – Witch Beam/Humble Bundle; It Takes Two – Hazelight Studios/Electronic Arts; Life Is Strange: True Colors – Deck Nine/Square Enix; Marvel's Guardians of the Galaxy – Eidos-Montréal/Square Enix; Psychonauts 2 – Double Fine/Xbox Game Studios; Returnal – Housemarque/Sony Interactive Entertainment	Original Property: It Takes Two – Hazelight Studios/Electronic Arts; Deathloop – Arkane Studios/Bethesda Softworks; Death's Door – Acid Nerve/Devolver Digital; Inscryption – Daniel Mullins Games/Devolver Digital; Returnal – Housemarque/Sony Interactive Entertainment; Unpacking – Witch Beam/Humble Bundle
Performer in a Leading Role: Jane Perry as Selene Vassos in Returnal; Ozioma Akagha as Julianna Blake in Deathloop; Jason E Kelley as Colt Vahn in Deathloop; Jennifer Hale as Rivet in Ratchet & Clank: Rift Apart; Jon McLaren as Star-Lord/Peter Quill in Marvel's Guardians of the Galaxy; Erika Mori as Alex Chen in Life Is Strange: True Colors	Performer in a Supporting Role: Kimberly Brooks as Hollis Forsythe in Psychonauts 2; Laura Bailey as Polina Petrova in Call of Duty: Vanguard; Jason Cavalier as Drax in Marvel's Guardians of the Galaxy; Maggie Robertson as Lady Dimitrescu in Resident Evil Village; Han Soto as Gabe Chen in Life Is Strange: True Colors; Alex Weiner as Rocket in Marvel's Guardians of the Galaxy
Technical Achievement: Ratchet & Clank: Rift Apart – Insomniac Games/Sony Interactive Entertainment; Forza Horizon 5 – Playground Games/Xbox Game Studios; Hitman 3 – IO Interactive; Psychonauts 2 – Double Fine/Xbox Game Studios; Resident Evil Village – Capcom; Returnal – Housemarque/Sony Interactive Entertainment	EE Game of the Year: Unpacking – Witch Beam/Humble Bundle; Chicory: A Colorful Tale – Greg Lobanov/Finji; Deathloop – Arkane Studios/Bethesda Softworks; The Forgotten City – Modern Storyteller/Dear Villagers; It Takes Two – Hazelight Studios/Electronic Arts; Metroid Dread – Mercury Steam/Nintendo

=== Games with multiple nominations and wins ===
==== Nominations ====
Nominations	Game
9	It Takes Two
9	Returnal
8	Deathloop
8	Ratchet & Clank: Rift Apart
7	Psychonauts 2
6	Forza Horizon 5
5	Marvel's Guardians of the Galaxy
4	Call of Duty: Vanguard
4	Life Is Strange: True Colors
4	Unpacking
3	Alba: A Wildlife Adventure
3	The Artful Escape
3	Chicory: A Colorful Tale
3	Halo Infinite
3	Inscryption
3	Resident Evil Village
2	Death's Door
2	The Forgotten City

==== Wins ====
Wins	Game
4	Returnal
2	It Takes Two
2	Ratchet and Clank: Rift Apart
2	Unpacking
