= Jane Perry =

Jane Perry may refer to:

- Jane Perry (Shortland Street), a character on Shortland Street
- Jane Perry (actress), Canadian actress and voice actor
