= Ill (video game) =

Upcoming video game

ILL
- Developer: Team Clout
- Publisher: Mundfish Powerhouse
- Engine: Unreal Engine 5
- Platforms: PlayStation 5; Windows; Xbox Series X/S
- Release: WW: 2027
- Genre: Survival horror
- Mode: Single-player

Ill is an upcoming survival horror video game developed by Team Clout and published by Mundfish Powerhouse. It is scheduled for release in 2027 for PlayStation 5, Windows, and Xbox Series X and Series S. The game was revealed at Summer Game Fest in 2025.

== Gameplay ==
Ill is a first-person action survival horror game. Its gameplay includes exploration, resource management, crafting, inventory management, environmental puzzles, and combat against enemies and bosses. Game director Max Verehin said the developers wanted to combine survival horror with first-person action, shooting mechanics, and dismemberment.

The game features physics-based environments that interact with combat, puzzle solving, and exploration. Weapons require maintenance and can be modified and upgraded, while combat emphasizes limited resources and tactical decision making. The game also includes a dismemberment system and enemy behaviour affected by player actions.

== Premise ==
Ill takes place inside a large research fort that has been overtaken by a hostile force and the Aberrations it creates. The protagonist must survive the creatures inside the complex and uncover the cause of the catastrophe.

== Development ==
Ill is developed by Armenian company Team Clout, a team of around 50 people. The game started development when the four founders experimented with the idea of creating a physics-based horror video game. In 2023, the studio signed an agreement with Mundfish Powerhouse, a division of Mundfish, which will serve as its publisher. The game is being developed using Unreal Engine 5.

Team Clout founders Maxim Verehin and Oleg Vdovenko have backgrounds in concept art, horror animation, and film production. The developers cited practical effects, animatronics, horror films from the 1970s to the 1990s, Half-Life 2, Silent Hill, and the Resident Evil series as influences on the game's design. According to Verehin, the team designed the game's first-person presentation so that cinematic moments could transition into active play without frequent cuts.

== Marketing and release ==
The concept trailer of the game was first released in 2021. Ill was officially revealed at Summer Game Fest in June 2025, when it was announced for PlayStation 5, Windows, and Xbox Series X/S. A story trailer shown during State of Play in June 2026 confirmed a 2027 release window and showed new characters, locations, weapons, and Aberration types.
