= Hell Is Us =

- Developer: Rogue Factor
- Publisher: Nacon
- Director: Jonathan Jacques-Belletete
- Producer: Cédric Olivier
- Designer: Bruno Parenteau
- Programmer: Edgar Parente
- Artist: Jonathan Jacques-Belletete
- Writers: Mathieu Larivière; Jonathan Jacques-Belletete
- Composer: Stéphane Primeau
- Engine: Unreal Engine 5
- Platforms: PlayStation 5; Windows; Xbox Series X/S; Nintendo Switch 2
- Release: Windows, PS5, XBX/S; September 4, 2025; Nintendo Switch 2; October 8, 2026
- Genre: Action-adventure
- Mode: Single-player

Hell Is Us is an action-adventure game developed by Rogue Factor and published by Nacon. It was released for PlayStation 5, Windows, and Xbox Series X/S on September 4, 2025. A port for Nintendo Switch 2 is scheduled to release on October 8, 2026.

== Gameplay ==
In the game, the player must fight against supernatural beings known as Hollow Walkers with various melee weapons.

Hell Is Us is an action-adventure video game played from a third-person perspective. In the game, the player assumes control of a soldier named Rémi, and fights against supernatural beings named "Hollow Walkers". Players can combat these creatures using a variety of melee weapons such as swords, polearms and axes, with each having their own attack style and speed. Rémi is also equipped with a drone which can be used to distract hostile creatures. Players need to manage both the health and stamina of Rémi. Stamina will gradually regenerate but health will not, though Rémi's maximum stamina at any given moment is limited by his current health level. Fighting in an exhausted state means that the player character attacks more weakly and is more vulnerable.

Hadea was described by the team as a "semi-open world", and the game tasks players to gather clues to find Rémi's parents. The game forgoes features commonly found in other games such as waypoints, quest logs and map markers. Players must listen to Rémi's conversations with non-playable characters in order to find out the locations of their objectives.

== Plot ==
=== Premise ===
An ON (Organized Nations) Peacekeeper named Rémi goes absent without leave and ventures into the war-torn country of Hadea to find his parents, only to discover that the region is infested with supernatural beings following a mysterious event named the "Calamity".

=== Synopsis ===
Rémi Letam awakens in the custody of the Ziel Council, a powerful secret organization made up of the world's rich and powerful as well as OMSIF, the council's private military force. Under the effects of a truth serum, Rémi explains to an interrogator that he joined the ON Peacekeepers as a pretext to sneak into his war-torn homeland of Hadea to search for his parents. He then begins to recount the events leading up to his capture.

Some time ago, Rémi arrives in Hadea, which is not only in the midst of a civil war between its Palomist and Sabinian ethnic groups, but also is infested with hostile supernatural creatures called Hollow Walkers that emerge from timeloops that perpetually repeat moments of intense emotion and violence. Rémi manages to scavenge weaponry from a fallen OMSIF military squad capable of fighting the Hollow Walkers and commandeers an abandoned APC. In search of his parents, Rémi travels to his birthplace of Jova, which is now under military occupation and besieged by Hollow Walkers. Rémi discovers that his father is named Vitalis, and is part of an enigmatic organization called the Vigil that is aware of the existence of the Hollow Walkers, but has already left the village. Following his father's trail, Rémi finds Vitalis mortally wounded after a battle with OMSIF forces. Recognising Rémi as his son, Vitalis explains he and the Vigil are sworn to protect Hadea and put a stop to the Calamity giving rise to the Hollow Walkers. He passes an item called the Keystone of Grief on to Rémi and bids him to find the journalist Tania Alver. Before dying, Vitalis claims that Rémi's mother is dead.

Rémi links up with Tania, and they continue to investigate the Vigil, discovering that the Keystone will unlock something referred to as the Failsafe, which can supposedly stop the Calamity. Eventually, they discover the door that the Keystone of Grief opens, but find they need three additional Keystones to open it. They also receive covert assistance from an OMSIF officer who allows them access to OMSIF's Ziel Server, which contains sensitive information about Hadea's history. Rémi follows the trail of the remaining keystones across Hadea, searching ruins and collapsing Timeloops along his journey.

As Rémi explores Hadea in search of the keystones, he discovers more about the secret history of Hadea, and about the Calamities that had previously occurred throughout the country's history. Rémi continues to be contacted by the OMSIF officer, who eventually reveals that she is Aribeth Letam, Rémi's mother who smuggled him out of Hadea. Before they can meet however, OMSIF discovers her betrayal and attempts to apprehend her, and she is seemingly killed in a struggle.

With all of the Keystones collected, Rémi unlocks the door leading to the Failsafe, which leads to a massive underground chamber containing the Eye of God, a large sphere believed to be the eye of the Hadean God Sethyris, the source of the Timeloops and subsequently the Hollow Walkers. OMSIF had already set up a lab to study the Eye, but the entire research team was wiped out by Hollow Walkers. Rémi fights his way through the Hollow Walkers and activates the Failsafe, which collapses the entire chamber and drops the Eye into a pool of lava below, seemingly destroying it. Rémi narrowly escapes the chamber but is captured by OMSIF forces.

Back in the present, the interrogator taunts Rémi that Aribeth betrayed the Vigil after being given falsified evidence that Vitalis informed the police about Rémi being smuggled out of Hadea. As the interrogator prepares to execute Rémi, Aribeth arrives and kills the interrogator, having faked her own death. She frees Rémi and escapes with him, telling him that they are going home.

In a post-credits scene, an OMSIF drone discovers that the Eye of God has survived the failsafe.

== Development and release ==
Hell Is Us was developed by Rogue Factor, the studio behind Mordheim: City of the Damned. The project was led by Jonathan Jacques-Belletete, the art director for Deus Ex: Human Revolution and its sequel, Deus Ex: Mankind Divided. According to Jacques-Belletête, the game was inspired by the 2018 film Annihilation, and the Southern Reach Trilogy by Jeff VanderMeer. The game adopted a minimalistic head-up display as the studio was influenced by games released in the 1990s and wanted to create an immersive experience in which players receive information in an "organic" way. Jacques-Belletete compared the combat system to those commonly found in hack and slash games, one that is neither overly easy nor hard.

Hell Is Us was announced by publisher Nacon in April 2022, and was originally scheduled to be released in 2023. The game resurfaced in September 2024 during PlayStation's State of Play livestream event. The game launched for PlayStation 5, Windows and Xbox Series X/S on September 4, 2025. In May 2026, a port for Nintendo Switch 2 was announced with a September 24, 2026 release date, but the port got delayed to avoid competition with other games scheduled to release the same month and is now scheduled to release on October 8, 2026.

== Reception ==
Reception

Aggregate scores
Aggregator	Score
Metacritic	(PC) 78/100 (PS5) 77/100 (XSXS) 78/100
OpenCritic	79% recommend

Review scores
Publication	Score
Destructoid	8/10
Eurogamer	3/5
Famitsu	8/10, 8/10, 8/10, 7/10
Game Informer	8.25/10
GameSpot	7/10
GamesRadar+	4/5
Hardcore Gamer	4/5
IGN	7/10
Push Square	9/10
Shacknews	9/10

Hell Is Us received "generally favorable" reviews from critics, according to review aggregator website Metacritic. Fellow review aggregator OpenCritic assessed that the game received strong approval, being recommended by 79% of critics. In Japan, four critics from Famitsu gave the game a total score of 31 out of 40.

In August 2026, Nacon announced that Hell Is Us had surpassed 1 million players across all platforms, less than a year after its release.
