= Toem 2 =

2026 video game

- Developer: Something We Made
- Publishers: Something We Made; popagenda
- Artist: Lucas Gullbo
- Composers: Jamal Green; Launchable Socks
- Engine: Unity
- Platforms: Windows; macOS; Linux; Nintendo Switch; Nintendo Switch 2; PlayStation 5
- Release: 29 September 2026
- Genres: Photography; Adventure
- Mode: Single-player

Toem 2 (stylized as TOEM 2) is a 2026 photography adventure game developed by Swedish independent studio Something We Made and published by Something We Made and popagenda. It is the sequel to Toem (2021), following the same photographer several years after the events of the first game. It was released on 29 September 2026 for Windows, macOS, Linux, Nintendo Switch, Nintendo Switch 2 and PlayStation 5.

The game retains its predecessor's monochrome art style and photography-based quests, but introduces more three-dimensional environments and additional ways to explore them, including jumping and climbing. New camera attachments allow players to manipulate objects in the environment while solving puzzles. Toem 2 received generally favourable reviews, with critics praising its presentation and photography mechanics, although some considered it too similar to the first game and criticised its short length.

== Gameplay ==
Toem 2 follows the unnamed photographer from Toem, several years after their first journey. The protagonist learns that the Whirling Birch is about to bloom during the Whirlhill Festival and leaves Homelanda to photograph the event.

The journey takes the player through several regions, including Cropten, Taletorp and Deltburg. Residents offer quests that generally involve photographing particular animals, people or objects. Completing quests earns stamps, which are used to obtain tickets allowing travel to subsequent regions.

As in the first game, exploration generally takes place from an elevated perspective, while using the camera switches to a first-person viewfinder. The sequel allows the protagonist to run, jump and climb, making it possible to explore areas that would previously have been inaccessible.

The camera remains the main means of completing quests. Players photograph subjects to satisfy requests and solve puzzles, while attachments acquired during the journey allow the camera to perform other tasks. For example, aiming the camera at particular objects can hammer nails or turn screws, allowing players to repair buildings and plumbing. Some quests require players to use these abilities across several locations or return to previously visited areas.

The player's journal records completed quests and photographed creatures. Players can also find collectible clothing, including costumes referencing other independent games, and take photographs outside the requirements of individual quests. A minimap helps players navigate the environments, which include larger indoor areas than those in the first game.

== Development and release ==
Following the completion of Toem, Something We Made experimented with several prototypes for other games. According to studio co-founder and artist Lucas Gullbo, none developed into a project that the team wanted to pursue. The studio had continued working on updates for Toem, however, and eventually decided to return to its setting for a sequel.

Toem 2 was developed using Unity, but was built largely from scratch rather than reusing the first game's codebase. The developers used tools they had created since completing Toem, allowing them to construct larger and more detailed environments. The team retained the series' monochrome visual style. Gullbo said that adding colour had frequently been suggested for a sequel, but the developers considered the black-and-white appearance part of the game's identity. The larger development team allowed for greater use of three-dimensional models while retaining the two-dimensional characters. Gullbo cited a 3D dinosaur skeleton created for the first game's Basto update as an early experiment with this approach. The sequel also introduced more freedom of movement and additional uses for the camera. Jamal Green and Launchable Socks returned to compose the soundtrack.

Something We Made announced Toem 2 on 10 December 2024, when it was in early development and scheduled for release in 2026. The announcement was made during the 2024 Wholesome Snack presentation. Gameplay footage was shown during the Day of the Devs Summer Game Fest presentation in June 2025. A free Steam demo featuring part of the Deltburg region was released on 6 June 2026. The full game was initially scheduled for release in summer 2026. On 6 August, Something We Made announced a release date of 29 September, explaining that additional development and polishing had extended production beyond the original window. Toem 2 was released on 29 September 2026 for Windows, macOS, Linux, Nintendo Switch, Nintendo Switch 2 and PlayStation 5.

== Reception ==
Reception

Aggregate scores
Aggregator	Score
Metacritic	PC: 81/100 (Note: Based on 15 reviews); PS5: 83/100 (Note: Based on 13 reviews); NS2: 81/100 (Note: Based on 7 reviews)
OpenCritic	87% recommend (Note: Based on 31 reviews)

Review scores
Publication	Score
GamesRadar+	4.5/5
Nintendo World Report	7.5/10
PC Gamer (US)	73/100
CGMagazine	9/10
This Is Game	7.7/10

Toem 2 received "generally favorable" reviews from critics, according to review aggregator website Metacritic. OpenCritic reported that 87% of critics recommended the game.

Reviewers praised the game's presentation, photography mechanics and characters, although opinions differed on how much it improved upon its predecessor. Sam Loveridge of GamesRadar+ gave the game 4.5 out of 5 stars, praising its writing, side quests and photography puzzles. She particularly enjoyed how photographs and objects encountered earlier could become useful during later quests, but wished the approximately four-hour adventure had been longer.

Ford James of Polygon considered the sequel an improvement on the original, praising the camera's new abilities, larger interior environments and addition of a minimap. He found the puzzles accessible without being frustrating and enjoyed the characters and humour. His main criticism was the game's short length, having completed it in approximately four hours despite wanting to explore more regions.

Jenni Lada of Siliconera praised the new camera mechanics and three-dimensional environments, finding that they worked well with the original game's visual style and quest structure. Jordan Biordi of CGMagazine gave the Nintendo Switch 2 version 9 out of 10. He praised the more detailed environments, greater use of darker shades within the monochrome presentation, expanded photography mechanics and soundtrack, although he found the puzzles relatively easy.

A review in the South Korean publication This Is Game awarded the game 7.7 out of 10. The reviewer praised its intuitive camera controls, interactions with residents, soundtrack and Korean localisation. However, they considered the three to four hours of gameplay insufficient, noting that only three regions contained substantial quests and collectibles. They also felt that the new camera interactions and quality-of-life improvements did little to distinguish the sequel from Toem.

Willem Hilhorst of Nintendo World Report gave the Nintendo Switch 2 version 7.5 out of 10. He found that the sequel made relatively few changes to its predecessor's gameplay, but considered it successful in delivering a similar experience. Samuel Heaney and David Flynn of GamingTrend similarly praised the improved visuals and mechanics but felt that the game repeated too many ideas from Toem. They reported taking approximately five hours to complete the journal and found the ending less satisfying than that of the original game.

Lauren Morton of PC Gamer gave the game 73 out of 100. She enjoyed its characters and visual presentation but found the puzzles too straightforward, arguing that the sequel offered fewer opportunities for satisfying problem-solving than other adventure games.
