= Foamstars =

2024 video game

- PlayStation Store cover
- Developer: Toylogic
- Publisher: Square Enix
- Directors: Chikara Saito; Yuya Kumagai
- Producer: Kosuke Okatani
- Designer: Atsushi Yamaguchi
- Programmer: Yuki Sato
- Artists: Kota Niihara; Gurihiru
- Writer: Yoichi Kato
- Composers: Syotaro Seo; Oliver Good; Keita Inoue; Kuniyuki Takahashi; Keigo Hoashi; Keiichi Hirokawa
- Platforms: PlayStation 4 PlayStation 5
- Release: February 6, 2024
- Genre: Third-person shooter
- Modes: Single-player, Multiplayer

Foamstars is a 2024 third-person shooter video game published by Square Enix. It is a 4v4 arena shooter, in which players use colorful foam to attack and build defensive structures. The game was announced during the 2023 PlayStation Showcase on May 24, 2023. It was released on February 6, 2024, exclusively for the PlayStation 4 and PlayStation 5.

Foamstars received support after release, receiving continuous seasonal updates until its final season concluded on January 17, 2025. On October 4, 2024, the game became free-to-play.

Upon release, Foamstars received mixed reviews from critics, who praised the game's core gameplay and art style, but criticised the amount of microtransactions. The game struggled to maintain its playerbase.

== Gameplay ==
Foamstars is a third-person shooter that is playable by up to eight players in online four-versus-four matches. The players are divided into two teams, which can be identified by the colour of their outline and foam. Players use their weapons to shoot foam, which can be used to damage players on the opposing team. Additionally, foam can be placed on the ground, creating foam banks, which can be surfed on or used as a cover. Players standing in the foam of the opposing team are slowed down. When the player's health reaches zero, they will be "foamed", appearing in a foam bubble. The effect can be removed if a teammate surfs into the foamed player. Being hit by a surfing enemy player while foamed makes the player "chilled" (a pun on killed), sending the player back to the starting point.

The game features eight characters, each possessing unique stats and abilities, including an ultimate ability called Superstar Skill.

The game includes a variety of PVP game modes, such as Smash the Star, Happy Bath Survival, and Rubber Duck Party. Additionally, there is a separate PVE horde mode, where you defend against waves of enemies called Bubble Beasties. This mode can be played both in single-player and multiplayer.

Energy stones are awarded for gameplay. They can be exchanged for bubble gems, which are used to upgrade the character. Cosmetic items, weapon skins, emotes and character packs can be purchased from the store or earned after playing a round via an optional battle pass.

== Development ==
Developer Toylogic is based in Tokyo, Japan. Foamstars was announced at the PlayStation Showcase 2023 livestream on May 24, 2023.

=== Release ===
The game was officially released on February 6, 2024. The game was available on the PlayStation Plus subscription for no additional cost until March 4, 2024, after which it was sold for $29.99 until it became free-to-play on October 4, 2024.

=== Post-release ===
The game went free-to-play on October 4, 2024. As compensation, players who owned the game before the free-to-play update received exclusive in-game items.

The game's final season started on December 13, 2024, and ended on January 17 of the following year.

== Reception ==
=== Pre-release ===
Upon reveal, Foamstars saw immediate comparison to Nintendo's Splatoon series, as both titles utilize non-lethal ammunition that doubles as a traversal mechanic and form of territory control. Leigh Price of Silconera would express in an editorial that while "Nintendo doesn’t have an exclusive right to make painting-turf gameplay," Foamstars' reveal trailer showcased several weapons that have direct counterparts in both appearance and function to those within Nintendo's third-person shooter franchise.

Foamstars producer Kosuke Okatani would later criticise these comparisons, remarking that Foamstars' gameplay diverges heavily outside that shared aspect, and saying that games like it and Splatoon should become their own genre, akin to metroidvania or soulslike, suggesting the term "party shooter".

=== Post-release ===
Reception

Aggregate scores
Aggregator	Score
Metacritic	57/100
OpenCritic	17% recommend

Review scores
Publication	Score
Digital Trends	3/5
Eurogamer	3/5
IGN	6/10
Shacknews	5/10

Foamstars received "mixed or average" reviews from critics, according to the review aggregation website Metacritic. OpenCritic determined that 17% of critics recommend the game. IGN gave it a 6/10, calling the combat mechanics "engaging", while criticising the game's single-player mode, microtransactions and optimization. Eurogamer gave it three stars out of five, praising the movement mechanics but criticising the amount of content, saying that after just three days "the game might have already exhausted its possibilities". Digital Trends gave it three stars out of five, praising the gameplay and characters, while criticising the voice acting quality, the single-player campaign and the "ludicrous" microtransactions.

On May 14, 2024, Square Enix admitted that Foamstars, along with Final Fantasy VII Rebirth and Final Fantasy XVI, failed to meet its monetary expectations, which affected the overall impact of the company. The sales figure for Foamstars were not disclosed.

=== AI cover controversy ===
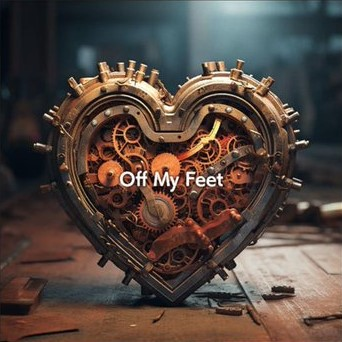
Cover art for the song "Off My Feet"

On release, people discovered that the in-game music in Foamstars has cover art that was generated using an artificial intelligence image generator tool Midjourney. Square Enix confirmed the use of AI, but defended the decision, saying that they wanted to "experiment" with artificial intelligence technologies and claiming that the generated assets make up "about 0.01% or even less" of game content. Previously, on January 1, 2024, Square Enix president Takashi Kiryu stated in a new year letter that the company will be "aggressive in applying AI and other cutting-edge technologies to both [their] content development and [their] publishing functions".
