= Saros (video game) =

2026 video game

- Developer: Housemarque (Note: Additional work by Nixxes Software, PlayStation Studios Creative Arts, and XDev)
- Publisher: Sony Interactive Entertainment
- Director: Gregory Louden
- Producer: Suvi Järvinen
- Programmer: Markku Velinen
- Artist: Simone Silverstri
- Writers: Alec Meer; Gregory Louden; Harry Krueger; William Shaughnessy
- Composer: Sam Slater
- Engine: Unreal Engine 5
- Platform: PlayStation 5
- Release: 30 April 2026
- Genre: Action
- Mode: Single-player

Saros is an action game developed by Housemarque and published by Sony Interactive Entertainment. The game was released for the PlayStation 5 on 30 April 2026.

== Gameplay ==
Players can use the "Soltari Shield" ability to absorb the energy of incoming projectiles.

Saros is a third-person action game that combines bullet hell, third-person shooter, and roguelite elements. The player controls Soltari Enforcer Arjun Devraj as he investigates a lost off-world colony on the planet Carcosa. The game features persistent resource and progression systems that allows the player to permanently upgrade Devraj's loadout with new weapons and suit enhancements for subsequent playthroughs after each character's death. Devraj is equipped with the Soltari Shield, a defensive tool that allows the player to block attacks and absorb the energy of incoming projectiles. This absorbed energy can then transform Devraj's right arm into the Carcosan Power Weapons and subsequently be discharged at hostile targets. While exploring the planet, the player finds Soltari Holograms. Collecting these holograms uncovers the planet's backstory and the events that unfolded there.

== Story ==
In the future, the Soltari corporation discovers the unique mineral Lucenite on the planet of Carcosa and deploys three Echelons to build a mining colony there. However, upon loss of contact with all three Echelons, Soltari sends an emergency response team, Echelon IV, to investigate the colony.

One of Echelon IV enforcers, Arjun Devraj (Rahul Kohli), awakens with no memory of what occurred in the days after they landed on Carcosa. Upon reaching the Echelon IV base camp, he learns one of the crew went mad and sabotaged their ship, destroying their only way to leave the planet and leaving Arjun and a handful of the crew as the only known survivors with the rest of the team either having died or gone insane. Arjun is tasked with tracking down a Soltari signal in hopes of finding the lost colony, and Arjun quickly learns Carcosa is strewn with the ruins of an extinct alien civilization infested with hostile wildlife. In addition, Carcosa's environment significantly changes whenever an eclipse occurs, with the wildlife becoming even more powerful and aggressive. Whenever Arjun is killed in battle, he is inexplicably revived back at the base camp with no memory of how he returned.

Arjun continues his search for the colony, hoping that he can also find his wife Nitya Chandran, who was part of Echelon I. He eventually finds the Echelon III colony, but it is completely abandoned save for Echelon II's Primary data unit. Upon analyzing the data unit, the Echelon IV team is shocked to discover that Echelon II went missing two centuries ago, meaning there is some form of time dilation on Carcosa. Refusing to believe the validity of the data, Arjun continues his investigation, heading deeper and deeper into the ruins of Carcosa's civilization. Through a series of recovered logs and recordings, as well as vivid visions of both his past and false reunions with Nitya, Arjun comes to understand what exactly happened on Carcosa.

Prior to leaving for Carcosa, Nitya had a strained relationship with Arjun due to his alcoholism, possible infidelity, and being implicated in the death of his partner Sebastian. She joined Echelon I as a way to get away from Arjun, and upon arrival on Carcosa, they made contact with an anomalous entity only known as the Yellow Shore. The Yellow Shore granted Echelon I godlike powers, but at the cost of their sanity being eroded as the Yellow Shore fed off of their greed and desires. Echelon I became the Overlords of Carcosa and enslaved Echelon II into building the alien civilization. However, Nitya eventually had a falling out with the King, Echelon I commander Arnold Delroy, which started a civil war that destroyed their civilization, resulting in Nitya being exiled, King withdrawing to the Yellow Shore, and the other Overlords scattering. While in exile, Nitya focused her efforts on containing the Yellow Shore, and built the Preserver to revive her in the event of her death. Due to his close connection with Nitya, Arjun could also use the Preserver, explaining how he is always resurrected upon death.

Arjun fights his way through the Overlords, defeats King, and finally reunites with Nitya. However, due to his experiences, he finally accepts that Nitya had already moved on from their relationship and takes responsibility for his own mistakes, which prevents the Yellow Shore from turning him into the new King and seemingly finally breaks the cycle Carcosa was trapped in. As she leaves, Nitya wonders what Arjun will do with the "new day" he has earned while he apologizes to her.

== Development and release ==
Following the release of Returnal (2021), Housemarque sought to expand upon the game's gameplay and narrative style within a new intellectual property. Ilari Kuittinen, CEO and co-founder of Housemarque, said that Saros was made possible due to the studio's acquisition by Sony in July 2021. The development began in 2022, with its budget totaling "tens of millions of euros". The studio was assisted by Nixxes Software, PlayStation Studios Creative Arts, and XDev. Nixxes contributed to art and gameplay elements, while Creative Arts provided support on sound design. The game was developed using Unreal Engine 5.

Saros was announced at the State of Play in February 2025, and released on 30 April 2026 for the PlayStation 5. In October 2026, Housemarque released the "Zenith" update, which adds a boss rush mode named Overlord Rush, a New Game Plus mode named Eclipse Layer, and additional accessibility options to the game.

== Reception ==
Reception

Aggregate scores
Aggregator	Score
Metacritic	87/100
OpenCritic	91% recommend (Note: Based on 136 reviews)

Review scores
Publication	Score
Eurogamer	4/5
Game Informer	9.25/10
GameSpot	9/10
GamesRadar+	4/5
IGN	7/10
Push Square	9/10
Shacknews	9/10
The Guardian	4/5
Video Games Chronicle	5/5

Saros received "generally favorable" reviews from critics, according to review aggregator website Metacritic. OpenCritic determined that 91% of critics recommended the game.

=== Awards ===
Year	Award	Category	Result	Ref.
2026	Golden Joystick Awards	Best Audio Design	Nominated	
2026	Golden Joystick Awards	Best Visual Design	Nominated	
2026	Golden Joystick Awards	Console Game of the Year	Nominated	
2026	The Game Awards 2026	Best Action Game	Pending	
2026	The Game Awards 2026	Best Performance (Rahul Kohli)	Pending	
