= Toem =

- Developer: Something We Made
- Publisher: Something We Made
- Programmer: Niklas Mikkelsen
- Artist: Lucas Gullbo
- Composers: Jamal Green; Launchable Socks
- Engine: Unity
- Platforms: Microsoft Windows; Nintendo Switch; PlayStation 5; Xbox One; Xbox Series X/S
- Release: Windows, Switch, PS5; 17 September 2021; Xbox One, Series X/S; 18 July 2023
- Genres: Photography, adventure
- Mode: Single-player

Toem (stylized as TOEM: A Photo Adventure) is a photography adventure game developed and published by Swedish independent game studio Something We Made. It was released in September 2021 for Windows, Nintendo Switch, and PlayStation 5 and in July 2023 for Xbox One, Xbox Series X/S, and Xbox Game Pass. The game received generally positive reviews upon release. It won in the Best Debut category at the 18th British Academy Games Awards.

A sequel, Toem 2, was released on September 29, 2026.

== Gameplay ==
In the game, the player assumes control of a young photographer who must ascend a mountain to witness a phenomenon known as "Toem". As the player character progresses, they will visit numerous Scandinavian towns and cities that are filled with non-playable characters (NPCs), who will ask the players for help. Gameplay primarily revolves around helping the locals by solving various puzzles using the player character's camera. Players explore the game's world from a top-down perspective, though it will shift to first-person when the player is taking photos. Players earn stamps by helping NPCs, and they can ride on a bus and progress to the next area once they have collected a sufficient number of stamps. The player character's outfits can also be customized.

== Development ==
Toem is the debut project for Swedish independent game development studio Something We Made. The project was conceptualized in 2018 by university students Lucas Gullbo and Niklas Mikkelsen. Both studied in the same university and were enrolled in courses about video game development. The two submitted an early prototype of Toem to a local game competition named Game Concept Challenge, and won. They were awarded 50,000 SEK from the competition, and using this fund, they joined an incubation program and established their own company to further work on the game. While Gullbo and Mikkelsen were responsible for the game's development, the team collaborated with Rumsklang for the game's audio, and Jamal Green and Launchable Socks for the game's original soundtracks. Independent game publisher Popagenda helped the team to market the game in order to reach a larger audience. The game had a budget of US$183,000. The company subsequently signed with Humble Bundle, which partially financed the game's development. However, the COVID-19 pandemic and the impacts it had on currency conversion caused the studio to struggle financially.

The game went through several significant design revisions throughout its four-year development process. Originally it was envisioned as a mobile point-and-click adventure game with some puzzle elements, but the team struggled a lot when they were designing the puzzles. Early versions of the game involved rotating bridges to form paths, and drawing electricity lines in order to activate objects in the game's world. Players often mislabeled the game as a proper puzzle game, and this prompted the team to redesign the game four times. Gullbo added that neither him nor Mikkelsen intended to develop a puzzle game since they were not familiar with designing a game for that genre, and they only "wanted to make a world to explore". Development was completely halted following Game Developer Conference 2019 as the team did not have a solid vision of the game's core gameplay mechanic. The core idea of Toem emerged late 2019. This version of the game had an emphasis on playfulness, and Gullbo sketched out many of the team's ideas in order to further solidify these gameplay concepts and scenarios. The game features a monochrome, hand-drawn artstyle, and it features a mix of 2D and 3D characters and objects. According to Gullbo, this artstyle was inspired by pop-up books.

Toem was originally set to be released in July 2021, though the team had to delay the game due to the slow development progress of the Switch version. The game was released on 17 September 2021, for Windows, PlayStation 5 and Nintendo Switch.

== Reception ==
Reception

Aggregate score
Aggregator	Score
Metacritic	(PC) 79/100 (NS) 79/100 (PS5) 80/100

Review scores
Publication	Score
Adventure Gamers	4.5/5
Destructoid	8/10
Easy Allies	8/10
Eurogamer	Essential
GameSpot	7/10
HobbyConsolas	85/100
IGN	8/10
Jeuxvideo.com	15/20
Nintendo Life	8/10
Nintendo World Report	7/10
Push Square	8/10
RPGFan	83/100
Shacknews	8/10

Toem received generally positive reviews upon release according to review aggregator website Metacritic. Critics frequently compared the game's core concepts to A Short Hike, an adventure game released in 2019. The team won in the Best Debut category at the 18th British Academy Games Awards. It was also nominated in the Excellence in Audio category at the 2022 Independent Games Festival Awards, though it lost to Inscryption.

Adventure Gamers gave the title 4.5 stars out of 5, writing, "Overall, Toem is a wonderful photography-focused experience, with easy-to-use controls, chill lo-fi beats, and an interesting world full of charm and whimsy to explore." Destructoid praised the design that encouraged player experimentation and felt that the game excellently executed its ideas, stating, "There is no design here that is questionable, no idea that feels unfinished. This is simply a well-crafted jaunt through a charming world." Eurogamer gave the game its "Essential" rating, proclaiming that Toem was "a reminder of what video games can be - what else they can be", and gave heavy praise to the title's in-game camera functionality, color scheme, and the intricate environment with intimate characters. GameSpot and Nintendo Life lauded the game's charming world, clever photo puzzles, soothing soundtrack, and visual style that provided depth, but wrote that getting stuck on poorly-explained puzzles occasionally proved to be frustrating. IGN gave Toem an 8 out of 10, claiming, "Good photos tell stories, and good photo-taking games tell many stories; therefore, TOEM is a very good photo-taking game", while praising its short but satisfying length, diorama-like areas, and intimate narratives. Push Square was similarly impressed with the PlayStation 5 version of the game and gave it 8 stars out of 10, but felt that the experience could potentially benefit from the use of the DualSense controller. Shacknews noted that the Switch version had occasional framerate issues and appreciated the easygoing nature of the game, stating that "this is a heck of a relaxing game... Toem has you take your time, frame things up, put the zoom on proper, and take as many tries as you'd like to get it right with good music to accompany the process."

=== Accolades ===
Year	Award	Category	Result	Ref.
2022
2022	Independent Games Festival Awards	Excellence in Audio	Nominated	
2022	18th British Academy Games Awards	Debut Game	Won	
