= Darwin's Paradox! =

2026 video game

- Developer: ZDT Studio
- Publisher: Konami
- Composer: Francis Chavihot; (Note: Additional music by Elea Lecoq and Flypop) (Note: Flypop is not credit as composer in the credits of the video game.)
- Engine: Unreal Engine 5
- Platforms: Nintendo Switch 2; PlayStation 5; Windows; Xbox Series X/S
- Release: April 2, 2026
- Genre: Platform
- Mode: Single-player

Darwin's Paradox! is a 2026 platform video game developed by ZDT Studio and published by Konami. In the game, players take on the role of an octopus named Darwin, who must use his intelligence and ability to survive and make it back to the ocean. The game was released on April 2, 2026, for Nintendo Switch 2, PlayStation 5, Windows, and Xbox Series X and Series S.

== Synopsis ==
A blue octopus named Darwin is swimming in the ocean with his friend, until they both become separated when a UFO abducts them and they are taken to a new food corporation known as "UFOOD". Now Darwin must break into the company's warehouse and rescue his cephalopod companion, all while discovering UFOOD's secrets involving experiments, mind control, and an Extraterrestrial invasion on Earth.

== Gameplay ==
The game is a 2.5D platforming game. In the game, players control the octopus Darwin, who, after waking up in an industrial complex must make his way back home to the ocean. Abilities are based on natural abilities of octopuses, such as arms with suction cups and shooting ink.

== Development ==
Darwin's Paradox! is Paris-based developer ZDT Studio's inaugural release. It was originally announced in 2022, as former Arkane Lyon studio director Romuald Capron's next game. At the time, it was reported that the game drew inspiration from Limbo and Little Nightmares. ZDT studio was founded by Gilles Aujard, Mikael Tanguy, and Cédric Lagarrigue. Gilles Aujard serves as the studio's Creative Director. Mikael Tanguy serves as Artistic Director.

The game's title comes from Charles Darwin's 1842 monograph The Structure and Distribution of Coral Reefs. Darwin's paradox refers to the ecosystem conundrum of how coral reefs can flourish even though tropical waters contain few nutrients.

== Release ==
It was formally revealed during the February 2025 PlayStation State of Play presentation. In November 2025, the game's release date was delayed to 2026. It was also announced at this time that the Nintendo Switch version was scrapped. Konami confirmed that the game would now be released for the Nintendo Switch 2 instead. Darwin's Paradox! was released on Nintendo Switch 2, PlayStation 5, Windows, and Xbox Series X/S on April 2, 2026.

== Reception ==
Reception

Aggregate scores
Aggregator	Score
Metacritic	(NS2) 70/100 (PC) 73/100 (PS5) 72/100 (XSXS) 74/100
OpenCritic	60% recommend (Note: Based on 87 reviews)

Review scores
Publication	Score
Destructoid	7/10
Edge	8/10
Game Informer	7/10
GameSpot	7/10
GamesRadar+	3/5
IGN	7/10
Nintendo World Report	6.5/10

Darwin's Paradox! received "mixed or average" reviews, according to review aggregator website Metacritic. Fellow review aggregator OpenCritic assessed that the game received fair approval, being recommended by 60% of critics.
