= 2021 in esports =

List of esports events in 2021 (also known as professional gaming).

== Calendar of events ==
=== Tournaments ===
| Date | Game | Event | Location | Winner(s) |
|---|---|---|---|---|
| March 5 – April 28 | PUBG: Battlegrounds | PUBG Global Invitational.S 2021 | Incheon, South Korea | Susquehanna Soniqs |
| March 27 – April 4 | Dota 2 | ONE Esports Singapore Major 2021 | Singapore | Invictus Gaming |
| May 6 – 23 | League of Legends | 2021 Mid-Season Invitational | Reykjavík, Iceland | Royal Never Give Up |
| May 11 – 23 | Rainbow Six Siege | Six Invitational 2021 | Paris, France | NiP |
| May 24 – 30 | Valorant | 2021 Valorant Masters: Stage 2 | Reykjavík, Iceland | Sentinels |
| June 7 – 13 | Mobile Legends: Bang Bang | Mobile Legends Southeast Asia Cup 2021 | Online | Execration |
| September 9 – 19 | Valorant | 2021 Valorant Masters: Stage 3 | Berlin, Germany | Gambit Esports |
| September 25 | Overwatch | 2021 Overwatch League Grand Finals | Online | Shanghai Dragons |
| October 7–17 | Dota 2 | The International 2021 | Bucharest, Romania | Team Spirit |
| October 5 – November 6 | League of Legends | 2021 League of Legends World Championship | Reykjavík, Iceland | Edward Gaming |
| October 23 – November 7 | Counter-Strike: Global Offensive | PGL Major Stockholm 2021 | Stockholm, Sweden | Natus Vincere |
| November 19 – December 19 | PUBG: Battlegrounds | PUBG Global Championship 2021 | Incheon, South Korea | NewHappy |
| November 13 – 21 | League of Legends: Wild Rift | 2021 League of Legends: Wild Rift Horizon Cup | Singapore | Da Kun Gaming |
| November 26 – 28 | Brawl Stars | Brawl Stars World Finals 2021 | Online & Bucharest, Romania | ZETA DIVISION |
| December 1 – 12 | Valorant | 2021 VALORANT Champions | Berlin, Germany | Team Ascend |
| December 3 – 5 | Clash Royale | Clash Royale League World Finals 2021 | Online | Mugi |
| December 4 – 5 | Call of Duty: Mobile | 2021 Call of Duty: Mobile World Championship - Western Finals | Online | Tribe Gaming |
| December 11 – 12 | Call of Duty: Mobile | 2021 Call of Duty: Mobile World Championship - Eastern Finals | Online | Blacklist International-Ultimate |
| December 6 – 19 | Mobile Legends: Bang Bang | MLBB M3 World Championship | Singapore | Blacklist International |

=== Professional league seasons ===
| Country | Game | League | Venue | Champion | Runner-up | Result |
|---|---|---|---|---|---|---|
| Philippines | Mobile Legends: Bang Bang | MPL Philippines Season 7 | Online | Blacklist International | Execration | 4–3 |
| Philippines | Mobile Legends: Bang Bang | MPL Philippines Season 8 | Manila, Philippines | Blacklist International | ONIC Philippines | 4–1 |
