= Alba: A Wildlife Adventure =

2020 adventure game

- Developer: Ustwo Games
- Publishers: Ustwo Games; PID Games (Windows and consoles)
- Engine: Unity
- Platforms: iOS, macOS, tvOS, Microsoft Windows, Nintendo Switch, PlayStation 4, PlayStation 5, Xbox One, Xbox Series X/S
- Release: iOS, macOS, tvOS, Microsoft Windows: WW: December 11, 2020; Nintendo Switch, PlayStation 4, PlayStation 5, Xbox One, Xbox Series X/S: WW: June 9, 2021
- Genre: Adventure
- Mode: Single-player

Alba: A Wildlife Adventure is a 2020 open-world adventure game developed and published by Ustwo Games. It was released on iOS, macOS and Windows in 2020, and for Nintendo Switch, PlayStation 4, PlayStation 5, Xbox One and Xbox Series X/S in 2021. The Windows and console ports were published by PID Games along with Ustwo. The game focuses on exploring the island and conserving wildlife.

== Synopsis ==
The game takes place in and around Secarral, a fictional island town in Spain. The protagonist, a British Asian girl named Alba Singh, flies from the United Kingdom to visit her grandparents for a week-long vacation. After helping to rescue a stranded dolphin, she and her friend Inés form a wildlife rescue league. The next day the mayor announces that the local nature reserve, which suffered from a wildfire, will be developed into a luxury hotel. The girls decide to collect signatures into a petition to stop this. They help with multiple cleanups, repairs and animal rescue tasks, as well as photographing and cataloguing the local wildlife to raise awareness. One of the ultimate goals is to discover an elusive Iberian lynx, which follows Alba throughout the game's story.

== Development ==
PID Games published Alba: A Wildlife Adventure for iOS, macOS, and Microsoft Windows on December 11, 2020. Nintendo Switch, PlayStation 4, PlayStation 5, Xbox One and Xbox Series X/S ports followed on June 9, 2021.

== Reception ==
Reception

Aggregate scores
| Aggregator | Score |
|---|---|
| Metacritic | iOS: 84/100; PC: 79/100; NS: 80/100 |
| OpenCritic | 89% recommend |

Review scores
| Publication | Score |
|---|---|
| Destructoid | 8/10 |
| Edge | 7/10 |
| Game Informer | 8/10 |
| Pocket Gamer | 4.5/5 |

Award
| Publication | Award |
|---|---|
| Apple Inc. | Apple Design Awards, Social Impact (2021) |

It received positive reviews on Metacritic. Christian Donlan of Eurogamer praised the realism present in the game's environments, writing "All these animals are a delight when they're knocking about, and when you find them flapping in oil or trapped in the shrink-wrap handcuffs from an idle six-pack, it's impossible not to leap in and help them immediately." Donlan also enjoyed the island setting of Pinar del Mar, calling it "the Spanish holiday island of everyone's dreams" and "beautifully observed". Game Informer' Marcus Stewart liked the photography mechanic of Alba, although he expressed disappointment at the lack of variety among animals. He also appreciated the straightforward side quests on the island. Jupiter Hadley, writing for Pocket Gamer, enjoyed how the player's actions had an impact on the island. Hadley praised the game for having a good message about advocating for a cause.

The game won Apple Design Awards in 2021 in the Social Impact category.
