= Little Devil Inside =

Upcoming action-adventure video game

- Developer: Neostream Interactive
- Publisher: Neostream Interactive
- Engine: Unreal Engine 5
- Platforms: PlayStation 4; PlayStation 5; Windows; Nintendo Switch; Xbox One
- Genre: Action-adventure
- Modes: Single-player, Multiplayer

Little Devil Inside is an upcoming action-adventure video game developed and published by Neostream Interactive. The game's single-player and co-operative multiplayer modes both follow the professional and personal lives of explorers searching for monsters & supernatural events in a 19th-century-inspired world. It is planned for initial release on PlayStation 4, PlayStation 5 and Windows, with Nintendo Switch and Xbox One versions to come later. First announced in via Kickstarter in 2015, the game has been in development for more than a decade, and was described as vaporware, though the developers continued to give sporadic updates.

== Gameplay ==
Little Devil Inside is a third-person 3D action-adventure role-playing video game with elements of survival, combat, and open-world exploration; however, its developers, Neostream Interactive, have described the game's survival elements as "rather easy" compared to other games in the survival genre, stating that the game is "not about how long you can survive in a certain environment", instead being about "taking a trip for a mission, and surviving during the process." Examples of in-game survival elements include harvesting water from cacti, chopping wood to make a fire, and cooking food obtained from hunting. Players can use a variety of weapons and tools to survive and accomplish their objectives, such as a sword, shield, gun, grappling hook, bombs, tent, and cooking equipment.

The game takes places across multiple locations with differing environmental conditions, including desert, snow, forest, mountains, swampland, and deep-sea diving. These areas are connected by a "world map", which uses tilt-shift effects to create the appearance of miniature scale. Although this overall map is available, players cannot "fast forward" their travel to these locations; instead, they must take direct control of their transportation during the journey and respond to events that occur on the way, such as encounters with NPCs, overcoming obstacles (such as a flock of sheep), or being ambushed by enemies. Players also have the ability to upgrade their transportation (alongside their weapons and armor) as the game progresses.

Between missions, players can return to the safety of the game's home town to rest and prepare for further adventures (such as talking with NPCs, gathering information on the next location through library research, and preparing for its weather conditions).

The game also includes roguelike gameplay elements: In the event of a player's character dying, that character cannot be resurrected; however, the player can take subsequent characters to that same location in order to recover any lost equipment.

The game also supports co-operative multiplayer (including local multiplayer), where more than one player participates in the same mission. Additionally, the game features the possibility of random encounters between players.

== Plot ==
Little Devil Inside takes place in a 19th-century, Victorian-inspired setting, with elements of steampunk. The developers describe it as a "surreal, unrealistic world ... somewhere between heaven and hell." The main character, Billy, is a swordsman, employed by a research team (led by college professor Vincent and his colleague, Dr. Oliver) to travel the world in search of the supernatural and other unusual incidents. The ultimate objective set out by the researchers is to assemble a complete encyclopaedia of "all phenomenal existence."

The game also takes a satirical angle on the video game cliché of hunting monsters for financial reward by also exploring the more mundane aspects of such characters' lives and their financial inequality with their employers.

== Development and release ==
Little Devil Inside was originally conceived by its creative director, Kody Lee, and was developed as the first game by Seoul's Neostream Interactive, who initially began in 1998 as a multimedia design & production company. Development began originally using the Unity Engine, then later switched to the Unreal Engine by Epic Games. The game was first announced through a Kickstarter campaign in April 2015, alongside a pre-alpha trailer and gameplay footage, and an entry on Steam Greenlight. At the time of the original campaign, the game had an approximate release window of "Fall 2016." Backed by over 5,000 people, the Kickstarter campaign raised A$306,515 by its completion in May 2015. Subsequently, the game's original release window was pushed back, due to an increase in its scope.

In December 2017, the developers released a new trailer for the game, and began communicating a planned release date of "late 2018," with PC planned as the first release platform; however, that window passed without the game being released.

The game's original campaign stated that it was planned for release on Steam platforms (Windows, macOS, and Linux), PlayStation 4, and Xbox One, with Nintendo's Wii U console added later as a stretch goal; however, during the PlayStation 5 reveal event in June 2020, it was announced that Little Devil Inside would be a timed console exclusive for the PlayStation 4 and PlayStation 5. In a subsequent message to their Kickstarter backers, Neostream announced that they plan to release concurrently with PC as part of their agreement with Sony; however no mention was made of Xbox or Nintendo platform releases. A later website update for the game confirmed a planned release for Windows, and that releases for Nintendo Switch (replacing that of the Wii U) and Xbox One were still planned for once the PlayStation exclusivity period expires.

During the CES trade show in January 2021, a presentation made by Sony included a footnote that Little Devil Inside was planned for release in July 2021; however, Sony subsequently removed this release date (and those for other games) from the presentation without comment, and the game was not released within that period.

As announced by Sony via Twitter on the preceding day, their "State of Play" livestream event on 27 October, featured the "first in-depth look" at Little Devil Inside. The new footage highlighted elements such as the game's world map, and displayed a release date of 2022. This release date was further refined in December 2021 when an Instagram post from PlayStation showed teaser footage of the game with a footnote of "Releasing Winter 2022"; however, the release was delayed until further notice.

In February 2024 (by which time lack of updates had caused public speculation about the game's cancellation) the development team published an update post through Kickstarter. They apologized to the community for being unable to deliver the game according to schedule (citing internal conflict as one of the main causes), and that the team had been downsized. They also released a new gameplay trailer and revealed that development had switched to Unreal Engine 5. During the update, it was stated that the team was now "much stronger" and in publishing discussions for the game's release.

=== Visual style ===
The game leans towards a minimalist visual style, with only a minimal user interface and avoidance of menus wherever possible, instead requiring players to ascertain details by observing visual cues and communicating with their character. For example, characters will begin to limp if they are hurt, cough if they become sick, or shiver if they become too cold. Similarly, although the various characters available to players will have different traits and stats (e.g. boastful characters hiding when they are injured, female-obsessed characters having narrower vision), these will not be explicitly displayed to the player, instead requiring them to be deduced. According to the team, the intended design essence and aesthetics is to create a subtle but powerful sense of emptiness for each player to fill for themselves throughout the game experience."
