= Jane Perry (actress) =

Canadian actress

- Education: Studio 58
- Occupation: Actress
- Years active: 1995–present

Jane Elizabeth Perry is a Canadian actress. She is best known for her work as Diana Burnwood in the Hitman series, a role she has played in every major release of the series since 2016's Hitman. She is also known for portraying protagonist Selene in 2021's Returnal, for which she won the BAFTA Award for Performer in a Leading Role at the 18th British Academy Games Awards, and Alyssa Ashcroft in the 2026 survival-horror Resident Evil Requiem.

== Personal life ==
Perry is of Irish and English descent. Her grandfather Frederic Perry was a cousin of scriptwriter Jimmy Perry. She is currently based in London, UK. She attended the University of Victoria, BC where she studied Theatre and Theatre Arts Management, and Studio 58 where she gained a Diploma in Theatre Acting.

== Professional life ==
Perry is a classically trained actress who has worked on stage in both the UK and Canada, in TV series and films. She has also worked as a motion capture artist and as a voice actor. As a voice over artist, she is best known for her work in video games such as Hitman, Wildlands, Alien: Isolation, Squadron 42, Dreamfall Chapters, Cyberpunk 2077 and Returnal. She is also heard in Need for Speed: Hot Pursuit, both in the original and remastered versions.

Her TV credits include: Ransom for CBS, A Royal Winter for Hallmark, The Assets for ABC, The Reckoning for ITV, Spooks for BBC, Superstorm for BBC, The X-Files and Millennium for Fox. Her theatre credits include Strange Interlude at the National Theatre, Generous at the Finborough Playhouse, Twelfth Night at the Finborough Theatre, and five years as a lead actress at the Shaw Festival in Ontario, Canada.

== Filmography ==
=== Anime ===
Year	Title	Role	Notes
1995	Ronin Warriors	Kayura	Show
1996	Galaxy Express 999	Shadow	Film, Ocean Studios dub
1997	Adieu Galaxy Express 999	Mimay, Kei Yuki	Film
1997	Grey: Digital Target	Nova	Film
1996	Dragon Ball Z	Mrs. Brief	Show
1998	Night Warriors: Darkstalkers' Revenge	Mei-Ling	Show

=== Video games ===
Year	Title	Role	Notes
2010	Need for Speed: Hot Pursuit	Cars description narrator	
2011	Kinect Disneyland Adventures	Voice	
2011	Crysis 2	Tara Strickland	
2012	007 Legends	Holly Goodhead	
2012	Need for Speed: Most Wanted	Dispatch voice	
2012	Forza Horizon	Anna	
2012	Hitman: Absolution	In-game tutorial and mission narrator	
2013	Crysis 3	Tara Strickland	
2013	Need for Speed: Rivals	Dispatch	
2014	Alien: Isolation	Diane Verlaine	
2014	Forza Horizon 2	Anna	
2014	Dreamfall Chapters	Sister Alessandra / Helena Chang	
2015	Grey Goo	M.U.M, additional voices	
2015	Dirty Bomb	Nader	
2015	Soma	Maggie Komorebi / Nadine Masters / Andrea Suther	
2016	Hitman	Diana Burnwood	
2016	Quantum Break	Voice	
2016	Steep	Monte Rosa	
2017	Tom Clancy's Ghost Recon Wildlands	Karen Bowman	
2017	Mass Effect: Andromeda	Additional voices	
2018	Lego The Incredibles	Jayne Johnson	
2018	Hitman 2	Diana Burnwood	
2019	Tom Clancy's Ghost Recon Breakpoint	Karen Bowman	DLC "Operation: Motherland"
2020	Cyberpunk 2077	Rogue Amendiares	
2020	Control	Additional voices	DLC: "AWE"
2021	Hitman 3	Diana Burnwood	
2021	Returnal	Selene Vassos	
2022	As Dusk Falls	Sharon Holt	
2023	Baldur's Gate 3	Mystra	
2023	RoboCop: Rogue City	Gloria Lindberg	
2023	DreamWorks All-Star Kart Racing	Tigress	
2025	Dead Take	Lia Cain	
2025	Vampire: The Masquerade – Bloodlines 2	Lou Graham	
2026	Resident Evil Requiem	Alyssa Ashcroft	
2026	Saros	Sheridan Bouchard	
2027	Clutch †	Emery Whitman	
TBA	Emberville	Unannounced role	In production

=== Films ===
Year	Title	Role	Notes
1997	Perfect Body	Mrs. Darrington	Television film
1997	Indefensible: The Truth About Edward Brannigan	Dr. Jan Royce	Television film
1999	Fatal Error	ATM Teller	Television film
1999	Our Guys: Outrage at Glen Ridge	Lisa Marie Peterson	Television film
2005	The Score	Dr. Lynne Magnusson	
2007	In the Spider's Web	Geraldine	TV movie
2008	How to Lose Friends and Alienate People	Mrs. Harding	
2011	Foster	June	
2013	World War Z	UN delegate	
2015	Ashes	Rebecca Soter	
2016	Genius	Johns Hopkins hospital nurse	
2016	A Hologram for the King	Ruby	
2016	The Autopsy of Jane Doe	Lieutenant Wade	
2016	Fantastic Beasts and Where to Find Them	Female customer	
2017	Borg McEnroe	Kay McEnroe	
2017	The Beyond	Gillian	
2017	Phantom Thread	Mrs. Vaughan	
2017	A Royal Winter	Janice	Television film
