= Ratchet & Clank: Rift Apart =

2021 video game

- Developer: Insomniac Games (Note: Ported to Windows by Nixxes Software)
- Publisher: Sony Interactive Entertainment
- Directors: Marcus Smith; Mike Daly
- Producer: Joe Castagno
- Programmer: Mike Fitzgerald
- Artists: Jason Hickey; Gavin Goulden
- Writers: Lauren Mee; Nick Folkman; Mary Kenney; Max Folkman
- Composers: Mark Mothersbaugh; Wataru Hokoyama
- Series: Ratchet & Clank
- Platforms: PlayStation 5; Windows
- Release: PlayStation 5; June 11, 2021; Windows; July 26, 2023
- Genres: Platform, Third-person shooter
- Mode: Single-player

Ratchet & Clank: Rift Apart (Note: Known as Ratchet & Clank: Parallel Trouble in Japan) is a 2021 third-person shooter platform video game developed by Insomniac Games and published by Sony Interactive Entertainment for the PlayStation 5. It is the ninth main installment in the Ratchet & Clank series, and serves as a sequel to Ratchet & Clank: Into the Nexus (2013) while also building on elements introduced in the 2016 remake of the first game. A port for Windows, developed by Nixxes Software, was released on July 26, 2023, marking the series' first release outside of a PlayStation console. The game received positive reviews from critics, with particular praise given to its gameplay, visuals, combat, humor, and technical advancements. It had sold over 3.97 million units by June 2023.

== Gameplay ==
Ratchet uses a "Rift Tether" to quickly warp between areas.

The game shares many gameplay similarities with Ratchet & Clank (2016) and other entries in the series. It retains elements of previous Ratchet & Clank games, such as strafing, gunplay, collection of bolts, automatic weapon and health upgrades, manual Raritanium weapon upgrading and gadgets. The main playable character is Ratchet. He is accompanied by his robotic friend and sidekick Clank, who is hung on his back. Additionally, the game has a playable female Lombax named Rivet, as well as a robot similar to Clank, Kit. The player navigates Ratchet and Rivet through diverse environments across a multitude of levels, defeating enemies with an array of varied weapons and gadgets, and traversing obstacles to complete key mission objectives.

The game introduces to the series the concept of real-time near instantaneous travel between different areas, planets and other worlds within gameplay scenes via a system of inter-dimensional portals. In order for the player to utilize this feature, a new mechanic dubbed the "Rift Tether" is introduced in Ratchet and Rivet's arsenal that pulls them from one side of a portal to another, allowing them to move quickly between points. The game features the return of planets explored in previous entries with a dimensional twist, through their alternate counterparts, alongside new planets not seen previously in the franchise. The game features enhanced mobility and traversal options with the addition of moves such as dashing and wall running. In addition, the game's arsenal features a mix of brand new weapons and returning classics from prior installments.

The game features an assortment of accessibility options, including a high contrast mode and toggles for simplified traversal, camera sensitivity, flight assistance, etc., to ensure that all players can enjoy the gameplay and complete the story.

== Plot ==
Ratchet and Clank are celebrated as galactic heroes during a parade hosted by Captain Quark, Skid McMarx, and Rusty Pete on Corson V. Clank reveals that he has repaired the Dimensionator, (Note: As depicted in Ratchet & Clank: Into the Nexus (2013)) a device capable of opening rifts to other dimensions so that Ratchet can search for the Lombax race and his missing family. However, Doctor Nefarious attacks the parade and attempts to steal the Dimensionator. During the struggle, Ratchet unthinkingly shoots the Dimensionator, which causes dimensional rifts to begin opening randomly. Ratchet, Clank, and Dr. Nefarious are transported to an alternate universe, where the Dimensionator explodes, damaging the fabric of space and time and separating the three. Clank awakens to find himself alone and now missing his right arm from the blast. He is discovered and picked up by a female Lombax named Rivet. Meanwhile, Dr. Nefarious ends up in a throne room, where he is mistaken for Emperor Nefarious, an alternate version of himself who, unlike him, has never been defeated and rules over the galaxy. Ratchet, elsewhere, finds himself alone and starts his search for Clank. With the emperor currently absent on a conquest, Dr. Nefarious secretly assumes his identity and sends his new minions after Ratchet and Rivet.

While searching, Ratchet witnesses Rivet escaping the planet with Clank. Ratchet encounters Phantom (the alternate Skidd), a member of the resistance opposed to the emperor, which Rivet is a part of, who gifts him an electronic helper named Glitch to help him get a ship to follow her. Rivet takes Clank to her hideout on Sargasso to interrogate him, not believing his words about the dimensional rifts due to her distrust in robots. They discover a dimensional anomaly on the planet which Clank investigates, making contact with a prophet named Gary, who enlists his help in repairing other dimensional anomalies to prevent the Dimensional Cataclysm. Rivet learns the truth by looking into Clank's memories and repairs Clank's communicator so they are able to contact Ratchet and devise a plan to rebuild the Dimensionator.

Ratchet heads out to find the blueprint for the Dimensionator, and recruits one of Gary's robot apprentices, Kit, to be his partner. Kit warns Ratchet that she is a warbot built by the emperor and worries she might lose control of her programming and attack him, but Ratchet reassures her that they make a good team. They head to a secret lab on Cordelion to forge a new Dimensionator, while Rivet and Clank head out to Blizar Prime to gather the Phase Quartz needed to power it. After it is accidentally destroyed, the two search for the mythical Fixer on Torren IV who can repair anything and convince him to overcome his own self-doubt to repair the Phase Quartz. Ratchet and Rivet meet in the Scarstu Debris Field, and Kit becomes Rivet's partner. They complete the Dimensionator, only for Dr. Nefarious to arrive and steal it. Dr. Nefarious is defeated in battle, but the real Emperor Nefarious arrives, easily defeating Ratchet and Rivet and stealing the Dimensionator for himself, which he plans to use to eliminate Captain Quantum (the alternate Captain Qwark) and destroy the resistance.

Rivet pursues the emperor, but he uses the Dimensionator to halt her tracks. Rivet tells Kit about how she lost her arm to a warbot attack, with Kit realizing she was the one responsible. Meanwhile, Ratchet heads out to Ardolis to try and warn Quantum, but fails to stop the emperor from banishing Quantum through a rift. The emperor celebrates conquering the universe but doesn't feel fulfilled until he realizes he can use the Dimensionator to conquer every dimension. Spying on the emperor using a device that Quantum bugged on him, Ratchet and Rivet realize the emperor will need the Dimensional Map and head out to intercept him. Rivet and Kit board the emperor's flagship and rescue Gary, who reveals he hid the map inside an anomaly. Ratchet and Clank recover the map but are banished through a rift by the emperor. Kit transforms into her warbot form to try and stop the emperor, shocking Rivet, but Kit ends up being banished as well.

Left alone, Rivet heads to Viceron for the prison facility the emperor has banished all of his enemies to and stages a prison break, freeing Ratchet and Clank as well as the rest of the resistance. However, still feeling guilty over causing the loss of Rivet's arm, Kit decides to leave the group. As the resistance regroups, the emperor begins invading other dimensions, starting with Ratchet and Clank's home dimension. Ratchet, Clank, Rivet, and the resistance pursue the emperor through the rifts. Ratchet and Clank destroy the emperor's power suit, and Kit returns to hold his forces at bay while Rivet confronts the emperor. Working together, everybody, including Dr. Nefarious, who grew irritated over how his alternate self treated him, defeat and send the emperor to his demise through a rift. Clank recovers the Dimensionator and uses it to repair the dimensions. Rivet and Kit repair their relationship, and before they return to their dimension, Ratchet asks them if they would like to make "one stop" first.

During the credits, citizens of Nefarious City are seen dismantling the regime's legacy, Dr. Nefarious reunites with Lawrence, who is now a father, and Gary shares his findings with his father, the Plumber. With reality saved and the Dimensionator in their possession, Ratchet, Clank, Rivet, and Kit take the opportunity to hang out together, repair the damage the emperor caused, build a new arm for Clank, and go on further adventures.

== Development ==
Ratchet & Clank: Rift Apart was developed by Insomniac Games as a PlayStation 5 exclusive title. Unlike past games in the Ratchet & Clank series where development was helmed by the secondary team in North Carolina, Rift Apart was developed by the entire team from both studios. It features a full-length, stand-alone storyline that is intended to appeal to veterans and newcomers of the series, serving as a follow-up to both the 2013 game Ratchet & Clank: Into the Nexus and the 2016 remake of the first game. The game was directed by creative director Marcus Smith and game director Mike Daly.

Insomniac Games received PlayStation 5 development kits early on in the console's development cycle and the team promptly started work on conceptualization. Creative director Marcus Smith stated that, initially, they were confronted with the quandary of how to make the game appealing to both long-running series fans and new players who may have not even been born when the last full-length game in the series was released. Initial ideas for Rift Apart came about after the team had multiple discussions about the possibilities offered by improvements made in next-gen hardware. Game director, Mike Daly said that they knew from the start the game would be a PS5 exclusive and they wanted to take advantage of that fact. He added that "we wanted to make a game that was new and took the experience further than it had before. When we were thinking about what we could do, knowing what we could never do before, it became clear that so much of the structure of games is informed by how you're able to load things into memory." Regarding the ease up of workflows due to the PS5's custom-designed SSD, Smith stated that the "game utilizes dimensions and dimensional rifts, and that would not have been possible without the solid state drive of the PlayStation 5," further adding that it is "screamingly fast. It allows us to build worlds and project players from one place to another in near instantaneous speeds. It is an unbelievable game-changer in terms of, we can now do gameplay where you're in one world and the next moment you're in another." Smith recalled that the team had an idea on leveraging dimensional travel into parallel worlds, citing the 1946 film It's a Wonderful Life as inspiration for the game's direction. Smith stated that the team's curiosity was piqued by the question, "What would a different dimension of Ratchet and Clank be like? And in particular, what would Ratchet's life be like if he didn't have a Clank?".

On building the game's traversal mechanics, there was a learning opportunity for Insomniac Games to leverage their experiences from past titles they have developed, to improve upon and expand on the traversal mechanics in Rift Apart. Smith stated that "I think the lessons that we learned from Sunset Overdrive and Spider-Man whereas we might've just had a hook shot somewhere, now we're having areas where you can Hook Shot and then use Phantom Dash and then wall run and then rift tether and it flows together really nicely".

Intrigued by the concept of different choices, outcomes and circumstances shaping the trajectory of one's life, the idea of Rivet was born in tandem with the exploration of the alternate universe setting in the franchise. Lead writer Lauren Mee and lead animator, Lindsay Thompson, were interested in a new character that would have their own perspective, and survival instincts embodied by their given circumstances in a darker universe. Thompson described Rivet as having a "tough exterior and perceived coolness, she's never cynical, dark or cruel. Sure, she might not know the best way to act in a social situation, but she sure as hell isn't shy." Smith noted that the team were interested in representing complexity and nuance with parallel counterparts of characters, citing the importance of not depicting characters like Rivet as a "one dimensional" antithesis to their counterparts in every way. Mee stressed that it was important that Rivet's lived experiences have not left her jaded, as though she comes with her own struggles, they have not robbed the hope she has in saving her universe against the forces of Emperor Nefarious. Following the creation of Rivet, several auditions were held to find the right voice for the character. The studio later recruited Jennifer Hale, who had previously voiced the female Commander Shepard in the Mass Effect series. Jim Ward, who had voiced Captain Qwark since the series's inception, was unable to reprise his role for Rift Apart due to his declining health, as he was diagnosed with both a precocious form of Alzheimer's disease and COVID-19; he was replaced by Scott Whyte and died in 2025.

After a launch-day patch, Rift Apart features a 4K-resolution fidelity mode running at 30 frames per second and two 60 frames per second modes, dubbed as "Performance" and "Performance Ray-Tracing", running at a lower base resolution. The game also supports HDR. The game takes advantage of the PlayStation 5's DualSense controller, Tempest Engine and dedicated ray tracing hardware to support advanced haptic feedback, 3D spatial audio and real-time ray tracing effects. The PlayStation 5's increased processing power and inclusion of a custom solid-state drive enables the game to feature a greater variety of NPCs, enemies, visual effects, and objects within gameplay scenes than prior entries. Enhancements in the game design aim to significantly reduce loading times when jumping between worlds.

Rift Apart "went gold" on May 13, 2021, according to an Insomniac Games report, meaning that physical copies of the game were ready to be produced, with any further development being patched into the game through software updates.

=== Music ===
Ratchet & Clank: Rift Apart features an original score composed primarily by Mark Mothersbaugh and Wataru Hokoyama. Known for his works in Hotel Transylvania, The Lego Movie, Thor: Ragnarok and The Croods: A New Age, Mothersbaugh was contacted early in the game's development. Insomniac Games wanted the soundtrack to evoke a retro-futuristic sound; this approach informed the sound direction, and led to their subsequent search for the right composer to fulfill this vision. They requested Mothersbaugh who later agreed to compose for the game. Mothersbaugh went for a more experimental sound using various instruments including synthesizers to compose the score. By combining eclectic synth sounds with orchestral beats, Mothersbaugh was able to deliver a more cinematic sound experience in line with the guiding vision of the studio.

== Release ==
Ratchet & Clank: Rift Apart was announced at the PlayStation 5 reveal stream on June 11, 2020. At Gamescom's Opening Night Live on August 27, 2020, Insomniac Games presented a 7-minute gameplay demo of the game. On February 11, 2021, Insomniac Games announced several pre-order editions for the game. The standard edition includes a graphically upgraded version of the Carbonox armor from Ratchet & Clank: Going Commando, as well as the Pixelizer weapon from Ratchet & Clank (2016). The digital deluxe edition contains five armor sets, a sticker pack for the new Photo Mode, 20 Raritanium used to upgrade weapons, and a digital soundtrack and artbook. In Sony's State of Play presentation on April 29, 2021, a lengthy 16-minute gameplay trailer was released. Rift Apart was released for the PlayStation 5 on June 11, 2021. On May 30, 2023, a Windows port, developed by Nixxes Software, was announced for a July 26 release. It features ultra widescreen support and ray tracing.

== Sequel ==
Ratchet & Clank: Rift Apart follows the story of Ratchet & Clank: Into the Nexus. In December 2023, a group of hackers leaked over 1.67 terabytes of data from Insomniac Games. Within that data was a supposed planned sequel to Ratchet & Clank: Rift Apart planned to be released in the year 2029.

== Reception ==
Reception

Aggregate scores
Aggregator	Score
Metacritic	88/100
OpenCritic	93% recommend

Review scores
Publication	Score
Destructoid	9/10
Electronic Gaming Monthly	5/5
Game Informer	9/10
GameSpot	9/10
GamesRadar+	5/5
IGN	9/10
Jeuxvideo.com	18/20
PCMag	5/5
VG247	5/5
IndieWire	B

Ratchet & Clank: Rift Apart received "generally favorable" reviews from critics, according to review aggregator website Metacritic. Fellow review aggregator OpenCritic assessed that the game received "mighty" approval, being recommended by 93% of critics.

IGN's Jonathon Dornbush praised the visuals of the game, saying that the animations and detailed models allowed "the entire cast to be more expressive than ever". Dornbush additionally felt the game's narrative reached the standards set by animated movies, comparing it favorably to Pixar "in its ability to tell an emotional story while also maintaining its excellent comedy."

Kyle Orland of Ars Technica enjoyed the game's combat, feeling that the core gameplay loop of shooting and dodging enemy projectiles was solid. Orland mentioned that enemy variety could have been better, but felt that enemies were used to great effect with different combinations. He criticized the gameplay usage of rifts, saying that they were underutilized for a large portion of the game.

Chris Carter of Destructoid praised the game's presentation, saying that "we're at the point of playable Pixar." Carter praised the performances of the voices cast alongside the soundtrack. He also enjoyed how the new hardware reduced loading times and felt that Rift Apart utilized the DualSense controller well.

Game Informer's Andrew Reiner particularly commended the game's visuals, and the designs of the environment, adding that "it steals your eye with its stunning vistas, makes you care about the characters". Reiner made positive comments about the Rift Tether feature, stating that its inclusion in the game elevates the gameplay experience, that quite, "often wowing you with just how different the next world is compared to the one you are currently standing in."

In a glowing review, Ryan Gilliam from Polygon wrote that Rift Apart was an impressive game that took advantage of the PlayStation 5 hardware. "But more importantly, it's a great entry in a nearly two-decade-old franchise, offering fans more wacky weapons, clever writing, and fresh biomes to explore."

GameSpot's Steve Watts gave the game a positive review, praising the outstanding game presentation, inventive weaponry and smooth controls, adding that "Ratchet & Clank: Rift Apart is flashy and technically impressive without feeling self-important."

=== Sales ===
In the United Kingdom, Ratchet & Clank: Rift Apart became the second biggest launch of the series behind the remake from 2016. Rift Apart also had the second biggest physical launch for a PlayStation 5 game behind another game developed by Insomniac, the launch title Spider-Man: Miles Morales. Sales in the United Kingdom continued to be strong in the second and third weeks of release as well. In Japan, Rift Apart was the third best-selling retail game during its first week of release behind Final Fantasy VII Remake Intergrade and Game Builder Garage, with 14,663 physical units being sold across the country. Rift Apart was also the best-selling video game in the United States during the month of its release.

Ratchet & Clank: Rift Apart had sold over 1.1 million units by July 2021. In December 2023, Insomniac Games were the victims of a ransomware attack causing private data and information to be leaked publicly. Parts of these leaks revealed that in June 2020 Rift Apart was projected to sell 2.2 million units and generate $73 million in revenue on an $81 million budget. In the same leak it was revealed that over 2.7 million copies of the game were shipped (sell-in) and turned a profit with $145 million in net sales by February 2022. Further leaks revealed that Rift Apart had sold over 3.97 million units by its second calendar year (June 2023).

=== Accolades ===
Date	Award	Category	Result	Ref(s).
November 17, 2021	Hollywood Music in Media Awards	Best Original Score — Video Game	Won	
November 23, 2021	Golden Joystick Awards	Best Visual Design	Won	
November 23, 2021	Golden Joystick Awards	Best Performer (Jennifer Hale as Rivet)	Nominated	
November 23, 2021	Golden Joystick Awards	PlayStation Game of the Year	Nominated	
November 23, 2021	Golden Joystick Awards	Ultimate Game of the Year	Nominated	
December 9, 2021	The Game Awards	Game of the Year	Nominated	
December 9, 2021	The Game Awards	Best Art Direction	Nominated	
December 9, 2021	The Game Awards	Best Audio Design	Nominated	
December 9, 2021	The Game Awards	Best Action-Adventure Game	Nominated	
December 9, 2021	The Game Awards	Best Game Direction	Nominated	
December 9, 2021	The Game Awards	Innovation in Accessibility	Nominated	
February 1, 2022	New York Game Awards	Statue of Liberty Award for Best World	Nominated	
February 1, 2022	New York Game Awards	Central Park Children's Zoo Award for Best Kids Game	Won	
February 24, 2022	D.I.C.E. Awards	Game of the Year	Nominated	
February 24, 2022	D.I.C.E. Awards	Family Game of the Year	Won	
February 24, 2022	D.I.C.E. Awards	Outstanding Achievement in Game Direction	Nominated	
February 24, 2022	D.I.C.E. Awards	Outstanding Achievement in Game Design	Nominated	
February 24, 2022	D.I.C.E. Awards	Outstanding Achievement in Animation	Won	
February 24, 2022	D.I.C.E. Awards	Outstanding Achievement in Art Direction	Won	
February 24, 2022	D.I.C.E. Awards	Outstanding Achievement in Audio Design	Nominated	
February 24, 2022	D.I.C.E. Awards	Outstanding Achievement in Character (Rivet)	Nominated	
February 24, 2022	D.I.C.E. Awards	Outstanding Technical Achievement	Won	
March 8, 2022	Visual Effects Society Awards	Outstanding Visual Effects in a Real-Time Project	Nominated	
March 12, 2022	Annie Awards	Outstanding Achievement for Character Animation in a Video Game	Won	
March 12, 2022	SXSW Gaming Awards 2022	Video Game of the Year	Nominated	
March 12, 2022	SXSW Gaming Awards 2022	Excellence in Game Design	Nominated	
March 12, 2022	SXSW Gaming Awards 2022	Excellence in Technical Achievement	Won	
March 23, 2022	Game Developers Choice Awards	Best Visual Art	Won	
March 23, 2022	Game Developers Choice Awards	Best Technology	Won	
April 7, 2022	British Academy Games Awards	Best Game	Nominated	
April 7, 2022	British Academy Games Awards	Animation	Won	
April 7, 2022	British Academy Games Awards	Artistic Achievement	Nominated	
April 7, 2022	British Academy Games Awards	Family Game	Nominated	
April 7, 2022	British Academy Games Awards	Game Design	Nominated	
April 7, 2022	British Academy Games Awards	Music	Nominated	
April 7, 2022	British Academy Games Awards	Technical Achievement	Won	
April 7, 2022	British Academy Games Awards	Performer in a Leading Role (Jennifer Hale as Rivet)	Nominated	
November 27, 2022	British Academy Children's Awards	Game	Nominated	
