= Before Your Eyes =

2021 video game

- Developer: GoodbyeWorld Games
- Publisher: Skybound Games (Note: Android and iOS ports were published by Netflix Games.)
- Directors: Will Hellwarth; Graham Parkes; Oliver Lewin
- Producer: Jake Sally
- Designers: Bela Messex; Dillon Terry
- Programmers: Bela Messex; Richard Beare
- Artists: Hana Lee; Brieyh'leai Simmons
- Writer: Graham Parkes
- Composers: Oliver Lewin; Dillon Terry
- Engine: Unity
- Platforms: Windows macOS; Android iOS; PlayStation VR2
- Release: Windows; 8 April 2021 macOS; 28 September 2021; Android, iOS; 26 July 2022; PlayStation VR2; 10 March 2023
- Genre: Adventure game
- Mode: Single-player

Before Your Eyes is a 2021 adventure game developed by GoodbyeWorld Games and published by Skybound Games. It was released on Microsoft Windows on 8 April 2021, followed by a port for macOS in September of the same year. Ports for Android and iOS were released in July 2022. The game is noted for its use of eye-tracking technology in its story telling, being a full imagining of the team's previous project Close Your, which was funded through a Kickstarter campaign.

The game follows the story of the recently deceased Benjamin Brynn on his way to the afterlife. The player must interact with Brynn's memories through an eye-tracking webcam to progress, as the game reads and responds to the player's eye movement and blinking. The game's narrative was well received by critics; However, the functionality of its eye-tracking feature received criticism.

== Gameplay ==
The player controls the recently deceased Benjamin Brynn on his way to the afterlife. The player must interact with Brynn's memories through eye-tracking technology to progress through the game. The player's eye movements and blinking is registered by the game, as blinking is the player's main way of interacting with the game, including moving time forward an indeterminate amount of time in Brynn's life. This narrative structure was inspired by the 1949 stage play Death of a Salesman, which portrays the story partly through the protagonist's memories. The player can instead opt to play with a mouse instead of a webcam, as clicking will perform the same actions as blinking.

== Plot ==
Benjamin "Benny" Brynn floats on a dark sea, before being picked up by a boat helmed by the Ferryman. Benny is unable to speak or gesture, though the Ferryman is able to perceive his blinking, which becomes his primary mode of communication. The Ferryman explains that he senses something unique in Benny, and is bringing him to the Gatekeeper for judgement. If deemed worthy, Benny will be allowed to enter the Gatekeeper's paradise and the Ferryman will be rewarded; if not, Benny will be turned into one of the seagulls that frequently crowd the boat. To facilitate this, the Ferryman asks him to recount his memories so that he may be able to spin a tale for the Gatekeeper. However, he explains that Benny will be unable to stay within the memories, as they will flash forward as soon as he blinks.

Benny then begins to recount his childhood growing up in a small, seaside town with his parents: Richard, a professor, and Elle, an accountant and aspiring composer. The family also begin caring for a stray cat they name Ernie. As he grows up, Benny develops a fondness for art, and especially music, due to his mother's influence. One day, an unsupervised Benny begins playing Elle's composition on the piano by ear, and believing him to be a prodigy, his parents quickly decide to enroll him in piano lessons. Over the years, Benny continues to improve his piano skills, impressing his parents and their friends; he also meets and befriends Chloe, his outspoken, adventurous neighbor.

Eventually, Elle manages to set up an audition for Benny which would allow him to enter a prestigious music school, and Benny is given a year to practice several pieces for his audition. As Elle intensifies their practice sessions, Richard voices his concerns about Benny, leading to several arguments about his future. On the night before the audition, Chloe invites Benny to camp with her on the beach, and he can either accept or reject her to focus on his audition. The next day, Benny plays the piece he had been practicing, but is rejected by the school regardless of his performance. Soon after, he is taken to a doctor due to an unspecified illness.

Although the illness leaves Benny unable to leave the house, he eventually rediscovers his passion for art and develops his skills, allowing him to get into art school. Benny's unique style eventually garners him widespread attention over the years, and he becomes a successful artist. However, when Elle suddenly dies, Benny falls into a slump and isolates himself from the world, only able to paint variations of his mother's final portrait. When Richard calls Benny and asks him to help clear some of Elle's belongings, Benny finds her old sheet music, which revitalizes his artistic drive and allows him to paint a new portrait of his mother which he displays at his latest exhibition. There, Benny runs into an adult Chloe, and she invites him out for a drink.

As the Ferryman celebrates at the prospect of having such a colorful story to tell, the seagulls, actually the souls of liars, see through Benny's lies and become increasingly rowdy. The Ferryman realizes this as well, and after silencing the birds, threatens Benny with the consequences of lying to the Gatekeeper, and insists on the truth. Benny then revisits his childhood once more, and the Ferryman analyzes his memory during his visit to the doctor and finally uncovers the truth: the adolescent Benny was diagnosed with a terminal illness, and did not have much longer left to live; the memories he shared about being an artist were merely Benny's fantasies. He then asks Benny to continue to revisit his true memories.

While bedridden, Benny takes up writing on his mother's old typewriter, and types out his life story at her insistence. Eventually, the disease takes its toll on Benny, and he is forced to take medication, in addition to other medical devices to mitigate the effects of the disease. As Benny's condition worsens, Richard and Elle attempt to stay positive in spite of the stresses of their current life, while Benny makes amends with Chloe after getting mad at her for brusquely comparing his situation with her late mother's own illness. Ernie also returns after running away following the death of her kittens due to coyotes earlier. Eventually, the medication is no longer able to delay the disease, and Benny finally dies, ending up in the afterlife where the Ferryman found him.

As they reach the Gatekeeper's sanctuary, the Ferryman decides against a grandiose tale like he originally intended, and instead opts for a simple summary of Benny's life by repeating Elle's response to Benny's life story: although he lived only a short and ordinary life, he nonetheless lived a good one by giving hope to his friends and family. Pleased by this display of heart and sincerity, the Gatekeeper allows Benny to pass through, as the Ferryman asks him to close his eyes one last time.

== Development ==
The idea for the game was originally conceived of in 2014 in an intro to game development class at the University of Southern California, when a student assistant, Will Hellwarth, talked about his experience modifying a game to read and respond to the player's eyes using the built-in camera. Two students attending the lesson would then team up with Hellwarth to develop a project surrounding this idea. After two months of development, the team released the project Close Your, which they would present at IndieCade. The game went on to win the Developer's Choice award at the show. The game was later exhibited at the Independent Games Festival at GDC in 2015, where it won the award for Best Student Game.

After the success of their exhibitions of Close Your, the team decided to start a Kickstarter to fund the project in 2016. The project was successfully funded, and was originally slated for a 2017 release date, though the team struggled with sporadic development until 2018, when they received funding from RYOT.

The game, rebranded as Before Your Eyes, was released on 8 April 2021 on Microsoft Windows via Steam and the Epic Games Store. A port for macOS was released on 28 September 2021 via Steam. Ports published by Netflix Games were released for Android and iOS on 26 July 2022.

== Reception ==
Reception

Aggregate scores
Aggregator	Score
Metacritic	77/100
OpenCritic	79%

Review scores
Publication	Score
Edge	5/10
Eurogamer	7/10
Game Informer	8.5/10
GameSpot	8/10
Push Square	8/10
Gamer.nl	8/10
Screen Rant	4/5

Before Your Eyes generally received positive reviews from critics, especially the story, though the controls were often noted as inconsistent. It received "generally favorable reviews" according to review aggregator Metacritic.

The story of the game received praise. Andrew King of GameSpot called it "moving", explaining that its thesis has a "beautiful defense". He described the vocal performances as "powerful" and that they "help the game reach new emotional depths". Marcus Stewart of Game Informer commended the game's writing as "earnest and thoughtful", and was surprised by his investment in the cast over the short course of the game. Ben Kuchera of Polygon was initially skeptical to the story's quality, but described the themes of the story as "both crushing and freeing". Nathan Hughes of Washington Square News noted its "simple but powerful" nature. Caspar von Au of Bayerischer Rundfunk commended the game for its ability to "tell a moving parable on life and death in a little more than 90 minutes". Jacco Peek of Gamer.nl praised the game as leaving a "deep impression" despite describing frustration from missing important moments. Scott Baird of Screen Rant praised it highly, calling it "phenomenal", as it "manag[es] to switch from joyful to heartbreaking in a moment".

The gameplay received praise from critics for how it complemented the story, though some were critical of its simplicity. Andrew King of GameSpot described the blinking mechanic as "refreshingly natural", noting that you wouldn't want to play the game in any other way. Marcus Stewart of Game Informer stated that the blinking "lends to the game's dreamlike quality" and compared it to looking through a View-Master. Ben Kuchera of Polygon noted the experience of losing track of his eyes as "bittersweet", and commended the game's use of the player's eyes as a "clever way to add meaning to an action that amounts to a mouse click".

The controls of the game received mixed responses, as the functionality of the game's ability to read inputs was noted as inconsistent. Scott Baird of Screen Rant was highly critical of the control scheme, calling it the largest issue with the game, remarking the need for constant calibrations, comparing it to the Wiimote in The Legend of Zelda: Skyward Sword.

Before Your Eyes won the "British Academy Games Award for Game Beyond Entertainment 2021" and was nominated for the "Games for Impact" category at The Game Awards 2021. It was also nominated for "Outstanding Achievement in Story" at the 25th Annual D.I.C.E. Awards.
