= Death's Door (video game) =

2021 video game

- Developer: Acid Nerve
- Publisher: Devolver Digital
- Producer: David Fenn
- Designers: David Fenn; Mark Foster
- Programmer: Mark Foster
- Artists: Frits Olsen; Mark Foster
- Writers: Mark Foster; Graham Goring
- Composer: David Fenn
- Engine: Unity
- Platforms: Windows; Xbox One; Xbox Series X/S; Nintendo Switch; PlayStation 4; PlayStation 5; Android; iOS
- Release: Windows, Xbox One, X/S; July 20, 2021; Switch, PS4, PS5; November 23, 2021; iOS, Android; December 4, 2023
- Genre: Action-adventure
- Mode: Single-player

Death's Door is a 2021 action-adventure game developed by Acid Nerve and published by Devolver Digital. It was released for Microsoft Windows, Xbox One and Xbox Series X/S on July 20, 2021, and for the Nintendo Switch, PlayStation 4 and PlayStation 5 on November 23, 2021. Ports for Android and iOS were released on December 4, 2023, for Netflix subscribers.

It received positive reviews upon release, with several publications praising its mechanics, simplicity, and difficulty level, likening it to The Legend of Zelda and Dark Souls games. It is also a sequel to Titan Souls.

== Gameplay ==
Death's Door is played from an isometric perspective.

Death's Door is a 3D, isometric action-adventure game. The player starts with a sword, and bow and arrow. Sword strikes string together into combos and ammo for the bow is replenished by using the sword. Four other weapons and three magic projectiles become available as the game progresses, but the basic attack mechanics remain.

At the start, the player has four health points (six in the mobile version), with all damage causing one to be depleted. Health is recovered by collecting and planting seeds in pots which appear throughout the world. The seeds grow into plants which restore full health and eventually regrow. Doors to and from the afterlife area exist as checkpoints throughout the game. When the player dies, they respawn at the nearest door without otherwise losing progress.

As with other Zelda-like games, new items and abilities allow access to new areas in previously explored levels, and solving puzzles with available tools is required to complete dungeons. The game uses souls as a currency, collected by killing enemies and finding secret pick-ups, which can be used to upgrade basic abilities.

== Synopsis ==
The player takes on the role of a small crow who works as a "reaper" collecting souls for the Reaping Commission Headquarters, an office-like bureaucratic afterlife. For the first mission of the game, the character is sent to collect the soul of a monster who does not want to leave life willingly. After defeating it, a large, old crow intervenes and steals the soul before telling him of a potential conspiracy regarding the disappearance of other crows. The old crow explains that the player must make their way through three dungeons in order to collect three "Giant Souls" needed to open Death's Door.

Throughout the game, more information is revealed about the Reaping Commission's background and leader, the Lord of Doors. Using an array of weapons, projectiles, magic, and dodging, the player travels through several areas, all of which link back to Headquarters via a door, defeating three bosses to collect Giant Souls. Upon unlocking the door, the player learns that the bureaucracy was created when Death entered into an arrangement with the first Lord of Doors to process souls on Death's behalf in exchange for extending the life of the Lord of Doors until they appoint a successor. Instead of appointing a successor and accepting the end of their life, the current Lord instead imprisoned Death behind the door in order to gain immortality. The final boss fight is with the Lord of Doors, after which the bureaucracy is dismantled.

After the credits, the player can switch to night mode and solve puzzles in each of the levels to collect Tablets of Knowledge which unlock the true ending, revealing the crows were acting on the will of the entity known as Truth.

== Development ==
Death's Door was developed by Acid Nerve, a Manchester, United Kingdom-based two-person studio comprising Mark Foster and David Fenn. Foster is credited as programmer, designer, writer, and animator; Fenn was producer, designer, composer, and sound designer. They also worked with two concept artists and a modeler. The developers wanted to use ideas and themes from their previous game, Titan Souls, and create a more advanced, polished game. They drew inspiration from The Legend of Zelda, Dark Souls, and the work of Japanese animation studio Studio Ghibli.

The game was about half-way complete at the beginning of the COVID-19 pandemic, which required they move to remote work and leave their new office, but it otherwise did not have a significant negative impact on development.

== Release ==
Death's Door was published by Devolver Digital. It was released for Microsoft Windows, Xbox One and Xbox Series X/S in July 2021, selling more than 100,000 copies in its first week. The game released for the Nintendo Switch, PlayStation 4 and PlayStation 5 in November 2021.

== Reception ==
Reception

Aggregate scores
Aggregator	Score
Metacritic	PC: 85/100; XONE: 87/100; XSXS: 87/100; NS: 89/100
OpenCritic	99% recommend

Review scores
Publication	Score
Destructoid	9/10
Game Informer	9/10
GameSpot	8/10
IGN	9/10
PC Gamer (US)	83/100
RPGFan	85/100

Death's Door received "generally favorable" reviews according to the review aggregator Metacritic. Fellow review aggregator OpenCritic assessed that the game received "mighty" approval, being recommended by 99% of critics. Multiple reviewers likened its aesthetics to the Dark Souls games, but with a markedly lighter tone and gentler learning curve.

GameSpot's Alessandro Barbosa wrote that it "doesn't take itself too seriously, but it always finds interesting ways to make a point about the unending cycle of life and death, the pursuit of a means to unbalance that cycle, and ultimately the consequences of those actions." It has been called a difficult game, but not punishing or sadistic. Its mechanics drew comparisons to the top-down Legend of Zelda games. Reviewers praised the game's relative simplicity, relying on tight mechanics common to the genre and a short overall playtime.

PC Gamer's Luke Winkie criticized aspects of the level design, which necessitate more backtracking than should be required, but with an overall positive review: "It's as if a grand entry to an overarching canon—filled with quirks, humor, and wondrous attention to detail—was miraculously miniaturized to fit into a fortnight's worth of lunch breaks." In a positive review, Brendan Graeber wrote in IGN that it "expertly blends classic dungeon puzzle solving with fast-paced combat encounters to create a memorable adventure across a moody world brimming with secret paths and hidden rewards." Kotaku praised the developers' attention to detail and execution on the fundamentals of game design. Destructoid similarly said that while not the most original game, it does everything it sets out to do very well. Fenn also received praise for his compositions and sound design.

The game won the award for "Best Game Feel" at the INDIE Live Expo Winter 2021 Awards, whereas its other nomination was for "Best New Characters". It also won the award for "Best Indie Game" at the 2021 Golden Joystick Awards, and was nominated for "Best Indie" at The Game Awards 2021, and for IGN's "Best Action Game of 2021" award, which went to Marvel's Guardians of the Galaxy. It was also nominated for the Off-Broadway Award for Best Indie Game at the New York Videogame Critics Circle's 11th Annual New York Game Awards, which went to Sable; for "Adventure Game of the Year" and "Outstanding Achievement for an Independent Game" at the 25th Annual D.I.C.E. Awards, which went to Marvel's Guardians of the Galaxy and Unpacking, respectively; for "Outstanding Game, Original Adventure" at the 21st annual NAVGTR Awards, which went to The Medium; for "Indie Game of the Year" at the SXSW Gaming Awards, which went to Kena: Bridge of Spirits; and for "British Game" and "Original Property" at the 18th British Academy Games Awards, which went to Forza Horizon 5 and It Takes Two, respectively. The game won the award for "Narrative Innovation of the Year" at the 2022 MCV/Develop Awards, and was nominated for the "Action and Adventure Game" and "Visual Design" awards at The Independent Game Developers' Association Games Industry Awards 2022, both of which went to Horizon Forbidden West and OlliOlli World.
