= Game Developers Choice Awards =

Annual award for games and developers

- Previous: 26th Game Developers Choice Awards
- Awarded for: Outstanding game developers and games
- Presented by: Game Developers Conference
- First award: March 24, 2001; 25 years ago
- Website: Official website

The Game Developers Choice Awards are awards annually presented at the Game Developers Conference for outstanding game developers and games. Introduced in 2001, the Game Developers Choice Awards were preceded by the Spotlight Awards, which were presented from 1997 to 1999. Since then, the ceremony for the Independent Games Festival is held just prior to the Choice Awards ceremony.

== Winner selection process ==
Nominations for games are made by International Choice Awards Network (ICAN), a group of leading game creators. Votes are then additionally made by editors of Game Developer. Any video game released in the preceding calendar year, regardless of medium, is eligible to be nominated, though upgrades, expansions, and mission packs are not eligible to be nominated.

The top nominated games are assembled into the list of nominees, typically presented in December, are then voted on by final voting body, made up of ICANs, and editors of Game Developer. In this final stage of voting, games with the highest votes in a category are the winners.

Winners for Special Awards (Lifetime Achievement, Pioneer, Ambassador) are decided by a "Special Awards Jury", which appears to consist of a variety of 5 people. This group may consider recommendations from ICAN members.

The winners are announced during the Game Developers Conference, which is typically held in March of the calendar year.

GDC related properties are owned by the UBM technology group.

=== Historical process ===
In 2007, gamasutra.com took over management of the awards from the IGDA. An advisory board selected by the editors of gamasutra.com and Game Developer magazine oversees the selection process.

In the past, nominations are accepted from registered gamasutra.com users, confirmed to be game developers, and from the advisory board. Once the nomination process is complete, the advisory board identifies five finalists for each regular category.

The recipients of the Lifetime Achievement, Pioneer (formerly known as First Penguin) and Maverick awards are selected by the advisory board. For the other awards, a vote open to all those who participated in the nomination process chooses a recipient from each category's finalists.

== List of winners ==
Note: Events held for awards are held early in the following year. Winners are listed first and highlighted in bold.

=== Game of the Year ===
The Game of the Year Award recognizes the overall best game released during the previous calendar year, as interpreted by the members of the Game Developers Conference.

Year	Game	Genre	Developer(s)
2000	The Sims	Life simulation	Maxis
2001	Grand Theft Auto III	Action-adventure	DMA Design
2002	Metroid Prime	Action-adventure	Retro Studios
2003	Star Wars: Knights of the Old Republic	Role-playing	BioWare
2004	Half-Life 2	First-person shooter	Valve
2005	Shadow of the Colossus	Action-adventure	Team Ico
2006	Gears of War	Third-person shooter	Epic Games
2007	Portal	Puzzle-platformer	Valve
2008	Fallout 3	Action role-playing	Bethesda Game Studios
2009	Uncharted 2: Among Thieves	Action-adventure	Naughty Dog
2010	Red Dead Redemption	Action-adventure	Rockstar San Diego
2011	The Elder Scrolls V: Skyrim	Action role-playing	Bethesda Game Studios
2012	Journey	Adventure	Thatgamecompany
2013	The Last of Us	Action-adventure	Naughty Dog
2014	Middle-earth: Shadow of Mordor	Action-adventure	Monolith Productions
2015	The Witcher 3: Wild Hunt	Action role-playing	CD Projekt Red
2016	Overwatch	First-person shooter	Blizzard Entertainment
2017	The Legend of Zelda: Breath of the Wild	Adventure	Nintendo
2018	God of War	Action-adventure	Santa Monica Studio
2019	Untitled Goose Game	Puzzle	House House
2020	Hades	Action role-playing	Supergiant Games
2021	Inscryption	Roguelike Deck-Builder	Daniel Mullins Games
2022	Elden Ring	Action role-playing	FromSoftware
2023	Baldur's Gate 3	Role-playing	Larian Studios
2024	Balatro	Roguelike Deck-Builder	LocalThunk
2025	Clair Obscur: Expedition 33	Role-playing	Sandfall Interactive / Kepler Interactive

=== Best Audio ===
Best Audio award recognizes the overall excellence of audio in a game, including sound effects, musical composition, sound design and orchestration.

- 2000: Diablo II
- 2001: Halo: Combat Evolved
- 2002: Medal of Honor: Allied Assault
- 2003: Call of Duty
- 2004: Halo 2
- 2005: Guitar Hero
- 2006: Guitar Hero II
- 2007: BioShock
- 2008: Dead Space
- 2009: Uncharted 2: Among Thieves
- 2010: Red Dead Redemption
- 2011: Portal 2
- 2012: Journey
- 2013: BioShock Infinite
- 2014: Alien: Isolation
- 2015: Crypt of the NecroDancer
- 2016: Inside
- 2017: The Legend of Zelda: Breath of the Wild
- 2018: Celeste
- 2019: Control
- 2020: Hades
- 2021: Unpacking
- 2022: God of War Ragnarök
- 2023: Hi-Fi Rush
- 2024: Astro Bot
- 2025: Clair Obscur: Expedition 33

=== Best Debut ===
The Best Debut Award recognizes the best game from any development studio which released its first publicly available title during the calendar year. This was formerly known as the New Studio of the Year Award. In years prior to 2008, the award was awarded to the studio name, as opposed to the game title.

- 2000: Valve / Minh Le / Jess Cliffe (for Counter-Strike)
- 2001: Bohemia Interactive (for Operation Flashpoint: Cold War Crisis)
- 2002: Retro Studios (for Metroid Prime)
- 2003: Infinity Ward (for Call of Duty)
- 2004: Crytek (for Far Cry)
- 2005: Double Fine Productions (for Psychonauts)
- 2006: Iron Lore Entertainment (for Titan Quest)
- 2007: Realtime Worlds / Microsoft Game Studios (for Crackdown)
- 2008: Media Molecule (for LittleBigPlanet)
- 2009: Runic Games (for Torchlight)
- 2010: Mojang (for Minecraft)
- 2011: Supergiant Games (for Bastion)
- 2012: Subset Games (for FTL: Faster Than Light)
- 2013: The Fullbright Company (for Gone Home)
- 2014: Stoic (for The Banner Saga)
- 2015: Moon Studios (for Ori and the Blind Forest)
- 2016: Campo Santo (for Firewatch)
- 2017: Studio MDHR (for Cuphead)
- 2018: Mountains (for Florence)
- 2019: ZA/UM (for Disco Elysium)
- 2020: Kinetic Games (for Phasmophobia)
- 2021: Iron Gate Studio (for Valheim)
- 2022: BlueTwelve Studio (for Stray)
- 2023: Visai Games (for Venba)
- 2024: PlayThunk (for Balatro)
- 2025: Clair Obscur: Expedition 33 by Sandfall Interactive

=== Best Design ===
Best Design award recognizes the overall excellence of design in a game, including gameplay, mechanics, puzzles, play balancing, and scenarios.

- 2000: Deus Ex
- 2001: Grand Theft Auto III
- 2002: Battlefield 1942
- 2003: Prince of Persia: The Sands of Time
- 2004: Katamari Damacy
- 2005: Shadow of the Colossus
- 2006: Wii Sports
- 2007: Portal
- 2008: LittleBigPlanet
- 2009: Batman: Arkham Asylum
- 2010: Red Dead Redemption
- 2011: Portal 2
- 2012: Journey
- 2013: The Last of Us
- 2014: Hearthstone: Heroes of Warcraft
- 2015: Rocket League
- 2016: Overwatch
- 2017: The Legend of Zelda: Breath of the Wild
- 2018: Into the Breach
- 2019: Baba Is You
- 2020: Hades
- 2021: It Takes Two
- 2022: Elden Ring
- 2023: Baldur's Gate 3
- 2024: Balatro
- 2025: Blue Prince

=== Best Mobile/Handheld Game ===
Best Mobile/Handheld Game Award recognizes the overall best game commercially released on any handheld platform.

- 2007: The Legend of Zelda: Phantom Hourglass
- 2008: God of War: Chains of Olympus
- 2009: Scribblenauts
- 2010: Cut the Rope
- 2011: Superbrothers: Sword & Sworcery EP
- 2012: The Room
- 2013: The Legend of Zelda: A Link Between Worlds
- 2014: Monument Valley
- 2015: Her Story
- 2016: Pokémon Go
- 2017: Gorogoa
- 2018: Florence
- 2019: What the Golf?
- 2020: Genshin Impact

=== Innovation Award ===
The Innovation Award recognizes games that demonstrate innovation and push the boundaries of games as an expressive medium. Multiple awards per year were given before 2007.

- 2000: Counter-Strike; Crazy Taxi; Deus Ex; Jet Grind Radio; No One Lives Forever
- 2001: Black and White; Grand Theft Auto III; ICO; Majestic; Rez
- 2002: Animal Crossing; Battlefield 1942; Medal of Honor: Allied Assault; The Thing
- 2003: EyeToy: Play; Viewtiful Joe; WarioWare, Inc.: Mega Microgame$!
- 2004: Donkey Konga; I Love Bees; Katamari Damacy
- 2005: Nintendogs; Guitar Hero
- 2006: Line Rider; Ōkami; Wii Sports
- 2007: Portal
- 2008: LittleBigPlanet
- 2009: Scribblenauts
- 2010: Minecraft
- 2011: Johann Sebastian Joust
- 2012: Journey
- 2013: Papers, Please
- 2014: Monument Valley
- 2015: Her Story
- 2016: No Man's Sky
- 2017: Gorogoa
- 2018: Nintendo Labo
- 2019: Baba Is You
- 2020: Dreams
- 2021: Unpacking
- 2022: Immortality
- 2023: The Legend of Zelda: Tears of the Kingdom
- 2024: Balatro
- 2025: Blue Prince

=== Social Impact ===
Recognition for a game that advances equality, justice, intersectionality and/or sustainability, and works to positively impact the lives of its players in a meaningful way.

- 2025: Consume Me (Jenny Jiao Hsia)

=== Best Narrative ===
Best Narrative award recognizes the quality of writing in a game, including story, plot construction, dialogue, and branching narratives.

- 2002: Tom Clancy's Splinter Cell
- 2003: Star Wars: Knights of the Old Republic
- 2004: Half-Life 2
- 2005: Psychonauts
- 2006: The Legend of Zelda: Twilight Princess
- 2007: BioShock
- 2008: Fallout 3
- 2009: Uncharted 2: Among Thieves
- 2010: Mass Effect 2
- 2011: Portal 2
- 2012: The Walking Dead
- 2013: The Last of Us
- 2014: Kentucky Route Zero: Episode 3
- 2015: Her Story
- 2016: Firewatch
- 2017: What Remains of Edith Finch
- 2018: Return of the Obra Dinn
- 2019: Disco Elysium
- 2020: The Last of Us Part II
- 2021: Psychonauts 2
- 2022: Pentiment
- 2023: Baldur's Gate 3
- 2024: Metaphor: ReFantazio
- 2025: Clair Obscur: Expedition 33

=== Best Technology ===
Best Technology award recognizes the overall excellence of technology in a game, including graphics programming, artificial intelligence, networking, and physics.

- 2004: Half-Life 2
- 2005: Nintendogs
- 2006: Gears of War
- 2007: Crysis
- 2008: LittleBigPlanet
- 2009: Uncharted 2: Among Thieves
- 2010: Red Dead Redemption
- 2011: Battlefield 3
- 2012: Far Cry 3
- 2013: Grand Theft Auto V
- 2014: Destiny
- 2015: The Witcher 3: Wild Hunt
- 2016: Uncharted 4: A Thief's End
- 2017: Horizon Zero Dawn
- 2018: Red Dead Redemption 2
- 2019: Control
- 2020: Microsoft Flight Simulator
- 2021: Ratchet & Clank: Rift Apart
- 2022: God of War Ragnarök
- 2023: The Legend of Zelda: Tears of the Kingdom
- 2024: Astro Bot
- 2025: Death Stranding 2: On the Beach

=== Best Visual Art ===
Best Visual Art award recognizes the overall excellence of visual art in a game, including animation, modeling, art direction, and textures.

- 2000: Jet Grind Radio
- 2001: ICO
- 2002: Kingdom Hearts
- 2003: The Legend of Zelda: The Wind Waker
- 2004: World of Warcraft
- 2005: Shadow of the Colossus
- 2006: Gears of War
- 2007: BioShock
- 2008: Prince of Persia
- 2009: Uncharted 2: Among Thieves
- 2010: Limbo
- 2011: Uncharted 3: Drake's Deception
- 2012: Journey
- 2013: BioShock Infinite
- 2014: Monument Valley
- 2015: Ori and the Blind Forest
- 2016: Inside
- 2017: Cuphead
- 2018: Gris
- 2019: Control
- 2020: Ghost of Tsushima
- 2021: Ratchet & Clank: Rift Apart
- 2022: Elden Ring
- 2023: Alan Wake 2
- 2024: Black Myth: Wukong
- 2025: Clair Obscur: Expedition 33

=== Best VR/AR Game ===
- 2016: Job Simulator: The 2050 Archives
- 2017: Superhot VR
- 2018: Beat Saber
- 2019: Vader Immortal
- 2020: Half-Life: Alyx

== Special Awards Recipients ==
=== Audience Award ===
These awards are voted by the audience for best game of that year.

- 2012: Dishonored
- 2013: Kerbal Space Program
- 2014: Elite Dangerous
- 2015: Life Is Strange
- 2016: Battlefield 1
- 2017: Nier: Automata
- 2018: Beat Saber
- 2019: Sky: Children of the Light
- 2020: Ghost of Tsushima
- 2021: Valheim
- 2022: God of War Ragnarök
- 2023: Baldur's Gate 3
- 2024: Final Fantasy VII Rebirth
- 2025: And Roger

=== The Pioneer Award ===
Known as the First Penguin award until 2007, the Pioneer Award celebrates individuals who developed a breakthrough technology, game concept or gameplay design.

- 2000: Chip Morningstar and Randy Farmer, creators of LucasArts's Habitat
- 2001: Hubert Chardot, "for his risk-taking work on Alone in the Dark"
- 2002: David Crane, Larry Kaplan, Jim Levy, Alan Miller, Bob Whitehead, founders of Activision
- 2003: Masaya Matsuura, founder of NanaOn-Sha, pioneer of music/game integration
- 2004: Richard Bartle, co-creator of MUD, ancestor to MMOs
- 2005: Don Woods, Will Crowther, creators of the early text game Colossal Cave Adventure
- 2006: Alexey Pajitnov, creator of Tetris
- 2007: Ralph Baer, inventor of the Magnavox Odyssey
- 2008: Alex Rigopulos and Eran Egozy, founders of Harmonix
- 2009: Gabe Newell, co-founder of Valve
- 2010: Yu Suzuki, lead of Sega AM2 development team responsible for several arcade games and the Shenmue series
- 2011: Dave Theurer, developer of Missile Command and Tempest
- 2012: Steve Russell, creator of Spacewar!
- 2013: Brandon Beck and Marc Merrill, creators of Riot Games
- 2014: David Braben, founder of Frontier Developments, co-creator of the Elite series
- 2015: Markus "Notch" Persson, creator of Minecraft
- 2016: Jordan Mechner, creator of Prince of Persia
- 2017: None (see below)
- 2018: Rieko Kodama, graphic artist/director/producer for several Sega titles
- 2019: Roberta Williams, co-founder of Sierra On-line and early developer of the adventure game genre
- 2020: Tom Fulp, creator of Newgrounds and co-founder of The Behemoth
- 2021: None given
- 2022: Mabel Addis, first female video game designer
- 2024: Lucas Pope, developer of Papers, Please and The Return of the Obra Dinn

GDC had announced their intention to award Nolan Bushnell (co-founder of Atari) the 2017 Pioneer Award. However, after several people asked the GDC to reconsider this in light of documented sexist activities in Bushnell's past in light of the current #MeToo movement, GDC opted to not award the Pioneer Award and instead "will dedicate this year's award to honor the pioneering and unheard voices of the past".

=== Ambassador Award ===
The Ambassador Award is given to individuals within or outside the industry who helped video games "advance to a better place." It replaced the IGDA Award for Community Contribution after 2007.

- 2007: Jason Della Rocca (former head of International Game Developers Association)
- 2008: Tommy Tallarico (video game musician and composer)
- 2009: Jerry Holkins, Mike Krahulik and Robert Khoo (creators and founders of Penny Arcade)
- 2010: Tim Brengle and Ian Mackenzie (Organizers of the Game Developers Conference volunteer program for 20+ years)
- 2011: Kenneth Doroshow and Paul M. Smith (the lawyers which argued Brown v. Entertainment Merchants Association to the US Supreme Court supporting the video game industry)
- 2012: Chris Melissinos (developer at Sun Microsystems leading gaming-related Java initiatives)
- 2013: Anita Sarkeesian (creator of Feminist Frequency)
- 2014: Brenda Romero (game developer, one of the leads of Romero Games)
- 2015: Tracy Fullerton (game developer and professor at USC Interactive Media & Games Division)
- 2016: Mark DeLoura (former editor of Game Developer and served as Senior Advisor for Digital Media for the U.S. Office of Science and Technology Policy)
- 2017: Rami Ismail (co-founder of Vlambeer, assistance to indie game development)
- 2018: None given
- 2019: Kate Edwards (former head of the International Game Developers Association)
- 2020: None given
- 2021: Steven Spohn (founder of AbleGamers)
- 2022: None given
- 2023: Fawzi Mesmar (creative director, game designer, leader, and author, known for his work in the video game industry)
- 2025: Rebecca Heineman (Trailblazer, co-founder of Interplay, a passionate advocate for diversity and inclusion.)

=== Lifetime Achievement Award ===
The Lifetime Achievement Award recognizes the achievements of a developer who has impacted games and game development.

- 2000: Will Wright (Sim games)
- 2001: Yuji Naka (Sonic the Hedgehog series)
- 2002: Gunpei Yokoi (1941–1997) (Game Boy, Super Mario Land series, Metroid series)
- 2003: Mark Cerny (Crash Bandicoot and Spyro the Dragon)
- 2004: Eugene Jarvis (Defender and Robotron: 2084)
- 2005: Richard Garriott (Ultima)
- 2006: Shigeru Miyamoto (creator of Mario, Donkey Kong, The Legend of Zelda, Star Fox, F-Zero, and Pikmin)
- 2007: Sid Meier (Civilization series and many different simulators)
- 2008: Hideo Kojima (Metal Gear series)
- 2009: John Carmack (Doom series)
- 2010: Peter Molyneux (God games)
- 2011: Warren Spector (Deus Ex, System Shock, Thief: The Dark Project)
- 2012: Ray Muzyka and Greg Zeschuk (co-founders of BioWare)
- 2013: Ken Kutaragi ("father" of the PlayStation console line)
- 2014: Hironobu Sakaguchi (Final Fantasy series)
- 2015: Todd Howard (Elder Scrolls, Fallout)
- 2016: Tim Sweeney (founder of Epic Games)
- 2017: Tim Schafer (developer for LucasArts adventure games, founder of Double Fine)
- 2018: Amy Hennig (video game writer/director, notably for the Uncharted series)
- 2020: Laralyn McWilliams, creative director of Free Realms and lead director of Full Spectrum Warrior
- 2021: Yuji Horii, creator of the Dragon Quest series
- 2022: John Romero, co-founder of id Software and Ion Storm, and co-creator of the Wolfenstein 3D, Doom, and Quake series
- 2023: Yoko Shimomura, composer of Street Fighter II and the Kingdom Hearts series
- 2024: Sam Lake, Creative Director at Remedy Entertainment
- 2025: Don Daglow, Emmy Award winning game designer with a 55-year career covering over 100 games

== Retired awards ==
The following award categories have been retired or replaced with a different focus.

=== Best Downloadable Game ===
Best Downloadable Game Award recognizes the overall best game released on console or PC platforms specifically and solely for digital download - with an emphasis on smaller, more 'casual'-friendly titles.

- 2007: flOw
- 2008: World of Goo
- 2009: Flower
- 2011: Minecraft
- 2012: Bastion
- 2013: Journey
- 2014: Papers, Please

=== Character Design ===
The Character Design award recognizes the overall excellence of non-licensed character design in a game, including originality, character arc and emotional depth.

- 2004: Half-Life 2
- 2005: Shadow of the Colossus
- 2006: Ōkami

=== Excellence in Level Design ===
- 2000: American McGee's Alice
- 2001: ICO
- 2002: Metroid Prime

=== Excellence in Programming ===
- 2000: The Sims
- 2001: Black and White
- 2002: Neverwinter Nights
- 2003: Prince of Persia: The Sands of Time

=== IGDA Award for Community Contribution ===
The IGDA Award for Community Contribution recognized developers for significant efforts "building community, sharing knowledge, speaking on behalf of developers and/or contributing to the art form of game development". The Ambassador Award replaced it after 2007.

- 2000: John Carmack
- 2001: Jeff Lander
- 2002: Doug Church (Eidos Interactive)
- 2003: Ray Muzyka and Greg Zeschuk
- 2004: Sheri Graner Ray
- 2005: Chris Hecker
- 2006: George Sanger

=== Original Game Character of the Year ===
- 2000: Seaman from Seaman
- 2001: Daxter from Jak and Daxter: The Precursor Legacy
- 2002: Sly Cooper from Sly Cooper and the Thievius Raccoonus
- 2003: HK-47 from Star Wars: Knights of the Old Republic

=== Maverick Award ===
The Maverick Award recognizes the current achievements of a developer who exhibits independence in thought and action while experimenting with alternate/emerging forms of digital games.

- 2003: Brian Fiete, Jason Kapalka, and John Vechey (PopCap Games)
- 2004: Matt Adams, Ju Row Farr, and Nick Tandavanitj (Blast Theory)
- 2005: Mike Dornbrook, Eran Egozy, Greg LoPiccolo, and Alex Rigopulos (Harmonix Music Systems)
- 2006: Greg Costikyan

=== Best New Social/Online Game ===
- 2009: FarmVille

== Game Developers Choice Online Awards ==
For its eight iteration in 2010, GDC Austin was rebranded as GDC Online, with a greater focus on MMOs, and social and casual games. The Game Developers Choice Online Awards were also introduced to recognize technical excellence and innovation in online games. In addition to the awards of the competitive categories, special awards were given out to pioneering online games and creators. In 2012 it was announced that GDC Online would be replaced by GDC Next in Los Angeles in 2013, and the awards were subsequently discontinued.

=== 2010 ===
The 2010 awards ceremony took place on October 7, 2010. League of Legends by Riot Games led the winners with five awards from six nominations, including the publicly voted Audience Award. Richard Bartle received the Online Game Legend award for his work on the first MUD and the 2003 book Designing Virtual Worlds. The massively multiplayer online role-playing game (MMORPG) Ultima Online was inducted into the GDC Online Awards Hall of Fame for being "a specific online game that has resulted in the long-term advancement of the medium, pioneering major shifts in online game development and games as a whole."

Award	Game	Publisher
Best Online Technology	League of Legends	Riot Games
Best Social Network Game	Social City	Playdom
Best Online Visual Arts	League of Legends	Riot Games
Best Audio for an Online Game	Aion	NCSoft
Best Community Relations	World of Warcraft	Blizzard Entertainment
Best Online Game Design	League of Legends	Riot Games
Best Live Game	Eve Online	CCP Games
Best New Online Game	League of Legends	Riot Games
Audience Award	League of Legends	Riot Games

Special Awards
Award	Recipient
Online Game Legend Award	Richard Bartle
GDC Online Awards Hall of Fame	Ultima Online (Electronic Arts)

=== 2011 ===
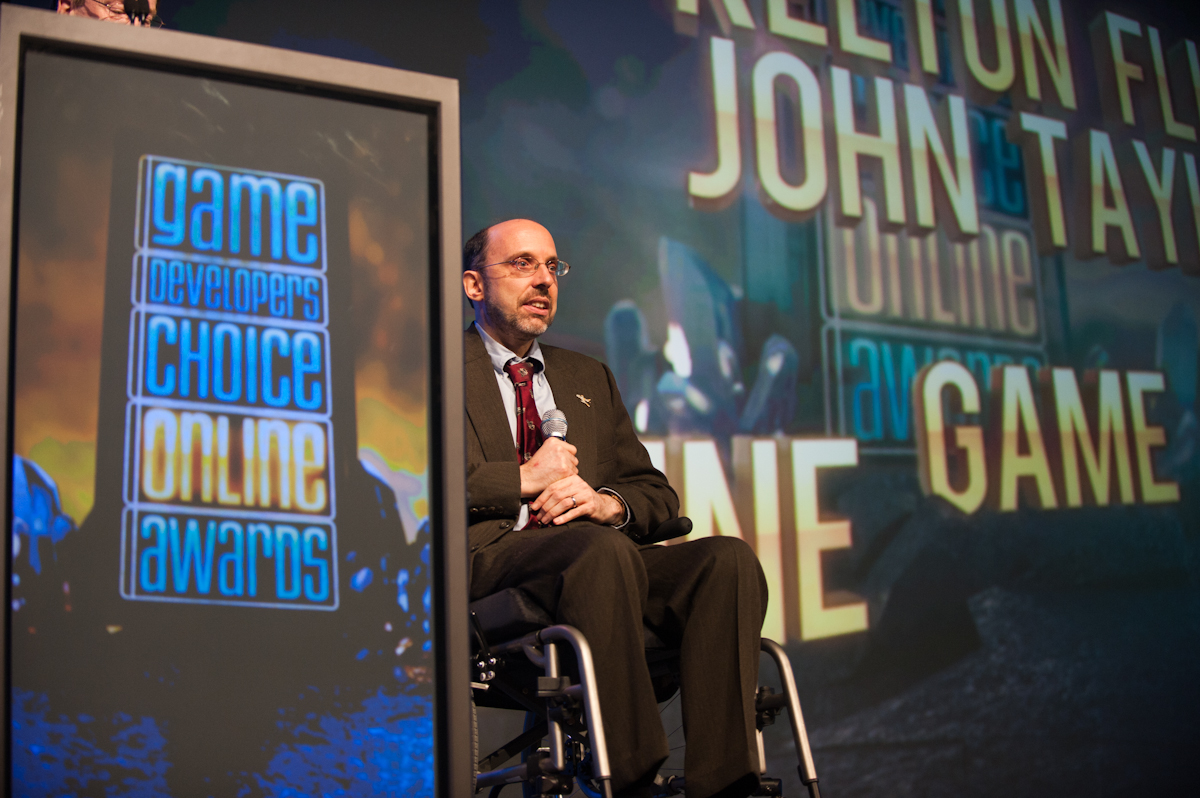
Kelton Flinn receiving the Online Game Legend Award

The 2011 awards ceremony took place on October 12, 2011. All the awards from the previous year returned, and a new award for Online Innovation was introduced. Minecraft and Rift by Mojang and Trion Worlds respectively took home the most awards, with two each. Kelton Flinn and John Taylor received the special Online Game Legend award as founders of Kesmai and creators of Island of Kesmai and Air Warrior. Additionally, the MMORPG EverQuest was inducted into the GDC Online Awards Hall of Fame.

Award	Game	Publisher
Best Online Game Design	Spiral Knights	Three Rings Design/Sega
Best Online Visual Arts	DC Universe Online	Sony Online Entertainment
Best Community Relations	Minecraft	Mojang
Best Online Technology	Rift	Trion Worlds
Best Social Network Game	Gardens of Time	Playdom
Best Audio for an Online Game	Clone Wars Adventures	Sony Online Entertainment
Best New Online Game	Rift	Trion Worlds
Best Live Game	Minecraft	Mojang
Online Innovation	Shadow Cities	Grey Area
Audience Award	Wizard101	KingsIsle Entertainment

Special Awards
Award	Recipient
Online Game Legend	Kelton Flinn and John Taylor
GDC Online Awards Hall of Fame	EverQuest (Sony Online Entertainment)

=== 2012 ===
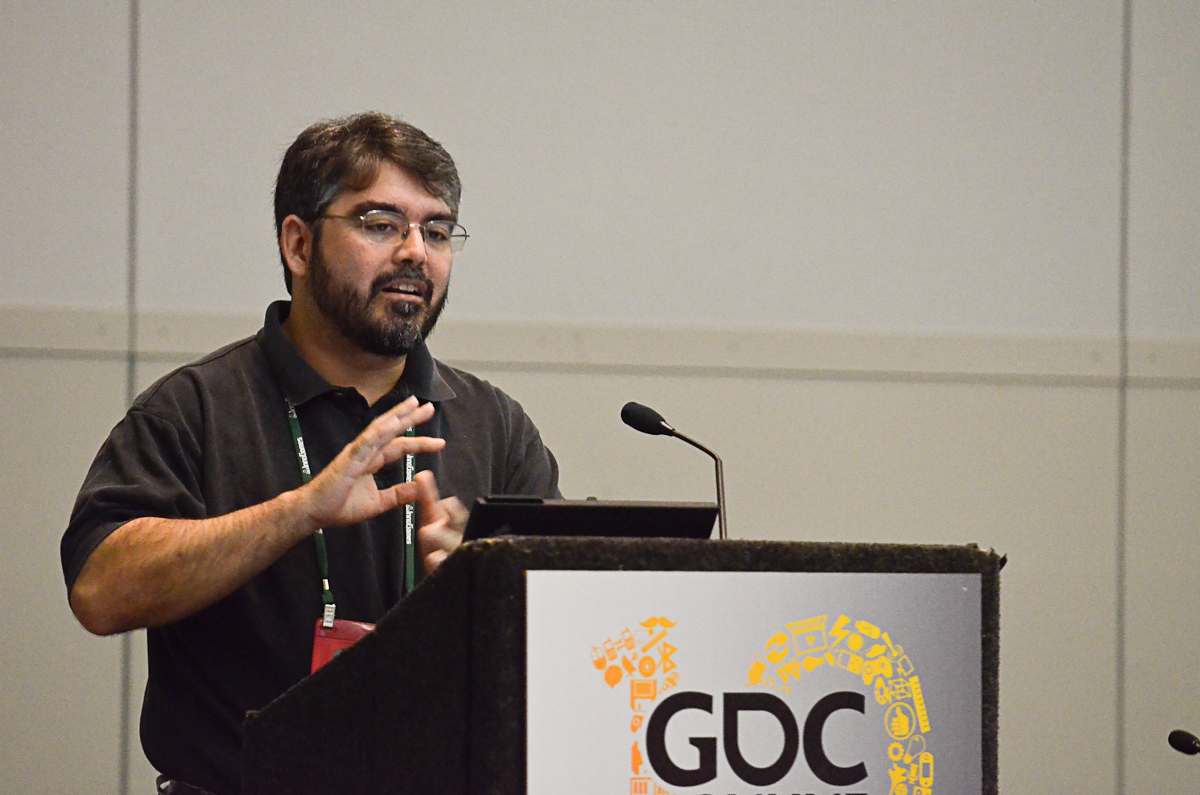
Raph Koster at GDC Online 2012

The 2011 awards ceremony took place on October 10, 2012. Star Wars: The Old Republic, developed by BioWare Austin, became the top winner at four awards, with League of Legends by Riot Games trailing slightly behind at three awards. The Online Game Legend award was given to Raph Koster, developer of previous Hall of Fame inductee Ultima Online as well as Star Wars: Galaxies. MMORPG World of Warcraft was inducted into the GDC Online Awards Hall of Fame.

Award	Game	Developer
Best Online Game Design	Star Wars: The Old Republic	BioWare Austin
Best Online Visual Arts	Star Wars: The Old Republic	BioWare Austin
Best Community Relations	League of Legends	Riot Games
Best Online Technology	Star Wars: The Old Republic	BioWare Austin
Best Social Network Game	Draw Something	OMGPOP/Zynga
Best Audio for an Online Game	Diablo III	Blizzard Entertainment
Best New Online Game	Star Wars: The Old Republic	BioWare Austin
Best Live Game	League of Legends	Riot Games
Online Innovation	Journey	Thatgamecompany
Audience Award	League of Legends	Riot Games

Special Awards
Award	Recipient
Online Game Legend	Raph Koster
GDC Online Awards Hall of Fame	World of Warcraft (Blizzard Entertainment)
