= Kena: Bridge of Spirits =

2021 video game

- Developer: Ember Lab
- Publisher: Ember Lab
- Director: Mike Grier
- Producer: Josh Grier
- Designer: Jacqueline Yee
- Writer: Josh Grier
- Composer: Jason Gallaty
- Engine: Unreal Engine 4
- Platforms: PlayStation 4; PlayStation 5; Windows; Xbox One; Xbox Series X/S; Nintendo Switch 2
- Release: PS4, PS5, Win; September 21, 2021; XONE, XSXS; August 15, 2024; Nintendo Switch 2; March 26, 2026
- Genre: Action-adventure
- Mode: Single-player

Kena: Bridge of Spirits is a 2021 action-adventure video game developed and published by Ember Lab. The story follows Kena, a young spirit guide who uses her magical abilities to help deceased people move from the physical to the spirit world. The game is presented through a third-person perspective. The player uses Kena's staff for attacking enemies, and her pulse ability for defending against attacks. They are tasked with collecting small spirit companions known as the Rot, who help to complete tasks and battle against enemies.

The game's development was led by brothers Mike and Josh Grier, founders of Ember Lab. Having spent five years creating commercials and branded applications, the development team shifted to creating an original video game after 2016. They partnered with Sony Interactive Entertainment for a console-exclusive deal, and grew the team to 15 core employees. The game's art was created in collaboration with Vietnamese animation studio Sparx, and its fictional world is inspired by Eastern locations such as Japan and Bali. The original score was composed by Jason Gallaty, who collaborated with Balinese ensemble group Gamelan Çudamani to create gamelan music respectful to the culture.

Kena: Bridge of Spirits was showcased at the Tribeca Film Festival in 2021. Following some delays, partly due to the COVID-19 pandemic, the game was released for the PlayStation 4, PlayStation 5, and Windows in September 2021, for the Xbox One and Xbox Series X/S in August 2024, and for the Nintendo Switch 2 in March 2026. It received generally positive reviews, with particular praise directed at its artistic design, original music, and the use of the Rot, though critics were divided on the gameplay, narrative, and characters. It received several awards and nominations from video game publications and awards ceremonies. A sequel, Kena: Scars of Kosmora, is scheduled to release in 2027.

== Gameplay ==
In Kena: Bridge of Spirits, the player uses Spirit Bombs to float shimmering rocks for platforming. The player's staff transforms into a bow for combat and puzzle-solving.

Kena: Bridge of Spirits is an action-adventure game played from a third-person perspective. The player controls Kena, a young spirit guide with magical abilities. In combat, the player uses Kena's staff for light, heavy, and charged attacks. An upgrade transforms the staff into a bow, which can be used to attack enemies, act as a grappling hook, or hit crystals to solve puzzles. When defending against enemies, the player can activate Kena's pulse ability, which acts as a shield and has a health meter that depletes when attacked; it serves to provide clues and activate objects, and an upgrade allows the player to dash forwards, which can be used to pass through barriers to the Spirit Realm, dodge attacks and stun enemies, and corporealize spirit enemies. Activating the pulse ability before an attack stuns the enemy. The player gains the ability to use Spirit Bombs, which can be used to float shimmering rocks for platforming or as a stun attack against enemies.

The player is tasked with collecting small spirit companions known as the Rot. They can be directed to complete tasks, such as moving objects, taking certain shapes, or distracting enemies. The player must damage enemies to collect enough courage before the Rot can join battles. Directing the Rot to complete a task during battle will expend courage, which can be regained by continuing to attack enemies and collecting the dropped courage. The Rot can infuse the player's arrows or bombs to provide a stronger attack. The Rot can be customized with different hats, which are discovered by completing tasks or opening chests; when discovered, they become available at the Rot Hat Cart, where they are purchasable using Gems earned and discovered throughout the game world. The player earns karma by completing tasks and finding collectibles, which is used to unlock upgrades and abilities such as more powerful attacks or a stronger shield. Throughout the world, the player may discover spirit mail, which is used to unlock areas within the village and free the spirits within. The player may find locations to meditate; doing so will increase their overall health meter. The game utilizes the DualSense controller's haptic feedback for features such as Kena's spirit bow.

== Plot ==
In the world of Kena: Bridge of Spirits, deceased people can remain between the physical and spirit worlds if they are traumatized or feel unfinished. The task of spirit guides is to understand their difficulties and help them to move on. In the game, a young spirit guide named Kena (Dewa Ayu Dewi Larassanti) travels to an abandoned village in search of the sacred Mountain Shrine. She collects small companions called the Rot, who help her throughout her journey. On the way to the village, she confronts a powerful masked spirit who reveals himself to be the cause of corruption in the forest, forcing it to decay and unleashing deadly monsters on the land. Kena insists she can help his spirit move on, but he refuses and leaves. In the village, Kena meets former elder Zajuro (Vlasta Vrána), who informs her she must help the trapped spirits before being granted passage to the shrine.

Kena follows the spirits of two young children, Saiya (Sam Cavallaro) and Beni (Joshua Vincent), whose older brother Taro (Tod Fennell) is a restless spirit struggling to move on. After discovering relics of Taro's memories, Kena defeats the corruption that has overtaken him. Taro tells her, after a sickness killed their parents and spread throughout the village, he took his siblings and sought help from Rusu (Alan Adelberg) but they were told to return to the village. On the journey back, Taro witnessed the explosion of the Mountain Shrine; its impact wiped out the village. As a spirit, he desperately searched for his siblings, but the corruption overwhelmed him. Kena tells Taro to forgive himself, and that his siblings need him; he embraces them, and their spirits move on.

Kena seeks to help the village's Woodsmith, Adira (Amber Goldfarb); on the way, she encounters the spirit of Adira's partner, Hana (Gita Miller). After Kena finds relics of Adira's memories, Adira tells her she and Hana had discovered how to focus the energy of the Mountain within the Village Heart, but it had started to fade. When the sickness began to spread throughout the village, Hana left to search for food and supplies, but never returned. To help Hana find her way home, Adira built a tower and put the Village Heart at the top of it; while doing so, the Mountain Shrine exploded, wiping her out. Kena tells Adira to forgive herself, and the work she built with Hana would forever be a part of the land; Adira and Hana embrace, and their spirits move on.

To reach the Mountain Shrine, Kena attempts to help the powerful masked spirit, revealed to be the former village leader Toshi (Masashi Odate), but his corruption overpowers her. Kena finds relics of Toshi's past in the spirit realm and attempts to free him of corruption, but he overpowers her again and takes control of the Rot. She confronts him atop the mountain, where he fuses the Rot with corruption to create a giant corrupted Rot monster. Kena takes back the Rot and defeats the creature. Toshi tells Kena he sought answers after the village was overcome with sickness; Zajuro told him it was the natural cycle of the Rot God and they must find a new home, but Toshi refused. He confronted the Rot God atop the Mountain to inquire about the suffering inflicted upon his people. The Rot God did not answer, provoking Toshi to kill it and causing the explosion that wiped out the village and its inhabitants. Kena tells Toshi to forgive himself, and his and Zajuro's spirits move on. Kena bids farewell to the Rot, revealed to be fragments of the Rot God. The Rot combines to restore the spirit of the Rot God while Kena meditates on the Mountain Shrine.

== Development ==
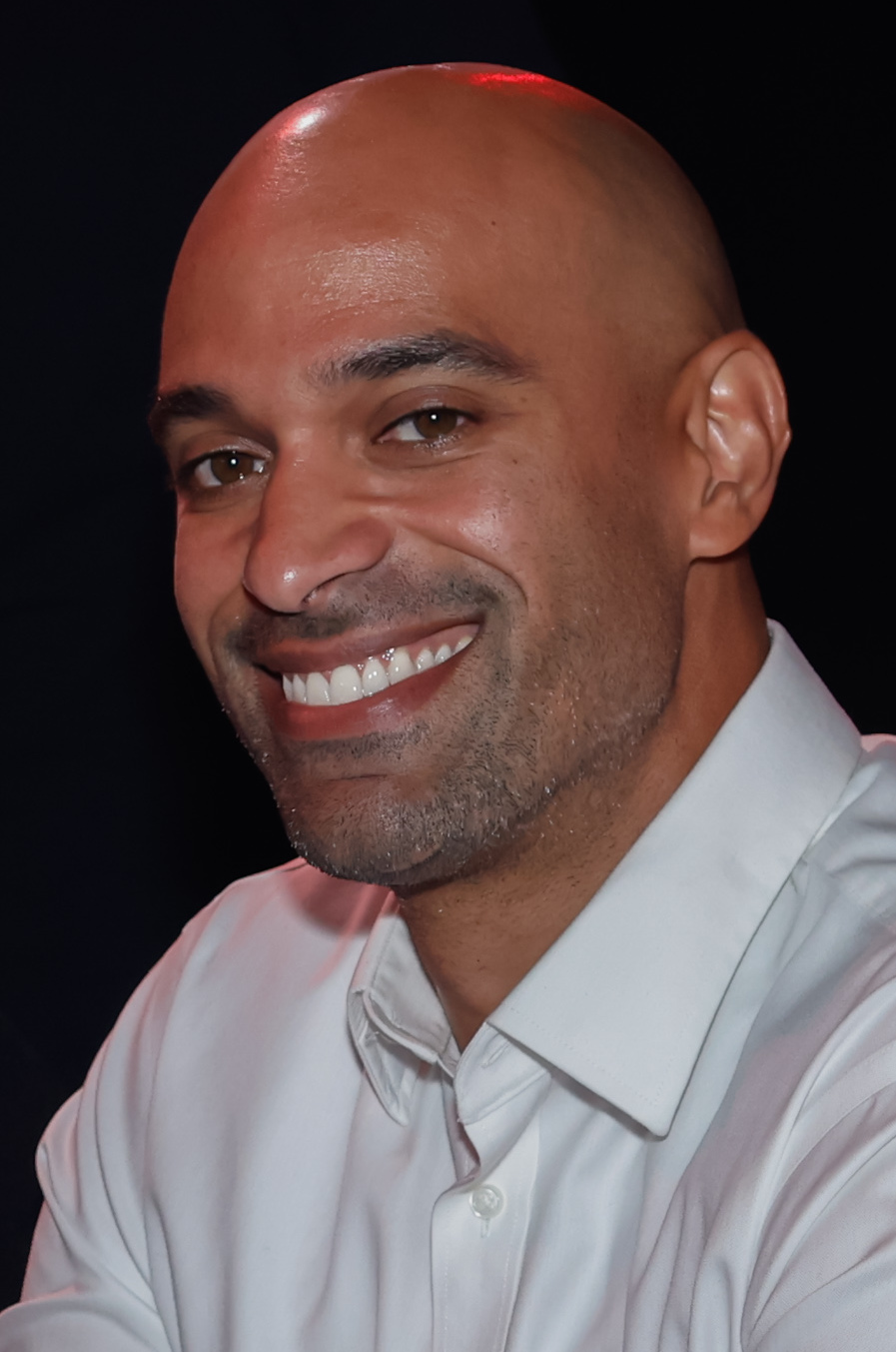
Ember Lab co-founder Josh Grier wrote and produced Kena: Bridge of Spirits.

Kena: Bridge of Spirits was developed by Ember Lab, an independent studio based in Los Angeles. Founded in 2009 by brothers Mike and Josh Grier, the studio worked on several animated commercials and branded game applications, and in 2016 released a viral short film based on The Legend of Zelda: Majora's Mask titled Terrible Fate. Following the release of Terrible Fate, the development team felt creating a video game was the "natural next step". While developing the story for Kena: Bridge of Spirits, Ember Lab considered an animated film or series; after creating the Rot, they realized a video game would be more appropriate as the creatures provided a connection between gameplay and narrative.

Along with a small team, Mike used his experience with programming to create a prototype over several years, before employing staff with more development experience. Once the prototype was complete, in March 2017 the team began pitching to potential publishing partners with assistance from industry veteran Tina Kowalewski. They found several publishers were familiar with Terrible Fate. Ember Lab signed a console-exclusive deal with Sony Interactive Entertainment in October 2017; Sony assisted with funding and marketing. The team grew to 15 core employees, with assistance outsourced to other studios. Mike Grier handled the creative elements of the studio, while Josh worked with the business and managerial side. The final game was larger in scope than originally envisioned.

In October 2020, former designer Brandon Popovich claimed Ember Lab did not fully compensate him for his work on the game and failed to honor promises made regarding equity and a promotion; an anonymous source issued similar claims, accusing the company of unpaid overtime and unfulfilled promises of a full-time position. Ember Lab responded, claiming it had records of all invoices being paid and denying any promises of equity or promotions.

=== Art and gameplay design ===
The fictional world of Kena: Bridge of Spirits was inspired by Eastern locations such as Japan and Bali.

For the game's art, Ember Lab partnered with Vietnamese animation studio Sparx. The team visited the studio in Vietnam early in development to ensure a smooth process. Lead environment artist Julian Vermeulen, who worked with Mike Grier on the original prototype in 2016, worked with both studios. Unity was used as the game engine for an early prototype, but later builds shifted to Unreal Engine 4. The majority of development took place on PlayStation 4; the team was unsure if they would be provided a development kit for the PlayStation 5, but Sony eventually approved. The team wanted to make a "rich experience" that could be completed in a weekend.

The game's fictional world is inspired by several Eastern locations, including Japan and Bali. The symbols throughout the game are inspired by Japanese and South East Asian cultures. Combat designer James Beck, who started on the project as animator and lighting/shading artist before transitioning to combat, found working on character animations and enemy behavior simultaneously led to a more seamless integration.

For some time during development, Kena had a separate spirit meter for each ability; however, the team ultimately wanted difficulty in combat to derive from enemies and their attacks rather than resource management—they wanted gameplay to be enjoyable with some depth, but ultimately simple for the player to understand. The ability to cancel animations during gameplay was seen as imperative as it allowed better pacing and responsiveness. Mike and Josh Grier often delayed game testing throughout development as they wanted to present a higher quality product to testers; they ultimately felt testing should have begun earlier in development.

=== Character design ===
Earlier prototypes of the game focused on the Rot as antagonists, and did not feature Kena. When the team created Kena, she was initially younger—around seven or eight years old—but they felt the story and themes required a more experienced and mature protagonist. She originally lacked many powers and relied more heavily on the Rot to complete tasks, which Mike Grier compared to the 2009 game A Boy and His Blob. After exploring more concepts, the team made Kena strong on her own, but more powerful when teamed with the Rot. Lead character designer Vic Kun designed Kena's appearance to match the world while standing out. At one point, Kena had a long cape, but its animation was deemed too distracting and it was replaced with a shawl. Kun intended her clothes to feel asymmetrical, handmade, and practical. The original 3D prototype model of Kena was built by Rodrigo Gonçalves, who refined the real-time rendering on details such as the character's hair. For Kena's hair, the team discovered a blend between solid geometry (for effective lighting and defined shapes) and alpha planes (for individual hair details). Similar work was applied to Kena's clothing and staff, intended to reflect the character's tradition and devotion. The team created a digital library for Kena's facial expressions, hair, and hands, allowing a fast method to select different poses and ensure refinement and consistency in the character.

The development team created a digital library of animated expressions for Kena, allowing for refinement and consistency in the character.

Kena is a young Asian girl. Josh Grier said the team "always planned for a unique lead character that gamers haven't seen before". Dewa Ayu Dewi Larassanti, who voices Kena, originally became involved in the project through her parents, who founded the Balinese ensemble group Gamelan Çudamani and worked with Ember Lab on the game's score; Larassanti performed on some of the songs. Larassanti was chosen for the role partly due to her connections to both Balinese and American cultures, having frequently traveled between the two countries as a child. She found the game's themes were aligned with her life experiences in Bali, and used her knowledge of Balinese culture from her father when interpreting Kena; for example, she would speak in a softer and more formal tone when interacting with her elders. Similarly, she treated the Rot akin to how Balinese people treat the Sesuhunan, the sacred spirits from whom they often ask for blessings and protection.

Larassanti found her studies—a major in world arts and cultures and a minor in ethnomusicology at the University of California, Los Angeles—helped with "opening [her] mind up" for the role. She regularly recorded with Ember Lab on weekends to avoid disruptions with class. Larassanti often rehearsed with her mother, a voice actress, before performing for the role; she used her mother's home recording studio to record her performance. She studied interactions between actors in games like Grand Theft Auto, as well as static or fighting sounds from shows like Avatar: The Last Airbender and The Legend of Korra. The physicality of the role led Larassanti to move while recording, often hitting the microphone or the walls of the recording booth. She would intentionally argue with her brother before recording combat sequences in order to make her performance more believable. She performed most of her recording in mid-2020.

The game's characters were hand-animated using keyframe animation to add more detailed personality. The team wanted the player to feel connected to the Rot by using subtleties of emotion during the game, and use this bond for effective combat gameplay; the creatures were often the focus of development when achieving a specific tone. For his portrayal as Taro, Tod Fennell "made [his] voice a little more vulnerable" to contrast with the corrupted version of Taro (played by a different actor). When depicting Taro's pain and grief, Fennell recalled his feelings of "anger, vulnerability, sadness, and guilt" he felt at 23 when his mother died. He said, after losing a loved one, "it's really hard not to go over what you think you should or could have done differently". Fennell felt working with the smaller team at Ember Lab made the process of his performance more "accessible", and he was surprised by the length and content of the script compared to his previous video game work. Due to the COVID-19 pandemic preventing travel, Ember Lab sent recording equipment to Masashi Odate's home in Japan so he could record his lines for Toshi; while recording fight scenes, he was visited by a concerned security guard. For her role as Saiya, Sam Cavallaro took inspiration from her own life as a protective big sister. She recorded her lines while talking to the development team on Zoom.

=== Music production ===
"Befriending Spirits"
Kena: Bridge of Spirits features traditional gamelan music co-composed by the Balinese ensemble group Gamelan Çudamani. The music features vocals from Kena's voice actress Dewa Ayu Dewi Larassanti, daughter of Çudamani's directors.

The game's original score was composed by Jason Gallaty. Gallaty listened to gamelan music for inspiration, and reached out to gamelan groups in 2017 to seek a collaboration, wanting to remain respectful to the culture. He originally reached out to Balinese ensemble group Gamelan Sekar Jaya, who referred him to Gamelan Çudamani. Çudamani's associate director and lead singer Emiko Saraswati Susilo was initially hesitant, not wanting traditional gamelan music to be featured in a video game, but agreed to collaborate after speaking to the team and resonating with the game's themes; she presented an "orientation" of Balinese culture to Gallaty and the development team, ensuring they would be respectful.

Gallaty and Mike Grier traveled to Bali to record with the group. Çudamani's founding director, Dewa Putu Berata, created original compositions based on footage and descriptions of the game. When Gallaty presented samples of sacred music, Berata would inform him if it was inappropriate, and instead create a new composition with a similar feeling. For one piece of music, Gallaty was inspired by an Indonesian funeral chant; upon discovering its origin, Susilo and Berata used it as inspiration for a new piece, not wanting to disrespect its original usage. The game features music with vocals from Larassanti, Susilo and Berata's daughter, who voices Kena; her performance was recorded "last-minute" while on tour in 2018. Despite being influenced by the films of Disney, the team avoided in-game musical performances to keep the game more grounded.

== Release and promotion ==
The game was announced alongside its debut trailer on June 11, 2020, at PlayStation's Future of Gaming event, scheduled for release in late 2020 for PlayStation 4, PlayStation 5, and Windows. In September 2020, Ember Lab delayed the game to Q1 2021, citing development delays as a result of working from home during the COVID-19 pandemic. In a Sony trailer at the Consumer Electronics Show in January 2021, the game's release window was noted in fine print as March 2021; Sony later removed the fine print from the trailer. During Sony's State of Play presentation in February 2021, a release date of August 24 was set alongside the release of a new trailer. In July 2021, Ember Lab delayed the game again to September 21, citing a need for more time to ensure the game was polished across all platforms. The final pre-release trailer was published on September 20, 2021. The game is a timed console exclusive, and the Windows release was exclusive to the Epic Games Store for one year; it was released on Steam on September 27, 2022. Players who purchase the PlayStation 4 version are able to upgrade for free to the PlayStation 5 version.

Kena: Bridge of Spirits was showcased at the 2021 Tribeca Film Festival, allowing virtual attendees to play an hour-long demo; it competed for the inaugural Tribeca Games Award. The Tribeca Game Spotlight included a new trailer showcasing gameplay. Reception to the game's demo was positive; critics compared it to Pikmin, The Legend of Zelda, and the films of Pixar. PC Gamer's Lauren Morton described the game as "a compact, confident action adventure in a world that belongs on a theater screen", and GamesRadar+'s Sam Loveridge called it one of the most anticipated games of the year. On September 20, 2021, Ember Lab announced the game would feature a photo mode, allowing photographs to be taken in-game. A physical version of the game for PlayStation 4 and PlayStation 5 was announced, released by Maximum Games on November 19. Following the game's release, Mike Grier said Ember Lab was considering possible expansions to the game's combat, and Josh Grier said they would consider releases on other platforms after launch. Three Halloween-style Rot hats were added to the game for a limited time in October 2021, followed by three Christmas-style hats in December, and a tiger hat for Lunar New Year in February 2022.

The game received a content update for its first anniversary on September 27, 2022, adding New Game+, accessibility features, selectable outfits, gameplay charmstones, and a mode called the Spirit Guide Trials. The team wanted the outfits to take some expertise to obtain and remind the player of the story; each outfit borrows elements from characters, such as Rusu's cape and Hana's satchel. They allowed the animators to revisit cloth physics, often requiring hand animation for specific poses. The outfits are unlocked by completing Spirit Guide Trials (available through story progression) and color variants are unlocked with bonus objectives. Deluxe Edition owners received an exclusive outfit. The soundtrack was remastered and expanded for the anniversary. The game was added to the PlayStation Plus catalog in April 2023 for two years, and an avatar of Kena for PlayStation Network (illustrated by Jesús Martínez del Vas) was available for subscribers to celebrate the anniversary of the service's revamp in June. In June 2024, Ember Lab announced the game would release for the Xbox One and Xbox Series X/S on August 15, with exclusive pirate-themed Rot hats; a physical version was released for Xbox Series X. Ember Lab attempted to port the game to the Nintendo Switch but felt it required too many artistic and performance limitations; the development time helped with the creation of the Nintendo Switch 2 version, which was announced on March 5, 2026, and released on March 26.

== Reception ==
=== Critical response ===
Reception

Aggregate scores
Aggregator	Score
Metacritic	83/100 (PC); 81/100 (PS5 & XSXS); 79/100 (NS2); 76/100 (PS4)
OpenCritic	84% recommend

Review scores
Publication	Score
Destructoid	8/10
Game Informer	9/10
GameRevolution	7/10
GameSpot	9/10
GamesRadar+	4/5
IGN	8/10
PC Gamer (US)	65/100
Push Square	7/10

Kena: Bridge of Spirits received "generally favorable" reviews, according to review aggregator website Metacritic, and 84% of critics recommended the game, according to OpenCritic. Mitchell Saltzman of IGN described it as "a wonderful first game from Ember Lab, combining its outstanding pedigree in art and animation with some really solid combat, fantastic world design, and a great balance of action, platforming, puzzle solving, and exploration". Giovanni Colantonio of Digital Trends called it an "exquisitely crafted adventure that fuses classic and modern game design concepts with ease", while Phil Hornshaw of GameSpot wrote it is "an exciting, often heartbreaking journey that will make you want to explore every corner and crevice to see all that you can". In a less positive review, Kotaku's Alex Walker described it as a "mechanically comforting and a constant visual pleasure, albeit lacking in a little ambition".

Reviewers particularly praised the game's artistic design; some critics were unsurprised considering Ember Lab's previous work, and several drew comparisons to the films of Pixar, DreamWorks Animation, and Studio Ghibli. IGN's Saltzman lauded the facial animation and character designs, and PCMag's Tony Polanco wrote they added personality to the characters. Ozzie Mejia of Shacknews considered the game's visuals among the best of the PlayStation 5, and Colantonio of Digital Trends wrote the developer was "pushing video game animation to its limits". Rachel Weber of GamesRadar+ praised the enemy designs, noting they continued to feel alive even when duplicated. The detailed environments and variation of color in the art design was praised. Some critics noticed a discrepancy between the gameplay and cutscenes, with the latter produced at a lower frame rate; Alan Wen of NME considered this outdated, comparing it to PlayStation 2 games. VentureBeat's Mike Minotti lauded the art design but found it began to become "a little monotonous", while Eurogamer's Malindy Hetfeld questioned the use of Balinese and Japanese iconography due to the absence of explanation.

Several critics found the game's exploration and puzzles to be satisfying, imaginative, and rewarding, while others felt the puzzles became repetitive, or their solutions were too simple. Colantonio of Digital Trends appreciated the clear purpose of each tool and mechanic, and GamesRadar+'s Weber thought the best puzzles in the game were the most challenging. Push Square's Stephen Tailby appreciated the game's progression and pacing, while IGN's Saltzman considered it more limiting in terms of player growth. Mejia of Shacknews felt the bow improved the game's traversal puzzles, but the bombs began to "feel awkward and clumsy". GamesRadar+'s Weber found the explanation of the new skills unclear, and Video Games Chronicle's Jordan Middler wrote they added little to the combat sequences. Several critics lauded the challenge and satisfaction of the combat; GameSpot's Hornshaw called it "generally tough and exciting" and the addition of the Rot made it "feel fun and intelligent". Conversely, some reviewers found the combat basic or uninspired, and the dodge and parry to be inconsistent or useless; Eurogamer's Hetfeld said the difficulty was unbalanced between standard fights and boss battles. Reviewers praised the game's fast loading times on PlayStation 5 and the integration of the DualSense; on Windows, PC Gamer's Kemp noted some dips in frame rate during the game's second half.

The Rot were praised for their design and gameplay function, drawing comparisons to the titular creatures of the Pikmin series.

The game's Rot creatures were praised by critics, many of whom drew comparisons to the titular creatures of the Pikmin series. Several reviewers lauded the Rot's involvement in the game's combat; GameSpot's Hetfeld wrote the Rot "makes Kena stand apart from similar games", and GamesRadar+'s Weber felt they "heighten every other aspect" of the game. Paul Tamburro of GameRevolution said the creatures demonstrated the developer's animation skills and appreciated their customization. Push Square's Tailby found the creatures enjoyable in all interactions, and NME's Wen considered them to have more personality than Kena. Conversely, Middler of Video Games Chronicle wrote the Rot "almost feels like an exercise in marketing".

Mejia of Shacknews found the game's narrative to be powerful and emotional, noting it was "so touching that mechanical shortcomings can be forgiven". Colantonio of Digital Trends favorably compared the game's story to Hayao Miyazaki films like Nausicaä of the Valley of the Wind and Princess Mononoke, considering it one of the game's best elements. Push Square's Tailby thought the narrative was predictable but "hits an optimistic yet bittersweet tone, akin to any number of animated films" from the last decade. Middler of Video Games Chronicle remarked a discrepancy in the game's story and the player's actions, and described the writing as a "something you'd see in a B-tier Illumination animation". Matusiak of Gry-Online and Wen of NME found the narrative unmemorable; similarly, Tamburro of GameRevolution considered it forgettable, noting the lack of emotion in its delivery of its themes of bereavement and loss were unaffecting. PC Gamer's Kemp said the story felt incomplete. Shubhankar Parijat of GamingBolt felt the backstory and details of the game's world told a better story than the main narrative.

GameSpot's Hornshaw wrote the character interactions made each area of the world feel more alive. Mejia of Shacknews considered the character arcs to be "heartbreaking". Conversely, some reviewers thought the characters were undeveloped or uninteresting. Kotaku's Walker lauded the developer's skill in character animation, though Push Square's Tailby found some character designs to be "a bit lacking"; Eurogamer's Hetfeld wrote the Pixar-inspired character designs "made it difficult for me to tell if all these characters with Japanese names were in fact Japanese". Several reviewers criticized the lack of character development for the protagonist, Kena; IGN's Saltzman wanted to learn more, and PC Gamer's Kemp was curious enough about her story to keep playing. Some critics lauded the cast's performances—Antistar of Jeuxvideo.com praised Larassanti's performance as Kena, and Walker of Kotaku applauded Odate as Toshi—while others criticized the voice acting; NME's Kemp noted a preference for a silent protagonist and gibberish-speaking supporting characters.

Reviewers lauded the game's music. Jeuxvideo.com's Antistar appreciated its atmosphere and attention to detail, considering it unforgettable. Hornshaw of GameSpot described the score as "excellent" and "immersive", and Jordan Devore of Destructoid found it "tranquil" with "a few earworms". GameRevolution's Tamburro praised the reflection of the Balinese music on the game's cultural influence. Andrew Reiner of Game Informer "found [himself] humming along to the excellently composed low-key melodies". Gry-Online's Matusiak praised the atmospheric soundtrack, though noted a lack of effective sound design during combat.

Several critics commented on the game's originality and its borrowing of successful elements from other popular games, with both favorable and unfavorable comparisons to Beyond Good & Evil, Jak and Daxter, and The Legend of Zelda. Colantonio of Digital Trends found its familiar structural beats "warm" and "comforting", and Saltzman of IGN considered it "simple and formulaic, but it works elegantly". Kotaku's Walker compared the game to PlayStation-era platformers like Spyro the Dragon and Ty the Tasmanian Tiger, though noted critical comparisons felt harsh for a first-time production from a small studio like Ember Lab. Push Square's Tailby appreciated the callback to PlayStation 2-era action platformers; similarly, Devore of Destructoid compared it to "a gorgeous, modern-day take on a tried-and-true older-era platformer", which he considered "basic". Antistar of Jeuxvideo.com noted a feeling of familiarity in the game, but appreciated its uniqueness in its personality. Ewan Wilson of Polygon wrote the "absence of any original identity" signaled a lack of imagination, highlighting particular similarities with Studio Ghibli and its films like Princess Mononoke; Wilson described the game as "God of War without the gruesome finishing moves ... Ghost of Tsushima without the expansive cast of characters ... Horizon Zero Dawn without the sprawling scope". Wen of NME hoped Ember Lab would continue to build on its inspirations for a more original project in future.

=== Accolades ===
Kena: Bridge of Spirits was awarded Game of the Year from Houston Press, and was ranked among the year's best by Ars Technica, GameSpot, GamesRadar+, and USA Today. It was nominated for PlayStation Game of the Year at the 39th Annual Golden Joystick Awards. At the Game Awards 2021, it won Best Independent Game and Best Debut Indie Game; it was nominated for Best Art Direction and was included in the first round of 30 games selected for the audience-voted Players' Voice award. From PlayStation Blog, the game won Independent Game of the Year and was fourth runner-up for Best Graphical Showcase. It won Best Indie at the inaugural Arab Game Awards, and was nominated for one award at the 49th Annie Awards, 18th British Academy Games Awards, 33rd GLAAD Media Awards, and 11th Annual New York Game Awards, two at the 22nd Game Developers Choice Awards, and four at the 25th Annual D.I.C.E. Awards. It led the nominees at the SXSW Gaming Awards with four nominations, of which it won one, and it won one of its two nominations at the Webby Awards. The main theme music, "Beneath Worlds", won Best Main Theme at the 20th Annual Game Audio Network Guild Awards.

Award	Date	Category	Recipient(s) and nominee(s)	Result	Ref.
Annie Awards	March 12, 2022	Outstanding Achievement for Character Animation in a Video Game	Kena: Bridge of Spirits	Nominated	
British Academy Games Awards	April 7, 2022	Animation	Hunter Schmidt	Nominated	
D.I.C.E. Awards	February 24, 2022	Outstanding Achievement in Animation	Hunter Schmidt	Nominated	
D.I.C.E. Awards	February 24, 2022	Outstanding Achievement in Art Direction	Mike Grier, Wanchana "Vic" Intrasombat, Julian Vermeulen	Nominated	
D.I.C.E. Awards	February 24, 2022	Outstanding Achievement in Character	Kena (written by Josh Grier, voiced by Dewa Ayu Dewi Larrasanti)	Nominated	
D.I.C.E. Awards	February 24, 2022	Outstanding Achievement in Original Music Composition	Jason Gallaty, I Dewa Putu Berata	Nominated	
Game Audio Network Guild Awards	May 25, 2022	Best Main Theme	"Beneath Worlds"	Won	
The Game Awards	December 9, 2021	Best Independent Game	Kena: Bridge of Spirits	Won	
The Game Awards	December 9, 2021	Best Debut Indie Game	Kena: Bridge of Spirits	Won	
The Game Awards	December 9, 2021	Best Art Direction	Kena: Bridge of Spirits	Nominated	
Game Developers Choice Awards	March 23, 2022	Best Debut	Kena: Bridge of Spirits	Nominated	
Game Developers Choice Awards	March 23, 2022	Best Visual Art	Kena: Bridge of Spirits	Nominated	
GLAAD Media Awards	April 2, 2022	Outstanding Video Game	Kena: Bridge of Spirits	Nominated	
Golden Joystick Awards	November 23, 2021	PlayStation Game of the Year	Kena: Bridge of Spirits	Nominated	
New York Game Awards	February 1, 2022	Central Park Children's Zoo Award for Best Kids Game	Kena: Bridge of Spirits	Nominated	
The Steam Awards	January 3, 2023	Outstanding Visual Style	Kena: Bridge of Spirits	Nominated	
SXSW Gaming Awards	March 12, 2022	Indie Game of the Year	Kena: Bridge of Spirits	Won	
SXSW Gaming Awards	March 12, 2022	Excellence in Animation, Art, & Visual Achievement	Kena: Bridge of Spirits	Nominated	
SXSW Gaming Awards	March 12, 2022	Excellence in Original Score	Kena: Bridge of Spirits	Nominated	
SXSW Gaming Awards	March 12, 2022	Excellence in Narrative	Kena: Bridge of Spirits	Nominated	
Webby Awards	April 26, 2022	Games, Adventure	Kena: Bridge of Spirits	Won	
Webby Awards	April 26, 2022	Games, Best Art Direction	Kena: Bridge of Spirits	Nominated	

== Sales ==
Kena: Bridge of Spirits broke-even within one month; Josh Grier said Sony was "happy" with the results. It was the most-downloaded PlayStation 5 game of September 2021 in Europe, and the third-most in North America; the PlayStation 4 version was 16th in Europe. In October, it was the fifth-most-downloaded PlayStation 5 game in Europe and fifteenth in North America; in December, it was ninth in North America. For the year overall, it was the seventh-most-downloaded PlayStation 5 game in Europe, and the twentieth in North America. In January 2022, it ranked twelfth in Europe and eighteenth in North America; it ranked seventeenth in Europe in February, and thirteenth in Europe and nineteenth in North America in April. According to Ember Lab, players had "found over 40 million Rot and over 8 million unique hats" by April 2023.

== Sequel ==
After the game's release, Josh Grier said the team was unsure if they would make a sequel, but they were willing to explore other mediums like television or film. Ember Lab announced a sequel, Kena: Scars of Kosmora, at Sony's State of Play presentation in February 2026. It is scheduled for release for PlayStation 5 and Windows in 2027. The game follows Kena as an older and more experienced spirit guide, seeking to learn more about her affliction. She travels to the island of Kosmora, where she is forced to use an alchemy-based form of spirit guiding.
