= Game Developers Choice Award for Game of the Year =

Annual video game award

The Game Developers Choice Award for the Game of the Year, also known as GDCA Game of the Year, is the main video game award presented at the Game Developers Conference (GDC), the largest annual gathering of professional video game developers. The conference, usually held in or around March in San Francisco, presents the award as part of the Game Developers Choice Awards (GDCA), a series of awards honoring outstanding achievements in video game design for games released during the previous calendar year. It has been awarded since 2001.

Only four studios have won the award more than once:

- Valve, for Half-Life 2 (2004) and Portal (2007)
- Bethesda Game Studios, for Fallout 3 (2008) and The Elder Scrolls V: Skyrim (2011)
- Naughty Dog, for Uncharted 2: Among Thieves (2009) and The Last of Us (2013)
- Rockstar Games, for Grand Theft Auto III (2001) and Red Dead Redemption (2010)

The most successful video game publisher to date is Sony Interactive Entertainment with 13 nominations and 4 wins, followed by Nintendo (11 nominations, 1 win), Electronic Arts (8 nominations and 1 win) and Rockstar Games (7 nominations and 2 wins). Indie games have won the award 5 times: Journey (published by Sony Interactive Entertainment) in 2012, Untitled Goose Game in 2019, Hades in 2020, Inscryption in 2021, and Balatro in 2024.

== List of winners ==
=== 2000s ===
Note: From 2005 to 2007 the award was titled Best Game. Years listed represent calendar years for which the awards were given. Ceremonies are usually held in March the following year.

Year	Game	Developer(s)	Publisher(s)	Ref.
2000 (1st)	The Sims	Maxis	Electronic Arts	
2000 (1st)	Deus Ex	Ion Storm	Eidos Interactive	
2000 (1st)	Jet Set Radio	Smilebit	Sega	
2000 (1st)	No One Lives Forever	Monolith Productions	Fox Interactive	
2000 (1st)	Shenmue	Sega AM2	Sega	
2001 (2nd)	Grand Theft Auto III	DMA Design	Rockstar Games	
2001 (2nd)	Black & White	Lionhead Studios	Electronic Arts	
2001 (2nd)	Halo: Combat Evolved	Bungie	Microsoft Game Studios	
2001 (2nd)	Ico	Team Ico	Sony Computer Entertainment	
2001 (2nd)	Max Payne	Remedy Entertainment	Gathering of Developers / Rockstar Games	
2002 (3rd)	Metroid Prime	Retro Studios	Nintendo	
2002 (3rd)	Battlefield 1942	Digital Illusions	Electronic Arts	
2002 (3rd)	Grand Theft Auto: Vice City	Rockstar North	Rockstar Games	
2002 (3rd)	Neverwinter Nights	BioWare	Atari	
2002 (3rd)	Tom Clancy's Splinter Cell	Ubisoft Montreal	Ubisoft	
2003 (4th)	Star Wars: Knights of the Old Republic	BioWare	LucasArts	
2003 (4th)	Beyond Good & Evil	Ubisoft Montpellier / Ubisoft Milan	Ubisoft	
2003 (4th)	Call of Duty	Infinity Ward	Activision	
2003 (4th)	Prince of Persia: The Sands of Time	Ubisoft Montreal	Ubisoft	
2003 (4th)	The Legend of Zelda: The Wind Waker	Nintendo EAD	Nintendo	
2004 (5th)	Half-Life 2	Valve	Valve	
2004 (5th)	Burnout 3: Takedown	Criterion Games	Electronic Arts	
2004 (5th)	Grand Theft Auto: San Andreas	Rockstar North	Rockstar Games	
2004 (5th)	Katamari Damacy	Namco	Namco	
2004 (5th)	World of Warcraft	Blizzard Entertainment	Blizzard Entertainment	
2005 (6th)	Shadow of the Colossus	Team Ico	Sony Computer Entertainment	
2005 (6th)	Animal Crossing: Wild World	Nintendo EAD	Nintendo	
2005 (6th)	God of War	Santa Monica Studio	Sony Computer Entertainment	
2005 (6th)	Guitar Hero	Harmonix	RedOctane	
2005 (6th)	The Movies	Lionhead Studios	Activision	
2006 (7th)	Gears of War	Epic Games	Microsoft Game Studios	
2006 (7th)	The Elder Scrolls IV: Oblivion	Bethesda Game Studios	Bethesda Softworks	
2006 (7th)	The Legend of Zelda: Twilight Princess	Nintendo EAD	Nintendo	
2006 (7th)	Ōkami	Clover Studio	Capcom	
2006 (7th)	Wii Sports	Nintendo EAD	Nintendo	
2007 (8th)	Portal	Valve	Valve	
2007 (8th)	BioShock	2K Boston / 2K Australia	2K Games	
2007 (8th)	Call of Duty 4: Modern Warfare	Infinity Ward	Activision	
2007 (8th)	Rock Band	Harmonix	MTV Games / Electronic Arts	
2007 (8th)	Super Mario Galaxy	Nintendo EAD Tokyo	Nintendo	
2008 (9th)	Fallout 3	Bethesda Game Studios	Bethesda Softworks	
2008 (9th)	Fable II	Lionhead Studios	Microsoft Game Studios	
2008 (9th)	Grand Theft Auto IV	Rockstar North	Rockstar Games	
2008 (9th)	LittleBigPlanet	Media Molecule	Sony Computer Entertainment	
2008 (9th)	Left 4 Dead	Turtle Rock Studios	Valve	
2009 (10th)	Uncharted 2: Among Thieves	Naughty Dog	Sony Computer Entertainment	
2009 (10th)	Assassin's Creed II	Ubisoft Montreal	Ubisoft	
2009 (10th)	Batman: Arkham Asylum	Rocksteady Studios	Eidos Interactive / Warner Bros. Interactive Entertainment	
2009 (10th)	Demon's Souls	FromSoftware	Sony Computer Entertainment	
2009 (10th)	Dragon Age: Origins	BioWare	Electronic Arts	

=== 2010s ===
Year	Game	Developer(s)	Publisher(s)	Ref.
2010 (11th)	Red Dead Redemption	Rockstar San Diego	Rockstar Games	
2010 (11th)	Assassin's Creed: Brotherhood	Ubisoft Montreal	Ubisoft	
2010 (11th)	Call of Duty: Black Ops	Treyarch	Activision	
2010 (11th)	Limbo	Playdead	Playdead	
2010 (11th)	Mass Effect 2	BioWare	Electronic Arts	
2011 (12th)	The Elder Scrolls V: Skyrim	Bethesda Game Studios	Bethesda Softworks	
2011 (12th)	Batman: Arkham City	Rocksteady Studios	Warner Bros. Interactive Entertainment	
2011 (12th)	Dark Souls	FromSoftware	Namco Bandai Games	
2011 (12th)	Deus Ex: Human Revolution	Eidos Montréal	Square Enix	
2011 (12th)	Portal 2	Valve	Valve	
2012 (13th)	Journey	Thatgamecompany	Sony Computer Entertainment	
2012 (13th)	Dishonored	Arkane Studios	Bethesda Softworks	
2012 (13th)	Mass Effect 3	BioWare	Electronic Arts	
2012 (13th)	The Walking Dead	Telltale Games	Telltale Games	
2012 (13th)	XCOM: Enemy Unknown	Firaxis Games	2K Games	
2013 (14th)	The Last of Us	Naughty Dog	Sony Computer Entertainment	
2013 (14th)	Gone Home	The Fullbright Company	The Fullbright Company	
2013 (14th)	Grand Theft Auto V	Rockstar North	Rockstar Games	
2013 (14th)	Super Mario 3D World	Nintendo EAD Tokyo	Nintendo	
2013 (14th)	Tomb Raider	Crystal Dynamics	Square Enix	
2014 (15th)	Middle-earth: Shadow of Mordor	Monolith Productions	Warner Bros. Interactive Entertainment	
2014 (15th)	Alien: Isolation	Creative Assembly	Sega	
2014 (15th)	Bayonetta 2	PlatinumGames	Nintendo	
2014 (15th)	Destiny	Bungie	Activision	
2014 (15th)	Hearthstone	Blizzard Entertainment	Blizzard Entertainment	
2015 (16th)	The Witcher 3: Wild Hunt	CD Projekt Red	CD Projekt	
2015 (16th)	Bloodborne	FromSoftware	Sony Computer Entertainment	
2015 (16th)	Fallout 4	Bethesda Game Studios	Bethesda Softworks	
2015 (16th)	Metal Gear Solid V: The Phantom Pain	Kojima Productions	Konami	
2015 (16th)	Rocket League	Psyonix	Psyonix	
2016 (17th)	Overwatch	Blizzard Entertainment	Blizzard Entertainment	
2016 (17th)	Dishonored 2	Arkane Studios	Bethesda Softworks	
2016 (17th)	Firewatch	Campo Santo	Panic	
2016 (17th)	Inside	Playdead	Playdead	
2016 (17th)	Uncharted 4: A Thief's End	Naughty Dog	Sony Interactive Entertainment	
2017 (18th)	The Legend of Zelda: Breath of the Wild	Nintendo EPD	Nintendo	
2017 (18th)	Horizon Zero Dawn	Guerrilla Games	Sony Interactive Entertainment	
2017 (18th)	Nier: Automata	PlatinumGames	Square Enix	
2017 (18th)	PlayerUnknown's Battlegrounds	PUBG Corporation	PUBG Corporation	
2017 (18th)	Super Mario Odyssey	Nintendo EPD	Nintendo	
2018 (19th)	God of War	Santa Monica Studio	Sony Interactive Entertainment	
2018 (19th)	Celeste	Maddy Makes Games	Maddy Makes Games	
2018 (19th)	Marvel's Spider-Man	Insomniac Games	Sony Interactive Entertainment	
2018 (19th)	Red Dead Redemption 2	Rockstar Games	Rockstar Games	
2018 (19th)	Return of the Obra Dinn	Lucas Pope	3909 LLC	
2019 (20th)	Untitled Goose Game	House House	Panic	
2019 (20th)	Control	Remedy Entertainment	505 Games	
2019 (20th)	Death Stranding	Kojima Productions	Sony Interactive Entertainment	
2019 (20th)	Sekiro: Shadows Die Twice	FromSoftware	Activision	
2019 (20th)	Outer Wilds	Mobius Digital	Annapurna Interactive	

=== 2020s ===
Year	Game	Developer(s)	Publisher(s)	Ref.
2020 (21st)	Hades	Supergiant Games	Supergiant Games	
2020 (21st)	Animal Crossing: New Horizons	Nintendo EPD	Nintendo	
2020 (21st)	Ghost of Tsushima	Sucker Punch Productions	Sony Interactive Entertainment	
2020 (21st)	Half-Life: Alyx	Valve	Valve	
2020 (21st)	The Last of Us Part II	Naughty Dog	Sony Interactive Entertainment	
2021 (22nd)	Inscryption	Daniel Mullins Games	Devolver Digital	
2021 (22nd)	Deathloop	Arkane Studios	Bethesda Softworks	
2021 (22nd)	Forza Horizon 5	Playground Games	Xbox Game Studios	
2021 (22nd)	It Takes Two	Hazelight Studios	Electronic Arts	
2021 (22nd)	Resident Evil Village	Capcom	Capcom	
2022 (23rd)	Elden Ring	FromSoftware	Bandai Namco Entertainment	
2022 (23rd)	God of War Ragnarök	Santa Monica Studio	Sony Interactive Entertainment	
2022 (23rd)	Immortality	Sam Barlow	Half Mermaid Productions	
2022 (23rd)	Pentiment	Obsidian Entertainment	Xbox Game Studios	
2022 (23rd)	Stray	BlueTwelve Studio	Annapurna Interactive	
2022 (23rd)	Tunic	Finji	Finji	
2023 (24th)	Baldur's Gate 3	Larian Studios	Larian Studios	
2023 (24th)	Cocoon	Geometric Interactive	Annapurna Interactive	
2023 (24th)	Dave the Diver	Mintrocket	Mintrocket	
2023 (24th)	Dredge	Black Salt Games	Team17	
2023 (24th)	Marvel's Spider-Man 2	Insomniac Games	Sony Interactive Entertainment	
2023 (24th)	The Legend of Zelda: Tears of the Kingdom	Nintendo EPD	Nintendo	
2024 (25th)	Balatro	LocalThunk	Playstack	
2024 (25th)	Astro Bot	Team Asobi	Sony Interactive Entertainment	
2024 (25th)	Black Myth: Wukong	Game Science	Game Science	
2024 (25th)	Final Fantasy VII Rebirth	Square Enix	Square Enix	
2024 (25th)	Helldivers 2	Arrowhead Game Studios	Sony Interactive Entertainment	
2024 (25th)	Metaphor: ReFantazio	Studio Zero	Atlus, Sega	
2025 (26th)	Clair Obscur: Expedition 33	Sandfall Interactive	Kepler Interactive	
2025 (26th)	Blue Prince	Dogubomb	Raw Fury	
2025 (26th)	Donkey Kong Bananza	Nintendo EPD	Nintendo	
2025 (26th)	Ghost of Yōtei	Sucker Punch Productions	Sony Interactive Entertainment	
2025 (26th)	Hollow Knight: Silksong	Team Cherry	Team Cherry	
2025 (26th)	Split Fiction	Hazelight Studios	Electronic Arts	
