= 19th Game Developers Choice Awards =

Award ceremony

- Date: March 20, 2019
- Venue: Game Developers Conference, Moscone Convention Center
- Country: San Francisco, California, USA
- Hosted by: Tim Schafer

Highlights
- Most nominations: Red Dead Redemption 2 (7)
- Lifetime Achievement Award: Amy Hennig
- Pioneer Award: Rieko Kodama
- Game of the Year: God of War

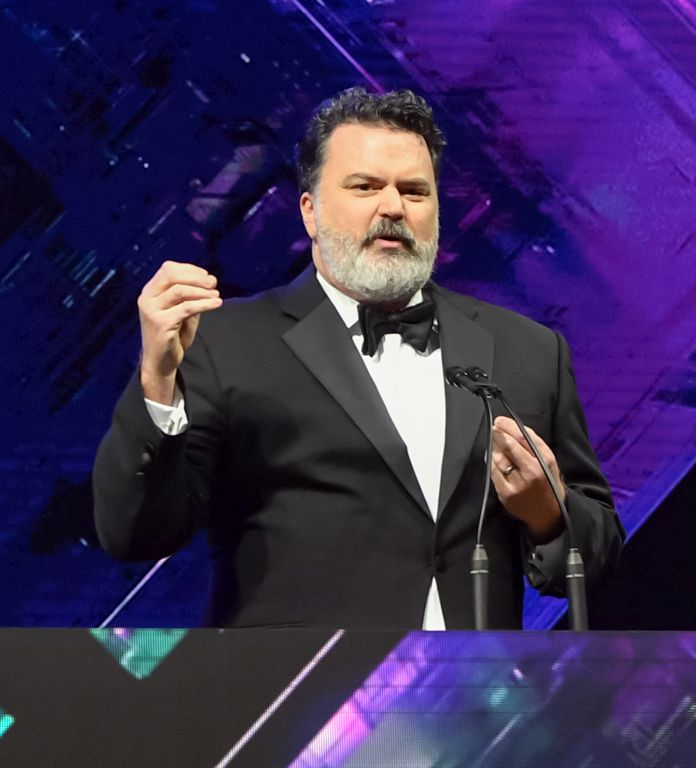
Schafer as host of the 2019 Game Developers Choice Awards

The 19th Game Developers Choice Awards was an award ceremony by Game Developers Choice Awards held at the Game Developers Conference, for outstanding game developers and video games. It was hosted by Tim Schafer.

American video game director, Amy Hennig (Naughty Dog) received the Lifetime Achievement Award. Rieko Kodama received the Pioneer Award for her contributions during her time with Sega and video games such as Alex Kidd, Phantasy Star and Sonic the Hedgehog.

== Winners and nominees ==
=== Game of the Year ===
- God of War (Santa Monica Studio/Sony Interactive Entertainment)
  - Celeste (Maddy Makes Games)
  - Red Dead Redemption 2 (Rockstar Games)
  - Return of the Obra Dinn (3909 LLC)
  - Spider-Man (Insomniac Games)

=== Best Audio ===
- Celeste (Maddy Makes Games)
  - Red Dead Redemption 2 (Rockstar Games)
  - God of War (Santa Monica Studio/Sony Interactive Entertainment)
  - Spider-Man (Insomniac Games)
  - Tetris Effect (Monstars/Resonair)

=== Best Debut Developer ===
- Mountains (Florence)
  - Polyarc (Moss)
  - Nomada Studio (Gris)
  - Villa Gorilla (Yoku's Island Express)
  - Sabotage Studio (The Messenger)

=== Best Design ===
- Into the Breach (Subset Games)
  - Spider-Man (Insomniac Games)
  - Celeste (Maddy Makes Games)
  - Red Dead Redemption 2 (Rockstar Games)
  - God of War (Santa Monica Studio/Sony Interactive Entertainment)

=== Best Mobile Game ===
- Florence (Mountains)
  - Alto's Odyssey (Team Alto)
  - Reigns: Game of Thrones (Nerial)
  - Holedown (Grapefrukt Games)
  - Donut County (Annapurna Interactive)

=== Innovation Award ===
- Nintendo Labo (Nintendo)
  - Red Dead Redemption 2 (Rockstar Games)
  - Florence (Mountains)
  - Tetris Effect (Monstars/Resonair)
  - Return of the Obra Dinn (3909 LLC)

=== Best Narrative ===
- Return of the Obra Dinn (3909 LLC)
  - Florence (Mountains)
  - God of War (Santa Monica Studio/Sony Interactive Entertainment)
  - Spider-Man (Insomniac Games)
  - Red Dead Redemption 2 (Rockstar Games)

=== Best Technology ===
- Red Dead Redemption 2 (Rockstar Games)
  - Spider-Man (Insomniac Games)
  - Assassin's Creed Odyssey (Ubisoft)
  - Forza Horizon 4 (Turn 10 Studios/Playground Games)
  - God of War (Santa Monica Studio/Sony Interactive Entertainment)

=== Best Visual Art ===
- Gris (Nomada Studios)
  - Spider-Man (Insomniac Games)
  - God of War (Santa Monica Studio/Sony Interactive Entertainment)
  - Return of the Obra Dinn (3909 LLC)
  - Red Dead Redemption 2 (Rockstar Games)

=== Best Virtual Reality Game ===
- Beat Saber (Beat Games)
  - Budget Cuts (Neat Corporation)
  - Tetris Effect (Monstar/Resonair)
  - Moss (Polyarc)
  - Astro Bot Rescue Mission (Japan Studio/Sony Interactive Entertainment)

=== Audience Award ===
- Beat Saber (Beat Games)

=== Pioneer Award ===
- Rieko Kodama, known for her work on role-playing games (RPGs) including the original Phantasy Star series, the 7th Dragon series, and Skies of Arcadia (2000)

=== Lifetime Achievement Award ===
- Amy Hennig, known for her work on the Uncharted series with Naughty Dog, directing the original 2007 PlayStation 3 exclusive and serving as creative director on the second and third installments of the series
