= 22nd Game Developers Choice Awards =

2022 video game awards ceremony

- Date: March 23, 2022
- Venue: Moscone Center
- Hosted by: Leslee Sullivant

Highlights
- Most awards: Ratchet & Clank: Rift Apart, Unpacking (2)
- Most nominations: Deathloop (6)
- Lifetime Achievement Award: Yuji Horii
- Ambassador Award: Steven Spohn
- Game of the Year: Inscryption

The 22nd Game Developers Choice Awards was an award ceremony by Game Developers Choice Awards for outstanding game developers and video games which was held on March 23, 2022. The ceremony was held alongside the Independent Games Festival awards.

== Winners and nominees ==
Nominees were announced on January 11, 2022. Winners (noted in bold below) were named on March 23, 2022 in a ceremony hosted by Leslee Sullivant at the Moscone Center.

=== Game of the Year ===
- **Inscryption** (Daniel Mullins Games/Devolver Digital)
  - Deathloop (Arkane Studios/Bethesda Softworks)
  - Forza Horizon 5 (Playground Games/Xbox Game Studios)
  - It Takes Two (Hazelight Studios/Electronic Arts)
  - Resident Evil Village (Capcom)

=== Best Audio ===
- **Unpacking** (Witch Beam /Humble Bundle)
  - Deathloop (Arkane Studios/Bethesda Softworks)
  - Forza Horizon 5 (Playground Games/Xbox Game Studios)
  - Marvel's Guardians of the Galaxy (Eidos-Montréal/Square Enix)
  - Returnal (Housemarque/Sony Interactive Entertainment)

=== Best Debut ===
- **Valheim** (Iron Gate Studio/Coffee Stain Publishing)
  - The Artful Escape (Beethoven & Dinosaur/Annapurna Interactive)
  - Kena: Bridge of Spirits (Ember Lab)
  - Sable (Shedworks/Raw Fury)
  - Wildermyth (Worldwalker Games/WhisperGames)

=== Best Design ===
- **Inscryption** (Daniel Mullins Games/Devolver Digital)
  - Deathloop (Arkane Studios/Bethesda Softworks)
  - Halo Infinite (343 Industries/Xbox Game Studios)
  - It Takes Two (Hazelight Studios/Electronic Arts)
  - Psychonauts 2 (Double Fine/Xbox Game Studios)

=== Innovation Award ===
- **Inscryption** (Daniel Mullins Games/Devolver Digital)
  - Deathloop (Arkane Studios/Bethesda Softworks)
  - It Takes Two (Hazelight Studios/Electronic Arts)
  - Unpacking (Witch Beam /Humble Bundle)
  - Wildermyth (Worldwalker Games/WhisperGames)

=== Best Narrative ===
- **Psychonauts 2** (Double Fine/Xbox Game Studios)
  - Deathloop (Arkane Studios/Bethesda Softworks)
  - It Takes Two (Hazelight Studios/Electronic Arts)
  - Marvel's Guardians of the Galaxy (Eidos-Montréal/Square Enix)
  - Unpacking (Witch Beam /Humble Bundle)

=== Best Technology ===
- **Ratchet & Clank: Rift Apart** (Insomniac Games/Sony Interactive Entertainment)
  - Forza Horizon 5 (Playground Games/Xbox Game Studios)
  - Halo Infinite (343 Industries/Xbox Game Studios)
  - Hitman 3 (IO Interactive)
  - Returnal (Housemarque/Sony Interactive Entertainment)

=== Best Visual Art ===
- **Ratchet & Clank: Rift Apart** (Insomniac Games/Sony Interactive Entertainment)
  - Deathloop (Arkane Studios/Bethesda Softworks)
  - Forza Horizon 5 (Playground Games/Xbox Game Studios)
  - Kena: Bridge of Spirits (Ember Lab)
  - Psychonauts 2 (Double Fine/Xbox Game Studios)

=== Social Impact Award ===
- **Boyfriend Dungeon** (Kitfox Games)
  - Before Your Eyes (GoodbyeWorld Games/Skybound Games)
  - Chicory: A Colorful Tale (The Chicory: A Colorful Tale Team/Finji)
  - It Takes Two (Hazelight Studios/Electronic Arts)
  - Life Is Strange: True Colors (Deck Nine/Square Enix)

=== Audience Award ===
- **Valheim** (Iron Gate Studio / **Coffee Stain Publishing**)

=== Lifetime Achievement Award ===
Yuji Horii, creator of the Dragon Quest series

=== Ambassador Award ===
Steven Spohn, founder of AbleGamers
