= Mark DeLoura =

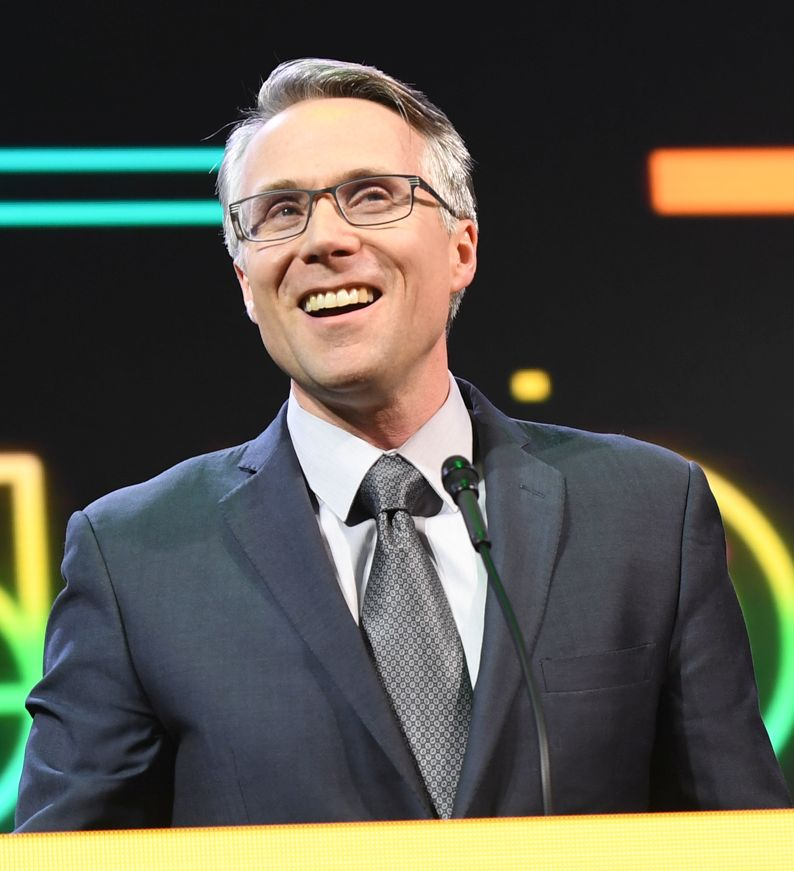
- DeLoura at the Game Developers Choice Awards 2017
- Born: 1969 or 1970 (age 56–57)
- Education: University of North Carolina at Chapel Hill
- Occupations: Video gaming advocate, author
- Website: satori.org

Mark A. DeLoura (born 1969 or 1970) is a video gaming advocate and an author. He served as the Senior Advisor for Digital Media for the White House Office of Science and Technology Policy (OSTP), he was Editor in Chief of Game Developer magazine, and he has held various gaming-related positions at major companies including Sony, Nintendo, Ubisoft, THQ, and Google.

== Career ==
DeLoura is a Game Developer's Conference Advisory Board Emeritus member after having served on the board for more than ten years, and is the author of the Game Programming Gems series of books.

DeLoura has been the Vice President of Technology at THQ, Technical Director of Ubisoft North America, Manager of Developer Relations at Sony Computer Entertainment America, Editor in Chief of Game Developer magazine, and Lead Engineer at Nintendo of America.

In 2010, he joined Google as a video game developer advocate.

In 2013, DeLoura was appointed to the position of Senior Advisor for Digital Media at the White House Office of Science and Technology Policy (OSTP). Started by the Obama administration, the position was created to understand how video games and media can be applied to improve education and engagement around civics, healthcare, education, and citizen science. In this role, DeLoura led the Federal Games Guild.

On September 7, 2014, DeLoura hosted the first ever "Game Jam" to be held at the White House. This event was attended by 102 game developers divided into 23 teams, who created game prototypes in categories including science, math, healthcare, and politics. Attending developers included Playmatics, Red Storm Entertainment, Rovio, GlassLab (an Electronic Arts joint project with educational institutions), the Smithsonian Institution, BrainPOP, and game industry veteran Graeme Devine.

At the 2017 Game Developers Choice Awards, DeLoura was given the Ambassador's Award, recognizing his contributions to the video game industry.
