= 21st Game Developers Choice Awards =

2021 video game awards ceremony

- Date: July 21, 2021
- Venue: Online

Highlights
- Most awards: Hades (3)
- Most nominations: Ghost of Tsushima, Hades, The Last of Us Part II (6)
- Lifetime Achievement Award: Laralyn McWilliams
- Pioneer Award: Tom Fulp
- Game of the Year: Hades

The 21st Game Developers Choice Awards was an award ceremony by Game Developers Choice Awards for outstanding game developers and video games held on July 21, 2021. The ceremony was held alongside the Independent Games Festival awards, with both events presented through virtual streaming video due to the ongoing COVID-19 pandemic. Hades was named as Game of the Year.

== Winners and nominees ==
Nominees were announced on April 20, 2021, Winners (noted in bold below) were named on July 21, 2021.

=== Game of the Year ===
- **Hades** (Supergiant Games)
  - Animal Crossing: New Horizons (Nintendo EPD/Nintendo)
  - Half-Life: Alyx (Valve)
  - Ghost of Tsushima (Sucker Punch Productions/Sony Interactive Entertainment)
  - The Last of Us Part II (Naughty Dog/Sony Interactive Entertainment)

=== Best Audio ===
- **Hades** (Supergiant Games)
  - Doom Eternal (id Software/Bethesda Softworks)
  - Final Fantasy VII Remake (Square Enix)
  - Ghost of Tsushima (Sucker Punch Productions/Sony Interactive Entertainment)
  - The Last of Us Part II (Naughty Dog/Sony Interactive Entertainment)

=== Best Debut Developer ===
- **Phasmophobia** (Kinetic Games)
  - Carrion (Phobia Game Studio/Devolver Digital)
  - Mortal Shell (Cold Symmetry / Playstack)
  - Raji: An Ancient Epic (Nodding Heads Games / Super!Com)
  - Umurangi Generation (Origame Digital / Playism, Origame Digital)

=== Best Design ===
- **Hades** (Supergiant Games)
  - Animal Crossing: New Horizons (Nintendo EPD/Nintendo)
  - Half-Life: Alyx (Valve)
  - Ghost of Tsushima (Sucker Punch Productions/Sony Interactive Entertainment)
  - The Last of Us Part II (Naughty Dog/Sony Interactive Entertainment)

=== Best Mobile Game ===
- **Genshin Impact** (miHoYo)
  - Alba: A Wildlife Adventure (ustwo/PID Publishing)
  - If Found... (Dreamfeel/Annapurna Interactive)
  - Legends of Runeterra (Riot Games)
  - The Pathless (Giant Squid/Annapurna Interactive)

=== Innovation Award ===
- **Dreams** (Media Molecule/Sony Interactive Entertainment)
  - Fall Guys: Ultimate Knockout (Mediatonic/Devolver Digital)
  - Hades (Supergiant Games)
  - Half-Life: Alyx (Valve)
  - Microsoft Flight Simulator (Asobo Studio/Xbox Game Studios)

=== Best Narrative ===
- **The Last of Us Part II** (Naughty Dog/Sony Interactive Entertainment)
  - Final Fantasy VII Remake (Square Enix)
  - Ghost of Tsushima (Sucker Punch Productions/Sony Interactive Entertainment)
  - Hades (Supergiant Games)
  - Kentucky Route Zero: TV Edition (Cardboard Computer/Annapurna Interactive)

=== Best Technology ===
- **Microsoft Flight Simulator** (Asobo Studio/Xbox Game Studios)
  - Dreams (Media Molecule/Sony Interactive Entertainment)
  - Ghost of Tsushima (Sucker Punch Productions/Sony Interactive Entertainment)
  - Half-Life: Alyx (Valve)
  - The Last of Us Part II (Naughty Dog/Sony Interactive Entertainment)

=== Best Visual Art ===
- **Ghost of Tsushima** (Sucker Punch Productions/Sony Interactive Entertainment)
  - Cyberpunk 2077 (CD Projekt RED/CD Projekt)
  - Hades (Supergiant Games)
  - The Last of Us Part II (Naughty Dog/Sony Interactive Entertainment)
  - Ori and the Will of the Wisps (Moon Studios/Xbox Game Studios/iam8bit)

=== Best VR/AR Game ===
- **Half-Life: Alyx** (Valve)
  - Dreams (Media Molecule/Sony Interactive Entertainment)
  - Paper Beast (Pixel Reef)
  - Star Wars: Squadrons (Motive Studios/Electronic Arts)
  - The Walking Dead: Saints & Sinners (Skydance Interactive)

=== Audience Award ===
- **Ghost of Tsushima** – Sucker Punch Productions

=== Pioneer Award ===
- Tom Fulp, creator of Newgrounds and co-founder of The Behemoth

=== Lifetime Achievement Award ===
- Laralyn McWilliams, director of Free Realms and Full Spectrum Warrior
