= Inscryption =

2021 video game

- Developer: Daniel Mullins Games
- Publisher: Devolver Digital
- Director: Daniel Mullins
- Composer: Jonah Senzel
- Engine: Unity
- Platforms: Windows; Linux; macOS; PlayStation 4; PlayStation 5; Nintendo Switch; Xbox One; Xbox Series X/S
- Release: Windows; October 19, 2021; Linux, macOS; June 23, 2022; PS4, PS5; August 30, 2022; Switch; December 1, 2022; Xbox One, Series X/S; April 10, 2023
- Genre: Roguelike deck-building
- Mode: Single-player

Inscryption is a 2021 roguelike deck-building game developed by Daniel Mullins Games and published by Devolver Digital. Directed by Daniel Mullins, it was originally released for Windows on October 19, 2021, and on Linux, macOS, PlayStation 4, PlayStation 5, Nintendo Switch, Xbox One and Xbox Series X/S over the following two years. The game puts the player in a cabin where a mysterious gamemaster makes them play a tabletop game.

Inscryption blends various genres, including deck-building, roguelike, turn-based strategy, escape room, puzzle and adventure, while drawing inspiration from, among others, tabletop role-playing games, board games, horror, vlogs, and found footage. Its presentation is a combination of computer animation, pixel art, drawn art, and live action, as well as first person, third-person and 2.5D perspectives. It provides no context nor backstory at its start; its cryptic, metafictional narrative must be put together from subsequent story elements and various optional clues. A real-world alternate reality game (ARG), embedded both in video from the game and outside of it, offers additional story elements via many easter eggs that must be decrypted.

The game originated as Sacrifices Must Be Made, a much shorter and simpler game made by Mullins in 2018 for a Ludum Dare game jam, which used a deck-building system in which the player had to kill their own creatures to summon others. After publishing the prototype to itch.io in December 2018, the positive response led Mullins to significantly expand on the original game, resulting in the making of Inscryption. The game received positive reviews upon release, winning several Game of the Year awards and selling 1 million copies by January 2022: its originality, card battle system, visuals and narrative were particularly praised, although changes in the later parts of the game received some criticism. A free expansion titled Kaycee's Mod, allowing players to focus on the tabletop game without Inscryption's various other elements, was released in March 2022.

== Gameplay ==
The player can choose which way to move on the map, which affects the next encounters.

Inscryption is a roguelike deck-building game. The game itself is broken into three acts, where the nature of this deck-building game changes, but the fundamental rules of how the card game is played remain the same. The card game is played on a 3x4 grid which is later expanded to a 3x5 grid during the third act; the player plays their cards into the bottom row, while their opponent plays cards ahead of time into the top row, which are automatically moved into play into the middle row on the next turn. Each card has an attack and health value. On either the player's or opponent's turn, after their cards are played, each of their cards attacks their opponent's card in the same column, dealing their attack value to that card's health. If that attack reduces the card's health to zero or less, that card is removed. If the attacking card is unopposed, then the card attacks the opponent directly with that much damage. Damage is tracked on a weighing scale, using teeth to represent each point of damage taken by that player. The goal is to tip the opponent's side of the scale by a difference of five teeth before they can do the same to the player's side. In addition to attack value, each card has various sigils representing special abilities such as the ability to fly past a blocker or to attack multiple columns each turn.

Each card has a cost to play, which depends on which of the Scrybes created that card. Those created by P03 use energy; the player starts with 1 energy at the start of each game, refilling all cells and gaining an additional cell each turn. Those created by Leshy require a blood sacrifice from cards already in play on the board. The cards from Grimora require bone tokens to play, earned when cards are defeated or sacrificed. Cards from Magnificus require one of three gems to be present on the board to be played and remain in the game, and are lost if the gem leaves play.

During the game's first act, in which Leshy has taken over the Inscryption code, the player sees the game from the first person perspective, facing against Leshy in his cabin, though this information is not told to the player. During this act, the game plays as a roguelike deck-building game, where the player is given a simple starting deck, based only on Leshy's and Grimora's card types. The game proceeds through four randomly generated maps through which the player charts a path, akin to the maps in Slay the Spire. The player's options include card battles with Leshy, opportunities to add or remove cards from their deck, or to gain consumable items that can be used during card battles to tip the odds in their favor. Each of the first three maps ends with a boss encounter, while the final map leads up to a battle with Leshy. If the player loses twice on a map, or once during a boss battle, they are taken by Leshy and made into a death card with his camera, which can appear on later runs. Between encounters, the player can also get up from the table and look around the cabin, solving puzzles similar to an escape room, discovering clues to locate the card forms of P03, Grimora, and Magnificus. Upon defeating Leshy, the game enters the second act.

During the second act, representing the original version of Inscryption, the game is presented as a pixel art-stylized top-down role-playing game, similar to Pokémon. The player is instructed to pick one of the four Scrybes to replace, and then must explore the game's overworld to collect card packs to expand their card collection, used to challenge each of the other four Scrybes and their various underlings in card battle. In this act, cards from all four Scrybes are available to collect, and decks can consist of cards from each of the four Scrybes. During this phase, the player can lose a card game without any penalty, simply not progressing the story. Once the player has defeated all four Scrybes within this act, the game moves into the third act after an unwinnable fight against P03.

The third act is similar in style to the first act as a roguelike deckbuilder, but now the player faces against P03 in a robot factory as it takes over the Inscryption code in an attempt to achieve "Transcendence" by publishing Inscryption on the Internet. P03 and its underlings have access to several of the death cards that the player may have created during prior runs of the first act, making battles in this phase more challenging. The player progresses through various encounters by moving through a series of rooms in a grid-like layout, similar to The Binding of Isaac, with battle encounters occurring between rooms, while other encounters to gain, improve or remove cards take place within the rooms themselves. While losing a card match in this act does not restart the game, it does reset the player to their last collected checkpoint, which is represented as antenna towers within the map.

== Plot ==
The game is presented as found footage recorded by Luke Carder, an internet content creator who specializes in collectible card games under the pseudonym "The Lucky Carder". Before the beginning of the game, Carder, while opening a pack of old, little-known out-of-print cards known as Inscryption, finds inside a set of handwritten coordinates indicating a location near his own. There, he finds, buried under the dirt in a forest, a box containing a floppy disk titled Inscryption. The disk turns out to be an Inscryption video game, although Carder cannot find any trace of its existence on the internet. He turns on the game, (Note: The real life Inscryption game begins at this point, with the player originally unaware that they are playing Carder as he plays the disk game. This part of the game is also technically found footage, as Carder records his playthrough, occasionally reacting vocally to its events; live action videos made available later in the game gradually reveal both Carder's backstory, and the fact that Inscryption's playable sections are all a game within a game with Carder as the player character.) but finds he cannot start a new game, and is instead forced to select the "Continue Game" option.

In-game, Carder's unnamed player character interacts with a shadowy dealer named Leshy within a cabin, where they must play a card-centric tabletop game with Leshy as gamemaster. Every time Carder loses, Leshy uses a magic camera to capture the character's soul into a "death card", and Carder restarts as another character. Between rounds, Carder's character can move about the cabin and solve puzzles to obtain various advantages in the tabletop game; they also find three sapient cards, the Stoat, the Stinkbug, and the Stunted Wolf, who work together with Carder's character to find a roll of film and beat Leshy's tabletop game. Upon their win, Carder's character steals the camera, uses the film roll to capture Leshy inside a card, and finds the previously missing "New Game" button. Upon acquiring it and selecting this new option, Carder is able to play the Inscryption disk game in its original form.

In its original form, the disk game is radically different from when Carder first started playing, although it revolves around a card system similar to the tabletop game's. It is set in a world ruled by the four "Scrybes": Leshy, the Scrybe of Beasts who had taken over the game in the save Carder originally used, P03, the Scrybe of Technology, Grimora, the Scrybe of the Dead, and Magnificus, the Scrybe of Magicks. P03, Grimora, and Magnificus were previously encountered as the Stoat, the Stinkbug, and the Stunted Wolf respectively, having been trapped into the Leshy-led version of the disk game and turned into cards. Carder's player character arrives in this world seeking to challenge the Scrybes; after defeating all four, they pick one Scrybe to challenge again in the hopes of taking their place, but P03 appears and fights the player regardless, using a glitch to defeat them and take over the game as Leshy did. Between play sessions, Carder, growing increasingly obsessed with the disk game, continues his investigation of its origins and contacts the publisher of the Inscryption cards, GameFuna; GameFuna denies the game's existence while also forcefully demanding its return, repeatedly sending a representative to reinforce the demand, whom Carder sends away. He also learns that a GameFuna developer, Kaycee Hobbes, mysteriously died by a fire related accident while working on the game, and notices that his camera is experiencing an increasingly large number of uncanny malfunctions. (Note: A Kaycee death card appears in the Leshy-led version of the game, while an NPC named Kaycee Hobbes featured in the disk game's "normal" and P03-led versions claims to have been named after one of the game's developers. Several optional story elements expand on Kaycee's key role in events prior to Carder's playthrough.)

Carder continues to play the disk game following P03's takeover, finding that the game has once again been radically altered: Carder's player character is now trapped in a factory, with P03 acting as gamemaster in a tabletop game of its own design, which emulates the game's original form, and in which the goal is to defeat four "Uberbots" to achieve "The Great Transcendence". Over time, P03 accesses elements from Carder's computer to use them in its tabletop game, such as using his Internet connection and accessing his files; (Note: In some of those occurrences, the game uses elements from the real life player's device; within Inscryption's setting, those elements are all from Carder's computer.) after the last Uberbot is defeated, P03, directly addressing Carder by name, reveals that its version of the game was all a ploy to gain access to Carder's computer and that The Great Transcendence is an upload of said version to a digital game storefront to spread it worldwide. Before the process completes, the other Scrybes appear and kill P03, aborting his plan. Grimora uses the opportunity to start a full wipe of the Inscryption disk, believing that the deletion of all of its contents, including the Scrybes themselves, is for the greater good. As the game is progressively wiped, each of the three Scrybes has a final card battle with Carder. First is Grimora, who justifies her actions for deleting the game and all its content. Carder then has one final game with Leshy back at the setting of the first act, where Leshy thanks him for a good game. Magnificus battles Carder while the game collapses and continues on until he is deleted. Despite having been warned by the disk game's characters not to, Carder opens an in-game ZIP file titled "OLD_DATA"; upon witnessing its contents, he panics and smashes the disk with a hammer. He contacts a journalist, trying to explain his story and claiming OLD_DATA would expose severe wrongdoing on the part of GameFuna, but is interrupted mid-call by the GameFuna representative who shoots him dead and enters his house to retrieve what remains of the Inscryption disk.

=== Alternate reality game ===
The alternate reality game (ARG) expands further on narrative elements hinted at in the main game via many cryptic easter eggs that must be decrypted, and led fans to receive floppy disks in real life by mail after ordering an unknown item on a website that could be found by decrypting the ARG easter eggs. The ARG notably reveals that Kaycee had acquired the "Karnoffel Code", a computer algorithm reportedly created by the Soviet Union during the Cold War after gaining possession of Adolf Hitler's corpse and discovering a connection between him, the game of Karnoffel, and the occult. A spy named Barry Wilkinson had gotten a copy of the Karnoffel Code from the Soviets and hid it on a floppy disc among other empty floppies, which eventually fell into the possession of Kaycee, leading to the video game that would later be found by Carder. Parts of the ARG point to narrative connections between Inscryption and Mullins' previous game, The Hex, with characters from The Hex helping P03 or GameFuna.

The clues from the ARG lead to a short live action video acting as an epilogue to the main game, which starts with the sound of Carder hitting the Inscryption floppy disk with a hammer at the end of the original game, before showing Carder's computer turning back on by itself and completing P03's upload of Inscryption. The video ends with a winking ASCII image of P03, revealing that it survived the wipe of the floppy disk by uploading itself onto Carder's computer and succeeded in achieving The Great Transcendence; this seemingly indicates that the real life Inscryption game made available worldwide online (and played by the real life player) was P03's cursed version all along.

== Development ==
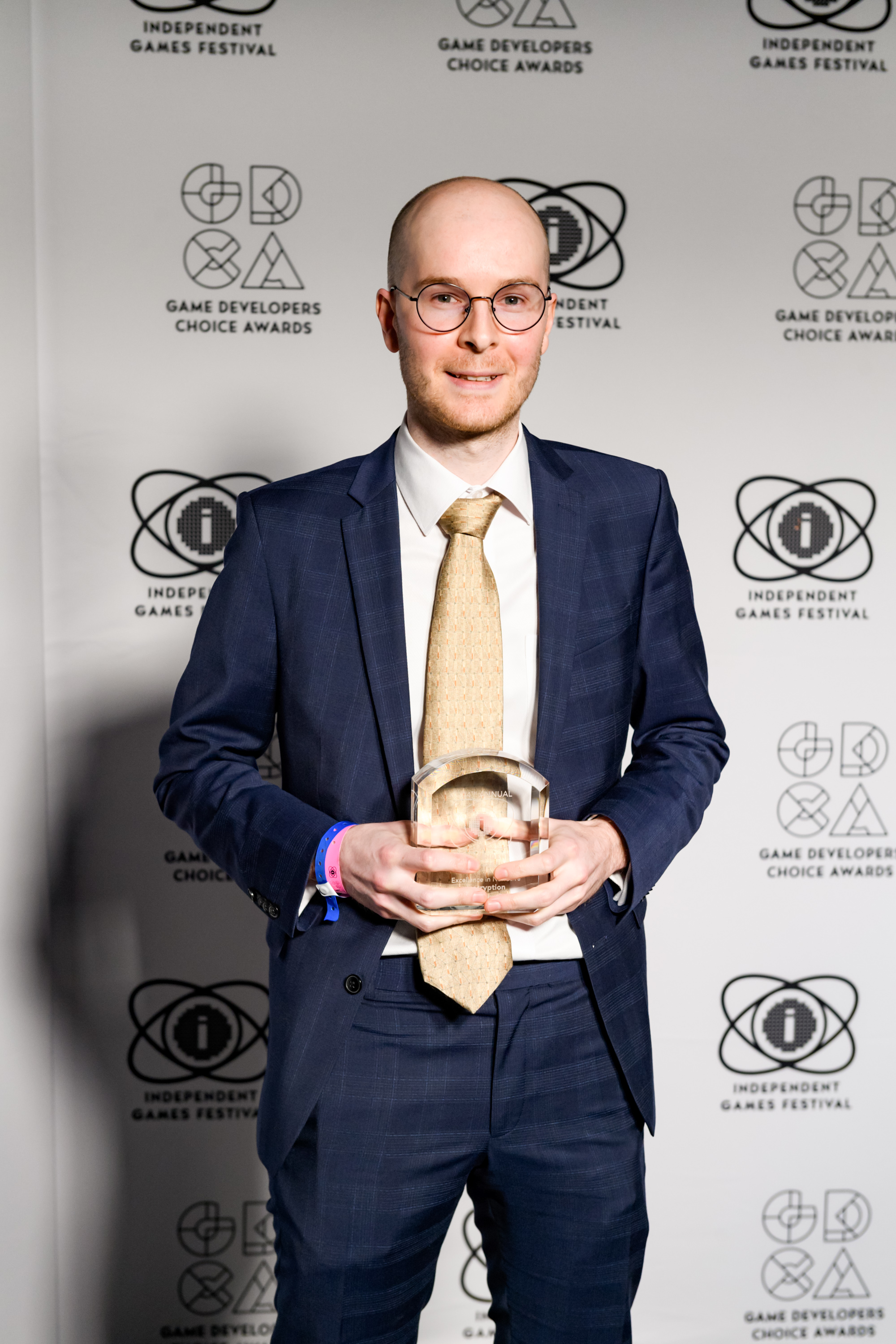
Daniel Mullins at the Game Developers Conference in 2022

The game started as a small project that Daniel Mullins built during the Ludum Dare 43 game jam in 2018, where the theme was "sacrifices must be made". At the time, Mullins had gotten back into Magic: The Gathering and took influence from the sacrifice mechanic there to create the approach where the player would sacrifice creatures to play other ones. This idea extended to the player virtually sacrificing parts of their own body as well to influence the game with negative effects that may come from that, such as sacrificing an eye that would limit their field of view. His entry to the game jam was thus named Sacrifices Must Be Made after the jam's theme. Following the game jam, Mullins put the game up for free on December 31, 2018, on itch.io, where it drew interest from players. As he had just finished releasing The Hex, Mullins decided to expand out Sacrifices Must Be Made into a full game. Initially, Mullins had considered expanding the game out into an anthology work as he did not immediately see a path for fleshing out the Ludum Dare version into a full game, but as he came up with ideas for this larger game, he saw a route to expand out the base game in multiple directions, including the incorporation of full-motion video.

Leshy is based on the entity of the same name in Slavic mythology. Mullins had considered that the dealer was a type of "forest demon" and while searching online, came across the mythos of Leshy, which he believed fit well with the horror theme of the game. From there, the other three Scrybes fell out as he had compared them to Pokémon gym leaders, each with a different theme; since Leshy was associated with beasts, the other three were associated with robots (P03), wizards (Magnificus), and the undead (Grimora). Mullins recognized that the game spends most of its time around Leshy and P03's stories, but felt that it would have made the game too long to include additional acts to explore Grimora's or Magnificus's backgrounds, although he made Grimora central to the game's conclusion.

Daniel Mullins Games released a free update in December 2021 that included a beta version of a mini-expansion to the game called "Kaycee's Mod". In this mode, the roguelike deck-building game from Act I can be played endlessly, with the player able to unlock new cards and starting abilities to take on more difficult challenges. The mini-expansion was released on March 17, 2022.

== Reception ==
Reception

Aggregate score
Aggregator	Score
Metacritic	PC: 85/100; PS5: 87/100

Review scores
Publication	Score
Destructoid	7.5/10
Eurogamer	Essential
Famitsu	34/40
Game Informer	9/10
GameSpot	8/10
Hardcore Gamer	4.5/5
IGN	9/10
PC Gamer (US)	69/100
Push Square	8/10

Inscryption received "generally favorable" reviews according to review aggregator website Metacritic.

Rock Paper Shotgun praised the scale mechanic, writing that, "You lose and gain momentum, deliver killer blows, claw back from a near-loss by being aggressive... It's a compelling twist". Destructoid liked the art style and the horror elements of the game, but criticized the later chapters' gameplay changes, stating, "Maybe it was a good idea to change things up before it had the chance to grow stale, it's just nothing gripped me as firmly as the first chapter." PC Gamer's Jody Macgregor liked the beginning of Inscryption, specifically praising how the world feels "off-kilter and grotesque", but criticized the later part of the game, saying "In its initial hours, Inscryption is an eerie delight full of mystery. That feeling fades long before it ends". Eurogamer enjoyed the visuals of the game, describing them as "a cursed reincarnation of something you'd play on a floppy disc in the '90s: a low fidelity-but-trying kind of adventure, but hijacked by some kind of evil and then twisted and gnarled by malevolence."

Inscryption was nominated for Best Indie Game and Best Sim/Strategy Game at The Game Awards 2021. Polygon named Inscryption their best game of 2021, while Time and Ars Technica listed Inscryption as one of their best games of 2021. In the 2021 Steam Awards, it was nominated for Most Innovative Gameplay. During the 25th Annual D.I.C.E. Awards, the Academy of Interactive Arts & Sciences nominated Inscryption for "Game of the Year", "Strategy/Simulation Game of the Year", and outstanding achievement for an "Independent Game", "Game Design", "Game Direction", and "Story". Inscryption won both the Game of the Year at the 22nd Game Developers Choice Awards and the Seumas McNally Grand Prize at the companion 2022 Independent Games Festival in addition to Excellence in Design, Narrative, and Audio; this is the first time a game won both top prizes. Inscryption had also been nominated for the Innovation Award for the Game Developers Choice Awards.

By January 2022, the game had sold more than one million copies and garnered a large following, with some community members having worked to physically replicate elements of Inscryption.

=== Awards and accolades ===
Award	Category	Result	Ref.
18th British Academy Games Awards	Best Game	Nominated	
18th British Academy Games Awards	Game Design	Won	
18th British Academy Games Awards	Original Property	Nominated	
25th Annual D.I.C.E. Awards	Game of the Year	Nominated	
25th Annual D.I.C.E. Awards	Strategy/Simulation Game of the Year	Nominated	
25th Annual D.I.C.E. Awards	Outstanding Achievement for an Independent Game	Nominated	
25th Annual D.I.C.E. Awards	Outstanding Achievement in Game Direction	Nominated	
25th Annual D.I.C.E. Awards	Outstanding Achievement in Game Design	Nominated	
25th Annual D.I.C.E. Awards	Outstanding Achievement in Story	Nominated	
The Game Awards 2021	Best Independent Game	Nominated	
The Game Awards 2021	Best Sim/Strategy Game	Nominated	
2021 SXSW Gaming Awards	Indie Game of the Year	Nominated	
2021 SXSW Gaming Awards	Excellence in Game Design	Won	
2021 SXSW Gaming Awards	Excellence in Audio Design	Nominated	
22nd Game Developers Choice Awards	Game of the Year	Won	
22nd Game Developers Choice Awards	Innovation Award	Nominated	
Independent Games Festival Awards	Seumas McNally Grand Prize	Won	
Independent Games Festival Awards	Excellence in Narrative	Won	
Independent Games Festival Awards	Excellence in Design	Won	
Independent Games Festival Awards	Excellence in Audio	Won	
