= 18th Game Developers Choice Awards =

2018 awards ceremony in California, US

- Date: March 21, 2018
- Venue: Moscone Center; San Francisco, California
- Hosted by: Robin Hunicke

Highlights
- Most awards: The Legend of Zelda: Breath of the Wild (3)
- Most nominations: The Legend of Zelda: Breath of the Wild and Horizon Zero Dawn (6)
- Lifetime Achievement Award: Tim Schafer
- Ambassador Award: Rami Ismail
- Game of the Year: The Legend of Zelda: Breath of the Wild

The 18th Game Developers Choice Awards was an award ceremony honoring outstanding achievements by game developers and video games released in 2017. The event took place on March 21, 2018, at the Moscone Center in San Francisco, California and was hosted by Robin Hunicke. It was held alongside the Independent Games Festival awards.

== Winners and nominees ==
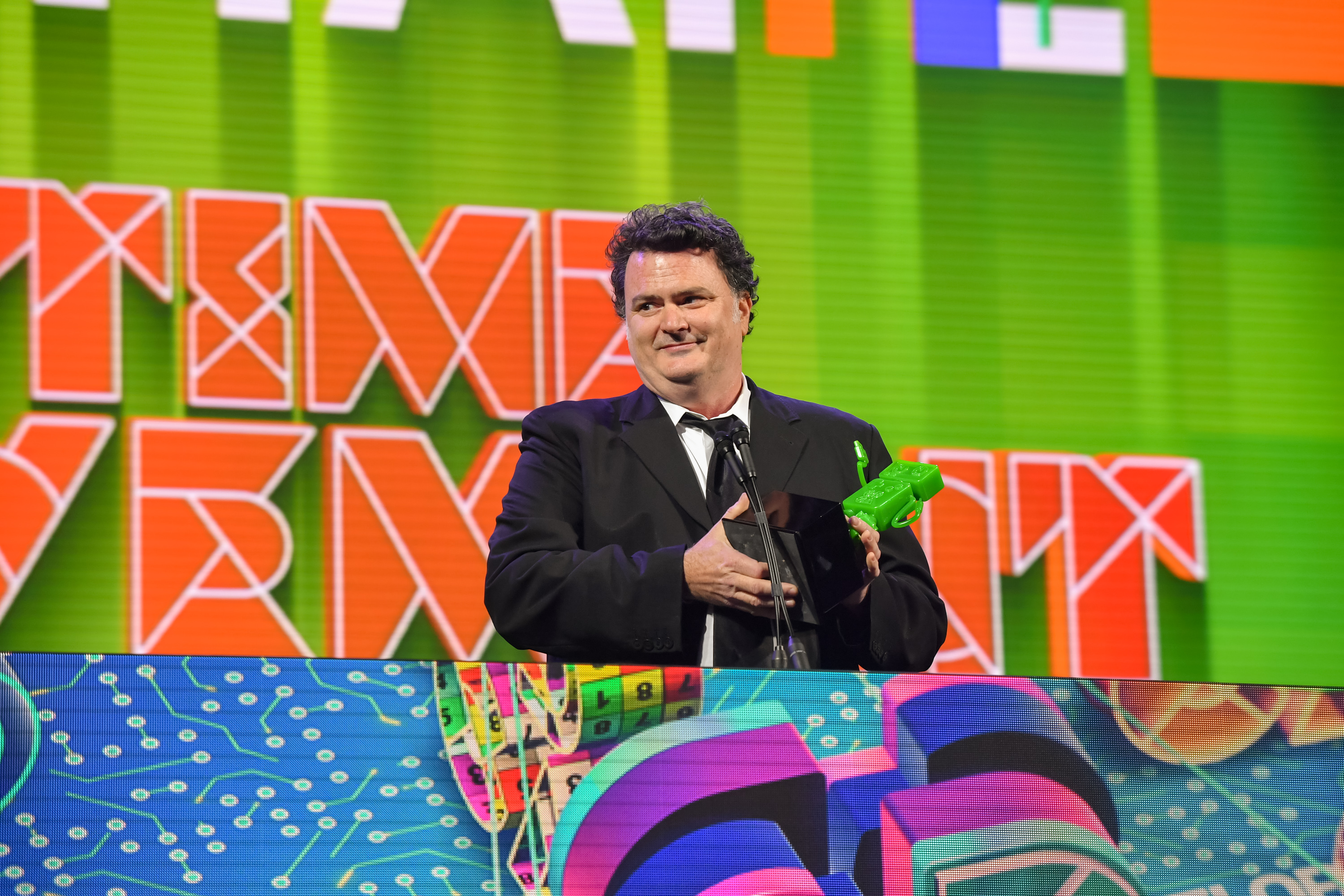
Tim Schafer won the Lifetime Achievement Award.

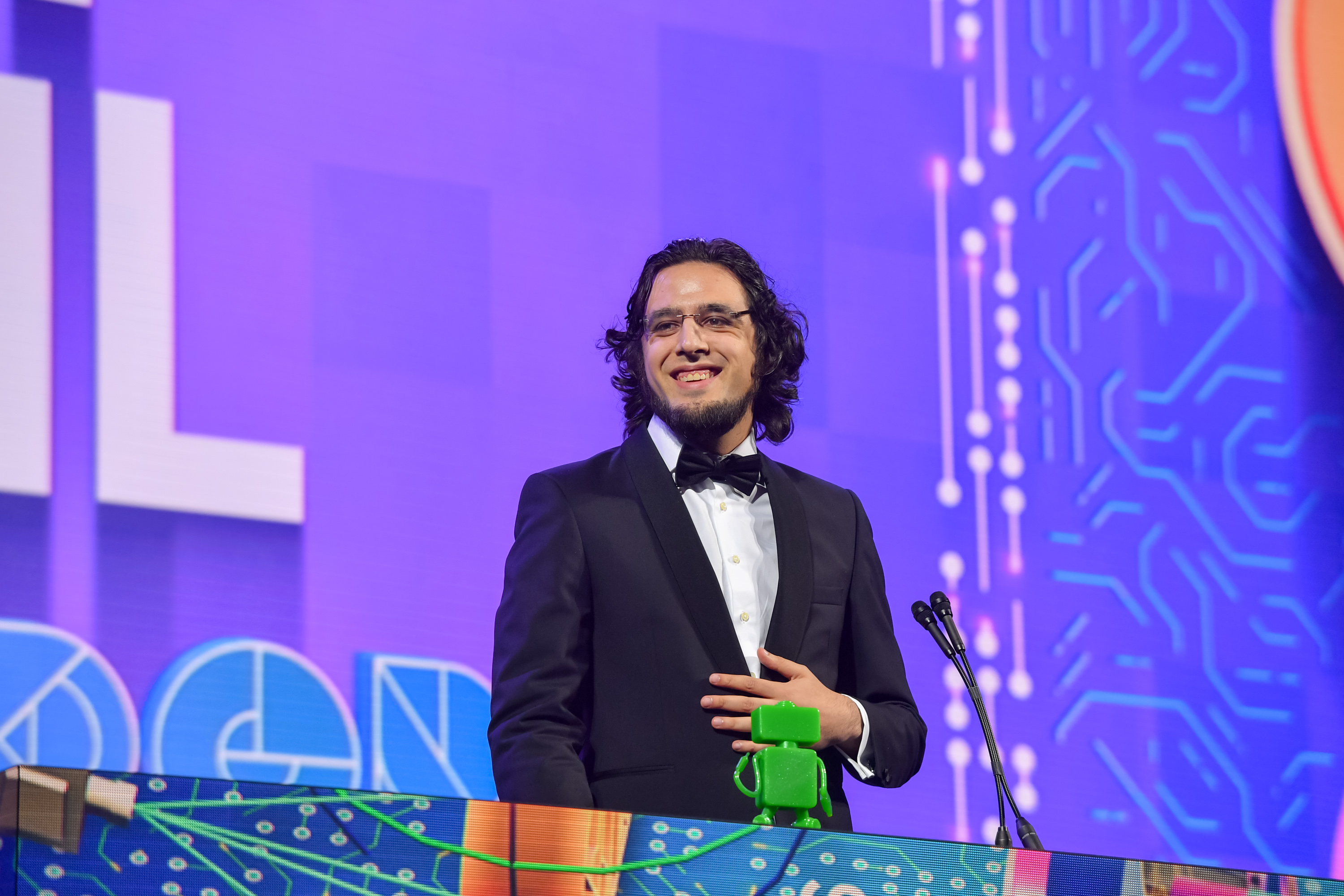
Rami Ismail won the Ambassador Award.

=== Game of the Year ===
- The Legend of Zelda: Breath of the Wild (Nintendo EPD/Nintendo)
  - Horizon Zero Dawn (Guerrilla Games/Sony Interactive Entertainment)
  - NieR: Automata (PlatinumGames/Square Enix)
  - PlayerUnknown's Battlegrounds (PUBG Studios)
  - Super Mario Odyssey (Nintendo EPD/Nintendo)

=== Best Audio ===
- The Legend of Zelda: Breath of the Wild (Nintendo EPD/Nintendo)
  - Cuphead (StudioMDHR)
  - Hellblade: Senua's Sacrifice (Ninja Theory)
  - Horizon Zero Dawn (Guerrilla Games/Sony Interactive Entertainment)
  - NieR: Automata (PlatinumGames/Square Enix)

=== Best Debut ===
- Cuphead (StudioMDHR)
  - Golf Story (Sidebar Games)
  - Gorogoa (Jason Roberts/Annapurna Interactive)
  - Hollow Knight (Team Cherry)
  - Night in the Woods (Infinite Fall/Finji)

=== Best Design ===
- The Legend of Zelda: Breath of the Wild (Nintendo EPD/Nintendo)
  - Horizon Zero Dawn (Guerrilla Games/Sony Interactive Entertainment)
  - NieR: Automata (PlatinumGames/Square Enix)
  - PlayerUnknown's Battlegrounds (PUBG Studios)
  - Super Mario Odyssey (Nintendo EPD/Nintendo)

=== Innovation Award ===
- Gorogoa (Jason Roberts/Annapurna Interactive)
  - Everything (David OReilly/Double Fine Productions)
  - The Legend of Zelda: Breath of the Wild (Nintendo EPD/Nintendo)
  - PlayerUnknown's Battlegrounds (PUBG Studios)
  - What Remains of Edith Finch (Giant Sparrow/Annapurna Interactive)

=== Best Mobile ===
- Gorogoa (Jason Roberts/Annapurna Interactive)
  - Bury Me, My Love (The Pixel Hunt/Arte France/Playdius)
  - Hidden Folks (Adriaan de Jongh and Sylvain Tegroeg)
  - Monument Valley 2 (Ustwo Games)
  - Reigns: Her Majesty (Nerial/Devolver Digital)

=== Best Narrative ===
- What Remains of Edith Finch (Giant Sparrow/Annapurna Interactive)
  - Hellblade: Senua's Sacrifice (Ninja Theory)
  - Horizon Zero Dawn (Guerrilla Games/Sony Interactive Entertainment)
  - Night in the Woods (Infinite Fall/Finji)
  - Wolfenstein II: The New Colossus (MachineGames/Bethesda Softworks)

=== Best Technology ===
- Horizon Zero Dawn (Guerrilla Games/Sony Interactive Entertainment)
  - Assassin's Creed: Origins (Ubisoft Montréal/Ubisoft)
  - Destiny 2 (Bungie/Activision)
  - Hellblade: Senua's Sacrifice (Ninja Theory)
  - The Legend of Zelda: Breath of the Wild (Nintendo EPD/Nintendo)

=== Best Visual Art ===
- Cuphead (StudioMDHR)
  - Horizon Zero Dawn (Guerrilla Games/Sony Interactive Entertainment)
  - The Legend of Zelda: Breath of the Wild (Nintendo EPD/Nintendo)
  - Night in the Woods (Infinite Fall/Finji)
  - Persona 5 (P-Studio/Atlus)

=== Best VR/AR Game ===
- Superhot VR (Superhot Team)
  - The Elder Scrolls V: Skyrim VR (Bethesda Game Studios/Bethesda Softworks)
  - Lone Echo (Ready at Dawn/Oculus Studios)
  - Resident Evil 7: Biohazard (Capcom)
  - Star Trek: Bridge Crew (Red Storm Entertainment/Ubisoft)

=== Audience Award ===
- NieR: Automata (PlatinumGames/Square Enix)

=== Lifetime Achievement Award ===
- Tim Schafer, video game designer known for Grim Fandango, Day of the Tentacle, The Secret of Monkey Island, among others

=== Ambassador Award ===
- Rami Ismail, co-founder of Vlambeer, which developed Ridiculous Fishing, Luftrausers, Nuclear Throne, among others
