= 17th Game Developers Choice Awards =

2017 awards ceremony in California, US

- Date: March 1, 2017
- Venue: Moscone Center; San Francisco, California
- Hosted by: Tim Schafer

Highlights
- Most awards: Firewatch, Inside, Overwatch (2)
- Most nominations: Inside (6)
- Lifetime Achievement Award: Tim Sweeney
- Ambassador Award: Mark DeLoura
- Pioneer Award: Jordan Mechner
- Game of the Year: Overwatch

The 17th Game Developers Choice Awards was an award ceremony honoring outstanding achievements by game developers and video games released in 2016. The event took place on March 1, 2017, at the Moscone Center in San Francisco, California during the 2017 Game Developers Conference and was hosted by Tim Schafer. It was held alongside the Independent Games Festival awards.

== Winners and nominees ==
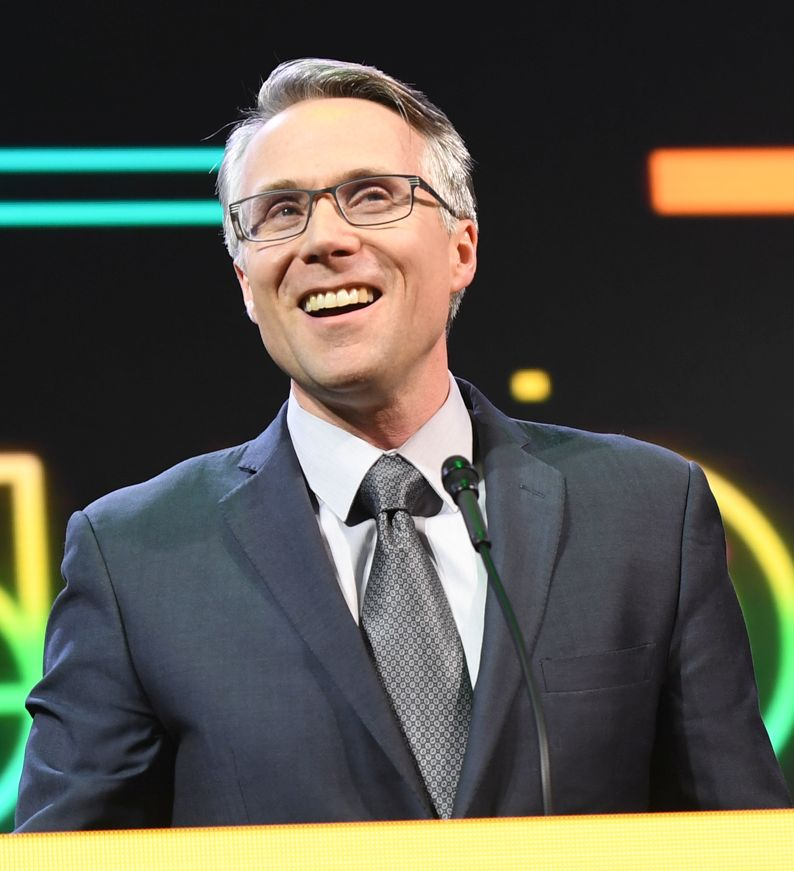
Mark DeLoura received the Ambassador Award.

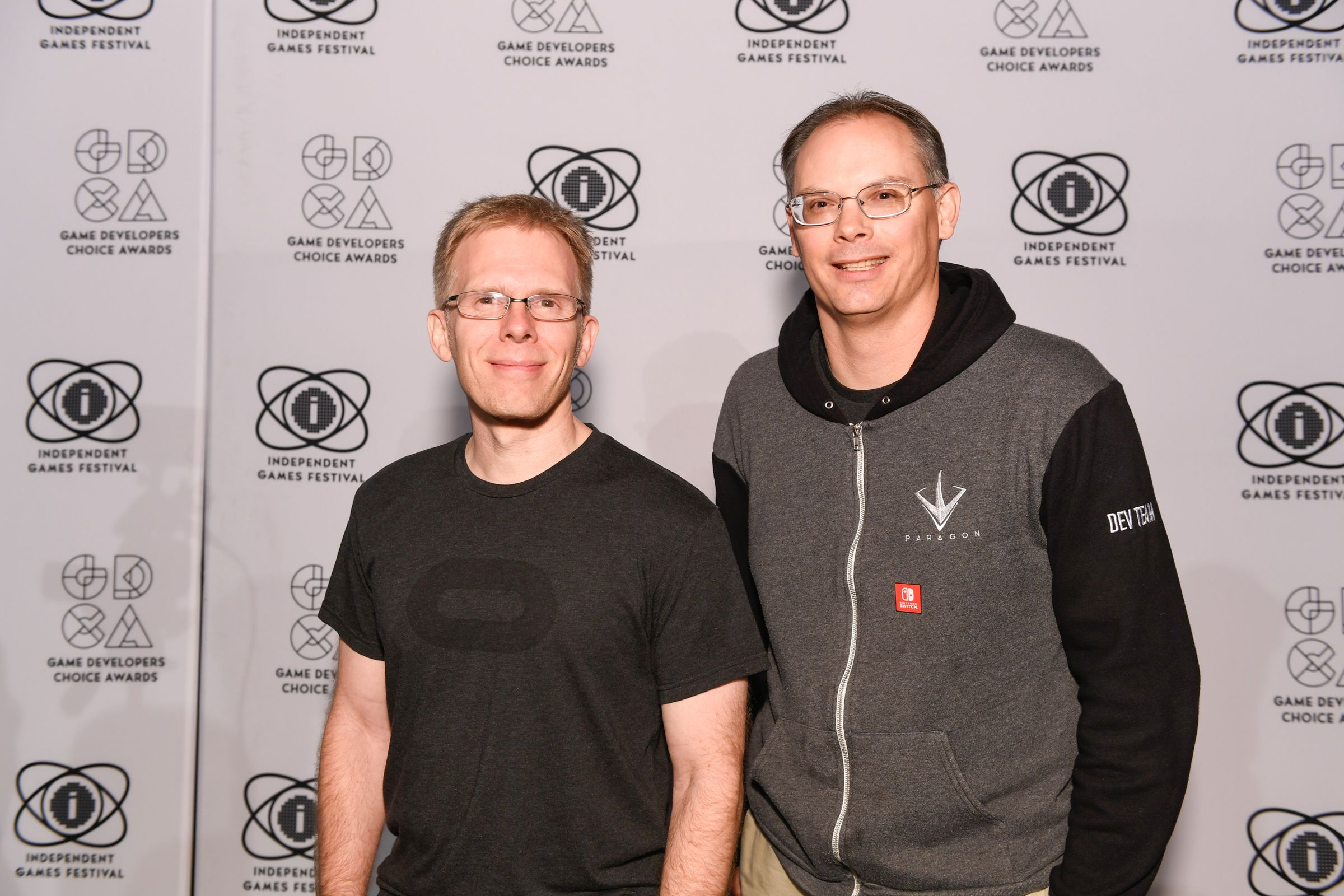
John Carmack (left) and Tim Sweeney (right) who won an award for his lifetime achievements.

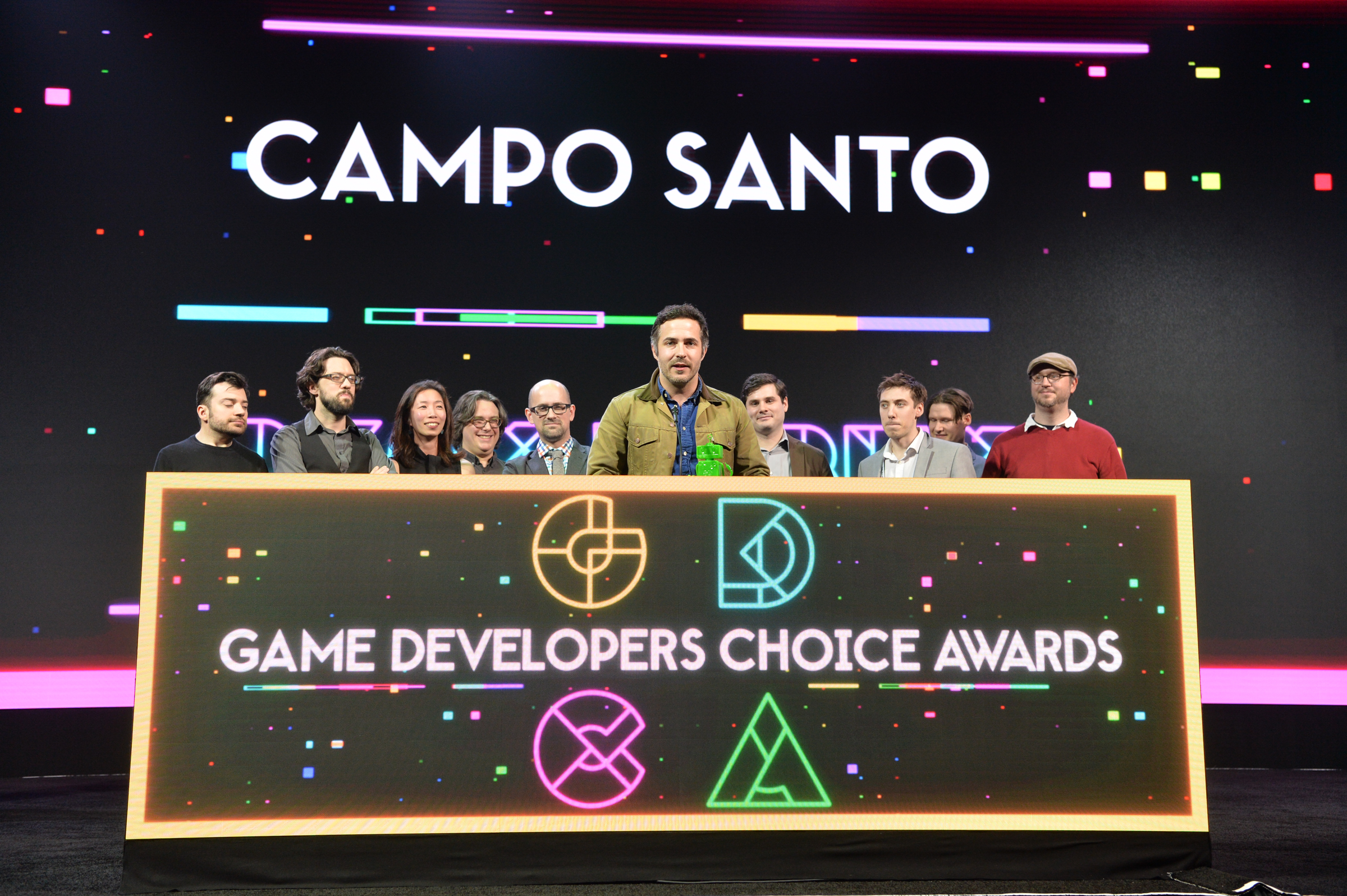
Campo Santo received two awards for their game Firewatch.

=== Game of the Year ===
- Overwatch (Blizzard Entertainment)
  - Dishonored 2 (Arkane Studios/Bethesda Softworks)
  - Firewatch (Campo Santo/Panic)
  - Inside (Playdead)
  - Uncharted 4: A Thief's End (Naughty Dog/Sony Interactive Entertainment)

=== Best Audio ===
- Inside (Playdead)
  - Battlefield 1 (EA DICE/Electronic Arts)
  - Doom (id Software/Bethesda Softworks)
  - Overwatch (Blizzard Entertainment)
  - Thumper (Drool)

=== Best Debut ===
- Firewatch (Campo Santo/Panic)
  - Hyper Light Drifter (Heart Machine)
  - Oxenfree (Night School Studio)
  - Stardew Valley (ConcernedApe)
  - Thumper (Drool)

=== Best Design ===
- Overwatch (Blizzard Entertainment)
  - Dishonored 2 (Arkane Studios/Bethesda Softworks)
  - Doom (id Software/Bethesda Softworks)
  - Inside (Playdead)
  - The Witness (Thekla)

=== Innovation Award ===
- No Man's Sky (Hello Games)
  - Firewatch (Campo Santo/Panic)
  - Inside (Playdead)
  - Pokémon Go (Niantic)
  - The Witness (Thekla)

=== Best Mobile/Handheld Game ===
- Pokémon Go (Niantic)
  - Clash Royale (Supercell)
  - Pokémon Sun and Moon (Game Freak/The Pokémon Company)
  - Reigns (Nerial/Devolver Digital)
  - Super Mario Run (Nintendo EPD/Nintendo)

=== Best Narrative ===
- Firewatch (Campo Santo/Panic)
  - Inside (Playdead)
  - The Last Guardian (Japan Studio/Sony Interactive Entertainment)
  - Oxenfree (Night School Studio)
  - Uncharted 4: A Thief's End (Naughty Dog/Sony Interactive Entertainment)

=== Best Technology ===
- Uncharted 4: A Thief's End (Naughty Dog/Sony Interactive Entertainment)
  - Battlefield 1 (EA DICE/Electronic Arts)
  - Doom (id Software/Bethesda Softworks)
  - No Man's Sky (Hello Games)
  - Overwatch (Blizzard Entertainment)

=== Best Visual Art ===
- Inside (Playdead)
  - Firewatch (Campo Santo/Panic)
  - The Last Guardian (Japan Studio/Sony Interactive Entertainment)
  - Overwatch (Blizzard Entertainment)
  - Uncharted 4: A Thief's End (Naughty Dog/Sony Interactive Entertainment)

=== Best VR/AR Game ===
- Job Simulator: The 2050 Archives (Owlchemy Labs)
  - Fantastic Contraption (Radial Games/Northway Games)
  - Pokémon Go (Niantic)
  - Rez Infinite (Monstars/Enhance Games)
  - Superhot VR (Superhot Team)

=== Audience Award ===
- Battlefield 1 (EA DICE/Electronic Arts)

=== Lifetime Achievement Award ===
- Tim Sweeney, founder and CEO of Epic Games

=== Ambassador Award ===
- Mark DeLoura

=== Pioneer Award ===
- Jordan Mechner, video game designer best known for his contributions to the Prince of Persia series
