= Laralyn McWilliams =

American video game designer (1965–2024)

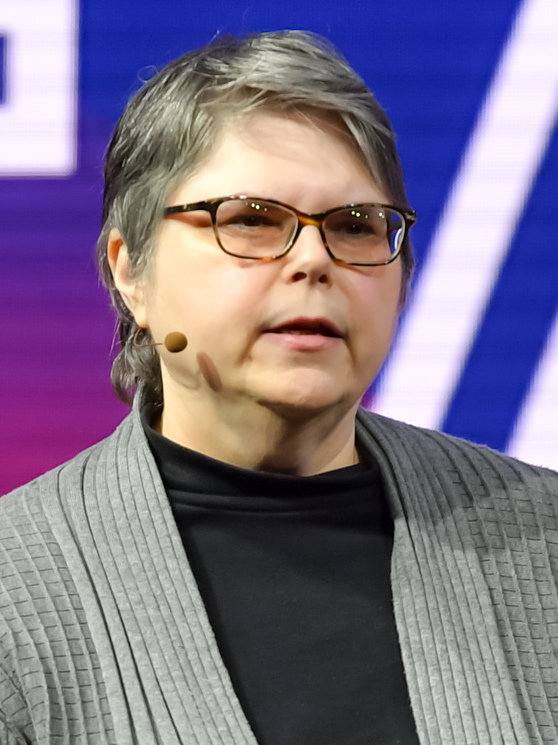
- McWilliams in 2019
- Born: 25 February 1965; Vicenza, Italy
- Died: 5 February 2024 (aged 58); Seattle, Washington, U.S.
- Occupation(s): Video game designer, Creative director, Video game director
- Partner: Charlie Hatley

Laralyn McWilliams (February 25, 1965 – February 5, 2024) was an American game designer and video game producer.

== Biography ==
Born in Vicenza, Italy, McWilliams spent her early years growing up in Italy before eventually relocating to the United States.

She began her career in game development as a beta tester, working on games such as The Elder Scrolls II: Daggerfall, Sid Meier's Pirates!, and Sid Meier's Alpha Centauri.

She was the creative director for Free Realms, a massively multiplayer virtual world for teens and tweens. In 2010, she was recognized by Massive Online Gaming as one of the most influential people in MMOs, sharing the #1 slot with Sony Online president John Smedley. Citing her role as spokesperson for Free Realms in addition to designer, Massive Online Gamer stated she was "instrumental in building awareness, visibility, and interest".

McWilliams was lead designer, producer or game director for games for Disney and DreamWorks. She was also lead designer for Full Spectrum Warrior at Pandemic Studios, and worked with John Singleton and Snoop Dogg on the canceled game Fear & Respect.

McWilliams was listed as one of the Top Women in MMOs in 2010, and was also one of the Gamasutra 20 for Women in Games. She wrote a post-mortem of Free Realms that was published in the April 2010 Game Developer Magazine.

McWilliams had an A.B. in psychology from Vassar College and a J.D. from St. Louis University School of Law.

In 2021, her legacy in the game industry was recognized by her peers with a Lifetime Achievement Award at the 21st Game Developers Choice Awards, which recognizes the career and achievements of a developer who has made an indelible impact on the craft of game development and games as a whole.

McWilliams died of complications from heart surgery in Seattle, Washington on February 5, 2024, at the age of 58.

== Game credits ==
McWilliams' game credits are partially listed on the site MobyGames.

- Free Realms (2009), Sony Online Entertainment Inc.
- Over the Hedge (2006), Activision Publishing, Inc.
- Full Spectrum Warrior (2004), THQ Inc.
- Sid Meier's Pirates! (2004), Atari, Inc.
- Disney's Stitch: Experiment 626 (2002), Buena Vista Games, Inc.
- Sid Meier's Alpha Centauri (1999), Electronic Arts, Inc.
- The Elder Scrolls: Daggerfall (1996), Bethesda Softworks LLC
