= Kelly Perine =

American actor (born 1969)

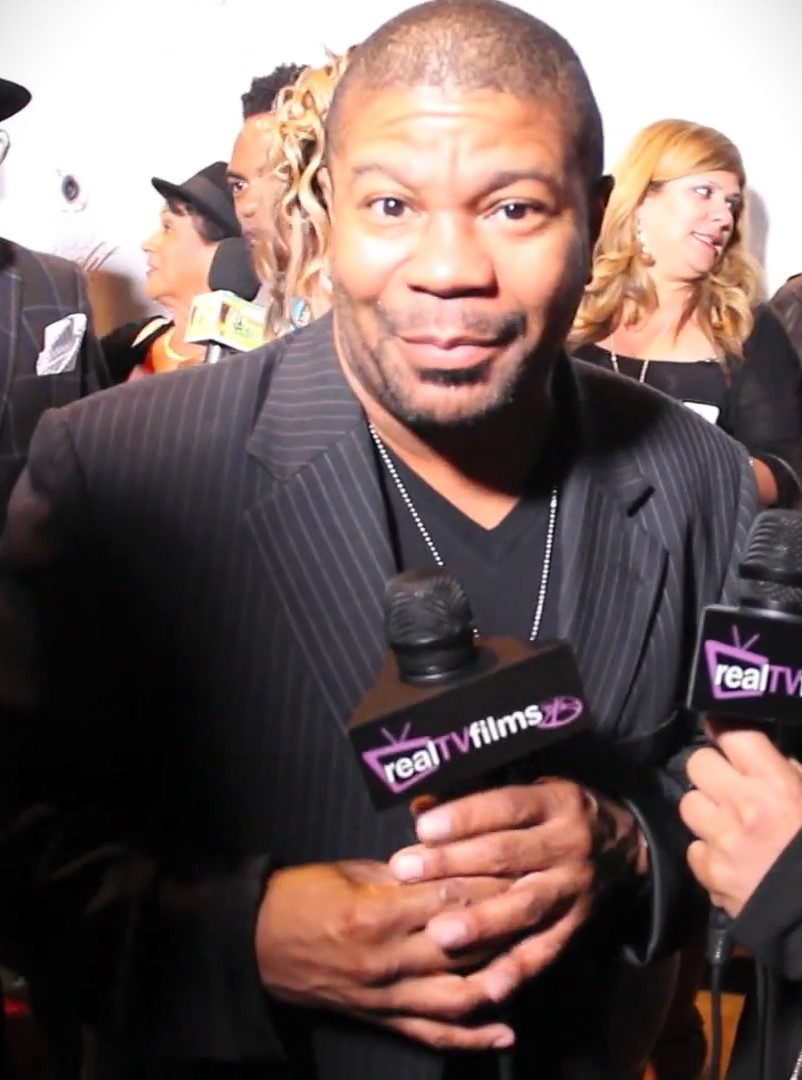
- Perine in 2016
- Born: March 23, 1969 (age 57); State College, Pennsylvania, United States
- Education: Pomona College, University of California - Irvine
- Occupations: Actor, writer, director, comedian
- Years active: 1990–present
- Height: 5 ft 6 in (168 cm)
- Website: www.kellyperine.com

Kelly Perine (born March 23, 1969) is an American television actor, writer, director, producer, and comedian.

== Early life and education ==
Perine attended Lake Forest Academy, near Chicago, Illinois, where he studied stage acting. He spent his undergraduate years at Pomona College in Claremont, California, majoring in film studies, where he graduated in 1991. After graduating, he studied at the University of California, Irvine, where he received his master's degree in Drama seven years later.

== Career ==
Perine had regular roles in Between Brothers as weatherman Dustin "Dusty" Q. Canyon, Kelly Peterson on the fifth and final season of The Parent 'Hood, and used car salesman Duane Odell Knox in One on One from seasons 1 to 4, not returning for season 5. He starred in the MyNetworkTV comedy Under One Roof (2008−09), where he played Winston Hill opposite Flavor Flav.

His film work includes portraying Kurt in the comedy Trial and Error (1997) and Keene in the horror film Bram Stoker's Legend of the Mummy (1998). Perine has also made appearances in numerous independent films, like Convincing Clooney, where he played the role of Disco.

During the 2010s, Perine began acting in several Nickelodeon productions, as Uncle Charlie in Christmas film Santa Hunters and the recurring role of Principal Platt on short-lived comedic series Legendary Dudas. He then portrayed Sir Gareth in the series Knight Squad. Perine is currently in pre-production for the feature film Downward Hiro, which he wrote and is starring in. The film is based on the award-winning short of the same name, which won a number of festival awards. He has also penned a baseball comedy called Run Down Mongoose, which follows a washed-up Dodger scout who travels to the Dominican Republic to sign an up-and-coming player.

Perine also has a number of unscripted shows, such as From Scratch and Finish the Fridge, which are travel/lifestyle shows. He has appeared in many television commercials and has had bit parts in numerous sitcoms, including 21 Jump Street, Seinfeld, The Drew Carey Show, Coach, Mad About You, Living Single, Hangin' with Mr. Cooper, Malcolm & Eddie, The Steve Harvey Show, The Hughleys, How I Met Your Mother, True Jackson, VP, Austin & Ally, and The Bernie Mac Show.

== Filmography ==
=== Film ===
| Year | Title | Role | Notes |
|---|---|---|---|
| 1993 | The Making of'...And God Spoke | Wiseman #2 | |
| 1996 | Sunchaser | Fellow in Oncology | |
| 1996 | Judge and Jury | Roland | |
| 1996 | Dead Wrong | - | Short |
| 1997 | Trial and Error | Kurt | |
| 1997 | Pale in Your Shadow | Robert | Short |
| 1998 | Bram Stoker's Legend of the Mummy | Keene | |
| 2000 | Alien Fury: Countdown to Invasion | Jack the Realitor | TV movie |
| 2003 | Law of the Fist | Blade | Short |
| 2003 | African-American Idol: The Search for the Next Black Leader | Preacher | Short |
| 2004 | Gas | Ed | |
| 2005 | Dating Games People Play | Manny | |
| 2007 | Adventures of Johnny Tao | Lenny | Video |
| 2007 | Totally Baked: A Pot-U-Mentary | Skip | |
| 2007 | Leo | Himself | Short |
| 2008 | Dog Gone | Arty | |
| 2009 | Go! | Chuck | Short |
| 2010 | Wipe | Fillmore Franklin | Short |
| 2010 | Speed Dating | Dee Jay | |
| 2011 | The Elevator | Kevin | Short |
| 2011 | One Way Street | Employee | Short |
| 2011 | Convincing Clooney | Disco | |
| 2011 | Naked Angel | Homeless Musician | |
| 2011 | A Perfect Day | - | Short |
| 2012 | Atlas Shrugged Part II | Airport Manager | |
| 2012 | Trying | Dr. Ted | Short |
| 2012 | Side Effects | Bart | Short |
| 2013 | The Devon Taylor Show | Burt Jones | TV movie |
| 2013 | Thousands | Collin | Short |
| 2013 | Please Return | David | Short |
| 2014 | The Wedding Pact | Dave Breem | |
| 2014 | Santa Hunters | Uncle Charlie | TV movie |
| 2015 | Marathon Day | Kevin | Short |
| 2015 | Reservations for Three | Peter | Short |
| 2015 | Nickelodeon's Ho Ho Holiday Special | Tinsel | TV movie |
| 2016 | Serial Dater | Chef Forrestor | |
| 2016 | A Weekend with the Family | Vagabond | |
| 2016 | Killer Defense | Miguel Garcia | Short |
| 2016 | Downward Hiro | Hiro | Short |
| 2016 | Candace and Peter's Smokin' Hot Date | Peter | Short |
| 2016 | Boy Bye | Hector | |
| 2017 | The Babymoon | Sheriff | |
| 2017 | FuN? | Max | Short |
| 2017 | Nickelodeon's Sizzling Summer Camp Special | Tinsel | TV movie |
| 2017 | Question 50 | George | Short |
| 2018 | Sensitive Men | Chris | Short |
| 2018 | Is You Is My Baby? | Peter | Short |
| 2019 | Manipulation | Scott Keating | |
| 2020 | The Weight of Perfection | Frank | Short |
| 2021 | Misophonia | The Exterminator | Short |
| 2022 | The Baby Pact | Dave Breem | |
| 2022 | The Shortlist: Gutterball | Garrett | Short |
| 2023 | No Way Out | Monte | |
| 2023 | Animus | Dr. Parrish | Short |
| 2024 | Sensitive Men | Chris | Short |

=== Television ===
| Year | Title | Role | Notes |
|---|---|---|---|
| 1990 | 21 Jump Street | Holt | Episode: "Blackout" |
| 1994 | Mad About You | Man in Line | Episode: "The City" |
| 1995 | Living Single | Rusty Biggins | Episode: "Who's Scooping Who?" |
| 1995 | Seinfeld | John | Episode: "The Postponement" |
| 1995 | Misery Loves Company | Roger | Episode: "Pilot" |
| 1995 | Night Stand with Dick Dietrick | Andy | Episode: "Mama's Boys" |
| 1995–1997 | Hangin' with Mr. Cooper | Mr. Morley | Guest: Season 3, Recurring Cast: Seasons 4–5 |
| 1995–2000 | The Drew Carey Show | Chuck | Recurring Cast: Seasons 1–4, Guest: Season 5 |
| 1996 | The Parent 'Hood | Accomplice | Episode: "The Parade-y Bunch" |
| 1996–1997 | Ned and Stacey | Thad | Episode: "Loganberry's Run" & "I Like Your Moxie" |
| 1997 | ER | Matt Collins | Episode: "Fortune's Fools" |
| 1997 | High Incident | Chris | Episode: "Excessive Force" |
| 1997 | Tracey Takes On... | Minty Fresh | Episode: "Race Relations" |
| 1997 | Coach | Frank | Episode: "The Neighbor Hood" |
| 1997 | Family Matters | Petey | Episode: "A Pirate's Life for Me" |
| 1997 | The Practice | Theodore "Teddy" Maynard | Episode: "Dog Bite" |
| 1997 | Malcolm & Eddie | Calloway | Episode: "Whole Lotta Love Seat" |
| 1997–1999 | Between Brothers | Dustin "Dusty" Canyon | Main Cast |
| 1999 | The Parent 'Hood | Kelly Peterson | Main Cast: Season 5 |
| 1999 | Malcolm & Eddie | Nick Nickerson | Episode: "Hot Pants" |
| 1999–2002 | For Your Love | Paul | Recurring Cast: Seasons 2–3 & 5 |
| 2000 | The Steve Harvey Show | Patient | Episode: "Player, Interrupted" |
| 2000–2001 | Providence | Reggie | Recurring Cast: Season 3, Guest: Season 4 |
| 2001 | The Hughleys | Brock | Episode: "Something About Shari" |
| 2001 | The Bernie Mac Show | Matt | Episode: "Pilot" |
| 2001–2005 | One on One | Duane Knox | Main Cast: Seasons 1–4 |
| 2002 | The Twilight Zone | Cam the Jumpsuit Guy | Episode: "Gabe's Story" |
| 2005 | Cuts | Duane Knox | Episode: "On the Road Again" |
| 2007 | How I Met Your Mother | Fred | Episode: "Lucky Penny" |
| 2007 | In Case of Emergency | Don Piano | Episode: "The Picture" |
| 2007 | The Loop | Agent Beckman | Episode: "Yeah, Presents" |
| 2008 | Just Jordan | Kenny | Episode: "Let Sleeping Dogs Lie" |
| 2008–2009 | Under One Roof | Winston Hill | Main Cast |
| 2009 | True Jackson, VP | True's Father | Episode: "Back to School" |
| 2010 | 'Til Death | Doctor | Episode: "Ally Aboard" |
| 2011 | Are We There Yet? | Steve | Episode: "The Play Dates Episodes" |
| 2011 | Who Is Billie Mackenzie | Dr. Underwood | Episode: "Meet the Underwoods" |
| 2012 | Austin & Ally | Officer Dunphy | Episode: "Songwriting and Starfish" |
| 2012 | Bones | Walter Otton | Episode: "The Bump in the Road" |
| 2012–2014 | Let's Stay Together | Dr. Earl Sutton | Guest Cast: Season 2 & 4 |
| 2013 | The Thundermans | Math Teacher | Episode: "Report Card" |
| 2013 | The Rev | Larry Lipshitz | Recurring Cast |
| 2014 | The Crazy Ones | Calvin | Episode: "Dead and Improved" |
| 2014 | Love That Girl! | Clyde | Episode: "Mo' Money, Mo' Problems" |
| 2014 | Crash & Bernstein | Officer Plotkin | Episode: "Monkey Business" |
| 2014 | Family Time | Larry | Episode: "Powering Down" & "Cut It Out" |
| 2014–2015 | Dog with a Blog | Principal Lawson | Episode: "Guess Who Gets Expelled?" & "Guess Who's a Cheater" |
| 2015 | First Mind Presents: Short Films | God (voice) | Episode: "The End of the Date" |
| 2015 | Suburban Sons | Steve | Main Cast |
| 2015–2018 | Hopefuls | Coach Zabar | Recurring Cast |
| 2016 | Heartbeat | - | Episode: "The Land of Normal" |
| 2016 | Legendary Dudas | Principal Platt | Recurring Cast |
| 2017 | Beauty and the Baller | Jae Kwame Malt | Episode: "Episode #1.6" & "#1.7" |
| 2017 | Ghostbusters: Station 6 | Marion Pascal | Episode: "Pilot" |
| 2018 | School of Rock | Mr. McKlusky | Episode: "We Gotta Get Out of This Place" |
| 2018 | Alex, Inc. | Marion | Episode: "The Butterfly Pavilion" |
| 2018 | Here's the Thing | Kevin | Episode: "Regrets Only" & "Afterparty" |
| 2018–2019 | Knight Squad | Sir Gareth | Main Cast |
| 2019 | Coop & Cami Ask the World | Nick | Episode: "Would You Wrather Lose Your Presents?" |
| 2021 | Family Reunion | Langston | Episode: "Remember When M'Dear Changed History?" |
| 2022 | Side Hustle | Peterson | Episode: "Yesley Day" |
| 2025 | The Neighborhood | Ted | Episode: "Welcome to the Signature Service Loyalty Rewards Program" |
| 2025 | Vampirina: Teenage Vampire | Eugene | Episode: "First Heartbeat" |
