= Pinocchio: A True Story =

2021 Russian animated film

- Theatrical release poster
- Directed by: Vasiliy Rovenskiy
- Written by: Maksim Sveshnikov; Vadim Sveshnikov; Vasiliy Rovenskiy
- Story by: Vasiliy Rovenskiy
- Based on: The Adventures of Pinocchio by Carlo Collodi
- Produced by: Roman Borisevich; Vasily Rovenskiy; Maxim Rogalskiy
- Starring: Filipp Lebedev; Anton Eldarov; Aleksandr Gavrilin; Diomid Vinogradov; Dmitriy Iosifov; Aleksey Voytyuk; Eliza Martirosova; Irina Kireyeva; Vitaliy Loyko
- Edited by: Edaurd Nuritdinov
- Music by: Anton Gryzlov
- Layouts by: Azat Gazizov; Evgeniy Palchikov
- Production companies: Licensing Brands LLC; Cinema Fund Russia
- Distributed by: Sony Pictures Releasing CIS
- Release dates: December 23, 2021 (UAE); February 17, 2022 (Russia)
- Running time: 94 minutes
- Country: Russia
- Language: Russian
- Box office: $833,012

Pinocchio: A True Story (Russian: Пиноккио. Правдивая история, romanized: Pinokkio. Pravdivaya istoriya) is a 2021 Russian animated fantasy film directed by Vasiliy Rovenskiy and adapted from Italian novel The Adventures of Pinocchio by Carlo Collodi. The film was released in Russia by the local division of Sony Pictures Releasing on 17 February 2022.

An English dub was released in the United States by Lionsgate Home Entertainment on 22 March 2022 straight-to-DVD. The dub featured Pauly Shore as Pinocchio, whose voice acting became a viral meme on Twitter and TikTok when a clip from the trailer gained traction. Despite this, the film was heavily panned.

== Plot ==
An inventor named Geppetto creates a wooden puppet named Pinocchio, who is blessed by the fairy Lucilda to be able to talk and move like a human. Pinocchio wishes to see the world but is forced to live in hiding with Geppetto since he is the only talking puppet in the world.

After hearing a commotion, Pinocchio and his talking horse Tybalt rescue a girl named Bella whose carriage had lost control. Bella is an acrobat with a circus run by Mangiafuoco, a strict businessman. Mangiafuoco recruits Pinocchio to join the circus with Tybalt as his talent agent. Pinocchio quickly becomes the star attraction along with Bella, with whom he falls in love with. After Bella rejects him, Pinocchio seeks to become a real boy. He learns from a clown that the fairy Lucilda has the power to make him real. Pinocchio and Tybalt travel to find Lucilda, narrowly escaping being robbed by Mangiafuoco's accomplices. Lucilda states that she cannot turn Pinocchio human and that he is human by acting human, despite being made of wood. Pinocchio and Tybalt return to the circus.

On the way, a detective investigating a series of crimes arrests Pinocchio. While the circus is performing, Mangiafuoco's accomplices have been stealing from the (vacant) homes of the audience. The detective accuses Pinocchio of being the mastermind behind these crimes. Tybalt saves Pinocchio, who travels to the circus to warn Bella of Mangiafuoco's crimes. Pinocchio is captured and caged by Mangiafuoco, who tries to force Pinocchio to perform. After hatching a plan with Bella, Geppetto, and Tybalt, they agree to put on one more performance, in which they reveal to the audience that Mangiafuoco is a criminal. Enraged, Mangiafuoco lights the circus tent on fire. Bella is trapped inside and Pinocchio saves her, getting trapped in the burning tent.

Pinocchio's body is carried out of the fire. Bella, seeing him apparently dead, cries over his body. One of her tears transforms Pinocchio into a human and brings him back to life. Lucilda appears and states that, by sacrificing himself for someone else, Pinocchio has proven that he is human. The detective arrests Mangiafuoco and his accomplices. Upon noticing that the detective and Bella share the same monogrammed handkerchief, they realize that Bella is the detective's long-lost daughter who was kidnapped eleven years ago. The remaining circus performers, Tybalt, Pinocchio, and Bella start a new traveling circus, with the detective as the new ringleader.

== Cast ==
Pinocchio: A True Story cast
Character	Russian	English	
Character	Russian	International	U.S. re-dub
Pinocchio	Filipp Lebedev	Jordan Worsley	Pauly Shore
Tibalt	Diomid Vinogradov	Daniel Medvedev	Jon Heder
Gepetto	Anton Eldarov	Jonathan Salway	Tom Kenny
Bella	Eliza Martirosova	Liza Klimova	Liza Klimova
Brioni	Diomid Vinogradov	David Grout	David Grout
Mangiafuoco	Dmitriy Iosifov	Bernard Jacobsen	Bernard Jacobsen
Cat	Diomid Vinogradov	Andrei Kurganov	Andrei Kurganov
Fox	Aleksandr Gavrilin	Stephen Ochner	Stephen Ochner
Fantozzi	Aleksey Voytyuk	Andrew Winn	Andrew Winn
Caro Parrot	Diomid Vinogradov	Stephen Ochner	Stephen Ochner
Lyusilda	Irina Kireyeva	Kate Lann	Kate Lann
Bolognese Brothers	Diomid Vinogradov	—N/a	—N/a
Carbonara	Diomid Vinogradov	—N/a	—N/a
Policeman	Vitaliy Loyko	—N/a	—N/a

== Production ==
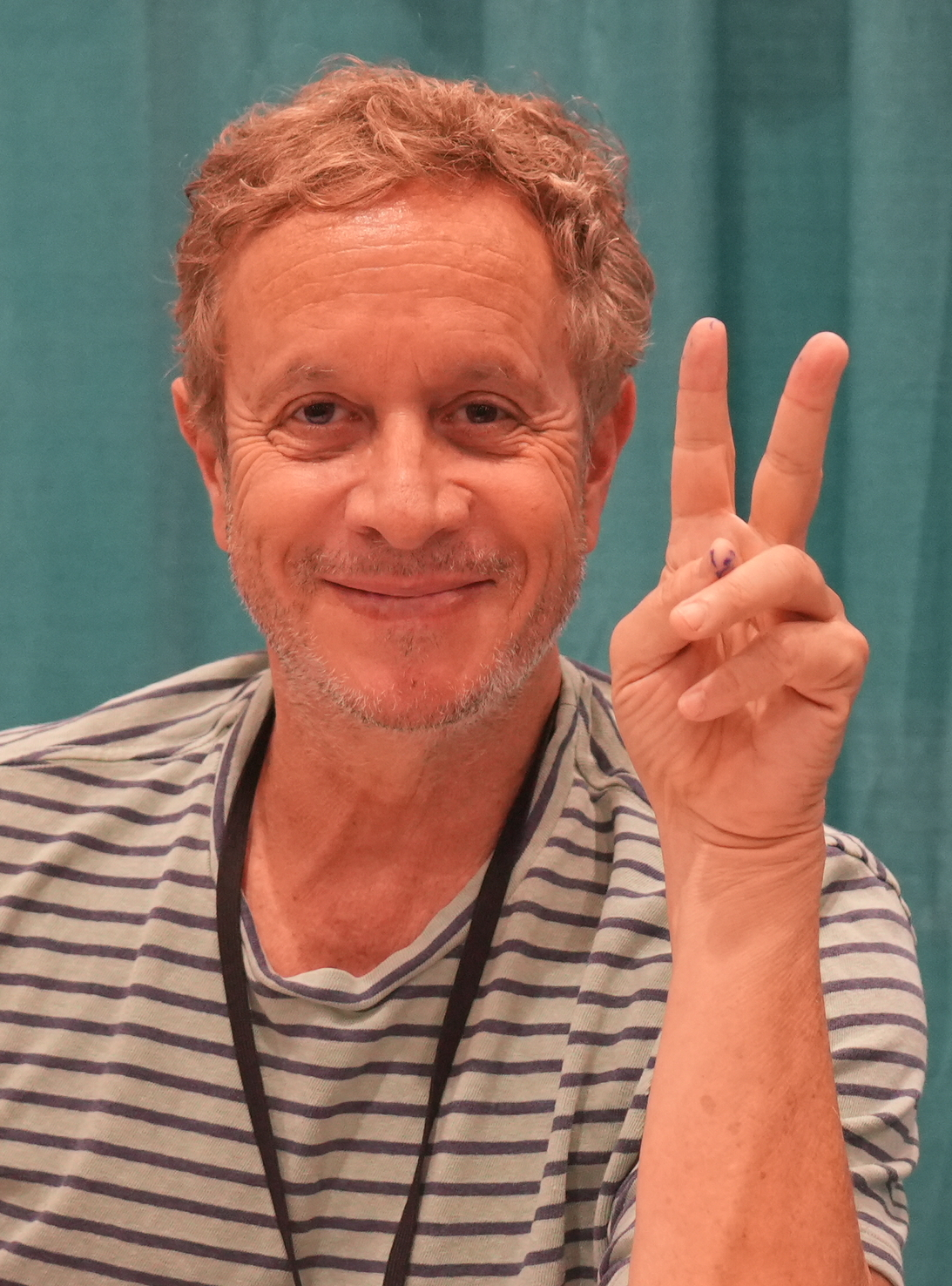
Pauly Shore voices Pinocchio in the English dub of Pinocchio: A True Story; his performance became an Internet meme

Pinocchio: A True Story was directed by Vasiliy Rovenskiy and produced by him with Roman Borisevich and Maxim Rogalsky. The film was released in theaters in Russia by Sony Pictures on 17 February 2022. In November 2021, its North American rights were acquired by Grindstone Entertainment.

In late January 2022, Lionsgate Films released a trailer for the film's English dub, featuring Pauly Shore as Pinocchio. Shore had previously worked with Lionsgate on the English dub of the Russian animated film My Sweet Monster and recorded his voice lines for Pinocchio: A True Story in December 2021. The dub became a prominent Internet meme when a clip of Pinocchio saying, "Father, when can I leave to be on my own? I've got the whole world to see," went viral on TikTok and Twitter. Users on those sites perceived an exaggerated, effeminate undertone in Shore's delivery of the line. Lionsgate reposted the clip on their own TikTok account and captioned it "the yassification of Pinocchio", while Shore posted a video of himself lip-syncing to the dub on TikTok. For Rolling Stone, EJ Dickson wrote that Shore's voice acting in the film made him a "Gen-Z TikTok LGBTQ icon". Joshua Kristian McCoy of Game Rant wrote that the trailer became "the target of a truly apocalyptic amount of ridicule" because of Shore's "wooden" performance.

The English dub was released by Lionsgate through their Grindstone Entertainment Group label on 22 March 2022 on DVD and on video on demand on Amazon Prime Video and iTunes. Following the film's release, users on Twitter dubbed Shore's version of the character "fruity Pinocchio" because of Shore's "classic drawn-out vowels and sarcastic-sounding voice" and shared other clips from the film that went viral. The film's English dub was also released on 21 April 2022 in theaters in New Zealand.

== Critical reception ==
In a review for Common Sense Media, Jennifer Borget wrote in a three-star review that Pinocchio: A True Story had a simple enough plot for younger audiences to follow and "just enough humor and intrigue" for adults, praising its "serendipitous" conclusion, "delightful" voice cast, and "humorous spin" on the original fairy tale, but writing that "the animation quality leaves a little to be desired". Fletcher Peters of The Daily Beast wrote that the film was "completely ludicrous, embarrassing, and almost impossible to believe that it's real—and yet entirely entertaining" and that it had been made into an "instant cult classic" by Twitter users, adding that Shore's performance "proves that he's a bonafide master of the art" of voice acting. For Decider, John Serba called the movie "dreadfully boring", its score "annoying, intrusive, [and] omnipresent", its dubbing "atrocious", and its character design "hideous", also writing that it had "the best animation Windows XP can possibly muster" and describing Pauly Shore's voice acting as Pinocchio as "a Valley Guy-via-Eastern-Bloc Dr. Frankenstein impression".
