= Jon McLaren =

Canadian actor (born 1984)

- Born: Jonathan Ian McLaren; Ottawa, Ontario, Canada
- Occupation: Actor
- Years active: 2006–present

Jonathan Ian McLaren is a Canadian actor. He was nominated for the British Academy Games Award for Performer in a Leading Role at the 18th British Academy Games Awards for his work as Star-Lord in Marvel's Guardians of the Galaxy.

== Career ==
In 2006, he made his acting debut in the film The Covenant, starring Steven Strait, Sebastian Stan, Toby Hemingway, Taylor Kitsch and Wendy Crewson. In 2011, he played the crush of Emily Osment's character in the television movie Cyberbully. His other film appearances include House at the End of the Street, Race, Total Frat Movie and Bottom of the World.

In 2021, he provided the voice and motion-capture of Peter Quill / Star-Lord in the video game Marvel's Guardians of the Galaxy.

== Filmography ==
=== Film ===
Year	Title	Role	Notes
2006	The Covenant	Bordy Becklin	
2009	Stripped Naked	Luc	Direct-to-video
2010	Donkey	Sebastian	
2010	Nazareth: Special Features	Judas	
2012	Eddie: The Sleepwalking Cannibal	Ice Fisherman #3	
2012	Undercurrent	Ray	
2012	House at the End of the Street	Zak	
2013	Crook	Pretty Boy	
2016	Trust No One	Carl	
2016	Race	Trent	
2016	Total Frat Movie	Zack 'Escobar' Smith	
2017	Bottom of the World	Jeremy	
2017	Darken	Taro	
2019	Mistletoe & Menorahs	Peter Carlson	
2021	Gutshot	Jack	
2022	Wolves	—N/a	Executive producer
2022	Sappy Holiday	James	

=== Television ===
Year	Title	Role	Notes
2008	A Woman's Rage	Mike	Television film
2009	My Nanny's Secret	Jace	Television film
2010	The Stepson	Kevin May	Television film
2011	Another Man's Wife	Robert Hamilton	Television film
2011	Cyberbully	Scott Ozsik	Television film
2011	Dark Secrets	Matt	Television film
2011	Metal Tornado	Shane	Television film
2012	Flashpoint	Jason	Episode: "Keep the Peace: Part 2"
2013	Haven	Tyler	Episode: "The New Girl"
2014	The Girl He Met Online	Benny	Television film
2014–2015	Heartland	Jesse Stanton	5 episodes
2015	The Perfect Girlfriend	Harrison	Television film
2017	Trapped by my Father's Killer	Chris Ratlidge	Television film
2017	Good Witch	Officer Charles	Episode: "Day After Day"
2017	Private Eyes	Peter Caplan	Episode: "The Good Soldier"
2017	Slasher	Ryan	Episode: "Dawn of the Dead"
2018	A Deadly Vendetta	Paul	Television film
2019	Winter Castle	Tony	Television film
2019	Blood & Treasure	20 Year Old Jacob Reece	Episode: "Legacy of the Father"
2019	Double Holiday	Bowie	Television film
2021	The Evil Twin	Jared Resnor	Television film
2021	Frankie Drake Mysteries	Robert	Episode: "Ghost in the Machine"
2021	Titans	Phil	Episode: "Lady Vic"
2021	The Great Christmas Switch	Jonathan	
2022	Sweet as Maple Syrup	Steven	Television film
2022	Picture Perfect Romance	Dr. Clark Bauer	
2023	House of Deadly Lies	Michael Johnson	
2023	Whiteout	Ben	
2023	Christmas on Windmill Way	Willem Jansen	
2023	Borje	Jim 'Howie' McKenny	
2024	Holiday Mismatch	Shane Harrison	Hallmark Movie
2024	A Novel Christmas	Jeffrey	

=== Video games ===
Year	Title	Role	Notes
2018	Far Cry 5	Catamount Mines Cultist	
2021	Marvel's Guardians of the Galaxy	Peter Quill / Star-Lord	
