= Meredith Monroe =

American actress (born 1969)

- Born: December 30, 1969 (age 56); Houston, Texas, U.S.
- Occupation: Actress
- Years active: 1997–present
- Spouse: Steven Kavovit (m. 1999)
- Children: 2

Meredith Leigh Monroe (born December 30, 1969) is an American actress best known for portraying Andie McPhee on Dawson's Creek from 1998 to 2003, her recurring role as Haley Hotchner on Criminal Minds and Carolyn Standall on 13 Reasons Why.

== Life and career ==
Monroe was born on December 30, 1969, in Houston, Texas. Her parents divorced when she was two, and she was subsequently raised in Hinsdale, Illinois. She studied at Hinsdale Central High School and after graduating moved to New York to pursue a modeling career. In 1995, she appeared in a number of TV commercials and magazine advertisements for L'Oreal hair-care, Disney Resort, Huffy bicycles, Ford cars, and Mattel toys.

In 1996, Monroe made the transition into acting when she was cast as Tracy Dalken in ABC series Dangerous Minds, which led to a small recurring role on Sunset Beach as Rachel, a pregnant teenager. This led to her being cast as a series regular on Dawson's Creek in the role of Andie. She was a series regular in seasons 2 and 3, appeared in several episodes at the beginning and end of season 4, and was a special guest star in the series finale in season 6 (though her scenes were cut from the televised episode, appearing only on the DVD extended-cut release).

She is also known for her role in Criminal Minds as Haley Hotchner, Aaron Hotchner's wife. Monroe left the series after her character was murdered by a recurring villain, The Boston Reaper (C. Thomas Howell), in the 100th episode. In 2018, she joined the cast of 13 Reasons Why in season two as Carolyn, the mother of Alex Standall.

== Filmography ==
Film
Year	Title	Role	Notes
1997	Norville and Trudy	Trudy Kockenlocker	
1997	Strong Island Boys	Weather Girl	
1998	Fallen Arches	Karissa	
2002	The Year That Trembled	Judy Woods	
2002	New Best Friend	Hadley Ashton	
2002	Minority Report	Pre-Crime Public Service Announcer	
2002	Full Ride	Amy Lear	
2003	Manhood	Clare	
2004	Shadow Man	Ms. McKenna	Short film
2005	Vampires: The Turning	Amanda	
2008	Black Crescent Moon	Suzy Beacon	
2009	Wake	Phaedra	
2009	Nowhere to Hide	Sara Crane	
2011	Low Fidelity		
2011	The Lift	Mary Lindsay	
2011	Transformers: Dark of the Moon	Julia Singer (Engineer's Wife)	
2011	Born Bad	Katherine Duncan	Video
2016	The Edge of Seventeen	Greer Bruner	

Television
Year	Title	Role	Notes
1997	Dangerous Minds	Tracy Daiken	Episode: "Everybody Wants It"
1997	Jenny	Brianna	Episode: "A Girl's Gotta Pierce"
1997	Hang Time	Jill	Episode: "Kristy's Other Mother"
1997	Promised Land	Meredith Bix	Episode: "Crushed"
1998	Sunset Beach	Rachel	4 episodes, Uncredited
1998	Night Man		Episode: "You Are Too Beautiful"
1998	The Magnificent Seven	Claire Mosley	Episode: "Manhunt"
1998	Players	Sarah Nolan	Episode: "Con-undrum"
1998–2003	Dawson's Creek	Andie McPhee	69 episodes
1999	Beyond the Prairie: The True Story of Laura Ingalls Wilder	Laura Ingalls Wilder	TV movie
1999	Cracker: Mind Over Murder	Devon Booker	Episode: "Faustian Fitz"
2002	Beyond the Prairie, Part 2: The True Story of Laura Ingalls Wilder	Laura Ingalls Wilder	TV movie
2002	The Division	Carol Manning / Jeanette	Episode: "Illusions"
2003	111 Gramercy Park	Leah Karnegian	TV movie
2003	The One	Gail Hollander	TV movie
2003	Mister Sterling	Olivia Haynes	Episode: "Statewide Swing"
2004	Joan of Arcadia	Michelle Turner	Episode: "Double Dutch"
2004	CSI: Miami	Claudia Sanders	Episode: "Under the Influence"
2004	Kevin Hill	Kate Ross	Episode: "Snack Daddy"
2005	House	Lola	Episode: "Sports Medicine"
2005	Fathers and Sons	Young Nora	TV movie
2005	Strong Medicine		Episode: "Broken Hearts"
2005	Cold Case	Cindy Mulvaney	Episode: "A Perfect Day"
2005–2009, 2013	Criminal Minds	Haley Hotchner	14 episodes
2006	Living With Fran	Beth	Episode: "Masquerading with Fran"
2006	Not My Life	Alison Morgan	TV movie
2006	CSI: Crime Scene Investigation	Sister Bridget	Episode: "Double Cross"
2006	Masters of Horror	Celia Fuller	Episode: "Family"
2007	Bones	Clarissa Bancroft	Episode: "The Man in the Mansion"
2007	Crossing Jordan	Rebecca	Episode: "Fall from Grace"
2007	The Wedding Bells		Episode: "The Fantasy"
2007	Shark	Nina Weber	Episode: "In Absentia"
2008	Moonlight	Cynthia	Episode: "The Mortal Cure"
2008	Californication	Chloe Metz	Episode: "Vaginatown"
2008	Private Practice	Leah Hurley	Episode: "Know When to Fold"
2009	Raising the Bar	Prof. Doris Castillo	Episode: "Bobbi Ba-Bing"
2009	Storm in the Heartland	Liz McAdams	TV movie
2009	The Mentalist	Verona Westlake	Episode: "Red Bulls"
2010	The Deep End	Molly Pierson	Episode: "Pilot"
2010	Psych	Catherine Bicks / Maddie Bicks	Episode: "Shawn 2.0"
2010	NCIS	April Ferris	Episode: "Cracked"
2011	The Closer	Tina Lynch	Episode: "Under Control"
2011	Hawaii Five-0	Trisha Joyner	Episode: "Ma'eme'e"
2011	Hart of Dixie	Mrs. Breeland	3 episodes
2012	CSI: NY	April Lewis	Episode: "Misconception"
2013	Drop Dead Diva	Violet Harwood	Episode: "Trust Me"
2013	The Husband She Met Online	Rachel Malemen	TV movie
2013	Secret Liaison	Samantha Simms	TV movie
2014	NCIS: Los Angeles	Heidi	Episode: "SEAL Hunter"
2015	Castle	Elise Resner	Episode: "Habeas Corpse"
2018–2020	13 Reasons Why	Carolyn Standall	10 episodes
2019	S.W.A.T.	Ainsley	Episode: "School"
