= Joyce Hyser =

American actress

- Born: New York City, U.S.
- Other name: Joyce Hyser Robinson
- Occupation: Actress
- Years active: 1980–2014
- Spouse: Jeff Robinson

Joyce Hyser is an American former actress. She is best known for her role in the 1985 cult classic Just One of the Guys and for her recurring role in L.A. Law. In 2012, Hyser turned her focus to writing and producing screenplays, and as of 2026 her last screen role was in 2014's The Wedding Pact.

== Early life ==
Joyce Hyser was born in New York City. She is Jewish. Hyser grew up on the East Coast and attended summer camp every year, sponsored by the Jewish Federation of Greater Philadelphia. She credits her summer camp experiences with helping her discover her talents and find the confidence she needed to pursue her dreams. Hyser studied acting in both New York City and Los Angeles.

== Career ==
Hyser appeared in various films in the early 1980s, and headlined the 1985 comedy Just One of the Guys. She then mainly guest-starred in television series, including a recurring role in L.A. Law as Allison Gottlieb, the girlfriend of Jimmy Smits's character. In 2011, Hyser appeared in a small role in CSI: Crime Scene Investigation as a woman who masquerades as a man.

She was featured prominently in the music video for "I Can Dream About You" by Dan Hartman. She was also featured in the music video for the 1994 song "Pincushion" by ZZ Top, a single from their 1994 album Antenna.

Hyser has been a spokeswoman for the Harold Robinson Foundation, named after her father-in-law, which provides a free summer camp for inner city and underprivileged children.

== Personal life ==
Hyser dated musician Bruce Springsteen for four years. Hyser dated and subsequently lived with actor Warren Beatty for a year and a half.

Hyser is married to Jeff Robinson, owner of Canyon Creek Properties. which Starting as the Harold Robinson Scholarship Fund in 2003, a wedding gift when Hyser married Jeff, the Harold Robinson Foundation was incorporated in 2009. As of 2026, both Hyser and her husband are on the board of the foundation.

== Filmography ==
=== Film ===
Year	Title	Role	Notes
1980	The Hollywood Knights	Brenda Weintraub	
1981	They All Laughed	Sylvia	
1983	Valley Girl	Joyce	Credited as Joyce Heiser
1983	Staying Alive	Linda	
1984	This Is Spinal Tap	Belinda	
1985	The Last Hunt	Pia	
1985	Just One of the Guys	Terry Griffith	
1990	Wedding Band	Karla Thompson	
1994	Greedy	Muriel	
2000	Can't Be Heaven	Friend	
2002	Teddy Bears' Picnic	Rita D'Onofrio	
2003	Art of Revenge	Lara Kane	Video
2014	The Wedding Pact	Sally	

=== Television ===
Year	Title	Role	Notes
1988	Freddy's Nightmares	Pretty Mary	Episode: "Saturday Night Special"
1989	Mancuso, F.B.I.	Major Jennifer Welch/Victoria Singer	Episode: "Suspicious Minds"
1989–1990	L.A. Law	Allison Gottlieb	Recurring role (10 episodes)
1990	Midnight Caller	Lou Ann	Episode: "Wrong Side of the Wall"
1990	Lifestories	Barbara Hudson	Episode: "Steve Burdick"
1990–1991	The Flash	Megan Lockhart	Recurring role (3 episodes)
1992	Raven	Nora Blake	Episode: "Is Someone Crazy in Here or Is It Me?"
1992	Melrose Place	Dawn Bonds	Episode: "Responsibly Yours"
1994	Viper	Claire	Episode: "Past Tense"
1995	The Marshal	Annette Gabbiano	Episode: "Unprotected Witness"
1995	Murder, She Wrote	Portia Dekker	Episode: "Game, Set, Murder"
1998	Pacific Blue	Dr. Alicia Alper	Episode: "Damaged Goods"
2001	The Division	Ms. Vicky Lowell	Episode: "The Fear Factor"
2011	CSI: Crime Scene Investigation	Monique Roberts	Episode: "Maid Man"
