= Sophie Gendron =

Canadian actress

- Born: Québec, Canada
- Occupation: Actress
- Years active: 2003–present

Sophie Gendron is a Canadian actress. She appeared in more than 40 movies, mostly made for Lifetime television. On Canadian television, Gendron had a recurring role in the drama series, He Shoots, He Scores. She also appeared in horror films Kaw (2006) and Metal Tornado (2011). Gendron starred in the 2020 comedy film Hotel Limbo, for which she received Dublin International Comedy Film Festival Award for Best Supporting Actress.

== Filmography ==
- A Woman Hunted (2003) as Marci Brewer
- Wall of Secrets (2003) as Wife
- The Perfect Husband (2004) as Penny Beaux
- Stranger at the Door (2004) as Delia Winter
- He Shoots, He Scores (3 episodes, 2004) as Marie-Josée
- Saving Emily (2004) as Taylor
- A Lover's Revenge (2005) as Sarah Jane Lang
- Maid of Honor (2006) as Dr. Volmar
- Murder in My House (2006) as Amanda Whitman
- The Perfect Marriage (2006) as Tia Montgomery
- The Rival (2006) as Lisa Kennedy
- Kaw (2006) as Tricia
- Demons from Her Past (2007) as Ellie Hollings
- Framed for Murder (2007) as Karen
- Christie's Revenge (2007) as Janet Michaels
- My Daughter's Secret (2007) as Anchor
- The Perfect Assistant (2008) as Mary-Beth
- Dead at 17 (2008) as Dominique Masterson
- A Nanny's Secret (2009) as Nicole
- The Perfect Teacher (2010) as Carrie
- The Perfect Roommate (2011) as Renée
- Metal Tornado (2011) as Allysa Winters
- The Wife He Met Online (2012) as Penny
- Fugitive at 17 (2012) as Mrs. Brooks
- The Perfect Boss (2013) as Gena Ferris
- The Husband She Met Online (2013) as Melissa
- Guilty at 17 (2014) as Aileen
- Killer Mom (2017) as Simone
- You Killed My Mother (2017) as Susanna Barett
- The Perfect Kiss (2018) as Britney
- A Daughter's Revenge (2018) as Doctor
- Zombie at 17 (2018)
- Mommy's Little Princess (2019) as Bethany
- My Mom's Darkest Secrets (2019) as Kelsie Hillman
- Obsession: Stalked by My Lover (2020) as Jenna Rothstein
- Hotel Limbo (2020) as Brigitte Zamboni
- Daddy's Perfect Little Girl (2021) as Gabrielle
- The Perfect Wedding (2021) as Allison Rice
- My Wacko Parents (2022) as Britney
- My Husband's Worst Mistake (2023) as Jackie
- Life Under Construction (2024) as Beatine
