= The Baby Pact =

2021 American film by Matt Berman

- Release poster
- Directed by: Matt Berman
- Written by: Matt Berman
- Produced by: Damian King; Jack Serino; Michael Gouloff; Susan Duff
- Starring: Haylie Duff
- Cinematography: Jason Andrew
- Edited by: Matt Pavlo
- Music by: Scott Glasgow
- Production company: Fantasy Forge Films
- Distributed by: Freestyle Digital Media
- Release dates: November 12, 2021 (Premiere); June 14, 2022 (United States)
- Running time: 100 mins
- Country: United States
- Language: English
- Budget: $1 million

The Baby Pact, also known as The Wedding Pact 2, is a 2021 American film written and directed by Matt Berman. It is a sequel to the 2014 film The Wedding Pact. It stars Haylie Duff as Elizabeth Carter, a pregnant widow who moves back to her hometown after the death of her husband. The film was shot in Fort Wayne, Indiana. It held a premiere in November 2021 and was released in the United States on June 14, 2022.

== Premise ==
Elizabeth's husband Mitch dies after three years of marriage. A pregnant Elizabeth moves back to her hometown to start a new life but her mother-in-law arrives seeking custody of her baby believing it is what her son wanted.

== Cast ==
- Haylie Duff as Elizabeth Carter
- Leslie Easterbrook
- Scott Michael Campbell
- Eric Scott Woods
- Kelly Perine
- Heather McComb
- Quinton Aaron
- Chase Masterson
- Gail O'Grady
- Connor Trinneer
- Kevin Farley
- Richard Riehle
- John Amos
- Malorie Mackey
- Nana Visitor

== Production ==
Following two delays caused by the COVID-19 pandemic, the film was announced in March 2021 when it was revealed production would take place in Los Angeles, California and Fort Wayne, Indiana. In May 2021, it was reported that principal photography had begun in areas around California, including L.A. and Orange County. Filming moved to Fort Wayne on May 22 for five days before concluding on May 26, 2021. On the location choice, Matt Berman explained that his decision was based on a dinner he had with Fort Wayne Architect Michael Gouloff, where Berman said he wanted to film it in L.A. and his wife responded by saying, "You need to make the movie in Fort Wayne, Indiana."

== Release ==
The film premiered in Fort Wayne on November 12, 2021.
