= Between Brothers =

- Genre: Sitcom
- Created by: Barry O'Brien & Cheryl Alu
- Starring: Kadeem Hardison; Dondré T. Whitfield; Kelly Perine; Rachael Crawford; Tommy Davidson
- Theme music composer: A Touch of Jazz (a.k.a. DJ Jazzy Jeff)
- Composer: Kevin Guillaume
- Country of origin: United States
- Original language: English
- No. of seasons: 2
- No. of episodes: 17

Production
- Executive producers: Alan Haymon; Barry O'Brien; Cheryl Alu
- Producers: Peter S. Palmer; Devon Shepard; Pam Veasey
- Camera setup: Multi-camera
- Running time: 30 minutes
- Production companies: O'Brien/Alu Productions; Alan Haymon Productions; Columbia TriStar Television

Original release
- Network: Fox
- Release: September 11, 1997 – January 29, 1998
- Network: UPN
- Release: February 9 – March 2, 1999

Between Brothers is an American television sitcom created by Barry O'Brien and Cheryl Alu, centered on four middle-class African American men in their late twenties, living in Chicago. It premiered on September 11, 1997, on Fox, with the second season airing on UPN, until March 2, 1999. The lead characters were played by Kadeem Hardison, Dondré T. Whitfield, Tommy Davidson, and Kelly Perine.

== Cast ==
- Kadeem Hardison as Charles Winston
- Dondré T. Whitfield as James Winston
- Kelly Perine as Dustin "Dusty" Canyon
- Rachael Crawford as Terri
- Tommy Davidson as Mitchell Ford

Recurring

- Brian Doyle-Murray as Stuart Franklin
- Sandy Brown as May Ford

== Episodes ==
=== Series overview ===
| Season | Episodes | Originally released | | |
| Season | Episodes | First released | Last released | Network |
|---|---|---|---|---|
| 1 | 13 | September 11, 1997 | January 29, 1998 | Fox |
| 2 | 4 | February 9, 1999 | March 2, 1999 | UPN |

=== Season 1 (1997–98) ===
| No. overall | No. in season | Title | Directed by | Written by | Original release date | Viewers (millions) |
|---|---|---|---|---|---|---|
| 1 | 1 | "In Case of Emergency" | Michael Zinberg | Barry O'Brien & Pam Veasey | September 11, 1997 | 7.55 |
James tries to prove to Charles that he is mature and responsible. Mitchell breaks up with his second wife and moves in with Dusty.
| 2 | 2 | "The Big Three-Oh" | Debbie Allen | Dave Schiff | September 18, 1997 | 6.80 |
As his 30th birthday approaches, Charles begins to feel over the hill after he and James lose a pick-up basketball game to a pair of teenagers.
| 3 | 3 | "Just Friends" | Matthew Diamond | Bob Keyes & Doug Keyes | September 25, 1997 | 7.72 |
After Terri breaks up with her boyfriend, each of the four guys try to make their move.
| 4 | 4 | "The Player" | Matthew Diamond | Barry O'Brien & Pam Veasey | October 16, 1997 | 6.35 |
Ladies man James gets a dose of his own medicine when his new girlfriend Vanessa (Salli Richardson) cheats on him. After Mitchell's divorce becomes final, Charles and Dusty take their bitter friend to a support group.
| 5 | 5 | "The List" | Debbie Allen | Anthony C. Hill | October 23, 1997 | 7.55 |
Charles' college friend Mason (Duane Martin), now a sports agent, connects Charles to the movers and shakers in the sports world, causing James, Mitchell and Dusty to feel left out.
| 6 | 6 | "Family Affair" | Paul Miller | Steve Ochs & Vinny Montello | October 30, 1997 | 6.72 |
When Mitchell's family comes to visit, he learns that his father expects him to return to Lansing, Michigan and take over the family business. Mitchell's sister may aggressively pursues James, while he tries to keep up with his very athletic girlfriend-of-the-moment. Charles inadvertently convinces Ronnie Lott (who appears as himself) to return to football.
| 7 | 7 | "Dusty's in Love" | Paul Miller | Barry O'Brien & Pam Veasey | November 6, 1997 | 7.38 |
Dusty meets the perfect woman (Tisha Campbell) for him, and soon wedding bells are ringing. James, Charles and Mitchell try their hand at the commodities market.
| 8 | 8 | "New Beginnings" | Rob Schiller | Barry O'Brien | November 13, 1997 | 8.18 |
Mitchell turns to ladies' man James for help in romancing a fellow teacher at his job. Charles' new boss Stuart Franklin (Brian Doyle-Murray) threatens to fire him unless he can get an interview with baseball player (Barry Bonds).
| 9 | 9 | "Elephant Men" | Howard Murray | Vince Cheung & Ben Montanio | December 4, 1997 | 6.36 |
Mitchell's plan to help Dusty boost his ratings results in a wild ride through the city on a runaway elephant. May pretends that Charles is her boyfriend to scare off her visiting ex-husband. James competes with a new colleague at work.
| 10 | 10 | "Scandalous" | John Ferraro | Bob Keyes & Doug Keyes | December 11, 1997 | 6.40 |
Sportswriter Charles discovers a football star in a compromising position. Mitchell's sister May moves to Chicago. . . and into the apartment with Mitchell and Dusty.
| 11 | 11 | "The Interview" | Matthew Diamond | Barry O'Brien & Pam Veasey | December 18, 1997 | 6.31 |
Charles faces an ethical dilemma when he realizes that his ex-girlfriend Rebecca (Vanessa Estelle Williams) holds the key to a new job that he is seeking. Dusty must fill in as the station's helicopter traffic reporter, even though he is terrified of heights.
| 12 | 12 | "Kung Fools" | Matthew Diamond | Devon K. Shepard | January 22, 1998 | 5.61 |
Embarrassed after May defends them from a bully at the Corner Pub, Mitchell and Dusty enroll in a karate class . . . with a group of 10-year-olds. Charles fears for his safety after he writes an article criticizing football legend Jim Brown (who appears as himself), and the angry Brown comes looking for him. James arranges a date for May.
| 13 | 13 | "Road Rules" | Jody Margolin Hahn | Barry O'Brien | January 29, 1998 | 5.84 |
Dusty, Mitchell and James travel to Lansing, Michigan, where Dusty is to receive an alumni award at their old high school. When an empty gas tank interrupts their journey, they reminisce about high school and events from 10 years earlier that cemented the friendship between the three of them and Charles. Note: This was the last episode of the series to air on Fox.

=== Season 2 (1999) ===
| No. overall | No. in season | Title | Directed by | Written by | Original release date | Viewers (millions) |
|---|---|---|---|---|---|---|
| 14 | 1 | "Let It Ride" | Unknown | Unknown | February 9, 1999 | 2.43 |
Mitchell tries desperately to avoid a $2000 gambling debt he owes to Stuart's bookie. Charles tries to track down a beautiful woman he met briefly at the Corner Pub. Note: This is the first episode to air on UPN.
| 15 | 2 | "Fantasy Camp/Home Boyz of Summer" | Unknown | Unknown | February 16, 1999 | 2.4 |
Mitchell, James, Dusty and Stuart are along for the ride when Charles covers Pete Rose's fantasy baseball camp for a story. Meanwhile, May and a baseball prospect find true love. Guest stars: Dominic Hoffman as Ramón Hernández. Pete Rose, Kenny Lofton and Darryl Strawberry all appear as themselves.
| 16 | 3 | "Spring Time" | Unknown | Unknown | February 23, 1999 | 3.22 |
Dusty, Mitchell and May are in the audience when the womanizing James appears as a guest on The Jerry Springer Show. In order to spend more time with a woman that he's interested in, Charles sets up Stuart with the woman's godmother.
| 17 | 4 | "Fire Walk" | Unknown | Unknown | March 2, 1999 | 2.73 |
The newspaper forces Charles and Stuart to attend a teamwork seminar. Dusty meets his biggest fan, but her unhealthy obsession with the weatherman soon spells danger for him, Mitchell and James.

== Syndication ==
Reruns of the series aired in the United States on the TV One cable network however they stopped as of 2014. The first-season episodes are available on Crackle as of 2020. Both seasons are available on Tubi.
