= Tug (film) =

- Film poster
- Directed by: Abram Makowka
- Written by: Abram Makowka
- Produced by: Scott J. Brooks; Hopwood DePree; Rebecca Green
- Starring: Sam Huntington; Haylie Duff; Zachary Knighton; Sarah Drew
- Cinematography: Adam Stone
- Edited by: David Hopper; Tim Mirkovich
- Music by: Jon Sadoff
- Production company: TicTock Studios
- Distributed by: Jumpstart Pictures
- Release dates: April 29, 2010 (Newport Beach); February 19, 2013
- Running time: 81 minutes
- Country: United States
- Language: English

Tug is a 2010 American romantic comedy film written and directed by Abram Makowka and starring Sam Huntington, Haylie Duff, Zachary Knighton, and Sarah Drew. It was shown at the Newport Beach Film Festival & the Waterfront Film Festival.

== Premise ==
A small-town guy (Huntington) tries to decide between staying with his current girlfriend (Drew) or going back to his psycho ex (Duff).

== Cast ==
- Sam Huntington
- Haylie Duff as Kim
- Zachary Knighton as Judd
- Sarah Drew as Ariel
- Wendi McLendon-Covey as Taylor
- Maulik Pancholy as Carl
- Yeardley Smith as Mom
- Dennis North as Dad
- Skyler Stone as Agent
- David Zellner as Geno

== Release ==
Tug was released on Amazon streaming on February 19, 2013.
