= Bottom of the World (film) =

- Directed by: Richard Sears
- Written by: Brian Gottlieb
- Story by: Brian Gottlieb; David Kowalski
- Produced by: Richard Sears; Robert Menzies
- Starring: Jena Malone; Douglas Smith; Ted Levine
- Cinematography: Adrian Langley
- Edited by: Brian Ufberg
- Music by: James Clements
- Production companies: Catalyst Global Media; Eggplant Pictures; Zed Filmworks
- Release date: February 1, 2017
- Running time: 85 minutes
- Countries: Canada; United States

Bottom of the World is a 2017 drama film. It was directed by Richard Sears, written by Brian Gottlieb and stars Jena Malone, Douglas Smith and Ted Levine.

== Plot ==
A couple traveling along Route 66 toward Los Angeles stop at a hotel. When Scarlett (Jena Malone) disappears, Alex (Douglas Smith) begins a search then is brought into the desert by a masked stranger. Alex wakes, only to find himself in a different life although he retains memories of Scarlett.

== Cast ==
- Jena Malone as Scarlett
- Douglas Smith as Alex
- Ted Levine as The Preacher
- Tamara Duarte as Paige
- Jon McLaren as Jeremy

== Production ==
Filming began in Ottawa, Ontario, Canada, on September 1, 2014. Filming also was located near Gallup, New Mexico and Albuquerque, New Mexico.

== Release ==
Bottom of the World was released on DVD and video on demand on February 1, 2017.
