= Marvel's Guardians of the Galaxy =

2021 video game

- Developer: Eidos-Montréal
- Publishers: Square Enix (2021–2022); Eidos-Montréal (2022–)
- Director: Jean-François Dugas
- Producers: Olivier Proulx; Hubert Corriveau
- Designer: Patrick Fortier
- Programmer: Daniel Letendre
- Artist: Bruno Gauthier-Leblanc
- Writer: Mary DeMarle
- Composer: Richard Jacques
- Engine: Dawn Engine
- Platforms: Nintendo Switch; PlayStation 4; PlayStation 5; Windows; Xbox One; Xbox Series X/S; Nintendo Switch 2
- Release: NS, PS4, PS5, Win, XBO, XSX/S; October 26, 2021; Nintendo Switch 2; November 5, 2026
- Genre: Action-adventure
- Mode: Single-player

Marvel's Guardians of the Galaxy is a 2021 action-adventure game developed by Eidos-Montréal and originally published by Square Enix. Set in an original universe based on the Marvel Comics superhero team of the same name, the game's plot follows the Guardians who, while attempting to capture a beast for a wealthy collector, inadvertently trigger a catastrophe which threatens the peace of the galaxy. The player controls the team's self-proclaimed leader, Star-Lord, and issues commands to other Guardians including Drax the Destroyer, Gamora, Rocket Raccoon and Groot. At certain points in the game, the player makes key decisions via dialogue trees that affect the relationships between Guardians and change the outcome of missions.

Marvel's Guardians of the Galaxy was the second game developed in partnership between Marvel Entertainment and Square Enix. The game is strictly single-player and has no downloadable content or microtransactions, marking a departure from Marvel Entertainment and Square Enix's previous game, Marvel's Avengers. Marvel collaborated closely with the team at Eidos to create an original version of the Guardians. Despite the game's lighthearted tone, themes of trauma and grief are central to the story. The soundtrack comprises an original score composed by Richard Jacques, various licensed songs from the 1970s and 1980s, and a 1980s-inspired album by the game's audio director, Steve Szczepkowski.

Marvel's Guardians of the Galaxy was announced in June 2021 and was released for PlayStation 4, PlayStation 5, Windows, Xbox One, and Xbox Series X/S on October 26, 2021. A cloud streaming version for Nintendo Switch was released on the same day. A port for Nintendo Switch 2 with exclusive content will release under the subtitle Encore Edition in November 2026. While anticipation for the game was low due to the lackluster reception of Marvel's Avengers, it received generally positive reviews from critics. It was praised for its narrative, music, characters, and cast performance, but its gameplay and combat systems drew mixed reactions. The game was nominated for several year-end accolades by gaming publications, as well as winning awards for "Best Narrative" at The Game Awards 2021, along with "Adventure Game of the Year" and "Outstanding Achievement in Story" at the 25th Annual D.I.C.E. Awards. Despite positive critical reception, the game failed to meet Square Enix's sales expectations.

== Gameplay ==
Star-Lord in combat with a creature on the planet Seknarf Nine

In Marvel's Guardians of the Galaxy, the player controls Peter Quill, also known as Star-Lord, from a third-person perspective. The player can attack enemies with elemental guns which have four shooting modes; ice shots temporarily freeze enemies, lightning shots stun them, wind shots pull in faraway enemies, and plasma shots deal fire damage to boss characters. The other Guardians, including Gamora, Rocket Raccoon, Groot, and Drax the Destroyer, are non-player characters controlled by artificial intelligence, but the player can issue commands to them during combat. Each Guardian has four unique abilities which can be chained to inflict more damage; Groot uses his roots to immobilize enemies, Rocket deploys various explosives and bombs, Drax can easily stagger enemies with his strength, and Gamora uses her sword to deal powerful melee damage. Players can also use environmental features to their advantage, for instance, by instructing Drax to hurl a large boulder at enemies.

As the Guardians engage in combat, a Momentum gauge will fill, allowing the player to perform a "Call-to-Action" attack which deals significant damage to stronger enemies. Some enemies also have a "stagger bar" which temporarily stuns them when depleted. Defeated enemies drop pick-ups which replenish Star-Lord's health. As the player progresses through the game, they earn experience points which can be used to unlock new abilities for team members. Another meter that fills during combat allows the player to perform a special ability called "Team Huddle", which briefly stops the fighting and prompts Star-Lord to make a motivational speech, accompanied by background music, to inspire his teammates. A good speech will grant the other Guardians combat bonuses and revive all fallen Guardians, though Star-Lord's abilities will be boosted regardless of the quality of the speech. Players have to listen to what the Guardians are saying and observe their emotional states in order to select the best response option during Team Huddle.

While the game is mostly linear, players are encouraged to explore each location to find components, collectibles, and costumes. The player navigates the environment with Star-Lord's jet boots and can use his visor to scan for objects of interest. There are also some segments where the player pilots the Guardians' spaceship, the Milano, in battle against hostile ships. Occasionally, players must utilize the skills of the other Guardians in order to progress. For instance, Rocket can use his engineering knowledge to open locked doors, allowing the team to reach otherwise inaccessible areas. Rocket can also use components at workbenches to craft combat perks for Star-Lord, which grant passive advantages such as increased health and shield regeneration.

At certain points in the game, the player makes key decisions via dialogue trees that affect the relationships between Guardians and change the outcome of missions. These choices are referenced by characters throughout the game. Players may also engage in optional conversations with other Guardians members aboard the Milano after gifting them an object of interest. Despite the branching dialogue paths, the overall plot is always the same and the game has only one ending.

== Synopsis ==
=== Characters ===
Marvel's Guardians of the Galaxy features the eponymous team, the Guardians of the Galaxy, including Peter Quill / Star-Lord (Jon McLaren), a Terran-Spartoi hybrid and leader of the group; Gamora (Kimberly-Sue Murray), the "deadliest woman in the galaxy" and adopted daughter of Thanos; Rocket Raccoon (Alex Weiner), a former bounty hunter, weapons specialist, and inventor; Groot (Robert Montcalm), Rocket's loyal partner and fellow former bounty hunter, who is the last of his species; Drax the Destroyer (Jason Cavalier), famed throughout the galaxy as the killer of Thanos.

The main antagonist groups are the Universal Church of Truth, led by Grand Unifier Raker (Andreas Apergis), and the Lethal Legion, a group of bounty hunters hired by Lady Hellbender (Sarah Levesque) which includes the Blood Brothers (Kwasi Songui and Christian Jadah) and Captain Glory (Danny Blanco Hall). Other characters include Peter Quill's former lover and Nova Corps Centurion Ko-Rel (Judith Baribeau), Ko-Rel's daughter Nikki Gold (Romane Denis), the "Celestial Madonna" Mantis (Emmanuelle Lussier Martinez), Cosmo the Spacedog (Alex Ivanovici), the Xandarian Worldmind (Robert Montcalm & Leni Parker), Adam Warlock (Brent Skagford), and Peter Quill's mother Meredith Quill (Mylene Dinh-Robic). The Guardians also face beasts such as the Dweller-in-Darkness and the legendary dragon Fin Fang Foom.

=== Plot ===
On Peter Quill's 13th birthday, Chitauri warriors attack his home, kidnapping him and killing his mother Meredith. Many years later, Quill—now a mercenary called Star-Lord—is the leader of the Guardians of the Galaxy, a group of "heroes for hire" hoping to make money during their adventurous wanderings around the galaxy.

In the years following a massive interstellar war, the Guardians have accepted a job to capture a rare monster for their patron, Lady Hellbender, the fearsome ruler of a planet of exotic and deadly beasts. They head to the Quarantine Zone, a restricted sector established by the Nova Corps to store debris from the war. However, they are forced to flee the zone when Quill accidentally releases an alien entity from a yellow gem. The Guardians are intercepted by the Nova Corps patrol ship Hala's Hope, captained by Quill's former lover, Centurion Ko-Rel. Ko-Rel detains the Guardians along with Grand Unifier Raker of the Universal Church of Truth, who was caught in the Quarantine Zone searching for his church's "golden god". While being processed, Quill meets a teenage Nova Corps cadet named Nikki Gold. Upon learning that Nikki is Ko-Rel's daughter, Quill suspects that he might be her father. Ko-Rel releases the Guardians with a time limit to pay their fine for trespassing, otherwise a device installed on the Milano would disable the ship.

In order to make money, the Guardians plan to scam money from Lady Hellbender by passing off Rocket or Groot as a rare creature. When their plan goes awry, the Guardians are once again forced to flee, though not before obtaining payment from Lady Hellbender to cover their fine. The Guardians then travel to "The Rock", a Nova Corps outpost where Hala's Hope is docked. There they find that several officers have mutinied in order to spread "the Promise". After the Hope leaves the station, the Guardians seek help from Cosmo the Spacedog, Head of Security on Knowhere. Cosmo agrees to aid the Guardians in investigating the Hope, which is now transmitting a strange signal; he sends them to the ship using a transportation system called the Continuum Cortex.

The Guardians board Hala's Hope and find a massive cannon siphoning "Faith Energy" from the planet below. They are then captured by Raker, who takes them to meet the "Matriarch" of his Church; To Quill's horror, the Matriarch is revealed to be Nikki. She is using the yellow gem to brainwash thousands of alien followers with the "Promise" by trapping them in illusions crafted from their deepest desires, then harnessing their devotion as Faith Energy to power the Church's fleet. Nikki tempts each of the Guardians with the Promise, and while they each manage to resist and escape the Church, Drax is shaken by what he saw. Quill also learns that Ko-Rel was killed by the mysterious entity he released.

The Guardians attempt to enlist the Xandarian Worldmind, but it concludes that the Church's victory is inevitable and flees the galaxy with the remainder of the Nova Corps. Drax then succumbs to the Promise and imprisons the rest of the team. With help from Mantis, the Guardians enter Drax's mind and convince him that the Promise is not real. They also encounter Adam Warlock, the Church's original "golden god" who faked his death and went into hiding on Mantis' planet. Warlock reveals that the alien entity controlling Nikki is his dark side, Magus, whom he sealed in the Soul Stone. Magus is manipulating Raker and the Church to gather Faith Energy on which he can feed.

The Guardians turn to Lady Hellbender as a last resort. To gain her favor, they subdue and gift her the legendary monster Fin Fang Foom, and she agrees to aid in an assault on the Church's flagship, the Sacrosanct. During their assault, Raker traps the Guardians in an energy field, but Quill manages to infiltrate Nikki's Promise. With the help of Ko-Rel's spirit—who reveals Nikki is an adopted war orphan and not Quill's daughter—Quill convinces Nikki to accept Ko-Rel's death, freeing her from Magus' control and unlocking her hidden powers. The Guardians kill Raker while Warlock absorbs Magus back into his body, ending the threat of the Church. As the galaxy celebrates being freed from the Church's brainwashing, the Guardians take their leave with Nikki as their new recruit.

Magus proves to be too much for Warlock to contain and takes over his body. Guided by Mantis, Quill risks his own life by wielding the Soul Stone to imprison Magus once again. Warlock thanks the Guardians for their help and takes custody of the Soul Stone, promising to find them should he need their help again. Quill contemplates how to care for Nikki as the Guardians set off to handle their next assignment: printing new business cards. However, if the player never paid the Guardians' fine, the ship is disabled by a Nova Corps tracker and the team is left stranded in space.

== Development ==
Marvel's Guardians of the Galaxy was developed by Eidos-Montréal. It is the second game made in partnership between Marvel Entertainment and publisher Square Enix, following Marvel's Avengers in 2019. The game features an original storyline, with Mary DeMarle serving as the game's narrative director, Jean-François Dugas as the game's director, and Richard Jacques as composer.

Development completed on September 16, 2021, with Eidos confirming that the game was finished and ready for release. The game is powered by Eidos' Dawn Engine, which was used in Deus Ex: Mankind Divided (2016). Guardians of the Galaxy would be the last title from Eidos-Montréal to utilize the in-house Dawn Engine as the company switched to Unreal Engine 5 for future projects.

=== Design ===
Unlike Marvel's Avengers, Marvel's Guardians of the Galaxy is exclusively single-player. The team experimented with multiplayer and cooperative gameplay modes, but scrapped them to focus on telling a character-driven story. Additionally, the designers did not want the player to be able to directly control other Guardians in order to prevent them from projecting their own personality onto them, allowing characters the freedom to grow and develop more complex relationships with each other. DeMarle has stated that they wanted the player to feel like they were "hanging out" with and "guiding" the characters rather than being them. The team at Eidos chose to portray the Guardians of the Galaxy as "underdogs", with Dugas and DeMarle feeling that this mirrored the public perception of their studio.

"Solo teamplay" mechanics were instrumental to the game's combat design. The mechanic of controlling Star-Lord while indirectly commanding other team members was inspired by team sports video games that lock players into a defined role. Each Guardian is capable on their own, but their perks and abilities are more effective when the player strategically commands them to act as a cohesive unit. The artificial intelligence behaviours of each character are based on their personality. For instance, Drax, being the most courageous, tends to charge first into battle and attack multiple enemies at once. At times the AI characters will make independent choices, leaving the player to decide if they trust them to follow through. The designers chose to limit Quill's abilities to prevent the other Guardians from feeling like "dead weight" and encourage them to engage the whole team in combat; If the player ignores the other Guardians and leaves them to fight on their own, they will tend to lose in battle.

The designers utilized "social mechanics", such as the team huddle and dialogue trees, to make the characters feel more alive. These social features impacted many other aspects of the game design. For instance, levels were designed to ensure that dialogue would not be interrupted by the player's traversal through the game world. By positioning Star-Lord at the heart of most social interactions, the player experiences the team dynamics by witnessing the other character's reactions to Quill's choices. While Quill is the team's self-proclaimed leader, other members of the Guardians may disagree with him and make their own choices, and Quill often has to rally the team towards a common goal. The designers drew inspiration from their previous game, Deus Ex, for the campaign structure and branching paths mechanic. Dugas has stated that the transition from working on Deus Ex to Guardians was a significant "brain shift" for the developers due to the contrast in tone and scale of the franchises.

DeMarle has said that incorporating humour into the dialogue was a challenge for the writing team. She and a team of seven writers would regularly gather to read drafts, workshop ideas, and bounce jokes off each other, then share credit for the resulting script. DeMarle added that it was not a "conscious decision" for the characters to be constantly talking to each other in the game; They were initially worried that playtesters would be irritated by the non-stop banter, but Dugas decided to keep it in the game. Despite the game's humorous tone, grief, loss, and tragedy are major themes of the story, with the backdrop of an intergalactic war drawing attention the characters' traumatic experiences both past and present. Brief flashback sequences featuring Quill's mother Meredith, who was killed during his childhood, communicate how loss shapes Quill's personality and behaviours. DeMarle also said that the balance between comedic and tragic scenes was an important aspect of the game's storytelling.

=== Characters ===
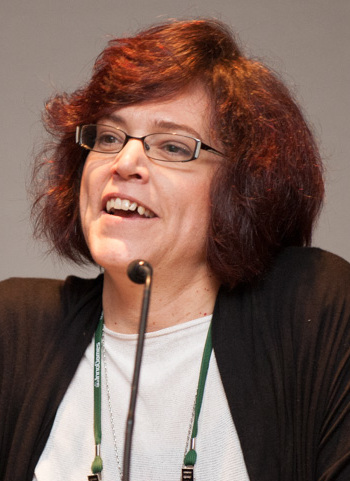
Mary DeMarle, the game's narrative director, had previously worked on Eidos' previous projects including the rebooted Deus Ex video games.

The development team worked closely with Marvel to ensure that the version of the characters featured were unique from those in both the Marvel Cinematic Universe (MCU) and the comics. The team also made a point of including lesser-known characters from the franchise, such as Lady Hellbender, who had not previously appeared outside of the comics. They felt encouraged to do so following Marvel's Avengers, which featured the lesser-known Kamala Khan as a member of the Avengers.

The origins of each Guardian were reinvented to better fit the context of the intergalactic war and their appearances were altered to align with their background while still being recognizable to the general public. Star-Lord was designed as a "time capsule of 1980s culture" sporting an exaggerated 80s haircut; Gamora wears full tactical body armor to reflect her status as the "deadliest woman in the galaxy"; Drax has many tattoos which chronicle important events in his life, such as the death of his family. Groot and Rocket are an inseparable duo; Rocket has a bead-shaped goatee that resembles Groot, and Groot wears a harness created by Rocket. Groot's armour design was inspired by Japanese mechs. Early drafts of character designs were more outlandish; For instance, Quill was compared to a "cosmonaut", Drax was fat, and Rocket Raccoon was the size of a human. These designs elicited a lukewarm reaction from Marvel, prompting the team to rework their designs.

Another significant theme reflected in the story is found family. While the Guardians began as a ragtag group of mercenaries, each with their own personal agendas, the events of the story bring them closer together. DeMarle has said that it was difficult for the gameplay and writing teams to balance the strong personalities and character arcs of all five Guardians. The moniker "Guardians of the Galaxy", which was chosen purely for marketing purposes, becomes a title they embrace, working together to save the galaxy from peril. Additionally, by the end of the story, the Guardians are united by being parental figures for the Nikki Gold, further transforming them into a family unit.

The voice cast features Jon McLaren as Peter Quill, Kimberly-Sue Murray as Gamora, Jason Cavalier as Drax, Alex Weiner as Rocket, and Robert Montcalm as Groot. While McLaren, Murray and Weiner stayed away from MCU content during the game's production, Cavalier watched the films and adopted that version of Drax's deadpan humour, literal speech, and unique mannerisms. Unlike the films, Gamora is not Quill's love interest as the team felt that a love story would detract from her own character and identity. Weiner also said that he tried to bring "animalistic qualities" to his version of Rocket, citing moments where Rocket bares his teeth. Montcalm had 1630 lines in the game, all of which were "I am Groot". However, each instance of the phrase has a unique meaning depending on the context. Weiner received a translated version of Groot's lines from the writing team, and worked closely with Montcalm on the performance.

=== Music ===
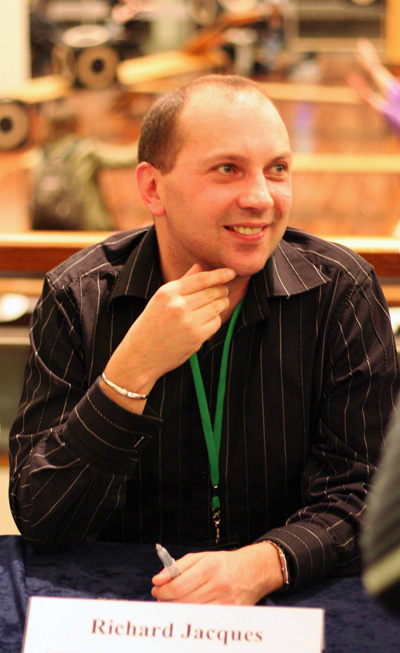
Richard Jacques, the game's composer

Game director Jean-François Dugas described music as an "additional character" in the game. Licensed songs, such as those by Pat Benatar, Wham!, Iron Maiden, and Joan Jett, are closely tied into the game's story, with their lyrics reflecting actions on screen. Quill's love of music from the 1980s was inspired by his character in the 2014 Guardians of the Galaxy film; music is instrumental to Quill's character development, being described by senior gameplay director Patrick Fortier as his last link to his childhood on Earth. Music is also connected to gameplay through the huddle mechanic, as Quill will select a song from his cassette to motivate his companions during his speech. In the game, Star-Lord is the name of a 1980s rock band on Earth. This helps established his connection to Earth, and provides context to his love for hard rock and metal music in the game. Audio director Steve Szczepkowski and sound designer Yohann Boudreault collaborated to write an album named Space Rider for the fictitious band. The game includes a "streaming mode" for content creators which disables all licensed music.

Szczepkowski approached composer Richard Jacques to work on the project in 2017. Jacques said that one of the biggest challenges was ensuring that transition from licensed music to the game's original orchestral music felt natural. To that effect, he paid special attention to make sure the orchestral score matched in key to the licensed songs which played alongside it. Jacques and Szczepkowski also tried to sync the tone of the music to game's branching dialogue options; Jacques stated that he mapped out the game's dialogue branches on large sheets of paper to analyze the difference in tone between each branch for each conversation, then scored them as if they were one singular scene. He said he did not want to emulate the score from the MCU films, and wanted it to have "a sense of trepidation and adventure" fitting for the Guardians franchise. The game's six-hour orchestral soundtracks were recorded at Abbey Road Studios, and the choral sections were performed by Pinewood Singers choir.

=== Release ===
Marvel's Guardians of the Galaxy was revealed on in January 2017 when Marvel Entertainment announced that it had partnered with Eidos' parent company Square Enix. The game was officially announced at E3 2021 and released for PlayStation 4, PlayStation 5, Windows, Xbox One, and Xbox Series X and Series S, on October 26, 2021. A Nintendo Switch version released the same day but utilizes cloud streaming, and thus saw no physical releases. The Windows version was produced in collaboration with D3T. The game has not offered any microtransactions and Eidos has not released any downloadable content for the game, but players who pre-ordered the game received additional outfits for the Guardians.

The Cosmic Deluxe Edition, which included a steel case and an art book, released alongside the regular edition. Square Enix and Marvel also partnered with Adidas to launch a collection of six different sneakers inspired by the Guardians. The Nintendo Switch 2 exclusive Encore Edition is set to release November 6th, 2026.

== Reception ==
=== Critical response ===
Reception

Aggregate score
Aggregator	Score
Metacritic	(PC) 78/100 (PS5) 80/100 (XSXS) 84/100 (NS) 58/100

Review scores
Publication	Score
Game Informer	8.5/10
GameSpot	7/10
GamesRadar+	4/5
IGN	8/10
PC Gamer (US)	70/100
The Guardian	3/5

Marvel's Guardians of the Galaxy received "generally favorable" reviews from critics for all platforms, except the cloud streaming version for Nintendo Switch which received "mixed or average" reviews, according to review aggregator website Metacritic. Multiple critics called it a fun single-player adventure game elevated by a strong story. It was often remarked as a surprise hit of the year since expectations were low following lukewarm reception of Marvel's Avengers. Several reviewers noted that the game suffered from technical issues at launch.

The game's story received praise. Tom Marks wrote for IGN that the team successfully balanced spectacle and heartfelt moments, noting that the constant banter between characters maintained an entertaining experience. Ryan Gilliam of Polygon praised the story for being "emotionally resonant" and commended the Guardians' character development. Andrew Reiner of Game Informer called the dialogue the best aspect of the game, saying that its "witty humor, heartfelt intimacy, and sheer chaos" were fitting for the Guardians franchise. He noted that Quill was "grating" at first, but he slowly grew to adore him. Jordan Ramée of GameSpot concurred that the story was well-written, adding that the characters and conflicts were "deeply relatable". Ramée also praised the voice cast, particularly Romane Denis' performance as Nikki Gold. He said that listening to dialogue was rewarding, but that the changes in the game's New Game Plus were not substantial enough to warrant a second playthrough. Sam Loveridge of GamesRadar called the game's script "brilliantly funny", "touching", and "emotional", stating that players will be invested in the personal stories of each Guardian. Vivek Gohil from Eurogamer described the game as a "celebration of the underrated cosmic side of Marvel" and remarked "[t]he theme of teamwork and relationships permeates every element of the game from combat to world interaction to narrative choices".

The gameplay had more mixed reactions. Marks noted that while the combat and level design were enjoyable and entertaining, they were neither deep nor innovative. Vikki Blake, also writing for Eurogamer, wrote that the on-screen action sometimes became too chaotic, and that the game's wealth of systems did not add any complexity. Malindy Hetfeld of The Guardian called the gameplay "disappointingly simple", stating that "combat takes little more than two buttons". Ramée also described the combat as "unremarkable", saying there was no incentive to use the combat abilities of each Guardian or Star-Lord's elemental guns. The combat system was further criticized for the way that enemies absorb damage due to their extended health bar. Ramée added that because of this, combat encounters often devolved into "grind-fests". Reiner compared the exploration to the Uncharted games; He said that combat was enjoyable, satisfying, and entertaining, but the start of the game felt uneventful as most of the game's powerful abilities were locked. The environmental puzzles were frequently criticized for being monotonous and static in difficulty; Ramée described them as "mildly annoying speedbumps".

The music of the game was also praised. Reiner wrote that the game had "a wonderful soundtrack filled with 1980s hits and great orchestration", which further heightens the dramatic moments in the game's story. Ramée said the soundtrack was "wonderful", and the licensed 80s tracks strongly complemented the game's original score. Oscar Gonzalez of CNET called it the "best '80s soundtrack for any video game". NME's Dom Peppiatt also lauded Eidos for their implementation of licensed tracks.

=== Sales ===
Marvel's Guardians of the Galaxy was the second best-selling boxed game in the United Kingdom on the week of its release, behind FIFA 22. It was also the seventh best-selling video game in the United States in October 2021. In February 2022, Square Enix stated that despite "strong reviews", the game had failed to meet their sales expectations. By November 2022, the game had attracted over 8 million players, including players on the PlayStation Plus Extra and Xbox Game Pass subscription services, with Square Enix stating holiday discounts stabilized earnings from Guardians.

=== Awards and accolades ===
Year	Award	Category	Result	Ref.
2021	The Game Awards 2021	Best Narrative	Won	
2021	The Game Awards 2021	Best Action/Adventure Game	Nominated	
2021	The Game Awards 2021	Best Score and Music	Nominated	
2021	The Game Awards 2021	Innovation in Accessibility	Nominated	
2021	National Academy of Video Game Trade Reviewers	Outstanding Game, Franchise Adventure	Nominated	
2021	National Academy of Video Game Trade Reviewers	Outstanding Original Dramatic Score, Franchise	Nominated	
2021	National Academy of Video Game Trade Reviewers	Outstanding Song Collection	Won	
2022	Steam Awards	Best Soundtrack	Won	
2022	11th New York Game Awards	Herman Melville Award for Best Writing in a Game	Nominated	
2022	25th Annual D.I.C.E. Awards	Adventure Game of the Year	Won	
2022	25th Annual D.I.C.E. Awards	Outstanding Achievement in Story	Won	
2022	22nd Game Developers Choice Awards	Best Audio	Nominated	
2022	22nd Game Developers Choice Awards	Best Narrative	Nominated	
2022	Ivor Novello Awards	Best Original Video Game Score (Richard Jacques)	Won	
2022	2022 SXSW Gaming Awards	Excellence in Narrative	Nominated	
2022	18th British Academy Games Awards	Audio Achievement	Nominated	
2022	18th British Academy Games Awards	Narrative	Nominated	
2022	18th British Academy Games Awards	Performer in a Leading Role (Jon McLaren as Star-Lord/Peter Quill)	Nominated	
2022	18th British Academy Games Awards	Performer in a Supporting Role (Jason Cavalier as Drax)	Nominated	
2022	18th British Academy Games Awards	Performer in a Supporting Role (Alex Weiner as Rocket)	Nominated	
2022	20th Annual G.A.N.G. Awards	Best Physical Soundtrack Release	Nominated	
2022	20th Annual G.A.N.G. Awards	Music of the Year	Won	
2022	20th Annual G.A.N.G. Awards	Sound Design of the Year	Nominated	
2022	20th Annual G.A.N.G. Awards	Best Ensemble Cast Performance	Won	
2022	20th Annual G.A.N.G. Awards	Best Voice Performance (Jon McClaren as Star-Lord/Peter Quill)	Nominated	
2022	20th Annual G.A.N.G. Awards	Audio of the Year	Nominated	
2022	20th Annual G.A.N.G. Awards	Best Cinematic & Cutscene Audio	Nominated	
2022	20th Annual G.A.N.G. Awards	Creative and Technical Achievement in Music	Nominated	
2022	20th Annual G.A.N.G. Awards	Best Non-Humanoid Performance (Robert Montcalm as Groot)	Nominated	
2022	20th Annual G.A.N.G. Awards	Dialogue of the Year	Nominated	
2022	20th Annual G.A.N.G. Awards	Excellence in Audio Accessibility	Nominated	
2023	65th Annual Grammy Awards	Best Score Soundtrack for Video Games and Other Interactive Media	Nominated	
