= My Nanny's Secret =

A Nanny's Secret
- Directed by: Douglas Jackson
- Written by: Christine Conradt
- Produced by: Neil Bregman; Stefan Wodoslawsky
- Starring: Haylie Duff; Jessica Steen; Eric Johnson; Dillon Casey; John McLaren
- Cinematography: Bert Tougas; Bill St. John (as William St. John)
- Edited by: Ion Webster
- Music by: Joseph Conlan
- Production companies: Capital Productions, Thrill Films
- Distributed by: Lifetime
- Release date: October 7, 2009
- Running time: 91 minutes
- Country: Canada
- Language: English

My Nanny's Secret (originally A Nanny's Secret) is a 2009 Lifetime Channel original Thriller/Mystery/Crime movie starring Haylie Duff and directed by Douglas Jackson. A home invasion robbery ends in tragedy when a member of the wealthy Tyrell family is killed. Their live-in nanny, Claudia (Haylie Duff), begins to secretly suspect that her troubled brother (Dillon Casey) may be the murderer. Unwilling to share her suspicions until she is certain, Claudia begins her own investigation, which takes her down a very dark and unexpected road. The more that Claudia finds out about the killer, the closer she comes to their secrets, ultimately putting her own life in terrible danger. The film premiered on October 7, 2009 in Canada.

== Plot ==
Claudia (Haylie Duff) is out for dinner with her boyfriend Drew (Eric Johnson) and his friend, Jace (Jon McLaren). While she is out, she gets a call from her brother Carter (Dillon Casey) who has been arrested for the third time and needs her to bail him out of jail. She heads to the jail with Drew and bails Carter out. On the way to dropping Carter off at his place, the three of them argue about Carter always getting himself into trouble. After they drop him off, Drew proceeds to drop off Claudia and they continue to discuss Carter's problem. Drew believes that Carter is taking advantage of Claudia and that she needs to stop bailing Carter out all the time, but Claudia disagrees and angrily leaves the car. She returns to her job as a live-in nanny for the wealthy Tyrell family to their young son Aidan and walks in on her bosses Julia Tyrell and her husband Evan Tyrell arguing. Julia notices Claudia, asks her how her night was and asks her to go and check on Aidan. Shortly after, we see Carter walk into what looks like a shed or garage and is frantically looking for something. We later learn that Carter was hiding drugs for a drug dealer and that what he was looking for was a stash of cocaine worth 10k and that he has a week to produce the cash. Later, Carter pays a visit to Claudia and begs her for a $12,000 loan to pay off the drug dealer, and that without the money, the drug dealer will have him killed. Claudia doesn't believe him and refuses to help, and he proceeds to storm off. One of the neighbours overhears their entire fight.

The next night, Claudia is at home with Aidan, Julia and Julia's father when a burglar breaks in and robs the family. Claudia was upstairs with Aidan at the time and the two of them hide in the closet. Aidan's grandfather tries to stop the robbers with a golf club, but the intruder shoots him. The police and paramedics arrive at the scene and rush the grandfather to the hospital where he later dies. At the hospital and the Tyrell home, the police are taking statements. Claudia starts to think about Carter and suspects that he may be involved. She gives him a call, which he does not answer, and she decides not to tell the police about him. In another scene, Drew is sitting at the table with Jace when Claudia calls him and explains to him what happened. After she hangs up, Drew tells Jace that if anyone asks about his whereabouts the night of the incident, that he was with Jace all night.

In a meeting between the detectives and Julia and Evan, they inform them that they believe that the intruder knew the family. As the investigation continues, the detectives learn about Carter and the trouble he's been involved with and starts to suspect that he was behind the robbery and the murder of the grandfather and that Claudia is somehow connected. This discovery results in Julia kicking out Claudia from their home. While Claudia is in her car, the drug dealer that Carter owes money to jumps into her car and threatens her with a gun if Carter doesn't pay up.

While at a corner store, Carter sees himself on tv and hears on the news that he's a suspect. This news story leads him to call Claudia, and the two of them meet up. Carter tells her that he had nothing to do with what happened and explained to her what happened that led him to recently being arrested. She believes Carter and urges him to lie low as she tries to figure out who could've done this. She starts to suspect Drew since he didn't answer any of her calls the night of the robbery and confronts him about his whereabouts. They argue and he reveals that he was out with ex-girlfriend which was why he lied. Later, the two reconcile and as they're talking she starts to suspect that maybe it was Jace as he was also missing that night. Drew doesn't believe Jace is capable of this but as he and Claudia investigate, his suspicion starts to rise. More clues point to Jace as the one behind everything. Later, Claudia and Jace are alone in the house, and when he realizes that Claudia is on to him, he tries to hurt her, but she runs away causing him to run after her. Drew comes home shortly after and realizes something is off when he sees Claudia doesn't seem to be around and that keys are lying on the floor. He later finds Claudia and the two of them are able to take down Jace long enough for the police to arrive. In the end, charges are dropped against Carter, Carter and Drew make amends and Claudia reconciles with the Tyrell family.

== Cast ==
- Haylie Duff as Claudia
- Jessica Steen as Julia Tyrell
- Eric Johnson as Drew
- Dillon Casey as Carter
- Jon McLaren as Jace
- Stewart Bick as Evan Tyrell
- Alex Cardillo as Aiden Tyrell
- Sophie Gendron as Nicole
- Shawn Lawrence as Kurt (the grandfather)
- Tyrone Benskin as Detective Drabant

== Production ==
My Nanny's Secret was filmed in Ottawa, Ontario, Canada.

== Release ==
The films premiered on October 7, 2009 in Canada.

=== Home media ===
The DVD was released through Lifetime on Lifetime DVDs. The film was also released on DVD in Australia.

== Reception ==
CineMagazine rated the film 1 star.
