= The Husband She Met Online =

- Written by: Christine Conradt
- Directed by: Curtis Crawford
- Starring: Jason Gray-Stanford; Meredith Monroe
- Theme music composer: Richard Bowers
- Original language: English

Production
- Producer: Stefan Wodoslawsky
- Cinematography: Bill St. John
- Editor: Jordan Jensen
- Running time: 90 minutes

Original release
- Network: Lifetime
- Release: October 26, 2013

The Husband She Met Online is a made-for-television drama thriller film that premiered on Lifetime on October 26, 2013.

== Plot ==
Rachel Maleman is an event planner at a hotel in Philadelphia. She previously dated her co-worker John Anderson, however, she broke off their three-year relationship after he got drunk and cheated on her at a work convention. She also works alongside her roommate and best friend, Laura. Rachel begins online dating and meets Craig Miller, a wealthy businessman who runs his mother's real estate company. The two start going on dates where Craig charms Rachel with his extravagant gestures and playful personality; however, John still has feelings for Rachel.

Despite Rachel concealing her new boyfriend from John, he finds out since he saw them at the hotel bar together, along with other clues like Craig sending Rachel a bouquet of her favorite flowers. John reveals this knowledge during an early dinner with Rachel where he again genuinely implores her to take him back, which Rachel tells him she'll consider. Rachel lies to Craig about the dinner, but unbeknownst to her he spied on her. Craig's behavior escalates to stalking Rachel outside her house and having his tech guy bug her computer so he can monitor her emails. Overcome with jealousy, Craig sends his brother Ryan to kill John, telling him John is a friend of his ex-girlfriend's out to ruin them.

A private investigator named Jerry Berman is hired by the father of one of Craig's ex-girlfriends, Dominique, who went missing. It is revealed that she was murdered by Craig when she told him that she was pregnant. Jerry investigates another woman that Craig dated, Melissa; she was assaulted by Craig, and he paid her to drop the charges against him and tell the authorities she lied about Craig hitting her. After dating Rachel for a while with John out of the picture, Craig proposes to her. While wedding dress shopping, Craig stops by the boutique and picks out the dress he wants Rachel to wear, ignoring her and Laura's opinions. Craig also asks Rachel to move in with him, quit her job, and start her own event planning business under him, so that he can spend more time with her. Jerry stops by Rachel's office and fills her in about Craig's ex-girlfriends, but when she raises these concerns to Craig, he acts dismissive and claims that people always lie about his family to get money out of them.

After calling various resources and discussing matters with Laura, Rachel becomes uncertain about marrying Craig and confronts him about all he's been hiding. They get into an argument and when Rachel says she wants a break from Craig, he tackles her to the bed and handcuffs her to it for the night. The next morning, Ryan stops by to drop off Rachel's dress and she screams for him to help, but Craig ushers him out of the bedroom to explain himself. Ryan tries to talk Craig out of the plot, but soon gets fed up and leaves, telling his brother to handle his own mess. Craig then explains to Rachel that she must call her boss and quit, because they're immediately getting married at a courthouse and then flying to Belize. He says if she tries to run away or get help, he will kill Laura and make it look like an accident. He also makes Rachel abandon her dog, Cody, at the side of the road. While Rachel and Craig are wed at the courthouse, Cody is rescued.

A veterinarian calls Laura about Cody being found, which confuses her since when Rachel called her, she claimed she and Craig were bringing Cody on their sudden honeymoon. Due to her suspicions, she tells Jerry about what's happened. Ryan, who has been drowning in guilt after killing John, tells Jerry about Craig's plans. With reinforcements close behind, Jerry confronts Craig at his airport with a gun aimed at him, but Craig grabs Rachel and points a gun at her. During the stand-off, Rachel elbows Craig and manages to escape his grasp, with Jerry shooting him several times. He dies and Rachel tearfully removes her ring. About a year later, Rachel, Laura, Cody and Laura's young daughter are peacefully enjoying their time at a park.

== Cast ==
- Jason Gray-Stanford as Craig Miller
- Meredith Monroe as Rachel Maleman
- Brett Watson as John Anderson
- Damon Runyan as Ryan Miller
- Krista Morin as Laura
- Bill Lake as Jerry Berman
- Mimi Kuzyk as Dorris Miller
- Stephen MacDonald as Kevin
- Sophie Gendron as Melissa
- Allison Brennan as Dominique

== Reception ==
Radio Times wrote, "One of a series of cautionary 'Met Online' tales from director Curtis Crawford, it's an entirely by-the-numbers affair both in story and execution. So while a likeably radiant Monroe naturally thinks she's found her Prince Charming in Jason Gray-Stanford, the overuse of flashbacks and agitated facial expressions boringly hammers home the cliché that his wealthy obsessive is actually murderously bad news. Proceedings become slightly more entertaining in the far-fetched last third, when the poor woman finally faces up to what viewers knew from the opening scene, but the rushed climax is disappointingly ineffective."
