= The Adventures of Jinbao =

2012 Hong Kong film by Leo Lo

- Theatrical release poster
- Directed by: Leo Lo
- Written by: Andy Ng Yiu-Kuen; Lam Fung
- Story by: Peter Cheung Wing-Yiu
- Produced by: Ye Maoxi; Meta Chen; Peter Cheung Wing-Yiu
- Starring: Rob Schneider; Haylie Duff; Norm Macdonald; Lauren Elizabeth; Tom Kenny
- Edited by: Leo Lo; Hu Jianhui
- Music by: Lui Jia
- Production company: Legendtoonland Limited
- Distributed by: Huanxu Cultural Media
- Release dates: 10 August 2012 (Hong Kong); 2 August 2016 (United States)
- Running time: 78 minutes
- Country: Hong Kong
- Languages: Cantonese; English
- Box office: $385,656

The Adventures of Jinbao
- Traditional Chinese: 金寶歷險記
- Simplified Chinese: 金宝历险记
Transcriptions
Standard Mandarin
- Hanyu Pinyin: Jīnbǎo lìxiǎn jì

The Adventures of Jinbao (Chinese: 大兵金寶歷險記; released as The Adventures of Panda Warrior in the United States) is a 2012 Hong Kong computer-animated action comedy martial arts film directed by Kwok-Shing Lo and written by Andy Ng Yiu-Kuen and Lam Fung from an original story by Peter Cheung Wing-Yiu. The film's English cast features Rob Schneider (in a dual role), Haylie Duff, Norm Macdonald, Lauren Elizabeth, and Tom Kenny (in a triple role). Many of the film's fight scenes were animated using motion capture. It is loosely based on the Kung Fu Panda franchise.

== Plot ==
In Imperial China, a soldier named Jinbao has heard about Merryland from his grandfather who gave him a necklace he got. His Captain states that the world won't be at peace. During an attack on their camp, Jinbao runs off the cliff and finds himself in Merryland as a panda. When falling out the sky, he is saved by Flying Pig. Jinbao learns about Merryland and how it is ruled by an evil master and his Phantom Army as well as the prophecy of the Panda Warrior.

While traveling through the forest, they are attacked by a giant spider. Then they spar with Mantis who becomes their ally. Arriving at a village of talking onions, they find it attacked by the Phantom Army which is led by a pyrokinetic tree spirit named Charcoal. With help from Flying Pig claiming that Charcoal insulted his grandfather, Jinbao subdues Charcoal in the nearby water. A Ginseng Spirit arrives and plays the Song of Peace to purify it. Jinbao learns from the Ginseng Spirit that he must rest in order to have the energy to do the Song of Peace. Now purified, Charcoal joins up with Jinbao.

Traveling through the field, Jinbao, Flying Pig, Mantis, and Charcoal are attacked by the Phantom Army's general Cattle. They are joined by Flying Pig's fellow rebels Cotton Sheep Sister, Steel Mouth Chicken, Horse, Big-Eyed Monkey, Golden Retriever, and Big-Eared Rabbit. Despite the difficulty, the group manages to knock Cattle off a cliff. Jinbao gets to know each of the members where he did annoy Horse by stating that he looks more like a hippopotamus than a horse.

The group arrives at the headquarters of the rebellion where they meet with Lion King. When he sees Jinbao, Lion King states that Jinbao is not the Panda Warrior of Legend. The history is that Merryland is guarded by the heavenly whale Hope and Faith. When Hope absorbed too much of the Dragon Ball of Light, a warrior from Earth appeared and became the Panda Warrior. Jinbao figures out that the Panda Warrior is his grandfather. When his grandfather defeated Hope and returned to his world with the necklace from Merryland's ruler Princess Angelica, an evil rat arrives in Merryland where he took control of Hope's body and turned it into a giant monster with nine snake-like heads in order to enslave Merryland. Jinbao asks for Lion King to train him. Despite many painful and comical outcomes, Jinbao passes the training.

Jinbao and Charcoal pay a visit to the Fox Elder in order to find the Nine-Headed Snake's lair where he is keeping Princess Angelica captive. After getting a stone that came off the lair and a piece of paper to use for emergencies, Jinbao and Charcoal find Cotton Sheep Sister who states that the other rebels have been captured by the Phantom Army. Once they have found the Nine-Headed Snake's lair, the three of them are attacked by a corrupted Flying Pig who they knocked out. Traveling through the caves, Jinbao, Charcoal, and Cotton Sheep Sister are attacked by the corrupted rebels and brought to Cattle. It is then revealed that the rebels faked being corrupted as they attack Cattle. Once Cattle is restrained, the Ginseng Spirit arrives and plays his Song of Peace to purify Cattle. Now purified, Cattle joins up with the rebels to rescue Princess Angelica.

As the group gets further into the Nine-Headed Snake's lair, they are attacked by the Nine-Headed Snake. Each of them tries to attack the Nine-Headed Snake only to fail because his heads can regenerate. Charcoal sacrifices himself to buy everyone else time to get to Princess Angelica. Big-Eyed Monkey reads from the partially-burned paper that one must be sacrificed to save everyone. They find her chained over the water that is filled with evil poison that is slowly corrupting the Dragon Ball of Light. Cattle starts to make up for his mistake by traversing the poison water to rescue Princess Angelica as he is the only one who can break the chains. Cattle collapses as Jinbao hopes that he'll recover. When the Nine-Headed Snake starts to catch up to them, Mantis appears and has dug a hole for everyone to escape through. Cattle buys everyone time to get out. The Nine-Headed Snake starts to tunnel after them as his flying lair collapses.

When morning comes, Steel Mouth Chicken crows at the sight of the sun. As Jinbao faces the Nine-Headed Snake, a recovering Princess Angelica states that the Nine-Headed Snake is at his weakest during the day. The rebels join the fight against the Nine-Headed Snake. The Ginseng Spirit shows up and plays his Song of Peace to weaken the Nine-Headed Snake. Faith shows up to help as she restores the land, purifies the Phantom Army, and even revives Cattle and Charcoal offscreen. The rebels then do a combo attack against its heads in order to defeat it while getting entangled. Cotton Sheep Sister attacks the Wind Head, Horse attacks the Water Head, Mantis attacks the Ice Head, Big-Eared Rabbit attacks the Fire Head, Big-Eyed Monkey attacks the Electric Head, Flying Pig attacks the Poison Head, Golden Retriever attacks the Spear Head, Steel Mouth Chicken attacks the Bewitching Head, and Jinbao attacks the main head. The final blow breaks the Nine-Headed Snake as the evil rat emerges from the main head and flees Merryland.

What's left of the Nine-Headed Snake is restored to Hope as she rejoins Faith in the sky. Princess Angelica gives them the Dragon Ball of Light as she states that Hope and Faith will continue to guard Merryland. Everyone celebrates their victory.

During the credits, Jinbao is back on Earth as he spars with his Captain using the moves that he learned in Merryland as well as drinking alcohol. Their sparring ends in a draw.

== Cast ==
- Lam Chi-chung as Jinbao, an Imperial China soldier who is turned into a giant panda upon being transported to Merryland
- Wang Mijia as Flying Pig, a big-eared pig and member of the resistance who can fly.
- Ji Tao as Lion King, a lion with a scarred left eye who trains Jinbao to fight.
- Ke Siming as Sister Sheep, a sheep with extending horns and member of the resistance who is into beauty.
- Zheng Yang as Charcoal Puppet Vanguard, a tree spirit and self-proclaimed Phantom Warrior who can perform fire attacks that allies with Jinbao and the resistance after being purified.
- Hao Yu Lan as Ginseng Spirit, the spirit of a ginseng who allies with Jinbao and the resistance and plays the Song of Peace to undo evil spells.
- Jun Hu as
  - Mantis, a member of the resistance.
  - Iron-Billed Chicken, a member of the resistance whose pecks can break through rocks.
  - Nine-Headed Snake, a giant monster with snake heads who was the result of an evil rat merging with the heavenly whale Hope.
- Xiang He as:
  - Bull, a bull with super-strength and enhanced durability who allies with Jinbao and the resistance after being purified.
  - Horse, a hippopotamus member of the resistance who prefers to be called a "river horse."
- Jack Tu as Big-Eyed Monkey, the resistance's residential inventor.
- Jerry Liau as Golden Retriever, a member of the resistance.
- Jiao Jiao as:
  - Big-Eared Rabbit, a member of the resistance.
  - The White Dragon Princess, a barefoot human-shaped figure and ruler of Merryland who is held captive by the Nine-Headed Snake.

=== English dub ===
- Rob Schneider as:
  - Patrick
  - Jimmy Ginseng
- Haylie Duff as GoGo Goat
- Norm Macdonald as King Leo
- Lauren Elizabeth as Peggy Skyflyer
- Tom Kenny as:
  - Bernie Hothead
  - Manny Mantis
  - Spinny the Monkey
- Jamieson Price as Crusher the Ox
- Michael Sorich as Shadowfeet the River Horse
- Spike Spencer as Billy Beakman
- Tom Fahn as Bruce Barkley
- Wendee Lee as:
  - Bobby Bunny
  - Princess Angelica
  - Fox Elder
- Michael McConnohie as Captain
- Derek Stephen Prince as the Nine-Headed Snake

Amanda Celine Miller, Tony Oliver, and Ben Pronsky provide additional voices in the film.

=== Other languages ===
Jackie Chan voiced Jinbao in the Mandarin version.

== Crew ==
=== English dub ===
- Wendee Lee – Voice Director
- Tony Oliver – Voice Director

== Release ==
The film was originally released in mainland China and Hong Kong on August 10, 2012, in both 2D and 3D.

The film was brought over to the US for an English language release in 2016, the English dub for the film was produced at Bang Zoom! Entertainment and features a few celebrity voices such as Rob Schneider, Haylie Duff, and Norm MacDonald. The English dub was released on DVD by Lionsgate Home Entertainment on August 2, 2016.

There were a few changes done to the film for its American release, such as Jinbao's name being changed to Patrick. A song exclusive to the film's English dub called "Miracle" was included in the end credits, this same song was previously used in the American release of The Giant King and was later used again in the American release for Air Bound.

== Production ==
The project was announced as early as 2009 as an animated spin-off adaptation of Little Big Soldier. Jackie Chan granted Huanxu Culture Media a license to use his character in the film.

According to the producers, the film represents an investment of 150 million yuan and was produced in cooperation with the British channel Propeller TV for international distribution.

The studio also highlighted the use of motion capture and advanced three-dimensional rendering techniques for character animation.

== Music ==
The film's main theme is Beautiful Kingdom (美丽国), composed, arranged, and performed by Liu Jia, with lyrics by Wang Yunyun.

== Reception ==
The film received an unfavorable critical reception. On the Chinese website Douban, it has a rating of approximately 2.5/10 based on several hundred user ratings.
