= Haylie Duff =

American actress and singer (born 1985)

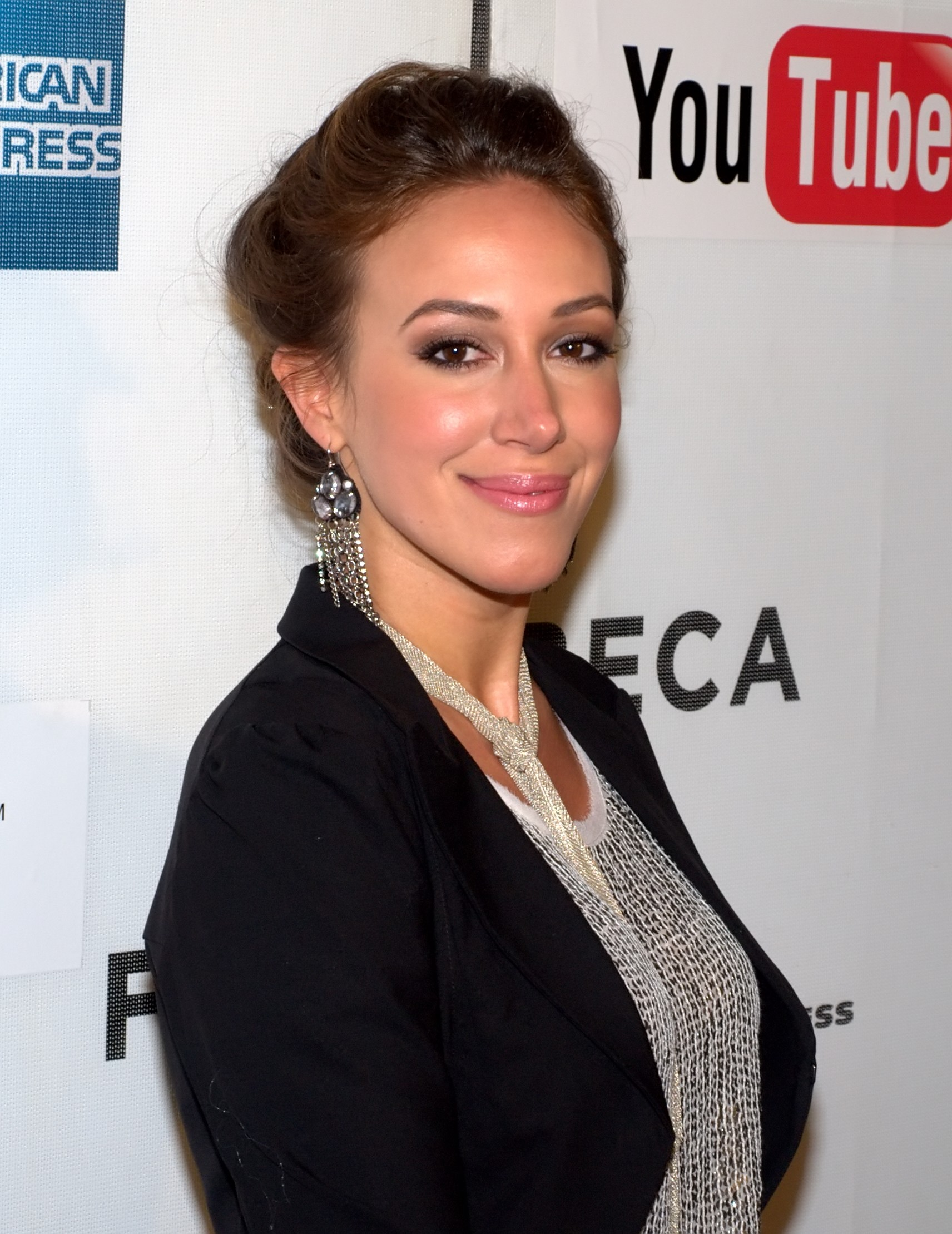
- Duff at the 2010 Tribeca Film Festival
- Born: Haylie Katherine Duff; February 19, 1985 (age 41); Houston, Texas, U.S.
- Occupations: Actress; singer; television personality
- Years active: 1997–present
- Partner: Matt Rosenberg (2012–2026)
- Children: 2
- Relatives: Hilary Duff (sister)
- Website: haylie-duff.com

Haylie Katherine Duff (born February 19, 1985) is an American actress and singer. She is best known for her roles as Sandy Jameson in the television series 7th Heaven, Amy Sanders in Lizzie McGuire and Summer Wheatly in Napoleon Dynamite. Duff is a food blogger and hosted a cooking show, The Real Girl's Kitchen, in 2014. She is the older sister of Hilary Duff.

== Early life ==
The older sister of Hilary Duff, Haylie Duff was born in Houston. Duff's mother, Susan Colleen Duff (née Cobb) is a film producer who was a co-executive producer of A Cinderella Story (2004), a producer of The Perfect Man (2005) and Material Girls (2006), and the manager of Hilary; she was previously a homemaker. Her father, Robert Erhard "Bob" Duff, a partner and owner in a chain of convenience stores with his father, John B. Duff, resides at the family home in Houston to maintain the family's business. She began her acting career as an offshoot of her early dance training. Growing up in Texas, Duff began ballet at an early age. By the age of eight, Duff landed a role in the Houston Metropolitan Dance Company's production of The Nutcracker Suite.

== Career ==
=== Acting ===
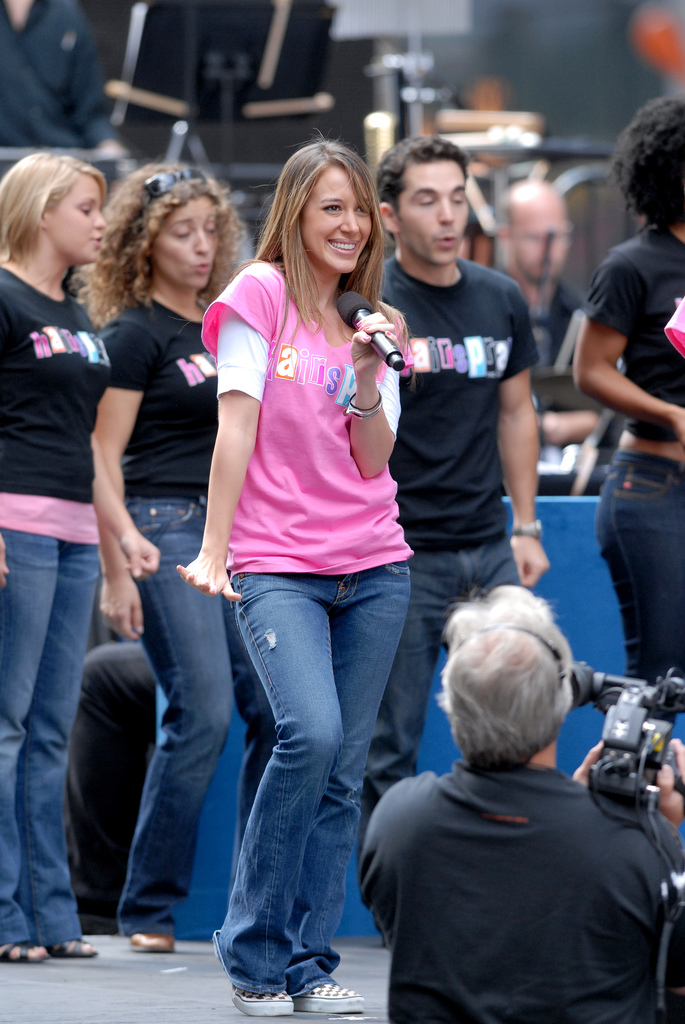
Duff in the cast of Hairspray performing "Mama, I'm a Big Girl Now" during a street performance of the song

Duff's early career started by making guest appearances on made-for-television films such as True Women and on TV series such as The Amanda Show. In addition to guest-starring roles on Chicago Hope, Boston Public, and Third Watch, Duff became a familiar face starting in late 2002 as Amy Sanders on Lizzie McGuire. In 2004, Duff made a guest appearance on That's So Raven as Katina Jones. After making guest appearances on television, Duff received her first role in a feature film when she was cast as Summer Wheatly in Napoleon Dynamite. The film earned her first Teen Choice Award win. She continued making guest appearances, which include Joan of Arcadia and American Dreams. She also lent her voice talent to the Christmas animation film In Search of Santa which again, featured sister Hilary. In 2005, Duff joined the cast of the television series 7th Heaven, playing Sandy Jameson, best friend to Simon's girlfriend Rose.

In June 2006, Duff joined the Broadway cast of Hairspray, portraying mean girl Amber Von Tussle, and left the role in early October 2006.

Duff has also starred in Material Girls with sister Hilary, where she is credited as co-producer, with her mother and sister credited as producers. Following Material Girls, Duff appeared in various made-for-television or straight-to-DVD films including Nightmare, My Sexiest Year, Legacy, Backwoods, Love Takes Wing, Love Finds a Home and My Nanny's Secret.

Between 2008 and 2015, Duff appeared in various films and TV roles, including; Fear Island, Tug and Slightly Single in L.A. She lent her voice to the animated film Foodfight!, but due to distribution issues, the film was delayed for years until it finally saw a release in 2012. Duff hosted the reality show Legally Blonde: The Musical – The Search for Elle Woods, which searched for an actress to take over the lead role in Legally Blonde: The Musical where she had been in the chorus. She was also listed as an executive producer of the series. Duff's project was the film Badge of Honor in 2015.

=== Music ===
Duff has recorded numerous singles for various soundtracks with her sister, with most of them appearing on the Disneymania discs. Notable soundtracks include: In Search of Santa, The Lizzie McGuire Movie, A Cinderella Story, and Material Girls. She was featured on rapper Kool G Rap's album Half a Klip, providing the background vocals on the track "On the Rise Again" produced by DJ Premier. Duff also sang "A Whatever Life" for the Stuck in the Suburbs soundtrack and "Sweetest Pain" for the Raising Helen soundtrack. She is also featured on song "Babysitting Is a Bum Deal" on the album Family Guy: Live in Las Vegas, singing a duet with Seth MacFarlane as his character Stewie. In addition to singing, Duff has also written and co-written several songs for her sister Hilary's first two studio albums, Metamorphosis and her self titled second album. She also contributed the whistling to Hilary’s song "Sparks" from her album Breathe In. Breathe Out.

After signing with Hollywood Records, Duff planned on releasing "Screwed" in August 2004 as her debut solo single. When Paris Hilton revealed she had also recorded a version for her debut album, Duff claimed that she had procured the rights from the songwriters prior and attempted to block her from releasing the song. Hilton's version was leaked onto radio airplay before their management teams could settle the dispute, and Duff's team decided not to pursue the case further. In 2008, Duff's debut album, Walk the Walk, was scheduled to be released later in the year. The album included "Holiday" as its lead single, "Walk the Walk" as its title track, "Faded", "Crush", and "Just a Minute"; however, it was never released and Duff parted with Hollywood Records. The song "Holiday" was later re-recorded by Hilary Duff and released on her greatest hits album Best of Hilary Duff.

=== Other ventures ===
In 2012 she started her own blog called Real Girl's Kitchen, which was later picked up by the Cooking Channel and made into a show in 2014. In 2013, Duff released her first book called "The Real Girl's Kitchen". In 2017 Haylie started her own children's fashion line called Little Moon Society.

== Personal life ==
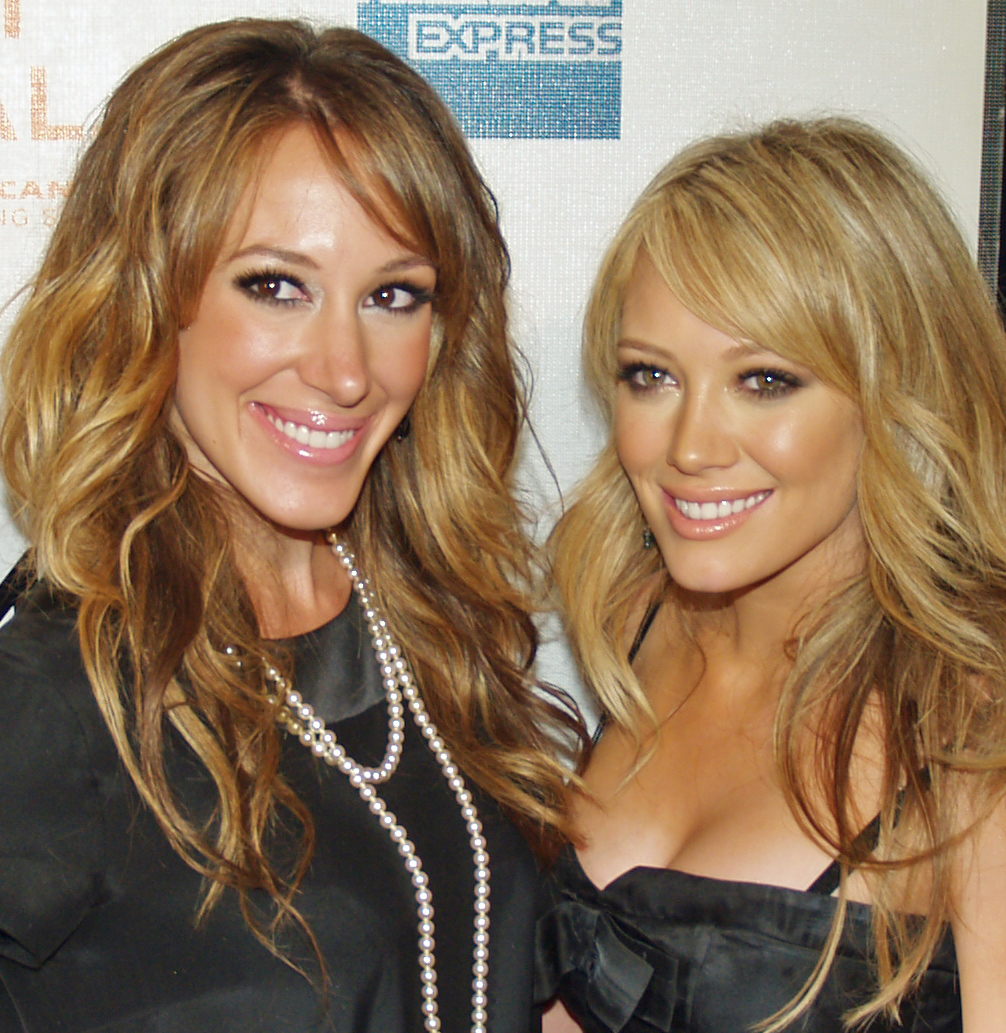
Haylie and Hilary at the premiere of War, Inc., in 2008

In 2009, Duff stated, "I am a Christian, but I also don't really see myself as a religious person. I see myself as more of a spiritual person. There are a lot of things that I do agree with in Christianity and things that I don't agree with. I'm not a regular churchgoer, but I do think that I have my own beliefs that I feel strongly about."

In April 2014, Duff announced her engagement to Matt Rosenberg after a year and a half of dating. She and Rosenberg have two daughters. In April 2026, a representative for Haylie Duff confirmed that she and Matt Rosenberg had called off the engagement.

== Filmography ==
=== Film ===
Haylie Duff theatrical film credits
Year	Title	Role	Notes	Ref.
2003	The Newman Shower	Wendy	Short film	
2003	The Lizzie McGuire Movie	Isabella Parigi (singing voice)		
2004	In Search of Santa	Princess Lucinda		
2004	Napoleon Dynamite	Summer Wheatly		
2005	I Love Your Work	Fran		
2006	Material Girls	Ava Marchetta		
2006	Dishdogz	Cassidy		
2007	My Sexiest Year	Debbie		
2008	Legacy	Lana Stephens	Direct-to-video. Also known as Pretty Little Devils	
2010	Tug	Kim		
2011	Video Girl	Khloe		
2012	Foodfight!	Sweet Cakes	Voice role	
2012	Golden Winter	Rory (voice)		
2012	The Lost Episode	Megan		
2013	Slightly Single in L.A.	Jill		
2013	Taken by Grace	Carrie Everett	Direct-to-video	
2014	The Wedding Pact	Elizabeth Carter		
2014	Muffin Top: A Love Story	Jessica		
2014	A Belle for Christmas	Kate		
2014	The Costume Shop	Jessica		
2015	Desecrated	Allie McClean		
2015	Badge of Honor	Brittany Gallo		
2016	The Adventures of Panda Warrior	GoGo Goat	English dub	
2017	The Sandman	Claire		
2018	The Ladybug	Queenie	Voice role	
2021	The Baby Pact	Elizabeth Becker		
2022	My Sweet Monster	Princess Barbara	Voice role	

=== Television ===
Haylie Duff television credits
Year	Title	Role	Notes	Ref.
1997	True Women	Extra (uncredited)	Television miniseries	
1997	Hope	Martha Jean Pruitt	Television film	
1998	Addams Family Reunion	Gina Adams	Television film	
1999	The Amanda Show	Girl in Crowd	Episode: "Talent Contest"	
2000	Chicago Hope	Jenny	Episode: "Boys Will Be Girls"	
2000	Dreams in the Attic	Jessica	Television film	
2001	Boston Public	Sylvia	Episodes: "Chapter Nine" and "Chapter Sixteen"	
2002–2003	Lizzie McGuire	Amy Sanders	Episodes: "Party Over Here", "Xtreme Xmas" and "Clue-Less"	
2003	Third Watch	Young Faith	Episode: "Collateral Damage: Part 1"	
2003	American Dreams	Shangri-La	Episode: "Change a Comin"	
2004	That's So Raven	Katina	Episode: "He's Got the Power"	
2004	One on One	Mandy	Episode: "Lost in the Headlights"	
2005	Complete Savages	Jessica	Episode: "Save a Dance for Me"	
2005	Joan of Arcadia	Stevie Marx	Recurring role	
2005–2007	7th Heaven	Sandy Jameson	Main role	
2007	Nightmare	Molly Duggan	Television film	
2008	Backwoods	Lee	Television film	
2009	Love Takes Wing	Dr. Annie Nelson	Television film	
2009	Love Finds a Home	Dr. Annie Watson	Television film	
2009	My Nanny's Secret	Claudia	Television film	
2009	Fear Island	Jenna / Megan Anderson	Television film	
2011	Holiday Engagement	Trisha "Trish" Burns	Television film	
2012	Napoleon Dynamite	Summer Wheatly (voice)	Recurring role	
2012	Home Invasion	Jade / Megan	Television film	
2012	The Secret Life of the American Teenager	Attorney	Episode: "Lies and Byes"	
2012	Massholes	Fictional Haylie Duff	Episodes: "Rondo to Garnett" and "Brokeback Boston"	
2012	All About Christmas Eve	Eve Wright	Television film	
2012	Blackout	Suzanne Danfield	Main role	
2013	Christmas Belle	Isabella	Television film	
2013	Hats Off to Christmas!	Mia	Television film	
2014	Sweet Surrender	Chelsea	Television film	
2014	Naughty & Nice	Dr. Sandra Love	Television film	
2014	Til Death Do Us Part	Sarah	Television film	
2014–2015	The Real Girl's Kitchen	Host	24 episodes; also as executive producer (16 episodes)	
2015	His Secret Family	Sarah Goodman	Television film	
2015	Beat Bobby Flay	Mentor	Episode: "Who's Your Daddy?"	
2016	The Bad Twin	Dr. Jennifer Burgess	Television film	
2016	Beat Bobby Flay	Judge	Episode: "Bobby's DMV Appointment"	
2016–2017	Haylie's America	Host	9 episodes	
2017	Hacker	Laura O'Brien	Television film	
2017	Real Rob	Allison	3 episodes	
2017	The Bachelor Next Door	Alex	Television film	
2018	Deadly Delusion (aka The Lease)	Julia McNeil	Television film	
2021	Blending Christmas	Emma	Television film; also executive producer	
2023	Sweet on You	Kate	Television film	
2023	Project Baby	Anna	Television film	
2025	Pretty Hurts	Julie	Television film	
2025	Secret Life of A Good Wife	—N/a	Television film, Director	

=== Stage ===
Year	Title	Role
2006	Hairspray	Amber Von Tussle
2010	Love, Loss, and What I Wore	Amanda

== Discography ==
=== Singles ===
==== As lead artist ====
Title	Year	Peak chart positions		Album
Title	Year	AUS	CAN	Album
"Our Lips Are Sealed" (with Hilary Duff)	2004	8	7	A Cinderella Story

==== As featured artist ====
List of singles
Title	Year	Album
"On the Rise Again" (Kool G Rap featuring Haylie Duff)	2008	Half a Klip

=== Other appearances ===
Title	Year	Other artist(s)	Album
"Same Old Christmas"	2002	Hilary Duff	Santa Claus Lane
"The Siamese Cat Song"	2004	Hilary Duff	Disneymania 2
"Girl in the Band"	2004	—N/a	The Lizzie McGuire Movie
"What Dreams Are Made Of" (Ballad version)	2004	Yani Gellman	The Lizzie McGuire Movie
"Sweetest Pain"	2004	—N/a	Raising Helen
"A Whatever Life"	2004	—N/a	Stuck in the Suburbs
"One in This World"	2004	—N/a	A Cinderella Story
"Babysitting Is a Bum Deal"	2005	Seth MacFarlane	Family Guy: Live in Vegas
"Material Girl"	2006	Hilary Duff	Girl Next Vol.1

=== Music videos ===
List of music videos, showing year released and director
Title	Year	Director
"Our Lips Are Sealed"	2004	Chris Applebaum

=== Songwriting credits ===
Title	Year	Performer	Album	Notes	Ref.
"Sweet Sixteen"	2003	Hilary Duff	Metamorphosis	Co-writer	
"Inner Strength"	2003	Hilary Duff	Metamorphosis	Writer	
"Mr. James Dean"	2004	Hilary Duff	Hilary Duff	Co-writer	
"Haters"	2004	Hilary Duff	Hilary Duff	Co-writer	
"The Last Song"	2004	Hilary Duff	Hilary Duff	Co-writer	
"Gypsy Woman"	2007	Hilary Duff	Dignity	Co-writer	
"Holiday"	2008	Hilary Duff	Best of Hilary Duff	Co-writer	

== Books written ==
Year	Book	Publisher
2013	Real Girl's Kitchen	Rarzobill Books

== Awards and nominations ==
Year	Association	Category	Nominated work	Result
1999	Young Artist Awards	Best Performance in a TV Movie / Pilot / Mini-Series or Series – Supporting Young Actress	Addams Family Reunion	Won
2005	Teen Choice Awards	Choice Movie Breakout Performance – Female	Napoleon Dynamite	Won
2006	Teen Choice Awards	TV – Choice Breakout Star	7th Heaven	Nominated
2014	Stellae Awards	Best Actress	Taken by Grace	Won
