= Metal Tornado =

- Film poster
- Screenplay by: Jason Bourque; Andrew C. Erin
- Story by: Travis Stevens; Gordon Yang
- Directed by: Gordon Yang
- Starring: Lou Diamond Phillips; Nicole de Boer; Greg Evigan; Stephen MacDonald; John MacLaren; Sophie Gendron; Frank Schorpion; Sean Tucker; Robert Reynolds; Todd Duckworth
- Music by: Richard Bowers
- Country of origin: United States
- Original language: English

Production
- Producers: Antony I. Ginnane; Curtis Crawford; Stefan Wodoslawsky
- Cinematography: Bill St. John
- Editor: Marie Lou Gingras
- Running time: 86 mins

Original release
- Release: 2011

Metal Tornado is a 2011 science fiction, thriller television movie directed by Gordon Yang and starring Lou Diamond Phillips. The film was generally poorly received.

== Synopsis ==
Helios World in Chester County, Pennsylvania design a system created by ex-employee Stephen Winters that can convert solar flares into electricity. After some testing he finds a flaw in his design that causes magnetic energy to escape. He phones CEO Jonathan Kane to alert him but Kane ignores his warnings. It produces a stronger magnetic field which causes metal to be attracted to it, and he is killed in the process.

They run a test using the design from an array of satellites which converts solar flares into a magnetic beam which is directed towards their power station. It is successful and stores it, but it forms a temporary magnetic field that sets off car alarms. However, they don't think this is an issue. They celebrate their success, believing it is completely contained, and Jonathan plans a test at their facility in France.

Allysa Winters, Stephen Winters' wife, is interviewed by investigators about her husband's death. She looks into his work and checks out what happened.

Nearby, a lumberjack is cutting trees with a chainsaw when it rises off the ground and flies off. In another scene, a man is riding and stops his motocross bike, but it flies into a magnetic energy vortex which expands.

Michael Edwards notices that 2% of the magnetic energy gathered has been lost. He reports it to Greg, urging him that more testing be done. Kane isn't concerned. Meanwhile, Michael's son Nick Edwards, is writing a paper about the power system and is interested in the power loss. Allysa Winters phones Helios and tries to warn them of their danger.

15 miles away, Stan, a gas station owner, sees the vortex (now resembling a tornado) and his glasses are pulled into it. The vortex starts to damage property. Sheriff Joe Riley investigates the phenomenon and contacts Michael to voice his concerns. Michael and Rebecca arrive to examine it further. They notice that their watches had stopped and their compass is spinning. Rebecca walks with it to see how far the field goes and where it is heading. Michael surmises that the power lost during magnetic energy storage may have created it.

Michael heads to Helios to tell Greg and Jonathan about his theory but they don't believe him. He contacts Ron for help. Michael, the sheriff, Ron and Nick meet at a hospital to talk about two farmers who were injured by it.

Michael, Nick, and Rebecca hack into the Helios security footage to get the proof they need and show it to Greg to urge him to delay the other test, but the test goes ahead.

Michael meets with Allysa Winters about the flaw; she tells him about a potential energy leak and hands over the documentation. He gives it to Greg, who reports it to Jonathan.

Ron figures out that the tornado is following veins of iron ore and is heading towards Henderson town. He advises Rebecca, Michael, and the sheriff to evacuate. Michael contacts Greg and Jonathan, telling them that it's heading towards the town. Soon after, he loses phone signal. He sees the tornado and quickly gets out of his car before it is pulled into the tornado. He hides under a bridge and helps a lady on a motorbike, which falls on top of her, breaking her arm.

In Henderson town, Rebecca and Nick get caught in their car by the tornado and hide in a nearby church basement. Walls of the church collapse and Nick saves Rebecca from falling debris, but fractures his leg in the process.

Michael contacts Ron and finds out it is heading towards Philadelphia. He meets Greg and Jonathan at Helios to find a way to stop it. He thinks an EMP bomb may disrupt it, and they contact the Pentagon to arrange two drones to drop drones into the tornado.

In France, the other team reports that a similar tornado is heading towards Paris, and tries to stop it with an EMP bomb as well. But the tornado reaches the city before the drones do and destroys most of the city, including the Eiffel Tower.

Two drones head towards Philadelphia, but the first one fails. The second drone launches the bomb successfully within the tornado, thereby dissipating the magnetic field and stopping the tornado. Greg reports that the second tornado was also stopped in Paris.

Michael, Rebecca, Nick and Ron have a meal. In the background, the news channels report that Jonathan had accepted responsibility and resigned.

== Cast ==
- Lou Diamond Phillips as Michael Edwards, a scientist at Helios World
- Nicole de Boer as Rebecca, a scientist at Helios World and Michael's partner
- Greg Evigan as Jonathan Kane, the CEO of Helios World
- Stephen MacDonald as Nick Edwards, a student and Michael's Son
- John MacLaren as Ron, a teacher
- Sophie Gendron as Allysa Winters, Stephen Winter's Wife
- Frank Schorpion as Greg, Chief scientist at Helios World
- Sean Tucker as Joe Riley, Sheriff
- Robert Reynolds as Stan Brooks, Gas station owner
- Todd Duckworth as Stephen Winters, an ex-employee at Helios World

== Reception ==
The film received generally poor or very poor reviews. The score card website gave the film 4/10. Crave Online gave it 1.5/10. Disaster Movie gave it 2/5. Starburst gave the film 2/10. BZ Film gave it 4/10 and Radio Times gave it 2/5.
