= My Sweet Monster =

- Theatrical release poster
- Directed by: Viktor Glukhushin; Maksim Volkov
- Written by: Maksim Volkov; Aleksandr Arkhipov (ru); Dmitry Novoselov (ru)
- Produced by: Sergey Selyanov (ru); Georgi Gitis
- Music by: Mikhail Chertishchev (ru); Georgy Zheryakov (ru)
- Color process: Color
- Production companies: CTB Film Company; Skazka Animation Studio; Cinema Fund
- Distributed by: Vlgfilm.ru
- Release dates: October 13, 2021 (Netherlands); April 28, 2022 (Russia)
- Running time: 98 minutes
- Country: Russia
- Language: Russian
- Budget: ₽330 million

My Sweet Monster (Russian: Бука. Моё любимое чудище) is a 2021 Russian animated musical film directed by Viktor Glukhushin and Maksim Volkov. The film was produced by CTB Film Company. The film was released in Russia on April 28, 2022.

The U.S. release of the English dub by Lionsgate features the voices of Haylie Duff, Jon Heder, and Pauly Shore.

== Plot ==
Barbara is a young princess who has always dreamed of marrying a prince, but King Elijah, her father, is unwilling to trust her dreams. While preparing for her 16th birthday, a postman named Bundy Joyce delivers a love letter from Prince Edward to Barbara. Elijah discovers this, and forbids her dreams about Edward. Meanwhile, Joyce forces Elijah into Barbara's marriage in exchange for everything. At her birthday, when Barbara is forced to marry Joyce, she flees the palace, before ending up in a forest. There, she is abducted by a monster named Bogey, accompanied by his rabbit friend, and taken to their hideout.

Barbara gets to know the two, and she convinces them to take her to Edward's palace to marry Edward, which they reluctantly accept. When Barbara and Bogey argue about the forest, he convinces her about Mother Nature, the source of life. That night, as Barbara, Bogey, and the rabbit camp in a cave, the rabbit reveals that Bogey was originally a human who got lost in the forest years ago, but a magic fountain saved his life and transformed him into a monster, before tasking him with protecting the forest. The rabbit also confesses that had a Spark powered heart and was a freak show exhibit who was shunned by many.

Meanwhile, Joyce tells Elijah about Barbara's kidnapping. Elijah explains that he obtained a magic liquid that animates objects to life dubbed "the Spark" from the same fountain 16 years prior to cure Barbara from an illness. Joyce then builds robots with the Spark to eliminate Bogey. The robots track down and pursue Barbara, Bogey and the rabbit, but the three escape. Afterwards, Joyce learns about the fountain, and sets out to find it while having Elijah locked in his workshop.

Barbara, Bogey and the rabbit finally reach Edward's palace, but Bogey suggests that she enters alone. She instead meets Edwardina, who discloses that she created "Edward" and proves that he does not exist, before proceeding to lock Barbara in a hotel room. Bogey realizes about this and arrives to free her.

Joyce and his robots reach the fountain, lure and capture Bogey, the rabbit and Barbara there, and drains the fountain while having Bogey be executed. However, Elijah, having been freed from the workshop by his robots Steven and Theodore, along with his three nannies, intervenes and disables Joyce's robots. Joyce drinks the Spark from a pumping tank, transforming into a monstrous figure. Suddenly, a whirlwind forms above the fountain that that wipes out all of the fountain and sucks in Joyce. With the fountain empty, Barbara's magic starts to fade. Elijah sadly reveals that he built a new heart for her, but was unable to save her mother in time. Bogey decides to step in and calls for Mother Nature to save Barbara's life, sacrificing himself in the process.

Sometime later, Barbara visits the fountain, and tearfully mourns over Bogey for his life. However, in response, the fountain itself is refilled, and Bogey is recovered in his original human form. Barbara reconciles with him for his return.

== Cast ==
Character	Russian	English	
Character	Russian	International	US re-dub
Princess Barbara	Lyubov Aksyonova	¿?	Haylie Duff
Princess Barbara	Violetta Volskaya (singing)	¿?	Haylie Duff
Bogey	Aleksey Chumakov	¿?	Jon Heder
Rabbit	Timur Rodriguez	Josh Wilson	Josh Wilson
Rabbit	Timur Rodriguez	Barrett Leddy (singing)	Barrett Leddy (singing)
Bundy Joyce	Prokhor Chekhovskoy	¿?	Pauly Shore
King Elijah	Maksim Volkov	Martin Cooke	Martin Cooke
Edwardina	Aliona Doletskaya	Olga Gunkina	Olga Gunkina
Yes-Man Eric	Diomid Vinogradov	Martin Cooke	Martin Cooke
Nannies	Maksim Volkov	Olga Gunkina	Olga Gunkina
Robot Stephan	Vladislav Kopp	¿?	¿?
Basil	Petr Ivashchenko	¿?	¿?
Postmaster	Petr Ivashchenko	¿?	¿?

== Reception ==
Common Sense Media said that "The songs are fine. Though the story is a little complex, it eventually comes together for a decent yet abrupt fairy-tale ending. Overall, it's standard stuff that most kids have seen before."
