= The Wedding Pact =

- Theatrical release poster
- Directed by: Matt Berman
- Written by: Matt Berman
- Produced by: Courtney Brin; Eric Scott Woods
- Starring: Haylie Duff; Chris Soldevilla
- Cinematography: Keith L. Smith
- Edited by: James Perry
- Music by: Scott Glasgow
- Distributed by: Phase 4 Films
- Release date: February 25, 2014
- Running time: 92 minutes
- Country: United States
- Language: English

The Wedding Pact is a 2014 American romantic comedy film directed by Matt Berman and starring Haylie Duff and Chris Soldevilla. The film was released on DVD on February 3, 2014. A sequel, The Baby Pact, premiered in 2021.

== Plot ==
Mitch and Elizabeth get to know and befriend each other in college. Mitch falls in love with Elizabeth, but decides not to tell her. After college, Elizabeth throws a phrase that if after 10 years neither of them finds a partner in life, they will marry. After ten years, Mitch hasn't gotten married and discovers that Elizabeth hasn't either. Still remembering their promise, Mitch makes a cross country journey to visit Elizabeth.

== Cast ==
- Haylie Duff as Elizabeth Carter
- Chris Soldevilla as Mitch
- Angie Everhart as Laura
- Leslie Easterbrook as Donna
- Scott Michael Campbell as Jake Jones
- Joyce Hyser as Sally
- Alison Becker as Date #3

== Critical reception ==
Common Sense Media said, "The Wedding Pact wants to be a Judd Apatow flick's blend of crassness, immaturity, and heart, but it only scores on the first two counts. Here, we have a series of unlikable male characters who seem barely interested in women as people, until Mitch decides he's totally alone and should have gone after the woman of his dreams 10 years ago. What follows feels like an imitation of better films with better actors with better chemistry, without the likability and energy. What's left is an empty, formulaic film that trades on excessive drinking, with most women as distractions and people making bad choices. Haylie Duff as Elizabeth has a genuine warmth and amiability, but it cannot save the tone-deafness of the rest of this film, which at best offers a good example of how not to be as a person."
