= Ellen Meijers =

Dutch video game music composer

Ellen Meijers is a Dutch video game music composer and audio designer who worked for such companies as Apple Inc., LucasArts, Oddworld Inhabitants and Crystal Dynamics.

== Education ==
- The Royal College of Art, England 1994–1995 Master of Arts: Interactive Multi Media
- Utrecht School of the Arts, The Netherlands 1991–1995 Music Technology: Computer Composition & Sound Design
- University of Utrecht, The Netherlands 1989–1994 Master's Degree in Musicology: 20th Century Composition

== Awards ==
Her first notable achievement was the earning of the Highest Honors in International Piano Competition (Antwerp, Belgium — 1988).

In 1995 she won the Adobe-award for the most professional project shown at the Royal College of Art exhibition.

She also won the Editors' Choice Award for Best Sound (Oddworld: Abe's Oddysee — 1997) and was a finalist for the first Interactive Achievement Award for Outstanding Achievement in Sound and Music (Oddworld: Abe's Exoddus — 1998).

== Video game soundtracks ==
=== Apple Inc. ===
- Maze
- Texas Hold'em
- Test Prep
- Klondike
- iQuiz

=== Crystal Dynamics ===
- 3D Baseball

=== LucasArts ===
- Lego Star Wars II: The Original Trilogy
- Star Wars: Empire at War
- Star Wars: Battlefront II
- Star Wars: Episode III Revenge of the Sith
- Mercenaries: Playground of Destruction
- Secret Weapons Over Normandy
- Armed and Dangerous
- RTX Red Rock

=== Oddworld Inhabitants ===
- Oddworld: Abe's Oddysee
- Oddworld: Abe's Exoddus
- Oddworld: Munch's Oddysee
- Oddworld: New 'n' Tasty

=== Gazillion Entertainment ===
- Marvel Heroes

=== The Greater Bay Area Make-A-Wish Foundation ===
- Ben's Game
