= D.I.C.E. Award for Outstanding Achievement in Art Direction =

Annual award presented by the Academy of Interactive Arts & Sciences

- Country: United States
- Presented by: Academy of Interactive Arts & Sciences
- First award: 1998
- Currently held by: Clair Obscur: Expedition 33
- Website: interactive.org

The D.I.C.E. Award for Outstanding Achievement in Art Direction is an award presented annually by the Academy of Interactive Arts & Sciences during the D.I.C.E. Awards. This award is "presented to the individual or team whose work represents the highest level of achievement in designing a unified graphic look for an interactive title". Creative/technical Academy members with expertise as an artist, animator or programmer are qualified to vote for this award.

The award's most recent winner is Clair Obscur: Expedition 33, developed by Sandfall Interactive and published by Kepler Interactive.

== Art Direction & Animation ==
The Academy originally offered Outstanding Achievement in Art/Graphics at the first two annual awards ceremonies. This would be separated into the categories of Outstanding Achievement in Art Direction and Outstanding Achievement in Animation at the third annual awards ceremony. Since the categories separated, roughly half of the finalists and winners for "Art Direction" and "Animation" were the same game within its respective release year. The games that had won both awards for "Art Direction" and "Animation" were:

- Final Fantasy VIII
- Final Fantasy IX
- Sly Cooper and the Thievius Raccoonus
- Half-Life 2
- Gears of War
- Uncharted 2: Among Thieves
- Uncharted 3: Drake's Deception
- The Last of Us
- Ori and the Blind Forest
- Cuphead
- Ratchet & Clank: Rift Apart
- God of War Ragnarök

The games that won the "Art Direction" award but were not finalists in the "Animation" category were:

- Ico
- The Legend of Zelda: The Wind Waker
- BioShock
- LittleBigPlanet
- Journey
- Monument Valley
- Control
- Ghost of Tsushima
- Alan Wake 2
- Black Myth: Wukong
- Clair Obscur: Expedition 33

2022 was the only year that the "Art Direction" and "Animation" categories had the same five finalists and winner. 2025 was the only year that the two categories did not have any of the same finalists.

== Winners and nominees ==
=== 1990s ===
Table key
Indicates the winner

Year	Game	Developer(s)	Publisher(s)	Ref.
1997/1998 (Note: Presented as Outstanding Achievement in Art/Graphics.) (1st)	Riven: The Sequel to Myst	Cyan Worlds	Red Orb Entertainment	
1997/1998 (1st)	Blade Runner	Westwood Studios	Virgin Interactive	
1997/1998 (1st)	Final Fantasy VII	SquareSoft	Sony Computer Entertainment	
1997/1998 (1st)	GoldenEye 007	Rare	Nintendo	
1997/1998 (1st)	Oddworld: Abe's Oddysee	Oddworld Inhabitants	GT Interactive	
1997/1998 (1st)	The Curse of Monkey Island	LucasArts	LucasArts	
1998/1999 (2nd)	Banjo-Kazooie	Rare	Nintendo	
1998/1999 (2nd)	Grim Fandango	LucasArts	LucasArts	
1998/1999 (2nd)	Half-Life	Valve	Sierra On-Line	
1998/1999 (2nd)	Spyro the Dragon	Insomniac Games	Sony Computer Entertainment	
1999/2000 (3rd)	Final Fantasy VIII	SquareSoft	Square Electronic Arts	
1999/2000 (3rd)	Disney's Villains' Revenge	Disney Interactive	Disney Interactive	
1999/2000 (3rd)	Pharaoh	Impressions Games	Sierra On-Line	
1999/2000 (3rd)	Spyro 2: Ripto's Rage!	Insomniac Games	Sony Computer Entertainment	
1999/2000 (3rd)	The Sims	Maxis	Electronic Arts	

=== 2000s ===
Year	Game	Developer(s)	Publisher(s)	Ref.
2000 (4th)	Final Fantasy IX	SquareSoft	Square Electronic Arts	
2000 (4th)	Escape from Monkey Island	LucasArts	LucasArts	
2000 (4th)	Jet Grind Radio	Smilebit	Sega	
2000 (4th)	Spyro: Year of the Dragon	Insomniac Games	Sony Computer Entertainment	
2001 (5th)	Ico	Japan Studio	Sony Computer Entertainment	
2001 (5th)	Halo: Combat Evolved	Bungie	Microsoft Game Studios	
2001 (5th)	Metal Gear Solid 2: Sons of Liberty	Konami	Konami	
2001 (5th)	Oddworld: Munch's Oddysee	Oddworld Inhabitants	Microsoft Game Studios	
2001 (5th)	Star Wars Rogue Squadron II: Rogue Leader	Factor 5	LucasArts	
2002 (6th)	Sly Cooper and the Thievius Raccoonus	Sucker Punch Productions	Sony Computer Entertainment	
2002 (6th)	Eternal Darkness: Sanity's Requiem	Silicon Knights	Nintendo	
2002 (6th)	Kingdom Hearts	SquareSoft	Square Electronic Arts	
2002 (6th)	Metroid Prime	Retro Studios	Nintendo	
2002 (6th)	Ratchet & Clank	Insomniac Games	Sony Computer Entertainment	
2003 (7th)	The Legend of Zelda: The Wind Waker	Nintendo EAD	Nintendo	
2003 (7th)	Final Fantasy X-2	SquareSoft	Square Electronic Arts	
2003 (7th)	Jak II	Naughty Dog	Sony Computer Entertainment	
2003 (7th)	Prince of Persia: The Sands of Time	Ubisoft Montreal	Ubisoft	
2003 (7th)	Ratchet & Clank: Going Commando	Insomniac Games	Sony Computer Entertainment	
2004 (8th)	Half-Life 2	Valve	Vivendi Universal Games	
2004 (8th)	Doom 3	id Software	Activision	
2004 (8th)	Metroid Prime 2: Echoes	Retro Studios	Nintendo	
2004 (8th)	Prince of Persia: Warrior Within	Ubisoft Montreal	Ubisoft	
2004 (8th)	Sly 2: Band of Thieves	Sucker Punch Productions	Sony Computer Entertainment	
2005 (9th)	Shadow of the Colossus	Japan Studio	Sony Computer Entertainment	
2005 (9th)	God of War	Santa Monica Studio	Sony Computer Entertainment	
2005 (9th)	Jade Empire	BioWare	Microsoft Game Studios	
2005 (9th)	King Kong	Ubisoft Montpellier	Ubisoft	
2005 (9th)	Ultimate Spider-Man	Treyarch	Activision	
2006 (10th)	Gears of War	Epic Games	Microsoft Game Studios	
2006 (10th)	Call of Duty 3	Treyarch	Activision	
2006 (10th)	Final Fantasy XII	Square Enix	Square Enix	
2006 (10th)	Tom Clancy's Rainbow Six: Vegas	Ubisoft Montreal	Ubisoft	
2006 (10th)	Viva Piñata	Rare	Microsoft Game Studios	
2007 (11th)	BioShock	2K Boston, 2K Australia	2K Games	
2007 (11th)	Assassin's Creed	Ubisoft Montreal	Ubisoft	
2007 (11th)	Call of Duty 4: Modern Warfare	Infinity Ward	Activision	
2007 (11th)	Heavenly Sword	Ninja Theory	Sony Computer Entertainment	
2007 (11th)	Team Fortress 2	Valve	Valve, Electronic Arts	
2008 (12th)	LittleBigPlanet	Media Molecule	Sony Computer Entertainment	
2008 (12th)	Dead Space	EA Redwood Shores	Electronic Arts	
2008 (12th)	Fable II	Lionhead Studios	Microsoft Game Studios	
2008 (12th)	Mirror's Edge	DICE	Electronic Arts	
2008 (12th)	Prince of Persia	Ubisoft Montreal	Ubisoft	
2009 (13th)	Uncharted 2: Among Thieves	Naughty Dog	Sony Computer Entertainment	
2009 (13th)	Assassin's Creed II	Ubisoft Montreal	Ubisoft	
2009 (13th)	Call of Duty: Modern Warfare 2	Infinity Ward	Activision	
2009 (13th)	Machinarium	Amanita Design	Amanita Design	
2009 (13th)	Resident Evil 5	Capcom	Capcom	

=== 2010s ===
Year	Game	Developer(s)	Publisher(s)	Ref.
2010 (14th)	Red Dead Redemption	Rockstar San Diego	Rockstar Games	
2010 (14th)	Alan Wake	Remedy Entertainment	Microsoft Game Studios	
2010 (14th)	Enslaved: Odyssey to the West	Ninja Theory	Namco Bandai Games	
2010 (14th)	God of War III	Santa Monica Studio	Sony Computer Entertainment	
2010 (14th)	Kirby's Epic Yarn	HAL Laboratory, Good-Feel	Nintendo	
2011 (15th)	Uncharted 3: Drake's Deception	Naughty Dog	Sony Computer Entertainment	
2011 (15th)	Batman: Arkham City	Rocksteady Studios	Warner Bros. Interactive Entertainment	
2011 (15th)	Battlefield 3	DICE	Electronic Arts	
2011 (15th)	Portal 2	Valve	Valve	
2011 (15th)	Rayman Origins	Ubisoft Montpellier	Ubisoft	
2012 (16th)	Journey	Thatgamecompany	Sony Computer Entertainment	
2012 (16th)	Borderlands 2	Gearbox Software	2K Games	
2012 (16th)	Dishonored	Arkane Studios	Bethesda Softworks	
2012 (16th)	Far Cry 3	Ubisoft Montreal	Ubisoft	
2012 (16th)	Halo 4	343 Industries	Microsoft Studios	
2013 (17th)	The Last of Us	Naughty Dog	Sony Computer Entertainment	
2013 (17th)	BioShock Infinite	Irrational Games	2K Games	
2013 (17th)	Puppeteer	Japan Studio	Sony Computer Entertainment	
2013 (17th)	Rayman Legends	Ubisoft Montpellier	Ubisoft	
2013 (17th)	Tearaway	Media Molecule	Sony Computer Entertainment	
2014 (18th)	Monument Valley	ustwo	ustwo	
2014 (18th)	Assassin's Creed Unity	Ubisoft Montreal	Ubisoft	
2014 (18th)	Sunset Overdrive	Insomniac Games	Microsoft Studios	
2014 (18th)	The Vanishing of Ethan Carter	The Astronauts	The Astronauts	
2014 (18th)	Valiant Hearts: The Great War	Ubisoft Montpellier	Ubisoft	
2015 (19th)	Ori and the Blind Forest	Moon Studios	Microsoft Studios	
2015 (19th)	Lara Croft Go	Square Enix Montreal	Square Enix Europe	
2015 (19th)	Rise of the Tomb Raider	Crystal Dynamics	Square Enix Europe	
2015 (19th)	Star Wars Battlefront	DICE	Electronic Arts	
2015 (19th)	The Order: 1886	Ready at Dawn	Sony Computer Entertainment	
2016 (20th)	Inside	Playdead	Playdead	
2016 (20th)	Battlefield 1	DICE	Electronic Arts	
2016 (20th)	Firewatch	Campo Santo	Campo Santo	
2016 (20th)	The Last Guardian	Japan Studio, GenDesign	Sony Interactive Entertainment	
2016 (20th)	Uncharted 4: A Thief's End	Naughty Dog	Sony Interactive Entertainment	
2017 (21st)	Cuphead	Studio MDHR	Studio MDHR	
2017 (21st)	Hellblade: Senua's Sacrifice	Ninja Theory	Ninja Theory	
2017 (21st)	Horizon Zero Dawn	Guerrilla Games	Sony Interactive Entertainment	
2017 (21st)	Little Nightmares	Tarsier Studios	Bandai Namco Entertainment	
2017 (21st)	The Legend of Zelda: Breath of the Wild	Nintendo EPD	Nintendo	
2018 (22nd)	God of War	Santa Monica Studio	Sony Interactive Entertainment	
2018 (22nd)	Detroit: Become Human	Quantic Dream	Sony Interactive Entertainment	
2018 (22nd)	Gris	Nomada Studio	Devolver Digital	
2018 (22nd)	Marvel's Spider-Man	Insomniac Games	Sony Interactive Entertainment	
2018 (22nd)	Red Dead Redemption 2	Rockstar Games	Rockstar Games	
2019 (23rd)	Control	Remedy Entertainment	505 Games	
2019 (23rd)	Call of Duty: Modern Warfare	Infinity Ward	Activision	
2019 (23rd)	Concrete Genie	Pixelopus	Sony Interactive Entertainment	
2019 (23rd)	Death Stranding	Kojima Productions	Sony Interactive Entertainment	
2019 (23rd)	Resident Evil 2	Capcom	Capcom	

=== 2020s ===
Year	Game	Developer(s)	Publisher(s)	Ref.
2020 (24th)	Ghost of Tsushima	Sucker Punch Productions	Sony Interactive Entertainment	
2020 (24th)	Hades	Supergiant Games	Supergiant Games	
2020 (24th)	The Last of Us Part II	Naughty Dog	Sony Interactive Entertainment	
2020 (24th)	Marvel's Spider-Man: Miles Morales	Insomniac Games	Sony Interactive Entertainment	
2020 (24th)	Ori and the Will of the Wisps	Moon Studios	Xbox Game Studios	
2021 (25th)	Ratchet & Clank: Rift Apart	Insomniac Games	Sony Interactive Entertainment	
2021 (25th)	Call of Duty: Vanguard	Sledgehammer Games	Activision	
2021 (25th)	Deathloop	Arkane Studios	Bethesda Softworks	
2021 (25th)	Kena: Bridge of Spirits	Ember Lab	Ember Lab	
2021 (25th)	Resident Evil Village	Capcom	Capcom	
2022 (26th)	God of War Ragnarök	Santa Monica Studio	Sony Interactive Entertainment	
2022 (26th)	Call of Duty: Modern Warfare II	Infinity Ward	Activision	
2022 (26th)	Horizon Forbidden West	Guerrilla Games	Sony Interactive Entertainment	
2022 (26th)	Stray	BlueTwelve Studios	Annapurna Interactive	
2022 (26th)	The Callisto Protocol	Striking Distance Studios	Krafton	
2023 (27th)	Alan Wake 2	Remedy Entertainment	Epic Games	
2023 (27th)	Hogwarts Legacy	Avalanche Software	Warner Bros. Games	
2023 (27th)	Marvel's Spider-Man 2	Insomniac Games	Sony Interactive Entertainment	
2023 (27th)	Star Wars Jedi: Survivor	Respawn Entertainment	Electronic Arts	
2023 (27th)	Starfield	Bethesda Game Studios	Bethesda Softworks	
2024 (28th)	Black Myth: Wukong	Game Science	Game Science	
2024 (28th)	Indiana Jones and the Great Circle	MachineGames	Bethesda Softworks	
2024 (28th)	Lego Horizon Adventures	Guerrilla Games, Studio Gobo	Sony Interactive Entertainment	
2024 (28th)	The Plucky Squire	All Possible Futures	Devolver Digital	
2024 (28th)	Senua's Saga: Hellblade II	Ninja Theory	Xbox Game Studios	
2025 (29th)	Clair Obscur: Expedition 33	Sandfall Interactive	Kepler Interactive	
2025 (29th)	Death Stranding 2: On the Beach	Kojima Productions	Sony Interactive Entertainment	
2025 (29th)	Dispatch	AdHoc Studio	AdHoc Studio	
2025 (29th)	Ghost of Yōtei	Sucker Punch Productions	Sony Interactive Entertainment	
2025 (29th)	The Midnight Walk	MoonHood	Fast Travel Games	

== Multiple nominations and wins ==
=== Developers and Publishers ===
Sony has published the most nominees and winners in this category; Sony also has published games with multiple back-to-back wins, yet with different developers. The only other publisher with back-to-back wins has been Square Electronic Arts. Nintendo and Microsoft have published two non-consecutive wins each. Sony, Nintendo, Microsoft, Ubisoft, and Square Enix Europe have the distinction of publishing multiple nominees within the same year. Ubisoft is the most nominated publisher without a win in this category (12 nominations, 0 win).

Several of Sony's developing subsidiaries have developed multiple nominees and winners. Insomniac Games has developed the most nominees, but only one of its nominated games has won (Ratchet & Clank: Rift Apart). Sony subsidiary Naughty Dog is the studio who has developed the most winners in this category. Sony's second party studios Sucker Punch Productions and Santa Monica Studio, as well as Sony's in-house Japan Studio, have all won this award category twice. The only developer with back-to-back wins has been SquareSoft. Ubisoft Montreal is the most nominated developer without a single win in this category (8 nominations, 0 win).

Developers
Developer	Nominations	Wins
Naughty Dog	6	3
SquareSoft/Square Enix	6	2
Japan Studio	4	2
Santa Monica Studio	4	2
Sucker Punch Productions	4	2
Remedy Entertainment	3	2
Insomniac Games	10	1
Valve	4	1
Rare	3	1
Media Molecule	2	1
Moon Studios	2	1
Nintendo EAD/EPD	2	1
Ubisoft Montreal	8	0
DICE	4	0
Infinity Ward	4	0
Ninja Theory	4	0
Ubisoft Montpellier	4	0
LucasArts	3	0
Capcom	3	0
Guerrilla Games	3	0
2K Boston/Irrational Games	2	0
Arkane Studios	2	0
Bethesda Softworks	2	0
Kojima Productions	2	0
Retro Studios	2	0
Treyarch	2	0

Publishers
Publisher	Nominations	Wins
Sony Computer/Interactive Entertainment	40	12
Electronic Arts	12	2
Microsoft/Xbox Game Studios	11	2
Nintendo	8	2
SquareSoft/Square Enix	5	2
Rockstar Games	2	1
Ubisoft	12	0
Activision	7	0
LucasArts	4	0
2K Games	3	0
Bandai Namco Entertainment	3	0
Bethesda Softworks	3	0
Capcom	3	0
Devolver Digital	2	0
Oddworld Inhabitants	2	0
Sierra On-Line	2	0
Square Enix Europe	2	0
Valve	2	0

=== Franchises ===
The most nominated franchises are Call of Duty (six nominations) and Final Fantasy (five nominations). Final Fantasy, God of War, and Uncharted are the only franchises to have won more than once. The Call of Duty franchise has not won any award in this category despite receiving the most nominations.

Franchises
Franchises	Nominations	Wins
Final Fantasy	5	2
God of War	4	2
Uncharted	3	2
Ratchet & Clank	3	1
Alan Wake	2	1
BioShock	2	1
Ghost	2	1
Half-Life	2	1
The Last of Us	2	1
The Legend of Zelda	2	1
Ori	2	1
Red Dead	2	1
Sly Cooper	2	1
Call of Duty	6	0
Spider-Man	4	0
Assassin's Creed	3	0
Horizon	3	0
Prince of Persia	3	0
Resident Evil	3	0
Star Wars	3	0
Spyro	3	0
Battlefield	2	0
Death Stranding	2	0
Halo	2	0
Hellblade	2	0
Metroid	2	0
Monkey Island	2	0
Oddworld	2	0
Rayman	2	0
