= Soulstorm =

Soulstorm may refer to:

- Oddworld: Soulstorm
- Warhammer 40,000: Dawn of War – Soulstorm
