= Slig =

Slig may refer to any of the following fictional creatures:

- Slig (Dune), a slug-pig hybrid in Frank Herbert's Dune universe
- Slig (Dungeons & Dragons), a creature in the Dragonlance universe of novels and related media, and also the dark sun setting.
- Sligs (Marvel Comics), an alien race encountered by Marvel Comics' Fantastic Four superhero team
- A creature in the Oddworld video game universe
- A member of Deep Six, a group of DC Comics villains
