= Oddworld: Soulstorm =

2021 video game

- Developer: Oddworld Inhabitants (Note: Additional work was done by Fat Kraken Studios, Titanium Studios, Frima Studio, Sabotage Studio, Big Boat Interactive, Free Range Games, Superseed Studios, Streamline Media Group Inc, System Studios, Pocket Sized Hands.)
- Publisher: Oddworld Inhabitants
- Director: Lorne Lanning
- Producer: Bennie Terry III
- Writer: Lorne Lanning
- Composer: Josh Gabriel
- Series: Oddworld
- Engine: Unity
- Platforms: PlayStation 4; PlayStation 5; Windows; Xbox One; Xbox Series X/S; Nintendo Switch
- Release: PlayStation 4, PlayStation 5, Windows; April 6, 2021; Enhanced Edition; PlayStation 4, PlayStation 5, Windows, Xbox One, Xbox Series X/S; November 30, 2021; Oddtimized Edition; Nintendo Switch; November 18, 2022
- Genre: Cinematic platform
- Mode: Single-player

Oddworld: Soulstorm is a 2021 platform game developed and published by Oddworld Inhabitants. The game is the sequel to 2014's Oddworld: New 'n' Tasty! and a re-imagining of 1998's Oddworld: Abe's Exoddus as it was originally envisioned. It was released for PlayStation 4, PlayStation 5, and Windows in April 2021, with an enhanced edition released in November 2021, alongside versions for Xbox One and Xbox Series X/S. A port for Nintendo Switch, subtitled Oddtimized Edition, was released in November 2022. It received mixed reviews from critics.

== Gameplay ==
Similar to its predecessor, Oddworld: Soulstorm is a 2.5D side-scrolling platform game. Protagonist of the Oddworld series Abe returns as the primary character, with the goal of rescuing his fellow Mudokons from slave labor and exploitation by the brutal Glukkons. The game features substantially revised gameplay mechanics from New 'n' Tasty while also incorporating gameplay elements from both Oddworld: Abe's Exoddus and Oddworld: Munch's Oddysee.

One new mechanic is an inventory to go along with a new looting and crafting system in which Abe can find various items within interactive objects, or pickpocket them from enemies, and craft and customize different weapons, such as a smoke bomb or a flamethrower; one such lootable item is duct tape, which Abe can use to "apprehend" enemies without killing them. Moolah can also be collected with which to purchase items for the inventory or to open cash gates. Abe is now capable of performing a double jump, allowing him to get across large gaps, and his throwing mechanic from New 'n' Tasty has been modified so that he can move around whilst aiming. A new health meter tracks how much health Abe has left, and can be recovered either over time, from rescuing Mudokons or by collecting often-hidden Royal Jellies, the latter of which will extend the meter. Certain hazards will still kill him instantly however regardless of how much health he has left.

The Quarma system now has an additional tally that counts the number of enemies killed, therefore encouraging the player to either kill or spare enemies, though this doesn't count against a level's overall Quarma rating. The GameSpeak feature has been simplified to greeting other Mudokons and telling them to wait and functions similarly to that in Munch's Oddysee, with simply tapping or holding the corresponding button causing Abe to speak to either one or all Mudokons following him, as well as "Aggro" and "Passive" commands that change his followers' mood similarly to that game's "Jump 'Em!" command (if in Aggro mood, they'll throw any items given to them from the inventory at enemies). Abe's possession ability from his previous appearances has also been completely reworked; while it functions similarly to its Munch's Oddysee incarnation, being a small ball of energy which the player controls, it now uses a "chi" meter that limits the amount of time/distance for Abe to move it to his nearest target with the amount of "chi" extended based on how many Mudokons are following him at the time and when dispossessing enemies, he can now either cause them to explode as before or temporarily knock them out. Mudokons now follow every move Abe makes when they follow him, including jumping and hoisting, with running and sneaking also adjusting their voice and movement volume accordingly. Enemies are now capable of shooting at Abe or other Mudokons at different angles and can use various weaponry that cause various amounts of damage. They can also switch these out with stun guns, which can be utilised by the player to harmlessly knock out other enemies. While the game is mostly linear, the levels are often quite large and contain many secret areas, rewarding the player for thoroughly exploring them. Each level features a badge system for completing specific tasks, such as looting a specific number of interactive items, finding a specific number of secret areas, or apprehending as many enemies as possible.

The Enhanced Edition features two version-exclusive bonus levels; Vykkers Labs for the Xbox versions and Toby's Escape for the PlayStation and Epic Games Store versions.

== Story ==
=== Setting ===
Oddworld: Soulstorm is set hours following the events of Oddworld: New 'n Tasty. In the previous installment, the RuptureFarms janitor Mudokon named Abe accidentally stumbled across a scheme engineered by his CEO, Molluck the Glukkon, to turn all Mudokon laborers into an edible product to compensate for the sales' decline of other meat-based treats, provoked by the dwindling of available animals for processing (one of which already went extinct).

Frightened at learning he may become a target for harvesting, Abe escaped RuptureFarms and came across the free Mudokon shaman Big Face of the Monsaic Lines (a haven for free Mudokons), who elaborates his destiny is to save his enslaved brethren and shut off RuptureFarms permanently. For this, Big Face has Abe pass through a series of trials, branding each of Abe's hands when he's successful, granting him the power of the Shrykull (a divine amalgamation of the native Scrabs and Paramites).

Abe uses his power to return to RuptureFarms, rescue all Mudokons and shut down the factory, but is forced to stay behind to shut off the poisonous gas Molluck activated as an emergency measure, in which he's captured. On the verge of being sent to a meat grinder, however, Abe is saved by the free Mudokons who launch a lightning storm at RuptureFarms, destroying the factory, killing the Slig carrying out the execution and zapping Molluck unconscious. Abe is then rescued by Big Face and taken to the Monsaic lines, being hailed as a hero.

Aside from the protagonist, returning characters from New 'N Tasty include Molluck and Alf (an original secondary character from Oddworld: Abe's Exoddus who became a protagonist of New 'N Tasty's "Alf's Escape" DLC) and Monsaic Lines is revisited in the prologue. Being a re-imagining of Abe's Exoddus, only two characters of the original product, Vice-president Aslik and the Brewmaster, are reintroduced and only the levels of the Necrum Mines, the Slig Barracks, FeeCo Depot and Soulstorm Brewery are revisited. Four new characters - The Necrum Mines' Baron Morguer, the elder Mudokon known as The Keeper, a nameless Mudokon shaman at the prologue (which is not Big Face) and the Mudokon train engineer Toby - are introduced as also are new levels, such as the Necrum catacombs and a suspended monorail FeeCo Train.

=== Plot ===
While the freed Mudokons from RuptureFarms celebrate their release, Abe consults with a shaman who urges him to cut away his lip-stitches to "find his voice", but Abe refuses to do so as he recalls the stitches are the last memory of his mother, Sam. At the same time, the Monsaic Lines is bombarded by the surviving Sligs from RuptureFarms, led by a vengeful Molluck, vilified by the Magog Cartel for 'destroying his own factory for the insurance money'. Abe and the surviving Mudokons led by Alf run away to safety. As Abe escapes, he comes across a Mudokon escapee - the same one seen in the introduction - slowly dying from a gunshot wound, who urges Abe to save all of them while giving him a wrapped package, telling him to find someone named "the Keeper".

Abe departs to acquire a FeeCo train that can lead the free Mudokons to safety. Amidst the way, especially within the abandoned mines of the Sorrow Valley, Abe comes across Mudokon escapees who became mysteriously ill while also coming across another dead Mudokon who carried a video-cassette tape, with a letter urging Abe to see it. Despite the pursuit from Molluck's Sligs and blimp, Abe reaches the Phat station and hijacks the train, using it to pick up Alf, the Monsaic Lines' survivors and any Mudokons Abe comes across.

At the train, Abe confides to Alf his findings, including the wrapped package - which is a map to the Necrum Mines and an amber amulet with a Quarma-based creature - and the tape, which Alf tells can be viewed at a communications tower in the Slig Barracks, which is the train's next stop. Infiltrating the communications tower, Abe watches to the tape, which is revealed to be a project showcase for SoulStorm Brew, revealed to be an addictive drink meant to cause dependency on Mudokons - keeping the workforce loyal - which also acts as a poison which can cause lethal side-effects if not continuously imbibed within 48 hours. Realizing the danger, Abe urges Alf to head to Necrum so he can find the Keeper.

Infiltrating Necrum Mines, Abe travels deep within until he reaches the large, underground chamber of elder Mudokons, all encased in amber, where he comes across the Keeper whom puts Abe to a trial - recovering the gemstone "Stone of the Fragon's Eye" within a Sleech-infested catacomb. As Abe succeeds, the Keeper directs him to the center of the chamber, where he places the stone in a pedestal that brands Abe's chest with lightning; at the same time, he acquires the memories of the elder Mudokons. Abe is informed by the Keeper he must 'taint the brew', using the antidote ingredients he acquired at the Sorrow Valley to heal the ill Mudokons.

As Abe discloses his revelations to Alf, they come up with the plan to mix the antidote into Soulstorm Brewery and Toby gives the idea of raiding the FeeCo Depot to acquire the containers with the antidote ingredients that will allow mass production of the antidote. Abe performs the raid, identifying and taking the containers, but the train leaves the depot under heavy fire from pursuing Sligs.

The outcome, from this point, is heavily dependent on the player's overall Quarma (which must amount to at least 80% of all Mudokons rescued in at least twelve levels up to that point). Post-credit scenes for each ending further amplify, via newspaper headlines, the aftermath of each outcome as well, again dependent on the overall Quarma.

- If the Quarma isn't satisfactory, the bad ending shows Abe attempting to access the amber amulet only for the creature within to shatter itself in pieces, disheartening him. Abe then accidentally spills a whole crate of SoulStorm Brew, whose sparks from the overactive furnace hit and burn everyone within. The burning train rams the SoulStorm Brewery, demolishing it completely. The bad ending concludes when Mullock is forced to go into hiding in the Yaymans, while killing his Slig blimp pilot in the process. Furthermore, without the brewery, there are no more Soulstorm Brews in the future to keep the enslaved Mudokons alive, killing them all eventually and creating a labor crisis.
- If the Quarma is satisfactory, Abe accesses the amulet successfully which uses the chest tattoo to unleash his full Shrykull power. This allows the train to breach through the Brewery's gates, killing all intercepting and guarding Sligs and allowing Abe to infiltrate the facility, using the humongous mixing machine to distribute the ingredients and deliver the antidote across all factories in Mudos. In the good ending following that, Morguer and Aslik (the Glukkons running Necrum Mines and FeeCo Depot respectively) confront the Brewmaster on the 'failing' SoulStorm Brew which they believe is causing the Mudokon uprisings, unaware it was all caused by Abe. When the Brewmaster tries convincing both it was Molluck to blame, believing he is using the Mudokons from RuptureFarms as an army, Molluck overhears this and uses his Slig pilot to bribe both Morguer and Aslik's personal Sligs - disgruntled for being denied overtime and bonuses - to his command, to execute Morguer, Aslik and the Brewmaster, before escaping with Molluck to the Yaymans, inadvertently allowing Abe and his Followers to escape the Brewery. Hours later, Abe, Alf and the follower Mudokons gather for a rest at night as Abe confides more of his findings from meeting the Keeper, above all the revelation that Sam, Abe's mother, is in fact the mother of all the Mudokons from RuptureFarms. Determined to know why she left all of them under the clutches of the Glukkons, as well as the reason why she ever stitched Abe's lips, Abe is determined to travel to the Glukkon capital of Nolybab to find her. At the same time, the amulet starts glowing again as the story closes.

== Development and release ==
In April 2015, Oddworld's co-founder, and director of Oddworld: Abe's Exoddus, Lorne Lanning announced on a live stream with Kinda Funny Games that a full remake of Abe's Exoddus would be the next Oddworld project. Lanning also stated that the project's success would contribute significantly to future Oddworld titles, and would be marketed more broadly than New 'n' Tasty!.

Lanning also stated that a voting poll was planned for the remake's name. Many fans liked the title Oddworld: Twice Ze Flavor; however, on March 14, 2016, Oddworld Inhabitants announced on social media with a press release that the remake would be entitled Oddworld: Soulstorm. Later at EGX 2016, a game developer from Fat Kraken Studios, Matt Glanville, said that Soulstorm would be a direct sequel to Oddworld: New 'n' Tasty rather than a remake of Abe's Exoddus, instead being a re-imagining of the game's story. Oddworld: Soulstorm has been described by Oddworld Inhabitants as "a complete story retake [of Oddworld: Abe's Exoddus] inspired by our original tale."

The press release stated that Soulstorm was in development and was slated to be released later in 2017. It was subsequently delayed to 2019, then into 2020. A team of 30 people was working on the game. Due to the critical and commercial success of New 'n' Tasty!, the game had a larger budget, leading Oddworld Inhabitants to co-develop with Canadian developer Frima Studio, and Fat Kraken Studios in England.

During the development of Oddworld: Soulstorm, Oddworld Inhabitants started an alternate reality game in which the developer hid clues within files and websites they created.

In September 2016 at the EGX Expo, Oddworld Inhabitants game designer Matt Glanville said that Oddworld: Soulstorm would be an expanded version of Abe's Exoddus, featuring some areas and game mechanics from Exoddus as well as entirely new areas. He said that some parts from Abe's Exoddus would look 'completely different to the original'. The Quarma system from Oddworld: Munch's Oddysee was also revealed to be in Soulstorm. In February 2019, there was a Q&A session with Lanning on the Oddworld Official Discord server. He said that Soulstorm sales would determine if a third game would be created. On May 13, 2019, Oddworld Inhabitants launched a gameplay teaser trailer for Soulstorm, with a planned release for early 2020.

At Gamescom 2019, Lanning announced that the game would come to consoles and Windows in 2020 or 2021, with the Windows version being an Epic Games Store exclusive release. He stated that the reasoning behind this is that as indie developers they had self-financed the game and required additional financial resources in order to deliver the high quality AAA game they set out to create. It was further showcased during Sony's PlayStation 5 event in June 2020, confirming that the game would be a console exclusive for both PlayStation 4 and PlayStation 5. Due to the COVID-19 pandemic, the game's production suffered yet another significant delay, with many of Oddworld Inhabitants' production team working from home. At The Game Awards 2020, a new trailer revealed a delay into Spring 2021, alongside opening pre-orders for the PC version.

Oddworld: Soulstorm was released for PlayStation 4, PlayStation 5, and Windows on April 6, 2021. On October 18, 2021, an enhanced edition was announced, which included improved gameplay mechanics, motion code, audio balance improvements, and polish. The enhanced edition was released for PC, PS4, PS5, Xbox One, and Xbox Series X/S on November 30. On April 20, 2022, a PC version for Steam was announced, and released on June 21. On July 18, 2022, a Nintendo Switch version was announced, subtitled Oddtimized Edition, and was released on November 18.

== Reception ==
Reception

Aggregate score
Aggregator	Score
Metacritic	PC: 73/100; PS5: 67/100; XSXS: 83/100; NS: 68/100

Review scores
Publication	Score
Destructoid	8.5/10
Game Informer	5/10
GameRevolution	7/10
GameSpot	6/10
IGN	7/10
Nintendo Life	5/10 stars
PC Gamer (US)	65/100
Push Square	4/10 stars
Shacknews	8/10
TouchArcade	3.5/5
Video Games Chronicle	3/5 stars
VideoGamer.com	6/10

Oddworld: Soulstorm received "mixed or average" reviews from critics, while the Xbox Series X/S version received "generally favorable" reviews, according to review aggregator website Metacritic.

Travis Northup of IGN considered it "an excellent remake of a delightfully weird '90s platformer with tons of charm, challenge... and annoying bugs". Chris Carter, writing for Destructoid, praised the levels for their openness and amount of content, as well as the variety in gameplay; he particularly commended the improvements to the series' mechanics, calling the movement system "one of the best parts of Soulstorm". However, he criticized aspects of menu navigation, writing it was "testy at times and requires a firm few (button) mashes to get going", as well as checkpoint placement and technical issues.

=== Sales ===
The PlayStation 5 version of Oddworld: Soulstorm launched on PlayStation Plus, which led to it being downloaded over 4 million times. Lorne Lanning thought that this was "devastating" for the sales of the game.
