= Lorne Lanning =

American game designer

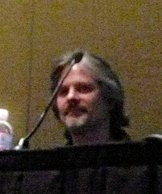
- Lanning in 2009
- Born: February 20, 1964
- Occupations: Game designer, writer, voice actor
- Known for: Oddworld
- Title: Board Director at Academy of Interactive Arts & Sciences.; Advisor to Academy of Art University President (San Francisco).; Advisor to the CGSociety Board.; Director on Advisory Board for Gnomon School of Visual Effects.

Lorne Lanning is an American game designer, director, writer and voice actor. He is also co-founder and president of the video game developer Oddworld Inhabitants. He is best known for creating the Oddworld series including the games Oddworld: Abe's Oddysee, Oddworld: Abe's Exoddus, Oddworld: Munch's Oddysee, Oddworld: Stranger's Wrath, Oddworld: New 'n' Tasty! and Oddworld: Soulstorm.

His creative vision in game design and property development at Oddworld Inhabitants had gained him worldwide recognition, including several documentaries and his character creations featured on the cover of Wired Magazine.

Lanning had said he has always had a fascination with video games, stating that his father was an engineer for Coleco.

== Career ==
Initially studying photo-realism and commercial illustration at the School of Visual Arts in New York City, Lanning soon attended the California Institute of the Arts in Valencia, California, where he graduated with a BFA in Character Animation.

Working as a Technical Director at TRW in Redondo Beach, California, Lanning later moved to Rhythm & Hues Studios in Hollywood, where he would later meet producer Sherry McKenna through his work. After McKenna joined Rhythm & Hues through Lanning, he later convinced her to co-found a video game development company with him.

=== Oddworld Inhabitants ===
In 1994, Lanning and McKenna co-founded Oddworld Inhabitants together in Los Osos, California, before later moving to San Luis Obispo, California. While at Oddworld Inhabitants, Lanning designed, scripted and voice acted all four of the studio's games, which earned the company widespread success and acclaim.

Following several disputes with game developers, including companies such as Electronic Arts, Lanning and McKenna shuttered Oddworld Inhabitants' game development studio in 2005 and relocated to the San Francisco Bay area, with the goal of shaping Oddworld Inhabitants after a traditional Hollywood production company.

After leaving game development, Lanning and McKenna began work on animated movies, starting with a project named "Citizen Siege", and a tie-in videogame series named "Wage Wars". Following difficulties in movie production, Lanning soon broke his hiatus from videogames when independent developer Just Add Water confirmed in 2010 it was working with Lanning and Oddworld Inhabitants to create a 2.5D remake of Oddworld: Abe's Oddysee which eventually was released under the name Oddworld: New 'n' Tasty.

In 2015, it was confirmed by JAW's CEO that the company will no longer be working on full-scale Oddworld projects. It was announced that in 2016 that Frima Studio is now the new developer supporting Oddworld in making new games. Their next game was announced at GDC 2016 with the title Oddworld: Soulstorm. In 2019, it was confirmed that Soulstorm will be coming in 2020 and it will be developed by wider development studios like Fat Kraken Studios and Sabotage Studio.

== Games ==
Year	Title	Role	Notes
1997	Oddworld: Abe's Oddysee	Creator, director, writer, voice actor	Published by GT Interactive
1998	Oddworld: Abe's Exoddus	Creator, director, writer, voice actor	Published by GT Interactive
2001	Oddworld: Munch's Oddysee	Creator, director, writer, designer, voice actor	Published by Microsoft Studios
2005	Oddworld: Stranger's Wrath	Creative Director, writer, designer, voice actor	Published by Electronic Arts
2011	Stranger's Wrath HD	As in original	Published by Oddworld Inhabitants
2012	Munch's Oddysee HD	As in original	Published by Oddworld Inhabitants
2014	Oddworld: New 'n' Tasty	Original Creator, writer, voice actor for Abe, Sligs and Glukkons.	Developed by Just Add Water, first indie Oddworld game released in Unity
2021	Oddworld: Soulstorm	Creator, director, writer, voice actor	Developed & published by Oddworld Inhabitants, second indie Oddworld game released in Unity

== Publications ==
Featured in the following books:

- "Reset: Changing the Way We Look at Video Games" by Rusel DeMaria / Berrett-Kohler
- "Opening the Xbox" by Scott Steinberg / iUniverse, Inc.
- "Gamers at Work" by Morgan Ramsey / Apress
- "Opening the Xbox" by Dean Takahashi / Prima
- "The Art of 3D Computer Animation" by Isaac V. Kerlow / Wiley
- "CGI: The Art of the 3D Computer Generated Image" by Peter Weishar / Abrams Inc.
- "High Score – Illustrated History of Video Games" by Rusel DeMaria, Johnny I. Wilson / Osborne
- "1000 Game Heroes" by David Choquet / Taschen
- "Inside Game Design" by Iain Simmons / Lawrence King Publishing
- "Williams Almanac Video Games" by J. F. Williams / IQ Guides
- "Game Design Workshop" by Tracy Fullerton, Christopher Swain, Steven Hoffman / CMPBooks
- "Exposé: Finest Digital Art in the Known Universe" Volumes 2,3,4,5,6,7" by Daniel Wade / Ballistic Publishing
- "Video Game Art" by Nic Kelman / Assouline Publishing

Lanning had written the foreword to the following books:

- "The Art of Massive Black" Ballistic Publishing
- "The Art of Oddworld Inhabitants" Ballistic Publishing
- "Quantumscapes: The Art of Stephan Martiniere" Design Studio Press
- "Derelict Planet : The Art of Pascal Blanche" (releases 2012)
- "Spectrum Fantastic Art Live (re: The Art of Andrew Jones)" Flesk Publications (releases 2012)
