= Oddworld: Abe's Oddysee =

1997 video game

- North American PlayStation box art
- Developers: Oddworld Inhabitants; Digital Dialect (PC); Saffire (Game Boy)
- Publisher: GT Interactive
- Director: Lorne Lanning
- Producer: Frank Simon
- Designers: Paul O'Connor; Jeff Brown
- Programmers: Christophe Chaverou; Eric Yiskis
- Artist: Gerilyn Wilhelm
- Composer: Ellen Meijers
- Series: Oddworld
- Platforms: PlayStation; MS-DOS; Windows; Game Boy
- Release: September 18, 1997: PlayStation; NA/PAL: September 18, 1997 PC; NA: November 11, 1997; EU: 1997 Game Boy; NA: December 4, 1998
- Genre: Cinematic platformer
- Modes: Single-player, multiplayer

Oddworld: Abe's Oddysee is a platform video game developed by Oddworld Inhabitants and published by GT Interactive. It was released in 1997 for the PlayStation game console, and computers running MS-DOS and Windows. A Game Boy version was released as Oddworld Adventures in 1998.

The game centers on the eponymous Abe, a meek Mudokon slave at the RuptureFarms meat processing factory. When he discovers that he and his fellow Mudokons are to be slaughtered to make a new product, Abe decides to escape and liberate as many enslaved Mudokons as he can. The player assumes the role of Abe as he attempts a perilous quest to emancipate his downtrodden people.

Oddworld: Abe's Oddysee was widely acclaimed for having innovative gameplay, good art direction and engaging cutscenes; however, its difficult learning curve and system of only saving at checkpoints received criticism. By December 2012, the game sold 3.5 million copies worldwide, thus making it one of the best-selling PlayStation video games of all time. It was the first game in the planned five-part Oddworld series, which includes the direct sequels Abe's Exoddus (1998), Munch's Oddysee (2001) and Stranger's Wrath (2005). A remake of the game, titled Oddworld: New 'n' Tasty!, was developed by Just Add Water and released in 2014.

== Gameplay ==
A gameplay screenshot showing Abe riding on the Elum for increased mobility

Abe's Oddysee is a two-dimensional platform game in which players take control of the character Abe to travel across separate screens solving puzzles, navigating obstacles, and avoiding enemies. Abe can die in a variety of ways, such as being attacked by an enemy, touching a hazardous obstacle, falling from too great a height or into a bottomless pit. If Abe dies, he will respawn at the last checkpoint. As well as jumping to navigate areas and crouching to roll under obstacles, Abe can break into a run to jump over large gaps or escape enemies, or tiptoe to avoid disturbing enemies, adding a stealth element to the game. As is common in cinematic platformers, Abe commits to his movement whenever he takes a step or jump, and the controls do not permit fine (or mid-air) adjustment. Abe can use throwable objects such as meat, rocks or grenades to bypass enemies or destroy obstacles, though grenades have a timer and will blast Abe into pieces if the throw button is held too long.

Abe has the ability to telepathically control Sligs, a type of enemy non-player character, but can only use this in safe areas; in most areas, flying orbs, known as chant suppressors, will stop Abe from using his telepathy by zapping him. Once Abe successfully possesses a Slig, he can control their movements to attack other enemies, use gamespeak that can only be used by Sligs, activate mechanisms too dangerous for Abe, and destroy the Slig when he no longer needs it. Abe's body is immobile and vulnerable while possessing another character, and if his host is killed, control will return to Abe.

Along the way, the player encounters other Mudokons that he can rescue. By holding down the GameSpeak button and pressing various commands, Abe can command them to follow him, stay put, and activate mechanisms, as well as praise or scold them. Sometimes Abe will have to go through certain procedures to persuade a certain Mudokon, such as responding to whistles. Mudokons can be rescued by safely leading them past traps and enemies to bird portals, which can be activated by chanting. If the player rescues at least 50 Mudokons (of the possible 99) during the course of the game, the Mudokons rescue Abe in the good ending of the game.

Throughout the game, Abe is attacked by Sligs, Slogs, Scrabs, Paramites, and Bats. Sligs will shoot on sight, but cannot see through dark areas; Slogs will bark loudly if they hear the player, and will chase them without regard for anything else. Scrabs will attack anything in their territory, including others of their own kind, while Paramites will attack when in packs or when cornered and are docile otherwise. Bats are enemies that occasionally appear, flying erratically in a small area, usually with other bats, and they can be killed with rocks. Elums are bipedal creatures that Abe can ride and communicate with by GameSpeak, although they will be distracted by dripping honey. Late in the game, Abe gains the ability to transform into a demigod called 'Shrykull', which can eviscerate all on-screen enemies. Abe can gain a limited number of transformation uses after rescuing enough Mudokons at the same time.

== Plot ==
=== Characters ===
Abe's Oddysee focuses on a variety of species that inhabit the game's setting of Oddworld: the Mudokons, a species with a rich history and culture who have been slowly transformed into meek, obedient slaves, leaving many who are born into captivity ignorant of this kind's past; the Glukkons, a species that covet power and money, lacking any morals or restraints on achieving these goals, and who have established large industries that have stripped Oddworld of its natural resources; and the Sligs, who have escaped enslavement by willingly serving as guards and hunters for the Glukkons. The game mostly focuses on Abe, a Mudokon slave employed as a floor waxer, who acts as both the narrator and the game's protagonist. Abe is described as a "klutz" and is portrayed with his mouth sewn shut, possibly to prevent his outcry. During his adventure, Abe is joined by Elum, a stubborn but loyal assistant. Abe and Elum were originally envisioned as beginning Abe's Oddysee together, living off the land until thrust into an industrial factory, but the developers determined that the story would be stronger should Abe come from a factory existence and gradually learn to become self-sufficient.

The primary antagonist of this game is Molluck the Glukkon, the ruthless CEO and gang boss of RuptureFarms, a massive meatpacking company and organized crime gang which is one of Oddworld's most profitable businesses. Molluck and his fellow Glukkons are often portrayed as wearing smart clothing or suits and smoking cigars. They rely heavily on the Sligs and a highly advanced security and surveillance system to control their Mudokon slaves.

=== Story ===
Molluck the Glukkon and his Slig observing the plummeting profits. The game makes extensive use of narrative cutscenes, as many staff members had backgrounds in 3D animation and film production.

While working late one night at RuptureFarms – a large-scale meat-processing plant on Oddworld – Mudokon slave Abe inadvertently overhears the plant's owner Molluck the Glukkon in conversation with his fellow Glukkons. Due to the decline in the population of animals that supply meat for the plant's products – one of which, the Meech, has now gone extinct – RuptureFarms is losing money and therefore at risk of going out of business. To return to profitability, Molluck proposes making a new product out of the Mudokons. Frightened at learning his species will be harvested for meat, Abe decides to escape from the plant, causing him to become a fugitive in the eyes of the Glukkons. Managing to overcome the Glukkons' security force of Sligs, Abe escapes the factory and reaches the region known as the Free-Fire Zone.

Upon looking to the sky, Abe sees a moon with its face in the shape of a Mudokon handprint, but becomes so focused on it that he notices too late the ledge of the cliff he is standing on crumbles from under him and he ends up smashing his head from the resulting fall down the cliff. A shaman of the Mudokons, whom Abe calls Big Face due to the mask he wears, helps him to recover while explaining that only he can save his enslaved brethren from RuptureFarms. In order to do this, Big Face states that Abe must undergo spiritual trials in the lands of the Paramites and the Scrabs, and traverse a set of labyrinthine, abandoned temples. Upon doing so, the shaman marks Abe's hands with a scar, each representing the two species, granting him the power of the Shrykull, an invincible demigod.

With this newfound ability, Abe returns to RuptureFarms, rescues his Mudokon brethren, and finds and deactivates the factory's main power generator. Molluck soon discovers this and decides to flood the entire factory with poisonous gas. Abe races to the boardroom to try to stop the gas, using his powers to destroy the Glukkon executives summoned there under the pretense of an emergency board meeting. After Abe deals with the gas, Molluck manages to capture him, and prepares to drop him into a meat grinder. If the player failed to rescue at least 50 Mudokons throughout the game, Abe succumbs to his fate; if the player manages to rescue at least 50 Mudokons, the freed slaves summon a magical lightning storm to destroy RuptureFarms, killing the Slig carrying out Abe's execution, and zapping Molluck unconscious, with BigFace rescuing Abe and bringing him home to a hero's welcome.

== Development ==
Oddworld: Abe's Oddysee began production in January 1995 under the working title of Soul Storm. After GT Interactive acquired publishing rights on September 12, 1996, the title was changed, first to Oddworld Inhabitants: Epic 1 Starring Abe and eventually to Oddworld: Abe's Oddysee. The game had a private showing at E3 '96, and journalists in attendance hailed it as one of the highlights of the show. A more large-scale unveiling took place at E3 '97. Though the original release date of May was pushed back to September, the version of the game shown at E3 '97 in June was remarkably similar to the release version, and Abe's Oddysee had a reportedly smooth development cycle with few late changes.

The first footage creator Lorne Lanning saw of Abe's Oddysee involved a pack of meeches chasing Abe. He said he was happy with the animation at the time but when development was nearing completion, the studio discovered that there was not enough disk space to include all of the species featured in the game. The meeches were removed from the final game and identified in the story as extinct. Another sequence under time and budget constraints concerned the moon that Abe witnesses after his escape from the Stockyards. Lanning explained that the CG sequence that occurs between Abe escaping RuptureFarms and entering the Stockyards was originally accompanied by footage of a meteor shower creating the shape of Abe's handprint, in order to imply "greater forces that are really behind it, that are trying to send him symbols". The budget for the game was $4 million, and GT Interactive dedicated $10 million to its marketing budget, the publisher's largest to date.

According to Lanning, the "GameSpeak" mechanic was partially inspired by the audio puzzles of Loom. Oddworld Inhabitants co-founder Sherry McKenna said it was part of her input into the game, given she had a background in both communications and psychology and believed that "the cure to everything is communication". McKenna also influenced the game's story with her solid beliefs against animal testing and for healthful living, making the characters' journeys engaging because "we want you to empathize with Abe. We want you to care for him", and in having the game reward peaceful behavior as much as destruction.

Abe's Oddysee was the first major GT title that the UK development team, that had been taken in by GT following the acquisition of Warner Interactive, became involved with. The testing process of the game was unusual for GT Interactive as the British team did gameplay testing whilst normally American games were only tested in Europe for language and other compatibility issues. The game's soundtrack was composed by Josh Gabriel, and its sound design by Ellen Meijers.

When Abe's Oddysee was in production, the developers found that an executive at publisher GT Interactive tried to sabotage production because he did not like the game being made. He took footage of the game to his boss, who loved the direction the game had, and chose to provide more funding at the expense of the executive who wanted to shut it down. Lanning later explained that in 1997 during Oddysee's production, the video game industry was seen as making toys, and not taken seriously; they were "happy to make a living, but they weren't necessarily going out and bragging about it". Games began to be more about shooting and violence and blood, but Oddworld Inhabitants was "the antithesis to that" and said "we can make people feel better rather than just feel like they won".

In the initial PlayStation version of the game, upon "perfect" completion of the game – completion with all 99 Mudokon slaves rescued – an extra full motion video (FMV) "Guardian Angel" can be viewed, which depicts a captured Abe harassed by "The Shrink": A mechanical creature with a sophisticated artificial intelligence. The FMV, which is absent from the PC version and later PlayStation releases of the game, introduced a new character to the Oddworld mythos. The character was reputedly part of an early advertising campaign, which included television commercials, but was eventually abandoned.

== Release ==
On the left is the original "Mudokon Pops!" packaging in the U.S. and EU versions, with the altered version to the right (as seen in Abe's Exoddus) that was seen in the Japanese version.

The game saw its first release on the PlayStation, MS-DOS, and Windows first appearing on store shelves on September 18, 1997, before fully releasing the next day (September 19) on a day dubbed as "Odd Friday" by the developer and publisher; over 500,000 units were originally released worldwide. The Japanese version followed in October.

For the release in Japan, the title of Abe's Oddysee was changed to Abe a GoGo by the publisher SoftBank. Other changes included the art for the "Mudokon Pops!" packaging, which originally consisted of a severed Mudokon head speared on a stick. Due to the Kobe child murders in Japan, the design was changed to a more ambiguous, "happier" image of a popsicle with stylized Mudokon eyes and two crosses similar in appearance to Abe's lip-stitches. The design for the protagonist Abe and other Mudokons was significantly altered. A Japanese pressure group called the Buraku Liberation League was offended by the Mudokons having four fingers and most of them working in a meat-packing factory, due to the burakumin, a historic Japanese subclass of meat packers, who were looked down upon in society. Four fingers, or showing four fingers to another person, came to insinuate the other was a member of the subclass, because it suggested the meat packers who lost fingers at work. Oddworld Inhabitants had to alter the design of Mudokons to three fingers, or else face legal battles and large fines. Also in the Japanese version, the game does not let the player choose to play Scrabania or Paramonia. Instead, the player is forced to play through Paramonia first.

Oddworld Inhabitants made the altered designs a permanent feature; subsequent versions of Abe's Oddysee released outside Japan included both the changed packaging and changed Mudokon hand. Future games and media (including New 'n' Tasty!) also recognize these changes as canon, although Abe's Exoddus features four-fingered Mudokon sprites, and scenes from Abe's Oddysee shown in the game were not altered.

A Sega Saturn version of the game was announced, but never released.

The Game Boy port was released as Oddworld Adventures; it was developed by Saffire and published by GT Interactive in 1998. The game is a significantly cut-down version of Abe's Oddysee, with only a few similar levels and a condensed plot (Abe starts out as a native Mudokon, so the opening levels in RuptureFarms are absent from this version).

An emulated version of the PlayStation version was released for the PlayStation 3 via PlayStation Network on October 22, 2009, in North America, on April 15, 2010, in Europe, and on November 13, 2013, in Japan. An Onlive version was also released in 2011. It was then later released as a PS5 emulation in 2022 in Asia, and then later parts of the world.

== Reception ==
Reception

Aggregate scores
Aggregator	Score
GameRankings	88% (PS); 79% (PC)
Metacritic	85/100 (PS)

Review scores
Publication	Score
Edge	8/10
Electronic Gaming Monthly	8.5/10 (PS)
Game Informer	9.25/10
GameSpot	8.4/10 (PS); 8.1/10 (PC)
IGN	7.5/10 (PS)
Next Generation	4/5 (PS)
PC Gamer (US)	88% (PC)
PC Zone	8.1/10 (PC)
PlayStation Power	81%

Upon its release in 1997, Oddworld: Abe's Oddysee received mostly positive reviews. Edge described the game as "a tight 2D platformer that's packed with great innovative touches and some great character design". GameSpot called it "the ideal platformer, balancing its action and puzzle elements perfectly to make the game intelligent, engaging, and, best yet, fun". Animation World Magazine applauded multiple aspects of the game, saying it "features some of the best graphics and animation we've ever seen" and commenting on the "sophisticated gameplay". GamePro gave it a perfect 5.0 out of 5 for graphics and sound and a 4.5 out of 5 for control and funfactor, asserting that it "bursts onto the scene with the kind of unique gameplay and killer graphics that will rocket it straight into the PlayStation hall of fame." PC Gamer said that "[the] charming and innovative Oddworld: Abe's Oddysee reminds us that any genre can be revived if you put enough care and creativity into it."

The graphics struck many reviewers as being excellent. PC Zone remarked that "the developers have created an outstanding visual environment for Abe to leap around in." However, the imaginative AI and visual designs of the assorted creatures drew more extensive praise. GameSpot found the AI "goes a long way towards making you feel as if you're interacting with an actual world and its inhabitants."

The game's difficulty, agreed upon to be extremely high, was its most controversial aspect. Some reviewers lauded the intelligent nature of the challenge and said the frequent checkpoints and unlimited lives keep the game from becoming too frustrating. Next Generation, for example, commented that "Action gamers are likely to be disappointed by the occasionally slow pace, but speed is traded for a considerably more cerebral set of challenges that require a great amount of persistence, observation, and thought." However, others found that flaws such as sensitive controls, slowdown, and trial-and-error level designs make the difficulty frequently annoying. Though GameSpot reported that the PlayStation and PC versions of the game are "virtually identical", most reviews for the PC version directed criticism at the lack of an ability to save at any point, since this was a standard feature in PC games. Edge said that "Oddworld demands a certain level of commitment to progress", while Science Fiction Weekly claimed the game's "innovative game play makes for a steep learning curve. This initial difficulty in figuring out how to play is aggravated by a save feature that often forces players to redo difficult sections." PC Zone stated that "progress does seem to rely on trial and error, which involves much replaying of levels and gnashing of teeth. All this can be frustrating at times, especially when Abe is plonked right back at the start of a level when he dies".

Abe's Oddysee proved to be a commercial hit: Lorne Lanning reported global sell-through in excess of one million units by late January 1998. He noted that Europe was a top market for the game, unexpectedly surpassing the United States. As of 2001, it has sold 2 million units.

=== Awards ===
The game won many awards, including the "E3 Showstopper 1997" from GamePro in August 1997 and the "Best Director" award at the World Animation Festival in 1997. At the Academy of Interactive Arts & Sciences' inaugural Interactive Achievement Awards, Oddworld received nominations for "Console Game of the Year", "Console Adventure Game of the Year", "Outstanding Achievement in Art/Graphics", and "Outstanding Achievement in Sound and Music". Electronic Gaming Monthly's 1998 Video Game Buyer's Guide awarded it Best Voice Acting of 1997, and their 1997 Editors' Choice Awards gave it "Best Sound" and a runner-up slot for "Best Graphics" (behind Final Fantasy VII).

== Sequels ==
Abe's Oddysee received two direct sequels. Oddworld: Abe's Exoddus was released for PlayStation in November 1998, taking place directly after Oddysee. The game continues the style of gameplay from the previous game with several improvements, such as the ability to use GameSpeak with different species and possess explosive clouds of wind. Oddworld: Munch's Oddysee was released for Xbox in 2001, bringing the gameplay into 3D environments as well as allowing players to play as another character, Munch.

=== Remake ===
A remake of Abe's Oddysee was developed by UK studio Just Add Water. The game was built using the Unity game engine and was released on July 22, 2014, on the PlayStation 4 on the PlayStation Network in North America, received a European release on July 23, 2014, and was subsequently released for the PC, Mac, Linux, Xbox One, PlayStation 3, PlayStation Vita and Wii U.
