= Oddworld Inhabitants =

American video game developer

- Type: Private
- Industry: Video games, films, television
- Founded: September 1994; 32 years ago in San Luis Obispo, California
- Founder: Lorne Lanning; Sherry McKenna
- Headquarters: Emeryville, California, United States
- Key people: Sherry McKenna (CEO); Lorne Lanning (president); Bennie Terry (executive producer)
- Products: Oddworld: Abe's Oddysee; Oddworld: Abe's Exoddus; Oddworld: Munch's Oddysee; Oddworld: Stranger's Wrath; Oddworld: Stranger's Wrath HD; Oddworld: Munch's Oddysee HD; Oddworld: New 'n' Tasty!; Oddworld: Soulstorm
- Website: www.oddworld.com

Oddworld Inhabitants Inc. is an American video game developer founded in 1994 by special-effects and computer-animation veterans Sherry McKenna and Lorne Lanning. The company is primarily known for the Oddworld series of video games about the fictional planet of Oddworld and its native creatures. The series debuted with Oddworld: Abe's Oddysee in 1997 and continued with Oddworld: Abe's Exoddus in 1998, but the studio has also developed standalone titles Oddworld: Munch's Oddysee in 2001 and Oddworld: Stranger's Wrath in 2005.

Oddworld Inhabitants took a break from game development for a time following the release of Stranger's Wrath. During this period, the company focused on other endeavors, such as film development. However, its main project, a movie called Citizen Siege, was never released.

The company returned to the video game industry with UK-based developer Just Add Water, resurrecting the Oddworld franchise with remasters of existing titles and developing new ones. A remaster of the studio's first game, developed by Just Add Water, called Oddworld: New 'n' Tasty! was released in 2014. It was followed up by Oddworld: Soulstorm, released on April 6, 2021.

== History ==
Founded in 1994, Oddworld Inhabitants came from a partnership between Lorne Lanning and Sherry McKenna. McKenna was initially not very receptive to the idea of making video games, believing them to be "ugly and confusing." Lanning returned to McKenna with three and a half million dollars that he borrowed based on his 3D expertise, and they moved from Hollywood to San Luis Obispo in September 1994, where Oddworld Inhabitants was started.

=== Video game development (1997–2005) ===
==== Oddworld: Abe's Oddysee (1997) ====
The first game from Oddworld Inhabitants, Inc. was 1997's Oddworld: Abe's Oddysee, a 2D side-scrolling platform game published by GT Interactive for PlayStation and PC. It proved to be a commercial and critical hit, sold 3.5 million units, made $180 million and won nearly 30 industry media awards. The game tells the story of Abe, one of 100 mudokon creatures enslaved by industrialist glukkon creatures in a meat-processing plant called RuptureFarms on the planet Oddworld. The company developed the A.L.I.V.E. (Aware Lifeforms in Virtual Entertainment) game engine for the title.

==== Oddworld: Abe's Exoddus (1998) ====
After the success of Oddysee, publisher GT Interactive pressured the company to make a sequel for the PlayStation by Christmas 1998. In order to make this happen, Oddworld Inhabitants broke from the second game of its original planned quintology, Oddworld: Munch's Oddysee, and focused on a new game. In order to complete the game in nine months, Abe's Exoddus was developed using the same engine, and added improved gameplay, a quicksave system, more cinematic sequences, and more intricate backgrounds.

Abe's Exoddus released in 1998 for PlayStation and PC, continuing the story where Oddysee left off using elements that were left out of its predecessor due to time constraints. Abe is sent on a quest by his deceased ancestors to destroy the mega factories that produce Soulstorm Brew—a product made from the bones of dead mudokons, and rescue 300 of his kind, discovering an even deeper connection to his spiritual past along the way.

==== Oddworld: Munch's Oddysee (2001) ====
The studio's third game was Oddworld: Munch's Oddysee, a 3D platform game developed with the upgraded A.L.I.V.E 2 engine and published by Microsoft Game Studios exclusively for the Xbox console. It was the studio's first 3D title. In the game, Abe returns to assist Munch, whose species has been fished to extinction by the Vykkers because their eggs are a delicacy marketed as "gabbiar" for the dominant species on the planet. Munch seeks to find the last known can of gabbiar eggs in order to revive his species.

On October 23, 2000, Microsoft secured exclusive rights to publish and distribute the next four Oddworld Inhabitants titles, beginning with Munch's Oddysee the following year. The development of Munch's Oddysee came after the decision by Oddworld Inhabitants to shift from the PC and PlayStation to Microsoft's Xbox console after development for the PS2 proved too difficult. The Xbox also had superior graphics capabilities that could withstand dozens of characters moving and interacting on screen at the same time with an evolving environmental landscape in the background.

Lanning later explained that the transition from 2D to 3D proved difficult for the team. The team working on Munch's Oddysee was the same team that produced Abe's Oddysee and Exoddus, and thus they had no experience in 3D game development. Three months from release, the team realised that development was not going to be completed in time, so new programmers were brought in and re-wrote the entire game.

==== Oddworld: Stranger's Wrath (2005) ====
For their fourth game, Oddworld Inhabitants developed Stranger's Wrath, a first-person shooter set in the Oddworld universe, but without the studio's mascot Abe. Previously titled, 'Oddworld Stranger: Wrath of the Wild,' the game features shifting perspectives between first-person and third-person. The player assumes the role of Stranger, the last of a seemingly extinct species called the Steef.

Stranger's Wrath was released in January 2005, published by Electronic Arts exclusively for Microsoft's Xbox console. Despite the game being well received by critics, it was not commercially successful, selling only 600,000 units. According to Lanning, EA games "sabotaged" Stranger's Wrath with its decision not to market the game.

=== Exit from video game industry (2005–2009) ===
The Stranger's Wrath marketing issues between Oddworld Inhabitants and EA Games left Lorne Lanning with a cynical view of the video game industry and how publishers treat development studios when they don't own the IP. EA made an offer to buy Oddworld Inhabitants, which Lanning and McKenna rejected.

After the release of Stranger's Wrath, Lanning initiated a case to audit the publishing deal his company maintained, with respect to royalties, and it was discovered that there were "millions and millions of dollars of error not in our favour," and chose to give EA an ultimatum of paying the money or giving back 100% of his company and all its associated IPs—EA chose the latter. However, ditching its publisher meant the loss of finances for game development, marketing, and distribution. Without being able to fund it themselves, Oddworld Inhabitants could not continue to produce games. At the time, the studio had begun work on a new game called The Brutal Ballad of Fangus Klot.

In April 2005, Lanning announced the studio's decision to cancel all projects and leave the video game industry. While Oddworld Inhabitants had started out creating video games, the company always intended to expand into other media, including film. Lanning and McKenna closed the company's internal game production in San Luis Obispo and began looking at business models beyond that of the standard publisher/developer model. The aim was to fund the development of IPs on a range of media wider than just video games.

An original painting made as part of an early visualisation of Citizen Siege

Oddworld Inhabitants worked on several projects during this time, including a CG feature film entitled Citizen Siege, an online video game tied into the film, called Wage Wars, and an HD machinima series. Citizen Siege was first announced by Lanning in October 2006 during his keynote speech at GameCity in Nottingham, UK. The film was to be directed by Lanning, executive produced by McKenna, and produced by Vanguard Films. It was described as a dark, political, action thriller with elements of sci-fi set in a universe separate from Oddworld. In the film, humans have been reduced to a mere commodity, where healthy human tissue is used as collateral against financial debt, allowing corporations to literally repossess people piece-by-piece. The hero of the story, now encased in a cheap life-support system, sets out to reclaim the pieces of his body and take down the organisation responsible for his own harvesting, crossing economic borders with the aid of unworldly powers fused to his mechanical body.

According to Lanning in a September 2007 interview, Wage Wars was expected to be an online game—the first of two to help promote Citizen Siege. The idea was to develop Wage Wars and Citizen Siege simultaneously "so that both the linear and interactive elements can launch together." When the studio decided to make the Citizen Siege film, it had a $40–60 million budget and were given the green light for an R-rated CG animated feature. However, the 2008 financial crisis made publishers even more risk-averse and it became even more difficult to get the project off the ground. Eventually, all the company's projects were put on hold.

During this time, Lanning also started a new venture, called Xmobb, along with McKenna, and Daniel Goldman (co-founder of the Total Entertainment Network) in Emeryville, California. Xmobb was described as offering social networking with video and gaming services. By August 2011, Lanning said the launch was a few months away, with patents filed under the business name Oddmobb, Inc., but at the Eurogamer Expo in September 2012, he revealed the failure of Xmobb. The associated websites have since been shut down.

=== Just Add Water partnership (2009–2015) ===
By 2008, Gabe Newell, co-founder of Valve, approached Lanning and McKenna to release Abe's Oddysee and Abe's Exoddus on Steam. In June 2009, they met with UK game developer Just Add Water at the 2009 Game Developers Conference.

Just Add Water's first release in partnership with Oddworld Inhabitants was the porting of 2005's Stranger's Wrath to Steam in 2010. Oddboxx, a collection of Abe's Oddysee, Abe's Exoddus, Munch's Oddysee and Stranger's Wrath was released for PC in December 2010. The North American release was delayed due to publishing issues.

This was followed by Oddworld: Stranger's Wrath HD, a high-definition remaster, released digitally in December 2011 for PlayStation 3. The PC port was released in September 2012 and the PS Vita version came out that December. An Xbox 360 version was planned but ultimately scrapped due communication issues with Microsoft. Mobile versions of the game were released in December 2014. The next release was Oddworld: Munch's Oddysee HD for PS3 in December 2012. It was later ported to PS Vita in February 2014.

The first new game to come from the partnership of Oddworld Inhabitants and Just Add Water was Oddworld: New 'n' Tasty!, which was a reimagining of Abe's Oddysee. The game was initially announced in January 2011, and was released on PlayStation 4 in July 2014. Releases for PC, Xbox One, PS3, Wii U, and PS Vita followed. The new game was made using Unity and featured 2.5D graphics.

In December 2015, Stewart Gilray revealed that Just Add Water would not be working on any new projects for Oddworld Inhabitants. No reason was given for their departure from the partnership.

=== Oddworld: Soulstorm development (2016-2021) ===
In March 2016, Oddworld Inhabitants' press release revealed it has in-house development teams in the UK and California, and have partnered with developers Frima Studio in Canada to work on a new title, Oddworld: Soulstorm, for a 2017 release. Though it was intended to be a remake of Abe's Exoddus, it was later billed as a reboot of the sequel. Lanning built on the original release to make the story darker and more developed, adding elements like crafting

It was originally expected to release in 2017, but was pushed to 2018 and then again to 2019. In 2019, the game was delayed for a 2020 release at the Game Developer Conference in San Francisco when a new trailer was shown showcasing a cinematic from Soulstorm. The game was finally released to PlayStation 5, PS4, PC in April 2021. An Enhanced Edition of the game, which added new content and gameplay, was released in November and brought the game to Xbox Series and Xbox One consoles.

== Games developed ==
Title	Year	Platforms	Developer	Publisher	Notes
Abe's Oddysee	1997	PlayStation, Windows (1997); PS3, PSP (2009), OnLive (2012)	Oddworld Inhabitants	GT Interactive	First Quintology game.
Abe's Exoddus	1998	PlayStation, Windows (1998); PS3, PSP (2009), OnLive (2012)	Oddworld Inhabitants	GT Interactive	Bonus game and a sequel to Abe's Oddysee.
Oddworld Adventures	1998	Game Boy	Saffire	GT Interactive	Handheld version of Abe's Oddysee.
Oddworld Adventures 2	2000	Game Boy Color	Saffire	GT Interactive	Handheld version of Abe's Exoddus.
Munch's Oddysee	2001	Xbox (2001); Game Boy Advance (2003), Windows (2010), OnLive (2011), iOS, Android (2015), Mac (2015), Apple TV (2017)	Oddworld Inhabitants (Xbox and OnLive ports), ART Co. (Game Boy port); Square One Games (Apple and Android ports)	Microsoft Game Studios,(Xbox and OnLive ports); THQ Inc. (Game Boy port); Oddworld Inhabitants (Apple and Android ports)	Second Quintology game.
Stranger's Wrath	2005	Xbox (2005) iOS, Android (2014), Mac (2015), Apple TV (2017)	Oddworld Electronic Arts (Xbox port), Square One Games (Apple and Android ports)	Electronic Arts, (Xbox port); Oddworld Inhabitants (Apple and Android ports)	First-person shooter/third-person platformer.
Stranger's Wrath HD	2010	Windows, PS3 (2011), PS Vita (2012), PS4, Xbox One (2022)	Just Add Water Ltd., Oddworld Inhabitants	Oddworld Inhabitants	High definition remaster.
Munch's Oddysee HD	2012	PS3 (2012), PS Vita (2014), Mac (2016)	Just Add Water Ltd.	Oddworld Inhabitants	High definition remaster.
New 'n' Tasty!	2014	PS4 (2014), PS3, Xbox One, Windows, OS X, Linux (2015), PS Vita, Wii U (2016), iOS, Android, Shield (2017),	Just Add Water Ltd.	Oddworld Inhabitants	New version of Abe's Oddysee.
Soulstorm	2021	Windows, PS4, PS5, Xbox One, Xbox Series X/S	Oddworld Inhabitants, Frima Studio, Fat Kraken Studios, Sabotage Studio	Oddworld Inhabitants	Retelling of Abe's Exoddus.

=== Unreleased games ===
==== The Brutal Ballad of Fangus Klot ====
The original artwork for Fangus Klot created by Oddworld Inhabitants.

Originally coming from discussions about a sequel to Stranger's Wrath, The Brutal Ballad of Fangus Klot is a standalone game, independent of the Oddworld Quintology, originally announced in an April 2005 issue of Game Informer. The story is set in the forested hills of Fangustan and follows Fangus, a shepherd who is forced to fight and become the savior of Oddworld when invaders arrive. Gameplay elements from other Oddworld games were expected to return. The game was to be released in 2006, with a Mature rating, and published by Majesco for the Xbox before it was canceled.

In a May 2011 FAQ, an Oddworld Inhabitants representative confirmed Fangus Klot will be in future plans following The Hand Of Odd and Oddworld: New 'n' Tasty! Stewart Gilray of Just Add Water has noted that there is a playable Xbox build of the game. Concept art was released in May 2013. In March 2014, Lanning revealed he has been designing the game himself for a year and a half and that if New 'n' Tasty! sells 500,000 units, Oddworld Inhabitants would finance Fangus.

==== Oddworld: Hand of Odd ====
Hand of Odd was conceived as an online, open world, real-time strategy game during the production of Munch's Oddysee. Early information revealed its multiplayer aspects and its ability to be played from the perspective of Oddworld's indigenous mudokons or the industrial Glukkons.

Ultimately, market conditions saw publishers lose faith in the RTS genre and Oddworld Inhabitants' own publisher was acquired by a risk-averse company, so the project was shelved. However, preproduction work on the game helped flesh out details of the Oddworld universe for future games. The game was thought to have been revived when Just Add Water announced plans for its development including launching a website with the original logo designed by Oddworld Inhabitants.

==== SligStorm ====
Oddworld Inhabitants briefly outlined an idea for a game that would have the player assume the role of an albino slig who is nearly killed by his brethren for being different. On May 9, 2011, an Oddworld Inhabitants released a list of FAQ answers in relation to future games, confirming Sligstorm will be worked on after "Abe HD" and "The Hand of Odd."

==== Oddworld: Squeek's Oddysee ====
The third game in the original Quintology following Abe's Oddysee and Munch's Oddysee. The basic concept of the game revolved around Squeek, who has been forced to live within a robotic life support device after his body parts have been repossessed. The title was mentioned by Lanning as early as 1997, prior to the release of Abe's Oddysee, and has been alluded to by Oddworld Inhabitants and Just Add Water over the years. In an FAQ on May 9, 2011, Oddworld Inhabitants confirmed Squeek's Oddysee would be worked on after Hand of Odd, Abe HD, The Brutal Ballad of Fangus Klot, and Sligstorm.

==== Oddworld: Munch's Exoddus ====
Expected to be a bonus game based on Munch's Oddysee outside of the original pentalogy, in the same way that Abe's Exoddus was to Abe's Oddysee, plans for Munch's Exoddus evolved to become Stranger's Wrath. It would have featured Munch traveling to a land named "Ma'Spa" to hatch the Gabbit eggs acquired from the original game. In 2013, Oddworld Inhabitants mentioned the game but confirmed it was not currently being worked on. It's generally believed that this game ultimately turned into Stranger's Wrath.

==== Oddworld: Slave Circus ====
Lorne Lanning revealed plans for a game entitled Oddworld: Slave Circus. It's believed that this was a reinterpretation of Wage Wars in the Oddworld universe.

==== Stranger's Wrath 2 ====
The first mention of a sequel to Stranger's Wrath came on January 17, 2013, when Oddworld Inhabitants posted on its blog asking readers to vote on the preferred next title to be developed by Just Add Water—Stranger 2 being one of the options. This game eventually became The Brutal Ballad of Fangus Klot.

==== Stranger Arena ====
A competitive multiplayer game in the Oddworld universe that utilised the mechanics established in Stranger's Wrath. Players would control multiple "Strangers" and battle head to head or in groups in multiplayer modes. It would also feature the ability to shift between third-person and first-person and include RTS aspects of defensive base building to combat players who focused on speed and accuracy. The game engine was initially built on the original Xbox system.

== Reception ==
Adventure Classic Gaming called Lanning "a legend in both the game and the film industries."

The Oddworld games have received more than 100 industry awards. Oddworld: Abe's Oddysee received more than 24 awards and three nominations from the Academy of Interactive Arts & Sciences over 1997 and 1998.

In 1998, Oddworld Inhabitants combined the FMV cutscenes from Exoddus and submitted them to the Academy of Motion Picture Arts and Sciences as Abe's Exoddus: The Movie for Oscar consideration in the Animated Short category. The short did not win the Oscar.

In 1998, footage from Abe's Oddysee and Abe's Exoddus was used in the music video for Get Freaky by German electro-dance music project Music Instructor. Footage from Munch's Oddysee along with new CG animations of Abe and Munch were used in the music video for a European song called 'Use Yur Imagination' in 2002.

In 2010, Game Informer included Oddworld on the list of ten gaming franchises that should be revived, specifically counting for the return of Abe.

Oddworld's mascot Abe was planned as DLC for the PlayStation 3's All-Stars Battle Royale, but was later cancelled.

Due to Stewart Gilray's crowdfunding support during the development of Thomas Was Alone, the creator named a game character after Abe from the Oddworld franchise.

== Merchandise ==
Lanning hinted at plans to release a game that involved action figures from the Oddworld universe in a pamphlet released at E3 in 1999. Called Oddwars, Lanning still has all the material he created for the game and may release it in the future.

On 30 July 2007, the composer of Stranger's Wrath, Michael Bross, released a soundtrack of music from the game.

Oddworld Inhabitants, in conjunction with book publisher Ballistic Publishing, released The Art of Oddworld Inhabitants: The First Ten Years 1994 – 2004 in 2008, an art book featuring design concepts, paintings and in-game screenshots made between 1994 and 2004 during the development of Abe's Oddysee, Abe's Exoddus and Munch's Oddysee. The book came in four editions: hard cover, soft cover, leather-bound edition (limited to 1000 copies, each individually numbered and with a certificate of authenticity) and folio edition (limited to 100 copies, each individually numbered and with a certificate of authenticity).

On 9 November 2011, to promote the release of Stranger's Wrath HD, a LittleBigPlanet 2 costume was made available for purchase. An XMB Dynamic Theme of Stranger's Wrath was also released a few weeks later, followed by a LittleBigPlanet 2 costume of Munch on 30 November.

On 9 September 2011, clothing company Insert Coin announced they would be selling t-shirts from their website with Stranger's Wrath images to promote the impending release of the remastered game. Two different designs were manufactured based on locales within the game. Jonny Eveson has also released designs for an Oddworld-themed T-shirt based on Abe's Exoddus. The design came in three colors. Oddworld Inhabitants uploaded the design to Qwertee seeking votes from the public to have the design accepted and put up for sale and on 1 April, the design was successfully added and put on sale for 48 hours.

In January 2016, Oddworld Inhabitants teamed up with publisher Limited Run Games for a one-off special release of New 'n' Tasty! on physical media if the publisher could reach 3000 followers on Twitter. On 18 January, Limited Run Games reached that goal and confirmed New 'n' Tasty! would be released on disc for the PlayStation Vita. On 29 March 2016, Limited Run Games revealed there would also be a limited edition physical version for the PS4. On 24 October 2016, Oddworld Inhabitants announced their second partnership with Limited Run Games to bring Stranger's Wrath HD to disc for the Vita platform only. The game was released on 9 December. On 9 February 2018, Oddworld Inhabitants announced their third partnership with Limited Run Games to release Munch's Oddysee HD on disc for the PS Vita. The game has been released on 23 February.
