= Oddworld Adventures 2 =

2000 video game

- Developer: Saffire
- Publisher: GT Interactive
- Series: Oddworld
- Platform: Game Boy Color
- Release: NA: 17 January 2000; UK: 23 June 2000
- Genre: Platform
- Mode: Single-player

Oddworld Adventures 2 is a Game Boy Color platform game developed by Saffire and published by GT Interactive in 2000. It is a spin-off off the Oddworld series based upon the title Oddworld: Abe's Exoddus, released in 1998.

== Gameplay ==
Screenshot

Described as an "action-puzzle platformer", Oddworld Adventures 2 features a similar plot to Abe's Exoddus in which the titular character Abe journeys to Necrum to stop Glukkons from desecrating the graves of the Mudokon race. The game requires the player to traverse through 24 levels, with basic platforming mechanics such as running, sneaking, jumping and climbing. The game also features a puzzle system in which the player is required to possess other creatures or issue instructions using commands to complete actions such as open doors or use switches. The command system, 'GameSpeak', allows Abe to command allies to follow him, wait, and 'work' to complete actions.

== Reception ==
Reception

Review scores
Publication	Score
AllGame	4/5
Computer and Video Games	3/5
Hyper	7/10
IGN	7/10
Nintendo Power	6.6/10
Game Boy Xtreme	55%

Reception of Oddworld Adventures 2 was lukewarm, with many reviews focusing upon the merits of the game's port to the Game Boy Color. Jason White of Allgame praised the developers for the faithful adaptation of Abe's Exoddus, stating "nothing was left out of this port", and expressed surprise that the game was "straightforward and easy to (play)" on a Game Boy Color. In contrast, Eliot Fish of Hyper stated the game "isn't terribly user-friendly", stating that the "controls feel a little inaccurate" and "the backgrounds are confusing to figure out...it's very hard to tell where you're meant to jump to".

The graphics of the game were a negative feature of the game for many critics. Craig Harris of IGN noted "the graphics suffer heavily on the translation from the vibrant, rendered look of the PlayStation to the portable, pixelated rendition on the Game Boy Color. Backgrounds are flat and lifeless (and) the lack of any perspective hurts some of the game." Similarly Computer and Video Games stated the visuals are "unfair and frustrating", as "many of the levels require a super human level of visual skills...trying not no squish little slugs which are only a few itty-bitty pixels high".
