= Oddworld: New 'n' Tasty! =

2014 video game

- Developer: Just Add Water
- Publisher: Oddworld Inhabitants
- Directors: Stewart Gilray; Lorne Lanning
- Designer: Matt Glanville
- Composer: Michael Bross
- Series: Oddworld
- Engine: Unity
- Platforms: PlayStation 4 Linux; Microsoft Windows; OS X Xbox One; PlayStation 3 PlayStation Vita; Wii U Android iOS; Nintendo Switch
- Release: PlayStation 4: NA: 22 July 2014; EU: 23 July 2014; Linux, Windows, OS X: WW: 25 February 2015; Xbox One: WW: 27 March 2015; PlayStation 3: NA: 21 April 2015; EU: 23 April 2015; PlayStation Vita: WW: 19 January 2016; Wii U: WW: 11 February 2016; Android, iOS: WW: 14 December 2017; Nintendo Switch: WW: 27 October 2020
- Genre: Cinematic platformer
- Mode: Single-player

Oddworld: New 'n' Tasty! is a 2014 cinematic platform video game developed by Just Add Water and published by Oddworld Inhabitants as a "ground-up remake" of Oddworld: Abe's Oddysee. The game was released in North America on 22 July 2014 and in Europe on 23 July 2014 for the PlayStation 4. The title was also released for Linux, Microsoft Windows, OS X, Xbox One, PlayStation 3, PlayStation Vita, and Wii U. It has been ported on iOS and Android and released worldwide on 14 December 2017. A Nintendo Switch version was released on 27 October 2020.

A sequel, Oddworld: Soulstorm, was released in April 2021.

== Gameplay ==
In Oddworld: New 'n' Tasty, the player controls a Mudokon named Abe. Similar to the original, the gameplay is a sidescrolling platformer with an emphasis on puzzle solving, with New 'n' Tasty reimagined in a 2.5D graphical style.

Abe has the ability to talk to and direct other Mudokons with an enhanced GameSpeak feature and the characters have more dialogue and responses when compared to the original game. The player's goal is to save all 299 Mudokon slaves (compared to 99 from the original game) at RuptureFarms which can be done by opening bird portals for them to escape through; several Mudokons are hidden in secret areas which often involve complex situations for the player to resolve. As with the original, the game has two endings depending on the number of Mudokons rescued by the game's finale; rescuing 150 or more throughout the story is required for the Good Ending, whereas rescuing fewer than 150 Mudokon slaves results in the Bad Ending.

Unlike the original game, there is a difficulty setting that changes gameplay elements such as Abe's health and enemy reaction times according to the difficulty level selected; "Hard", for instance, adjusts the game to replicate the original game's difficulty.

Abe has no direct way of attacking or defending himself and can be easily killed; thus, he must rely on his wits and resourcefulness to overcome enemies and dangerous obstacles. He has the ability to chant (for opening portals) and can use his telepathy to possess Sligs, who serve as RuptureFarms' security force; Sligs lack Abe's physical finesse (they cannot jump, for example) but carry firearms and can operate switches, temporarily changing gameplay. Other enemies cannot be possessed, and must be dealt with by solving the many puzzles in the game, which often involves setting up elaborate traps. Some enemies in the game must be outrun; in some levels Abe has a mount called Elum that helps in this. There are some areas in the game which require the player to memorize Abe's whistles, farts, and the verbal commands of Sligs to unlock electric fences and disable security devices, allowing Mudokons to pull levers and platforms.

The game has more random generators than in the original game, which can make it difficult to predict enemy movement patterns and behavior. Sligs have randomly generated AI and some flying mines also have random flight patterns.

To make use of the online functionality, the remake now comes with leaderboards. The makers observed players of the original game making speedrun videos and competing with other people, and have enabled players to check the leaderboards for the fastest completion of each mode, the best overall time (any%), and how many online PlayStation Network, Steam, Nintendo eShop and Xbox Live members completed the game 100%.

== Plot ==
Taking place on the titular Oddworld, much of the early and end-game takes place in RuptureFarms and its four "zulags", which comprise a meat processing plant. Other locations range from RuptureFarms' stockyards and free-fire zone, to the external mazes of the Monsaic Lines, Paramonia, and Scrabania. The two latter levels can be approached in either order and each feature a temple with multiple trials completed by lighting a flintlock and replicating the bell chime to unlock the exit door. Thereafter Abe must return to RuptureFarms to rescue the remaining Mudokons. The final level requires Abe rush to RuptureFarms' boardroom within a time limit to destroy the company owners and their robotic security system.

== Development ==
=== Announcement and development ===
In July 2010, Just Add Water announced that it was working on a new Oddworld title.

The first new material to come from the collaboration between Oddworld Inhabitants and Just Add Water is the re-imagined Oddworld: New 'n' Tasty! game. Work began later than planned as Just Add Water extended their development time for Stranger's Wrath HD on the PS3. First announced by Lorne Lanning, the game is based on Abe's Oddysee with a similar story and gameplay, with cutscenes rendered in realtime and is entirely built from the ground up using the original designs as a blueprint, but using none of the original's final assets to cut corners. The developers were given full access to the original's source code, as well as design concepts, maps and tools used in the entire production of the original game because Oddworld Inhabitants owned the rights to all of their own material. Lanning revealed the budget of New 'n' Tasty! was $5 million. The game was known during development as Abe HD and Abe's Oddysee HD.

=== Gameplay ===
In June 2012, Oddworld Inhabitants announced that the game will not be a remaster of the original PlayStation title, but a remake built from scratch with 2D gameplay and 3D graphics, using the original as a blueprint. The remake was described by series' creator Lorne Lanning as "basically Oddworld: Abe's Oddysee being redone in a 3D physics engine as a 2D side-scrolling platformer," stating the developers "are not trying to reinvent any wheels." Images tweeted by the developers and the first footage released at Eurogamer Expo on September 30, 2012, revealed the platformer will be presented in 2.5D (2D gameplay with 3D visuals) and has abandoned the original's flip screen aspect in favor of continuous scrolling, which dramatically changes the gameplay. In the original, the player could reset a screen's puzzle or AI, by returning to the previous screen and then re-entering the current one. Now, with realtime screen streaming, the developers needed to find a new way to reset enemy AI. However, Gilray has stated that they have discussed the idea of giving players the choice of playing the updated game with the original's style of flip screens.

While the PS4 and PC versions have all the visual bells and whistles, gameplay is the same across seventh-gen and eighth-gen platforms, and the developers hoped to run cutscenes in-game on all platforms that can handle it. The PS4 version runs in 1080p at 60 fps. When the Unity engine developers added support for 3DTV, Just Add Water planned to add 3DTV support to the game.

GameSpeak has been increased to include more variances of the same basic greetings and messages, though Abe begins with the original's basic GameSpeak and evolves his speech as the player progresses throughout the game, including speech from Abe's Exoddus. Gilray teased that they included character-based features. The Quicksave feature that appeared in Abe's Exoddus after frustrations from the original Abe's Oddysee has been confirmed. However, a checkpoint save system like the original returned, but the frequency has been increased so that the most any player would have to redo is a maximum length of three screens. Just Add Water intended to include the cross-save feature between PlayStation platforms. The development team also revealed the "co-op" mode returned due to its popularity in the original. It allows multiple players on separate controllers to take over gameplay when one player dies. Gilray estimates the game has an approximate play time of eight hours, which extends to approximately 15 hours when taking into account the two modes of gameplay included in the game. The game's secret areas and puzzles are in the same place as the original, but were altered slightly to suit the scrolling screen. Some secrets have been expanded, others re-designed with new environments, and some entirely new to the game. There are also puzzles based on music and timing. The developers have changed one thing from the beginning of the game that Gilray thinks results in a 'Fuck You' moment from the players but hopes they will enjoy. Abe's hand returned to the four fingers, as per the original design on the US release, before it was changed to three fingers for Japanese territories. And Mudokons in the Monsaic Lines are distinguished from those in RuptureFarms with hair to signify happiness. Alongside rocks, grenades and meat, SoulStorm Brew bottle caps, not seen until Abe's Exoddus, can be used in-game as throwable items.

=== Engine ===
In December 2012, the development team decided to cease production on their current engine and begin over again on the Unity engine, with Gilray stating it took three months to get to the stage they reached before the switch, and eight months to rebuild the entire game. Previous gameplay footage had been created in the original engine, Unigine. The change was made because the Unity engine comes pre-loaded with commands that otherwise would take extra time to develop, and because of the old engine, it would take 3–4 months just to make a game run on each platform, whereas on the Unity engine, it takes 2–4 weeks to make it run and make it run correctly. Gilray later revealed the cost of the engines was also a factor because Unity only costs them $5000 for licensing, whereas the previous engine was almost $100,000, and they would rather spend their limited budget on making the game, than powering it. On December 23, 2013, Gilray explained a delay in development was due to waiting for Unity to release the PS4 version of their engine, as the team didn't want to release a PS3 or Vita version without the PS4 version being ready.

=== Development team ===
Gilray stated the staff working on the game totals 14 and includes 4 environment artists, 2 character artists and animators, 4 programmers and 1 designer, who have made the game in 16 months that originally took 35 staff in 1997. J Mauricio Hoffmann is a cutscene developer, and Raymond Swanland and Jonny Eveson created art for the game. Mauricio Hoffman of Monkey Brain Studios, who began his design career as a junior technical director and then animator on Oddworld Inhabitants' own Munch's Oddysee in 2000, was handpicked by Lanning to be Cinematic Animator in charge of developing the game's cut scenes. Lanning has confirmed that rock stars and actors have submitted voices for various Mudokons in the game and have done so for free. Digital "box art" designed by Lorne Lanning, with original art by Alex Konstad and Johnny Eveson, and additions by Raymond Swanland, was released on February 4, 2014. A "famous musician" composed the title page theme and Michael Bross composed the rest of the game's music. Bross said he does not begin writing a piece of music without first listening to and understanding the original's, and is he always in consultation with Lanning and Just Add Water's Michael Taylor, who worked on the sound design and voice over editing.

In August 2012, Oddworld Inhabitants announced a competition where the public could submit a title for the remake that emphasized the game's introduction to the 2.5D/HD world. The winner was to be announced in a big reveal in September and to have their name immortalized in the game's credits. The pre-alpha version of the game was first shown at the Eurogamer Expo on September 30 and revealed the winning title to be Oddworld: New N' Tasty!, suggested by over 40 respondents, each promised a signed game poster and reference in the final credits.

=== Platforms ===
Platforms announced included PS3, PS Vita, PC and XBLA, with Oddworld Inhabitants explaining that Microsoft only imposed limitations on Just Add Water's previous releases because they were remakes, not new games like New 'n' Tasty!. Sony announced the PS4 as another of New 'n' Tasty!'s platforms for 2014 during the 2013 E3 Expo. After the completion of the final update to Stranger's Wrath HD, Just Add Water devoted all 22 of their staff to the production of New 'n' Tasty!. Just Add Water and Oddworld Inhabitants attended the 2013 Electronic Entertainment Expo to show off the most recent incarnation of New 'n' Tasty! and revealed the game will debut on the PS4, with the aim of releasing early on in the life of the console, but is not expecting to release the day the system is launched. It also released on the Wii U, OS X and Linux platforms in addition to the previously announced PS3, PS Vita and PC platforms. The first story trailer, rendered in the Unity game engine, was released on November 14, 2013, by Stewart Gilray on PlayStation's blog, who has since announced a release in Spring of 2014, with all PlayStation formats to be released a week apart from each other, and all other platforms to follow within 30 days. Gilray explained that the PC release was delayed because it was more susceptible to the production of illegal copies, which costs small companies like his a large chunk of the profits. By separating the releases, PC users were enticed to purchase the console version before potentially undertaking copyright infringement. However, they also revealed that while Microsoft has granted Oddworld Inhabitants a license to feature on their Xbox platform, the game is now unlikely to appear on the XBLA for Xbox 360 or Xbox One due to Microsoft's policy that game developers partner with a publisher before bringing games to their platform, and Oddworld Inhabitants' refusal to partner with publishers. Microsoft then changed their stance on self-publishing independent studios, with their ID@Xbox program, to which Just Add Water have applied, and "constructive conversations" are taking place. On June 10, 2014, Lanning revealed that talks with Microsoft had been positive and the game will be released before the end of 2014, after the Sony and Steam versions have been released.

In 2016, Oddworld launched New 'n' Tasty on mobile devices.

== Promotion, release and post-release ==
In June 2013, Oddworld Inhabitants attended E3 at the request of Sony and debuted a gameplay trailer. On November 13, 2013, they released a story teaser for the game to their YouTube channel showing off some of the old and new FMV sequences created. A gameplay trailer was released at the 2014 Game Developers Conference. A further trailer featuring clips from the game's FMV sequences and original song, Born To Love You, by Australian musician and self-confessed Oddworld fan, Elodie Adams, was released for the 2014 E3 Conference in June.

On January 26, 2014, Gilray stated the team had approximately 60 days until they entered the window for submitting the game for quality assurance testing. On February 21, 2014, Gilray stated the art was 99% complete and was on track for a Spring release. Lanning did not want to give a release date for the game until the developers were sure the game was finished and perfect, explaining "you’ll forgive us for not having a specific date, but you’re not going to forgive us for having a shitty game." The release date was announced prior to the 2014 E3 as July 22 in the US and Canada, and July 23, 2014, in the UK, Europe, Australia and New Zealand territories. Pre-orders for the US and Canada territories began on July 11, 2014.

A final launch trailer was released on June 20, 2014.

In January 2015, Oddworld announced that New 'n' Tasty! would be released on Steam on Windows, Mac and Linux platforms on February 25, followed by the PS3 and Xbox One launch in March.

In February 2015, the specification for the PC, Mac and Linux versions were revealed.

In January 2016, small publisher Limited Run Games announced a very limited, physical print run for New 'n' Tasty! on the PlayStation Vita limited to 2500 copies and later revealed a PlayStation 4 version limited to 5000 copies, that would see a simultaneous release on April 25.

=== Downloadable content ===
Lanning revealed plans for expansion packs to accompany New 'n' Tasty! On July 11, 2014, Oddworld Inhabitants announced the first downloadable content (DLC), a bonus level entitled, Alf's Escape, available shortly after New 'n' Tasty! releases in the US and Canada for all Sony platforms, and free with a pre-order of the main game. The DLC features Abe and his friend Alf – first seen in Abe's Exoddus – trying to escape an all-new area of Rupture Farms with new puzzles, specially recorded dialogue and its own PSN leaderboard. The game came free with any pre-order of New 'n' Tasty! in the US or Canada territories, along with an alternate factory cleaner "Scrub Abe" costume for Abe, unlocked the day New 'n' Tasty! is released, but available exclusively with pre-orders. In the SCEE territories, the Alf's Escape and Scrub Abe costume DLCs are available for two weeks after the day New 'n' Tasty! releases, but only permitted if the game is purchased with a PlayStation Plus account. The DLC level has yet to be announced or released for Nintendo Switch, though the costume was included as part of the base game.

== Reception ==
Reception

Aggregate score
Aggregator	Score
Metacritic	PS4: 84/100; PC: 87/100; XONE: 86/100; VITA: 83/100; WIIU: 81/100; NS: 78/100

Review scores
Publication	Score
Destructoid	8/10
Eurogamer	9/10
Game Informer	8/10
GameSpot	8/10
GameTrailers	8.5/10
IGN	8.5/10
TouchArcade	4.5/5
The Escapist	5/5
NowGamer	9/10

Oddworld: New 'n' Tasty! received positive reviews. Aggregating review website Metacritic gave the Xbox One version 86/100 based on 6 reviews, the PlayStation 4 version 84/100 based on 50 reviews, and the Microsoft Windows version 87/100 based on 12 reviews.

GameSpot's Daniel Hindes stated that the game is a remake that "was crafted with love and respect" and praised the puzzles, environments, new visuals, and the dynamic camera, but had issues with Abe's walking and running both being mapped to the left thumbstick, leading to occasionally imprecise platforming as he found himself running into traps when he meant to walk slightly. Hindes was also critical of in-game advertising, in which adverts for other video games appeared on in-game billboards: "For a game that is staunchly anti-capitalism, [...] it seems contradictory for those billboards to then scroll to reveal a poster for an upcoming PS4 game." However, Hindes did concede that these ads were rarely seen.

James Stephanie Sterling of The Escapist similarly applauded the game and its developer, writing that "It's hard not to be supremely impressed by what Just Add Water has done"; they enjoyed the entirety of the game, from the all-new aesthetics (which they said truly showcased the Unity Engine) and macabre sense of humor to "the brutal world [that] can require a lot of bloodsoaked trial and error". Sterling summarized their review stating, "Just as Abe's Oddysee was a classic of the PlayStation era, so too should Oddworld: New n' Tasty be a classic of the modern age. More than just a remake, this is a contemporary puzzle-platformer that charms, exasperates, and delights. This is how you do a reboot." Sterling's only criticism of the game was "the silliness of the corpse physics," noting that the ragdolls twitched and thrashed on the scenery almost consistently; conversely, Hindes appreciated the ragdoll physics, asserting that they "[push] the dichotomy between the dark subject matter and comedic attempts to survive even further than the original game."

Both Adam Barnes of NowGamer and Mikel Reparaz of IGN complimented Just Add Water on successfully modernizing the game, with the former saying that the way in which the underlying blueprint of the game was ultimately left untouched "[highlights] just how solid that core gameplay was all those years ago" and the latter saying that the "beautiful remake [...] irons out nearly all of the problems and limitations of 1997's Abe's Oddysee while bringing its best qualities to the fore." Nevertheless, Reparaz did also note that many of the new features – such as the Quicksave feature, the rebalanced checkpoints, a gentler difficulty curve, and new camera angles which "reveal threats in advance and offer more visual clues about secret areas" – essentially make New 'n' Tasty an easier game, even when played on the hardest difficulty.

Eurogamer's Christian Donlan also praised the game in his review, and attributed part of its success story-wise to the environmental and anti-consumerism themes (that Hindes also noted in his review) that are just as prescient in 2014 as they were in 1997, with Donlan observing, "New 'n' Tasty! is angry because it holds a cartoon mirror up to the injustices of the modern world [...] Injustice, it turns out, rarely goes out of fashion."

Chris Carter of Destructoid remarked that "New N' Tasty is basically a recreation of that same experience from 1997, for better and for worse." Continuing, he said that, "Developer Just Add Water has not only adapted the same great level design and aesthetic style, but the same wonky controls as the original." Specifically, Carter criticized the "imprecise" jumping and the puzzles that ranged from being "so obtuse that you'll be spending quite a while divining the singular solution, or so easy that the concept feels completely wasted", but concluded that "In the end, Abe's adventure is a tale worth telling."

The reason both New 'n' Tasty and the original game are so enthralling is because they actually have something to say. They're about empowerment, selflessness, and how those with more will eagerly take advantage of the underprivileged if there's money to be made. All of this is told without succumbing to self-righteousness, using abstraction and humor to make sense of the ideas.

— Ben Moore, New 'n' Tasty review, GameTrailers
