= Oddworld =

- Logo used for Oddworld: Stranger's Wrath
- Genres: Platform, action-adventure
- Developers: Oddworld Inhabitants; Digital Dialect; Saffire; Just Add Water; Frima Studio; Square One Games; Fat Kraken Studios; Sabotage Studios; Pocket Sized Hands; Streamline Studio
- Publishers: GT Interactive; Infogrames; EA Games
- Creators: Sherry McKenna, Lorne Lanning
- Platforms: PlayStation, MS-DOS, Windows, Game Boy, Game Boy Color, Xbox, Xbox One, Game Boy Advance, PlayStation 3, PlayStation 4, PlayStation 5, PlayStation Portable, PlayStation Vita, Wii U, Nintendo Switch, macOS, Linux, iOS, Android, Ouya
- First release: Oddworld: Abe's Oddysee; September 19, 1997; 28 years ago
- Latest release: Oddworld: Soulstorm – Odditimized Edition (Nintendo Switch); October 27, 2022; 3 years ago

Oddworld is a video game series and fictional universe, created by developers Oddworld Inhabitants under the direction of Lorne Lanning. The series has been released on various platforms such as PlayStation, Xbox, PlayStation 3, Game Boy, Windows, and Wii U, among others.

Throughout games set in the Oddworld universe, the player's character goes on a quest to defend Oddworld's ecosystem from endangerment by industrial corporations.

== Oddworld planet ==
Oddworld is the name of the planet on which all five Oddworld Inhabitants games are based, extant in another dimension. The planet was originally described as ten times the size of Earth; but Oddworld Inhabitants' president and creative developer Lorne Lanning has since explained that Oddworld's surface area is ten times the size of Earth's, given that Oddworld is predominantly a dry-land planet and Earth is predominantly water-covered. It has its own sun and thus its own orbit resulting in a unique clock and calendar.

At some point, the planet suffered huge natural turmoils that resulted in volcanic crusts forming a new layer upon the entire planet. When that crust collapsed, it created giant thousand-foot craters all over the planet. The planet has a total of three layers, each with its own climate, temperature and gravitational levels. The giant craters were then used by the various Oddworld species to house their cities, whose tips could be seen protruding above the crust surface when looking across the landscape.

Only one of Oddworld's continents has been featured in the games—Mudos—and only a tiny fraction of Mudos has been seen in-game. The journeys of Abe through Abe's Oddysee, Abe's Exoddus and Munch's Oddysee take him through that small portion, composed of fields, jungles, deserts, caverns and swamps. Much of the planet is decimated by industrialist species for their own profit; this is represented by city-sized factories and mass transit systems.

== Oddworld species ==
The protagonist species of the games in the Oddworld universe are the Mudokons (/muːˈdɒkən/): an oviparous anthropoid with blue or green skin. In Abe's Oddysee, Abe's Exoddus and Munch's Oddysee, the Mudokons are peaceful, spiritual inhabitants of a mock-Paleolithic society. Oddworld creator Lorne Lanning has explained that the Mudokons were not always sympathetic protagonists, insofar as, though they represent a class of slaves exploited by the upper class, their ability to telepathically control other species contradicts that status. Their principal enemies are the Glukkons, a cephalopod-like anthropoid with only vestigial lower limbs (usually concealed by clothing), representing an industrial master class. Subordinate to the Glukkons are the Sligs, who appear as soldiers or body-servants. The Mudokons have two sacred or totemic species, both of which resemble arthropods, but are actually vertebrates: the towering Scrabs and the arachnid-like Paramites, whereof both are hunted by the Sligs on the Glukkons' behalf to make food or similar products. Mudokons, Scrabs, Paramites and Glukkons were designed by Steven Olds.

In Munch's Oddysee several creatures were added to the game. The Vykkers are purple, hairless humanoids with four arms and four legs. Interns resemble Vykkers, but have only two sets of limbs. Big Bro Sligs are bigger and more powerful Sligs, with armored versions of them occasionally being seen. Fuzzles are small, furry, spheroidal predator-scavengers. Meeps resemble sheep, but with only one limb and one eye. Gabbits are an amphibian species whose single hind leg serves as both feet and flukes.

Stranger's Wrath introduced new species such as the Clakkers, who are anthropomorphic, flightless birds; the Outlaws, bulbous, hairless, blue-green humanoids; the Steef, feline-featured, gracile-legged centaurs; the Grubbs, amphibian-like bipeds that are symbionts of the Steef; the Oktigi, amphibious, parasitic cephalopods related to the Glukkons; and the Gloktigi, large, cephalopod-like bipeds related to the Oktigi and Glukkons.

Oddworld: Soulstorm introduced replacement creatures such as the Sleeches to replace the Fleeches from Exoddus and a big Slig known as the 'Slig Mama' which a Slig operates inside a protective casing and fires missiles towards Abe and yells common Slig phrases like "Halt!" and "Freeze!"

In the Oddworld games, the GameSpeak feature allows the player to interact with the non-playable characters (NPCs). Examples of GameSpeak commands in the original game Abe's Oddysee are "Hello", "Follow me" and "Wait". Rescuing Mudokons and opening certain doors are all achieved through GameSpeak. Enemies possessed by Abe can also use GameSpeak, and one can take control of Slig guards, use Glukkons to command subservient Sligs, or use Sligs to call their Slog pets to heel. GameSpeak also included burps and flatulence, for comical effect. The GameSpeak feature is modified in Stranger's Wrath, with a single talk button that causes the Stranger to say something appropriate to the situation. This context-sensitive GameSpeak also works for questioning the Clakker and Grubb townsfolk. This change makes the talk button more comparable to a universal-action button.

== Games set on Oddworld ==
The developers originally stated that the Oddworld series would be a pentalogy called the Oddworld Quintology, and that Abe's Exoddus and Stranger's Wrath were bonus titles not counting toward the total of five. The Oddworld Adventures games are handheld versions of Abe's Oddysee and Exoddus. The Quintology was halted after the first two games, when the company decided to redirect its efforts toward film production. There were also a few titles that were hinted at in interviews and press releases, but they were never developed.

=== Oddworld: Abe's Oddysee ===
At the beginning of this game, Abe is a happy, ignorant worker at RuptureFarms, a meat-packing plant, but he then discovers that the plant's boss Molluck the Glukkon has decided to use the factory's Mudokon slaves as a source of meat. At the end of the game's introductory sequence, which is a retrospective voice-over by Abe, he runs for his life. The Mudokons' spiritual leader, the BigFace, reveals that the Paramites and Scrabs slaughtered and processed by the Glukkons were formerly sacred to the Mudokons, and orders Abe to relight holy flames extinguished by the Glukkons. Having done this, Abe is empowered by BigFace and infiltrates RuptureFarms, where he frees the remaining slaves and destroys the Glukkon board of executives, but is himself captured. Should the player save a certain number of Mudokons, their free compatriots rescue Abe, and he receives a hero's welcome from the Mudokons he rescued. Should the player not save a sufficient number, Abe is executed by Molluck.

=== Oddworld: Abe's Exoddus ===
Abe's Oddysee was very popular, and the bonus game Oddworld: Abe's Exoddus was released the following year. Abe's Exoddus begins where Abe's Oddysee ends. Abe's abilities in this game were similar to his abilities in the first game, with an expanded ability to communicate with other characters in the world using GameSpeak. Here, Abe is informed by ghosts of his species that Necrum, a Mudokon burial ground, is being excavated by Glukkons, using blind Mudokons as slaves. Abe then departs, with his companions Alf, Ben, Phos, Han and Luke to find a cure to the sickness caused by the SoulStorm Brew, created from the excavated bones. Having cured his friends, he destroys the brewery. If the player is successful, Abe is again rescued by his friends; if not, he is captured by the brewery's owner and electrocuted.

=== Oddworld: Munch's Oddysee ===
Not long after the events of Abe's Exoddus, Abe helps Munch (the last living remnant of an amphibious race called the Gabbits) to save the Gabbits' eggs from destruction, in exchange for Munch's help in rescuing more captive Mudokons.

=== Oddworld: Stranger's Wrath ===
Oddworld: Stranger's Wrath is an action-adventure game published for the Xbox in 2005. The game's main character is a bounty hunter named Stranger. The game utilizes both third- and first-person perspectives and is less puzzle-oriented than the previous three Oddworld games. The game has a Wild West setting. It was later ported to the PC and released through the digital distribution service Steam.

=== Oddworld: New 'n' Tasty! ===
Oddworld: New 'n' Tasty! is a full remake of Oddworld: Abe's Oddysee developed by Just Add Water and published by Oddworld Inhabitants. It was released in July 2014 for the PlayStation 4 with later releases for additional platforms such as Microsoft Windows, Xbox One, Wii U, PlayStation 3 and PlayStation Vita. The game also had a physical version released for a limited time for PS4 and the PS Vita in 2016 from Limited Run Games. In 2019, LRG also released a physical version for the PS3. In August 2020, New 'n' Tasty was announced to be releasing on the Nintendo Switch in October 2020.

=== Oddworld: Soulstorm ===
Oddworld: Soulstorm is a direct sequel to Oddworld: New 'n' Tasty! and a reimagining of the story from Oddworld: Abe's Exoddus, rather than a direct remake. It was developed and published by Oddworld Inhabitants and released in April 2021 for Windows, PlayStation 4 and PlayStation 5. An 'Enhanced Edition' was later released in November 2021 alongside a port for Xbox One and Xbox Series X/S.

=== Released titles ===
Title	Year	Platforms	Developer	Publisher	Notes
Oddworld: Abe's Oddysee	1997	PlayStation, Microsoft Windows, PSN (2008), OnLive (2012)	Oddworld Inhabitants	GT Interactive	First pentalogy game
Oddworld: Abe's Exoddus	1998	PlayStation, Windows, PSN (2008), OnLive (2012)	Oddworld Inhabitants	GT Interactive	Bonus pentalogy game and a sequel to Abe's Oddysee
Oddworld Adventures	1998	Game Boy	Saffire	GT Interactive	Handheld version of Abe's Oddysee
Oddworld Adventures 2	2000	Game Boy Color	Saffire	Infogrames (Note: Released under the GT Interactive brand name)	Handheld version of Abe's Exoddus
Oddworld: Munch's Oddysee	2001	Xbox, Windows (2010), PS3 (2012), OnLive (2012), PS Vita (2014), Android (2015), Nintendo Switch (2020)	Oddworld Inhabitants, Just Add Water (port)	Infogrames; Oddworld Inhabitants	Second pentalogy game
Oddworld: Munch's Oddysee	2003	Game Boy Advance	Art Co., Ltd	THQ	Handheld version of Xbox game
Oddworld: Stranger's Wrath	2005	Xbox, Windows (2010), PS3 (2011), PS Vita (2012), OnLive (2012), iOS (2014), Android (2014), Ouya, OS X (2015) Nintendo Switch (2020)	Oddworld Inhabitants, Just Add Water Ltd. (port)	Electronic Arts	First-person shooter/third-person platformer
Oddworld: New 'n' Tasty!	2014	PS4 (2014), Windows & Linux (2015), Xbox One (2015), PS3 (2015), Wii U (2016), Nintendo Switch (2020), PS Vita (2016), Android, iOS (2017)	Just Add Water	Oddworld Inhabitants	A re-creation of Abe's Oddysee. Made on the Unity game engine. Nephilim Game Studios ported the Wii U and PS Vita version of New 'n' Tasty
Oddworld: Soulstorm	2021	PlayStation 4, PlayStation 5, Windows, Xbox One, Xbox Series X/S, Nintendo Switch	Oddworld Inhabitants	Oddworld Inhabitants	An expanded re-creation of Abe's Exoddus. Made on the Unity game engine

=== Unreleased titles ===
- Oddworld: The Hand of Odd. A real-time strategy game planned to be online. Although being halted when Citizen Siege was planned, it has since been revived as plans for its development have been announced. Said to be in production after Abe HD. It is said to be free-to-play with optional extras that may be purchased.
- SligStorm. It would have followed the story of an albino Slig who was born in a complex it must escape to avoid infanticide, and would have been included with Abe's Oddysee and Abe's Exoddus in a combined package. On 9 May 2011, an Oddworld Inhabitants representative released a list of FAQ answers in relation to future games, confirming Sligstorm will be worked on after Abe HD and The Hand of Odd. It is not clear where in the Oddworld continuity the game will fit.
- The Brutal Ballad of Fangus Klot. Originally intended to be the next game following Stranger's Wrath. Announced in April 2005, Fangus Klot was cancelled by Oddworld Inhabitants founders Lorne Lanning and Sherry McKenna over deal disagreements with publisher Majesco. In the 9 May 2011 FAQ, an Oddworld Inhabitants representative confirmed Fangus Klot is in future plans.
- Oddworld: Squeek's Oddysee. Expected third game in the original pentalogy following the first two entries Abe's Oddysee and Munch's Oddysee. In the 9 May 2011 FAQ, an Oddworld Inhabitants representative confirmed Squeek's Oddysee is on the cards after The Hand of Odd, Abe HD, The Brutal Ballad of Fangus Klot and Sligstorm are released.
- Oddworld: Munch's Exoddus. Expected to be a bonus game based on Munch's Oddysee outside of the original pentalogy, in the same way that Abe's Exoddus was to Abe's Oddysee. It would have featured Munch traveling to a land named Ma'Spa to hatch the Gabbit eggs acquired from the original game. It is unknown whether or not the game was cancelled or halted.
- Oddworld: Slave Circus. In an AMA on Reddit, Lorne Lanning discussed a possible future "gladiator"-type Oddworld title, in which the player could purchase and battle slaves. "I have been fixated on a game called "oddworld Slave Circus". It is seriously whack. You start the game by buying a slave. Think Gladiators on Oddworld. Have done a tremendous amount of work on this and have never mentioned it. But it is in the coffer and there may be some light for it down the road. But has some other contingencies depending on it. Requires new level of social integration into console gaming. It's insane. Hopefully not so insane it won't come to life."
- Oddworld: Stranger's Wrath 2. On 17 January 2013, on the Oddworld website, the Oddworld team asked which game fans would like to see after completion on "Abe's Oddysee New 'n' Tasty". Among the options was "Stranger's Wrath 2".
- Stranger Arena. A competitive multi-player game using gameplay mechanics from Stranger's Wrath.

=== OddBoxx ===
In 2009, the director of Oddworld, Lorne Lanning, announced that they planned to make an Oddworld digital download package for PC. This package contains Abe's Oddysee, Abe's Exoddus, Munch's Oddysee and Stranger's Wrath. Oddworld Inhabitants unveiled their re-designed website on 4 November 2010, also declaring that the Oddboxx was still in development. On 6 December, they announced that the Oddboxx would be released for the 2010 holiday season. The European and U.S. prices were revealed on 14 December. On 17 December, Oddworld Inhabitants announced the Oddboxx's release date as 20 December, with a 25% discount offer running until 9AM (PST) the following morning. On 20 December 2010, the Oddboxx was released on Steam. Achievements have been added to the two 3D games—Munch's Oddysee received 30, and Stranger's Wrath gained 20.

On 29 April 2011, JAW announced at GameCity Nights that the Oddboxx would be coming to the PlayStation Network (with other platforms to be announced). Stranger's Wrath HD was released on PlayStation 3 on 27 December 2011, and Munch's Oddysee HD in December 2012. Stranger's Wrath has 37 Trophies and Munch's Oddysee has 45 Trophies. Every Oddworld title is now available on the PSN, making the PS3 and Vita the only consoles to offer the entire Oddboxx other than the PC. Xbox 360 versions of these remakes have been cancelled.

== Characters ==
Abe is the strongly developed central character of the Oddworld series. He can also use GameSpeak, a way of communicating with other characters in the game. Along with Spyro the Dragon and Crash Bandicoot, Abe was one of the unofficial mascots of the PlayStation. Computer and Video Games described Abe as "a new platform hero" and a "brilliant character." Lorne Lanning, Oddworld's creator, has stated that its "characters are driven in a way that is fired by larger [moral] issues." The physical characteristics of the Glukkon species, principally its elongated head and gangly frame, were inspired by those of the villainous Teacher character from the film Pink Floyd – The Wall (1982).

Abe is the most strongly developed central character of the Oddworld series. He was inspired by the diamond miners of South Africa, who along with other indigenous peoples have suffered the ruthless harvesting of their land and people by industrial profiteers. He evolves and develops throughout the first game, Abe's Oddysee. He is initially a slave along with his fellow Mudokons, but escapes. The game's narrative and its main character deal with ethical and moral issues. Lorne Lanning, Oddworld's creator, has stated that its "characters are driven in a way that is fired by larger issues." Abe was the first protagonist that Oddworld Inhabitants developed. Lanning stated that Abe was named after Abraham of the Old Testament, because of the similarities between Abe trying to discover himself and for what he believes was the difficulty in trying to determine the true source of Abraham's discovery of monotheism.

Originally, the game's developers envisioned Abe and a mule-like creature called "Elum" beginning the game together, living off the land and being thrust into an industrialized factory slave environment. The developers came to the conclusion that the story was stronger should Abe come from a factory existence and later reveal one of self-sustenance, and as such the concept was eventually changed. In this game, Abe tells his story in flashback, which helps the player identify with him as the protagonist. Abe's abilities include chanting, which permits him to take over the mind of some of his enemies. He can also jump, climb, run, and sneak in shadows.

== Reception ==
The Oddworld games have received more than 100 industry awards. Oddworld: Abe's Oddysee received more than 24 awards and three nominations from the Academy of Interactive Arts & Sciences over 1997 and 1998. In 2010, Game Informer included it on the list of ten gaming franchises that should be revived, specifically counting for the return of Abe.

As of 18 March 2014, the digital releases of Abe's Oddysee and Abe's Exoddus have sold one million units. The digital releases of all games combined have sold two million units. The franchise as a whole has sold seven million copies.

== Other media ==
Oddworld is featured in the first episode of Icons, a documentary series aired on G4 that showcases significant milestones in video game history. In addition, various bumpers starring characters from Oddworld: Munch's Oddysee were aired on the G4 television network to announce commercial breaks.

Oddworld is referenced in the 2007 television series Code Monkeys. In the tenth episode of season one ("Third Reich's the Charm") Lorne Lanning appears as a fictionalized version of himself and pitches the idea of Oddworld to a fictional video game company, which results in him being tased and thrown out of a window.

Abe, Munch and Stranger appear in the LittleBigPlanet video game series as costumes for Sackboy.
