= Oddworld: Munch's Oddysee =

2001 video game

- North American Xbox box art
- Developers: Oddworld Inhabitants; Art Co., Ltd (GBA); Just Add Water (PC, PlayStation 3, PlayStation Vita)
- Publishers: Microsoft Game Studios (Xbox); THQ (GBA); Oddworld Inhabitants
- Director: Lorne Lanning
- Producers: Shane Keller; Brian Urquhart
- Designers: Jeffrey Martin Brown; Lorne Lanning
- Programmers: Charles Bloom; Erik Yiskis
- Artist: Farzad Varahramyan
- Writer: Chris Ulm
- Composers: Michael Bross; Tommy Tallarico (opening cinematic cutscene)
- Series: Oddworld
- Engine: NetImmerse
- Platforms: Xbox; Game Boy Advance; Microsoft Windows; PlayStation 3 PlayStation Vita iOS; Android; OS X Nintendo Switch
- Release: November 15, 2001: Xbox; NA: November 15, 2001; PAL: March 14, 2002 Game Boy Advance; NA: September 26, 2003; PAL: October 10, 2003 Microsoft Windows; WW: December 20, 2010 PlayStation 3; EU: December 19, 2012; NA: December 24, 2012 PlayStation Vita; NA: December 16, 2014; EU: December 17, 2014 iOS; WW: November 12, 2015 Android; WW: November 17, 2015 OS X; WW: January 26, 2016 Nintendo Switch; WW: May 14, 2020
- Genre: Platform
- Mode: Single-player

Oddworld: Munch's Oddysee is a 2001 platform video game developed by Oddworld Inhabitants and originally published by Microsoft Game Studios for the Xbox where it was released as a launch title. It is the third installment in the Oddworld series and the first to not be released initially on a PlayStation console.

Originally announced as a title in development for PlayStation 2, it was instead released exclusively as one of the launch titles for Xbox. While an "Oddboxx" containing the first four Oddworld games was originally intended for a holiday season 2009 release on Steam, the fourth game in the series was not released until December 20, 2010, on Steam, over two years after the first three.

The game received generally positive critical reviews around the time of its release, though retrospective and reviews of the game's ports have been more mixed to negative.

== Gameplay ==
Abe and Munch fighting alongside their fellow Mudokon friends

Munch's Oddysee was the first game in the Oddworld series in 3D, unlike the 2D Abe's Oddysee and Abe's Exoddus.

Abe's chant possession ability (enabling the player to control NPCs) was also changed: in Munch's Oddysee, it appears as a small ball of energy which the player controls, and must be earned by the collection of the spherical "spooceshrubs", which may also be used for opening some locked doors. Other new features include Abe's ability to pick up objects and people, and different vending machines, which supply new abilities for a brief moment. The most significant new feature is the ability to switch control between Abe and Munch. Munch has his own abilities, such as using his sonar to control the Snoozers from the control panel, as well as pick up grabbers. He can also swim in water, while Abe can not. In the game's booklet, it warns that Abe can only possess Industrialists, but in gameplay, the player can possess all the creatures permitted in Oddworld: Abe's Exoddus, and, for the first time, Slogs (the reptilian hounds kept by the industrialists as guards), though the options for controlling non-Industrialists are very limited, and usually result in the victim's destruction.

== Synopsis ==
=== Characters ===
Munch's Oddysee features a selection of new species: the Vykkers, who act as researchers and conduct immoral experiments on other species; the Gabbits, a frog-like species that has been nearly driven to extinction thanks to Glukkons harvesting them; and the Fuzzles, a puffball-like species that the Vykkers frequently experiment on, causing them to be highly aggressive. The game's main protagonist and narrator is Munch, a Gabbit who is captured at the beginning, but subsequently breaks free thanks to a device that grants him new powers. While his story focuses on him rescuing Fuzzles and the last eggs of his species, the game is also joined by the Mudokon hero Abe, who assists in this task in order to find the eggs of unborn Mudokon being held by the Glukkons. The main antagonists of the game include the Vykkers researcher Humphrey, his colleague Irwin, and the Glukkon queen Lady Margaret, both of whom seek to stop the duo while achieving their own goals.

=== Plot ===
Following the destruction of RuptureFarms and SoulStorm Brewery, (Note: As depicted in Abe's Oddysee and Abe's Exoddus.) the Glukkons commercially harvest the froglike Gabbits nearly to extinction, harvesting them for their eggs, to create a caviar-based delicacy called "Gabbiar", and their lungs, needed to replace their own because of their excessive chain-smoking habit. Munch, the last surviving Gabbit, is captured and brought to Vykkers Labs, a floating research fortress, where the Vykkers prepare to convert him into a slave to find animals for them, to allow them more time for their research. After having an electronic device attached to his head for that purpose, Munch finds he can use it to help break free captured Fuzzles, who help him to break free from his own confinement. At the same time, the Mudokon hero Abe is instructed by the "Almighty Raisin", an ancient oracular creature, to find and rescue Munch upon learning of his predicament. Abe reaches the Lab, just as Munch manages to escape via a waste chute, and work together to return to the Raisin.

Upon returning to see him, the Raisin reveals that both need to work together to get back into Vykkers Labs, where Abe can find the eggs of unborn Mudokons that he needs to save. Although not willing to return, Munch learns that the only way to save his species from extinction is to recover the last can of Gabbiar in existence, which is due to be auctioned in the Labs. The duo discover that the only way to infiltrate the Labs and the auction is to assist a lazy Glukkon named Lulu, who desires to achieve a fortune from other Glukkons and elevate himself to the highest social rank amongst his species. To assist in this, the duo track down and force various wealthy Glukkons to donate their money to Lulu's accounts, swiftly making him a multi-millionaire. Lulu then heads to Vykkers Labs to bask in his new-found fame and wealth, to which Abe and Munch use the opportunity to break into the Labs. What happens next depends on the overall level of Quarma the player has attained by this point.

If the player fails to rescue enough Fuzzles and Mudokon scrubs, attaining less than 50% Quarma, the duo find themselves ambushed by the Fuzzles, who turn on them for not rescuing their kind from the Vykkers. As a result, Abe is killed and has his head displayed as a trophy, while Munch is killed by the Vykkers while extracting his lungs for the Glukkon queen, Lady Margaret. If the player achieves the level of "Black Quarma" (10% Quarma), it's revealed additionally that the Gabbiar has been eaten and the Mudokon eggs have hatched into a new labor force.

If the player has saved a reasonable number of Fuzzles and Mudokons scrubs, attaining 50% Quarma or more, the duo begin working to rescue the eggs of the Mudokons before the auction is to take place, sending them to a transport commandeered by Abe's fellow Mudokons. Eventually, the duo manipulate Lulu to attend the auction and take part in it, with Abe managing to maintain control on him long enough to win the auction. In the resulting chaos, the duo rescue the can of Gabbiar and escape from the Labs. On the ship, As the duo leave across the skies, Abe and Munch watch as Vykkers Labs is destroyed by explosives planted within by the Fuzzles, and witness a second moon in the sky bearing the footprint of the Gabbits on its face. If the player achieves the rank of "Angelic Quarma" (90% Quarma), it is revealed that in the aftermath of the destruction of Vykkers Labs, and the liberation of the Mudokon scrubs, Fuzzles and Mudokon eggs, the industrial economy is thrown into disarray with stock prices falling exponentially, and Lulu – who has been reduced to begging following his bankruptcy from winning the auction – is blamed for it.

== Development ==
Munch's Odysee was Oddworld Inhabitants' first foray into 3D computer graphics. The studio began developing the game for the PlayStation 2, but had two problems—the "unfriendly development environment of the hardware" made it difficult to program for, and the quality of animation was not as good as director Lorne Lanning wanted it, relative to how much they were spending. The studio decided to switch development to Microsoft's in-development Xbox console, as Lanning was attracted by the superior graphics capabilities required to produce the animation and withstand multiple dozen characters moving and interacting on screen at the same time in the quality of animation they wanted, and with an evolving environmental landscape in the background. On October 23, 2000, Microsoft announced the signing of a deal with Infogrames, securing exclusive rights to publishing and distributing the next four Oddworld Inhabitants titles, beginning with Munch's Oddysee the following year. This was initiated by Lanning's disappointment with Infogrames' cut in budget to about $3 million per game after their acquisition of series publisher GT Interactive, while Microsoft wanted a family friendly launch title to increase their player base, giving such high priority to the game to the point they consulted with Lanning on the console's specifications. The only compromise in the publishing deal is that the game must be exclusive to Xbox on consoles. Lanning expressed his regret at leaving the PC platform, but Microsoft refused to agree to a PC version of the game, and "unless you're going to pay for [games] yourself... you have to work with partners" who place constraints on products.

The conceptualization for Munch came from hundreds of design concepts based on combining imagery of cats in UCLA medical labs and facial cream testing divisions with images of rabbits used in pharmaceutical testing and the "pure evil" of U.S. radiation experiments on unwitting elderly citizens seeking medical assistance. The theme of species extinction came from Lanning's experiences as a child growing up, fishing on the Connecticut river and watching species of fish literally die out due to acid rain and factories built nearby. He wanted Munch to embody loneliness and loss to hit the heart strings of the audience, and as with Abe, he begins the game at the "conceptual position of biggest loser, the most downtrodden, hopeless possible position" because "the Oddworld series is all about big, corporate bullies picking on the little guy," and Lanning wanted "every hero we built on Oddworld [to] come out of that soil," so his story was again couched in "the dark side of globalisation" that would be the basis of all Oddworld stories:

so, I knew for Abe I wanted the food crisis and the plight of the third world completely exploited labour to be centre stage. But I also knew that in this universe [...] I wanted to be able to say that later on we're going to take a flight, say this far away, and we'll land somewhere else and then we'll focus on the animal testing victim, the ultra-last guy you would like to be, the lab-rat, who has nothing going on you know, so that was Munch's Oddysee."

— Lorne Lanning, Katzenjammer Records

According to Lanning, Munch was the embodiment of the "disturbing, sad reality that's happening in our world today [turned] into a character that people like" in the dysfunctional 21st century. Where Disney "won the 20th century, that's not the future, because kids just don't dig that anymore, we're dealing with different kids... it's a dysfunctional world... if we can embody dysfunctional characters that are really endearing, then we think that's what people are really going to connect with."

Lanning regretted the development of Munch's Oddysee, taking responsibility for being overly demanding on the developers and ambitious in game design. Lanning later explained in 2006 that video game developers were being held back creatively by the race to develop newer technologies, a fact that affected the production of Munch's Oddysee because of the change from 2D to 3D that was demanded by the market of the new Xbox. The team working on Munch's Oddysee was the same team that produced Abe's Oddysee and Exoddus, and thus they had no experience in 3D game development. In the case of the 2D Abe games, the backgrounds were paintings processed into sprites, pre-rendered and photo retouched, allowing them to add much more detail that was not possible in the 3D environment of Munch's Oddysee. Three months from release, the team realised that development was not going to be complete in time, so "four or five" new programmers were brought in and replaced most of the development team, who re-wrote the entire game in nine months. As for the increase in humor and its "cartoony" style, Lanning explained that Microsoft thought of the Oddworld franchise as its Super Mario Bros.

Gilray revealed the failure of Munch's Oddysee left the team heartbroken. Lanning felt that they, and in particular he, under-delivered on the promise of this new game, and for the first time since before Abe's Oddysee, he felt a sense of vulnerability in the industry. The game's commercial failure was further worsened by the release of Bungie's Halo: Combat Evolved on the same day.

In October 2017, Lanning revealed that he was approached by a film producer with ties to J. J. Abrams during the production of Munch's Oddysee. He admits he never read the treatment that they made, and blames the missed opportunity on the demanding nature of the video game industry at the time.

The game was in development for more than three years with a budget in the neighborhood of $10 million.

== Release ==
=== Game Boy Advance version ===
Oddworld: Munch's Oddysee was ported to the Game Boy Advance in 2003. It was developed by Art Co., Ltd and published by THQ. It is a top-down 2D platformer and the third and currently last Oddworld game made for a handheld console. This port is more family-friendly, with no gore and profanity. The story was also changed to be much simpler compared to its console counterpart.

=== PS3 port ===
An upgraded port of Munch's Oddysee was announced in April 2011 for release on PlayStation 3, developed by the team at Just Add Water. It was released on the PlayStation Network and include enhanced 720p visuals, more detailed character models, remastered dialogue, and bonus material. Just Add Water later confirmed that both Munch's Oddysee and Stranger's Wrath would be released on the PlayStation Vita. On November 30, 2011, a LittleBigPlanet 2 costume of Munch was released on the PlayStation Store. The game was released on December 19, 2012, in Europe, and on December 24 in North America.

=== Other ports ===
On February 25, 2016, Oddworld Inhabitants announced a public beta for a re-working port for the PC version of Oddworld: Munch's Oddysee. The port made by Square One was released on macOS, iOS, tvOS and Android. There is also a Steam version for Microsoft Windows. The new port fixed all the bugs that the original version had. A port for the Nintendo Switch was released on May 14, 2020.

== Reception ==
Reception

Aggregate scores
Aggregator	Score
GameRankings	XBOX: 79% GBA: 49%
Metacritic	XBOX: 80/100; GBA: 44/100; VITA: 72/100; NS: 59/100

Review scores
Publication	Score
Next Generation	4/5
TouchArcade	4/5

Oddworld: Munch's Oddysee received positive reviews from critics upon its release in 2001. More critical of the title, GameSpot gave the game a 7.9, stating that it is "a very smart game with great puzzles, yet there's not enough variety in those puzzles to keep it completely entertaining throughout." IGN gave the game a 7.4, saying "The final product comes off as anything but polished, and suffers from a lack of variety, and an overabundance of repetition that keeps this game from truly shining like I wished it would. As much as I like the characters and the design of the new Munch game, I'm still hoping for the true spiritual sequel to my good old Abe."

Next Generation reviewed the Xbox version of the game, rating it four stars out of five, and stated that "Munch isn't a typical platformer, but it's still completely entertaining, unique, and highly recommended."

The Academy of Interactive Arts & Sciences awarded Munch's Oddysee for "Outstanding Achievement in Animation" during the 5th Annual Interactive Achievement Awards; it was also nominated for "Innovation in Console Gaming" and "Outstanding Achievement in Art Direction", but these went to Pikmin and Ico, respectively.

- Nominee, Readers' Choice – Best Xbox Story of 2001 Xbox IGN, 2002
- Nominee, Readers' Choice – Best Xbox Graphics of 2001 Xbox IGN, 2002
- Nominee, Readers' Choice – Best Xbox Sound of 2001 Xbox IGN, 2002
- No. 1, Best Characters – PLAY, 2002
- Xbox Elite Award for Excellence – Official Xbox Magazine, 2002
- Best in Show Xbox Games, E3 2001 – Edge, 2002
- Best Xbox Game – E3 2002 Review Electronic Gaming Monthly, 2002

=== Retrospective and port reviews ===
Retrospectives and reviews of ports of the game have been more mixed to negative, with some critics considering it to be the worst game in the Oddworld series. In a 2020 review of the Nintendo Switch version, Nintendo Life remarked that the game was the worst in the Oddworld series and criticized the level design, control, and the unpolished feeling of the game. The Switch port was also criticized for not updating the game's control options and for keeping bugs that were present in the Xbox version in the game.

The Switch and Vita ports of the game that were released in 2020 and 2014 have Metacritic scores of 58 and 72 respectively, indicating "mixed or average" reviews.
