= Sackboy =

Fictional video game character

- LittleBigPlanet character
- Sackboy as he appears in Sackboy: A Big Adventure (2020)
- First appearance: LittleBigPlanet (2008)
- Last appearance: Ultimate Sackboy (2023)
- Created by: Media Molecule
- Voiced by: Kenneth Young

In-universe information
- Gender: Non-binary (he/him pronouns)

Sackboy is a fictional character and main protagonist of the LittleBigPlanet video game series published by Sony Interactive Entertainment. Introduced in the 2008 video game LittleBigPlanet, Sackboy is a small, anthropomorphic, humanoid doll-like amigurumi character made of burlap sack with a brown knit pattern by default, with a zip fastener and button eyes. Sackboy was originally designed to be a "blank canvas" for LittleBigPlanet players, and is fully customisable using costumes which are either in-game unlockable content, or purchased as downloadable content from the PlayStation Store. Sackboy was jointly created by the founding members of British game studio Media Molecule. Scottish composer Kenneth Young provided the vocal effects for the character from 2008 to 2014.

Due to the commercial and critical success of the LittleBigPlanet franchise, Sackboy is considered to be a mascot character for Sony's PlayStation brand by Sony staff members as well as video game journalists, and has drawn comparisons to several other video game mascot characters. The character's appearance in the 2020 spin-off title Sackboy: A Big Adventure, the first 3D platforming game in the series which also features Sackboy as a distinct character, has garnered a positive reaction.

== Characteristics ==
Sackboy is the playable character of the LittleBigPlanet series of video games, which encourage players to create their own custom levels using in-game toolsets and share it online for other players to download and play. Sackboy was not intended to have a defined personality, as he was envisioned to be a blank canvas on which to express the player's own personal style, thus Sackboy is a silent protagonist, unlike other characters in the series. His vocal effects from the inception of the franchise to 2014's LittleBigPlanet 3 were provided by Scottish composer Kenneth Young.

"See, in our minds, the adorable player characters in Media Molecules LittleBigPlanet are anything you want them to be, yet immediately recognizable all the same. Whether boy or girl, plain or costumed, the shape and peppy movements of the Sack people are unmistakable. Plus, the plethora of customization options means anyone can tailor their own fabric-and-zipper friend, though the default model is charming all on his own. And any PlayStation character can make the Sack transition. M-rated fare of all shapes and sizes—Kratos, Ezio Auditore, Solid Snake, Nathan Drake—instantly look adorable once Sackified."

— Lucas White, GamesRadar

Sackboy can use his limbs to run, jump, and grab certain materials and operate levers. Players can also animate Sackboy to perform a dance routine, or use machinima techniques to create a cinematic production with Sackboy. In the main series LittleBigPlanet, Sackboy is represented by four emotional states: happiness, sadness, worry and anger, each of which comes in three levels of intensity and can be controlled by players. Depending on the input motion by the player operating the PlayStation controller, Sackboy will hold his hands differently. To express happiness, Sackboy makes a peace symbol with his hands. To express sadness, Sackboy holds his thumbs down. To express anger, Sackboy makes a fist out of his hands, and to express fear, Sackboy holds up his hands and they shake.

The Pod is Sackboy's "home", which is customisable through the use of stickers and decorations, and appears to be located within a bedroom and suspended by strings. The Pod is where the player can find and join levels, meet up with friends, and launch the level editor. To navigate the various levels, Sackboy operates a giant-sized PlayStation 3 controller within the Pod to travel to various levels. There are also three forward-and-back layers Sackboy can move between to navigate different areas of the levels, and sixteen forward-and-back layers in LittleBigPlanet 3. It is possible for players to customise Sackboy to look like anything the player desires, including other recognizable characters in popular culture, using nothing more than random objects or creating detailed stickers to paint him with. Some of Sackboy's licensed costumes are inspired by other video game series, including Assassin's Creed, God of War, Uncharted, Metal Gear Solid, Ape Escape, Wipeout, Street Fighter and MotorStorm.

Sony Computer Entertainment America (SCEA) marketing staff member Mark Valledor indicated in a 2008 interview that Sackboy was intended to become the "next emblematic character" for the PlayStation 3 as LittleBigPlanet ushers in "a new genre of gaming". Alex Evans was quoted in a 2009 issue of The Director where he indicated that he did not mind that Sackboy is closely associated with the PlayStation brand as its mascot like the relationship between Sega and Sonic the Hedgehog, noting that PlayStation is one of the world's most recognizable brands unlike the company he co-founded. According to Tom O'Connor, senior producer at Sony XDEV, the Liverpool-based division responsible for external development and the management of the LittleBigPlanet franchise, Sackboy evolved over time because the game series needed a key avatar. O'Connor observed in a 2012 interview with Eurogamer that Sackboy is increasingly being perceived as more of a defined character as opposed to his original purpose as a blank canvas, and claimed that though Sackboy was not deliberately positioned by Sony as a direct competitor to iconic video game mascot characters like Mario, he indicated that the character's popularity encourages Sony to continue creating video games featuring Sackboy which people would enjoy.

== Concept and design ==
Sackboy was originally conceived as Mr. Yellowhead, the main character of an early precursor of LittleBigPlanet dubbed Craftworld, which was envisioned as a physics-based 2D side-scrolling video game. On 1 December 2005, the four founders of Media Molecule, Kareem Ettouney, Alex Evans, Mark Healey, and David Smith, met with Phil Harrison, the head of development for Sony Worldwide Studios at the time, to pitch Craftworld. Harrison's subsequent enthusiasm for the game involved him participating in a three-hour brainstorming session with the Media Molecule representatives, which was extended from the original half-hour presentation. At this stage, Mr. Yellowhead had a small pink square body and a triangular yellow head, and was described as "consisting of a set of "simple shapes" which is essentially placeholder debug programmer art" created by David Smith for the first playable CraftWorld code. Mr. Yellowhead's arms were controllable with the right analogue stick of the PlayStation 2 controller that Media Molecule had connected to their PC, whilst his legs were controlled with the left stick. The object of the game was to guide Mr. Yellowhead past many obstacles by grabbing onto objects and pushing or rolling them around. Although merely a stand in concept, Mr. Yellowhead paved the way for Sackboy's proportions as well as the things the character is able to do. Ettouney recalled that Smith had an attention to detail when it comes to the character's "personality and very subtle things"; he discussed the initial pitch where Mr. Yellowhead was depicted as straining when pulling a rock, "his little debug arms stretching as he pulled” even though there was no supporting animation, which showcased the character's cheeky personality.

By August 2006 the project, now known as LittleBigPlanet, was greenlit and funding was secured from Sony for the project. To evolve the character concept into a proper character to fit the game's developing art style, Healey worked with Ettouney, who handled concept art duties as well as character designer Francis Pang to come up with further concept art for the character, who was still called YellowHead and still had the eponymous yellow head. Ettouney approached the character's design anatomically, adding legs and arms, pinching Healey's original abstract design for the character's short and pointy legs, and often drew him (Note: Although the character is a customizable player avatar with no defined gender and thus may also be known as Sackgirl or Sackperson, multiple primary and secondary sources cited in this article have referred to the character by the masculine pronoun.) with a "little mosquito antennae" on the head. Pang explored how the head relates to the body, and worked on making the character's body proportions and shapes more aesthetically pleasing. Healey would insist that each design iteration of the character retain a "handmade look" with the buttons, patches, and hessian fabric, aspects of the character which is retained in Sackboy's final design.

A design goal for Sackboy was for the character to help define a game and be "infinitely customisable": the plain version of Sackboy had to be tiny, but still distinctive and iconic, with the option for players to add or amend various facial features or the character's gender markers without changing the body shape. A distinct and prevalent visual feature of Sackboy is the zip fastener, which once had an important gameplay function. According to Ettouney, it is a legacy part of the character's design process, and he noted that the team wanted to explore "a concept of a place where you play, and a place where you build that eventually became the Moon". Healey proposed that Sackboy would have the ability to open his zip, fold in on himself and undergo a creation process inside himself, the idea being that creativity and ideas are all inside an individual, ideas which were ultimately unused. Smith contributed to the design process through his doodles, which explored the character's personality and introduced some subtler shapes to the visual design process like Sackboy's trapezium head, and the wrinkles in the cloth from his expressions. Ettouney credited Smith, a programmer for LittleBigPlanet, with helping finalize the design process and solidify the efforts of the artists and as an example of teamwork dynamics in the early days of the company. Pang refined the final design of Sackboy by combining 4 distinct concepts from himself, Healey, Ettouney and Smith. According to the Media Molecule website, Sackboy was officially created on 1 October 2006. The name "Craftworld" is used for the in-game universe where the LittleBigPlanet series takes place and the planet where Sackboy lives, which is created by ideas and dreams floating out of human heads during sleep.

"From day one he was grabbing and swinging, but for instance he looked strange as he swung about. Sackboy doesn't need to build up momentum to swing forward, he just somehow creates energy from nothing, and the animation needed to support that."

— Francis Pang, Media Molecule Lead Artist

After the concept was finalized, creation of the character model commenced, which would then be textured and prepared for animation. While the animation process of Sackboy helped contribute more character, they evolved only when the designers started making levels and the character is seen in different situations. Pang said the final version of Sackboy's legs felt cute but stumpy and very different from the language of his arms; more importantly, running and jumping movements came across as "weird" when animated. A solution is implemented in the form of the character's little peddling motion as seen in the games. According to Pang, animating Sackboy is a fragmented process which does not feel as satisfactory compared to animating a whole movie, as it involves designing procedural animations rather than animating a scene that gets played out the same way each time. Pang noted that since the player is responsible for controlling the character's actions, he finds satisfaction in seeing what other players do with the character's potential animations. Pang observed that players would use Sackboy's basic acting emotions to communicate to each other whilst playing, which he compared to a structured system of communication not unlike the concept of language. Pang particularly enjoyed working on Sackboy's death animations, as each potentially fatal situation Sackboy encounters required a unique animation to accompany it. Examples of how Sackboy's material would behave in death animations include the character thread being caught which leads to him being literally unraveled, and his fluff spilling out everywhere after bursting apart. Inspiration was drawn from the Tom and Jerry cartoon series when framing the death animations as fairly violent, but still harmless and funny. Some extreme death scenarios were discarded for being overly gruesome, in keeping with the game's emphasis on the "loveable, cute aspect".

Following the game's release, the developmental team were astonished by the level of creativity and effort players have invested into their characters. Pang in particular did not expect that customisation for Sackboy would become a key aspect of LittleBigPlanet's gameplay. In response to the popularity of customisation efforts of Sackboy, the team implemented free game updates to assist players, such as the addition of zoom in and rotation features to make it easier to sticker Sackboy. Following the release of the first game, Media Molecule started working with other brands to make licensed downloadable costumes as downloadable content purchases.

By 2011, Media Molecule made the decision to move on from the character of Sackboy and the LittleBigPlanet franchise, leaving other studios to take over in developing video games for the franchise on Sony's behalf. Media Molecule staff commemorated the "10th birthday" of the character and the first LittleBigPlanet game on 2 November 2018, and recreated The Garden level in their most recent game PlayStation 4 video game Dreams.

== Legacy and cultural impact ==
=== Promotion and merchandise ===
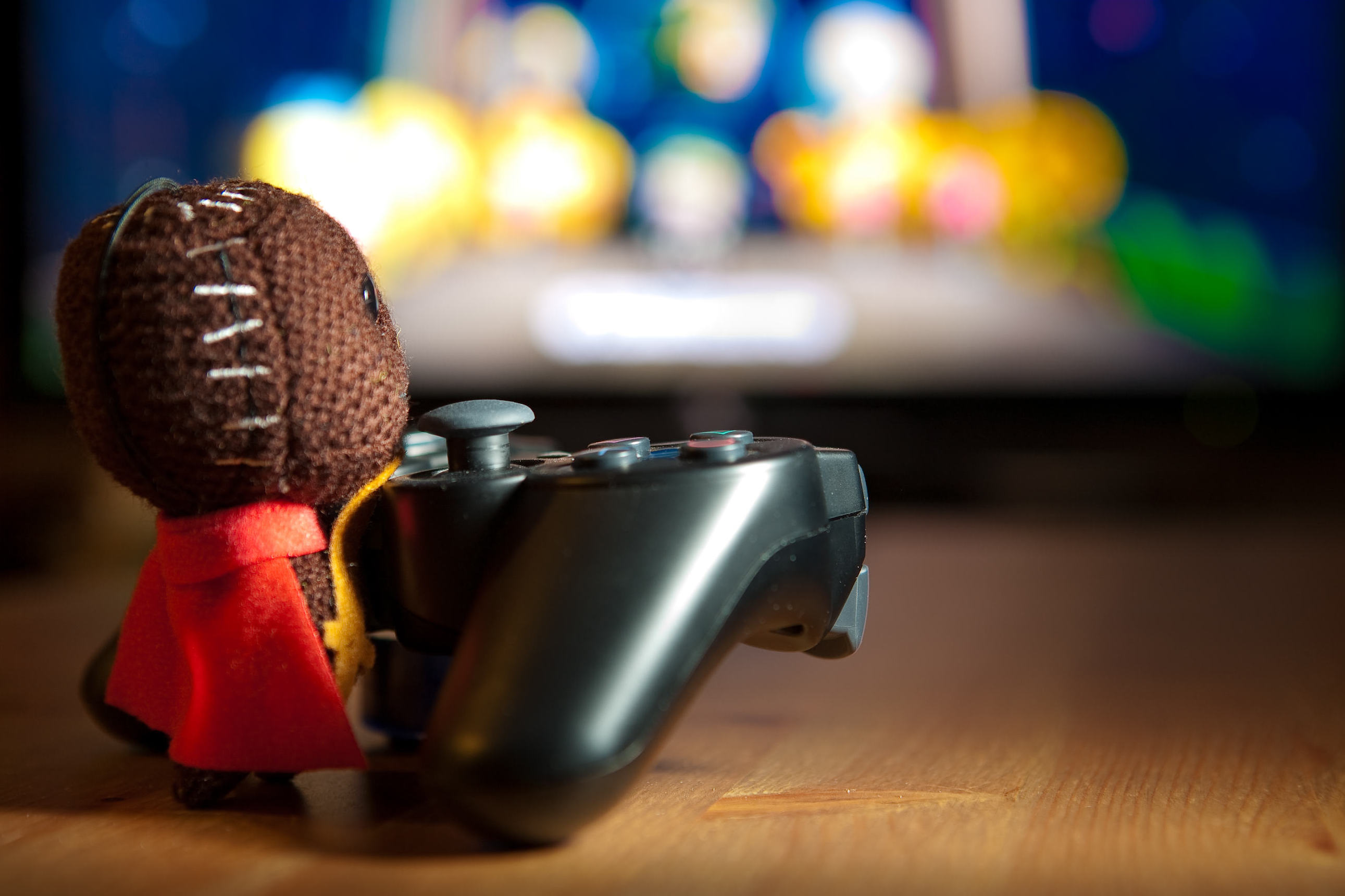
A Sackboy doll next to a PlayStation 3 controller

Sackboy has been featured in promotional material for the PlayStation brand, as well as a wide range of merchandise, such as stuffed toys, fibreglass replicas and cardboard cut-outs. Media Molecule staff said they received a high volume of requests for physical representations of Sackboy, in particular plush dolls, following the release of the first game. O'Connor commented that members of the general public who may not have played the LittleBigPlanet series know who Sackboy is due to the widespread proliferation of Sackboy-themed merchandise; he claimed that Sackboy was "fast becoming an iconic mascot for Sony" and that the character is "almost bigger than the brand" as of 2012. Sony Computer and Entertainment America (SCEA), the subsidiary of Sony in the Americas, commissioned Bennett Awards to design and create an employee recognition award based on Sackboy's likeness to honor outstanding achievement among SCEA employees.

On September 4, 2014, Run Sackboy! Run! was announced featuring Sackboy as the main protagonist. This helped promote the LittleBigPlanet series by offering exclusive costumes for the player by completing goals and challenges. However, Sony Entertainment announced that further support for the game would be shut down on 28 November 2018, yet the game can still be downloaded for free.

=== Reception ===
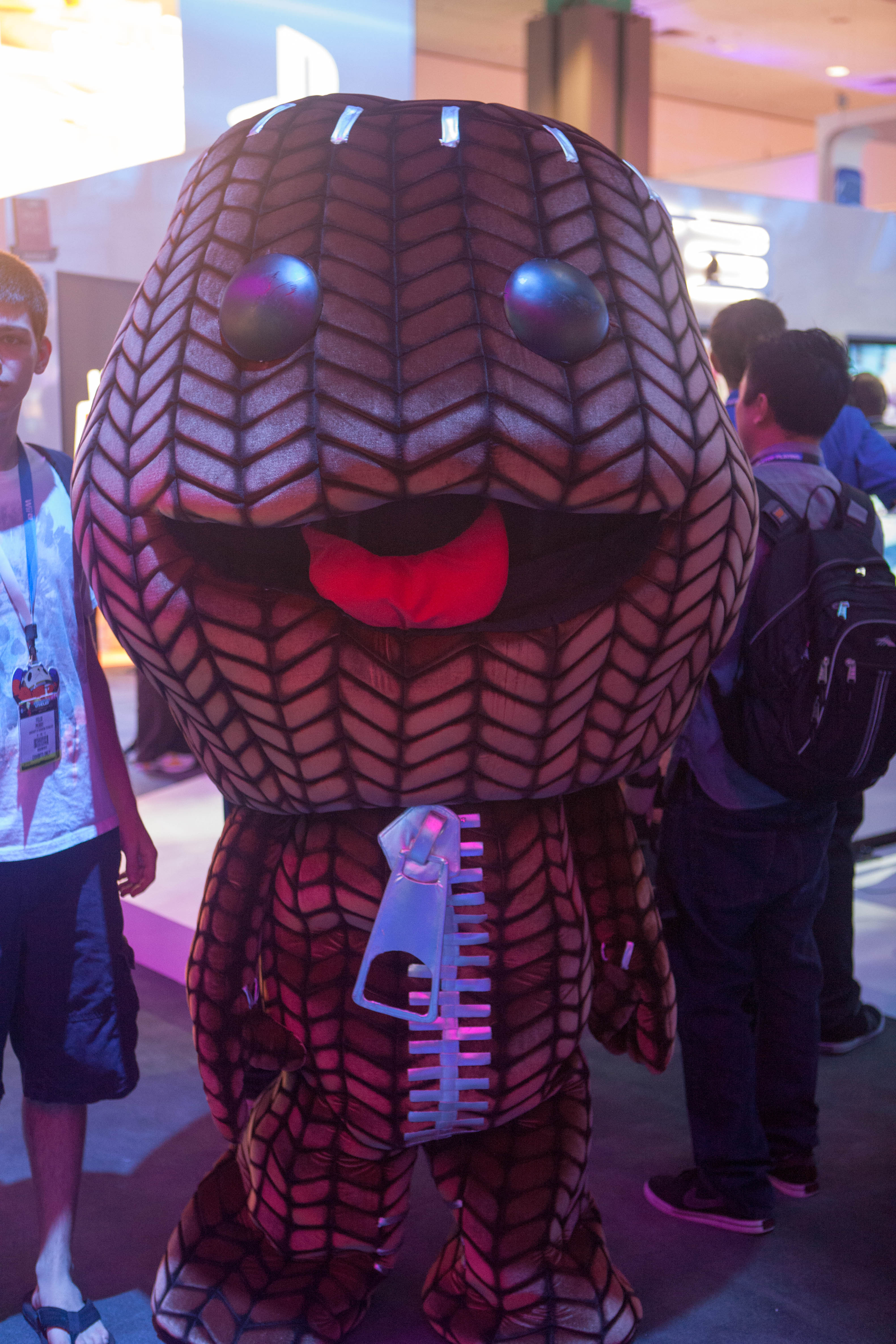
Sackboy cosplayer at E3 2012

Sackboy has received a positive reception as a mascot character, and has drawn numerous comparisons to other video game mascot characters for the PlayStation line, as well as other platforms. Player enthusiasm in customising his appearances have contributed towards the character's popularity, which has also inspired homemade replicas of the character as a real life doll. At the Academy of Interactive Arts & Sciences’ (AIAS) 12th Annual Interactive Achievement Awards in 2009, held at the DICE Summit in Las Vegas, Sackboy's personality and design, as well as Young's performance, was awarded with Outstanding Character Performance. An online gaming community centered on level design, Sackboy Planet, is named after the character.

In an article previewing the then-upcoming LittleBigPlanet published by ABC News in October 2008, Mike Snider from USA Today commented that while Sackboy lacked the panache of iconic characters like Mario and Lara Croft, the character exhibits an engaging everyman appeal, from younger players to experienced gamers. The subsequent commercial and critical success of the LittleBigPlanet video game series has raised the character's prominence in the video game industry. Jonathan Leack from PlayStation Lifestyle named Sackboy, along with Kratos, Nathan Drake, Ratchet and Solid Snake, as PlayStation characters who have made a huge impact on the PlayStation brand and the gaming industry as a whole. Wesley Yin-Poole from Eurogamer noted that by the year 2012, there has been over 30 video game licenses in LittleBigPlanet, over 300 costumes for Sackboy on the PlayStation Store, and over 60 million downloads of downloadable content. He formed the view that Sackboy went from being a customisable player avatar to a "recognizable face in his own right". In the Guinness World Records Gamer's Edition from 2011, Sackboy was voted as the 50th best video game character. In an article published in November 2013, Lucas Sullivan from GamesRadar considered Sackboy to be the best contender the PlayStation brand had to a mascot, noting the character's starring role in kart race and handheld spin-off titles, and the fact that Sony has made substantial investments in marketing the character as the "face of PlayStation". The 2017 book 100 Greatest Video Game Characters discussed Sackboy's significance, noting that pliability is what sets him apart as a character, who can be uniquely the player's own and explore worlds of their making.

Conversely, Sackboy's representation as a gender neutral player avatar in LittleBigPlanet was criticized by Kris Ligman from Pop Matters, who felt the character's concept of "personhood" was undermined by the game's "self-styled pedagogy" as presented through its non-player characters: examples cited were Eve's insistence on a male term and Larry da Vinci's insistence on calling the character "Sackthing" as opposed to "Sackperson".

The announcement and release of Sackboy: A Big Adventure, six years after Sackboy's last appearance in 2014's LittleBigPlanet 3, has been well received. In 2024, a poll conducted by BAFTA with around 4,000 respondents named Sackboy as the fifth most iconic video game character of all time, behind Lara Croft, Mario, Agent 47 and Sonic the Hedgehog.

On May 2, 2025, it was revealed that Sackboy would be removed from the PlayStation Productions logo, sparking backlash towards both LittleBigPlanet and overall PlayStation fans over his removal, with speculation towards PlayStation phasing out the character.

== Appearances in other media ==
A major appearance for Sackboy is in PlayStation All-Stars Battle Royale in which PlayStation characters fight in arenas based on their relative games. LittleBigPlanet's arena was called Dreamscape which crossed over with the PlayStation game Buzz!. Sackboy is a playable character using bounce pads and the Cakeinator from LittleBigPlanet 2 and the Pop-it menu from the LittleBigPlanet series, along with other direct references to the game. This appearance was the first time the character had been featured in a T-rated videogame.

Minecraft created a LittleBigPlanet Mash-up world featuring music and items from the game series, and also included Sackboy and other major characters as costumes for the player. Sackboy and the LittleBigPlanet series were referenced in the PlayStation 5 game Astro's Playroom, a celebration of the PlayStation brand.

Fall Guys hosted an event from 1–5 December 2021 featuring Sackboy as a costume. And similarly in Sackboy: A Big Adventure, Fall Guys costumes were added to help promote the game. Sackboy has made more prominent appearances in other games, typically as costumes or Easter eggs. He appeared in games such as ModNation Racers, The Order: 1886 and Uncharted 3: Drake's Deception.

In the PlayStation 3 and PlayStation 4 versions of Costume Quest 2, player characters are able to don a Sackboy Halloween costume that lets them play as Sackboy during combat.
