= Media Molecule =

British video game developer

Media Molecule Ltd.

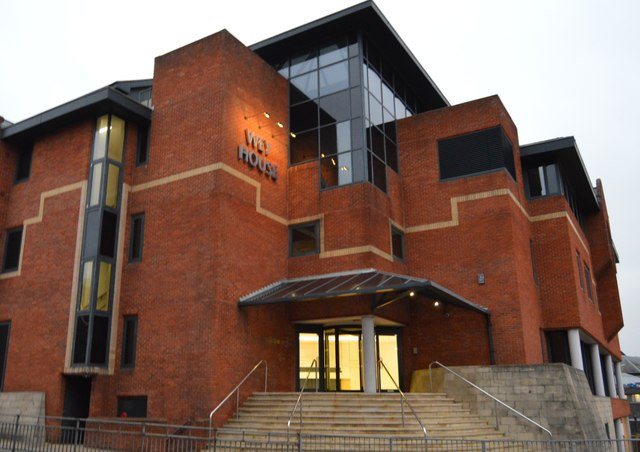
- Headquarters of Media Molecule in Guildford
- Company type: Subsidiary
- Industry: Video games
- Predecessor: Lionhead Studios
- Founded: 4 January 2006; 20 years ago
- Founders: Kareem Ettouney; Alex Evans; Mark Healey; David Smith (Note: Alex Evans, Kareem Ettouney, Mark Healey, and David Smith are the principal founders of the company, while Chris Lee (entitled the "man with the business plan") and accountant Mags Hardwick were also part of the founding team. Smith stated in an interview that, "I am one of the original four or five or six [co-founders], it depends on how you count us." Some sources erroneously name Siobhan Reddy as a co-founder; she joined a few months after the company's incorporation.)
- Headquarters: Guildford, Surrey, England
- Key people: John Beech (creative director); Siobhan Reddy (studio director)
- Products: LittleBigPlanet (2008–2014); Tearaway (2013–2015); Dreams (2020)
Financial data
Revenue	▼£10.5 million (2019)
Operating income	▼£1.1 million (2019)
Net income	▼£1.1 million (2019)
Total assets	▲£71.2 million (2019)
Total equity	▲£36.0 million (2019)
- Number of employees: 135 (2023)
- Parent: PlayStation Studios (2010–present)
- Website: mediamolecule.com

Media Molecule Ltd. is a British video game developer based in Guildford, Surrey. Founded in 2006 by Mark Healey, Alex Evans, David Smith, and Kareem Ettouney, Sony Computer Entertainment acquired the firm in 2010. It became part of SCE Worldwide Studios (now PlayStation Studios). The company is best known for developing the LittleBigPlanet series, 2013's Tearaway, and 2020's Dreams for PlayStation consoles.

Before the company's formation, the co-founders, led by Healey, developed Rag Doll Kung Fu, whilst working at Lionhead Studios. They left Lionhead in 2005 and presented an early precursor of LittleBigPlanet to Sony. Sony was interested, so in January 2006 they secured their funding from Sony for six months and Media Molecule was incorporated. The studio signed a deal with Sony Computer Entertainment Europe in June. This allowed Media Molecule to create LittleBigPlanet for the PlayStation 3, with Sony owning the intellectual property. Soon after, LittleBigPlanet began production; it was released in October 2008 to critical acclaim. Sony acquired Media Molecule for an undisclosed sum two years later.

In 2011, the developer released a sequel, LittleBigPlanet 2. LittleBigPlanet spawned a series of games developed by other studios, often in collaboration with Media Molecule. The studio developed 2013's Tearaway and its extended remake, Tearaway Unfolded. In 2016, they opened a small studio in Brighton, East Sussex. Dreams was released in February 2020. The studio has won numerous awards, including Studio of the Year from the 2008 Spike Video Game Awards. Media Molecule's philosophy is to have as few employees as achievable.

== History ==
=== Background (2005–2006) ===
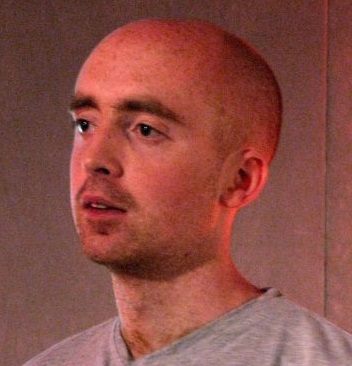
Alex Evans

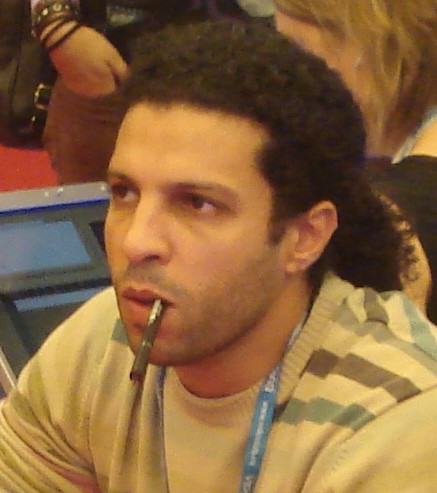
Kareem Ettouney

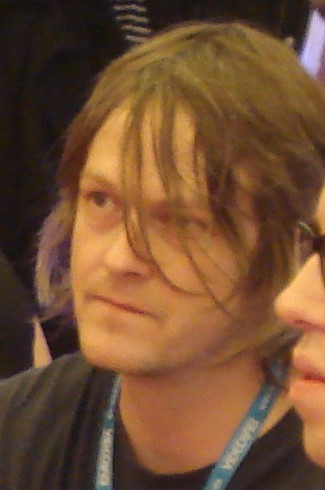
Mark Healey

Evans, Ettouney, Healey, and David Smith (not pictured) founded Media Molecule.

Four former Lionhead Studios' employees—Alex Evans, Kareem Ettouney, Mark Healey, and David Smith—founded Media Molecule, incorporating it on 4 January 2006. Chris Lee and Mags Hardwick are also among the founding team. Evans and Smith were both technical directors; Healey was the creative director whilst Ettouney was the art director. This was until they left at variously points in the early 2020s.

Before the founding of Media Molecule, Evans and Healey worked at Bullfrog Productions for its co-founder Peter Molyneux. Molyneux later went on to co-found Lionhead Studios, with Evans and Healey being two of its first employees. Soon after, the co-founders, led primarily by Healey, developed Rag Doll Kung Fu in their spare time whilst working at Lionhead Studios. Healey demonstrated the game at the 2005 Game Developers Conference (GDC). Valve employees were in the audience because the firm was interested in the game. They were looking for a "low risk, low cost" third-party game to test on Steam; it became the first non-Valve game to be released on the platform in October 2005.

Also in 2005, whilst at Lionhead, the co-founders were working a game called The Room using clay tubes and portals. In retrospect, the founders noted it had similarities to 2007's Portal. They also demonstrated it at GDC 2005. The founders met with Valve who were interested in hiring them to develop The Room or another game idea, but nothing came of it. Evans noted if they had, Portal may not have been developed. The founders left Lionhead Studios in December 2005 and met with Sony Computer Entertainment (SCE) regarding a game idea.

=== LittleBigPlanet, formation, and Sony deal (2006–2008) ===
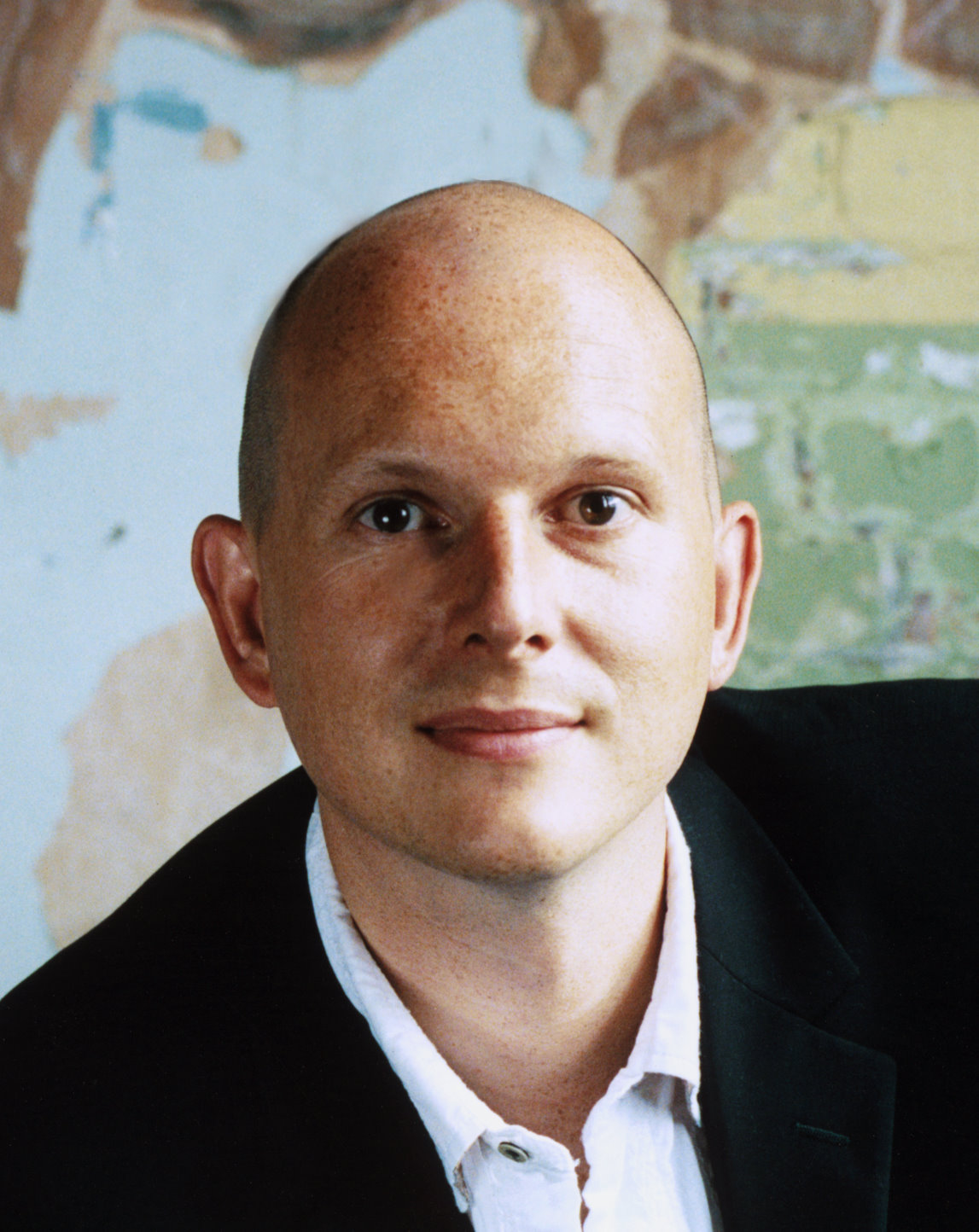
Phil Harrison

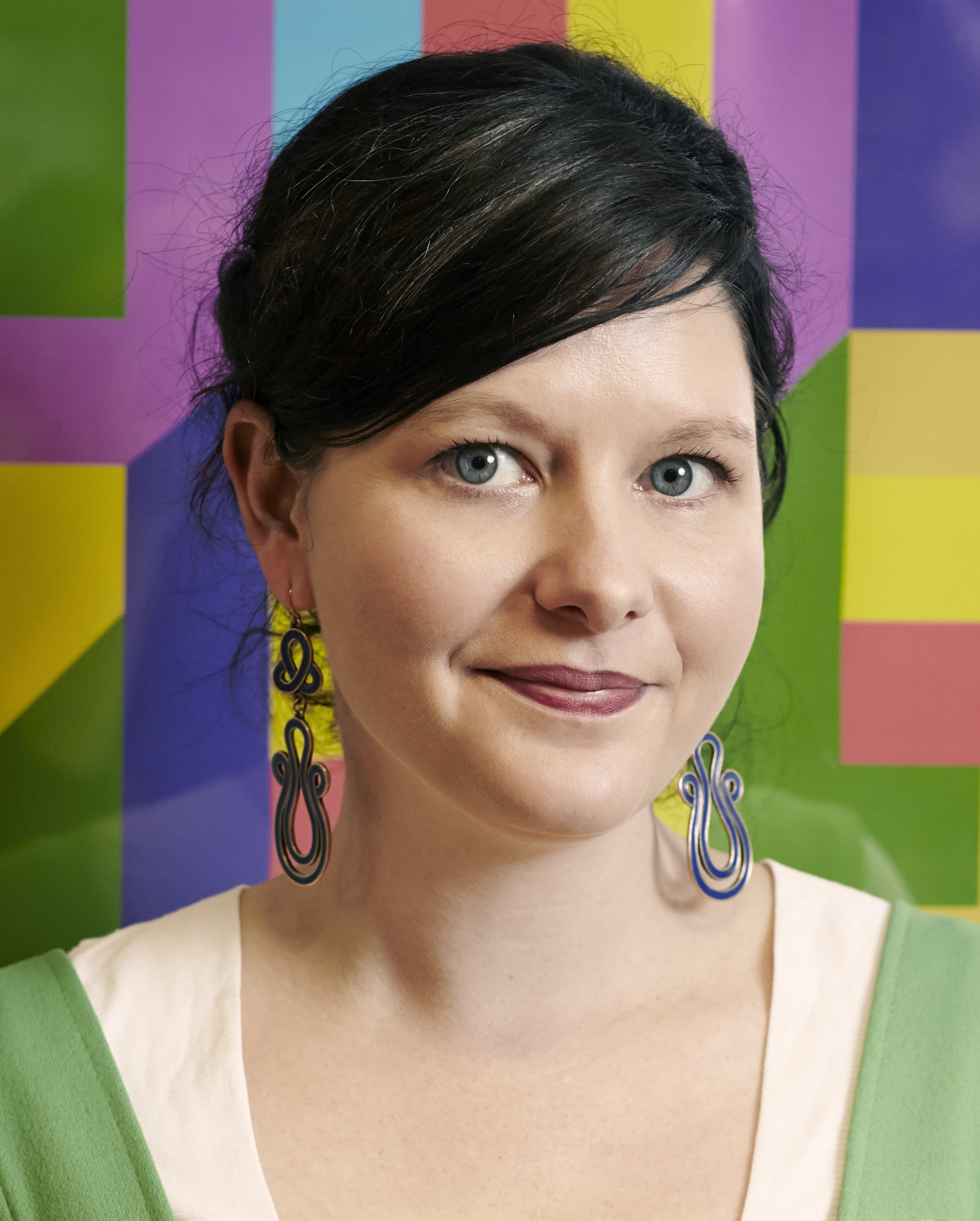
Siobhan Reddy

Harrison was described by Evans as "completely key and pivotal" to LittleBigPlanet's early days. Reddy is the studio director at Media Molecule.

They pitched an early precursor of what LittleBigPlanet was to become dubbed Craftworld to Phil Harrison, the head of development for Sony Worldwide Studios. Craftworld was a physics-based 2D side-scrolling game similar to LittleBigPlanet. Its main character was Mr. Yellowhead, who would later become Sackboy. Evans said that the pitch, which he described as "pretty vague", was "meant to be a 30-minute pitch for our idea for a game called Craftworld that soon turned into a three-hour brainstorming session". Despite this Sony were interested, partly because of Harrison's enthusiasm for the game, according to Smith. In January 2006, they secured their funding from Sony for six months. They set up their office, incorporated Media Molecule, and started pre-production of the game. Evans described the company's formation as a combination of the boost from Rag Doll Kung Fu, some new ideas bubbling in his head, and the new wave of consoles around the corner. In March, they moved into a studio in Guildford, Surrey; around this time Siobhan Reddy, the studio director, joined Media Molecule. Reddy is occasionally regarded as the fifth co-founder.

On 1 June 2006, Media Molecule announced they had signed an exclusive deal with SCE. This agreement allowed Media Molecule to create an original game exclusively for the PlayStation 3. The deal included SCE owning the intellectual property and that LittleBigPlanet would be available only on PlayStation consoles. Evans said, "SCE have proven to be the perfect partner for us. They immediately understood both our ambition for the game as well as our development style." Pre-production was extended until August when Media Molecule met with Sony executives, including Harrison, to decide whether to greenlight the game's production. Harrison described the pitch for production as the best meeting he had ever had. Media Molecule then started full development. In 2019, Harrison reaffirmed this sentiment, citing Evan's different approach. Instead of using PowerPoint, he wrote his own interactive 'PowerPoint' so that the game was playable through the presentation. Harrison said this demonstrated their innovative thinking and the way Media Molecule wanted to challenge conventions impressed him.

"The green-light meeting in August: I would summarise it by saying in my career I've probably seen close to 1000 game pitches. This is the best meeting I have ever had. It was the best presentation of a vision executed perfectly, which was fun, which was playable, and showed the potential of where this could go. I must admit I floated out of that meeting room thinking that this was just the most fantastic opportunity that was in front of us."

— Phil Harrison, describing the LittleBigPlanet's green-light meeting in August 2006.

Phil Harrison announced LittleBigPlanet at the Game Developers Conference on 7 March 2007, in San Francisco; only upon arrival did Healey and others realise they were a part of his keynote with Healey. He noted that, "Sony were very, very much behind the game, much more than we had previously thought." The keynote included a demonstration by Healey, Evans, Harrison, and Peter Smith (senior producer on LittleBigPlanet) showing core gameplay elements throughout a game level and explaining players could create their own levels with tools provided to them within the game. LittleBigPlanet was one game that Sony considered fit their "Game 3.0" concept of user-generated content. Harrison originally suggested having LittleBigPlanet a free-to-play with downloadable content (DLC) along with a mechanism to monetise user-generated content to reward the best creators for their innovation. After viewing GDC 2007, Kenneth Young joined the studio in 2007 as their audio and music lead after being infatuated by LittleBigPlanet, Healey, and Evans. Some time before its release, the development of a sequel began. In July, Media Molecule had 28 employees. LittleBigPlanet was released between 27 October 2008 and 5 November across different regions. LittleBigPlanet was critically acclaimed by critics, winning over 90 awards including the Award for Artistic Achievement at the 5th British Academy Video Games Awards.

=== LittleBigPlanet 2, new games, and Sony acquisition (since 2009) ===
By January 2009, Media Molecule had 34 employees. A month later, it announced LittleBigPlanet for the PlayStation Portable at the Destination PlayStation meeting. SCE Studio Cambridge had been the primary developer, alongside Media Molecule. They released it in November to positive critical reviews. It was announced on 2 March 2010 that SCE had purchased Media Molecule for an undisclosed sum. Shuhei Yoshida, president of SIE Worldwide Studios, praised the studio's innovation and noted they had "world-class credentials". Evans added that, "Since Media Molecule's inception, we've had a uniquely close relationship with SCE. Over the years they have consistently shown their dedication to Creative Gaming and Media Molecule, not only through their support of the company, but their willingness to take risks and embrace our often unusual approach and ideas." It brought the total number of developers at SCE Worldwide Studios to fifteen. In May 2010, the company officially announced a sequel entitled LittleBigPlanet 2; they released it in January 2011 to critical acclaim. In June, it was confirmed that LittleBigPlanet PS Vita was not being developed by Media Molecule but by Double Eleven, Tarsier Studios and XDev.

Development of Tearaway began in May 2011. In July at Gamelab 2011 in Barcelona, Reddy announced that Media Molecule were stepping away from LittleBigPlanet to focus on new game ideas. Media Molecule added on Twitter that they would always be involved in LittleBigPlanet to some degree. In July at a Develop conference, the co-founders said they were still involved with LittleBigPlanet 2 pointing to the upcoming PlayStation Move level pack as an example of their on-going work. Healey remarked that, "It's a bit like, if you think of LittleBigPlanet as having a child, Sackboy was our child, you get to the stage where they want to leave home, It's kind of like that." Evans elaborated by saying that Media Molecule is no longer a "single-threaded company" and noted developing similar games all the time would become stale. In January 2012, Media Molecule had spent £4.1 million on research and development on new, innovative games aiming to reduce the reliance on the LittleBigPlanet brand name.

In August 2012, they announced Tearaway led by Smith and Rex Crowle, with 15 developers working on it. The rest of the studio was working on another project—Dreams—which was in the research and development phase. Around this time, Media Molecule had over 40 employees. They released Tearaway in November 2013 for the PlayStation Vita. In March 2015, Young left Media Molecule to become a game audio freelancer, though he continued working on Unfolded. Two years later, Media Molecule and Tarsier Studios released Tearaway Unfolded, an expanded remake of Tearaway for the PlayStation 4. Crowle and LittleBigPlanet programmer, Moo Yu, founded Foam Sword in November 2015 and released their debut title Knights and Bikes in August 2019.

Whilst Media Molecule may have moved away from LittleBigPlanet, they have collaborated with other studios and contributed to new games. This includes: 2009's LittleBigPlanet, 2010's Sackboy's Prehistoric Moves, 2012's LittleBigPlanet Karting, and 2014's LittleBigPlanet 3.

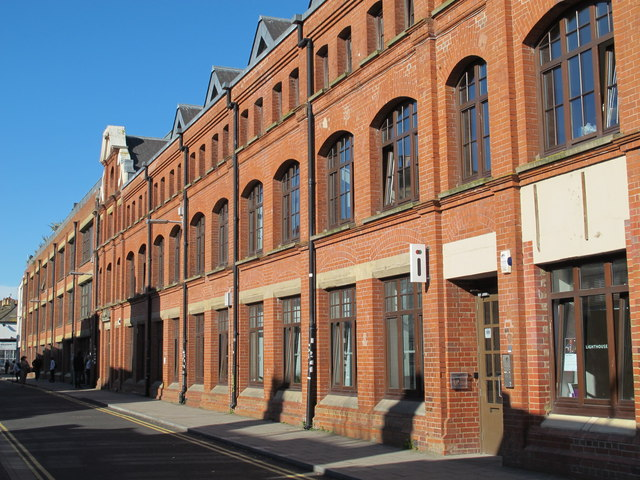
The venue of Media Molecule's satellite studio in Brighton, East Sussex

In October 2016, Media Molecule opened Media Molecule Brighton a 'satellite' (small) studio in Brighton, East Sussex. They opened this workspace to accommodate a group of developers who had been commuting to and from their headquarters, allowing them to reduce travel times. The venue where the office is located is called the "Lighthouse" and hosts offices for other organisations like Culture24.

The company announced Dreams, a sandbox video game with a game creation system, at Sony Computer Entertainment's press conference at E3 2015. In April 2019, the game was made available via early access, a first for a Sony game. In December 2019, Sony announced a February 2020 release date which it met.

In September 2020, Evans announced he was leaving after serving for 13 years as a technical director at the studio, saying he wanted a break from game development. He has since joined Nvidia as a researcher. In December 2022, Ettouney announced he was leaving the company in January 2023.

In April 2023, Media Molecule announced that it would stop supporting Dreams in September of the same year. Their future game will not be related to Dreams. Healey left the company on 17 April 2023. John Beech was announced as the new creative director after Healey's departure. Beech has been at the developer since 2009 and has served as a designer, senior principal designer, and finally as a lead designer.

In October 2023, it was reported that Media Molecule had laid off about 20 employees. The company confirmed that layoffs had occurred, but not state how many people were affected. This was alongside about 900 layoffs across PlayStation Studios including the closure of London Studio. Media Molecule was reportedly near to being closed instead of London Studio. In August 2025, it was announced that David Smith had left the company after 20 years.

== Philosophy ==
Media Molecule aims to have as few employees as possible. In 2006, Evans said that Media Molecule wants to stay as small as possible whilst being able to produce a AAA game, aiming to keep the number of employees below thirty. Healey said, "I am really intent on keeping us a small focused team. I've had enough of working on big, bloated teams, you get too much deadwood in those situations. Everyone at Media Molecule matters." Healey added there are always tensions between people in development, however, once there are too many they can cause tensions comparing it to being in a soap opera. Media Molecule had 135 employees in 2023, before layoffs occurred in October.

Other game developers have adopted this policy, most notably Hideo Kojima of Kojima Productions. After visiting Media Molecule in 2016, when he was re-establishing the company, Kojima modelled the new studio around Media Molecule, wanting "a small, intimate type of studio". Kojima praised the high number of female employees and the relaxed atmosphere comparing it to a family. He set a limit of one hundred employees at Kojima Productions, similar to Media Molecule.

== Games ==
Year	Game title	Platform(s)				Notes	Ref(s).
Year	Game title	PS3	PS4	PSP	PS Vita	Notes	Ref(s).
2008	LittleBigPlanet	Yes	No	No	No	—N/a	
2009	LittleBigPlanet	No	No	Yes	No	Primarily developed by SCE Cambridge Studio	
2010	Sackboy's Prehistoric Moves	Yes	No	No	No	Co-developed alongside Supermassive Games and XDev	
2011	LittleBigPlanet 2	Yes	No	No	No	—N/a	
2012	LittleBigPlanet Karting	Yes	No	No	No	Developed by United Front Games and San Diego Studio with Media Molecule in a supporting role	
2013	Tearaway	No	No	No	Yes	—N/a	
2014	LittleBigPlanet 3	Yes	Yes	No	No	Developed by Sumo Digital with Media Molecule being a contributor in the early stages of development	
2015	Tearaway Unfolded	No	Yes	No	No	Co-developed alongside Tarsier Studios	
2020	Dreams	No	Yes	No	No	—N/a	

=== LittleBigPlanet (2008–2014) ===
As the creator of the LittleBigPlanet series Media Molecule developed the first two games—LittleBigPlanet (2008) and LittleBigPlanet 2 (2011) for the PlayStation 3—in addition to co-developing the PlayStation Portable version of the same name (2009) with SCE Studio Cambridge, the primary developer. It is a series of puzzle platformer games that follow Sackboy a small, brown, anthropomorphic, humanoid creature made of fabric with a zip fastener and button eyes across a variety of levels. The series features user-generated content, allowing players to create levels which can be shared and played by others online. The three games have collectively sold 8.5 million units. Sackboy has featured in every LittleBigPlanet game and is a mascot for the PlayStation brand. In 2011, Media Molecule stepped away from the LittleBigPlanet series. Despite this, they have collaborated and contributed with other studios for other games in the series, including Sackboy's Prehistoric Moves (2010), LittleBigPlanet Karting (2012), and LittleBigPlanet 3 (2014).

=== Tearaway (2013–2015) ===
Media Molecule created the Tearaway series and developed Tearaway (2013) for the PlayStation Vita and co-developed Tearaway Unfolded (2015), an expanded remake of the earlier game, for the PlayStation 4 with Tarsier Studios. Tearaway is a platform-adventure game that follows Iota or Atoi through a world made of paper. The game utilises the PlayStation Vita's numerous sensors and inputs when interacting with the in-game environment like the rear touchpad, touchscreen, and cameras. Both games received "generally favourable reviews" according to review aggregator Metacritic.

=== Dreams (2020–2023) ===
Dreams is a game creation system allowing players to create and share their own levels similar to that of LittleBigPlanet. Players can create games from a range of different genres including point-and-click adventures, puzzle-platformers, and shoot'em ups. Players interact with the game's world by controlling an "imp", similar to a mouse cursor, to create new items and characters. Released in February 2020, it received "generally favourable reviews" according to review aggregator Metacritic. In April 2023, Media Molecule announced that it would stop supporting the game in September of the same year.

== Awards ==
Year	Award	Category	Result	Ref(s).
2008	Spike Video Game Awards	Studio of the Year	Won	
2009	Develop Award	Best Independent Developer	Won	
2009	Develop Award	Best New Studio	Won	
2009	BAFTA Children's Award	Video Game	Won	
2009	BAFTA Games Award	Artistic Achievement	Won	
2009	Golden Joystick Award	Family Game of the Year	Won	
2011	Develop Award	Family	Won	
2012	BAFTA Games Award	Game Innovation	Won	
2012	BAFTA Games Award	Artistic Achievement	Nominated	
2014	BAFTA Games Award	Mobile & Handheld	Won	
2014	BAFTA Games Award	Family	Won	
2014	BAFTA Games Award	Artistic Achievement	Won	
2016	BAFTA Games Award	Young Game Designers: Industry Hero	Won	
