= LittleBigPlanet (2009 video game) =

2009 video game

- Developer: SCEE Cambridge Studio (Note: Media Molecule assisted on development.)
- Publisher: Sony Computer Entertainment
- Series: LittleBigPlanet
- Platform: PlayStation Portable
- Release: NA: 17 November 2009; EU: 20 November 2009; JP: 3 December 2009
- Genre: Puzzle-platform
- Mode: Single-player

LittleBigPlanet (sometimes referred to as LittleBigPlanet PSP to differentiate it from the PlayStation 3 game of the same name) is a 2009 puzzle-platform video game developed by SCEE Cambridge Studio and published by Sony Computer Entertainment for the PlayStation Portable. It is the second installment in the LittleBigPlanet series, featuring a brand new story mode; it was the first game in the series to not be developed primarily by series creator Media Molecule, who nevertheless assisted on development. It was released on 17 November 2009 in North America and 20 November 2009 in PAL regions. The game's servers have been shut down since 30 July 2016.

== Gameplay ==
A screenshot of LittleBigPlanet

The game's gameplay is the same as the original PlayStation 3 version, albeit without the co-operative multiplayer aspect and one of the 'layers' in which the level 'set' is created within. The PlayStation 3 version has three 'thick' layers and four 'thin' layers, however LittleBigPlanet PSP only has two 'thick' layers and three 'thin' layers. Additionally, where the PS3 game allowed Sackboy only 3-6 respawns at each level checkpoint before needing to restart the level, the PSP game has unlimited respawns. The game features an all new campaign with brand new levels, and consists of an introduction, 23 main levels, and 14 mini levels, 2 of which are "Mini Games". These levels were created by SCE Studio Cambridge, and are based around seven different themes that draw inspiration from real-world locations including Chinese gardens, dry Australian deserts and icy Alpine stages. Players must traverse complicated mazes during levels using devices including switches, rotating platforms and floating lanterns that can be ridden or grabbed. The main objective of each level is to move from one side of the stage to the other, dodging deadly contraptions such as electric snakes shooting out and trying to kill your sackperson. The game also features user-generated content similar to the PlayStation 3 original.

The game's overall goal is to capture prize bubbles which include stickers, costumes, materials, and objects players may use to customize their own Sackboy and levels. Players can create their own levels from a blank slate or template using various items gained in the game and items ready-made by the game's developers. These levels can be uploaded to the game's online servers to be shared among the community.

== Plot ==
The game's story is a sequel to the original PlayStation 3 game. Sackboy, the main character, decides to take a holiday walkabout around the world. The player starts in Down Under, a theme based on Australia, where they meet Bruce, a helpful character who gets the player started in the game. The player climbs to the Cave of Dreams where they meet the Mystic. It is revealed that there is to be a massive carnival in Brazil, and the player needs to go around the world to find the various creator curators and get them to go to the carnival. The player goes to The Orient in China and meets the Emperor, who has a dragon's egg in his treasure room. The player retrieves it and gives it to the dragon with the Emperor's apologies. The Emperor decides to go to the carnival.

The player travels to the Genie's realm, The Bazaar, set in Persia. The monkey thief king steals the Genie lamp from its owner. The player travels through the realm to retrieve it. It is returned to the owner after the player wins in a game of "Monkey Swing." The Genie helps them travel to Golden Sands (located in Arabia) on a magic carpet where a prince is building an amusement park and needs the player to build and test its safety features. Once they have that accomplished, the prince wants to go to the carnival.

The player travels to the Alpine Mountains where Clock Hans meets them when part of the roof is destroyed. He promises to go to the carnival if the player finds his children when they are lost while he repairs the roof. The player does so and Clock Hans gives permission to use his teleportation device, and the player ends up in Tinsel Town, which is based on Hollywood. The director has the player act as a stunt-man in his movies: LittleBugPlanet and The Sewn Identity. Once the movies are tested, they are both hits and the director comes to the carnival.

Once in Brazil, the player walks throughout other creators' floats and helps them with getting them working. The Director needs a photo with them, Leading Lady and Big Ron. On Clock Hans' float the player helps to fix the clock on the lower deck of the float. Prince Funubis needs to start an oil well on his float. The Genie gets stuck inside his lamp and needs Sackboy to get him out. Emperor Sario needs to set some fireworks off on his float. The Mystic gives the player a final object for his float inside Big Croc. Finally, the player adds the finishing touches to their parade float, and rides throughout Brazil on it as the end credits roll.

== Development ==
In a February 2009 press release, Sony announced a version of LittleBigPlanet for the PlayStation Portable was being developed by SCEE Cambridge Studio in conjunction with Media Molecule. The game was tentatively referred to as LittleBigPlanet PSP and was first shown publicly at E3 2009 where two Australian-themed levels from the Story Mode were available to play. One of these was a surfing minigame where the goal was to keep Sackboy on a moving surfboard for as long as possible and the other was a full, platforming level. The game's aesthetics are very similar to those of the PlayStation 3 version and many similar gameplay mechanics, such as sticker switches, feature in the PSP game. As with the PlayStation 3 game, Stephen Fry provides voice overs for the English-language version of the game. Also, as with the PlayStation 3 game, comedy writer Dean Wilkinson provided the script for Fry, as well as writing in-game dialogue and characters. Unlike its PlayStation 3 counterpart, multiplayer gameplay does not feature in LittleBigPlanet on the PSP. However, the creation and sharing of levels has been carried over.

=== Downloadable content ===
Several packs of paid or free downloadable content (DLC), including items such as materials, stickers and costumes, some being ports from the original PS3 version of the game. The free kits are all a single costume with the exception being the Savannah costumes, which include both of the costumes that are given to the player in the 'Savannah' section of the original PlayStation 3 game. In the PlayStation Store; A set of "Purchasable Levels" were released called the Turbo! Pack of 6 Levels, 121 Objects, 28 Materials, 112 Stickers, 20 Sounds Objects, 6 Music files, and 1 Background.

== Reception ==
Reception

Aggregate scores
Aggregator	Score
GameRankings	87.7%
Metacritic	87/100

Review scores
Publication	Score
Eurogamer	9/10
Famitsu	76
GameSpot	8/10
IGN	9/10

The game has received generally positive reviews from most critics, both Eurogamer and IGN gave LittleBigPlanet a score of 9/10 commenting that the PSP version was just as good as the PlayStation 3 version and went on to say that the title was "one of the stand-out titles" for the console, while IGN commented that "The platforming's fun, the create tools are solid, and online's undoubtedly impressive – especially considering that these upload/download features are on the PSP." GameSpot scored it an 8 out of 10 criticizing the short storyline, the limited Sackboy manipulation, and the lack of multiplayer, but they praised the fact that almost everything else was intact from the PlayStation 3 version.

During the 13th Annual Interactive Achievement Awards, the Academy of Interactive Arts & Sciences nominated LittleBigPlanet for "Portable Game of the Year" and "Outstanding Achievement in Portable Game Design".
