= Siobhan Reddy =

South African-Australian game executive

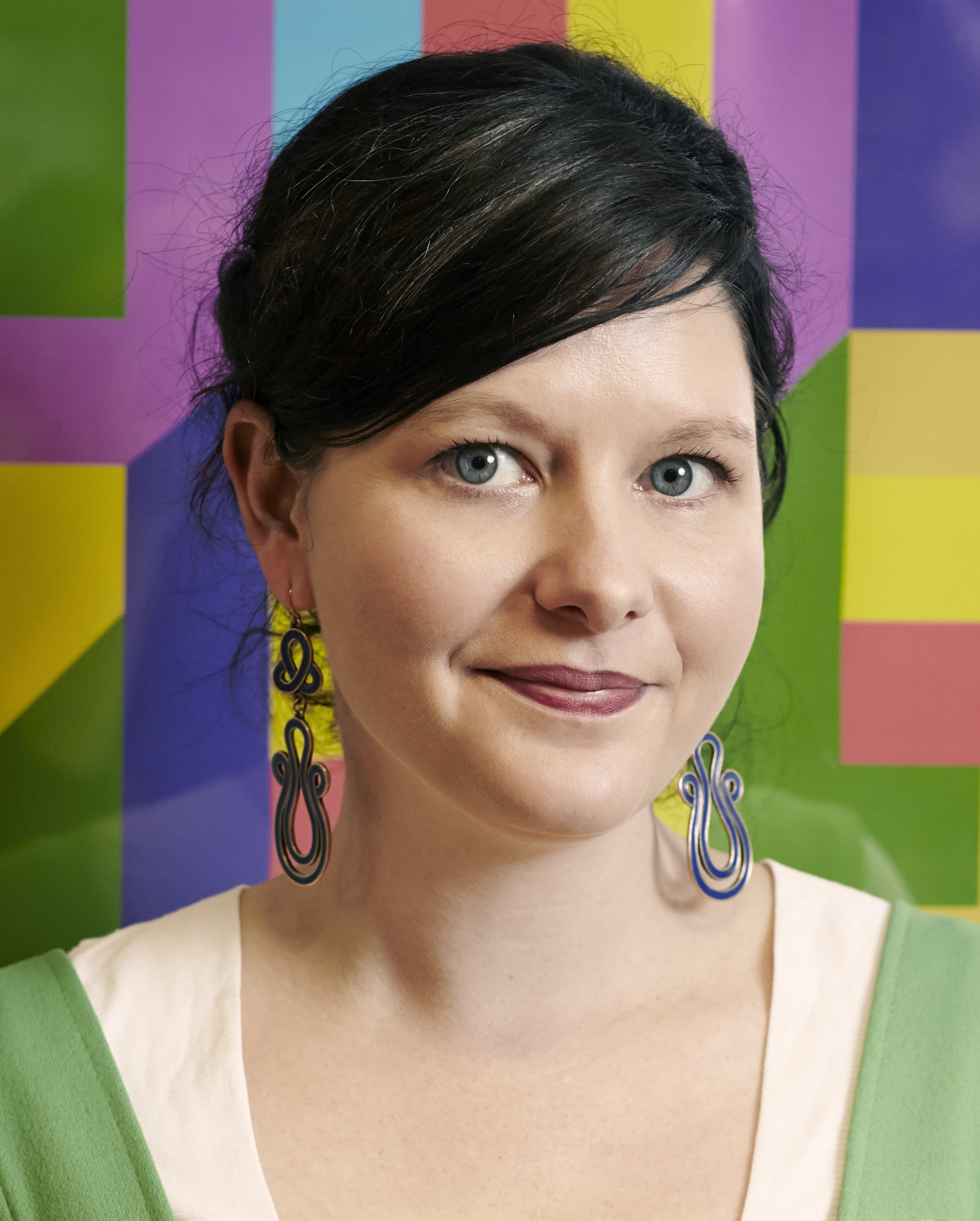
- Born: 1979 (age 46–47); South Africa
- Occupation: Studio director
- Employer: Media Molecule

Siobhan Reddy (born 1979) is a South African-Australian video game executive. She is the studio director of Media Molecule, a video game development studio based in Guildford in the United Kingdom, most famous for their debut title LittleBigPlanet.

== Biography ==
Reddy was born in South Africa in 1979, but grew up in Campbelltown, New South Wales in Australia. She attended Macarthur Anglican School and Santa Sabina College in New South Wales, where she became interested in filmmaking and technology. She moved to the United Kingdom at the age of 18 to start work as a production assistant at Perfect Entertainment. In 1999, she started to work at Criterion Games, and then left in 2006 to join the newly formed Media Molecule along with Mark Healey, Alex Evans, David Smith and Kareem Ettouney. At Media Molecule, Reddy took up the role of executive producer, but in 2009 she was named studio director. Reddy has been a vocal advocate for increasing diversity in the gaming industry. She has frequently spoken about the importance of fostering inclusive work environments and ensuring that game development teams represent a wide range of backgrounds. In 2021, she was included in BBC’s 100 Women list, recognizing her efforts to promote diversity and inclusion in gaming.

She is persistent in her desires to see more women working in games, and for games to address the needs of their female audiences more.

== Awards ==
- In 2009, she won the Production Award at the first ever Microsoft Women in Gaming Awards, and at the same awards in 2014 she won the Innovator Award.
- In 2013, she was named one of the 100 most powerful women in the UK by BBC's Woman's Hour, and Australian Woman of the Year by Qantas.
- In 2014, she was named in Fortune's 10 Powerful Women in Gaming and shortlisted in The Hospital Club's hclub100 awards, celebrating the 100 most influential and innovative people working across Britain's creative industries.
- In 2019, she is listed as one of the 100 most influential women in video games in the UK games industry by Gamesindustry.biz.
- Reddy was given the BAFTA Fellowship award in 2021 for "her pioneering work on advocacy for diversity, inclusion and creative and collaborative working culture".
- Siobhan Reddy was awarded an OBE in 2021 for services to the games industry and promoting inclusivity in game development.
