= LittleBigPlanet 3 =

2014 video game

- Packaging artwork with the game's four protagonists. From left to right: Swoop, Sackboy, Big Toggle, Little Toggle, and OddSock.
- Developer: Sumo Digital (Note: Additional work by Media Molecule)
- Publisher: Sony Computer Entertainment
- Producers: Simon Livesey; John O'Brien; Michelle Leonard; Tony Casson; Oscar Wemmert; Justin Manning
- Writers: Bob Baldwin; Dean Wilkinson; Justin Villiers; Max Kinnings; Dave Mervik
- Series: LittleBigPlanet
- Platforms: PlayStation 3; PlayStation 4
- Release: NA: 18 November 2014; EU: 26 November 2014; AU: 26 November 2014; UK: 28 November 2014
- Genres: Puzzle-platform, sandbox
- Modes: Single-player, multiplayer

LittleBigPlanet 3 is a 2014 puzzle-platform video game developed by Sumo Digital and published by Sony Computer Entertainment for the PlayStation 3 and PlayStation 4. It is the third main installment in the LittleBigPlanet series and sixth entry overall. It was announced at Sony's E3 2014 media briefing on 9 June 2014. It was developed primarily by Sumo Digital, with XDev and series creator Media Molecule assisting in an undisclosed capacity.

LittleBigPlanet 3 received generally positive reviews upon release. Critics praised the visuals, the create mode, and new gameplay elements such as the addition of the new characters. The game did however draw criticism for its technical issues and the short length of its campaign mode.

== Gameplay ==
LittleBigPlanet 3 features gameplay elements very similar to the first two games in the main LittleBigPlanet series, LittleBigPlanet and LittleBigPlanet 2. It is a puzzle-platform game with elements of a sandbox game. Like other LittleBigPlanet games, LittleBigPlanet 3 places a heavy emphasis on creation. Players create their own levels, characters, and objects, such as power ups, tools, decorations, stickers, or vehicles, hub levels, Pods (effectively the character's 'homebase' that is used to navigate the various levels), and other things. Players may share their creations. The core gameplay revolves around navigating the myriad number of levels with a set character, using power ups, jumping, swimming, swinging, grabbing, interacting with switches and non-player characters, defeating enemies, completing various main objectives, and finding collectibles, such as Collectabells, stickers, materials, objects, and gadgets.

LittleBigPlanet 3 introduces three brand new characters in addition to Sackboy, each with their own unique traits and abilities. OddSock is a four-legged, dog-like character who can run faster than Sackboy and can wall-jump. Swoop is a bird-like character who can fly freely around levels and can pick up other light objects. In addition to objects, Swoop can pick up other characters, with the exception of Big Toggle. Toggle is another character, who can transform between a large, heavy version and a small, light version. The larger version, called Big Toggle, is much heavier than Sackboy and can weigh down platforms or pressure plates. His miniature version is called Little Toggle, and can walk quickly on the surface of water, is very small and can fit through tight spaces. Level creators have the ability to allow players to play as more than one character during gameplay. In addition, Sackboy has a climbing ability which works on rope-based textures like vines and grates.

LittleBigPlanet 3 has several power-ups which, when equipped, give players additional abilities. Two such power-ups, the Pumpinator, blows and sucks air to move light objects, and the Blink Ball that when fired at a specific material, can teleport players. In addition to pre-made power-ups, creators are able to make their own using the new Power-up Creator. There are 70 tools in total, in addition to enhanced ones retained from the three previous titles, LittleBigPlanet, LittleBigPlanet 2 and LittleBigPlanet PS Vita.

All previous downloadable content packs from LittleBigPlanet and LittleBigPlanet 2 are fully backwards compatible, being transferable to LittleBigPlanet 3 on both the PlayStation 3 and PlayStation 4 versions. However, story progression logged from LittleBigPlanet 3's predecessors does not transfer onto the PlayStation 4 version of the game.

=== User-created levels ===
In LittleBigPlanet 3, players can play any levels created in LittleBigPlanet and LittleBigPlanet 2. The PlayStation 4 version of the game is rendered with an improved graphics engine and textures at 1080p resolution, while the PlayStation 3 version renders everything at 720p.Unlike previous games in the series which had three playable layers of depth, LittleBigPlanet 3 allows creators to use 16 layers.

Players are limited by the classic Thermometer rules by default, but players can choose to use the new "Dynamic Thermometer" streaming for levels. This makes the game unload objects as the player(s) get away from them and load objects that the player(s) get close to, and only loaded objects affect the Dynamic Thermometer. In addition, players can create Adventures, levels that contain up to 15 other levels that share progress through throughout all the sub-levels. However, on 1 January 2024, a server shutdown occurred, rendering the online community permanently unplayable.

== Plot ==
LittleBigPlanet 3 begins in a white void, as the Narrator (Stephen Fry) teaches controls on how to use the player character Sackboy. Midway through the opening, Newton, (Hugh Laurie) a bumbling yet well-meaning lightbulb person, interrupts the Narrator and uses one of his devices to create a wormhole. This wormhole sends Sackboy to another world called Bunkum, where he is greeted by Newton. Newton begins to tell a story on how his mother; Nana Pud is going to unleash three Titans that were sealed away long ago in a tea tin by Bunkum's heroes. The duo flies off in Newton's airship, landing on the doorstep of Nana Pud's home, Stitchem Manor. Newton stays behind, to "boil some eggs" as Sackboy infiltrates Stitchem Manor. Sackboy reaches the roof, defeating all of Nana Pud's security measures. Newton appears, revealing that it was his plan to unleash the Titans to make Bunkum more creative, and that Nana Pud was his mother, who warned him not to open the jar. Newton proceeds to open the lid, unwittingly getting possessed by the three Titans. As a result, Newton becomes corrupted by the Titans and flings Sackboy off the roof.

Nana Pud and Sackboy strike an alliance after Nana finds out Newton tricked Sackboy, to which Nana suggests that they reawaken the three heroes of Bunkum. First, they reach Bunkum's once thriving film industry, Manglewood Swamp, where the first hero is held. The Creator Curator, Marlon Random, helps Sackboy find the three Marbles needed to reawaken the guardian of Manglewood, Oddsock; who can run fast and climb up walls. Once the hero, Oddsock, is found, the possessed Newton unleashes the first Titan to try and stop her. She defeats the Titan, allowing the heroes move onto the next world. They reach The Ziggurat, home to the amnesiac Creator Curator Papal Mache. Once again, they reacquire the marbles, reawakening Toggle, a hero that can change size at will. Newton once again tries to slow down the heroes by unleashing the second Titan, whom Toggle manages to outrun and also gets defeated. Finally, the trio reach Bunkum Lagoon, a sky/sea themed corner of Bunkum that is hosted by the vain and somewhat insane Pinky Bufflooms. After reawakening Swoop, the final hero, Newton appears to be trapped and cornered by the four heroes, only to trap Sackboy, forcing the heroes to save him.

Newton is stopped from getting away with Sackboy, becoming furious and releases the third Titan inside his own fortress. This act relinquishes control back to his normal self, dropping his malevolent and rude behavior. A recovered Newton and the four of the heroes confront the final Titan. They blow up the third titan whilst destroying Newton's fortress. Nearly falling to their death, Newton, Sackboy, Toggle, Swoop, and Oddsock are saved by Newton's father, Captain Pud. The five heroes are flown back to Stitchem Manor, where Newton builds a new portal to send them back to LittleBigPlanet, thus ending the adventure.

=== Cast ===
LittleBigPlanet 3 is fully voice-acted, including cutscenes and gameplay, whereas previous games only featured voice acting during cutscenes. As in previous LittleBigPlanet games, Stephen Fry narrates. Other actors for the game include Hugh Laurie as Newton, the main antagonist of the game, Lewis MacLeod as Oleg and Captain Pud, Newton's father, Tara Strong as Coach Rock and Vera Oblonsky, Robbie Stevens as Larry Da Vinci, Peter Serafinowicz as Dr. Maxim, El Jeff, and Papal Mache, Lorelei King as Elena and Felica, John Guerrasio as Guard 1 and Guard 2, Martin T. Sherman as Gustavo, Glenn Wrage as Head Guard, Clare Corbett as Hildur, Lucy Newman-Williams as Irene, Nolan North as Marlon Random, Susan Brown as Nana Pud (Newton's mother), Alix Wilton Regan as Pinky Buflooms, Judith Sweeney as Victoria von Bathysphere, and Simon Greenall as Zom-Zom The Far-Out.

== Development ==
LittleBigPlanet 3 began development in 2011, shortly after the release of LittleBigPlanet 2. Most of the development was handled by Sumo Digital; however, series creator Media Molecule provided assistance, particularly during the project's early stages. Media Molecule chose not to develop LittleBigPlanet 3 because the company was busy with other projects, namely Tearaway and Dreams. Media Molecule also wanted to "step away" from the LittleBigPlanet series, but they said they will always be involved in the franchise. Additional developers included XDev Europe, Tarsier Studios, Supermassive Games, The Station, and Testology.

Damian Hosen, the game's design director, said of working with Media Molecule: "That was really valuable for us. [...] It was really cool to get a sense of what they were thinking, how the game came out like it did, what was their vision for it, what limitations did they put on themselves." Media Molecule stressed to Sumo Digital that the game's story must set a good example to what players can accomplish themselves in Create mode. Hosen said this concept helped "everything make sense [...] it all just clipped into place. [...] Those personal insights we got from them early on were invaluable in shaping how we made the rest of the game."

During the game's development process, around 20 prolific members of the LittleBigPlanet community were selected to work alongside Sony XDev to provide feedback and offer suggestions on the game's mechanics. Additionally, the game's introduction sequence – which is a combination of live action footage and visual effects – was produced by the UK studio Carbon Digital. Carbon Digital "worked closely" with Sumo Digital during the production of the video.

Early in the game's development, all of the playable characters were initially designed as silhouettes. The developers created "loads" of silhouettes and chose the best ones, which were then fully designed, and eventually became Oddsock, Swoop, and Toggle. (Sackboy, previously the only playable character, underwent minimal changes.) Oddsock and Swoop's designs were thought of early on and required no major redesigns. However, Toggle was initially just the 'big' character, and could not change into a smaller version of himself. Toggle was then revamped and the 'toggle' idea was implemented; without it, there weren't "enough combinations" or gameplay variety for the player. Pete Smith of SCE Worldwide Studios said the characters "needed to be game changers, they need to be fully customizable, they needed to feel like they belonged in the world, and they needed to have personality. I think the final three characters have really struck that balance." One character that was scrapped early on was 'Sackworm'; Smith said: "The Sackworm didn't last too long before he found himself on the cutting room floor."

LittleBigPlanet 3 was officially announced at the 2014 Electronic Entertainment Expo during Sony Computer Entertainment's press conference.

== Closure of online servers ==
On 12 March 2021, the LittleBigPlanet servers started experiencing DDoS attacks, and users reported that hackers were posting transphobic messages in the online mode. As a result, all of the online servers were temporarily shut down on 22 May 2021. On 13 September 2021, the PlayStation 4 online servers for LittleBigPlanet 3 were brought back up, but the PlayStation 3 servers were shut down permanently. On 8 January 2024, the PlayStation 4 servers were temporarily shut down due to a malicious game mod that caused users to be falsely banned from PlayStation Network. On 19 April 2024, the servers were permanently shut down due to ongoing technical issues. The loss of access to at least 10 million online user-created levels was harshly criticized by fans. On 31 October 2024, LittleBigPlanet 3 for the PlayStation 4 and the DLCs across all games were delisted from the PlayStation Store.

== Reception ==
Reception

Aggregate scores
Aggregator	Score
GameRankings	80.78%
Metacritic	79/100
OpenCritic	64% recommend

Review scores
Publication	Score
Destructoid	7.5/10
Eurogamer	7/10
GameSpot	7/10
GamesRadar+	4/5
GameTrailers	9.2/10
IGN	6.8/10
Joystiq	4.5/5
Polygon	7/10
Hardcore Gamer	3.5/5

LittleBigPlanet 3 received positive reviews from critics. It received an aggregated score of 80.78% on GameRankings based on 50 reviews and 79/100 on Metacritic based on 76 reviews. OpenCritic assessed that the game received strong approval, being recommended by 64% of critics.

Justin Clark from Joystiq gave the game a 4.5/5, praising the level design, change of pacing and scale in adventure mode, new characters and items, as well as the Hook Hat, a new feature in LittleBigPlanet 3. He also praised the user-friendly and satisfying creation mode and accessible tutorial. He stated that "LittleBigPlanet 3 is a foundation, upon which eager minds can start building even more inspiring content, and that process has been made more accessible than ever before."

Louise Blain from GamesRadar gave the game an 8/10, praising the inclusion of a tutorial, distinct characters and intuitive menu. However, she criticized the adventure mode for being "too short" and having "frustrating" checkpoints, as well as "slightly disappointing" pre-built content. She summarized the review by saying: "Beautiful, creative and filled with knitted joy, LittleBigPlanet 3 does however disappoint in its Adventure mode's comparatively sparse content. Nonetheless, it hands over an impressive array of exceptional design tools for budding creators."

Kevin Dunsmore from Hardcore Gamer gave the game a 3.5/5, saying "LittleBigPlanet 3 is an endearing and charming game that will work its way into your heart thanks to its presentation and new characters. The end-game possibilities are endless thanks to the co-op, level creator and millions of community driven stages imported from past titles, but it's held back due to Sumo Digital's unwillingness to fully flesh out their ideas."

Alexa Ray Corriea from GameSpot gave the game a 7/10. She praised the soundtrack, new characters introduced, gameplay changes when controlling different characters, freedom of movement and navigation, "challenging but rewarding" levels, as well as Popit Puzzles, a tutorial world introduced as its own mode that is hosted by Larry Da Vinci and Victoria von Bathysphere from LittleBigPlanet 2. However, she criticized the limited use of other characters in both Adventure Mode and co-op multiplayer, as well as multiple game-breaking bugs. She stated that "The push for creativity is limited in the way you play the campaign, but it's an overwhelming presence within creation mode, offering boundless ways to leave your own mark on Craftworld."

Polygon's Philip Kollar scored the game a 7 out of 10 and wrote: "Despite switching to a new developer, it has the big ideas and wide-eyed, arms-open demeanor of the series at its best. Yet it never totally commits, never goes all the way with its new concepts and characters. LittleBigPlanet 3's devoted fans will surely craft some excellent levels in the months to come, but mostly this feels like a proof of concept for a much better LittleBigPlanet 4."

Writing for Destructoid, Chris Carter scored the game a 7.5 out of 10. He said: "With all of the innovations LittleBigPlanet 3 brings with Toggle, Oddsock, and Swoop, it's a shame they aren't allowed to show off their stuff on a regular basis, because they are the best thing to happen to the series in years. It would be nice to see them return in a big way in a potential sequel, but for now hardcore LBP fans should have enough creation options to last them until that point."

Chris Schilling from Eurogamer scored the game a 7/10. He praised the game's new additions and improvements, as well as the create mode tutorials, but heavily criticized the presence of technical issues, saying he thought they dragged down the game. Schilling summed up the review by stating: "Held together by Sellotape rather than superglue, LittleBigPlanet 3 is in constant danger of falling apart."

Lucy O'Brien of IGN gave the game a mixed review. She scored it a 6.8/10, praising the design and visuals, but criticizing the "game-breaking" technical problems. O'Brien said: "LittleBigPlanet 3 is an enormous – and, at times, unruly – game. [Its] Adventure mode is beautifully designed, and new power-ups and character abilities switch up the usual bread-and-butter platforming gameplay, but it's let down by limited options for co-operative play and most significantly, a number of game-breaking bugs on the PlayStation 4. While a little daunting for newcomers, its supersized creation toolkit has enormous potential for creating deep and diverse play, and it's here where LittleBigPlanet 3 justifies its existence."

During the 18th Annual D.I.C.E. Awards, the Academy of Interactive Arts & Sciences awarded LittleBigPlanet 3 with "Family Game of the Year".
