= Rag Doll Kung Fu =

2005 fighting game

- Developers: Qi Creations (PC); Tarsier Studios (PS3); Another Place Productions (IOS); Another Place Productions (Android)
- Publishers: NA: Merscom; EU: Zoo Digital Publishing; WW: Sony Computer Entertainment (PS3); WW: Another Place Productions (IOS); WW: Another Place Productions (Android)
- Designer: Mark Healey
- Engine: Havok (software) (PS3)
- Platforms: Windows, PlayStation 3, IOS, Android (software)
- Release: WW: 12 October 2005 (PC); NA: 9 April 2009 (PS3); EU: 6 August 2009 (PS3); WW: 18 September 2013 (IOS); WW: 2 June 2014 (Android)
- Genre: Fighting
- Modes: Single-player, multiplayer

Rag Doll Kung Fu is a fighting video game developed by Qi Creations for Windows. created predominantly by artist Mark Healey, while working for Lionhead Studios, along with other Lionhead employees, such as David Smith and Alex Evans. Rag Doll Kung Fu is available from Valve's Steam content delivery platform. It is notable as the first third-party published game to be released on Steam. A remake developed by Tarsier Studios and published by Sony Computer Entertainment, titled Rag Doll Kung Fu: Fists of Plastic, was made available for download on the PlayStation Network for the PlayStation 3 on 9 April 2009. A iOS remake developed and published by Another Place Productions now called Tinka Games Limited, titled Dragon Finga, known as Rag Doll Kung Fu for IOS was made available for download on the App Store and the Play Store for the IOS on September 18, 2013 and Android on June 2, 2014.

== Gameplay ==
The game features string puppets that allow for complete control over their hands, arms, and the like. The game is played with the mouse. An online multiplayer feature has been added to the game as well.

== Development ==
The project was announced during an interview with Mark Healey by LHTimes. In the interview, Healey explained that the game was started after he and a few friends made a £50 kung fu film, and Healey felt a game should go along with it. Healey created a site dedicated to Rag Doll Kung Fu on the Lionhead Studios server. In late 2005 Healey, David Smith and Alex Evans left Lionhead Studios to form Media Molecule.

Rag Doll Kung Fu was nominated in the 2006 Develop awards for "New PC IP" and "Innovation". It has also been nominated in the GameShadow Innovation in Games Awards 2006
