= Dreams (video game) =

2020 video game by Media Molecule

- Developer: Media Molecule
- Publisher: Sony Interactive Entertainment
- Director: Mark Healey
- Designers: Mark Healey; John Beech; Christophe Villedieu; Steve Belcher
- Programmers: Alex Evans; David Smith
- Artists: Kareem Ettouney; Francis Pang; Jon Eckersley; Emilie Stabell; Maja-Lisa Kehlet
- Platform: PlayStation 4
- Release: 14 February 2020
- Genre: Game creation system
- Modes: Single-player, multiplayer

Dreams is a 2020 game creation system video game developed by Media Molecule and published by Sony Interactive Entertainment for the PlayStation 4. Players can create and play user-generated content in the forms of games, audiovisual experiences and game assets, which can be shared or remixed to be used in other players' creations.

On 11 April 2023, Media Molecule announced on their website that they would end live service support for Dreams in September 2023, in favour of an unannounced new project. Online server support will continue, as will bug fixing, in-game curation, official streams, and community engagement and promotion.

== Gameplay ==
In Dreams, players control an "imp", which is used to interact with the game's world and interface like a mouse cursor, create new items and characters, and manipulate objects by grabbing and pulling them. Players can move the imp with one of two control schemes: moving and rotating the DualShock 4 or PlayStation Move controllers, or using the left and right analog sticks. The imp is customizable, and can possess characters featured in a dream, allowing players to take direct control of these characters.

Dreams consists of six main sections: DreamSurfing, DreamShaping, Highlights, Profile, Community Jam, and Homespace. It also features a game made in Dreams by Media Molecule known as Art's Dream.

=== DreamSurfing ===
DreamSurfing can be thought of as the traditional "play" section where a player can browse "Dreams" that have been made and published to the "Dreamiverse" by other players, or as the game calls them, "Dreamers". These Dreams can be for example games to play, audiovisual experiences, and showcases of Elements such as sculptures and art to view and music to listen to. Many Dreams contain collectable "Prize Bubbles" which unlock Elements for players to use in their own creations, functioning similarly to Prize Bubbles in the LittleBigPlanet series.

DreamSurfing is divided into playlists of different kinds of Dreams, such as "Mm Picks", "New Trending Dreams", and "New Recommendations For You". At the top of the page there are banners with Dreams-related news and videos. Art's Dream can be found in this section. Players can give feedback on a Dream by giving it a "thumbs up" or leaving a comment. There is an option called "Autosurf" that presents the user with random Dreams to play within a playlist.

== DreamShaping ==
DreamShaping is the "create" section where players can create and publish games, audio-visual experiences and showcases known as "Dreams", as well as "Scenes", the connected environments and levels that make up Dreams, "Elements", the various assets that make up Scenes, and "Collections", sortable groups of Dreams, Scenes, Elements and other Collections.

=== Edit Mode ===
"Edit Mode" is the editor for scenes and elements. In Edit Mode, there are several modes available for creation. Each mode has many tools which can be used to manipulate Scenes and Elements. In Assembly Mode, users can quickly search the Dreamiverse for pre-made Elements and stamp them in their Scene. In Assembly Mode and Sound Mode, there are also many "Gadgets" available which can be used for logic, animation, lighting, sound, global settings, and more. Gadgets can be linked to other Gadgets and items such as sculptures using wires. In Dreams, Gadgets essentially form the gaming logic and game mechanics. Users can publish their creations online to the "Dreamiverse" for others to play or experience, and optionally they can make it re-mixable which allows other creators to use it in their creations, build upon it or tweak it. Cooperative multiplayer is featured in the game, allowing players to create and manipulate their creations together.

=== Community Jam ===
Community Jam is a themed contest, where creators create content based on a theme, for example "Spring Season" and "Pirates", and others vote on their favourites. The winners and runners-up get a badge on their creation's page. There is a new Community Jam with a new theme every few weeks.

== Plot ==
New players use the Dream Queen's Homespace before unlocking their own. The Dreamiverse is also inhabited by the Architect and Designer, two experts who teach the player about DreamShaping through in-game tutorials, and Imps, the player-controlled creatures who manipulate objects and possess characters.

=== Art's Dream ===
Media Molecule's creation Art's Dream "follows a former jazz musician Art as he dreams about his life, past and present, and realises he needs to make amends with his fellow bandmates. The journey takes him through a series of dream-like situations involving him and a whole cast of wonderful fantasy characters, such as D-Bug, a helpful little robot with an electric personality and Frances, a hammer wielding teddy bear."

== Development ==
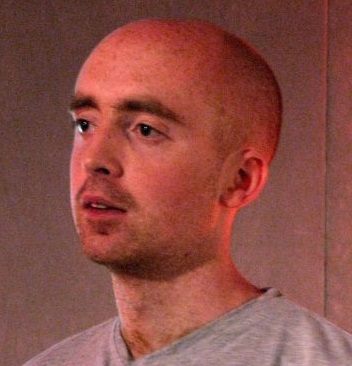
Alex Evans, one of the game's two technical directors

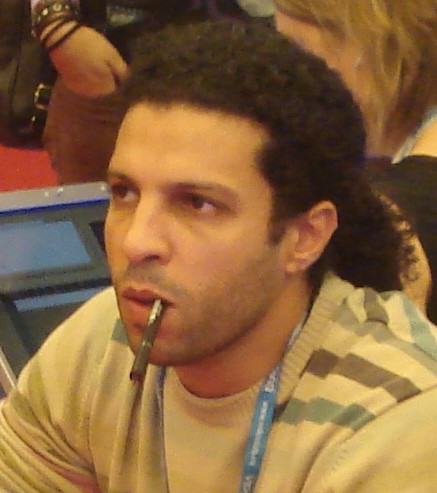
Kareem Ettouney, art director

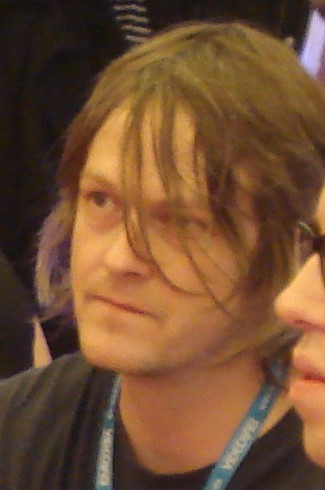
Mark Healey, creative director

Alex Evans and David Smith are the two technical directors; Mark Healey and Kareem Ettouney are creative director and art director respectively. Dreams uses a custom engine called BubbleBath that renders objects with particles called "Flecks" rather than polygons. The engine was named by the community.

In 2015, Evans said that the game would be "defined" by players instead of the developer. To help new players get into the game, a story campaign is featured to help players adapt to the gameplay mechanics. Studio director Siobhan Reddy added that the campaign is used to kickstart a community, and creation is the primary goal of the game.

As a result, they re-imagined Dreams into something as simple as sketching. This led the game to feature an impressionist art-style and implement the PlayStation Move motion-based controller. Many art styles and technical solutions were attempted before arriving at the final style and solution. The team used dreams as the game's setting, as they believed that it allows players to have their own styles, and inspires players to create something "artistic" and "incredible". Accessibility is a priority for Media Molecule with Dreams. The goal is to make Dreams more accessible so as many people with as many different requirements as possible are able to play.

In an October 2019 interview, Ettouney said they plan to give creators commercial ownership of their creations and publish them elsewhere. In March 2020, creators could apply to a beta evaluation program to sell their work "off PlayStation".

== Release and end of support ==
At Gamescom 2012, Media Molecule announced that they were working on two different projects, with one being Tearaway. Dreams was revealed at PlayStation Meeting 2013, with Evans showing a technical demo onstage, involving three players creating an in-game band. A teaser for the game was released in July 2014. The game was officially announced at Sony Interactive Entertainment's press conference at E3 2015. A beta for the game was originally set to be released in 2016, however, it was delayed to 2017 and then to 2018. The beta ran from 19 December 2018 until 4 February 2019. The game was made available via early access on 16 April 2019, a first for a Sony game, before being officially released on 14 February 2020. An update that added support for PlayStation VR was announced on 30 June 2020 and was released on 22 July 2020. In April 2023, Media Molecule announced that they would be ending support for Dreams in September, and limiting the size of future creations to maintain server stability. Online multiplayer was set to be released for the game sometime post-launch, but was announced to be cancelled following the game's end of support. The game's engine is called the Bubblebath Engine.

== Reception ==
Reception

Aggregate scores
Aggregator	Score
Metacritic	89/100
OpenCritic	96% recommend

Review scores
Publication	Score
4Players	82/100
Destructoid	9.5/10
Easy Allies	9.5/10
Edge	10/10
GameRevolution	4.5/5
GameSpot	9/10
Hardcore Gamer	4.5/5
IGN	9/10
Jeuxvideo.com	18/20
Push Square	10/10
Shacknews	9/10
The Guardian	4/5
USgamer	3.5/5
VideoGamer.com	8/10

Dreams received "generally favorable" reviews from critics, according to review aggregator website Metacritic. Fellow review aggregator OpenCritic assessed that the game received "mighty" approval, being recommended by 96% of critics. Vice compared it to Newgrounds, a website historically hosting Adobe Flash based media "oddities". Tortoise Media positioned it as one of the games at the forefront of a "growing trend towards the democratisation of game development, making it an accessible pursuit for the masses".

=== Awards ===
It won Most Original Game, Best PlayStation 4 Game and Best of Gamescom 2019 at Gamescom 2019. Dreams also won Gameplay Innovation of the Year from MCV/Develop.

Year	Award	Category	Result	Ref(s).
2018	Game Critics Awards	Best Original Game	Won	
2018	Game Critics Awards	Best Console Game	Nominated	
2018	Game Critics Awards	Best Family/Social Game	Nominated	
2018	2018 Golden Joystick Awards	Most Wanted Game	Nominated	
2019	2019 Golden Joystick Awards	PlayStation Game of the Year	Nominated	
2020	NAVGTR Awards	Engineering	Won	
2020	NAVGTR Awards	Game, Special Class	Won	
2020	The Game Awards 2020	Best VR/AR	Nominated	
2021	24th Annual D.I.C.E. Awards	Family Game of the Year	Nominated	
2021	24th Annual D.I.C.E. Awards	Outstanding Achievement in Audio Design	Nominated	
2021	24th Annual D.I.C.E. Awards	Outstanding Technical Achievement	Won	
2023	British Academy Games Awards	Evolving Game	Nominated	
