= LittleBigPlanet 2 =

2011 puzzle-platform game

- European box art
- Developer: Media Molecule
- Publisher: Sony Computer Entertainment
- Composers: Kenneth C M Young; Paul Thomson; Richard Jacques; Winifred Phillips; Baiyon; Keith Tenniswood; Daniel Pemberton
- Series: LittleBigPlanet
- Platform: PlayStation 3
- Release: NA: 18 January 2011; EU: 19 January 2011; AU: 20 January 2011; UK: 21 January 2011
- Genres: Puzzle-platform, sandbox
- Modes: Single-player, multiplayer

LittleBigPlanet 2 is a 2011 puzzle-platform video game developed by Media Molecule and published by Sony Computer Entertainment for the PlayStation 3. It is the second main installment in the LittleBigPlanet series and the third overall, and it is a direct sequel to LittleBigPlanet. Most of the more than 3 million levels created by users in the first game are playable and editable in LittleBigPlanet 2. Unlike its predecessor, which was marketed as a platform game, LittleBigPlanet 2 was marketed as a "platform for games", with more focus on its user-generated content. Support for PlayStation Move was added to the game through a software update in September 2011, allowing users to play the game using the PlayStation Move motion controller in conjunction with a Navigation Controller or gamepad. The story mode consists of six themed worlds, in which Sackboy helps out various Creator Curators across LittleBigPlanet before fighting the Negativitron, who has been destroying the worlds in Craftworld.

Similar to its predecessor, LittleBigPlanet 2 was met with critical acclaim, particularly for its refined content-creation features and artistic direction. The game's online functionality was officially discontinued after a lengthy period of outage on 13 September 2021, alongside services for LittleBigPlanet (2008), LittleBigPlanet PS Vita, and the PlayStation 3 version of LittleBigPlanet 3.

== Gameplay ==
Sackbots can be programmed to follow Sackboy.

While still retaining the three-layer, 2.5D nature of the original title, with the player controlling their Sackboy characters, players are not restricted solely to platforming levels, and can choose to create many types of levels including racing, puzzle and role-playing games. New animation recording options are available and players are able to create cut-scenes to go with their level design, manipulate the camera for both cut-scenes and gameplay, and record their own sound effects for use in the level. As well as including a wide selection of original and licensed music, the game also includes a robust music sequencer. Multiple levels can be linked together, so that finishing one level immediately takes the player to the next.

A new tool to assist in gameplay creation is the "Controlinator". This allows players to assign specific actions, such as button presses or Sixaxis motion control, to specific aspects of their gameplay design. Players are not restricted to using the Controlinator on level elements, however, and they may use it to direct the actions of the player's Sackboy character, allowing greater freedom of movement; Media Molecule made this design choice in response to the large number of homages to early platforming games, in which players had to "hide" and manipulate the Sackboy character in specific ways to replicate the style of gameplay. In addition to this tool, more gameplay items, similar to the Metal Gear Solid paintball gun released as downloadable content, are available including a grappling hook, the "Creatinator" - a hat which is worn by Sackboy and can be configured by the Creator to fire any object - and the "Grabinators" which allow Sackboy to pick up and throw grabable objects. Media Molecule updated the game regularly with new items.

Enemy creation has been improved. Players can create "Sackbots", which are non-player characters whose AI can be controlled by the level creator. Options include determining weak points on the Sackbots, as well as programming routines for the AI to follow. Sackbots can be customised using costumes and decorations in the same way that the player character is and the AI for may be copied and pasted between multiple Sackbots. Sackbots may also be controlled by the aforementioned controlinators.

All downloadable content from the first game is usable in LittleBigPlanet 2, as are most user-made levels. As of June 2013, almost 8 million levels have been uploaded and created for both the LittleBigPlanet games on PlayStation 3.

== Plot ==
=== Setting and characters ===
LittleBigPlanet 2 takes place in Craftworld, with each world created by their focus character, known collectively as the Creator Curators. Sackboy explores six different worlds: Da Vinci's Hideout, Victoria's Laboratory, The Factory Of A Better Tomorrow, Avalonia, Eve's Asylum and The Cosmos; each Creator Curator being Larry Da Vinci, Victoria Von Bathysphere, Clive Handforth, Avalon Centrifuge, Eve Silva Paragorica and Dr. Herbert Higginbotham respectively.

=== Story ===
Players continue Sackboy's journey after the events of the first game and the portable version are brought to an end. An inter-dimensional vacuum cleaner called the Negativitron (Jeremy Mayne) appears over the skies of LittleBigPlanet and begins to suck up its inhabitants, including Sackboy. Larry Da Vinci (Robbie Stevens), the leader of a semi-secret, semi-organised group known as "The Alliance", comes to Sackboy's rescue, saving him from the Negativitron. The Alliance is dedicated to stopping the Negativitron and its influence before it destroys Craftworld.

After Sackboy passes the tests in Larry's Hideout, he tells him that they must get to Victoria Von Bathysphere's (Judy Sweeney) Laboratory, since she has built a Sackbot army for the Alliance. However, the moment they get there, the Negativitron attacks and sucks up some of the lab and the Sackbots, mutating some of them into Meanies. Victoria, after escaping on her train, explains to the group that they need to get into the laboratory and shut down the machine making the Meanies. After shutting it down, the Negativitron makes the machine come alive into a spider-like creature that scales the wall of the laboratory. After destroying the machine, they find out that the Negativitron has taken the Sackbots to The Factory Of A Better Tomorrow. Upon arriving, Sackboy and Larry find the factory's owner Clive Handforth (Barry Meade) hiding in a can after the Negativitron took over the place. The Sackbots have become enslaved inside the factory, prompting the gang to rescue as many of them as they can. When trying to escape from the factory, one of Clive's guard-turkeys escapes and tries to stop them from leaving the factory with the Sackbots. After losing him, Sackboy, Larry, and Clive take the Sackbots to Avalonia for re-training.

In Avalonia, Avalon Centrifuge (Colin McFarlane) takes Sackboy on a training course to learn combat using his machines. Half-way through, though, the Negativitron attacks Avalonia and spreads Meanies throughout. After rescuing the Sackbots among the wreckage of the facility, they get loaded onto Huge Spaceship and prepare to leave Avalonia, but a Meanie warship attacks the ship. Even though Sackboy defeats the warship, Huge Spaceship crashes and is in need of repair, but the one creator can make it fly again is the great inventor Dr. Herbert Higginbotham (Ewan Bailey), who was infected by a Meanie during the Negativitron attack at Clive's factory. Avalon sends Sackboy and Clive to Eve's Asylum for the Mentally Alternative to liberate Higginbotham. When they arrive, it turns out that the asylum is under attack by Meanies. Eve Silva Paragorica (Jules de Jongh) asks them to help save the asylum and the patients within, then she will lead them to Higginbotham. After clearing out the Meanies in the asylum, they find Higginbotham. Eve proposes that they should get rid of the infection by shrinking Sackboy and sending him into Higginbotham's head. Even after clearing the infection, Higginbotham still appears to be insane. Upon their return to Avalonia, Higginbotham repairs Huge Spaceship, but as they are about to leave, Avalon decides to make a speech, and is abducted by the Negativitron.

While traveling through the Cosmos to find the Negativitron's core, they are attacked by the Negativitron who vacuums up parts of the ship, damaging it. Sackboy is sent to launch the escape pods to get the machines and the Sackbots out, and then escape. Huge Spaceship crashes on the Negativitron's core planet and is shut inside a forcefield. Larry Da Vinci sends out a message for Sackboy to help them, and after finding a White Sackbot Knight and rescuing him, he finds one of the Robobuns and uses it to rescue the Alliance. After defeating a giant robot that was holding Avalon hostage, they make their way to the Negativitron's core. The Negativitron shows up and launches his army of Meanies and guard-turkeys at them, but the Sackbot Army defends the Alliance members. The Negativitron tries to discourage them from fighting him by revealing it was created by all the negative aspects of the Craftworlders' personalities and that "If you destroy me, you destroy yourselves", but is defeated after a long and dangerous battle with Sackboy and the rest of the Alliance. The Alliance congratulates Sackboy for rescuing them and saving Craftworld, and they decide to return home.

== Community ==
LBP.me allowed people to search for levels from a web browser.

Shortly before the release of the game, a new community website was launched with the aim of enabling users to find and share in-game creations more easily. LBP.me allowed players to search and browse community-made levels from both LittleBigPlanet and LittleBigPlanet 2. Every level is allocated a unique URL which users can copy and share with other people. When signed into the website with their Sony Entertainment Network account, users may add levels to their 'Queue' enabling them to find the level quickly when they are in the game and connected to the game's servers. If the user is playing LittleBigPlanet 2 and is not currently in a level, a Play Now button becomes available on the website which sends a command back to the game to navigate instantly to the selected level.

Website owners may use a selection of widgets to add live data from the game to any website. A public API is also available but access to it is provided by the game's developers on a case-by-case basis.

On 17 February 2011, a community-made semi-official level pack named Hansel and Gretelbot was released. The series of levels, based loosely on the fairytale of Hansel and Gretel, was created by a team of community members who were approached by Media Molecule and asked to collaborate and attempt to make a set of levels that could match the quality of the game's story levels. The series, created using only the in-game tools, features original music, voice acting and prizes.

Since 23 November 2020, LBP.me has been offline. The LittleBigPlanet community manager Steven Isbell stated two days after the outage "We don't have any plans to shut down the LittleBigPlanet servers. LBP.me is just down for some general maintenance and updates." On 9 June 2022, 18 months after the outage began, Isbell finally announced on his personal Twitter account that "LBP.me will remain down for the foreseeable future.". The website remains offline as of 2025.

== Development ==
The game was hinted at by a Sony representative in March 2010, who stated that the game was in production and would support PlayStation Move controllers, and in April 2010 by musician Ochre who revealed one of his songs had been licensed for the game. It was formally revealed by video game magazine Game Informer in their June 2010 issue. On 8 May 2010 Media Molecule officially confirmed that they were developing LittleBigPlanet 2 on their Twitter account and hinted that the game would be formally revealed on Monday 10 May 2010. On 10 May 2010, the official website launched an announcement webpage and news article announcing the game with game details and an announcement trailer. The announcement was also made on the PlayStation Blog with a Q4 2010 release date. Numerous gaming websites reported about the game when an embargo lifted, including EuroGamer and IGN.

The game engine from the first game (left) has undergone major improvements for the sequel (right) including enhancements to the lighting and particle systems.

In October 2008, BBC reported before the original game was released that Media Molecule had already begun development of a sequel to LittleBigPlanet. The statement was later clarified in an interview with IGN, in which Siobhan Reddy of Media Molecule stated, "we see LittleBigPlanet as a platform... There will be a lot of additional content and it will vary in size and what it does. And we've already started that, yes." The "huge emotional investment" users have made in LittleBigPlanet, Alex Evans stated, is the reason he does not want to ship a traditional sequel. Because they don't want all of the user-generated content to be made obsolete, their focus was to "expand the game without partitioning the audience".

In July 2008, Media Molecule mentioned that should there ever be a LittleBigPlanet sequel that the game would feature backwards compatibility with the original game's user-created levels. In November 2009, level designer Danny Leaver elaborated that a traditional sequel could fragment the LBP community, which would be "the most counter-productive thing you could do".

On 23 March 2010, IGN reported LittleBigPlanet 2 was in development and would support the upcoming PlayStation Move controller. Sony later denied this report saying that future content for the original title would be compatible with PlayStation Move. Later on in May, along with the release of the trailer, Sony confirmed that LittleBigPlanet 2 would be compatible with Move. Keyboard and mouse support in Create mode was initially announced however it was later confirmed that this feature was not included in the game at launch.

Stephen Fry narrates the game as he did with the first one.

On 8 December 2010, Media Molecule posted an article entitled "The Music of LittleBigPlanet 2" on their official blog, in which they revealed the identities of the composers who had created original music tracks for the game. The list of seven composers included Paul Thomson, Richard Jacques, Winifred Phillips (with her music producer Winnie Waldron), Baiyon, Keith Tenniswood, Daniel Pemberton and Media Molecule's audio designer, Kenneth Young.

Media Molecule was asked in an IGN Q-and-A session how PlayStation Move will be added into the game in future updates, the company revealed that they are working on integrating motion controls into the Play, Create and Share modes of the game: "The exciting thing to do with Move is, we're working on a play-create-share pack. We're still in the R&D phase and working out what the features will be, but it will be announced in a little while and we’re really excited. In the same was as in [LittleBigPlanet], you have the Controlinator and you can remap the controls, you'll be able to do the same thing with Move. It'll also allow the community to make their own Move games and that's very cool." A software update allowing users to play the game using PlayStation Move was released in September 2011. A premium DLC pack titled Rise of the Cakeling was released shortly after and added new story levels and tools for creators enabling them to create PlayStation Move games.

=== Launch ===
The "Arcade" genre trailer was released just one day before the game's launch, showing several new gaming genres, including action, sports, and adventure genre. A behind the scenes video was also released, this video was shot as the game was about to go gold. The launch trailer was released on 21 January 2011, and is a tribute to the history of video gaming, as told from Sackboy's perspective. A TV ad was released, which showcased the new in-game features, and highlighted how diverse and global the LittleBigPlanet community is. A "Share" was also released, which showcased how to share the LittleBigPlanet 2 fun.

On 17 January 2011, Sony handed LittleBigPlanet 2 to selected gamers as they attempted to break the Guinness World Record of 50 hours of consecutive game play. The Guinness World Record of 50 hours of consecutive game play and four other records were broken after two days...accomplishing the record in less time than this was not possible.

Customers who had the game on week one were given the "1 week only" DLC (only available the first week), which consist of Launch Day "Space Suit" and "Rare" T-shirt. As a special offer, customers who showed that they have checked in on Sony Style Store Foursquare received an autographed cover from Media Molecule and Limited Edition DLC. The offer was only available on 18 and 19 January.

=== Major updates and downloadable content packs ===
On 15 February 2011, Media Molecule released software update 1.01. The first patch for the game, dubbed "Cupcake", addresses a number of technical issues which were affecting online play.

On 3 August 2011, Media Molecule released the Toy Story Level Kit, which is the first DLC pack to feature playable levels since the release of LittleBigPlanet 2 in January. The premium pack includes 9 Toy Story themed levels, 5 materials, 10 decorations, 6 objects, 149 stickers and the Toy Story Alien Costume, which had previously only been available as a bonus for preordering LittleBigPlanet 2 from Best Buy, and bundled in the LittleBigPlanet 2 Collector's Edition. The pack also includes music composed by Winifred Phillips and produced by Winnie Waldron. The music includes three new Toy Story-themed music tracks, one of which is an interactive track. In a review of the music on Gamertell.com, assistant editor Jeremy Hill said "Even without [LittleBigPlanet 2] backing it up, these songs can stand on their own", and Simon Smith of Higher Plain Music described the musical score as "Utterly charming and disarming it'll have you beaming in no time."

On 7 September 2011, software update 1.06 was released. This patch added support for the PlayStation Move motion controller. A downloadable content pack released the following week includes new story levels and creation tools, enabling users to create their own Move-based games and levels.

== Music ==
Like previous games, the player is able to collect music that can be used in user-created levels. LittleBigPlanet 2 contains four types of music: linear, interactive, cinematic, and sequenced.

== Marketing and release ==
LittleBigPlanet 2 was originally scheduled for release in November 2010, but was delayed until January 2011. The game was released in North America on 18 January 2011 in mainland Europe on 19 January 2011, Australian and New Zealand on 20 January 2011 and in the UK and Ireland on 21 January 2011. On 21 December 2010 SCEA PR Manager, Eric Levine, confirmed that the game has "gone gold", meaning the game was 100% finished and had been signed off by SCE QA.

The LittleBigPlanet 2 Story Mode Demo was made available as a free download from the PlayStation Store on 21 December 2010 in North America and on 22 December 2010 in Europe. The demo includes 3 levels from the game's story mode. Each of the levels in the demo demonstrates one of LittleBigPlanet 2's new features: The Grapple Hook in the "Tower of Whoop" level, the Controlinator in "Avalon’s Advanced Armaments Academy" and the Creatinator in the "Rocket Funland" mini-game.

The auto manufacturer Toyota offered free sponsored content when LittleBigPlanet 2 launched, including a free XMB theme and a special Prius-themed level. The downloadable add-on included collectible items which players could use to build their own creations to win "some very cool prizes."

On 19 January 2011, Sony made a Home Square makeover. Cardboard and carpet transformed the familiar Home Square into an environment where Sackboy will feel right at home, in the European version of the PlayStation 3's online community-based service, PlayStation Home.

7-Eleven offered exclusive downloadable content for LittleBigPlanet 2 in exchange for Slurpee purchases in stores in the U.S. at the end of January 2011. 7-Eleven was also featuring LittleBigPlanet 2 themed Slurpee cups. Each Slurpee cup bear a unique code, allowing a download for LittleBigPlanet 2 content (and other Slurpee rewards), such as a dynamic theme for the PlayStation 3 system, the "Slurpee Sticker Pack", the Strategy Guide, the Sackboy Backpack for PlayStation Home, several ringtone, a behind the scene video, and a creator video. The promotion ran until the end of March 2011. A Sackboy easter egg was also spotted in Uncharted 3: Drake's Deception.

=== Pre-order bonuses ===
There were several pre-order offers through several retail outlets. Each pre-order consists of four costumes from the "Even More Animals" pack and up to two "special" costumes from Disney, Pixar and Insomniac Games. Which of the "special" costumes the player received depended upon where they pre-ordered the game. The costumes on offer were Ratchet & Clank costumes, Toy Story Alien costume, a Tron suit or The Muppets' The Great Gonzo costume.

=== Retail editions ===
Alongside the standard edition of the game, there are several other versions of the game exclusive to certain countries and/or regions around the world. All of the special edition versions of the game are sold in limited quantities and contain a copy of the game as standard or in special packaging.

SCEA marketing manager, Mark Valledor, announced a Collector's Edition for North America in July 2010. The Collector's Edition for North America includes a copy of the game, a 7-inch Sackboy plushie, five PlayStation Network avatars, LittleBigPlanet 2 bookends and 11 in-game costumes.

SCEE product manager, Alex Pavey, told the readers of the PlayStation Blog in November 2010 that there will also be a Collector's Edition released in Europe which different from the North American version. The Collector's Edition for Europe comes with different box art, the Collector's Edition copy of the game comes in SteelBook case packaging. It also includes seven in-game costumes and five PSN avatars. There are four other in-game costumes: Jak and Daxter and Ratchet & Clank. These will be available through retailer-specific pre-order incentives, but details of these have not yet been announced. The LittleBigPlanet 2 Collector's Edition was available in different ways across Europe and the other PAL countries.

The Collector's Edition for Australia is very similar to the Collector's Edition for Europe. It comes with the SteelBook packaging, eleven downloadable Sackboy costumes and five PSN Avatars. It also included a 7-inch Sackboy plushie as a pre-order bonus.

In the UK, a console bundle was available which consists of a 320GB PlayStation 3 console, a DualShock 3 controller and a copy of the standard edition of the game.

Exclusive for North America, a Special Edition was released in November 2011. This edition includes the standard edition of the game, PlayStation Move support, "Move Pack: Rise of the Cakeling" (5 new levels and 7 mini-levels), "Disney/Pixar Toy Story Level" and "Costume" packs, and "Pets Costumes" (the "Dogs", "Cats", and "Even More Animals Costume" packs). The Special Edition was also included as a pack-in game with the 2011 holiday 160GB PS3 system bundles in North America.

An Extras Edition was originally set to be released in February 2013 but was delayed until March 2013 for Europe. This edition features the original game and a range of bonus content previously released as DLC. Bonus content consists of such as the "Cross-Controller Pack", "Move Pack: Rise of the Cakeling", and "The Muppets Premium Level Kit". The edition also includes plenty of costumes as "The Muppets Costume Pack 1", "Weekend Pursuits Costume Pack", "Deep Sea Adventures Costume Pack", "Sports Costume Pack", "Dogs Costume Pack", and the "Cats Costume Pack".

== Reception ==
Reception

Aggregate scores
Aggregator	Score
GameRankings	92.04%
Metacritic	91/100

Review scores
Publication	Score
Computer and Video Games	9.4/10
Eurogamer	9/10
Famitsu	86
GamesTM	10/10
IGN	9.0/10
Joystiq	5/5
PlayStation Official Magazine – UK	10/10
PlayStation Universe	9.0/10
Paste	9.4/10

Awards
Publication	Award
BAFTA	Family (2012); Game Innovation (2012)
AIAS	Family Game of the Year (2012)

LittleBigPlanet 2 has received universal acclaim from critics. PlayStation Official Magazine (UK) gave LittleBigPlanet 2 a perfect 10/10 score. They praised the redesigned creation tools as "simple-to-grasp, all with huge potential" and said the game overall was "hugely improved" over the original. IGN's Greg Miller scored the game 9.0/10, complimenting the amount of variety found in LittleBigPlanet 2's story mode. He went on to commend the new creative tools, stating that the "focus of creating games in the game really shines through", referring to the new tool-set as "mindboggling deep". Miller did however reserve some criticism for some of the same "frustrations" from the first game which are still present in the sequel, such as "floaty" jump controls.

Eurogamer scored the game 9/10 commenting on its "achingly pretty" visuals and looking optimistically on the game's community, saying "there is little doubt that LBP2's online servers will play host to some extraordinary content". PlayStation Universe's Adam Dolge states that "the soundtrack is simply wonderful, while the art style is moody with a vaudevillian flair." Paste Magazine's Kirk Hamilton singled out the game's backward compatibility with user-created levels from the first LittleBigPlanet, and also praised the game's "musical soul", both in its "eclectic collections of licensed music" and in its "outstanding original score."

=== Sales ===
In the UK, LittleBigPlanet 2 debuted at number one on the UK All Formats chart, then fell to number two in its second week of sales. According to ChartTrack, the original LittleBigPlanet sold 95 more copies than LittleBigPlanet 2 managed at it debut week. LittleBigPlanet 2 remained the UK's biggest-selling PS3 game for two weeks in a row. In Japan the game debuted at number five, selling 24,648 copies and in North America it topped the North American software sales in its debut week. LittleBigPlanet 2 was ranked number four on NPD's sales charts for January 2011, selling over 353,000 units in its first couple of weeks. On Black Friday in November 2011, LittleBigPlanet 2 sold over 400,000 copies. According to SCE, LittleBigPlanet 2 was one of the most popular games on PlayStation 3 in 2011.

=== Awards ===
LittleBigPlanet 2 was nominated for a 2011 Golden Joystick Award in the 'Best Action/Adventure' category. The game received a nomination as "Best PS3 Game" in the 2011 Spike Video Game Awards, losing to another PS3 game, Uncharted 3: Drake's Deception.

The "Victoria's Lab" music track from LittleBigPlanet 2 was also nominated for a 2011 Hollywood Music in Media Award in the 'Best Song in a Video Game' category.

Kotaku named the score of LittleBigPlanet 2 as one of the best video game soundtracks of the year. In the article The Best Game Music of 2011: LittleBigPlanet 2, features editor Kirk Hamilton praised both the collection of licensed tracks and the original score, singling out the music of composer Winifred Phillips (and particularly her track "Victoria's Lab") as his favorite original music of the game, and the "Infotain Me" licensed track from electronic musician Ochre as capturing "the essence of the game".

LittleBigPlanet 2 was nominated for the 10th Annual Game Audio Network Guild Awards in the categories of 'Best Use of Licensed Music' and 'Best Original Vocal - Pop' for "Victoria's Lab" by Winifred Phillips.

LittleBigPlanet 2 was nominated for the 2011 Game Developers Choice Awards in the category of 'Best Audio', which recognizes the overall excellence of audio in a game - including musical composition, orchestration, sound design, sound effects, etc.

During the 15th Annual Interactive Achievement Awards, LittleBigPlanet 2 received nominations in the categories of 'Outstanding Achievement in Original Music Composition', 'Outstanding Achievement in Online Gameplay', and ultimately won 'Family Game of the Year'.

At the 2011 BAFTA Video Games Awards, LittleBigPlanet 2 won in the Family and Best Innovation categories.

== Sackboy's Prehistoric Moves ==
LittleBigPlanet: Sackboy's Prehistoric Moves
- Logo
- Developers: Supermassive Games; XDev
- Publisher: Sony Computer Entertainment Europe
- Series: LittleBigPlanet
- Platform: PlayStation 3
- Release: 14 December 2010: PlayStation Plus; NA: 7 December 2010; EU: 8 December 2010 PlayStation Store; NA: 14 December 2010; EU: 15 December 2010 On LittleBigPlanet 2 Blu-ray disc; NA: 18 January 2011; EU: 19 January 2011; PAL: 19 January 2011
- Genres: Platformer, multi-genre
- Mode: Multiplayer

LittleBigPlanet Sackboy's Prehistoric Moves is a LittleBigPlanet spin-off developed by Supermassive Games and SCE Worldwide Studios' XDev team, which can be played with two to five players and requires a PlayStation Move controller and a PlayStation Eye Camera. One player uses the PlayStation Move motion controller as a pointing device to manipulate the environment by triggering switches and moving platforms, while the others play using a gamepad to control Sackboy in the usual way. Although billed as a PlayStation Network game, Sackboy's Prehistoric Moves' narrator introduces it as a "demo". It features ten prehistoric-themed levels and was released on the PlayStation Store in North America on 7 December 2010, and in Europe on 8 December 2010 for PlayStation Plus subscribers. It was made available to other users in North America on 14 December 2010 and in Europe on 15 December 2010. The game was also bundled with LittleBigPlanet 2 when it was released in January 2011.

=== Reception ===
Due to the unconventional release of the game, Sackboy's Prehistoric Moves has not been widely reviewed as a standalone product. Greg Miller from IGN scored the game 6.5/10, describing it as more of a tech demo of the PlayStation Move's functionality, rather than a fully-fledged game. He also criticised the game's lack of lasting appeal as there are no prizes or costumes to collect. Miller did however say "If you have a bud who is as into LittleBigPlanet as you are, you're going to have fun" and that the game could act as a good demonstration piece for the PlayStation Move. Eurogamer scored the game 7/10 and said that "there's not a great deal of substance" and criticised the use of the LittleBigPlanet engine instead of LittleBigPlanet 2's enhanced features, but tempered it by saying "when you've got a game that already looks as lovely as this one does, I'm sure you'll be able to live with that." GamesRadar also criticised the game's length; "Sackboy's Prehistoric Moves is a very capable game; there's just not that much "game" to go around", the reviewer was also puzzled about the use of the original LittleBigPlanet engine in a game released next to the enhanced LittleBigPlanet 2 and summed up by saying "Overall, Sackboy's Prehistoric Moves is a strange beast. It's too good to be a demo, too short to be a game, too outdated to be a preview and imbued with too much care and character to be passed off as a PS Move advergame", and scored the game as 7/10.

== Applications in education ==
Media Molecule worked in conjunction with ConnectED, a branch of Sony Computer Entertainment focused on the education sector, to develop a LittleBigPlanet 2 teachers' kit for use in the classroom. The pack will feature levels themed around National Curriculum subjects including physics, maths, science, art and history and is designed to help engage students in these subjects.
