= Mark Healey =

British video game developer

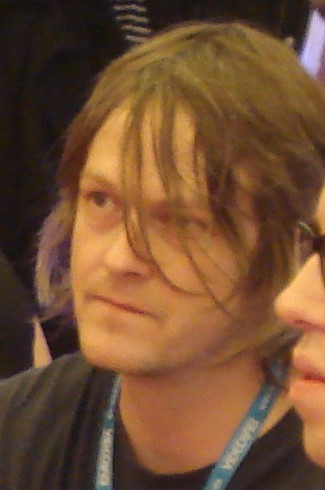
- Mark Healey playing a demonstration of LittleBigPlanet in 2007
- Occupation: Video game developer
- Known for: Dungeon Keeper; Black & White; Ragdoll Kung Fu; LittleBigPlanet (2008 video game); LittleBigPlanet 2 Dreams

Mark Healey is a British video game developer from Ipswich, Suffolk. He co-founded Media Molecule and was creative director of LittleBigPlanet, LittleBigPlanet 2 and Dreams.

== Career ==
Healey started his career making games for the Commodore 64 home computer. His first published game was KGB Super Spy for Codemasters, which led to developing the educational Fun School series of games for Europress Software.

Healey joined Bullfrog Productions to work with Peter Molyneux on titles such as Magic Carpet and Dungeon Keeper. When Molyneux left Bullfrog to form Lionhead Studios, Healey joined him, and worked as a senior artist on Black & White and Fable. Whilst still at Lionhead, he developed Rag Doll Kung Fu independently in his spare time, which was the first third party game to be distributed over Steam (Valve's online distribution system).

In 2006, he co-founded Media Molecule with Kareem Ettouney, David Smith, and Alex Evans. At the company, Healey served as the creative director for LittleBigPlanet, LittleBigPlanet 2 and Dreams.

In April 2023, Healey announced that he would be leaving Media Molecule. He joined 22cans as art director for the title Masters of Albion.
