= Phil Harrison =

British businessman

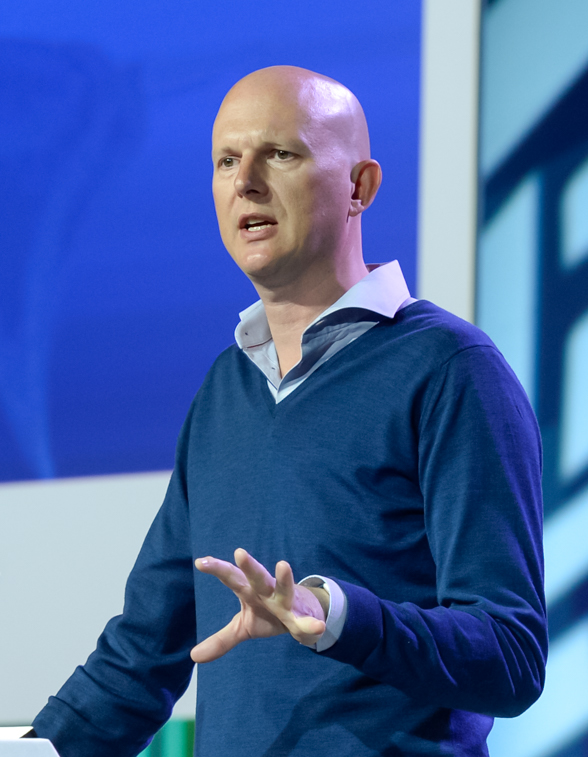
- Harrison at the 2016 Game Developers Conference
- Occupations: Video gaming and corporate executive
- Known for: Leading gaming companies or consoles

Phil Harrison is a British video gaming and corporate executive. He was a member of the original PlayStation team at Sony Computer Entertainment before and after its launch, and would hold positions at its European, American and global divisions until 2008. In 2012, he joined Microsoft and served as European corporate vice president of Xbox until 2015. Harrison joined Google in 2018, leading its Stadia gaming division; he left the company following the discontinuation of the service in 2023.

== Background ==
Harrison became interested at a young age when gifted a Commodore 64 computer. His first work in computers was a side job at the age of 14, doing a graphical work on a British computer called Oric-1.

== Career ==
From 1989 to 1992, Harrison served as head of development for Mindscape International, and prior to that as a game designer and graphic artist in the UK.

=== Sony ===
After joining Sony in 1992, Harrison held executive management positions in Europe and North America – where he served as vice president, 3rd Party Relations and Research and Development for Sony Computer Entertainment America from 1996 to 2000. He was a core member of the teams that successfully launched the first three PlayStation consoles and software, that have helped expand the market for computer entertainment worldwide. A 1995 article in Next Generation called Harrison "Sony Computer Entertainment's European PlayStation primary evangelist." At E3 in May 2005, he showcased the first public real-time demonstrations of PlayStation 3 development hardware.

In September 2005, Sony Computer Entertainment unified its regional product development operations under a global structure, Sony Computer Entertainment Worldwide Studios (SCE WWS), and appointed Harrison to serve as President of the new organization. Working closely with Sony's studios in Japan, Europe and North America, Harrison was responsible for setting the global product strategy and managing development operations of 13 studios in Japan, UK (including Evolution Studios), the Netherlands (Guerrilla Games) and the USA.

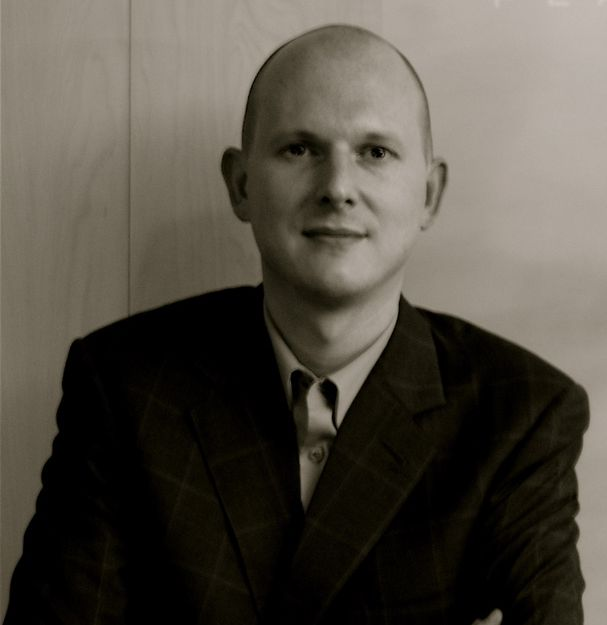
Harrison at E3 in 2006

On 25 February 2008, Sony announced Harrison's resignation from the company effective 29 February.

=== Infogrames / Atari ===
On 3 March 2008, Infogrames Entertainment SA announced Phil Harrison as their new President and Directeur Général Délégué. Later that year he gave interviews in which he predicted that single-player games were to become increasingly rare as consumers wanted "network connectivity" and "community". On 29 May 2009, it was announced that Harrison had become the non-executive director of Atari, following the company's full takeover of US-based Atari, Inc., and the renaming of Infogrames Entertainment SA to Atari.

On 19 April 2010, Atari announced Phil Harrison had resigned from the company's Board of Directors.

=== Gaikai ===
On 17 May 2010, it was announced that Phil Harrison has joined the advisory board at David Perry's cloud gaming service known as Gaikai.

=== Microsoft ===
On 13 March 2012, it was announced that Phil Harrison had joined the Interactive Entertainment Team at Microsoft. He headed the European operations for Xbox. On 17 April 2015, it was announced that Phil Harrison had left Microsoft Game Studios.

=== Google ===
On 22 January 2018, it was announced that Phil Harrison had joined Google as a vice president and general manager of the unit that would develop the cloud gaming platform Google Stadia, introduced in 2019. On 1 February 2021, Phil Harrison announced that Google would shut down its internal game development studio. On 29 September 2022, Phil Harrison announced that Google would shut down Stadia entirely by 18 January 2023. Harrison reportedly left Google that January, around the time of Stadia's shutdown.
