= Kevin Butler (character) =

Character

- PlayStation mascot character
- Kevin Butler as he appears in "It Only Does 256 Players/Relentless War"
- First appearance: Dustin vs. PlayStation
- Created by: Sony Computer Entertainment America
- Portrayed by: Jerry Lambert

In-universe information
- Occupation: Vice President of various departments of PlayStation

Kevin Butler (portrayed by Jerry Lambert) was a marketing character used by Sony Computer Entertainment America as part of their It Only Does Everything (2009–11) and Long Live Play (2011) advertising campaigns for the PlayStation 3 in North America. He starred as the Vice President of various fictitious departments within the PlayStation division of Sony, responding to "Dear PlayStation" queries. Due to the positive reception to the commercials, Sony extended them throughout the remainder of 2010 as well as into 2011. The character was created by Deutsch LA, the advertising agency responsible for the campaign. Deutsch/LA also managed Kevin Butler's Twitter account and wrote his E3 2010 speech. Creative Circus graduates Will Lindberg and Mark Adler were responsible for creating the "Hall of Play" Facebook application to induct PlayStation gamers into the Hall of Play by Kevin Butler.

== Appearances ==
Kevin Butler first appeared in a 2009 ad for MLB 09: The Show called "Dustin vs. PlayStation" where he, the "Director of Game Accuracy", was debating the in-game abilities of Dustin Pedroia, 2008 AL MVP. He then appeared in another ad for the game called "Joe the Fan" discussing Pedroia's abilities with a fan named Joe Biancanellio, a Baseball Connoisseur. These are the only two commercials not part of the It Only Does Everything campaign and featured the original model PS3 due to these two commercials being made before the slim model was released. The original PS3 model can also be seen in Kevin Butler's "Artist Spotlight" for ModNation Racers.

The first commercial in the It Only Does Everything campaign began with the price drop and rebranding of the PS3 where the "Director of Rumor Confirmation", Kevin Butler, responded to a call in regards to a rumor about the PS3 price drop. Kevin Butler then appeared in many additional commercials. On June 15, 2010, he made a live appearance at Sony's E3 press conference promoting the PlayStation Move and gaming in general. He revealed on his Twitter account that he had a college degree in M.B.A., Master of Being Awesome. In the "What Are You Waiting For?" commercial, it was shown that Kevin Butler had his own RV called "The PlayStation VP-ehicle" and he put the PlayStation Move to the ultimate test by spending 90 days in the Maguire family's house.

For the 2009 holiday season, Kevin Butler teamed up with Best Buy employee Nick DeVita from New York to promote a PS3 Best Buy bundle. They also teamed up to promote PS3 Best Buy bundles for the consequent holiday seasons in 2010 and 2011.

On August 26, 2011, Butler told his Twitter followers "KB's off to be PRESIDENT of my uncle's new upstart company" which was later revealed to be fictional "Economy Flooring". This led to the launch of a new marketing campaign, Long Live Play, to succeed the It Only Does Everything marketing campaign. The first commercial in the Long Live Play campaign began with Butler as President, Economic Flooring, until he receives a call from Jack Tretton, President of Sony Computer Entertainment America, to return to PlayStation.

On October 27, 2011 (until Thanksgiving 2011), as part of the Long Live Play campaign, Kevin Butler opened the "Hall of Play" inducting PlayStation gamers into the Hall of Play through Facebook. As part of a DLC pack for LittleBigPlanet Karting, players who pre-ordered the game received a Kevin Butler Sackboy Costume and Executive Golf Cart.

=== Titles ===
He had a different title in each commercial (except the two MLB 11: The Show commercials, the Resistance 3 and Uncharted 3: Drake's Deception commercials), such as "Director of Rumor Confirmation" or "VP of First Person Shooter Relations". In his YouTube Channel, he noted that he was "PlayStation VP of... Lots of Stuff." In the PlayStation Move commercials, instead of responding to "Dear PlayStation" queries, Kevin Butler had "Dear World" queries about motion gaming. In the "EyePet, There's a New Pet in Town" commercial, he had a "Dear Puppies" query for puppies. In the video announcing the launch of video streaming on PlayStation 3 in Canada, he referred to Canadians as "Canadese".

There have also been some unofficial titles given to him. At E3 2010, for example, when Gabe Newell came out to present Portal 2 on the PlayStation 3, Newell made a joke stating that Kevin Butler had introduced himself backstage as the "VP of Sharpening Things" which is why Newell seemed nervous.

=== Hall of Play ===
The Hall of Play was a fictional Hall of Fame that honored PlayStation gamers as part of Sony's Long Live Play campaign. The Hall of Play opened on October 27, 2011 with a Kevin Butler version of PlayStation's "To Michael" commercial (Kevin Butler was praised and his picture was shown at the end instead of Michael's). Kevin Butler began inducting various gamers every weekday into the Hall of Play on November 1, 2011 until Thanksgiving (November 24, 2011). Although Kevin Butler no longer personally inducted gamers after November 24, 2011 with their own induction video, PlayStation gamers could still be inducted by Butler through PlayStation's Facebook page app where Kevin Butler walks players through the Hall of Play and has players recite the Hall of Play oath. Players were then treated to their own version of the "To Michael" commercial, with their name being praised and a picture of themselves in the place of Michael's picture (the app has since been taken down).

== Controversies ==
In one of his first commercials, in response to a rumor monger questioning a then-confirmed price drop for the PlayStation 3, he says, "You can't believe everything you read on the Internet. Otherwise, I'd be a Nigerian millionaire by now." This prompted Nigeria's Minister of Information and Communication, Professor Dora Akunyili, to demand an apology from Sony, calling the commercial an "unwarranted attack on the reputation and image of the country." In response, Sony promptly issued an apology to the Nigerian government and immediately removed the commercial from the air. A few days later, Sony replaced the commercial with an edited version, replacing the original line with, "You can't believe everything you read on the Internet. That's how World War I got started."

In July 2010, New Zealand television station TV3 ran an advertisement for "Something big on Monday nights". Gaming website ButtonMasher accused TV3 of directly ripping off the "Mon-Tage, It Only Does All-Nighters/Blu-ray Games" commercial. Kevin Butler replied via Twitter: "Dear TV3: You could have at least put my photo on top of the amp. Sheesh."

In January, 2011, Sony sued George Hotz and others, in part for publishing PS3's private keys (which allows users to modify the system to run customized or unofficial software). On 9 February 2011, a post was published on Kevin Butler's Twitter account containing an earlier dongle key. The post was made in reply to another user who tweeted the code to @TheKevinButler in an attempt to mock Sony's threat that they'd prosecute anyone who "posts the PlayStation 3 private key" Kevin Butler replied, appearing to mistake the code for a series of coordinates in the game Battleship, joking "Lemme guess... you sank my Battleship?" and copying the original message in his reply. The post was later deleted from the @TheKevinButler Twitter account.

On September 11, 2012, Sony sued Lambert, alleging trademark infringement, due to his appearance in a Bridgestone commercial that featured the Wii as part of a sales promotion. They settled four months later, with Lambert agreeing not to appear in video game advertisements for two years.

== Reception ==
The string of commercials starring Kevin Butler was met with positive acclaim due to its humorous and lively tone. Gaming site Kotaku commented on the first two commercials that were released, "What we didn't mention is how funny they are." Sony Computer Entertainment America Senior Vice President Peter Dille said that the commercials had "been tremendously successful. Consumers love it. It's great to hear people like you guys love it. And the results are really in the sales because it's really been flying since this coincided in September with the launch of the new PS3." Engadget also loved the commercials saying, "We have to hand it to Sony, they've followed up nicely on their "worst kept secret" trade show jokes with an ad campaign that is fittingly self-aware". Destructoid praised the commercials, saying that they were much better than Sony's previous White Room series of ads, which was met with mostly negative reception, with most calling it "creepy." When Butler appeared at E3 2010, he was met with large praise from the audience.

Peter Dille, the real VP of Marketing for Sony Computer Entertainment America, said that the company had received requests for interviews with Butler from people who did not realize that he was a fictional character.

NPR named a sandwich in his honor. The sandwich, a double bacon cheeseburger sandwiched in between two Monte Cristos was based on a remark that was made by the fictional executive.

His catchphrase "Well played, Mauer", from a series of commercials with 2009 AL MVP Joe Mauer, is widely quoted among baseball fans, and has been the subject of parodies and T-shirts. The clip was regularly played on the main video board at Target Field whenever Mauer made a winning play, such as a hit or a home run.

== See also ==
- Marcus Rivers
- Lambert & Butler
