= LittleBigPlanet (2008 video game) =

2008 video game

- PAL box art showing "Sackpeople" characters and the game's sticker feature
- Developer: Media Molecule
- Publisher: Sony Computer Entertainment
- Designers: Mark Healey; David Smith
- Composers: Kenneth C M Young; Mat Clark; Daniel Pemberton
- Series: LittleBigPlanet
- Platform: PlayStation 3
- Release: NA: 27 October 2008; EU: 5 November 2008; AU: 7 November 2008
- Genres: Platform, sandbox
- Modes: Single-player, multiplayer

LittleBigPlanet is a 2008 platform video game developed by Media Molecule and published by Sony Computer Entertainment for the PlayStation 3. In LittleBigPlanet, the player controls Sackboy, a customizable ragged doll as they explore the titular realm. The game is primarily centered around content creation, with examples including a level editor and the Popit, a portable menu used for accessing creation tools. Prior to 12 March 2021, the player could publish levels online and play others' published levels. The story mode consists of eight themed areas, in which Sackboy helps out various Creator Curators across LittleBigPlanet before fighting the Collector, who has been kidnapping and stealing creations.

Media Molecule was formed by four former Lionhead Studios employees after the release of Rag Doll Kung Fu in 2005. Wanting to create a video game centered around content creation, they pitched a prototype called Craftworld to Sony Computer Entertainment Worldwide Studios president Phil Harrison, who lauded the concept and agreed to fund the project. LittleBigPlanet was first announced by Harrison at Game Developers Conference 2007, followed by a marketing campaign, beta testing, and consumer and press anticipation. After brief delay to remove controversial lyrics from an in-game licensed song, LittleBigPlanet released worldwide between October and November 2008.

LittleBigPlanet was met with critical acclaim, with praise for its creative gameplay and community-driven aspects. LittleBigPlanet won several Game of the Year awards and additional awards for its graphics, music, and gameplay innovation. Retrospectively, some publications have ranked it among the greatest video games of all time. After dwindling sales in 2008, LittleBigPlanet became commercially successful, reaching 4.5 million copies. LittleBigPlanet was followed by two sequels and several spin-offs.

== Gameplay ==
A screenshot from the Savannah level "Swinging Safari". Each level is designed around the basic control scheme of Sackboy. On top of the giraffe are score bubbles, and the brown circle on the right is an unactivated checkpoint.

LittleBigPlanet is a physics-based platform game with an emphasis on content creation. The player character is Sackboy, a brown, customisable ragdoll. Sackboy can run, jump, grab objects made out of certain material, shift between the three layers of the game's 2.5D plane, and access the Popit, a menu where the player can use customisation tools, stickers, and objects. There are two game modes, each of which take the form of a celestial body: LittleBigPlanet, where the player can play levels, and MyMoon, where the player can create levels. Both modes can be accessed from a hub, taking the form of a cardboard spaceship known as the "Pod".

The story mode of LittleBigPlanet consists of eight themed areas, each with three or four main levels. Hidden keys unlock bonus levels for a grand total of fifty. Although the story mode is in sequential order, each of the levels can be replayed. Each one is designed around the control scheme of Sackboy and the themes of its area. For example, the Metropolis levels involve navigating sewers and hopping on subways. Levels contain different prize bubbles, which contain items, including costumes, stickers, songs, and objects, alongside score bubbles, which when collected in a chain, can multiply the score gained. Each level has checkpoints, where Sackboy can respawn if he dies. Each checkpoint has three or, in some cases, infinite available uses. If the last activated checkpoint runs out of uses, the level ends. The player can play the game with up to three other players. Some puzzles for finding prize bubbles in story mode require more than one player.

=== Content creation ===
The Popit gives Sackboy access to various creative tools. During play mode, the Popit can only be used to access stickers and character customization. Stickers can be stamped on any object. Throughout story mode, there are blank canvases that require a specific sticker to be placed on them to collect prize bubbles. The player may customize Sackboy in a variety of ways: by selecting a base color and texture of the Sackboy's skin, giving them accessories, or placing stickers and decorations. At any point, the player can give Sackboy one of four emotions—happy, sad, scared, and angry—with an emotion capable of being given a degree of intensity.

The main focus of LittleBigPlanet is the level editor, which incorporates a large number of editing tools and objects, accessible from the Popit, to create levels from any degree of complexity. There is a collection of interactive tutorials required to use their respective tools. To accommodate potential mistakes, the editor features a manipulable time system, whereby the player may "rewind", which acts as an undo feature, or pause the editor, which temporarily halts objects that are normally governed by the physics engine. The player may create new objects by starting with a basic shape of a material and "drawing" it into the level. Objects may be glued to each other or to the level floor. Mechanical tools are also available, such as a strings and bolts to connect objects, various sensors, triggers, and attachable rocket motors to propel objects. After creating custom objects, the player may save a creation to their library for later use; these objects can be shared by placing them inside a prize bubble in their level to be collected by other players.

The player used to be able to publish their levels to the online community for other players, accessible from LittleBigPlanet. One option was "Cool Levels", which allowed the player to play levels at random. These levels could be played in both online and local multiplayer mode. Once completed, the player could tag the level from a list of predefined words, allowing other players to quickly find their level of choice by searching a specific tag, and rate the level out of five stars. However, since 13 September 2021, the online servers for LittleBigPlanet have been shut down.

== Plot ==
=== Setting and characters ===
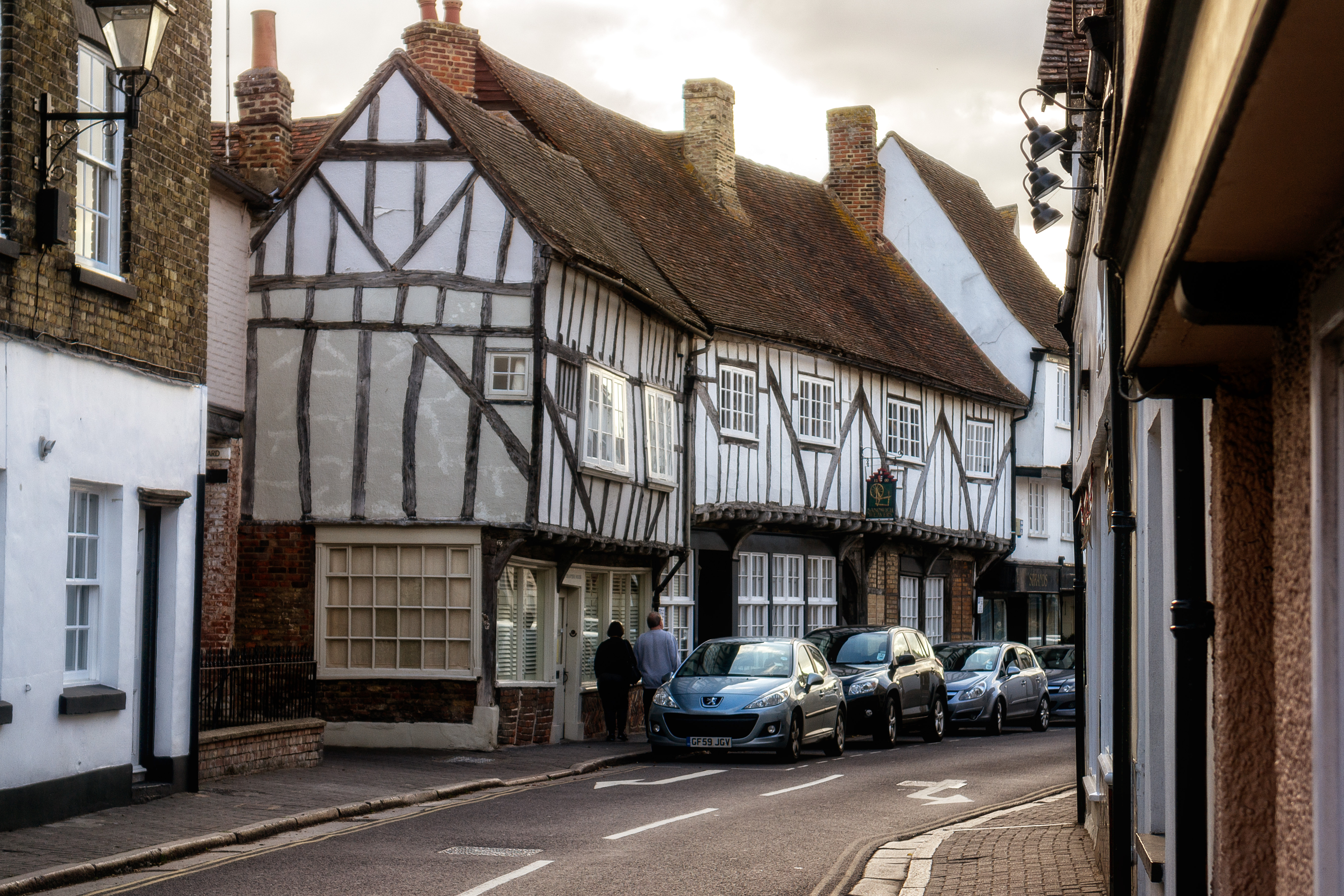
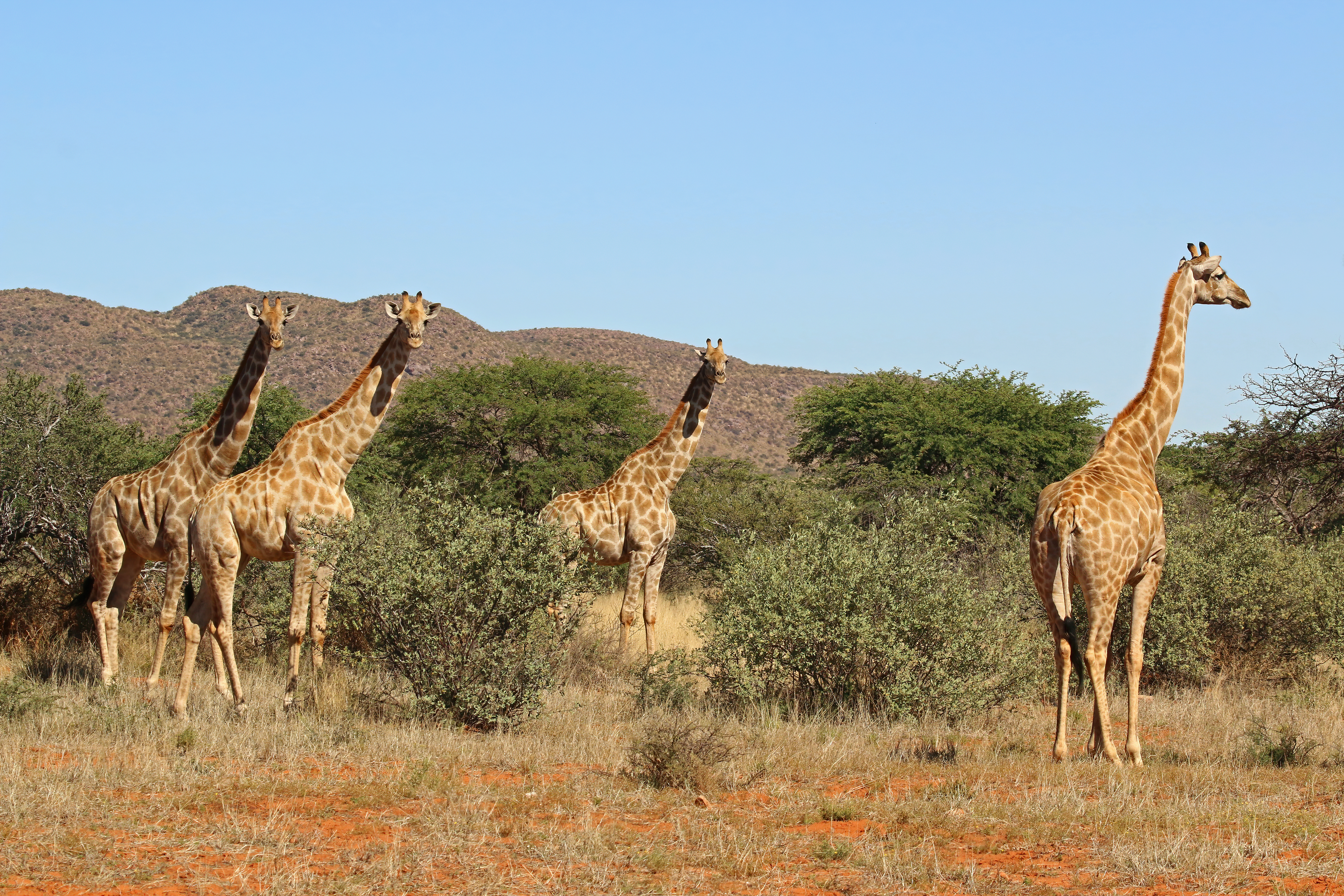
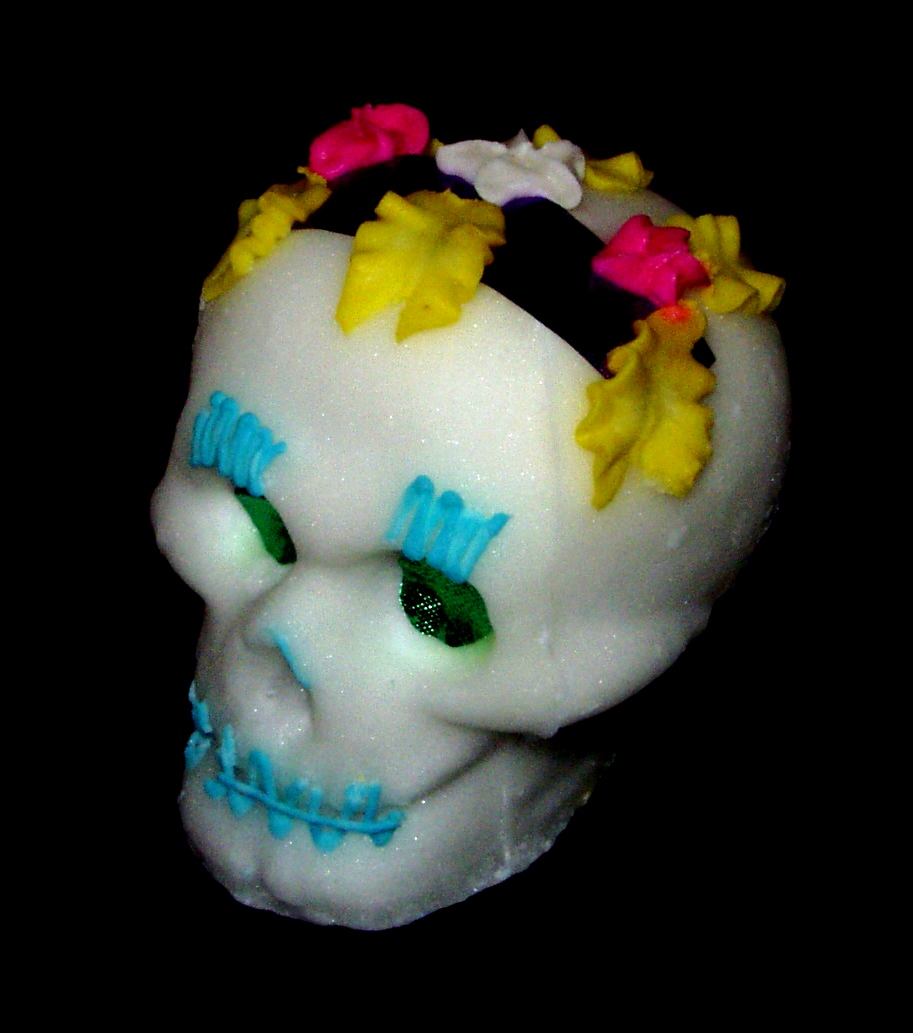
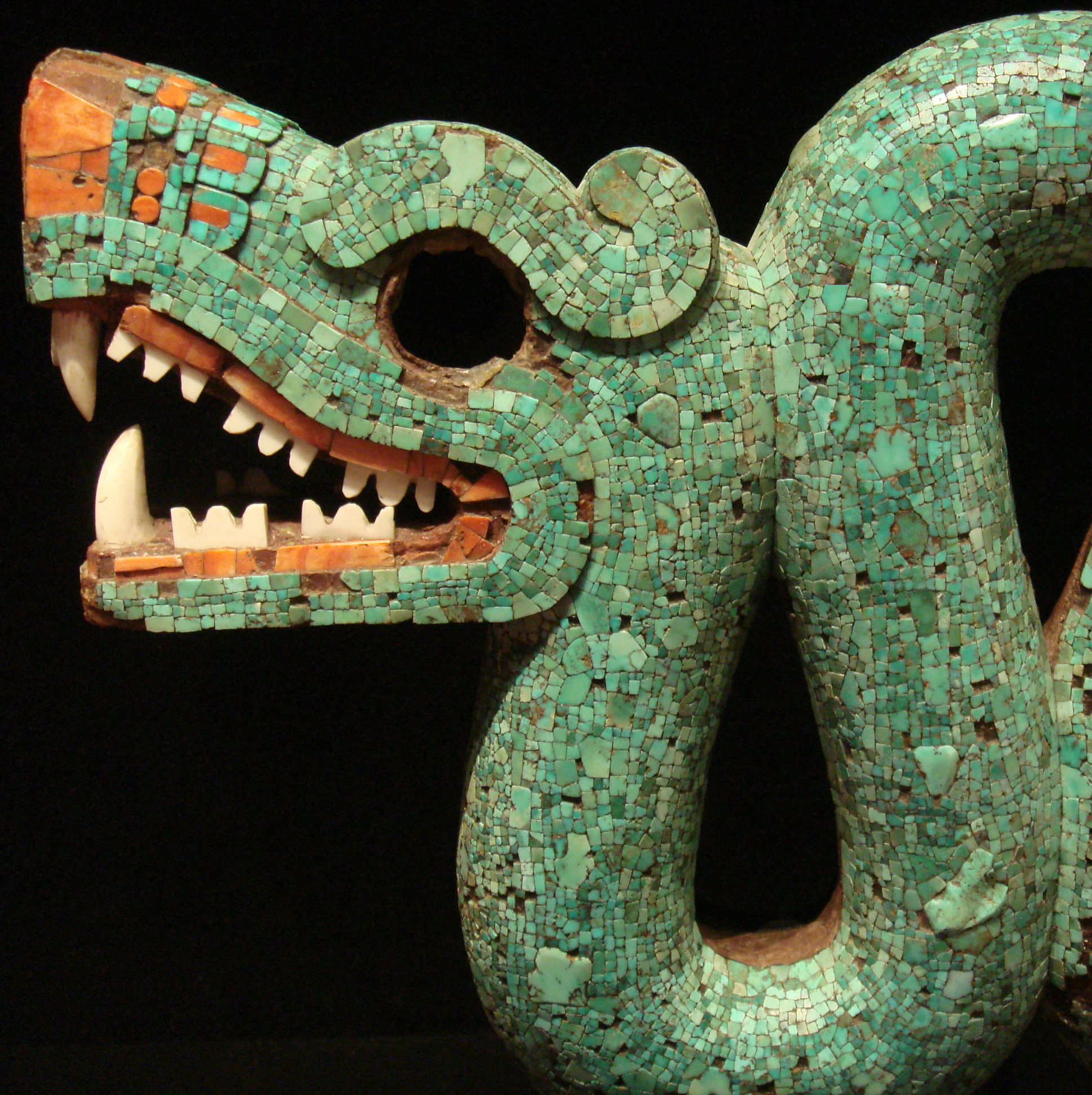
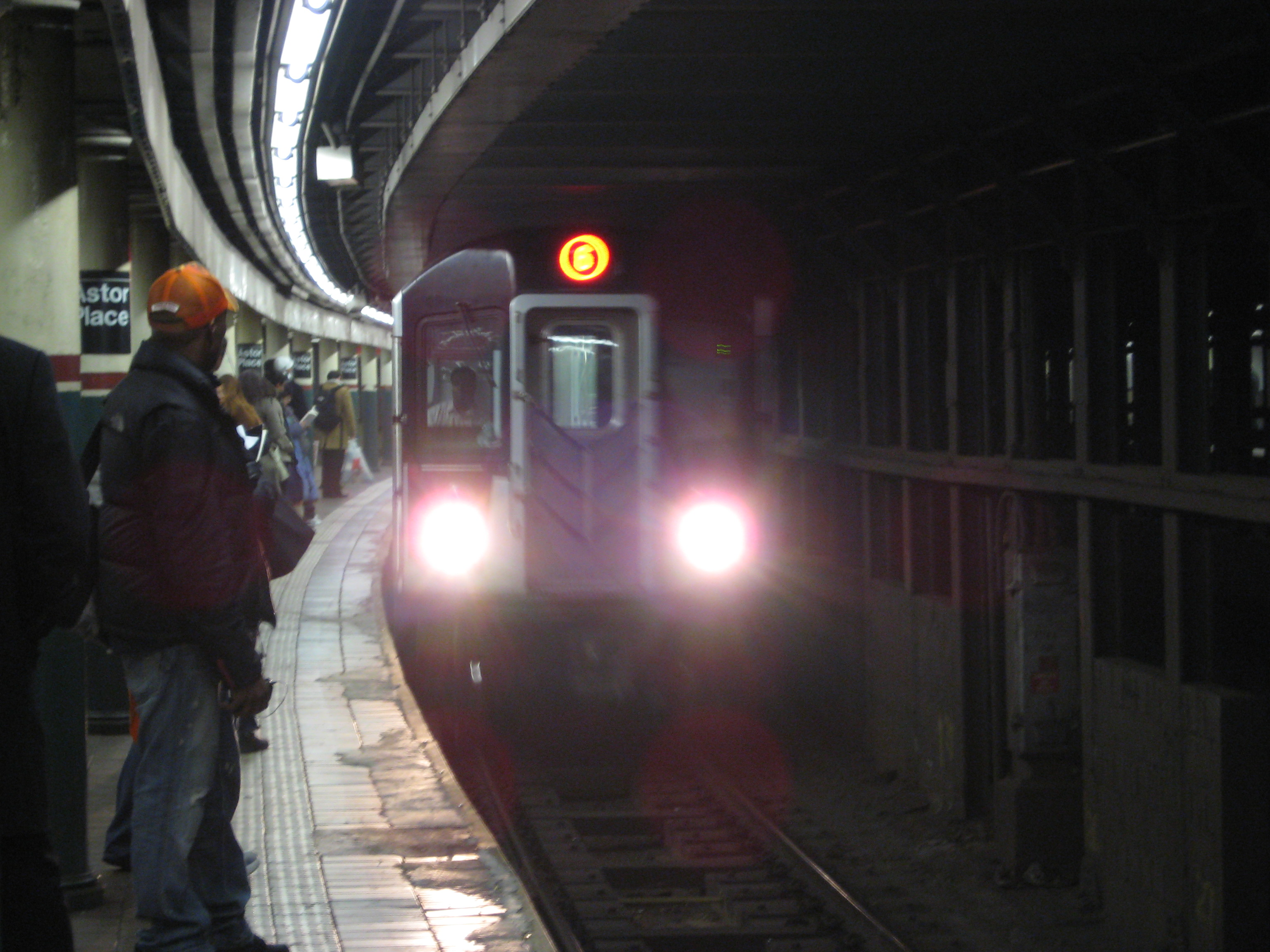
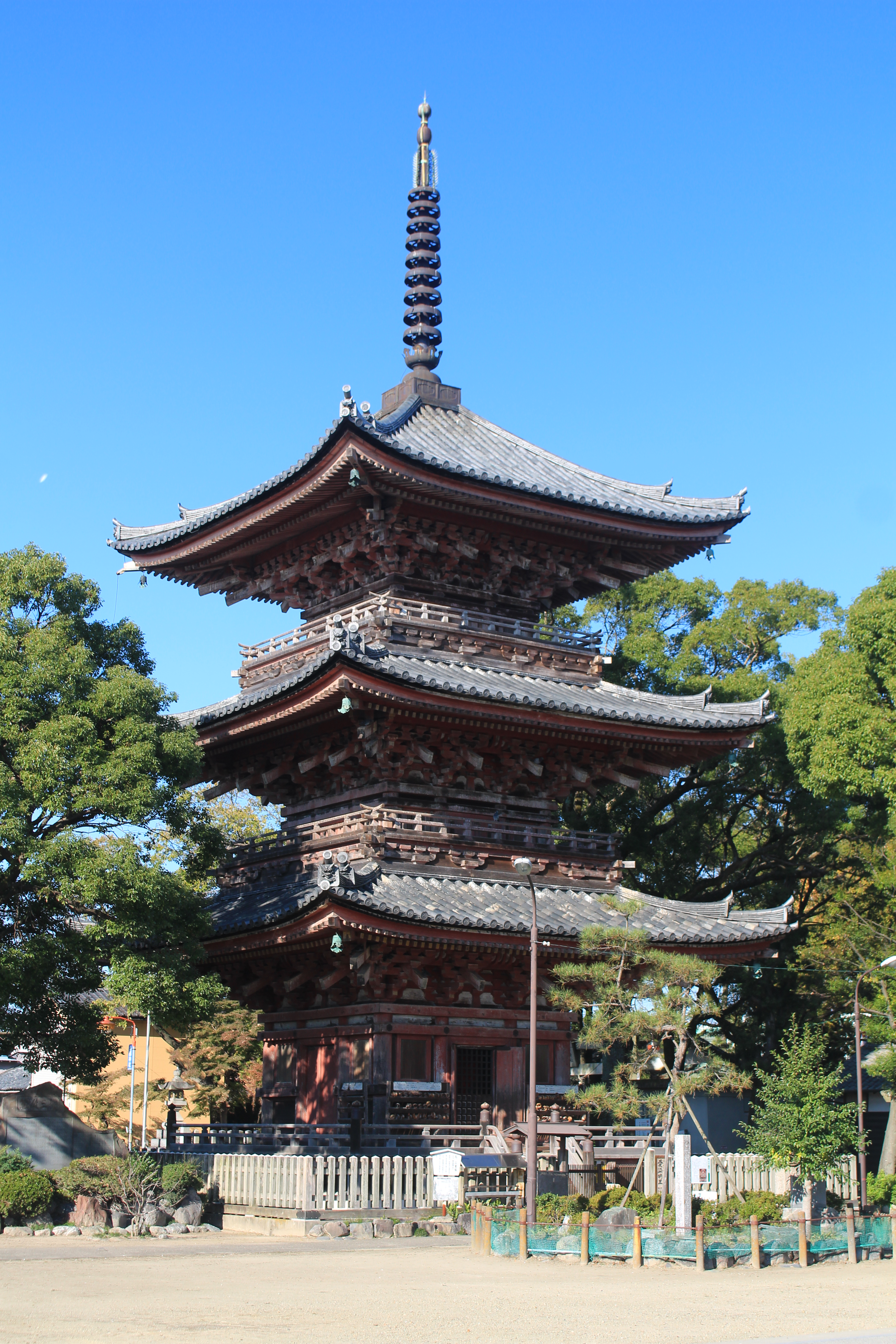
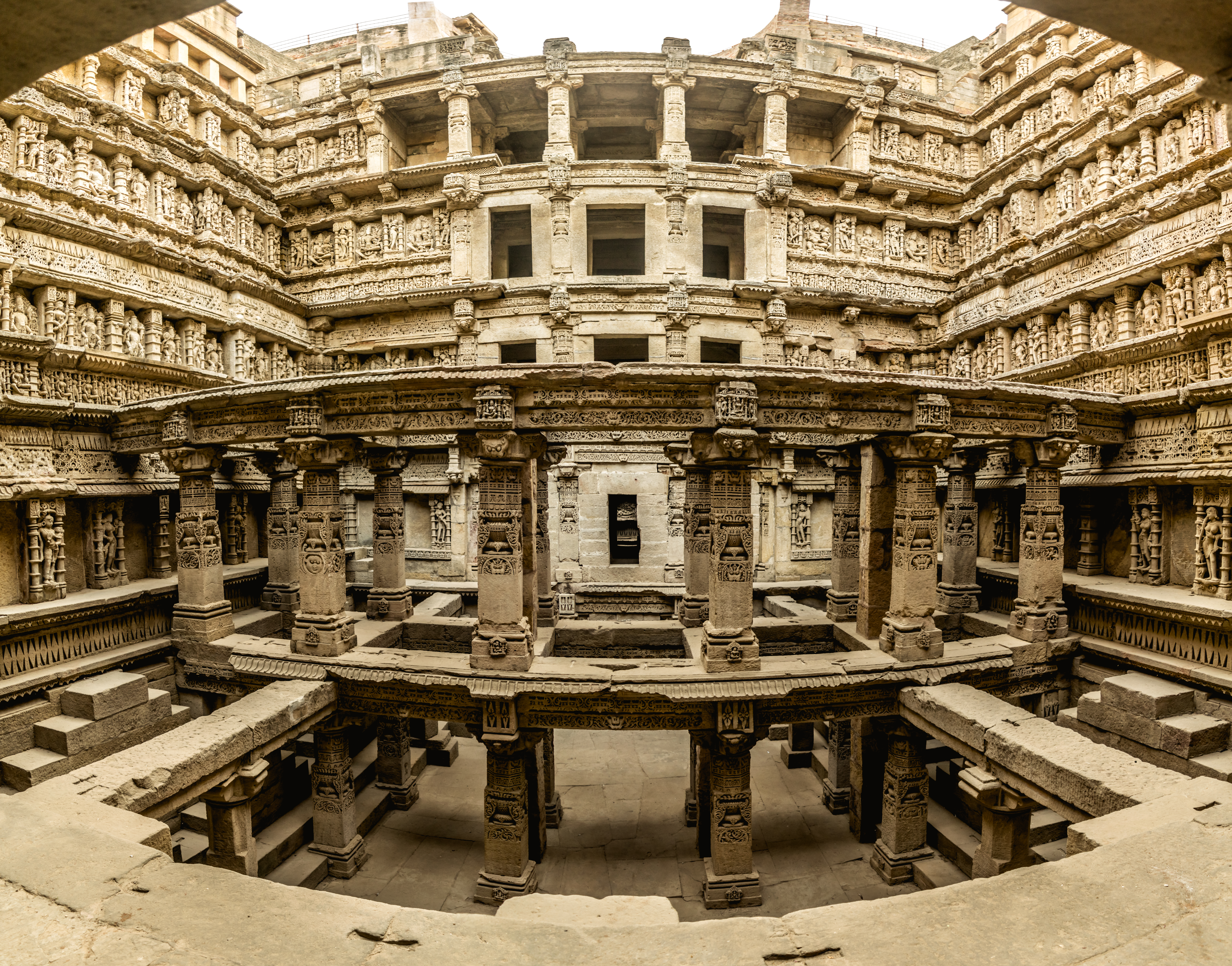
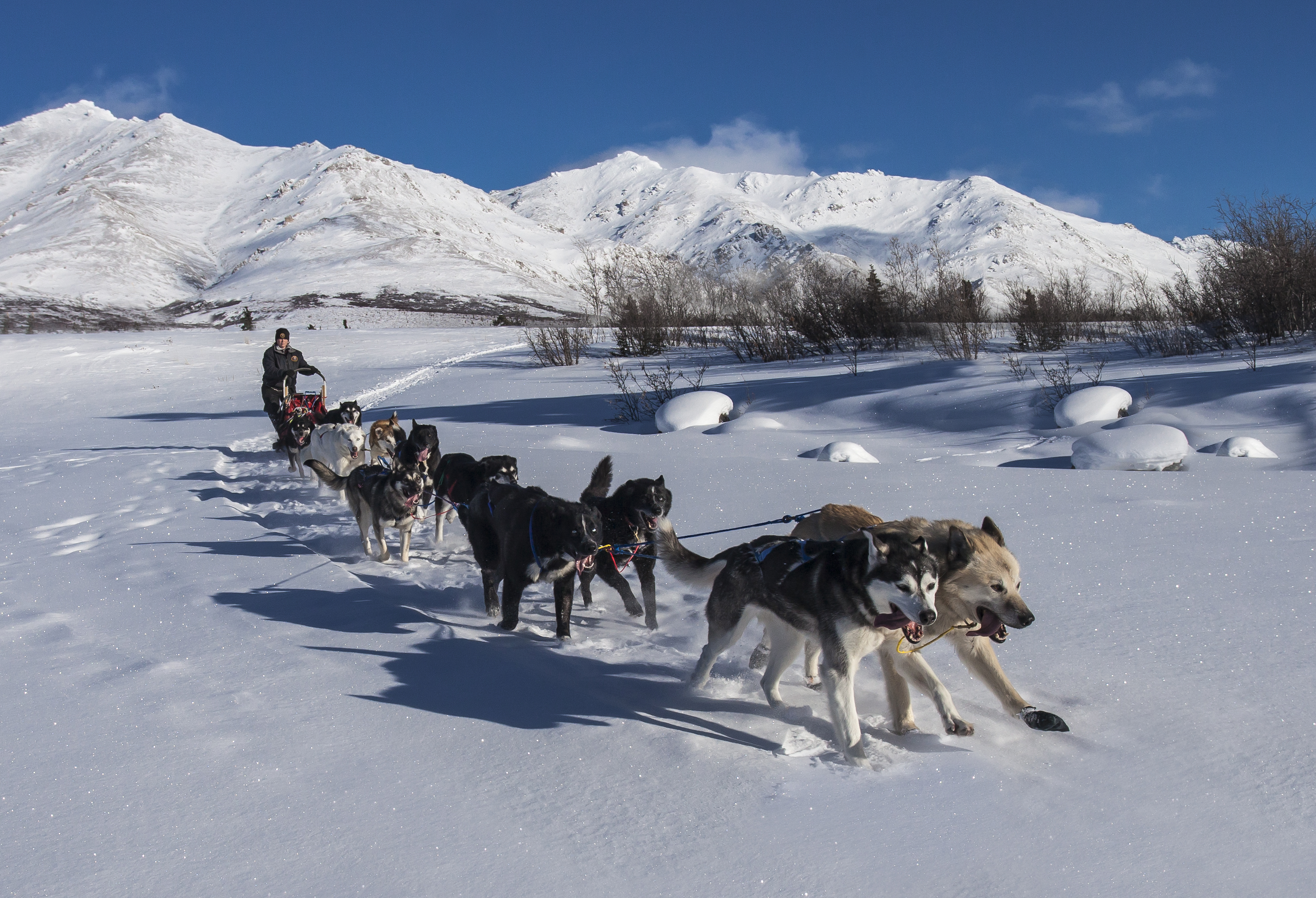
Each theme is based on a location around the world and incorporates their respective elements. From left to right from top: Tudor England, the savanna, calavera for the Day of the Dead, Aztec serpents, American urban transport, Japanese pagodas, Indian architecture, and winter sled dogs

LittleBigPlanet is set on the eponymous planet, a realm made of pure imagination, with each area created by their focus character, known collectively as the Curator Creators. Sackboy explores eight of them, each with a theme based on locations around the world, incorporating their respective elements, including the United Kingdom, Africa, South America, Mexico, the United States, Japan, India, and Siberia. The eight areas are the Gardens, the Savannah, the Weddings, the Canyons, the Metropolis, the Islands, the Temples, and the Wilderness; each Creator Curator being the King, Zola the Lion King, Frida, Uncle Jalapeño, Mags the Mechanic, Grandmaster Sensei, the Great Magician, and the Collector, respectively.

=== Story ===
After Sackboy explores the Gardens, learning various tools along the way, the King sends Sackboy to the Savannah for him to begin his adventure. In the Savannah, Sackboy accidentally destroys one of Zola's creations upon arrival, but Zola agrees to forgive Sackboy if Sackboy finds out what is troubling the bison; the cause is discovered to be crocodiles. The conflict is resolved when Sackboy proves King Croc's innocence in the disappearance of Meerkat Mum's son, Stripy Tail, after finding him at a VIP room in a club. In the Weddings, Sackboy reunites Frida with her groom Don Lu, who disappeared during their wedding reception. In the Canyons, Sackboy rescues Don Lu's uncle Jalapeño from the corrupt Sheriff Zapata, who is afterward incinerated by his own bombs while trying to kill Sackboy. In the Metropolis, Sackboy retrieves Mags the Mechanic's car, which had been stolen by the martial artist Ze Dude, before winning a match against Ze Dude and his bouncers. In the Islands, Sackboy uses Grandmaster Sensei's flame-throwing cat to defeat the Terrible Oni.

In the Temples, the Goddess reveals to Sackboy that the Great Magician needs help to "bring sharing back to LittleBigPlanet." According to the Great Magician, the Collector is stealing creations around LittleBigPlanet and "not sharing them around the world." The Great Magician teleports Sackboy to the Wilderness to find the Collector. Sackboy breaches the Collector's base and starts freeing all the inhabitants of LittleBigPlanet from their cages, including the curator creators. Sackboy confronts the Collector, who attacks Sackboy with machines. After Sackboy destroys the machines, the Collector tries to escape through his pod, which breaks down. Defeated, the Collector admits that he became evil because he has no friends to share with. The King appears and addresses the player, calling for the player to be a part of the LittleBigPlanet community.

== Development ==
=== Background and concept ===
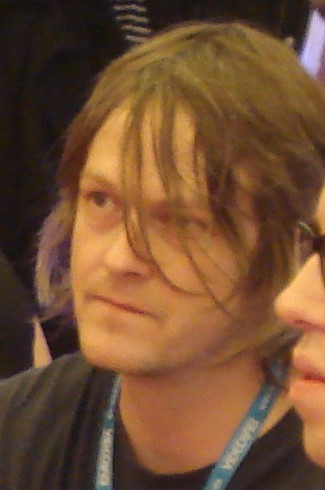
Mark Healey

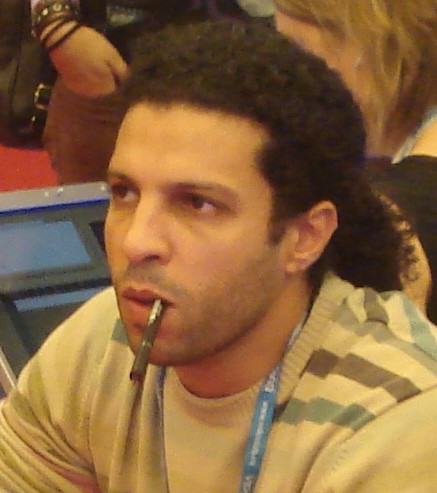
Kareem Ettouney

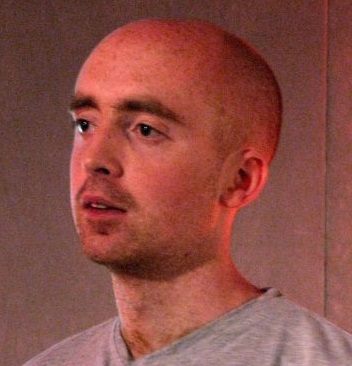
Alex Evans

Healey, Ettouney (both pictured in 2007), Evans (2008), and David Smith (not pictured) founded Media Molecule.

Mark Healey, Kareem Ettouney, Alex Evans, and Dave Smith worked at Lionhead Studios and developed the 3D platformer Rag Doll Kung Fu (2005), the first third-party video game released on Steam. After a cinema visit to see Howl's Moving Castle, Healey and Smith discussed a game that had character controls similar to Rag Doll Kung Fu that would be playable on a game console. Afterward, the four left Lionhead Studios in December 2005 to develop the game, forming Media Molecule, previously known as Brainfluff. At the time, they only had a vague idea of what game they wanted to create, with them generally wanting to create an ambitious console-friendly game that utilised user-generated content, appealed to a broad audience, and proved that a small company could develop a mainstream game.

The same month, Media Molecule pitched a prototype, a physics-based 2D side-scrolling game named Craftworld, to Phil Harrison, the president of Sony Computer Entertainment Worldwide Studios, using their own software rather than PowerPoint to allow for live, controllable movement of the game characters. By their own admission, the pitch was vague. They intentionally toned down the creative aspect of the game for fear of negative reception of their pitch, instead presenting the prototype purely as a playable game and only briefly mentioning user creation. According to Evans, Harrison noticed and asked them why they had chosen not to explore this element further. The meeting, which had been scheduled to last 45 minutes, lasted three hours, ending with Sony agreeing to fund the project for six months. Media Molecule became incorporated as a company in February 2006.

After some further development, Sony asked the team to present their progress in what Healey described as a "Dragons' Den style scenario". Following this, Sony gave them a deal to develop LittleBigPlanet for the PlayStation 3 in exchange for exclusivity and ownership of the intellectual property. Despite backing from Sony, Media Molecule was concerned about the direction of the game and whether people would like it, though these were dispelled after the game's announcement at Game Developers Conference 2007 (GDC 2007). At the time, Media Molecule were aware of the fact that Sony wanted them to demonstrate the game at the upcoming convention, but they were unaware that they were to be part of Phil Harrison's keynote speech until near the date it was due to take place. Healey stated that it was only when they arrived in San Francisco for the conference that they realised the extent of Sony's dedication to the game, saying that although the revelation boosted their confidence, it also increased the pressure to meet expectations.

=== Design ===
Healey was the creative director, Ettouney was the art director, and Evans and Smith were the technical directors. LittleBigPlanet was designed around its associated tagline: "Play, Create, Share". Healey wanted LittleBigPlanet to bridge the gap between casual and hardcore gaming. A particular goal was to make it so that players could create levels of higher quality than even the story levels. Though the game was meant to be ambitious and to allow players to creatively express themselves, constraints were deliberately placed on the game to make the game more focused and fun, and to appeal to uncreative people.

Prior to the creation of Sackboy, Smith designed Mr. Yellowhead to be the player character for the Craftworld prototype. After the prototype was showcased to Harrison, the design of Mr. Yellowhead evolved, over time, into the modern form of Sackboy. The reason Sackboy was created was to serve as the customisable avatar for the player. For this reason, Sackboy was not given a voice or a defined personality. One of the goals of designing Sackboy was to make him appeal to a broad audience. The zipper used on the modern design was initially going to be used to access Create Mode, though it was scrapped and eventually replaced with MyMoon.

LittleBigPlanet was designed to be supported post-release, with Evans stating that Media Molecule would be supporting the community "massively". Through the use of updates, Media Molecule made changes to the game after release. The studio also has the ability to add content packs, new game modes, and new objects. Although, there were no plans to add additional features through updates, they did decide to use patches to add LittleBigStore and online access to Create mode, neither of which were available when the game was first released. Originally, Harrison wanted to create LittleBigPlanet as a downloadable service that monetised user-generated content, but that was scrapped early on.

=== Audio and music ===
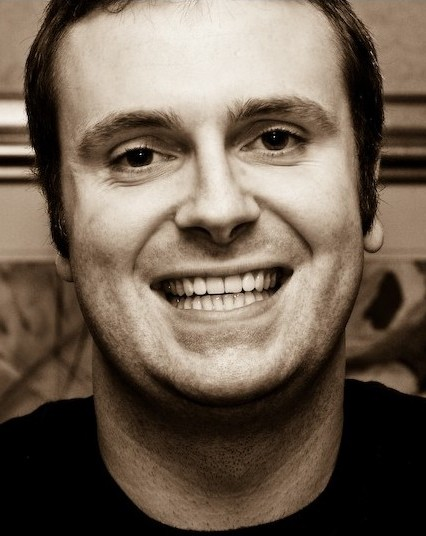
Kenneth Young (pictured in 2007) was a composer for LittleBigPlanet.

Kenneth Young, Daniel Pemberton, and Mat Clark were the composers for LittleBigPlanet. Young also served as the audio designer, while Matt Willis served as the audio programmer. Stephen Fry was the narrator. Young joined Media Molecule in 2007 following their presentation at GDC. He did the majority of the sound work and composed a few of the songs, along with "directing the composers and the creative side of the music licensing process, producing the voice localisation from the Mm side of things, [and] being heavily involved in the design of the audio-centric UGC features of the game." There were plans in 2006 to add a music sequencer for players to create their own music, but it was delayed until the development of LittleBigPlanet 2. A soundtrack album titled LittleBigMusic was released digitally on December 15, 2008, containing Pemberton's contributions.

LittleBigPlanet contains 21 licensed tracks and 14 original tracks made by the composers, with key licensed bands including the Go! Team and Battles. The licensed songs were sought for and negotiated by Young. Much of the original music took influence from world music, mashups, and 1970s television shows for children. Interactive tracks, most of which were composed by Clark, allow the player to change what instruments are playing at any given time. The main theme was composed by Pemberton.

One of the licensed songs in the game is Toumani Diabate's "Tapha Niang", from Boulevard de l'Independance (2006). The song contained lyrics, sung by Moussa Diabate, that lamented the death of Diabate's brother Mustapha and used passages from the Qur'an, the Islamic religious text. Though Toumani was a "devout Muslim", the inclusion of the song in beta versions of LittleBigPlanet was met with controversy among Muslim gamers who found combining the text of the Qur'an with music to be offensive. They requested Sony Computer Entertainment (SCE) to remove the track via a patch. Subsequently, LittleBigPlanet was recalled from retailers worldwide on 17 October 2008, delaying its release. Version 1.02 was implemented to remove the lyrical content of "Tapha Niang".

== Release ==
=== Promotion and anticipation ===
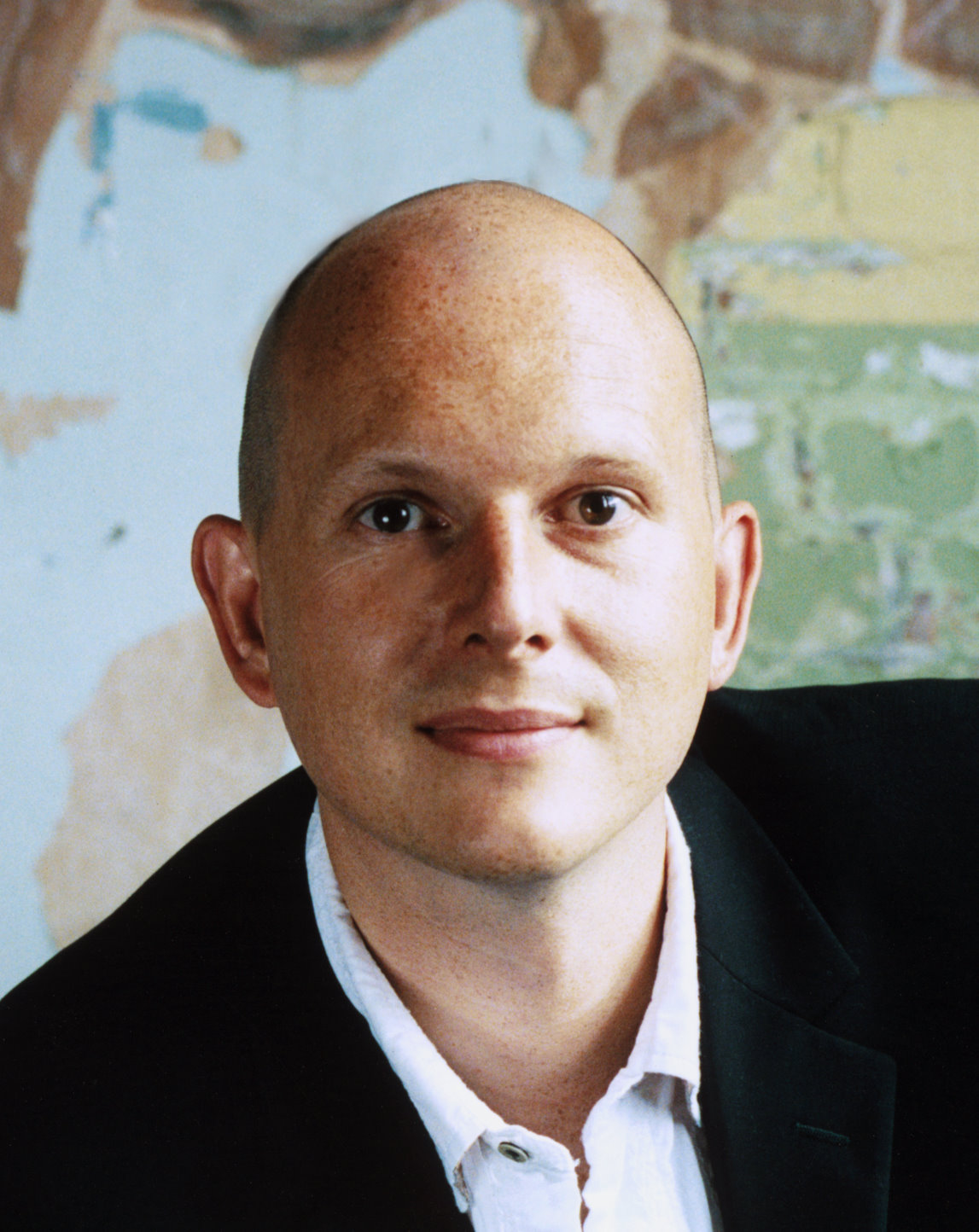
Phil Harrison (pictured in 2007) announced LittleBigPlanet during his keynote address at GDC 2007.

LittleBigPlanet was first announced in March 2007 at the GDC during Harrison's keynote address about innovative trends of customisation and social interaction in contemporary games. During the address, Healey conducted a demonstration of the game's various creative tools and a pre-made level. In July 2007, the game was presented in a similar fashion at the Electronic Entertainment Expo (E3). It was showcased at the Tokyo Game Show (TGS) in September 2007, at the Consumer Electronics Show (CES) in January 2008, and at the Leipzig Games Convention in August 2008. LittleBigPlanet was also showcased for a second time at E3 in July 2008 and at TGS in October 2008.

SCE undertook a pre-order campaign in the run-up to the game's release. In August 2008 in North America, SCE partnered with several major online retailers to offer unique bonus gifts to customers pre-ordering the game from the selected retailers. These gifts include a sticker book, a burlap pouch, and an official game guide, along with downloadable costumes for Sackboy, such as Kratos from God of War and Nariko from Heavenly Sword. According to Engadget, while the United States got all the pre-order bonuses, Canada only got the Kratos and Nariko costumes. In Europe, Play.com offered the Nariko costume to customers who pre-ordered the game.

Around May 2007, a demo of LittleBigPlanet was rumoured. Although it was planned to be released in late 2007, public relations officer Ron Eagle confirmed in December that there would be no demo that year. In September 2008, a limited public beta was made available to stress test the sharing functions in LittleBigPlanet. Availability lasted from 24 September to 11 October 2008. Players were required to have access to a beta key, which was a code that could be inputted at the PlayStation Store for access to the beta test. Various sites gave out beta keys around that time, including Eurogamer and IGN.

LittleBigPlanet became one of the most widely anticipated PlayStation 3 games of 2008, with favorable coverage from the press and particular hype from beta testers. Jeremy Dunham of IGN reported after GDC 2007, "even in the presence of Home, (Note: PlayStation Home was the main feature promoted in Harrison's address.) Sony's impressive new community software, LittleBigPlanet stole the show at Phil Harrison's Game 3.0 practice conference, and was the thing that everyone was talking about." The presentation for E3 2007 won the Game Critics Awards for "Best Original Game", and the presentation for E3 2008 won "Best Console Game" and "Best Social/Casual/Puzzle". Evans expressed surprise at the hype of the game, stating, "We had no expectation that it would become so strongly associated as a lead title on a platform."

=== Release and further development ===
The first announcements pointed to a full release early in 2008, but Sony later said the game had been delayed until September 2008 in the UK. During Sony PlayStation Day on 6 May 2008 in London, Sony announced the game would be delayed until October. By September 2008, the release date was confirmed to be 21 October 2008 in North- and Latin America, with a European release later that week. However, it was brought to the attention of SCE that the in-game song, "Tapha Niang", contained expressions from the Qur'an. On 17 October, SCE instigated a recall of all copies of LittleBigPlanet from retailers to avoid offending Muslims and to remove the lyrics. This recall delayed the release of the game.

Before LittleBigPlanet's release, two patches were released. Version 1.01 added new costumes and tweaked online functionality, and version 1.02 removed the lyrics from "Tapha Niang". LittleBigPlanet was first released in North America on 27 October 2008, with the servers being activated the same day. It was then released in Japan on 30 October, Europe on 5 November 2008, and Australia on 7 November. All levels that were created during the beta phase were transferred to the final version. On 28 October, the servers were shut down due to "glitching issues". Version 1.03 was released 30 October to lighten server Loads.

On 19 December 2008, version 1.07 was released, featuring the addition of an in-game store to buy downloadable content (DLC) and an overhaul of the level search function. Version 1.12, codenamed the "Cornish Yarg" update, was released on 16 April 2009. It featured a music player that allowed users to play songs from the PlayStation menu and an improved decoration mode, among other fixes. Version 1.21 was codenamed the "Leerdammer" update, and was released on 30 November 2009. It added the ability to access create mode while online with friends, along with a more location-based matchmaking system and various other changes.

A Game of the Year Edition of LittleBigPlanet was released in North America on 8 September 2009. This version included all of the content from the original game, as well as exclusive levels from 18 members of the LittleBigPlanet community. The re-release also included the Metal Gear Solid, Monsters, and History costume and level packs, and the Animals costume pack. A limited number of copies of the game also included a code that gave the player access to a beta of ModNation Racers. Initially, there were no plans to release the Game of the Year Edition in Europe; however, a version for the United Kingdom was eventually announced for release on 16 April 2010.

LBP.me, the community web portal for LittleBigPlanet that allowed players to search for community levels, was launched in December 2010. Following the 2011 PlayStation Network outage, Sony offered, for 30 days, two free selections, out of five games, as part of the "Welcome Back" campaign, one of which was LittleBigPlanet. In July 2016, all LittleBigPlanet servers were shut down in Japan, though they remained online outside of Japan, besides LittleBigPlanet Karting and LittleBigPlanet (2009). LBP.me was shut down in November 2020. On 12 March 2021, all the servers in the LittleBigPlanet franchise were shut down. Although the cited reason was "technical issues", many players believed it was because of a DDOS attack. Although, the servers were briefly brought back online on 22 May 2021, they were taken down again because of DDOS attacks, harassment, and hate speech. The servers were permanently closed on 13 September 2021, after months of issues, with the exception of the PlayStation 4 port of LittleBigPlanet 3, which was shut down on 8 January 2024. On 19 April 2024, the decision was made permanent due to ongoing technical issues.

=== Downloadable content ===
Over the years, LittleBigPlanet and the franchise it spawned have gathered a large amount of downloadable content (DLC), most of which was based on third-party media, which in the first game were typically PlayStation games and "longstanding transmedia properties" such as Disney. In general, there were two types of DLC: costume packs and level kits. Categories of costume packs include seasonal, regular, and licensed. Seasonal & Limited Time costumes are free, while regular and licensed costumes require payment. The DLC in the first game was made compatible with other games in the franchise in August 2012. The first level kit was the Festive Level Pack, which contained Christmas-related objects and stickers. It was available from 18 December 2008 to 8 January 2009.

A level kit and costume pack based on Metal Gear Solid was released on 23 December 2008. The level kit had five main levels and various objects and stickers. One of the objects was the Paintinator. On 23 April 2009, Creator Pack 1 was released as a downloadable content pack for free. This pack added new Create-mode tools, including a new type of checkpoint which provides the player with an infinite number of lives for a given section, a tetherless version of the jetpack, and a power-up removal marker that forces the player to drop any power-ups such as the jetpack. The History Kit was released on 13 August 2009 with various historical-themed objects and stickers, along with a sound object and music track. Three new songs composed by Clark were released on 8 October 2009, as the MM Music Pack 1. The songs were "Well Trained", "Wise Owl", and "Tea By The Sea".

After being announced in August 2009, water was added to the game through a level kit based on Pirates of the Caribbean, which was released on 22 December 2009, along with a related costume pack. The level kit also had five levels and various objects and stickers. DLC related to The Incredibles, which includes costumes based on the characters and a level kit containing themed stickers and items, was released on 8 April 2010. The Marvel DLC was added to LittleBigPlanet on 7 July 2010, including a few costumes and a level kit containing Marvel-themed stickers, music, and items. On 31 December 2015, the Marvel DLC was removed from the PlayStation Store, making them unavailable to players who had not purchased them at the time. On 21 December 2017, all Disney-related DLC for the franchise was removed from the PlayStation Store. This included many costume packs and the two Disney-related level kits from the first game, which were based on Pirates of the Caribbean and the Incredibles.

== Reception ==
Reception

Aggregate score
Aggregator	Score
Metacritic	95/100

Review scores
Publication	Score
1Up.com	A+
Computer and Video Games	9.6/10
Edge	10/10
Eurogamer	9/10
Game Informer	9.5/10
GamePro	5/5
GameSpot	9/10
Giant Bomb	5/5
IGN	UK: 9.7/10; US: 9.5/10; AU: 9.2/10
PlayStation Official Magazine – UK	10/10
X-Play	5/5

Awards
Publication	Award
Eurogamer	Best Game (2008)
GamePro	Game of the Year (2008)
GameTrailers	Most Innovative Game (2008)
IGN	Best New IP (2008); Most Innovative Design (2008)

=== Reviews ===
LittleBigPlanet received widespread critical acclaim. Mike D'Alonzo of X-Play stated, "The game has a few issues that could certainly use some tweaking, but they don't even come close to making this anything less than one of the most incredible games ever made." GamePro's Tae K. Kim called LittleBigPlanet "one of the most amazing and interesting gaming experiences ever designed." LittleBigPlanet was called by Edge "one of gaming's rare triumphs."

The creative aspect of LittleBigPlanet has been widely praised by critics, though some have noted how it takes patience to create a great level. Nick Suttner from 1Up.com praised the create mode. Mike Jackson of Computer and Video Games pointed out that user-generated content had been talked about in the gaming industry, and felt that Sony successfully created a great game in this matter with LittleBigPlanet. Game Informer's Joe Juba noted how "The tools are complicated enough to perform complex tasks, but simple enough to be accessible to any motivated gamer." Kim agreed and praised the create mode for being "powerful enough" for the player to create the desired level. Oli Welsh from Eurogamer said that LittleBigPlanet's "creative tools turn it into something else entirely, a unique, hilarious, endless entertainment."

The community aspect has also been widely praised. Some critics have recommended playing LittleBigPlanet with an online connection. D'Alonzo found the online community features to be "as slick as they are accessible." Welsh in particular found the tagging system in Cool Levels to be "genius". Despite the praise of the community, views of LittleBigPlanet's multiplayer were largely mixed. Guy Cocker of GameSpot wrote that LittleBigPlanet was more fun when playing with multiple players, but more flawed as a result, citing the "memorable" multiplayer puzzles as good, but the clunkiness of the multiplayer in general as bad. Matt Wales from IGN noticed that cooperative play was not a significant part of the game.

The story mode was generally praised. Chris Roper of IGN found the first three levels of the story mode to be a good introduction to the game. Leon Purley of PlayStation Official Magazine – UK praised the mix of "action, challenge, and wonder" in the story mode, finding the quality to be perfect and recommending it those who are weary after encountering create mode. Suttner said that story mode "features some of the most endearing 2D levels in modern gaming." John Teti, writing for The A.V. Club, called the plot brief and brilliant with replay value. In contrast, Seth Schiesel of The New York Times found it to be lacklustre, finding the levels made by the community to be better. Variety's Ben Fritz found the story mode to be "less [of] an experience ... than an exercise in collecting hundreds of items and tools and learning how to use them."

=== Sales ===
Despite the widespread publicity LittleBigPlanet had before and after release, sales had dwindled toward the end of 2008. In the UK, LittleBigPlanet entered the all-formats charts, recorded by the ELSPA, at #4 before dropping, being at #19 by November 2008. before dropping to #29. LittleBigPlanet sales increased by 58 per cent and raised it from #29 to #16 in the charts by mid-December. In the US, the game sold 356,000 units during October and November, placing it fourth amongst all PlayStation 3 software sales for that period. It entered October's chart, recorded by the NPD Group, at #8 before falling out of the top 20 by the end of November. In Japan, LittleBigPlanet had sold 52,000 copies. Sony responded to the lacklustre sales by saying that they were pleased by the performance, citing LittleBigPlanet being a new IP and claiming that it was released in an "incredibly volatile time of year and the chart reflects that."

In January 2009, Sony announced that the game had sold 611,000 units in North America up to the end of December 2008 and that LittleBigPlanet had sold 1.3 million units worldwide. The game sold 300,000 units at the beginning of February 2009. By March 2010, the game had sold over 3 million copies worldwide. Following the PSN outage in April 2011, LittleBigPlanet gained 1.5 million new users. By October 2018, LittleBigPlanet had sold over 4 million copies.

=== Awards and accolades ===
LittleBigPlanet was nominated for and won numerous awards. LittleBigPlanet won the most awards in the 10th Annual NAVGTR Awards in 2008, winning six of the ten awards it was nominated for. They were "Game of the Year", "Game Design", "Game Original Children's", "Graphics/Technical", Innovation in Game Play", and "Supp Performance in a Comedy". LittleBigPlanet was judged "Best PlayStation 3 Game" at the 2008 Spike Video Game Awards. LittleBigPlanet was given the award for "Artistic Achievement" at the 5th British Academy Video Games Awards. LittleBigPlanet won in eight categories out of ten nominations during the AIAS 12th Annual Interactive Achievement Awards, garnering "Overall Game of the Year", "Console Game of the Year", "Family Game of the Year", "Outstanding Innovation in Gaming", outstanding achievement in "Art Direction", "Character Performance" (Sackboy), "Game Direction", and "Visual Engineering". It was given the awards for "Best New Debut", "Best Game Design", "Best Technology", and the "Innovation Award" at the Game Developers Choice Awards. It won all the categories it was nominated for in the 2009 Develop Industry Excellence Awards, winning "Best New IP", "Technical Innovation", and "Visual Arts". It won "Family Game of the Year" in the Golden Joystick Awards.

Among publications, LittleBigPlanet was ranked the best video game of 2008 by Eurogamer and GamePro. Other publications that ranked LittleBigPlanet among the best of the year included Game Informer, Joystiq, The Telegraph, and Time. IGN awarded LittleBigPlanet "Best New IP" and "Best Platform Game" and nominated the game for "Overall Game of the Year". GameTrailers and Kotaku awarded LittleBigPlanet "Most Innovative Game" and "Best Innovation", respectively. LittleBigPlanet was ranked among the greatest video games of all time by Game Informer (2009), Edge (2013), IGN (2014), GamesRadar+ (2014), Empire (2014), and Polygon (2017).

Awards Awards and nominations
Year	Award ceremony	Category	Recipient	Result	Ref.
2008	10th Annual NAVGTR Awards	Game of the Year	LittleBigPlanet	Won	
2008	10th Annual NAVGTR Awards	Game Design	LittleBigPlanet	Won	
2008	10th Annual NAVGTR Awards	Game Original Children's	LittleBigPlanet	Won	
2008	10th Annual NAVGTR Awards	Graphics/Technical	LittleBigPlanet	Won	
2008	10th Annual NAVGTR Awards	Innovation In Game Play	LittleBigPlanet	Won	
2008	10th Annual NAVGTR Awards	Supp Performance in a Comedy	Stephen Fry	Won	
2008	10th Annual NAVGTR Awards	Art Direction in a Game Engine	LittleBigPlanet	Nominated	
2008	10th Annual NAVGTR Awards	Character Design	LittleBigPlanet	Nominated	
2008	10th Annual NAVGTR Awards	Control Design	LittleBigPlanet	Nominated	
2008	10th Annual NAVGTR Awards	Lighting/Texturing	LittleBigPlanet	Nominated	
2008	2008 Spike Video Game Awards	Studio of the Year	Media Molecule	Won	
2008	2008 Spike Video Game Awards	Best PS3 Game	LittleBigPlanet	Won	
2008	2008 Spike Video Game Awards	Game of the Year	LittleBigPlanet	Nominated	
2008	2008 Spike Video Game Awards	Best Graphics	LittleBigPlanet	Nominated	
2008	2008 Spike Video Game Awards	Best Original Score	LittleBigPlanet	Nominated	
2008	2008 Spike Video Game Awards	Best Performance by a Human Male	Stephen Fry	Nominated	
2008	2008 Spike Video Game Awards	Best Soundtrack	LittleBigPlanet	Nominated	
2009	5th British Academy Games Awards	Artistic Achievement in 2009	LittleBigPlanet	Won	
2009	5th British Academy Games Awards	Casual in 2009	LittleBigPlanet	Nominated	
2009	5th British Academy Games Awards	Game Award of 2008 in 2009	LittleBigPlanet	Nominated	
2009	5th British Academy Games Awards	Original Score in 2009	LittleBigPlanet	Nominated	
2009	5th British Academy Games Awards	Technical Achievement in 2009	LittleBigPlanet	Nominated	
2009	5th British Academy Games Awards	Use of Audio in 2009	LittleBigPlanet	Nominated	
2009	7th Game Audio Network Guild Awards	Best Interactive Score	LittleBigPlanet	Won	
2009	7th Game Audio Network Guild Awards	Best Original Instrumental	"The Gardens"	Won	
2009	7th Game Audio Network Guild Awards	Audio of the Year	LittleBigPlanet	Nominated	
2009	7th Game Audio Network Guild Awards	Music of the Year	LittleBigPlanet	Nominated	
2009	7th Game Audio Network Guild Awards	Sound Design of the Year	LittleBigPlanet	Nominated	
2009	7th Game Audio Network Guild Awards	Best Dialogue	LittleBigPlanet	Nominated	
2009	7th Game Audio Network Guild Awards	Best Original Vocal - Choral	"Main Theme"	Nominated	
2009	7th Game Audio Network Guild Awards	Best Use of Licensed Music	LittleBigPlanet	Nominated	
2009	10th Annual Game Developers Choice Awards	Best Debut	LittleBigPlanet	Won	
2009	10th Annual Game Developers Choice Awards	Game Design	LittleBigPlanet	Won	
2009	10th Annual Game Developers Choice Awards	Innovation Award	LittleBigPlanet	Won	
2009	10th Annual Game Developers Choice Awards	Technology	LittleBigPlanet	Won	
2009	10th Annual Game Developers Choice Awards	Game of the Year	LittleBigPlanet	Nominated	
2009	10th Annual Game Developers Choice Awards	Audio	LittleBigPlanet	Nominated	
2009	10th Annual Game Developers Choice Awards	Visual Design	LittleBigPlanet	Nominated	
2009	12th Annual Interactive Achievement Awards	Overall Game of the Year	LittleBigPlanet	Won	
2009	12th Annual Interactive Achievement Awards	Console Game of the Year	LittleBigPlanet	Won	
2009	12th Annual Interactive Achievement Awards	Family Game of the Year	LittleBigPlanet	Won	
2009	12th Annual Interactive Achievement Awards	Outstanding Achievement in Art Direction	LittleBigPlanet	Won	
2009	12th Annual Interactive Achievement Awards	Outstanding Achievement in Character Performance (Sackboy)	LittleBigPlanet	Won	
2009	12th Annual Interactive Achievement Awards	Outstanding Achievement in Game Direction	LittleBigPlanet	Won	
2009	12th Annual Interactive Achievement Awards	Outstanding Achievement in Visual Engineering	LittleBigPlanet	Won	
2009	12th Annual Interactive Achievement Awards	Outstanding Innovation in Gaming	LittleBigPlanet	Won	
2009	12th Annual Interactive Achievement Awards	Outstanding Achievement in Sound Design	LittleBigPlanet	Nominated	
2009	12th Annual Interactive Achievement Awards	Outstanding Achievement in Soundtrack	LittleBigPlanet	Nominated	
2009	2009 Develop Industry Excellence Awards	Best Independent Developer	Media Molecule	Won	
2009	2009 Develop Industry Excellence Awards	Best New IP	LittleBigPlanet	Won	
2009	2009 Develop Industry Excellence Awards	Best New Studio	Media Molecule	Won	
2009	2009 Develop Industry Excellence Awards	Technical Innovation	LittleBigPlanet	Won	
2009	2009 Develop Industry Excellence Awards	Visual Arts	LittleBigPlanet	Won	
2009	Golden Joystick Awards 2009	Family Game of the Year	LittleBigPlanet	Won	
2009	2009 British Academy Children's Awards	Video Game	LittleBigPlanet	Won	

== Legacy ==
=== Community ===
Around the time of its release, LittleBigPlanet took off in popularity, with Mikel Reparaz of GamesRadar+ having noticed in November 2008 that "hundreds, if not thousands, of PSN users ha[d] been uploading a continuous stream of homemade levels to the game's straining servers, with varying levels of quality and dedication." By July 2009, one million levels had been published on LittleBigPlanet, and by July 2013, eight million levels had been published across the franchise. There was a variety of levels created, including side-scrolling shooters. Reportedly, levels were being created that went "beyond even Media Molecule's wildest expectations." After a 2011 PSN outage, Evans had observed that multiple levels were being published per second and that "basically, everybody publishes a level." By the time the servers shut down for all games in the franchise, with the exception of the PS4 port of LittleBigPlanet 3, ten million levels had been published across the franchise.

Despite the popularity, there has been little scholarly research on the culture surrounding LittleBigPlanet. Though an early analysis focused on the commercial and technological infrastructures' influence on player innovation, later studies would focus on player agency within the community. Sara M. Grimes, of Cultural Studies, noted how the cultural scene is "tethered" to Sony and integrates player-based activity and cultures into the LittleBigPlanet brand. She concluded that the digital culture surrounding LittleBigPlanet could either be a call to revisit ways cultural scenes can be evaluated or a corporate-controlled infrastructure that is too broad to be considered a cultural scene.

=== Influence ===
While LittleBigPlanet was not the first game to be marketed around user creation and having PC players modify PC games, the required tools were not available to console players at the time. LittleBigPlanet was not only the first game of this type on console, but the first mainstream game to give players creative tools to create levels and share them with the community. The game coincided with the rise of user-generated content and proved that developing creation tools for video games was worth investing in. It was also an early example of website integration and public beta testing, which was not common before. By January 2009, Peter Molyneux of Lionhead Studio had declared the game to be "the most important creative innovation of 2008".

The success of LittleBigPlanet kickstarted a genre of video games where the player could create their own levels. Sony would apply the tagline "Play, Create, Share" to their racing game, ModNation Racers. While it was not as successful as LittleBigPlanet, other games such as Trials, Planet Minigolf, and Joe Danger would follow suit in applying the same philosophy. Other games in the genre include Minecraft and Super Mario Maker. After distancing themselves from the LittleBigPlanet franchise, Media Molecule developed Dreams, which further expanded upon game creation.

=== Franchise ===
Sackboy became a mascot for Sony. Media Molecule and Sony initially indicated that there were no plans to create a traditional sequel to LittleBigPlanet. Alex Evans said he did not want to ship a traditional sequel because of the "huge emotional investment" users have made in LittleBigPlanet. Game creators focused on "expand[ing] the game without partitioning the audience" to preserve the user-generated content from LBP. LittleBigPlanet would eventually spawn many follow-ups. Metacritic reported that most of the follow-ups received positive reviews. The exceptions were Sackboy's Prehistoric Moves, LittleBigPlanet Karting, and Run Sackboy! Run!, which received "mixed or average reviews".

In February 2009, Sony announced a spin-off of LittleBigPlanet for the PlayStation Portable, developed by SCE Studio Cambridge and Media Molecule, which was released in November 2009. Media Molecule announced in May 2010 that LittleBigPlanet 2 was in development, amid rumours. Sackboy's Prehistoric Moves, a demo of LittleBigPlanet 2 meant to introduce PlayStation Move, was released on January 18, 2010. The sequel was released in January 2011. A second spin-off for the PlayStation Vita was announced alongside the PlayStation Vita, then known as "Next Generation Portable", in January 2011. The game, titled LittleBigPlanet PS Vita, would be developed in conjunction between Tarsier Studios and Double Eleven, and was released in September 2012. A racing spin-off titled LittleBigPlanet Karting was rumoured to have been announced at a retailer event hosted by Sony in February 2012. It was confirmed by Sony the same month. The game was primarily developed by United Front Games, with Media Molecule serving as a supporting developer, and was released in November 2012.

A direct sequel to LittleBigPlanet 2, developed by Sumo Digital, was announced in June 2014 at Electronic Entertainment Expo. With the exception of during early development, Media Molecule was largely uninvolved in LittleBigPlanet 3, as they were working on Tearaway and Dreams at the time, and Media Molecule wanted to "step away" from the franchise. The game was released in November 2014 for PlayStation 3 and PlayStation 4. In September 2014, a free to play, endless running game spin-off developed by Firesprite, titled Run Sackboy! Run!, was announced. It was released in October 2014 for the Android and iOS, and on March 31, 2015, for the PlayStation Vita. After a hiatus, Sackboy: A Big Adventure, a 3D platform game developed by Sumo Digital, was announced in June 2020 at Sony's Future of Gaming event. Unlike most of the previous games, it does not feature a Create Mode akin to the previous games. It was released in November 2020 for the PlayStation 4 and PlayStation 5.

== See also ==
- List of best-selling PlayStation 3 video games
