= LittleBigPlanet Karting =

2012 video game

- Packaging artwork released for all territories
- Developers: United Front Games; San Diego Studio
- Publisher: Sony Computer Entertainment
- Composer: Winifred Phillips
- Series: LittleBigPlanet
- Platform: PlayStation 3
- Release: NA: 6 November 2012; EU: 7 November 2012; AU: 8 November 2012
- Genre: Kart racing
- Modes: Single-player, multiplayer

LittleBigPlanet Karting is a 2012 kart racing video game developed by United Front Games and San Diego Studio and published by Sony Computer Entertainment for the PlayStation 3. It is a spin-off of the LittleBigPlanet series, the third LittleBigPlanet game to be released on the console and the fifth entry overall. Unlike the previous LittleBigPlanet games, which were puzzle-platformers, LittleBigPlanet Karting focuses on kart racing.

The game was released between 6 and 8 November 2012. The game received mixed-to-positive reviews from critics.

== Gameplay ==
LittleBigPlanet Karting includes the series grappling hook mechanic during races.

LittleBigPlanet Karting is a racing game in which the players race against each other in a go-kart across a variety of themed tracks, with the primary purpose to come in first place. Throughout the course of the race, players can pick up Weaponators; power-ups that have special abilities such as projectiles, heat-seeking projectiles, EMPs, and grenades. The player can use these weapons to attack and slow down competitors. Weapons can be fired both forwards and backwards and can even cancel out seeker missiles when fired in reverse. Players can also pick up boost items such as Autopilot and Fast Forward. Karting includes LittleBigPlanet 2's grappling hook mechanic during races. Players are required to grapple across large expanses, climbing through the environment to progress and occasionally even finding elevated shortcuts. Players have the ability to reach out and slap somebody, stunning racers who get too close.

Karting has an emphasis on modes unlike traditional circuit racing, like Battle Mode, Waypoint Races, Treasure Hunts, Score Attacks and more. The Battle Mode, an eight-player arena battle, whereby players fight it out in an arena style vehicular combat match, is where players can pick up Weaponators in the arena and use them to hit other players and earn points.

As with most other games in the LittleBigPlanet series, user-generated content plays a pivotal role in the game's gameplay style using the series' "Play, Create, Share" motto. Users can customize their Sackboy as well as their karts and create their own tracks, which may extend to having genres other than just racing. The track editor allows users to adjust and create their own game rules, weapons, and tracks, and subsequently share them online through the PlayStation Network for other users to download and play. If the default AI is bothersome, users are able to tweak that as well. All tracks and modes have asynchronous multiplayer, even those tracks made by users.

=== Create mode ===
LittleBigPlanet Karting features a level editor, similar to the ModNation Racers editor. LittleBigPlanet Karting's create mode uses the same concept of LittleBigPlanet, featuring a menu similar to LittleBigPlanet's signature Popit menu to access objects and materials, plus other tools. It also features Play, Rewind, and Undo options to test creations, undo an unwanted action, or redo an undone action. Compared to previous entries, the game features a more robust, three-dimensional space. The player can choose "Create Track and Arena" from their Popit menu to create an arena or track and also specify what texture they want the track to be made out of. Terrain allows players to create lakes, ditches, and landforms in complex shapes, plus change the terrain material.

The Tools Bag contains themes, sound effects, music, and various tools to use in a level. The Goodies Bag contains Materials, pre-built objects from story levels, objects obtained from the community and objects created by the player using the Capture Object tool. Stickers and Decorations contain Stickers and Decorations collected during story mode to use in your levels, as well as pictures that players can take using the in-game camera tool or the PlayStation Eye Camera. It also contains stickers collected in community levels and taken with the Snapshot Camera. Global Controls allows players to change the lighting, water, fog, audio reverb.

=== Interface ===
The Pod has been expanded into a large, cardboard spaceship, where the Sackboy and the cart can be customised.

LittleBigPlanet's trademark Pod is the game's hub, though it has been expanded into a large, cardboard spaceship, with which the player travels between the game's various modes. Inside the Pod, the player's Sackperson can be customized, as can the cart, frames, wheels, and paintjob. Any in-game object can be turned into a weapon, or objects can be "painted" into the game for more talented and patient artists.

== Plot ==
The game takes place immediately after the events of LittleBigPlanet 2. The Story Mode features Sackboy racing against The Hoard, who are planning to steal the Imagisphere's prizes for "no reason other than to hoard them." Players begin the story mode by hopping into a cart which had been crashed by a member of The Hoard and takes off after them to reclaim the stolen prizes. Sackboy races through many places ransacked by the hoard. The Sackbots aid him in his quest.

The adventure begins with the Queen asking Sackboy to clear the Hoard from the Gardens, Wedding and Canyons. Afterward, Sackboy travels to a tropical beach-like planet known as the Monster Islands, where a local named Ray the Turtle asks for help locating the legendary Huge Monster. By the time they find her, they discover that the Hoard have stolen her egg, so Sackboy must take it back. The Hoard also attempts to steal "brainergy" and pastries from Victoria's Laboratory (now a separate planet).

In the process of stealing, Hoard mess with the technology on the futuristic theme park planet Progress Emporium. On Eve's Asylum, Venus the Flytrap warns Sackboy that the Hoard are unintentionally summoning evil forces (such as the flaming centipede that threatens to burn down the planet and its inhabitants) as they steal more things.

Finally, Sackboy visits Avalonia, where the brother of Avalon Centrifuge from LittleBigPlanet 2, Captain Sirius Oculus, invites Sackboy and the Hoard to a party on his nightclub space station, the Space Bass. Soon, however, the entire Space Bass, along with Captain Sirius, is sucked into a nearby anomaly known as the Funkhole, which leads to the "Garage at The End of the Universe" where the Hoard stash their collection. After Sackboy defeats a giant monster that arises from the dump, the Hoard redeem their mistake and decide not to hoard anymore. The planet explodes and scatters the Hoard's stuff all over the Wonderplane.

== Development ==
"Our goal with LittleBigPlanet Karting has been fairly simple – provide a fast-paced experience that captures the best of classic karting gameplay, married with the unbridled creativity of LBP. This new adventure will be accessible to players of all ages and have all of the variety necessary to satisfy both the hardcore and more casual players."

— James Grieve, Senior Producer at United Front Games

Reports of a kart racing game for PlayStation 3 called LittleBigPlanet Karting surfaced following a Sony retailer event in February 2012. No information had been publicly released by the publisher other than confirmation that the game is in development. Numerous reports from the Destination PlayStation event indicated that the game would be released alongside a PlayStation Move steering wheel peripheral and would be 3D-capable.

LittleBigPlanet Karting was officially confirmed by Sony with an official announcement on 22 March 2012. Media Molecule Studio Director, Siobhan Reddy, stated "With LittleBigPlanet's powerful and diverse toolset in [United Front Games] capable hands, LittleBigPlanet Karting is sure to be an adventure that both LittleBigPlanet fans and kart racing fans alike will enjoy!" Reports of 3D and PlayStation Move support from the Destination PlayStation event were confirmed.

Even though LittleBigPlanet Karting carries all the signs of a simple spinoff, it's actually a brand-new game with a more expansive 3D world, as well as a brand-new engine. Senior Producer, Kyle Zundel, stated that gamers can expect more than a ModNation Racers game starring Sackboy. "LittleBigPlanet Karting offers more karting modes than ModNation Racers, including a Battle Mode and open arena Waypoint Racing. In addition, the LittleBigPlanet Karting level editor allows players to create more than just tracks; creators can modify game rules, create weapons, and more."

Design Director at United Front Games, William Ho, stated that the game is "the sort of game that appeals to kids", including the kid buried in most grown-up gamers. "I think Kart racers appeal to the kid in everyone," William Ho told reporters. "There's a universality to driving around in a go kart in fantastic places – and there's a universality to the materials in LittleBigPlanet."

In May 2012, William Ho stated there were no immediate plans for a PlayStation Vita version of LittleBigPlanet Karting as "We are concentrating 100% on making the PS3 version LittleBigPlanet Karting the very best it can be".

=== Online servers ===
It was announced that LittleBigPlanet Karting would shut down on 2 July 2018, along with ModNation Racers following after on 10 July 2018. ModNation Racers would later receive a 3-month extension, with the shutdown date being changed to 10 October 2018.

Previously, the online functionality for LittleBigPlanet Karting was planned to shut down on 31 August 2016, alongside announcements to end online support for all LittleBigPlanet titles in Japan.

=== Marketing ===
Sony collaborated with several retail outlets on several pre-order incentive. In North America, the pre-order bonus consisted of the "Kevin Butler Pack", which includes a Kevin Butler-themed Sackboy costume and an Executive Golf Kart. Those who pre-ordered at GameStop received the "Headstart Pack", which unlocks over 900 items – karts, costumes, materials, and music. Also for GameStop pre-orders, customers received a United Front Games General Costume and an Arcade Cabinet Kart.

In Europe, the availability varied by retailer and locale. One of the two pre-order bonus consisted of the "Game Maker Pack". With this, the Sackboy can dress up as a racing car driver, as a mascot of United Front Games or as PlayStation VP Kevin Butler (despite the character never being used in Europe). It also includes a racing car kart, arcade machine kart and executive golf buggy kart. The other pre-order bonus, "Headstart Pack", unlocks over 900 items – karts, costumes, materials, and music.

Exclusive to Europe, a Special Edition of the game comes with a lenticular 3D cover. It also includes both pre-order packs ("Game Maker's Pack" and "Headstart Pack").

==== Beta phases ====
The LittleBigPlanet Karting beta began on 10 July 2012, for a selected number of players who had opted-in to receive codes on a specific European LittleBigPlanet Karting beta sign-up page, and more vouchers were dispersed as the beta continued through 31 July. On 19 June, Sony opened the beta for European PlayStation Plus subscribers from 3 pm UK and lasted for 24 hours.

== Reception ==
Reception

Aggregate scores
Aggregator	Score
GameRankings	73.62%
Metacritic	73/100

Review scores
Publication	Score
Destructoid	6.5/10
Edge	8/10
Eurogamer	6/10
G4	4/5
Game Informer	8/10
GameRevolution	4/5
GamesMaster	60%
GameSpot	7/10
GamesRadar+	4/5
GameTrailers	6.8/10
IGN	5/10
PlayStation Official Magazine – UK	8/10
Polygon	7/10
VideoGamer.com	7/10
NZGamer.com	9.4/10
PlayStation Universe	9/10

LittleBigPlanet Karting received "mixed or average" reviews from critics. Aggregate review websites GameRankings and Metacritic gave LittleBigPlanet Karting 73.62% and 73/100 respectively.

Kyle Hilliard from Game Informer gave LittleBigPlanet Karting 8/10, and stated "A fun racer that almost feels more like a LittleBigPlanet game than it does a kart racer." Lorenzo Veloria from GamesRadar gave it 4/5, stating "Karting does a great job of mixing franchises' creative features and delivering strong racing gameplay to make one of the most adorable and enjoyable kart racers you can find."

Hadyn Green from NZGamer gave LittleBigPlanet Karting a 9.4/10, and stated "The stupid grins on our faces, the uncontrollable laughs and the humming of the music long after the race was over, show that this game is fun right through to its adorable little core." Mike Jackson from Machinima.com gave the game a 9/10, saying "...the solid racing core laid out by ModNation Racers combined with the universe of creativity, variety and charm that the LBP franchise is known for makes for a karting game with near limitless potential and unrivaled multiplayer racing fun."

Tom Orry from VideoGamer gave the game 7/10, and stated "Play it, mess around with its tools, and have fun, but LittleBigPlanet Karting's lack of personality will result in no long-lasting impression." Greg Miller from IGN gave Karting 5/10, stating "The game pulls from both the LittleBigPlanet and ModNation Racers universes without ever finding its own voice."

Phil Iwaniuk from Official PlayStation Magazine (UK) gave it 8/10, and stated "What it might lack in terms of raw driving appeal, LBP Karting compensates for with a charmingly unhinged single-player, chaotic multiplayer and all the customisable bells and whistles you could ask for."

James Stephanie Sterling, writing for Destructoid, gave it 6.5/10, stating "It's not a bad game by any stretch of the imagination, and can even manage to be quite fun in the right environment, but it's altogether a fairly meaningless release that seems to exist just to ensure Sony has something out in time for the holiday season that isn't PlayStation All-Stars Battle Royale.

Steven Williamson from PSU.com was more positive, stating that it had a "great art style, impressive track design, competitive racing and infinite replay value", giving it a 9/10.

Despite the mixed reception, the Academy of Interactive Arts & Sciences nominated LittleBigPlanet Karting for "Racing Game of the Year" during the 16th Annual D.I.C.E. Awards.
