= Miller-Motte College =

American private technical college system

Coordinates: 36.84066°N 76.13273°W

Miller-Motte College, formerly Miller-Motte Technical College, is a university system of private for-profit technical colleges throughout the southeastern United States. Its parent company is Ancora Education.

== History ==
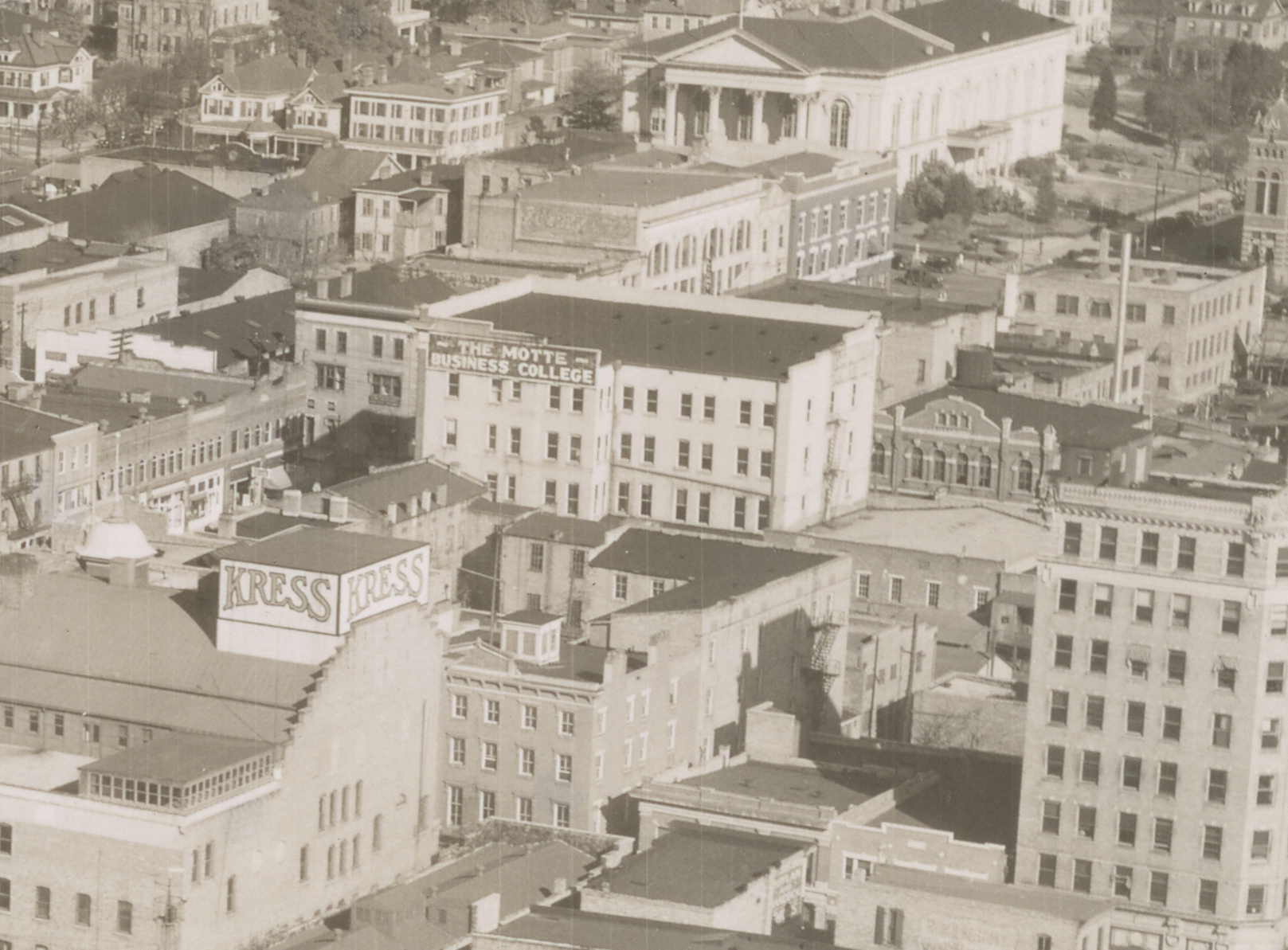
1930s aerial view of downtown Wilmington. Motte Business College, then located near the intersection of 2nd and Princess streets, is at center.

Miller-Motte was founded in 1916, in Wilmington, North Carolina, as a small training facility for courtroom stenographers. Over the years, the college established other campuses in Tennessee, North Carolina, South Carolina, Virginia, and Georgia.

In 1998, the school was acquired by Delta Career Education Corporation It was sold to Ancora Education in 2018.

== Accreditation ==
Miller-Motte is accredited by the Accrediting Commission of Career Schools and Colleges as branch campuses of Platt College in Tulsa, Oklahoma. The Medical Assisting and Surgical Technology programs offered at several campuses are accredited by the Commission on Accreditation of Allied Health Education Programs (www.caahep.org) upon the recommendation of the Medical Assisting Education Review Board (MAERB)

It was formerly accredited by the Accrediting Council for Independent Colleges and Schools (ACICS). In 2015, Miller-Motte's retention standards were 54 percent, slightly increasing to 56 percent by 2016. Due to these retention rates, the Accrediting Council for Independent Colleges and Schools (ACICS) withdrew approval for Miller-Motte's paralegal program in 2017 and placed its Criminal Justice Bachelor of Science program on "show cause" status for the same reason. The United States Secretary of Education terminated ACICS' accrediting status in 2022.

== Campus locations ==
Miller-Motte College operates campuses in seven cities: Augusta, Georgia, Chattanooga, Tennessee, Columbus, Georgia, Fayetteville, North Carolina, Jacksonville, North Carolina, Raleigh, North Carolina, and Tulsa, Oklahoma.

In August 2009, Miller-Motte College launched its Bachelor of Science degree completion program, Miller-Motte College Online.
