= ModNation Racers: Road Trip =

2012 video game

- North American box art
- Developer: San Diego Studio
- Publisher: Sony Computer Entertainment
- Series: ModNation Racers
- Platform: PlayStation Vita
- Release: NA: February 15, 2012; EU: February 22, 2012; AU: February 23, 2012
- Genre: Kart racing
- Modes: Single-player, multiplayer

ModNation Racers: Road Trip is a 2012 kart racing video game developed by San Diego Studio and published by Sony Computer Entertainment for the PlayStation Vita. It is the sequel to ModNation Racers. On July 1, 2017, Sony Interactive Entertainment terminated the online functionality for the game.

== Gameplay ==
Gameplay is similar to its predecessor on the PlayStation 3. Players are able to accelerate and drift, successful drifts allow players to fill their boost meter. The meter resembles a multi-tiered thermometer which allows players to the choice of activating a turbo boost to increase the kart's speed or a shield to protect their kart from incoming attacks. Players are able to collect weapons as they race which can be upgraded to up to three levels of power, weapons include sonic attacks, missiles and lightning strikes. New weapons are available in ModNation Racers: Road Trip bringing a total of seven types. The game also includes ad-hoc mode.

== Reception ==
Reception

Aggregate score
Aggregator	Score
Metacritic	62/100

Review scores
Publication	Score
The A.V. Club	B
Destructoid	3/10
Electronic Gaming Monthly	5.5/10
Eurogamer	7/10
Game Informer	7/10
GameRevolution	5/10
GameSpot	6/10
GameTrailers	6.9/10
GameZone	6/10
IGN	7/10
Pocket Gamer	2.5/5
PlayStation: The Official Magazine	6/10
Push Square	7/10
The Guardian	3/5
Metro	3/10

ModNation Racers: Road Trip received "mixed" reviews, according to the review aggregation website Metacritic.

James Stephanie Sterling of Destructoid criticized its lack of content, writing, "...ModNation Racers: Road Trip is about as shamelessly rushed and sloppily executed as any spin-off you can imagine." Eurogamer and GamesRadar+ thought that the game lacked soul. Eurogamer also liked the customization and controls, concluding, "...Road Trip is a surprisingly enjoyable instalment nonetheless. It's colourful, cheerful and a decent showcase for Sony's brand new hardware." Game Informer did not recommend the game due to its lack of online multiplayer and criticized the chaotic design of the tracks, writing, "The later tracks, while impressive on a technical and creative level, are packed with so many obstacles and pitfalls that races devolve into chaos. This pandemonium is compounded by the worst rubberband AI I've ever seen..." while going on to praise the utilization of the touch and handheld controls. IGN disliked the load times, as well as some technical issues, writing, "Yes, the courses are tougher and as beautiful as ever, but the game stumbles at showcasing that. The framerate drops regularly when the action is intense. It doesn't become unplayable, but it certainly doesn't look silky smooth." Pocket Gamer similarly took issue with its lack of content, technical issues, and chaotic gameplay, and wrote, "ModNation Racers: Road Trip...is not only inferior to the home console release but also to the PSP offering." GameRevolution similarly wrote negatively, stating, "Despite the well-executed customization suite and some entertaining gameplay, it feels like too many good ideas were buried under mountains and mountains of [bad ideas] you never asked for and you'll never use." GameSpot adored the first half of the campaign, robust creation and sharing suite, and the tone, while lamenting the long load times, chaotic races, and lack of online multiplayer. G4TV gave it 3.5 out of 5, saying that none of the gripes "would kill anyone's enjoyment of the game, but given the lack of multiplayer, and the weak single-player, ModNation Racers: Road Trip is a huge missed opportunity for the casual fan, but the mod-tools are strong enough to appeal to the already converted fan of the franchise."
