= McCann School of Business & Technology =

Coordinates: 40.6401°N 75.4489°W

McCann School of Business & Technology is a for-profit technical school with campuses in Monroe, Louisiana, Allentown, Pennsylvania, Lewisburg, Pennsylvania. It is accredited by the Accrediting Commission of Career Schools and Colleges.

== History ==
McCann School of Business was founded by Louis C. McCann. His sons, Dwight and Charles, entered the field and held administrative positions at the Mahanoy City campus and branch schools later established. After the death of Dwight McCann in 1956, Mrs. Dorothy Houser began serving as director. In 1959, Mrs. Houser purchased the school in partnership with her husband, Harry D. Houser.

In 1970, McCann became accredited by the Accrediting Commission of the Association of Independent Colleges and Schools of Washington, D.C.

A change of ownership occurred in 1981 when the school was purchased by James and Elizabeth Noone. John E. Noone became president and Owner of the school in 1994.

In 1995, the school opened a new school branch in Pottsville, Pennsylvania.

The third campus of McCann commenced operation in September, 1998, in downtown Sunbury, Northumberland County. The school provided business training in the county, and in the neighboring counties of Montour, Snyder, and Union. The campus moved to the North 4th Street Plaza in early 2003, replacing the Ames Department Store.

In August 2002, McCann Education Centers, Inc. was purchased by Delta Educational Systems, Inc., which later became Delta Career Education Corporation in 2006. Delta is headquartered in Virginia Beach, Virginia and owns schools in Arizona, Georgia, Louisiana, Mississippi, North Carolina, Ohio, Pennsylvania, South Carolina, Tennessee, and Virginia.

In July 2005, the Mahanoy City campus was relocated to its new home in Humboldt Industrial Park, in Hazle Township. In April 2008, the school opened a new branch in Dickson City, Lackawanna County. In April 2009, the school opened a new branch in Allentown, Lehigh County and later that year, opened another in Carlisle, PA. On February 9, 2012, the Wilkes-Barre campus was introduced. In January 2016, the Sunbury campus moved to Lewisburg in a newly renovated shopping plaza.

In January 2018, the McCann School of Business & Technology campuses in Allentown, PA, Lewisburg, PA and Monroe LA were acquired by STVT-AAI Education Inc. dba Ancora Education. McCann voluntarily withdrew from accreditation with ACICS and received accreditation by the Accrediting Commission of Career Schools and Colleges (ACCSC) as branch campuses of Platt College in Tulsa, OK. In March 2021, the ACCSC main campus was re-designated from Platt-College Tulsa to Miller-Motte College in Chattanooga.
