= Jerry Lambert (actor) =

American actor

- Born: August 8, 1957 (age 68); Shelton, Washington, U.S.
- Occupation: Actor
- Years active: 1989–present

Jerry Lambert (born August 8, 1957) is an American stage, film, and television actor and voiceover artist. He is known for appearing in television commercials for companies such as GEICO, Holiday Inn, and Bridgestone. He also played fictional Sony executive Kevin Butler, and has appeared in commercials for Canadian restaurant chain Boston Pizza. His other television credits include the shows Sons & Daughters and Neighbors from Hell; he also had a recurring role on the ABC sitcom American Housewife.

== Early life and education ==
Lambert was born in Shelton, Washington. He graduated from Montesano High School in Montesano in 1975. He graduated from Mount Hood College near Portland and from the American Academy of Dramatic Arts in New York City. He began his theatrical career performing in plays in New York while continuing classes. He studied improvisation and sketch comedy at Acme Comedy Theatre in Hollywood and Chicago City Limits in New York.

== Career ==
Lambert made his film debut in Alien Space Avenger in 1989. He has appeared in episodes of Shameless, Everybody Loves Raymond, Scare Tactics, King of the Hill, Greek, The West Wing, Sons & Daughters, Malcolm in the Middle, That '70s Show, Angel, Maron and was in the movie Smother starring Diane Keaton, along with the drama 44 Minutes: The North Hollywood Shoot-Out starring Michael Madsen and Ron Livingston.

Lambert is a member of Circus Theatricals in Los Angeles, where he appeared in Richard III with Alfred Molina. He has also performed in his own plays Straight Talk, Lipstick Sunset and Coffee to Go.

In 2010, he completed a television pilot for Fox Television with John Goodman and Justin Bartha called The Station (produced by Ben Stiller and directed by David Wain). He had a recurring role on the TBS adult-oriented animated series Neighbors from Hell in the same year .

He portrayed Kevin Butler in the Sony PlayStation 3 "It Only Does Everything" commercials (now known as Long Live Play), as vice-president of a different fictional department in each commercial. He appeared live for a short comedic performance at Sony's E3 2010 conference.

In 2011, Lambert appeared in Bad Teacher. In 2014, he was in Horrible Bosses 2. In 2016, appeared as the anchor of fictional Your 7 News in News Hits, a special aired on Adult Swim Infomercials.

Between 2017 and 2021, he had a recurring role as Principal Michael Ablin on the ABC sitcom American Housewife.
