= Delta Career Education Corporation =

American company

- Motto: Changing futures. Changing Lives.
- Type: For-profit
- Established: 1998
- CEO: John Olsen
- Administrative staff: 2,685
- Undergraduates: 16,000
- Location: Alexandria, Virginia, United States
- Campus: Urban
- Locations: 35 campuses & learning centers, online
- Website: deltaed.com

Delta Career Education Corporation was a Virginia-based for-profit institution of higher learning that declared bankruptcy in 2018. Twenty one of its campuses were sold to Ancora Education. It was a wholly owned subsidiary of Gryphon Investors, through Gryphon Colleges Corporation (GCC).

== History ==
Delta was founded in February 1998 by Joseph A. Kennedy. Delta's first acquisition, in February 1998, was Miller-Motte Business College, with campuses in Clarksville, TN, Wilmington, NC, and Lynchburg, VA. Delta later purchased Career Training Specialists in Monroe, Louisiana. In September 2000, Miller-Motte Business Colleges and Career Training Specialists changed their names to Miller-Motte Technical College and Career Technical College, respectively. In December of that year, Miller-Motte launched a new branch campus in Charleston, South Carolina.

=== Expansion ===
In August 2002, Delta acquired the McCann School of Business and Technology, a school that was founded in 1897 and operates campuses in Carlisle, Allentown, Pottsville, Sunbury, Dickson City, and Hazleton, Pennsylvania. The Mahanoy City branch of McCann moved to Hazleton in May 2005. In September 2002, Delta purchased The Creative Circus, a school for advertising (copywriting and art direction), graphic design, photography, and interactive development, and opened a branch campus of Miller-Motte Technical College in Chattanooga, Tennessee.

In November 2003 Delta acquired Miami-Jacobs Career College, a school that was founded in 1860 and operates in Dayton, Ohio. A second Miami-Jacobs location opened in Springboro, Ohio in July 2005, and a third location opened in Troy, Ohio in February 2007.

Delta Education opened several additional branch locations in 2004 and 2005. Miller-Motte Technical College opened in Raleigh, North Carolina in October 2004, Career Technical College in Shreveport, Louisiana opened in November 2004, and Miller-Motte Technical College in Nashville, Tennessee opened in May 2005. The Nashville school is Delta Education's first school to offer courses in Heating and Air Conditioning, Welding, and Electrician.

In May 2006, Delta was once again re-capitalized by Gryphon Investors, through Gryphon Colleges Corporation. Gryphon Investors is a $700 million San Francisco-based private equity fund that focuses on leveraged acquisitions of growth investments in middle market companies in partnership with experienced management teams that run them. Gryphon Colleges Corporation was formed at the end of 2004 by Gryphon Investors through the acquisition of National Career Education (NCE), a four campus school (Lamson College, National Career Education, Institute For Business and Technology, Tucson College) company located in Arizona and California. In June 2007 Lamson Institute opened in San Antonio, Texas.

On August 3, 2006, Delta acquired The Academy of Court Reporting (ACR), a school that was founded in the 1970s and operates in the following cities in Ohio: Cleveland, Akron, Columbus, Cincinnati, as well as in Clawson, Michigan and Pittsburgh, Pennsylvania.

In March 2008, Delta Acquired its 10th school brand, Berks Technical Institute (BTI) in Wyomissing, PA. BTI, located in southeastern Pennsylvania, was founded in 1982 and is home to over 700 students. The 8th Miller-Motte campus was opened in Raleigh, NC in July 2008 followed by the Greenville, NC branch in March 2009, Fayetteville in November 2009 and Conway, SC in March 2010.

=== Collapse ===
In 2018, Ancora Education acquired Delta Career Education Corporation properties as it was facing bankruptcy. This included campuses of the Berks Technical Institute, McCann School of Business and Technology, Miller-Motte College, Miller-Motte Technical College, Creative Circus and International Schools. Seventeen of those campuses became branches of Platt College.
