= The Creative Circus =

Private, for-profit college in Atlanta

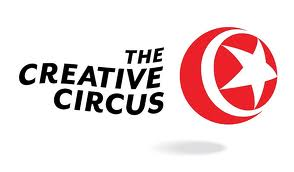
- Creativecircus
- Type: Private for-profit college
- Established: 1995
- Location: Atlanta, Georgia, United States
- Mascot: Freaks
- Website: www.creativecircus.edu

The Creative Circus was a private for-profit college in Atlanta, Georgia. It was founded in 1995 and offers education in creative advertising, interactive development, design, and photography. The college closed in 2023.

== History ==
- The Creative Circus was founded in 1995.
- In September, 2002 the school was acquired by the Delta Career Education Corporation.

== Accreditation ==
The Creative Circus is accredited by the Council of Occupational Education.
