= Serpents in Aztec art =

Serpent sculptures made by Aztecs

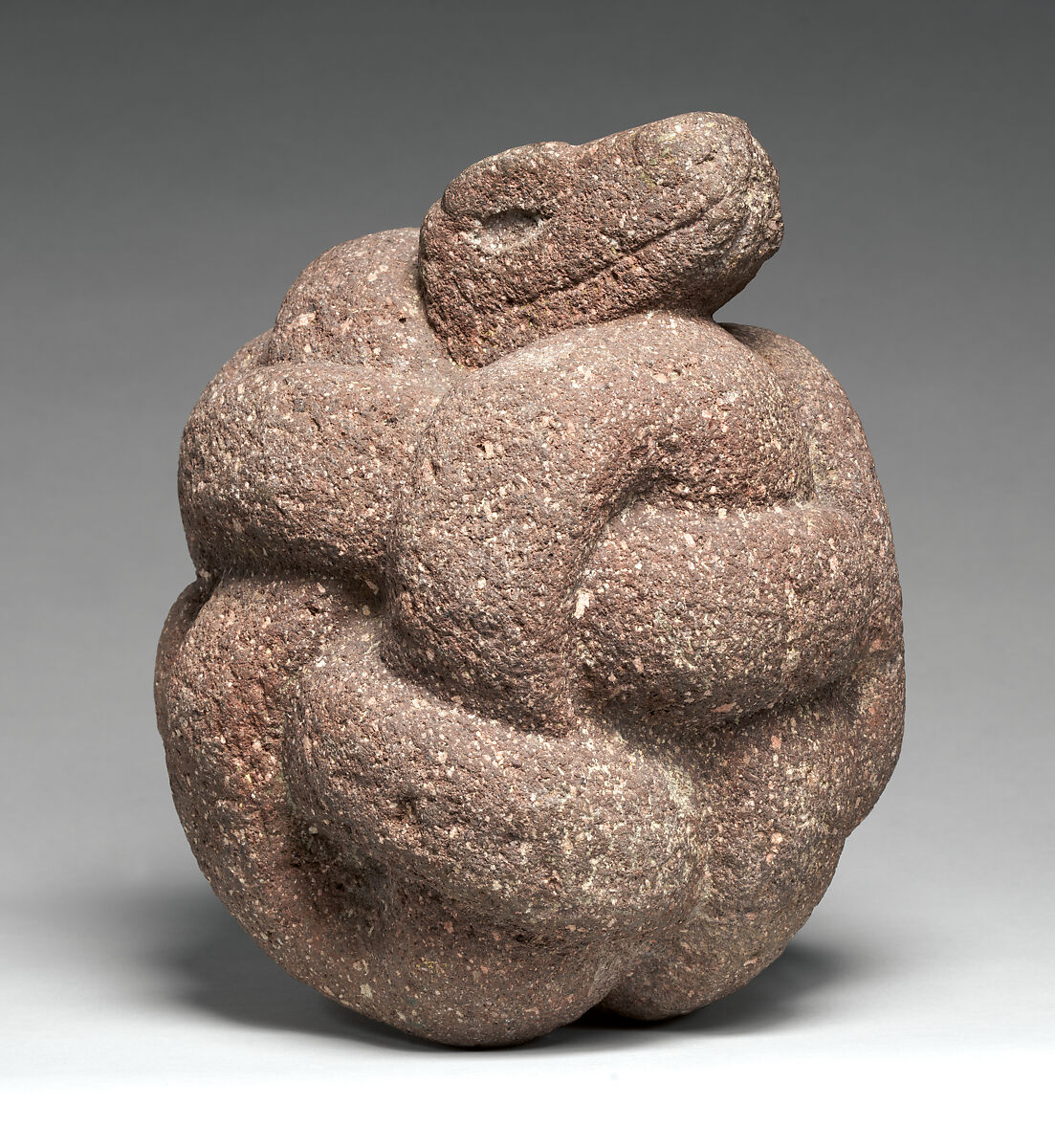
Coiled Serpent, unknown Aztec artist, 15th–early 16th century CE, Stone, The Metropolitan Museum of Art, New York, United States

The use of serpents in Aztec art ranges greatly from being an inclusion in the iconography of important religious figures such as Quetzalcoatl and Cōātlīcue, to being used as symbols on Aztec ritual objects, and decorative stand-alone representations which adorned the walls of monuments such as the Templo Mayor.

== Background ==
Snakes likely began to be revered symbols as early as 2000 BCE in Mesoamerican societies due to their extreme mobility. Since snakes are able swim in water, slither on and burrow through earth, and perch in trees above ground, they were viewed as the only animals able to transcend all earthly realms. This ability is what launched the snake as a spiritual animal, as many local religions were centered around serpentine gods and deities.

Due to the snake’s process of molting, serpents became most closely associated with the process of rebirth and fertility in Aztec cultural symbolism. This symbolic connection was not exclusive to humans and other animals, but the earth's fertility in agricultural practices as well. The snake was a symbol of blood and rain due to the liquid nature of its movement, two "life-giving" liquids which allowed for humans and animals to survive and plants to grow.

== Mythological Creatures, Deities, and Gods ==
=== Chicomecōātl ===
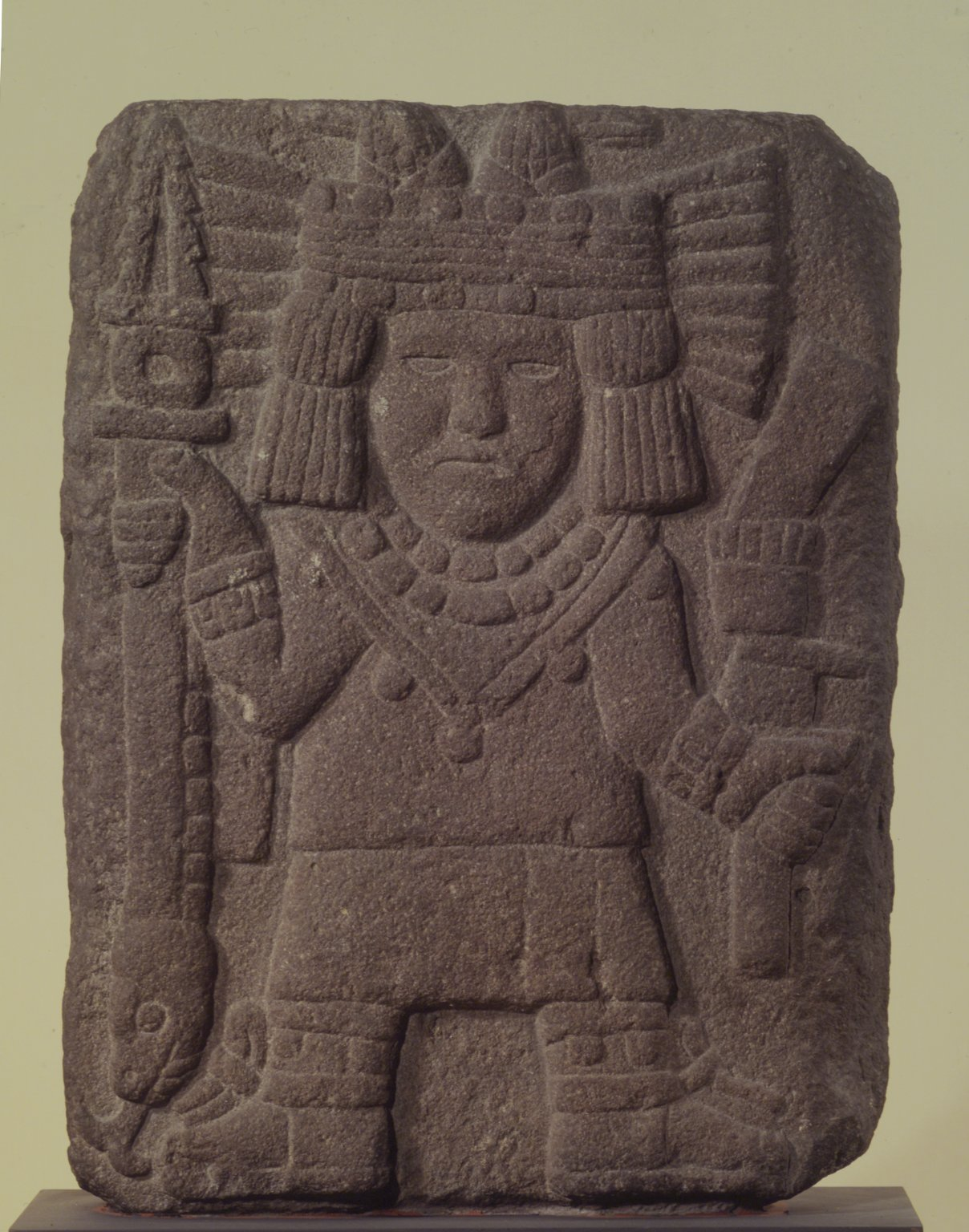
Relief with Maize Goddess (Chicomecóatl), unknown Aztec artist, 1440-1521 CE, Stone, Brooklyn Museum, Brooklyn, United States

Chicomecōātl, or "Seven Serpent", was an important Aztec agricultural goddess who served as a symbol of both human and plant reproduction. Her most common iconographic features includes corn, which is often being held in her hands, and an amacalli, or "paper house" which is worn as a headdress. It is not uncommon for Chicomecōātl to be seen carrying a chicahuaztli, or "rattle-stick". Rattle-sticks were percussion instruments used in exclusively agricultural rituals to penetrate the earth and call for rain, thus fertilizing the soil for a more bountiful harvest. While rattle-sticks were only used in ceremonies, a frame of the Codex Borgia plate 9 depicts a man and woman beneath a blanket with a chicahuaztli between them. This is one of the many examples of serpentine imagery that represents fertility in a way interchangeable between humans and plants. In the stone relief carving of Chicomecōātl from the Brooklyn Museum, the goddess can be seen holding a chicahuaztli shaped like a serpent in her right hand. The snake's tail is believed to be either a ray of sunlight or a phallic symbol. Regardless of what it may represent, both possibilities represent the fertilization and penetration of farmland. Small statues of Chicomecōātl are the most common divine artworks from the Aztec Empire as they were mass-produced as fertility idols and probably collected as household items. In some depictions, Chicomecōātl wears a snake belt, similar to fellow fertility goddess Cōālīcue.

=== Cōālīcue ===
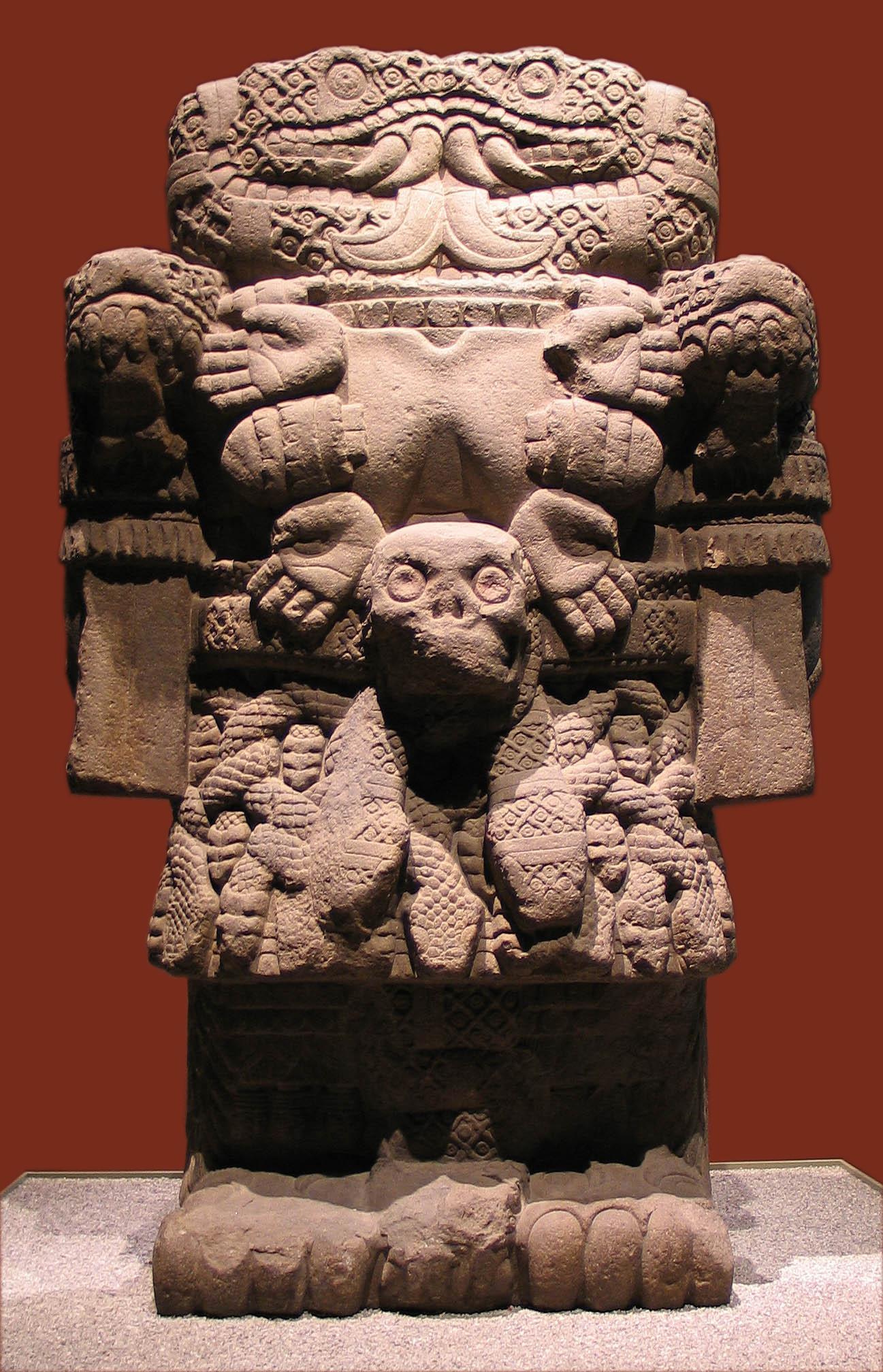
Coatlicue statue, unknown Aztec artist, 1439 or 1491, Andesite, National Museum of Anthropology, Mexico City, Mexico

Cōālīcue, or "Snakes-Her-Skirt", is an Aztec earth goddess who is known as the "mother of the gods". As her name suggests, the main iconographic trait of Cōālīcue is her skirt made of interwoven snakes. Some representations of her, such as the Coatlicue statue from the National Museum of Anthropology in Mexico City, feature serpents coming from her head and arms. This detail falls in line with the story of Huitzilopochtli's birth and her subsequent sacrifice. The serpents which appear to be crawling from her severed head and arms represent blood; the properties of liquid are challenging to emulate in physical sculpture, thus Aztec sculptors adopted the snake as blood's symbol due to its movement, which resembles that of streaming liquid.

=== Quetzalcoatl ===
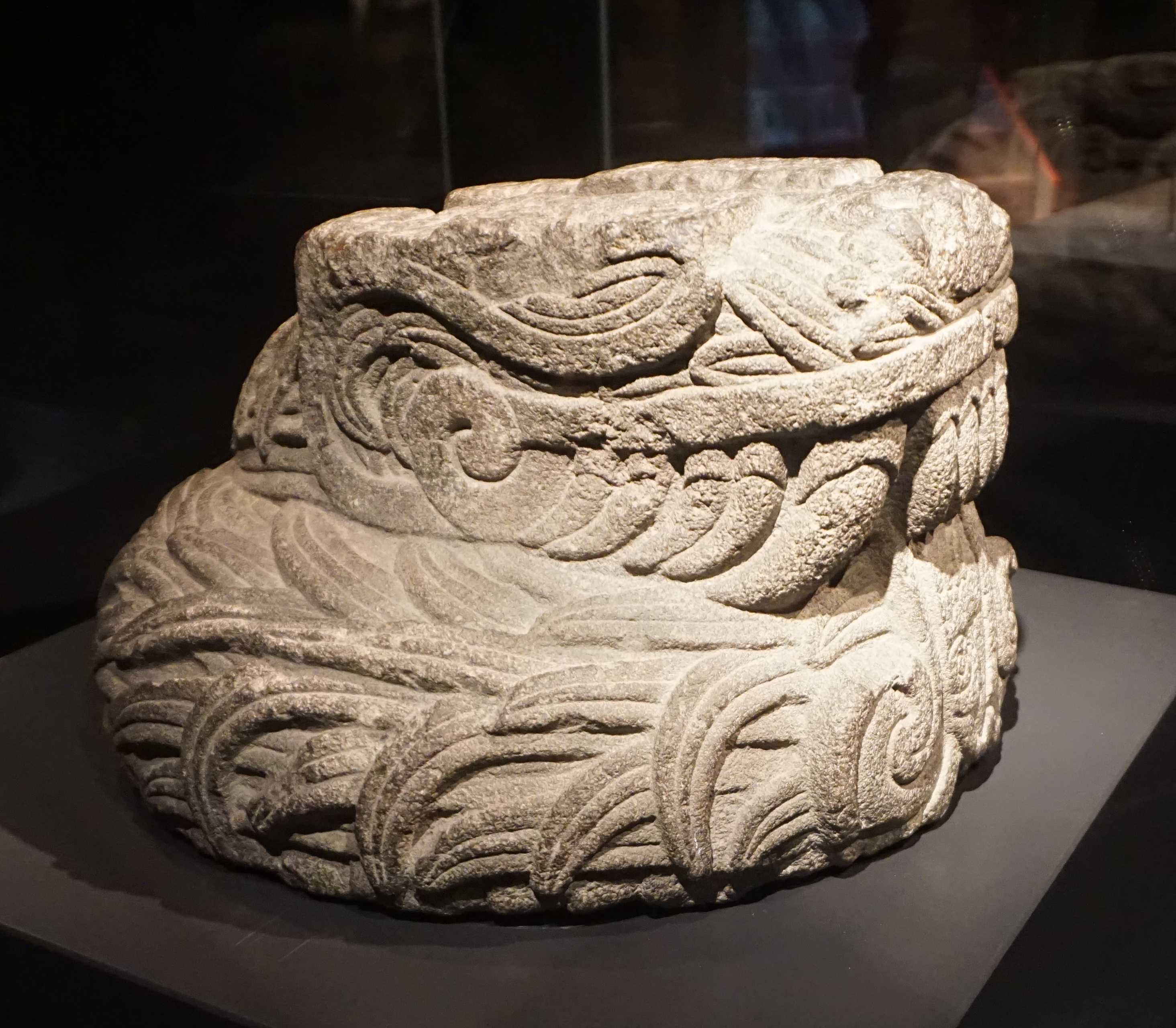
Feathered Serpent, unknown Aztec artist, early 16th century, stone, Museum der Kulturen, Basel, Switzerland

Quetzalcoatl, or "Feathered Serpent", was the patron god of Aztec priesthood and was related to the wind, Venus, the Sun, merchants, arts, crafts, knowledge, and learning. His artistic depictions varied greatly, but sculpturally, he was most often depicted as a coiled, feathered serpent.
