= United Front Games =

Canadian video game development studio

United Front Games, Inc.
- Type: Private
- Industry: Video games
- Founded: 2007; 19 years ago
- Defunct: October 17, 2016; 9 years ago
- Headquarters: Vancouver, British Columbia, Canada
- Key people: Stephen van der Mescht
- Products: ModNation Racers; Sleeping Dogs; LittleBigPlanet Karting
- Website: www.unitedfrontgames.com

United Front Games, Inc. was a Canadian video game development studio based in Vancouver. Active from 2007 to 2016, they were most known as the developers of ModNation Racers, and the critical and commercial success Sleeping Dogs, in addition to collaborating with other studios on projects like Tomb Raider: Definitive Edition, (Crystal Dynamics) and Halo: The Master Chief Collection (343 Industries).

Created in 2007, the studio consisted of former members of EA Black Box, Rockstar Vancouver, Radical Entertainment and Volition, all of which made video games with an open world setting. In 2016, United Front Games officially closed down.

== History ==
United Front Games was founded in 2007. Its first official title was ModNation Racers, a user-generated content kart racing game, which began production in 2008 and was released in May 2010. In August 2012, they released Sleeping Dogs. While it is widely believed that Sleeping Dogs was originally conceived as a title in the True Crime series, it was in fact built from the ground up as an original intellectual property. United Front Games also made LittleBigPlanet Karting with help from the series creators Media Molecule.

United Front Games also worked on the Xbox One version of Tomb Raider: Definitive Edition.

In early 2013, United Front began production on a sequel to Sleeping Dogs. Plans for the sequel were eventually scrapped in late 2013 before the project even went into production.

In October 2014, United Front released Sleeping Dogs for the PlayStation 4 and Xbox One called Sleeping Dogs: Definitive Edition. In September 2014, United Front Games announced Triad Wars, an online open world action-adventure game. Originally targeted for an early 2015 release on PC, Triad Wars was a game set in the Sleeping Dogs Hong Kong universe. However, in December 2015, United Front announced the January 2016 closure of the Triad Wars open beta. In collaboration with Microsoft Studios-owned developer 343 Industries, United Front Games developed the Halo: The Master Chief Collection compilation, published in November 2014.

On October 17, 2016, United Front Games announced closure even though their newest game Smash+Grab, an online multiplayer brawler, had only been out for less than a month on Steam Early Access. No further details were given by the studio regarding its closure.

== Games developed ==
Year	Title	Platform(s)								Notes
Year	Title	PS3	PS4	Win	OS X	X360	XOne	OnLive	WiiU	Notes
2010	ModNation Racers	Yes	No	No	No	No	No	No	No	PS3 version only.
2012	Sleeping Dogs	Yes	Yes	Yes	Yes	Yes	Yes	Yes	No	
2012	LittleBigPlanet Karting	Yes	No	No	No	No	No	No	No	
2014	Tomb Raider: Definitive Edition	No	Yes	No	No	No	Yes	No	No	
2014	Halo: The Master Chief Collection	No	No	Yes	No	No	Yes	No	No	Support studio for the Xbox One version.
2016	Disney Infinity 3.0 – Marvel Battlegrounds	Yes	Yes	Yes	No	Yes	Yes	No	Yes	
Cancelled	Sleeping Dogs 2	No	Yes	Yes	No	No	Yes	No	No	
Cancelled	Smash+Grab	No	No	Yes	No	No	No	No	No	
Cancelled	Triad Wars	No	No	Yes	No	No	No	No	No	
