= ModNation Racers =

2010 video game

- PAL region cover art for PlayStation 3
- Developers: San Diego Studio; United Front Games (PS3)
- Publisher: Sony Computer Entertainment
- Designer: Mat Thomas
- Writers: Philip Bache II; Nick Bennett; Meghan Heritage; Sam Riegel
- Composers: Jono Grant; Marc Baril; Peter Chapman
- Platforms: PlayStation 3 PlayStation Portable
- Release: PlayStation Portable: AU: May 19, 2010; EU: May 21, 2010; NA: May 24, 2010; PlayStation 3: AU: May 20, 2010; EU: May 21, 2010; NA: May 25, 2010
- Genre: Kart racing
- Modes: Single-player, multiplayer

ModNation Racers is a 2010 kart racing video game developed by United Front Games and San Diego Studio and published by Sony Computer Entertainment for the PlayStation 3 and PlayStation Portable. User generated content is a central aspect of the game, such that it uses the same "Play, Create, Share" adage as LittleBigPlanet to convey its basis in online user-generated content sharing and level creation tools.

A sequel, ModNation Racers: Road Trip, was released as a launch title for the PlayStation Vita in February 2012.

== Gameplay ==
Karts drifting during a race.

Players are able to accelerate and drift, successful drifts allow players to fill their boost meter. The meter resembles a multi-tiered thermometer which allows players to the choice of activating a turbo boost to increase the kart's speed, a shield to protect their kart from incoming attacks or sideswiping other racers. Players are able to collect weapons as they race which can be upgraded to up to three levels of power, weapons include sonic attacks, missiles and lightning strikes. For example, a first level sonic attack emits a series of rings around the player knocking nearby opponents off the track while a third level sonic attack sends the rings forward, knocking all racers ahead of the player off of the track. In addition to the emphasis on user-generated content, the game includes a full-fledged single-player mode featuring a story by professional Hollywood writers.

=== ModSpot ===
ModSpot is the main lobby area for ModNation Racers. Players can meet up, race, and create and download content. The ModSpot contains Race Station which has Online Race, Quick Race, Split-Screen and Career (Story Mode), Creation Station, where players create their Mods, Karts and Tracks, and also share and shop points, Top Mods, Top Karts and Top Tracks, Coming Attractions to view upcoming DLC, Hot Lap where players can try to earn the best times on a track and a News Update screen. Players can start chats using text, voice or gestures.

=== Content creation ===
When the game was first announced, it was likened to LittleBigPlanet to highlight the game's emphasis on customization. Players are able to design and create their own characters, vehicles and race tracks in great detail. The overall style of the cars and characters is based on vinyl art and collectors' toys, but players are able to greatly modify their clothing and overall look. Players are also able to create and modify race tracks using the in-game 'Track Studio' tool. This tool was showcased at Sony's E3 2009 press conference where one of the game's developers created a race track and its surroundings in a five-minute presentation. In April 2010, Infamous developer Sucker Punch Productions showcased the game's editing tools with a track based on Empire City, where Infamous is set.

Players start off by customizing their racer who begins as an all-white character model similar to Sackboy from LittleBigPlanet. Players can put various decals, different skins, masks, facial hair as well as other details on their racer. The material properties of certain customizable accessories allow players to make materials look more rubbery or metallic.

The in-game track creator as demonstrated at E3 2009.

The track creation was designed to be user-friendly and has been described as "probably one of the deepest you’ve ever seen in a racing game." The player drives over a flat terrain template and "paints" the road from the starting point of the race to the finish. The player can then modify things such as land deformation, lakes, mountains, surface texture, houses, item pick-ups, trees, animals and time-of-day settings. 30 staff-made circuits were available on release, according to United Front Games at E3 2009. Players can choose between 29 different types of terrain to create a track on. Landscapes can be sprayed onto the course using a virtual spray can such as dirt, sand, and tunnels. The game can auto-populate the track with items and ramps after the player creates the basic design. Players can set up moving obstacles such as the Devastator which drops a crusher from the sky to destroy vehicles based on a timer or a switch, other obstacles include spinning platforms and leaping enemies. Players can also take a snapshot of the thumbnail for the level which appears when the track is posted in the online community. In addition, players can also create short cuts on tracks through specific track pieces or open terrain short cuts.

User created content could be downloaded and played in ModNation Racers: Road Trip for the PlayStation Vita.

== Story ==
The story centers around the player character, commonly referred to as 'Tagger' or 'Tag', who remains silent throughout in-game cutscenes. Biff Tradwell and Gary Reasons, commentators of the ModNation Racing Championship, announce the qualifier for this season's MRC tour. Tag lives with his mother at their family-run paintshop, where business has been slow for a long time. Upon showing an MRC poster to race to his mother, she informs him that his old-friend, Chief, is now a crew-chief, which, along with his own kart, is all he needs to enter the qualifier. Chief, while critical of Tag's choice of kart decoration, agrees to be his crew-chief.

Upon qualifying for the MRC Tour and already becoming a popular contestant with fans for his unique style, Tag's Uncle Richard, head of Conservative Motors, a company responsible for cheap, bland and uninteresting karts, attempts to sign him up for a sponsorship deal that is quickly turned down. Halfway through the Home Tour, Tag's mother reveals that they are unable to afford the constant repairs to his kart. When the kart blows out, Tag's mother, inspired by her son's newfound popularity, decides to reopen her paintshop as a bodyshop garage, becoming an instant hit with customers and allowing them to stay financially afloat.

During the third Tour, Chief finds that the Boom Box Weapons System on Tag's kart is badly damaged, despite its supposed indestructibility, and since it is expensive to replace, could risk Tag being unable to continue the Tour. Tag's mother asks if the Boom Box from Chief's old kart is still functional after his racing wreck since 1985, but Chief claims it was the reason he was unable to continue racing. While working on repairs for Tag's kart the night before the Grim Tour, Chief discovers a bomb planted on the kart's undercarriage. Chief survives the explosion, but falls into a coma. Not wanting his mother to sell the bodyshop, Tag reluctantly signs on to the Conservative Motors team, much to Uncle Richard's delight. As a result, he has to race in a bland kart and racing outfit with no creative freedom, with Richard acting as his inexperienced crew-chief.

Eventually, Chief recovers from his coma. Distraught that Tag has signed onto the CM Team, Chief reveals that he actually retired from racing after being petrified from his wreck caused by MRC reigning champion Espresso, and that the Boom Box from his kart is still functional. He offers it to Tag so that he can remain in the Grim Tour, and break away from CM to get his creative freedom back.

As Tag, his mother, and Chief celebrate his victory over Espresso in the final race, Richard claims CM won due to the signed contract, but he gets arrested. A video of Espresso stealing Tag's trophy is shown, but the Chief got his revenge by smacking him down with his bare hands like what Espresso did with his kart.

== Development ==
The game was first announced at the Electronic Entertainment Expo 2009 cited as being a "thoroughly modern take on kart racing." Producer Dan Sochan stated that the PlayStation Network being free and the PlayStation 3 console's power were important factors when deciding to make ModNation Racers a PlayStation 3-exclusive game. During development, the aim has been to reduce the restrictions and limits the circuit building tool places on circuit design, to create as open an experience as possible. The circuits themselves won't necessarily have to be realistic as various obstacles, launchers and the like will be available, as well as some new and original weapons. In addition United Front Games, the developers of ModNation Racers, have a "great relationship" with LittleBigPlanet developer Media Molecule. At Gamescom 2009 in August, the developers confirmed that ModNation Racers was to have 4-player split screen and an online mode where twelve people could join in on a single race.

== Marketing ==
Sony announced a range of pre-order incentives featuring video game characters. Kratos (from God of War) and his Kart of Chaos, Ratchet and Clank (from Ratchet & Clank) with their HoverKart, Nathan Drake (from Uncharted) with his Jungle Jeep Kart, and Sackboy (from LittleBigPlanet), with his Cardboard Kart.

A demo was released on the PlayStation Store one week prior to the game's release. It includes limited Track, Mod and Kart creation tools and offline multiplayer and single player races.

A month prior to the game's release, an event was held in PlayStation Home in a special events space called The Backstage Pass and the event was called the "ModSpot Challenge". The challenge was for users to run around the dedicated area of the space and search for certain Mods. This event began on April 29, 2010, in the European and North American versions. On May 6, 2010 GameSpot began to give away Air Raid downloadable content to their members. On May 27, 2010, a dedicated Game Space was released in PlayStation Home for ModNation Racers called the ModNation Club. The space features a Sticky Wall where users can create their own stickers and it also features a kart race minigame based on ModNation Racers. Sweet Tooth (from Twisted Metal) with his ice cream truck was released as downloadable content on July 6, 2010. ModNation Racers was also available as a social multiplayer game on Facebook. On May 16, 2011, Sony announced that the PSP edition of the game would be given for free on the PlayStation Store for 30 days as a welcome back gesture after the 2011 PlayStation Network outage.

== Closure of online servers ==
On April 12, 2018, it was announced that Sony Interactive Entertainment would cease all online function for the game on July 10, 2018. This, along with a few other PlayStation titles such as CounterSpy, LittleBigPlanet Karting, and Gravity Rush 2, would all have their online functionality removed. On May 3, 2018, it was announced that the online services deadline would be extended to October 10, 2018, because of the reaction by some players.

== Reception ==
Reception

Aggregate score
Aggregator	Score	
Aggregator	PS3	PSP
Metacritic	82/100	73/100

Review scores
Publication	Score	
Publication	PS3	PSP
The A.V. Club	B+	N/A
Destructoid	6.5/10	N/A
Eurogamer	7/10	N/A
Famitsu	30/40	28/40
Game Informer	8.5/10	N/A
GamePro	4/5	N/A
GameSpot	8/10	8/10
GameTrailers	7.9/10	N/A
Giant Bomb	4/5	N/A
IGN	9/10	7.4/10
Joystiq	4/5	N/A
Pocket Gamer	N/A	3.5/5
PlayStation: The Official Magazine	4/5	3/5
Push Square	9/10	7/10
The Escapist	4/5	N/A
Teletext GameCentral	6/10	N/A

The PlayStation 3 version received "favorable" reviews, while the PSP version received above-average reviews, according to the review aggregation website Metacritic. IGN US commended the PS3 version for its excellent kart racing mechanics and robust level design tools, stating, "If you can dream it, you really can make it in ModNation Racers." Eurogamer criticized the long loading times and said that the dynamic game difficulty can make the player feel like they're "operating at a distinct disadvantage," but that, when playing online or split-screen against other human players, "ModNation allows its own charm to shine through". In Japan, where the game was ported for release under the name ModNation: Mugen no Kart Ōkoku (モッドネーション 無限のカート王国, ModdoNēshon Mugen no Kāto Ōkoku) on July 29, 2010, Famitsu gave it a score of 30 out of 40 for the PlayStation 3 version, and 28 out of 40 for the Portable version.

Armando Rodriguez of 411Mania gave the PlayStation 3 version 8.7 out of 10, saying, "If you even remotely like Kart Racers and are interested in the deep create tools then ModNation Racers is a must buy. Just be prepared to endure some slightly longer than usual loading times and the insane A.I. difficulty in the Career Mode. If you can deal with that you will discover how great ModNation is." Adam Larck also gave it 8.7 out of 10, saying that the game "shows exactly the kind of strong exclusive title Sony needs. Building off the success LittleBigPlanet had with customization, ModNation shows that racing games can be successful with huge amount of customization as well. Fans of casual racers have a must-have title in their hands. Other PS3 owners should at least check it out to have some racing fun." The Escapist gave it four stars out of five, calling it "A standard, competent kart racer hampered by frequent loading times and irritating writing, but bolstered by an intuitive and powerful editor that lets gamers make their karts, racetracks, and characters their own - or at least lets them make their characters into Spider-Man." However, Teletext GameCentral gave it six out of ten, saying, "Sony's Mario Kart clone has some impressive customisation tools but as a racer it lacks any real drive."

GameZone gave the PS3 version nine out of ten, calling it "An intelligent, deep and enjoyable game that takes the 'play, create, share' initiative and runs with it. Fun, entertaining, a pleasure to look at and create in – MNR raises the bar for the genre." Edge gave it eight out of ten, calling it "A triumphant toolset attached to a decent stab at the karting genre."

During the Academy of Interactive Arts & Sciences' 14th Annual Interactive Achievement Awards, the PlayStation 3 version was nomimated for the "Racing Game of the Year" award, which went to Need for Speed: Hot Pursuit.
