= Little Nightmares (franchise) =

- Genres: Cinematic platformer, puzzle
- Developers: Tarsier Studios; Supermassive Games; Alike Studios; Engine Software; Playdigious; Iconik
- Publisher: Bandai Namco Entertainment
- Platforms: Android; Google Stadia; iOS; Nintendo Switch; PlayStation 4; Windows; Xbox One; PlayStation 5; Xbox Series X/S; Nintendo Switch 2
- First release: Little Nightmares; 28 April 2017
- Latest release: Little Nightmares III; 10 October 2025

Little Nightmares is a platform-puzzle horror adventure video game series. Each game follows child protagonists who must navigate through surreal, nightmarish settings, while solving environmental puzzles and encountering monstrous enemies. The franchise is managed and published by Bandai Namco Entertainment. Tarsier Studios developed the first two games, Little Nightmares and Little Nightmares II, while Supermassive Games developed the third game, Little Nightmares III. The series had sold more than 20 million copies by June 2025.

The franchise also includes the mobile game Very Little Nightmares (2019), the audio drama series The Sounds of Nightmares (2023), the virtual reality game Little Nightmares VR: Altered Echoes (2026), three comic series, and a young adult novel titled Little Nightmares: The Lonely Ones (2025).

== Main games ==
Release timeline
2017	Little Nightmares
2018
2019	Very Little Nightmares
2020
2021	Little Nightmares II
2022
2023
2024
2025	Little Nightmares III
2026	Little Nightmares VR: Altered Echoes

=== Little Nightmares (2017) ===
In the game, the player assumes control of Six, a hungry little girl who must escape the Maw, an underwater vessel inhabited by monstrous, twisted beings.

Little Nightmares was developed by Swedish company Tarsier Studios, which first announced it as Hunger in 2014. It shared thematic connections with Tarsier's cancelled game named The City of Metronome. With the game, the team wanted to explore the "wild extremes" of childhood. Its setting, the Maw, was created as a piece of concept art "where all the worst things in the world could be left to rot". Lucas Roussel said that the game's core design principle was to "root both environments and characters in a nightmarish logic with a child perspective". In keeping with the theme of childhood, the team opted against creating a powerful protagonist. While the gameplay has been described as stealth-based, the team prefers to describe it as "hide and seek", as the term "stealth" gives the impression of an empowered character.

Bandai Namco Entertainment published Little Nightmares in April 2017. Receiving critical praise, the game sold 2 million copies by May 2020.

Tarsier supported Little Nightmares with three downloadable content packs collectively known as "Secrets of the Maw". A mobile version was released by Playdigious in December 2023, while a remaster of the game titled Enhanced Edition was developed by Engine Software and released on October 10 to coincide with the release of Little Nightmares III.

=== Little Nightmares II (2021) ===
The story follows Mono, a young boy who must work together with Six to survive the horrors of the Pale City and discover its dark secrets.

Tarsier Studios returned to develop the sequel. As opposed to the first game, whose theme focuses on "greed and consumption", Little Nightmares II is about "escapism". Mono is the only playable character while Six, who assists Mono, is controlled by artificial intelligence. This design allowed the team to extend the length and increase the complexity of the game's puzzles. Development of the game started immediately following the completion of the original game.

Little Nightmares II was released in February 2021, and received generally positive reviews. Within one month of release, it had sold one million units worldwide.

Tarsier Studios was acquired by Embracer Group in December 2019. In February 2021, Tarsier confirmed they departed the franchise to focus on creating new intellectual properties. Bandai Namco, which retained the rights to Little Nightmares, began seeking other developers to continue the franchise. Supermassive Games developed the game's Enhanced Edition, which introduced a number of graphical improvements when it was released in August 2021.

In 2026, Tarsier released a "spiritual successor" to Little Nightmares called Reanimal.

=== Little Nightmares III (2025) ===
The game follows Low and Alone, two children trapped in the Spiral, a cluster of nightmarish locations within the Nowhere.

Released in October 2025, Little Nightmares III was developed by Supermassive Games. It introduces cooperative gameplay, with the two characters wielding different abilities, and features a new cast and new location. The game received mixed reviews upon release. Supermassive is set to release an expansion pack titled Secrets of the Spiral in 2026.

== Spin-offs ==
=== Very Little Nightmares (2019) ===
A mobile game titled Very Little Nightmares was announced in April 2019 and was released in May 2019 on iOS and for Android the following December. The story acts as a prequel to Little Nightmares and Little Nightmares II. The game was developed by Alike Studios. The player assumes control of The Girl in the Yellow Raincoat, who must explore a dangerous mansion known as the Nest. Unlike the main games, which are side-scrolling, Very Little Nightmares is played from an isometric perspective.

=== Little Nightmares VR: Altered Echoes (2026) ===
Little Nightmares VR: Altered Echoes is a virtual reality first-person survival horror-puzzle video game. Players control Dark Six, Six's doppelgänger from the original game, who must embark on a quest to reunite with her counterpart. It was developed by Iconik and released on 24 April 2026, for a variety of VR headsets.

== Other media ==
=== Television series ===
In June 2017, Dmitri M. Johnson and Stephan Bugaj of DJ2 Entertainment announced that they would be producing a television adaptation of Little Nightmares in collaboration with Bandai Namco. The series will be developed by Anthony and Joe Russo and the pilot will be directed by Henry Selick.

In June 2025, a stop motion animated project being developed in collaboration with the Mexican studio Taller del Chucho was announced with a teaser trailer. In March 2026, the project was revealed as a short film titled Little Nightmares – Broken Promises and as directed by Sofía Carillo and Juan Medina. It was written by Carrillo and Lonnie Nadler and has a runtime of 13 minutes. The film premiered as part of the "Commissioned Films" category at the 2026 Annecy International Animation Film Festival between June 21 and 27.

=== Comic books and novels ===
A four-issue tie-in comic book miniseries, titled Little Nightmares, was written by John Shackleford and penciled by Aaron Alexovitch, and published by Titan Comics. Two issues were released both in physical and digital copies on May 31 and July 26, 2017, with the last two being canceled. A hardcover graphic novel of the first two issues was released at the end of October 2017.

A six part motion comic, titled Little Nightmares Comics, was released in early 2021 by Plastiek and Bandai Namco for iOS and Android for free.

From October 2025 to January 2026, a second horror comic miniseries written by Lonnie Nadler and illustrated by Dennis Menheere, Little Nightmares: Descent to Nowhere, was released in monthly issues. It was reported to delve deeper into the lore of the universe of Little Nightmares, and stars Mono, a girl named Hush, and a detective named Myra investigating the disappearances of children.

In June 2025, a young adult horror novel titled Little Nightmares: The Lonely Ones was announced. The book centers on a child named Ruse at a "nightmarish carnival" and was written by E. C. Myers and published by Scholastic on September 2, 2025.

=== Audio series ===
A six-episode audio fiction series written by Lonnie Nadler, titled The Sounds of Nightmares, was released from August 22 to September 19 2023, featuring the character Noone. As of June 2025, The Sounds of Nightmares had surpassed two million listens and a second season was announced to be in development.

=== Others ===
A live play tabletop role-playing game one-shot, titled Little Nightmares III - Sickly Sweet, was released on the official YouTube channel of Bandai Namco Entertainment America on September 30, 2025.
