= Little Nightmares VR: Altered Echoes =

2026 virtual reality video game

- Developer: Iconik
- Publisher: Bandai Namco Entertainment
- Composer: Christian Björklund
- Series: Little Nightmares
- Platforms: Meta Quest 2; Meta Quest 3; Meta Quest 3S; PlayStation VR2; Windows
- Release: WW: 24 April 2026
- Genres: Adventure, puzzle, horror
- Mode: Single-player

Little Nightmares VR: Altered Echoes is a 2026 virtual reality adventure game developed by Iconik and published by Bandai Namco Entertainment. A spin-off of the Little Nightmares series, it is the first entry in the series designed for first-person virtual reality. The game was released for PlayStation VR2, SteamVR-compatible Windows headsets, Meta Quest 2, 3, and 3S on 24 April 2026.

The game follows Dark Six, a separated part of Six, as she moves through distorted locations connected to the Transmission. The PlayStation 5 version received mixed reviews from critics.

== Gameplay ==
Little Nightmares VR: Altered Echoes is played from a first-person perspective and was designed for virtual reality headsets. Players control Dark Six, a small childlike figure, as she explores oversized environments, solves environmental puzzles, climbs through spaces, handles objects, and hides from larger enemies. The game includes stealth and chase sequences, with chapters involving different forms of interaction such as climbing, crouching, object handling, and avoiding larger hostile figures. Its virtual reality design changes the series' usual side-view presentation into a first-person viewpoint, placing the player at Dark Six's scale within the game's environments.

== Plot ==
=== Setting and characters ===
Little Nightmares VR: Altered Echoes is set inside the Transmission, a distorted signal connected to the Nowhere and the events of Little Nightmares II. The player character is Dark Six, a separated part of Six who searches for her other self. Six, Mono, and the Thin Man are connected to the game's opening events, with the Thin Man separating Dark Six from Six. Other figures encountered in the Transmission include the Teacher in the School, the Guests and the Conductor on the train, and the Music Box, which guides Dark Six through the distorted locations.

=== Story ===
After the Thin Man captures Six, Dark Six reappears in the room with the television and follows Six into the Transmission, where she falls through the flesh-like interior of the Signal Tower. Inside the tower, she passes through cells holding other children and follows the sound of a music box through distorted corridors, television screens, and rooms where the tower appears to draw children into its broadcast.

Dark Six reaches Six, who is absorbed in her music box, but the room is consumed by darkness and Dark Six is displaced into altered versions of locations connected to Six and Mono's earlier journey. In the School, she encounters lifeless Bullies and avoids the Teacher while moving through classrooms, vents, and a collapsing library. After finding a damaged music box, the School changes into a warped version of itself, and Dark Six briefly sees Six before being pulled into another distorted location.

Dark Six next arrives at a train station, where she restores power and adjusts the station clock to board a train. The passengers are Guests, and the Conductor patrols the carriages. Dark Six evades the Conductor, moves through the train, and separates the coal car from the engine before another damaged music box returns her to an altered version of the train. A glimpse of Six leads her into a mansion, where the Naturalist uses flash photography against Nomes. Dark Six moves through the mansion and its hidden spaces before trapping the Naturalist in a cage. Another music box then opens a path into a dark void containing a larger music box.

Inside the music box, Dark Six travels through shifting children's rooms and mechanical interiors. She encounters Six in the monstrous form seen in Little Nightmares II and follows her through collapsing versions of the earlier locations as the music box deteriorates. Dark Six attempts to reach Six, but Six continues toward the door used at the end of Little Nightmares II, while the path beneath Dark Six collapses and she falls into darkness.

The ending shows Dark Six trapped inside a music box that falls through the flesh-like abyss of the Signal Tower. After the box is damaged and breaks open, Dark Six escapes and walks through the mass of flesh and eyes toward the same door Six used.

== Development and release ==
Developer Iconik is based in La Ciotat, France. The game was first announced during the Little Nightmares Showcase in June 2025, where a teaser trailer revealed the title but not the developer, platforms, or release window. In March 2026, Iconik was confirmed as the developer, and the game was announced for PlayStation VR2, SteamVR, and Meta Quest platforms. It was developed as a standalone entry in the franchise, with an independent story that also references previous games in the series.

Little Nightmares VR: Altered Echoes was released on 24 April 2026. A May 2026 update added smooth turning options, a PC-only option to disable the hood/vignette effect, and several improvements to climbing, collision, environment interactions, enemy behaviour, and object visibility. The update followed criticism from some players and reviewers about the absence of smooth turning and the inability to disable the hood/vignette effect at launch.

== Reception ==
Reception

Aggregate scores
Aggregator	Score
Metacritic	PS5: 70/100; PC: 80/100
OpenCritic	50% recommend (Note: Based on 21 reviews)

Review scores
Publication	Score
Push Square	6/10
CGMagazine	7.5/10
Noisy Pixel	7/10
Twisted Voxel	7.5/10

According to review aggregator Metacritic, the PlayStation 5 version received "mixed or average" reviews, while the PC version received "generally favorable" reviews. Review aggregator OpenCritic assigned a "fair" rating based on 21 reviews, with the game being recommended by 50% of critics.

Mike Johnson of UploadVR wrote that the game retained the series' hide-and-seek structure and praised its sense of scale, sound, and presentation, but found it missed opportunities for broader VR interaction and lacked quality-of-life features for experienced VR players. Marcus Kenneth of CGMagazine praised its atmosphere, sound design, and immersion, while criticizing predictable enemy behaviour, occasional visual clarity issues, and concerns about virtual reality sickness.

Writing for Noisy Pixel, Colin Buchanan described it as a faithful adaptation of the series' tone and horror style, but said its pacing, motion-control issues, lore-dependent story, and short length limited its impact. In Push Square, Graham Banas rated the game 6 out of 10, complimenting the first-person perspective, creature design, and visuals, but criticizing trial-and-error level design, the lack of smooth turning at launch, and weak cohesion between levels. Salal Awan of Twisted Voxel praised its sound design and atmosphere while finding the gameplay repetitive and the experience short.

=== Awards ===
The game was nominated for "Best VR/AR Game" at The Game Awards 2026.
