= Reanimal =

2026 video game

- Developer: Tarsier Studios
- Publisher: THQ Nordic
- Producers: Philip Edeheim; Andreas Johnsson
- Designers: Dennis Talajic; Antony Wilkinson; Björn Sunesson
- Programmers: Joschka Pöttgen; Tristan Louet; Mattias Lindblad
- Artists: Per Bergman; Ole Josefsen
- Writer: David Mervik
- Composers: Christian Vasselbring; Jacob Carlsson; Stefan Almqvist
- Engine: Unreal Engine 5
- Platforms: Nintendo Switch 2; PlayStation 5; Windows; Xbox Series X/S
- Release: 13 February 2026
- Genres: Survival horror, cinematic platformer
- Modes: Single-player, multiplayer

Reanimal is a 2026 horror adventure video game developed by Tarsier Studios and published by THQ Nordic. The story follows a brother and sister duo, as they survive a flooded, hellish version of their home island, which has become inhabited by hostile creatures, while attempting to save their three friends. It was released on 13 February 2026 for Nintendo Switch 2, PlayStation 5, Windows, and Xbox Series X/S, to generally positive reviews with praise directed toward its atmosphere, graphics, and sound.

== Gameplay ==
Reanimal is a survival horror game, stealth game, and a cinematic platformer. The player must explore the game's setting—a mysterious island beset by war, monsters, and flooding—escape, outsmart, and fight enemies, and solve various environmental puzzles in order to progress. They also have access to a boat, which enables them to explore locations off the critical path in a nonlinear manner. The game supports both single-player and two-player online or local cooperative multiplayer, with the first player controlling the Brother and the second controlling the Sister. In single-player, the second companion is controlled by artificial intelligence. The game also has many collectibles in the form of posters that unlock concept art in the main menu, hats and masks that both characters can equip, and coffins that unlock a secret ending.

== Plot ==
The Boy, who wears a sack mask and noose around his neck, awakens at sea from a dream of himself, his sister, and their three friends peering down a well. He uses a speedboat to retrieve the Girl, his sister, who wears a white nightgown and rabbit mask. They pilot to shore and reach the island they lived in, which has heavily flooded and decayed and shows signs of war. Throughout their journey, the Girl suffers from stomach pains and has visions of a sheep at the bottom of the well from the Boy's dream, growing and eventually crawling out. They can also find five coffins that reveal shadowy figures when opened; the first four show the Boy and the three friends being killed, and the fifth shows a fleeing rabbit.

The siblings rescue their first friend Hood from Sniffer, a lanky, grotesque humanoid who can teleport by crawling in and out of corpses, and escape him and the living suits of skin made from his captured victims. As the group travels more of the island, they encounter the bloated, water-dwelling Boomers and witness their second friend, Bandage, being snatched by a monstrous pelican. The siblings follow it to a lighthouse, freeing Bandage and trapping the pelican in a burning barn. With one friend left to find, the four children head to a dilapidated orphanage. The siblings enter to find it inhabited by the Spider Kids, who are led by the arachnid-like Mother. They kill the Mother and rescue their third friend Bucket. Outside the orphanage, soldiers are mobilizing and the now-reunited children stow away in a cargo truck, which crashes inside a bunker tunnel. Using a coastal battery to shoot the Brook Horse, an aquatic monster blocking their path inland, the siblings then remove one of its eyes to offer it to a blind, serpentine whale in exchange for passage through the wreckage of a warship.

When the group enters an underground subway, the Girl vomits up the sheep from her visions, which grows and mutates rapidly, devouring each of the three friends. The siblings make their way through a war-torn city, where many soldiers have fallen in combat or are committing suicide. The pair take control of a tank and drive away as the now-colossal sheep gives chase; they seemingly kill it with the tank's cannon before it mutates further and swallows them both. Inside the sheep and following the Boy's calls, the Girl finds a hut with a dead rabbit, before the doors shut and she is knocked unconscious. A flashback shows the Boy and the three friends performing a blood ritual and dragging the bound Girl to the well. A flock of sheep standing on their hind legs encircle the group, bleating as the sky rains blood. The dream of everyone peering down the well is shown again, but without the Girl present, as she is seen motionless at the bottom of the well before floating in the air and reanimating.

In a post-credits scene, the well floods as the Girl's body floats to the top. If all five coffins were found, the scene is altered to include shadowy figures in rabbit masks similar to the Girl's emerging from the well and surrounding her.

=== The Expanded World ===
A trio of DLC chapters that "uncover long dead secrets, and cast new light on old friends" was planned. The first was released in August 2026.

==== The Prisoner ====
A flashback shows a girl in a military uniform, the Soldier, telling the shackled Prisoner to leave her cell or risk freezing. In the present, the duo parachutes from a warplane into the city while avoiding gunfire. The Prisoner sees glimpses of a second prisoner watching them, which the Soldier cannot see. The duo is chased by a heavyset soldier wielding a flamethrower, whom they kill by shooting his backpack tank. After surviving a falling parachute mine by hiding inside a bathtub, they enter an underground subway station where, during a moment of quiet, ice forms around the shivering Prisoner. The pair fight off the Spider Kids and escape from the Mother. The second prisoner appears and asks the Prisoner if the Soldier knows her secret, which the Prisoner denies.

== Development ==
Reanimal was developed by Swedish company Tarsier Studios, the creator of the Little Nightmares series. After they were acquired by Embracer Group in 2019, the studio in 2021 announced that they will be working on a new intellectual property instead of continuing the series. Franchise owner Bandai Namco Entertainment entrusted Supermassive Games to develop Little Nightmares III, while Tarsier worked on Reanimal. The team considered Reanimal to be a spiritual successor to the Little Nightmares series, though it was designed to be "more terrifying" than its predecessors. The game is developed with Unreal Engine 5.

Unlike the Little Nightmare series, Reanimal utilizes a dynamic game camera that constantly keeps both characters in frame. The goal for the studio was to "maximise claustrophobia and tension" and created a shared sense of horror if players are playing the game cooperatively. Narratively, the game relies heavily on environmental storytelling, though both protagonists in the game are voiced. The team wanted to evoke both a sense of adventure and sense of dread, and they were inspired by games such as It Takes Two, The Legend of Zelda: The Wind Waker and Silent Hill 2. The protagonists must face their troubled past as they confront these monsters, whose designs were "centered around" their shared past. The team also wanted to create a sense of eeriness using imagery that corrupts and defiles an otherwise peaceful and serene setting.

=== Release ===
On 22 March 2023, Tarsier Studios shared a teaser screenshot of the game on their Twitter account. Publisher THQ Nordic officially announced the game in August 2024 at Gamescom. The game was released for Windows, PlayStation 5, Xbox Series X|S and Nintendo Switch 2 on 13 February 2026. A free crossplay "Friend's Pass" is available, allowing players to join a friend online that has purchased the full game. A DLC expansion titled The Expanded World is in development, with the first of its three chapters, The Prisoner, releasing on 7 August 2026.

== Reception ==
Reception

Aggregate scores
Aggregator	Score
Metacritic	(NS2) 83/100 (PC) 80/100 (PS5) 80/100 (XSXS) 83/100
OpenCritic	82% recommend

Review scores
Publication	Score
Destructoid	8/10
Eurogamer	4/5
Game Informer	8.25/10
GameSpot	8/10
GamesRadar+	3.5/5
Nintendo Life	9/10
PC Gamer (US)	74/100
PCGamesN	6/10
Push Square	8/10
RPGFan	80/100
The Guardian	3/5
VideoGamer.com	9/10

Reanimal received "generally favorable" reviews, according to review aggregator website Metacritic. Review aggregator OpenCritic assessed that the game received strong approval, being recommended by 82% of critics. Shortly after launch, the game was review bombed on Steam due to players being frustrated that the Friend's Pass was then not available there. Several hours later, Tarsier Studios announced the Friend's Pass was now available on Steam.

Susanne Möller of Sveriges Television's Kulturnyheterna rated the game five out of five, calling it "really unpleasant in the best of ways" and a bit reminiscent of the films of Roy Andersson. She said it mixes grotesque evil with childlike innocence and uses the environment for storytelling that remains enigmatic. She said the camera is used cleverly to enhance the horror, but occasionally causes annoyance with its behaviour.

Reanimal received a nomination for "Best Indie Game" at the Golden Joystick Awards 2026.
