= The Stretchers =

- Cover art of the game
- Developer: Tarsier Studios (Note: Additional work by Nintendo Software Technology)
- Publisher: Nintendo
- Directors: Viktor Lindäng; Masamichi Abe
- Producers: Paul Allen; Toyokazu Nonaka; Yoshiaki Koizumi; Katsuya Eguchi
- Designers: Asger Kristiansen; Marc Cartwright
- Engine: Unreal Engine 4
- Platform: Nintendo Switch
- Release: November 8, 2019
- Genre: Action puzzle
- Modes: Single-player, multiplayer

The Stretchers (Note: Japanese: ストレッチャーズ, Hepburn: Sutoretchāzu) is a 2019 action puzzle game developed by Tarsier Studios and published by Nintendo. It released for the Nintendo Switch on November 8, 2019.

== Gameplay ==
The Stretchers features lighthearted, ragdoll physics-based puzzles in which players are tasked with rescuing civilian "Dizzies"—residents that have been "dizzied" by the evil Captain Brains—and returning them to the hospital. Players take on the role of medics to reach the location of Dizzies via an ambulance, with the ability to drive recklessly off ramps and through obstacles such as fences and walls.

The game can be played in single-player, in which one player controls both paramedics, or in two-player co-op, where each player controls one of the medics. Players can unlock character costumes and furniture for the medics' home base by exploring the world map and mission areas. The comical style and co-operative gameplay of The Stretchers is reminiscent of that of the Overcooked! series, while the careless ambulance driving has been compared to the gameplay of Crazy Taxi.

== Reception ==
The Stretchers received "generally favorable reviews" according to the review aggregator Metacritic.

Reception

Aggregate score
Aggregator	Score
Metacritic	75/100

Review score
Publication	Score
GameRevolution	8/10
