= Oddworld: Stranger's Wrath =

2005 video game

- Developers: Oddworld Inhabitants; Just Add Water (PC/PlayStation 3); Square One (iOS/Android/BlackBerry); Ouya
- Publishers: EA Games (Xbox); Oddworld Inhabitants (remaster); Microids (Nintendo Switch)
- Director: Lorne Lanning
- Producer: Josh Heeren
- Designer: Erik Yeo
- Programmer: Charles Bloom
- Artists: Ryan Ellis; Gautam Babbar
- Writers: Lorne Lanning; Gautam Babbar
- Composer: Michael Bross
- Series: Oddworld
- Platforms: Xbox; Microsoft Windows; PlayStation 3 OnLive; PlayStation Vita iOS; Android; Ouya macOS; Nintendo Switch; PlayStation 4 Xbox One
- Release: January 25, 2005: Xbox; NA: January 25, 2005; EU: March 3, 2005; AU: March 5, 2005 Windows; WW: December 20, 2010; WW: September 14, 2012 (HD) PlayStation 3 (PSN); NA: December 27, 2011; EU: December 21, 2011; AU: December 21, 2011 OnLive June 27, 2012 PlayStation Vita; NA: December 18, 2012; EU: December 19, 2012 iOS November 27, 2014 Android December 8, 2014 Ouya January 27, 2015 OS X March 9, 2015 Nintendo Switch January 23, 2020 PlayStation 4, Xbox One February 11, 2022
- Genres: First-person, third-person shooter, action-adventure
- Mode: Single-player

Oddworld: Stranger's Wrath is an action-adventure video game developed by Oddworld Inhabitants and published by Electronic Arts for the Xbox. It was released on January 25, 2005, and is the fourth overall entry of the Oddworld series.

The game details the adventures of Stranger, a fearsome bounty hunter. Throughout the game, Stranger pursues and captures outlaws in order to collect bounties. The goal is to ultimately earn enough moolah (in-game money) to pay for a mysterious life-saving operation. One of the most notable features is the "live ammunition" system, which is ammunition made of living creatures like fictional insects and small mammals, each with different uses and effects against enemies.

The game was released on Steam in December 2010 as part of the Oddboxx, a collection which includes all the Oddworld games. A version for the PlayStation 3 was released via the PlayStation Network in December 2011. A mobile build was released in 2014 for Android and iOS. An Ouya build was released in January 2015. A Nintendo Switch port was released in January 2020, co-published by Microids. The game was released on Xbox One and PlayStation 4 (later made playable on PlayStation 5) on February 11, 2022.

== Gameplay ==
Two different live ammo types: a thudslug and a chippunk.

The premise of Oddworld: Stranger's Wrath is that the player's character, called the Stranger, must capture wanted outlaws, dead or alive. The game utilizes both third and first-person perspectives. In third-person, the player controls Stranger when travelling long distances, platform jumping, rope climbing, and melee combat; and in first-person, ranged weapons are used. Enemies can be approached face-to-face, or by hiding out of enemy sight (as indicated on-screen) and luring foes from or toward the player. Once enemies are encountered, they can be killed or stunned; live captives earn the greater reward. Upon an attempted capture, Stranger is unable to perform other actions and thus is vulnerable. The player has two status bars: health and stamina. When damage is taken, the health bar drops; if it fully depletes, it will result in the death of Stranger. Stamina drops when the player performs actions like melee attacks or falls from a great height. While it refills itself over time, it can be used to shake off health-bar damage; thus healing the player, but draining the stamina more quickly.

One of the game's main features is Stranger's crossbow, used in a first-person perspective, that uses live ammunition in the form of small fictional creatures as projectiles for differing effects. Live ammunition can be bought from the game's vendors or found throughout the game world. When acquired, two different kinds can be assigned to the crossbow at any given time: Stunks as gas grenades, Thudslugs as cannonballs, Boombats as rockets, and Stingbees as small shots.

The game incorporates many role-playing elements in the form of rewards spent on crossbow, ammunition, storage, and armour upgrades and other items such as binoculars and knuckle dusters.

== Plot ==
The game begins with a bounty hunter, known only as the Stranger, catching various Outlaws to raise money for a mysterious operation. He travels through three towns inhabited by the bird-like Clakkerz; Gizzard Gulch, Buzzarton, and finally New Yolk City. Midway through, he hears that a tribe of amphibian creatures called Grubbs are tormented by a demon. Their tribe was formerly protected by a race of centaur-like creatures called the Steef, but these are extinct.

When Stranger is about to leave Buzzarton, he discovers that the river near the town has been dried up by a dam, built by a person called Sekto; and it is revealed that Sekto is responsible for the extinction of the Steef, and has offered a bounty for the last survivors. Sekto believes that the Stranger knows where the Steef are hiding, and hires an outlaw named D. Caste Raider to interrogate him. During the interrogation, Raider discovers that the Stranger is a Steef. After this revelation, the Stranger escapes to the Grubbs' village.

When the Stranger meets the Grubb leader, he discovers that Sekto is the demon that stole the water from the Grubbs (thus depriving them of fish, their main food source), and sent Wolvark soldiers to guard the river and destroy any Grubb settlements they find. The Stranger then confronts Sekto. When Sekto is defeated, the dam is destroyed, freeing the water. As Stranger inspects Sekto's body, Sekto is revealed to be an octopus-like creature called an Octigi, who parasitically controlled the tribe's previous Steef, who dies shortly after the discovery. Sekto is seen swimming away in the newly freed Mongo River.

== Reception ==
Reception

Aggregate scores
Aggregator	Score
GameRankings	XBOX: 87%
Metacritic	XBOX: 88/100; PS3: 82/100; VITA: 83/100 iOS: 77/100; NS: 72/100

Review score
Publication	Score
TouchArcade	5/5

Upon release, Stranger's Wrath received highly positive reviews with an average critic score of 87% at GameRankings and 88 out of 100 at Metacritic. It later was nominated for and won numerous awards for multiple media outlets. It received nominations for Outstanding Achievement in Animation and Outstanding Character Performance – Male at the AIAS' 9th Annual Interactive Achievement Awards, Best Artistic Graphics at GameSpot and Best Cinematics and Best Character (Stranger) at G4, while it was a runner-up for Most Innovative Design on Xbox at IGN, won Best Xbox Exclusive Game from Play magazine, was listed in Game Informer's Top 50 Games of 2005 and Stranger was included in their Top 10 Heroes of 2005. Game Informer's Andrew Reiner gave Stranger's Wrath a 9/10, calling it "A stunning and exquisitely realized masterpiece that delivers a gaming experience unlike any that we've seen before (...) and is truly visionary in its delivery of gameplay."

The Xbox version of Stranger's Wrath was a commercial failure. It sold 600,000 copies by 2012, although Lanning explained that it "really needed to do 1.6 million to break even." Stranger's Wrath HD sold about 600,000 units by March 2014. Lorne Lanning blamed poor sales of the Xbox version on EA's marketing.

== HD remaster ==
An upgraded build of Stranger's Wrath was first announced in 2010 for release on PC and PlayStation 3, developed by Just Add Water.

The game was released on December 21, 2011, in Europe and Australia, and on December 27, 2011, in North America on the PlayStation Network, and includes enhanced 720p visuals, more detailed character models, remastered dialogue, 37 trophies, bonus material and support for the PlayStation Move peripheral that was to be patched later along with 3D support.

The PC build of Stranger's Wrath was released on Steam on December 20, 2010, as part of The Oddboxx, a collected anthology of all four Oddworld games. It is a direct release of the original 2005 Xbox game, with added support for Steamworks Achievements. A patch containing the enhanced content was planned to be released 2–3 months after the PlayStation 3 version is released, and was eventually released on September 14, 2012. In November 2011 before the release date was announced, an XMB Dynamic Theme and LittleBigPlanet 2 costume based on Stranger's Wrath were released on the PlayStation Store.

A PlayStation Vita version was announced on November 23, 2011, and was released on December 18, 2012, in North America and a day later in Europe.

A Wii U version was announced on June 11, 2013, during E3 2013. Oddworld Inhabitants confirmed that it would be making its way to the Wii U's Nintendo eShop. In response to a GoNintendo article in August 2015 about the port's status, Oddworld Inhabitants clarified development on the Wii U build is placed on-hold, but is not officially cancelled. The game was never released for the Wii U.

A mobile build was released in 2014 for Android and iOS.

In September 2018, a Nintendo Switch version was announced at EGX 2018 with a confirmed release date for January 2020. The game was released on the system on January 23, 2020. On the same day, it was announced that the Switch port would be co-published by Microids, as part of a 3-game deal with Oddworld Inhabitants.
