= The City of Metronome =

- Developer: Tarsier Studios
- Platforms: Windows; Xbox 360; PlayStation 3
- Release: Cancelled
- Genres: Puzzle-platform, adventure
- Mode: Single-player

The City of Metronome was a cancelled 3D puzzle-platform game developed by Tarsier Studios. The game featured a young train-engineer named Tin, who had to use sound in order to solve puzzles and maneuver his way throughout an industrial city controlled by a mysterious corporation.

Gameplay was first featured at E3 2005 in its early-development stage. After failing to secure a publisher, the game was cancelled.

== Features ==
The game was an artistic project inspired by several different sources, notably Studio Ghibli and The City of Lost Children. The story would have told itself through events, such as meeting new people and visiting new places. Both the game's official trailer and concept art reveal that the game would have taken place in a steampunk-based environment filled with grotesque humanoid characters. The game's plot was described briefly before its page was removed from the company's official website;

Venture into the city of Metronome, a sprawling mass of haphazardly built houses and huge steam engines where the outlandish inhabitants are carrying out their chores day and night. A city where the life of every citizen is dictated by the Corporation, a single bureaucratic entity that owns all the land, the entire infrastructure and all the industries.

The main characters consist of Tin, a train-engineer, and New, a young girl on the run from the Corporation that controls the city. Other characters include Metrognomes, white humanoids that used to be children before their souls were stolen, and Scouts, robots that appear to look like old-fashioned cameras dressed in police attire.

Gameplay would have relied on a mechanic involving sound. Using a device that he had strapped to his backside, the main character would record and replay sounds in order to interact with his environment. The character had the ability to record any form of sound, and he was able to manipulate both its pitch and frequency. The noise that the player created had different effects on his environment depending on both its tone and pitch, which is where the game's puzzle-solving and strategy came into play.

The game took place in a third-person perspective 3D environment that had the camera focus on the area closest to the player.

== Development and cancellation ==
The game was developed by Tarsier's founders, Andreas Johnsson and Björn Sunesson, beginning in December 2004. The game would ultimately lead to Tarsier's founding, but at the time they were known as Team Tarsier. According to an interview, the game was "corsework" that was paid for by their student-loans. Andreas and Björn went into the game's development completely blind, unsure about the story or its gameplay. The original pitch and concept was quoted as being "A next-gen action adventure game where sound is your weapon". They were able to develop some minor gameplay of their concept that was presented at the 2005 E3 event. Over the next couple of years, both Andreas and Björn met with potential publishers such as Microsoft and Sony, but they were never able to convince any of them to publish the game. After failing to find a publisher by the year 2007, they cancelled the project.

A second demo was created around 2008 and 2009 using prize money from a contest, but this was never shared to the public. This demo was created using design leads that are notable for their work on LittleBigPlanet and Little Nightmares. This second concept was dropped after the team was unable to make their sound-based gameplay "fun".

== Legacy ==
The game served as an inspiration for Little Nightmares, a puzzle-platform horror adventure game published by Bandai Namco Entertainment. Little Nightmares incorporates both the game's gloomy atmosphere and some of its original concepts, such as the Metrognomes, whose names changed to Nomes. The first game also includes some references to the original, such as a picture of a Metrognome in the suitcase that the character Six wakes up in at the beginning of the game.
