= Little Nightmares III =

2025 video game

- Developer: Supermassive Games
- Publisher: Bandai Namco Entertainment
- Director: Wayne Garland
- Producer: Coralie Feniello
- Designer: Andrew Merrick
- Programmers: Tim Green; Ben Gowans
- Artist: Tim Holleyman
- Writers: Steve Goss; Dan Dawes; Naomi Kotler; Paul Martin
- Composer: Hugo Long
- Series: Little Nightmares
- Engine: Unreal Engine 4
- Platforms: Nintendo Switch; Nintendo Switch 2; PlayStation 4; PlayStation 5; Windows; Xbox One; Xbox Series X/S
- Release: WW: 10 October 2025
- Genres: Puzzle-platform, survival horror
- Modes: Single player, multiplayer

Little Nightmares III is a puzzle-platform horror adventure video game developed by Supermassive Games and published by Bandai Namco Entertainment. It is the third installment in the Little Nightmares series and the first to not be developed by Tarsier Studios. The game follows two new child protagonists, Low and Alone, as they navigate through The Nowhere and escape from a looming threat.

Little Nightmares III was released on 10 October 2025 for Nintendo Switch, Nintendo Switch 2, PlayStation 4, PlayStation 5, Windows, Xbox One and Xbox Series X/S. It received mixed reviews from critics with many finding it inferior to its predecessors. Critics praised the game's atmosphere and visuals but criticized the gameplay and technical issues. An upgraded version of the first game, titled Little Nightmares Enhanced Edition, was released on the same day and could be played earlier with a pre-order of Little Nightmares III.

== Gameplay ==
Like its predecessors, the player explores a 3D world, encountering platforming situations and puzzles that must be solved to proceed. Unlike the first two games, the player can now go solo alongside an AI companion or with another player in online co-op. The two main characters have different gameplay mechanics, with Low wielding his bow and arrow, and Alone using her wrench.

== Plot ==
Low, a boy in a raven mask, awakens from a dream of a window in a mirror. Finding himself in a cluster of lands called the Spiral, he consults a piece of paper and is joined by Alone, a girl in a green jumpsuit and aviator hat. They enter the Necropolis, a desert city home to Monster Baby, a colossal doll that turns her victims to stone with her eye. After fending off a swarm of beetles, they are grabbed by Monster Baby and dropped into the rubble. Low has a memory of himself in a padded room, hiding as a shadow looms outside the door. When he awakens, it is nighttime, and he is comforted by Alone. The two are pursued again by Monster Baby, who is driven away by a flock of birds. They come across a mirror and Low travels through it while pulling Alone with him; Alone's emergence from the mirror causes it to shatter. The pair arrives at the Candy Factory, a massive industrial facility where the bloated Herd are transported on a mechanical pulley system to perform their duties. Low and Alone are stalked by the Supervisor, a six-armed woman who watches the factory on security cameras. Eventually they turn off the camera system, enraging the Supervisor and causing her to shed her lower half, revealing an insectoid form. The Supervisor chases Low and Alone through the pipes before they crush her in a hydraulic press. They go through another mirror, where Alone once again shatters it and is unconscious for several seconds after emerging.

Low and Alone enter the Carnevale, which is located on a wooden airship. It is patronized by the Herd and run by living Puppets that attack Low and Alone on sight. Low finds a cracked mirror, but is unable to travel through it. He discards the piece of paper in frustration, which Alone takes. Continuing through the Carnevale, they stumble upon the lair of the Kin, a man who captures children and forces them to perform circus acts, and Mini-Kin, a puppet creature that feasts on the Herd. The pair escapes them in a hot air balloon, setting fire to Mini-Kin with the balloon's burner before floating away. The balloon is struck by lightning and crashes; Low has another memory of his room where he hides his drawings from the shadow in a chute before recovering them alongside a doll that looks like Alone.

Low and Alone end up on the shore of the Institute, a derelict building that resembles the place from Low's memories. It has been overgrown with carnivorous plants and is patrolled by mask-wearing Nurses that the two evade. The pair finds the Alone doll, which transforms the area immediately surrounding it to its pristine former appearance. They use it to traverse the Institute until they are chased by the Hypnotist, a giant man controlling snake-like limbs, having a single eye on the palms of his hands. Low and Alone find the mirror from Low's dream but Alone refuses to enter, allowing the Hypnotist to attack them. They work together to defeat him, collapsing the building as the pair falls. Low has a final memory of cuddling his Alone doll and drawing with her as the doll transforms into Alone. Low and Alone awake next to the fallen Hypnotist and the mirror from Low's dream. Alone is reluctant to enter, but Low pulls her through, only for Alone to be ejected as the mirror breaks. Alone looks at herself before disappearing, leaving behind only her clothes and the piece of paper, which unfurls to reveal a drawing of Low and Alone together with an idyllic background.

In a post-credits scene, Low is seen in a room with the window from his dream, trying to repair a shattered mirror while the Alone doll sits nearby.

=== Secrets of the Spiral ===
A pair of DLC levels that "uncover hidden secrets, new perspectives, and unexpected horrors" was planned. The first was released in June 2026, and the second in September 2026.

==== The Backstage ====
In the Backstage of the Carnevale, Low awakens from a dream of Alone being captured by an unseen creature. He joins forces with Dime, a girl who uses her torch hat to defend against the shadowy Lost Remains infesting the area. The two enter the lair of Alone's captor, the Puppeteer, a living mannequin who makes the Puppets that run the Carnevale. Evading her, they rescue Alone and decapitate the Puppeteer in an elevator. Low discovers his signature raven mask alongside a mirror and pulls both Alone and Dime through, but only Alone emerges with him. Dime, now trapped in a strange dimension of floating mirrors, calls out for them.

==== The Shores ====
Low and Alone, now at the edge of a desolate coastal town, follow Spare, a mysterious child in a diving suit. The town is littered with the corpses of the Herd, many of which are either infested with leeches or being collected by the hooded, lantern-wielding Leech Monster. Spare traps Low and Alone in a room with the Leech Monster, where they discover it is a corpse being controlled by leeches. The leeches abandon their host and corner the duo, only to be electrocuted when Spare helps Low and Alone escape. Leaving the town behind, Low and Alone reach a lighthouse and go through another mirror to the strange dimension. A monstrous version of Dime appears and attempts to stop them from leaving, but Low soothes her, and Dime watches the pair leave in silence.

== Development and release ==
In 2021, Tarsier Studios announced that Little Nightmares II would be its last entry as they were acquired by Embracer Group in December 2019. As the Little Nightmares intellectual rights belong to Bandai Namco, the publisher intends to continue the series without Tarsier.

In August 2023, Little Nightmares III was unveiled at Gamescom's Opening Night Live with an initial release window of 2024. Unlike its predecessors, the game is solely developed by Supermassive Games. Supermassive had prior experience on the Little Nightmares franchise for developing the enhanced PlayStation 5 and Xbox Series X/S ports of the previous game. In May 2024, the game was delayed to 2025. Little Nightmares III was released on 10 October 2025. An upgraded version of the first game, titled Little Nightmares Enhanced Edition, was released on the same day and could be played earlier with a pre-order of Little Nightmares III.

Supermassive will support the game with two downloadable content packs titled Secrets of the Spiral. The first pack, titled The Backstage, was released on June 12, 2026. The second and final pack, The Shores, was released on September 30, 2026.

== Reception ==
Reception

Aggregate scores
Aggregator	Score
Metacritic	(NS2) 69/100 (PC) 69/100 (PS5) 71/100 (XSXS) 72/100
OpenCritic	61% recommend

Review scores
Publication	Score
Destructoid	6/10
Eurogamer	3/5
Famitsu	8/10, 8/10, 8/10, 7/10
Game Informer	7.5/10
GameSpot	7/10
GamesRadar+	3/5
IGN	6/10
Nintendo Life	6/10
PC Gamer (US)	67/100
Push Square	7/10
Shacknews	8/10

Little Nightmares III received "mixed or average" reviews from critics, according to review aggregator website Metacritic. In Japan, four critics from Famitsu gave the game a total score of 31 out of 40.
