= List of LittleBigPlanet downloadable content packs =

LittleBigPlanet is a puzzle platform video game (with user-generated content) for the PlayStation 3. It is developed by Media Molecule, a British company founded in part by Rag Doll Kung Fu creator Mark Healey, and published by Sony Computer Entertainment Europe (SCE). The game received an overwhelmingly positive reaction from critics and has been praised for its presentation, including its graphics, physics and audio, along with its gameplay and large array of customisable and online features.

For the game, Media Molecule has released numerous downloadable content (DLC) packs on the PlayStation Store. All DLC packs released for LittleBigPlanet are also compatible with LittleBigPlanet 2 but those designed for the sequel are not available in the first game. Costumes from both LittleBigPlanet and LittleBigPlanet 2 are compatible with the PlayStation Vita version of the game, as well as LittleBigPlanet Karting for the PS3. The content of the game's DLC packs vary but include costumes, stickers, decorations, objects, music, creation tools and new levels. Some of these packs are available free of charge while others are available to purchase. Much of the development of LittleBigPlanet's DLC is outsourced by Media Molecule to their development partners, Tarsier Studios, Fireproof Games and Supermassive Games. The packs announced to date are listed below.

The Incredibles Costumes and Level Kit were removed from sale in the first week of June 2012 (Later returned in September 2014) It was the first time that non-free content had been removed from sale. No explanation of the reason why was given. On 21 December 2017, all Disney DLC packs across the series were permanently delisted, including The Incredibles and Pirates of the Caribbean Costumes and Level Kits.

On 31 December 2015, all Marvel DLC packs were removed from the PlayStation Store due to licensing expiration. After this date, it was not possible to purchase or download previously purchased copies of the packs.

== Downloadable packs and their contents ==
Pack name and citation	First released	Australia	Europe	North America	Costumes	Stickers	Levels	Notes
2000AD Costume pack	28 May 2009	28 May 2009	28 May 2009	28 May 2009	5	17	—N/a	Individual costumes also available separately
Animal Costume Pack	13 Nov 2008	13 Nov 2008	13 Nov 2008	13 Nov 2008	4	—N/a	—N/a	Pack contains Gorilla, Penguin, Frog and Shark costumes. Individual costumes also available separately. This pack is also included in LittleBigPlanet – Game of the Year Edition.
Ape Escape 'Pipo Monkey' Costume	12 Jan 2009	29 Jan 2009	29 Jan 2009	12 Jan 2009	1	—N/a	—N/a	Originally only available as a pre-order bonus
Assassin's Creed II 'Ezio' Costume	8 Dec 2009	8 Dec 2009	8 Dec 2009	8 Dec 2009	1	—N/a	—N/a	
Beta Test Vest	—N/a	—N/a	—N/a	—N/a	1	—N/a	—N/a	Everyone who takes part in a LittleBigPlanet beta test will receive the Beta Test Vest costume piece.
Bug Blaster Costume	—N/a	—N/a	—N/a	—N/a	1	—N/a	—N/a	The Bug Blaster is awarded to beta testers who report important bugs during beta tests.
Birthday Cake Costume	5 Nov 2009	5 Nov 2009	5 Nov 2009	5 Nov 2009	1	—N/a	—N/a	Originally only available for one week. re-release November 2010. Currently still available as of LBP2 Launch in January 2011.
Buzz! minipack	26 Mar 2009	26 Mar 2009	26 Mar 2009	26 Mar 2009	1	20	—N/a	Contains Buzz! costume and few stickers.
Chinese New Year Costumes	26 Jan 2009	26 Jan 2009	26 Jan 2009	26 Jan 2009	2	—N/a	—N/a	
Creator Pack 1	23 Apr 2009	23 Apr 2009	30 Apr 2009	30 Apr 2009	—N/a	—N/a	—N/a	Pack contains new five Create tools and playable scenes demonstrating the new features (Infinite-Life Checkpoint, Tetherless Jetpack and Enhancement Remover, tweakable visibility for connectors, Global Lighting Switch and tweakable trigger angle range for switches).
Egyptian Mythology Mini-pack	30 Apr 2009	30 Apr 2009	30 Apr 2009	30 Apr 2009	2	10	—N/a	
Festive Goodies Pack	18 Dec 2008	18 Dec 2008	18 Dec 2008	18 Dec 2008	2	12	—N/a	Re-released on 3 December 2009
Ghostbusters	16 Jul 2009	16 Jul 2009	16 Jul 2009	16 Jul 2009	4	36	—N/a	Costumes also available separately
God of War Kratos Costume	29 Jan 2009	29 Jan 2009	29 Jan 2009	29 Jan 2009	1	—N/a	—N/a	Standalone costume available as a pre-order bonus. Also given away free with UK edition of Official PlayStation Magazine.
God of War mini pack	29 Jan 2009	29 Jan 2009	29 Jan 2009	29 Jan 2009	2	17	—N/a	Includes costumes for Medusa and a Minotar as well as God of War themed stickers.
Groundhog Day Costume	29 Jan 2009	29 Jan 2009	29 Jan 2009	29 Jan 2009	1	—N/a	—N/a	Available again the last week of January 2010 for about four weeks
Heavenly Sword Nariko Costume	—N/a	—N/a	—N/a	—N/a	1	—N/a	—N/a	Standalone costume only available as a pre-order bonus
Heavenly Sword mini pack	23 Apr 2009	23 Apr 2009	9 Apr 2009	9 Apr 2009	2	27	—N/a	
Heavy Rain costume pack	8 Jun 2010	8 Jun 2010	8 Jun 2010	8 Jun 2010	5	62	—N/a	Includes costumes of characters from the game Heavy Rain, including Madison, Jayden, Shelby, Ethan, and the Origami Parajita.
Hessian Sackboy Fragrances	1 Apr 2010	1 Apr 2010	1 Apr 2010	1 Apr 2010	2	—N/a	—N/a	Available only for one day. Released as an April Fools' Day joke – although the pack does add new items to the Costumes menu, these merely trigger animations and are not wearable costume items.
History Costume Pack	13 Aug 2009	13 Aug 2009	13 Aug 2009	13 Aug 2009	4	—N/a	—N/a	Costumes also available separately and included in the LittleBigPlanet – Game of the Year Edition.
History Kit	13 Aug 2009	13 Aug 2009	13 Aug 2009	13 Aug 2009	—N/a	140	1	The pack also includes 13 decorations, 5 materials, 4 objects, 1 sound object, 1 music track and 1 background. Also included in the LittleBigPlanet – Game of the Year Edition.
The Incredibles Costume Kit	8 Apr 2010	8 Apr 2010	8 Apr 2010	8 Apr 2010	9	—N/a	—N/a	Costumes also available separately.
The Incredibles Level Kit	8 Apr 2010	8 Apr 2010	8 Apr 2010	8 Apr 2010	—N/a	86	1	The pack also includes 11 decorations, 9 materials, 6 objects, 1 music track and 1 background.
InFamous Costume	6 Aug 2009	6 Aug 2009	6 Aug 2009	6 Aug 2009	1	—N/a	—N/a	
Jon Burgerman Original Sticker Kit	25 Jun 2009	25 Jun 2009	25 Jun 2009	25 Jun 2009	—N/a	71	—N/a	
Kabuki Actor	4 Dec 2008	4 Dec 2008	4 Dec 2008	4 Dec 2008	1	—N/a	—N/a	
Killzone 2 mini pack	19 Mar 2009	19 Mar 2009	19 Mar 2009	19 Mar 2009	2	32	—N/a	
LittleBigPlanet Cap	12 May 2010	—N/a	—N/a	12 May 2010 (see Notes)	1	—N/a	—N/a	This item could not be purchased normally and was initially only available as a free download to customers that purchased the Qore Episode 24 from the PlayStation Store previewing LittleBigPlanet 2. It was later given to users as a competition reward similarly to the Prize Crown.
LocoRoco Costume Kit	20 Nov 2008	20 Nov 2008	20 Nov 2008	20 Nov 2008	5	—N/a	—N/a	
Mainichi Issho Toro Costume	29 Jan 2009	29 Jan 2009	29 Jan 2009	12 Feb 2009	1	—N/a	—N/a	
Marvel Costume Pack 1	7 Jul 2010	7 Jul 2010	7 Jul 2010	7 Jul 2010	5	—N/a	—N/a	Includes costumes for Thing, Iron Man, Doctor Octopus, Mystique and Daredevil.
Marvel Costume Pack 2	20 Jul 2010	Jul 2010	21 Jul 2010	20 Jul 2010	5	—N/a	—N/a	Includes costumes for Spider-Man, Human Torch, Elektra, Ghost Rider and Thor.
Marvel Costume Pack 3	4 Aug 2010	4 Aug 2010	4 Aug 2010	4 Aug 2010	5	—N/a	—N/a	Includes costumes for Captain America, Wolverine, Invisible Woman, Rogue, Venom.
Marvel Costume Pack 4	18 Aug 2010	18 Aug 2010	18 Aug 2010	18 Aug 2010	5	—N/a	—N/a	Includes costumes for Green Goblin, Hulk, Magneto, the Punisher, Storm.
Marvel Level Pack	7 Jul 2010	7 Jul 2010	7 Jul 2010	7 Jul 2010	—N/a	156	4	Also contains 3 Marvel-themed music tracks, 5 objects, 6 materials, 12 decorations and a "Rooftop" level background.
Metal Gear Solid Premium Character Pack	23 Dec 2008	24 Dec 2008	24 Dec 2008	23 Dec 2008	4	—N/a	—N/a	Costumes also available separately and included in the LittleBigPlanet – Game of the Year Edition.
Metal Gear Solid Level Pack	23 Dec 2008	24 Dec 2008	24 Dec 2008	23 Dec 2008	1	72	6	Pack also includes 12 materials, 10 decorations, 18 objects 3 background music tracks, 1 interactive music track, 1 sound object and new construction tools (Plasma Ball, Laser Sight, Searchlight, Paintinator and Paint Switch). Also included in the LittleBigPlanet – Game of the Year Edition.
ModNation Racers Costume Pack	25 May 2010	25 May 2010	25 May 2010	25 May 2010	1	20	—N/a	
The Monkey King Costume	16 Apr 2009	16 Apr 2009	16 Apr 2009	16 Apr 2009	1	—N/a	—N/a	
Monsters Costume Pack	21 May 2009	21 May 2009	21 May 2009	21 May 2009	4	—N/a	—N/a	Also included in the LittleBigPlanet – Game of the Year Edition.
Monsters Kit	21 May 2009	21 May 2009	21 May 2009	21 May 2009	—N/a	96	1	Kit also contains:4 pieces of scenery, 5 Materials, 26 Decorations, Horror Sounds, 'Party Ghouls' soundtrack and 'Monster Cave' background. Also included in the LittleBigPlanet – Game of the Year Edition.
More Animals Costume Pack	12 May 2010	12 May 2010	12 May 2010	12 May 2010	4	—N/a	—N/a	Pack contains Fly, Peacock, Hippo and Turtle costumes. Individual costumes also available separately.
MotorStorm Costume	6 Nov 2008	6 Nov 2008	6 Nov 2008	13 Nov 2008	1	—N/a	—N/a	
Music Pack 1	8 Oct 2009	8 Oct 2009	8 Oct 2009	8 Oct 2009	—N/a	22	—N/a	Three interactive music tracks
Norse Mythology Mini-pack	7 May 2009	7 May 2009	7 May 2009	7 May 2009	2	10	—N/a	
Patapon Costume	2 Apr 2009	9 Apr 2009	2 Apr 2009	2 Apr 2009	1	—N/a	—N/a	
Pirates of the Caribbean Costume Kit	22 Dec 2009	22 Dec 2009	22 Dec 2009	22 Dec 2009	6	—N/a	—N/a	
Pirates of the Caribbean Premium Level Kit	22 Dec 2009	22 Dec 2009	22 Dec 2009	22 Dec 2009	1	131	6	Pack also includes new level-creation tools allowing the user to incorporate water into their levels, 4 music tracks, 27 objects, 8 materials, 1 sound object and 1 background.
Prize Crown	—N/a	—N/a	—N/a	—N/a	1	—N/a	—N/a	Only provided to specific users and competition winners One crown was auctioned in aid of the Play For Japan campaign to help fund relief efforts following the Japanese earthquake and Tsunami in 2011
Pumpkin head	6 Nov 2008	6 Nov 2008	6 Nov 2008	6 Nov 2008	1	—N/a	—N/a	Re-released on 29 October 2009
Rag Doll Kung Fu	9 Apr 2009	9 Apr 2009	9 Apr 2009	9 Apr 2009	5	36	—N/a	
Rare LittleBigPlanet PSP Launch T-shirt	24 Nov 2009	26 Nov 2009	26 Nov 2009	24 Nov 2009	1	—N/a	—N/a	This item was available for one week. For a small period of time on the Hong Kong PlayStation Store this item was free, although it was not free in most other countries.
Rare LittleBigPlanet PSP Launch Cap	29 Apr 2010	29 Apr 2010	29 Apr 2010	29 Apr 2010	1	—N/a	—N/a	This item was free as an automatically downloadable content pack, but was only made available to those who had already purchased the rare PSP launch T-shirt the week of 24 November 2009.
Rare Week 1 T-shirt	6 Nov 2008	Not released	6 Nov 2008	Not released	1	—N/a	—N/a	Only available during week of game launch. According to Media Molecule, this is the rarest of all costume items and will never be released again. A different Week 1 T-shirt was made available in January 2011 for the Little Big Planet 2 launch.
Resistance 2 'Chimera' Costume	27 Nov 2008	27 Nov 2008	27 Nov 2008	27 Nov 2008	1	—N/a	—N/a	
Sack-Eating Plant Costume	13 Nov 2008	13 Nov 2008	13 Nov 2008	13 Nov 2008	1	—N/a	—N/a	
Sack in the Box Costume	20 Nov 2008	20 Nov 2008	20 Nov 2008	20 Nov 2008	1	—N/a	—N/a	
Sacktue of Liberty Costume	2 Jul 2009	2 Jul 2009	2 Jul 2009	2 Jul 2009	1	—N/a	—N/a	Made available again beginning 29 June 2010 for about one week
Santa Costume	11 Dec 2008	11 Dec 2008	11 Dec 2008	11 Dec 2008	1	—N/a	—N/a	Released in two packs. One containing boots and coat and one containing hat and beard Re-released on 3 December 2009 for roughly thirty days
Solstice Druid Costume	25 Jun 2009	25 Jun 2009	25 Jun 2009	25 Jun 2009	1	—N/a	—N/a	Only available for "a week or two". Made available again beginning 21 June 2010 for about one week
Sonic Costume Pack	25 Mar 2010	25 Mar 2010	25 Mar 2010	25 Mar 2010	5	85	—N/a	Costumes also available separately. Full costume pack also comes with Sonic the Hedgehog themed stickers
Spacesuit	6 Nov 2008	6 Nov 2008	6 Nov 2008	6 Nov 2008	1	—N/a	—N/a	Originally only available during week of game launch. Re-released for the week of the game's one-year anniversary. Released again first week of Little Big Planet 2 release for free. It was also re-released again in the first week of Little Big Planet Vita and Little Big Planet Karting releases.
St Patrick's Day Leprechaun costume	12 Mar 2009	12 Mar 2009	12 Mar 2009	17 Mar 2009	1	—N/a	—N/a	Only available for one week, was re-released on 17 March 2010 also for only one week
Street Fighter II Costume Kit	11 Dec 2008	11 Dec 2008	11 Dec 2008	11 Dec 2008	4	—N/a	—N/a	Costumes also available separately
Team Ico pack	11 Jun 2009	11 Jun 2009	11 Jun 2009	11 Jun 2009	5	13	—N/a	Pack also contains sound effects Costumes also available separately
Turkey Head Costume	27 Nov 2008	27 Nov 2008	27 Nov 2008	27 Nov 2008	1	—N/a	—N/a	
Valentines Day mini pack	5 Feb 2009	5 Feb 2009	5 Feb 2009	5 Feb 2009	2	12	—N/a	The pack also includes 7 decorations, 5 materials and 5 objects. Pack was re-released for Valentine's Day 2010 for only one week
Vera Bee Sticker Pack	27 Aug 2009	27 Aug 2009	27 Aug 2009	27 Aug 2009	—N/a	80	—N/a	
Watchmen Pack	1 Oct 2009	1 Oct 2009	1 Oct 2009	1 Oct 2009	4	56	—N/a	Costumes also available separately
White Knight Chronicles Costume Kit	25 Feb 2010	25 Feb 2010	25 Feb 2010	25 Feb 2010	4	—N/a	—N/a	Costumes also available separately
Wipeout Pack	19 Feb 2009	19 Feb 2009	19 Feb 2009	19 Feb 2009	4	5	—N/a	
