= LittleBigPlanet PS Vita =

2012 video game

- Developers: Double Eleven; Tarsier Studios; XDev
- Publisher: Sony Computer Entertainment
- Artists: Per Bergman; Marcus Ottvall; Sebastian Bastian; Christer Johansson
- Composer: Winifred Phillips
- Series: LittleBigPlanet
- Platform: PlayStation Vita
- Release: EU: 19 September 2012; JP: 20 September 2012; AU: 20 September 2012; NA: 25 September 2012
- Genres: Puzzle-platformer, sandbox
- Modes: Single-player, multiplayer (co-op)

LittleBigPlanet PS Vita is a 2012 puzzle-platform video game developed by Tarsier Studios and Double Eleven and published by Sony Computer Entertainment for the PlayStation Vita. It is the fourth main instalment of the LittleBigPlanet series. The game was announced in January 2011 along with the reveal of the PlayStation Vita console, then known as the Next Generation Portable (NGP), and the first details of the game were revealed on 6 June 2011 at the Electronic Entertainment Expo. It was released on 19 September 2012 in Europe, 20 September 2012 in Japan and Australia, and 25 September 2012 for the North American markets.

The online servers for the game have been permanently shut down in March 2021 due to attacks on the servers during the prior year.

== Gameplay ==
Players can use the touch screen controls to interact directly with the environment.

As in previous titles in the LittleBigPlanet series, players control a character named Sackboy through a variety of worlds utilising the character's various abilities such as jumping and grabbing objects. It also features various non-platforming mini-games. Numerous multiplayer options are available. As well as up to four-player online competitive or co-op gameplay, the PlayStation Vita's multi-touch display can be used by two players for competitive games. "Pass'n'Play" is also available, enabling turn-based gameplay. The Vita's rear touchpanel is also used for pushing objects toward the player, creating platforms out of parts of the world.

=== Content creation ===
Players are able to create their own levels and share them online using the PlayStation Network. The PlayStation Vita's touch-screen display can be used to directly draw objects and platforms in the game world. As well as unique creation tools such as these, the game also includes all of the tools available in LittleBigPlanet 2 (with the exception of its downloadable content tools such as the Wormhole). However, materials and stickers/decorations from prior games are not available in the game. Costumes bought from the PlayStation Network used to customise the player's character are transferable between the PlayStation 3 and PlayStation Vita games, including LittleBigPlanet Karting, through costumes from the PSP game are not available in LittleBigPlanet PS Vita. Content can also be shared over both Wi-Fi and a 3G network.

=== Additional content ===
The PlayStation Vita version of the game has tools from previous versions of LittleBigPlanet that have been adapted to suit the Vita's control system, as well as new tools such as the Motion Recorder, the Touch Sensor, the Touch Tweaker, the Touch Cursor, the Touch Material and the Layer Tool, all of which provide players with touch controls. There are also tools used for other purposes such as the Dephysicalise Tool, the Sticker Scrubber and a tool that makes a jelly like substance that Sackboy can pass through. Another new tool, the Memoriser, can store data between levels and play sessions.

A bonus with BioShock costumes was included to those who pre-ordered the game. The pack includes a costume of a Big Daddy and a Little Sister. A "Knights of Old" Pack was also announced, allowing to dress as a knight, dragon or a princess.

== Plot ==
The story involves a puppeteer who is believed to control wooden puppets called "The Hollows" which are dangerous enemies of Carnivalia. They were created by him as replacements for the puppets he threw away due to being booed at a circus event. In order to stop the threat, Sackboy travels through various locations such as La Marionetta, the Land of Odd, Jackpot City and Coaster Valley and meets various characters who assist him in reaching the Spooky Mansion, where the Puppeteer is known to live.

When he reaches the mansion, it is discovered that the Puppeteer, named Franklin according to a tape recording, was captured by his own Hollows. After being saved by Sackboy, he reveals the Hollows were merely an unwanted creation made during an attempt to recreate his puppet friends, who are the same Creator Curators Sackboy met while aiming for the mansion. Due to growing bitterness from always being behind the scenes, he had thrown them away, and when he later tried to find them he shed a tear that brought them to life. Franklin is ecstatic about reuniting with his now alive friends, and afterwards they laugh so hard, the Hollows revert to their original Sackperson forms.

== Reception ==
Reception

Aggregate scores
Aggregator	Score
GameRankings	88.68%
Metacritic	88/100

Review scores
Publication	Score
Eurogamer	8/10
Famitsu	94
Game Informer	8.75/10
GameSpot	8.5/10
GamesRadar+	4.5/5
GameTrailers	8.5/10
IGN	9/10
PlayStation Official Magazine – UK	9/10

LittleBigPlanet PS Vita received positive reviews, garnering aggregated scores of 88/100 at Metacritic and 88.68% at GameRankings.

Justin Calvert from GameSpot called the game the best in the series so far and stated: "This is the game that your Vita has been waiting for. For months, the shiny handheld has been aching to show you what it's really capable of, and with the arrival of Little Big Planet PS Vita, it finally has an opportunity to do so." Calvert, who gave the game an 8.5 out if 10, praised the "wonderfully varied" story levels, "excellent" controls, and the "easier than ever" creation tools, but disliked tutorials for feeling incomplete.

Matt Helgeson of Game Informer wrote: "While LittleBigPlanet has clearly settled into a comfortable groove, it's still one of the best pure platformers on the market. LittleBigPlanet PS Vita is another stellar entry on Sackboy's impressive resume." Helgeson awarded the game an 8.75/10 and spoke well of the overall design, the graphics, the soundtrack, and the developers' ability to create a LittleBigPlanet game on par with the main games.

In his review, IGN's Greg Miller concluded: "LittleBigPlanet PS Vita is the definitive LittleBigPlanet game. It's everything you loved (or possibly didn't) from the past games boiled down into a package you can play anywhere at any time. You can collect prize bubbles while watching TV, download user-created levels at home and then play them on a plane, and sink the hours into learning create mode via 10-minute chunks at the Laundromat. Then, there's all the new stuff like touch controls, games that don't involve Sackboy, and the creation potential that could give you an endless supply of free games. Yes, the jumping is still floaty, the creation complicated and the load times a bit too long, but that doesn't stop LittleBigPlanet PS Vita from being an amazing experience."

Sophia Tong of GamesRadar commended the narration by Stephen Fry, the controls, and the story levels, saying: "LittleBigPlanet PS Vita encapsulates what the system can do, and deserves a spot in your Vita library. Running through each level (even multiple times) is a charming, creative, and incredibly rewarding experience, regardless of whether it's to beat your friend's leaderboard score or if you're simply going after every collectible for that satisfying "pop" sound. Even when you feel like you've exhausted all your minigame options, what you can create in the Imagisphere with the game's powerful toolset is only limited by your imagination."

=== Awards ===
Year	Institution	Award	Result
2012	Gamescom Awards	Best Mobile Game	Won
2012	TIGA Games Industry Awards	Game of the Year	Won
2012	IGN Game Awards	Vita Game of the Year	Won
2013	Pocket Gamer Awards	PS Vita Game of the Year	Won

== DLC ==
Similar to the other entries on the franchise, several DLCs have been released for this PS Vita game. The costume packs for LBP and LBP 2 are compatible with the PS Vita edition, while some Level Packs were made specifically for this version.

- LittleBigPlanet PS Vita: DC Comics Premium Level Pack, a collection of six levels with a DC Comics background story.
