= List of LittleBigPlanet 2 downloadable content packs =

LittleBigPlanet 2 (commonly abbreviated as LBP2) is a puzzle-platform game centred on user-generated content. The game was developed by Media Molecule, published by Sony Computer Entertainment Europe for PlayStation 3 and was released in January 2011.

Media Molecule has released numerous downloadable content (DLC) packs on the PlayStation Store. All DLC packs released for LittleBigPlanet are also compatible with the sequel, but those designed for LittleBigPlanet 2 are not available in the first game. All costumes from both LittleBigPlanet and LittleBigPlanet 2 are compatible with the PlayStation Vita version of the game, along with LittleBigPlanet Karting. The content of the game's DLC packs vary but include costumes, stickers, decorations, objects, music, creation tools and new levels. Some of these packs are available free of charge while others are available to purchase. Much of the development of LittleBigPlanet's DLC is outsourced by Media Molecule to their development partners, Tarsier Studios, Fireproof Games and Supermassive Games. The packs announced to date are listed below.

== Costume packs ==
Costume packs contain a selection of pre-assembled costumes as well as individual wearable items that can be combined with other pieces.

Pack name and citation	First released	Australia	Europe	North America	Costumes	Notes
DC Comics Costume Pack 1 →	17 Dec 2013	18 Dec 2013	18 Dec 2013	17 Dec 2013	5	Pack contains: Superman, Supergirl, Lex Luthor, Brainiac and Bizarro.
DC Comics Costume Pack 2 →	8 Jan 2014	8 Jan 2014	8 Jan 2014	8 Jan 2014	5	Pack contains: Batman Joker, Harley Quinn, Poison Ivy and Batgirl.
DC Comics Costume Pack 3 →	8 Jan 2014	8 Jan 2014	8 Jan 2014	8 Jan 2014	5	Pack contains: Green Lantern, Sinestro, Killer Frost, Catwoman and Aquaman.
DC Comics Costume Pack 4 →	12 Feb 2014	12 Feb 2014	12 Feb 2014	12 Feb 2014	5	Pack contains: SHAZAM!, Solomon Grundy, The Flash, Wonder Woman and Zatanna.
The Electric Mayhem Costume Pack →	21 Dec 2011	22 Dec 2011	22 Dec 2011	21 Dec 2011	5	Pack contains: Animal, Dr. Teeth, Zoot, Janice and Sgt. Floyd Pepper costumes
Escape Plan Costume →	25 Apr 2012	25 Apr 2012	25 Apr 2012	25 Apr 2012	1	
Final Fantasy VII Costume Pack →	12 Jul 2011	13 Jul 2011	13 Jul 2011	12 Jul 2011	5	Contains Sephiroth, Cloud, Aerith, Tifa and Vincent costumes.
Gonzo Costume →	—N/a	—N/a	—N/a	—N/a	1	Available as a pre-order incentive from selected retailers and included in Collector's Edition. Also included in Muppets Costume Pack 2.
Jak & Daxter Costume Pack →	22 Mar 2011	23 Mar 2011	23 Mar 2011	22 Mar 2011	2	Also available as a pre-order bonus in Europe and North America and in the North American Collector's Edition.
Mariachi Costume (for Cinco de Mayo) →	31 May 2011	1 Jun 2011	1 Jun 2011	31 May 2011	1	Free costume that was available for one week only.
Marvel Costume Pack →	Dec 2012	Dec 2012	Dec 2012	Dec 2012	5	Includes costumes for Black Widow, Star-Lord, Iron Fist, Nova and Black Bolt.
Marvel Costume Pack →	Jan 2013	Jan 2013	Jan 2013	Jan 2013	5	Includes costumes for Sabretooth, Black Cat, Deadpool, Doctor Doom and Hawkeye.
The Muppets Costume Pack 1 →	6 Dec 2011	7 Dec 2011	7 Dec 2011	6 Dec 2011	4	Pack contains: Kermit the Frog, Fozzie Bear, Beaker and Dr. Bunsen Honeydew costumes
The Muppets Costume Pack 2 →	13 Dec 2011	14 Dec 2011	14 Dec 2011	13 Dec 2011	4	Pack contains: Miss Piggy, Statler, Waldorf and Great Gonzo
The Muppets Costume Pack 3 →	see The Electric Mayhem Costume Pack					
New Year Fireworks Costume →	10 Jan 2012	11 Jan 2012	11 Jan 2012	10 Jan 2012	1	Available for one week only.
Oddworld: Munch Costume →	29 Nov 2011	30 Nov 2011	30 Nov 2011	29 Nov 2011	1	Costume from Munch's Oddysee in time for a HD remake PSN release.
Oddworld: Stranger Costume →	8 Nov 2011	9 Nov 2011	9 Nov 2011	8 Nov 2011	1	Costume from Stranger's Wrath in time for a HD remake release.
The Killjoy Costume Pack	—N/a	—N/a	—N/a	—N/a	4	Pack Contains: The Killjoy, Makariy, The Flamingo and Bloodsucker.
Perseids Costume →	9 Aug 2011	10 Aug 2011	10 Aug 2011	9 Aug 2011	1	Available for a limited time.
Rare LBP2 Week 1 T-shirt →	18 Jan 2011	—N/a	19 Jan 2011	18 Jan 2011	1	Only available during week of game launch.
Ratchet & Clank Costume Pack →	22 Mar 2011	23 Mar 2011	23 Mar 2011	22 Mar 2011	2	Also available as a pre-order bonus in Europe and North America and in the North American Collector's Edition.
Sly Cooper & Bentley Costume Pack →	22 Mar 2011	23 Mar 2011	23 Mar 2011	22 Mar 2011	2	
Tearaway Minipack →	26 Feb 2014	26 Feb 2014	26 Feb 2014	26 Feb 2014	2	Pack Contains: iota and atoi
The Nightmare Before Christmas Costume Pack →	23 Oct 2013	23 Oct 2013	23 Oct 2013	23 Oct 2013	4	Pack Contains: Jack Skellington, Sally, Dr. Finkelstein and Oogie Boogie.
Toy Story Alien Costume →	—N/a	—N/a	—N/a	—N/a	1	Available as a pre-order incentive from selected retailers and included in Collector's Edition. Also included in Toy Story Level Kit.
Toy Story Costume Pack →	2 Jul 2011	3 Jul 2011	3 Jul 2011	2 Jul 2011	4	Pack contains: Buzz Lightyear, Rex, Hamm, Slinky Dog
Toy Story 2 Costume Pack →	16 Aug 2011	17 Aug 2011	17 Aug 2011	16 Aug 2011	4	Pack contains: Woody, Jessie, Stinky Pete, Emperor Zurg
Toy Story 3 Costume Pack 3 →	30 Aug 2011	31 Aug 2011	31 Aug 2011	30 Aug 2011	4	Pack contains: Dolly, Trixie, Lots-O’-Huggin’ Bear, Mr. Pricklepants
Clu Costume →	—N/a	—N/a	—N/a	—N/a	1	Available as a pre-order incentive from selected retailers and included in the Collector's Edition. Later added as part of the Tron: Legacy Minipack in 2012 as Clu.
World Peace Day Costume →	6 Sep 2011	7 Sep 2011	7 Sep 2011	6 Sep 2011	1	Available for 1 week.

== Creator kits and mini-packs ==
Creator kits are themed bundles including a number of stickers, decorations and objects. Mini-packs are usually based on other entertainment franchises and contain up to four costumes and a selection of themed stickers and decorations.

Pack name and citation	First released	Australia	Europe	North America	Costumes	Stickers	Notes
7-Eleven Slurpee T-shirt →	22 Mar 2011	—N/a	—N/a	22 Mar 2011	1	11	Promotional offer at participating 7-Eleven stores in North America, by collecting four limited edition Sackboy Slurpee cups.
Cats Costume Pack →	6 Jun 2011	8 Jun 2011	8 Jun 2011	6 Jun 2011	4	16	
Deep Sea Adventures Costume Pack →	7 Mar 2012	7 Mar 2012	7 Mar 2012	7 Mar 2012	4	11	Deep Sea Diver, Edible crab, Anglerfish, Pufferfish
Dogs Costume Pack →	6 Jun 2011	8 Jun 2011	8 Jun 2011	6 Jun 2011	4	17	
Even More Animals Costume Pack →	8 Mar 2011	9 Mar 2011	9 Mar 2011	8 Mar 2011	1	20	Also available as a pre-order incentive from selected retailers and in the Collector's Edition.
Ezio Costume from Assassin's Creed: Revelations →	15 Nov 2011	16 Nov 2011	16 Nov 2011	15 Nov 2011	1	20	
Infamous 2 Mini-pack →	5 Jul 2011	6 Jul 2011	6 Jul 2011	5 Jul 2011	2	20	
Invizimals Costume Pack →	25 Oct 2011	26 Oct 2011	26 Oct 2011	25 Oct 2011	4	17	Contains Flameclaw, Icelion, Metalmutt and Tigershark costumes and stickers
Journey Costume Pack →	25 Apr 2012	25 Apr 2012	25 Apr 2012	25 Apr 2012	1	11	
Killzone 3 Mini-pack →	12 July 2011	20 July 2011	20 July 2011	12 July 2011	2	14	Contains Rico and Hazmat Trooper costumes.
MotorStorm: Apocalypse Mini-pack →	6 Apr 2011	6 Apr 2011	6 Apr 2011	6 Jun 2011	2	22	
Nathan Drake Mini-pack →	1 Nov 2011	2 Nov 2011	2 Nov 2011	1 Nov 2011	1	13	
Summer Creator Kit →	27 Jun 2012	27 Jun 2012	27 Jun 2012	27 Jun 2012	—N/a	26	Includes four objects, four decorations, and a new material.
Spring Creator Kit →	21 Mar 2011	21 Mar 2011	21 Mar 2011	21 Mar 2011	—N/a		Pack Contains: Objects, Decorations and Stickers until.
Tearaway Competition Pack →	14 Aug 2013	14 Aug 2013	14 Aug 2013	14 Aug 2013	—N/a	36	Pack Contains: 36 Tearaway-themed Stickers and 'Sogport Song (Instrumental)' from Tearaway
Tron: Evolution Mini-pack →	21 Jun 2011	22 Jun 2011	22 Jun 2011	21 Jun 2011	2	31	
Tron: Legacy Minipack	13 Jun 2012	13 Jun 2012	13 Jun 2012	13 Jun 2012	3	9	
Weekend Pursuits Costume Pack →	12 Oct 2011	13 Oct 2011	13 Oct 2011	12 Oct 2011	4	22	Contains Skiing, Golf, Caving and Angling costumes.
Winter Creator's Kit →	20 Dec 2011	21 Dec 2011	21 Dec 2011	20 Dec 2011	—N/a	22	Pack Contains: 4 Objects, 6 Decorations and 22 Stickers until 27/12/2011.

== Premium level packs ==
Level packs include a series of levels with their own self-contained story. The player can unlock new objects, stickers, decorations, sound effects, music and creation tools by playing and completing the levels.

Pack name and citation	First released	Australia	Europe	North America	Costumes	Stickers	Levels	Notes
Cross-Controller Pack →	19 Dec 2012	19 Dec 2012	19 Dec 2012	19 Dec 2012	5	148	10	Contains: Decorations, Objects, Materials, Sound effects, Backgrounds, Functionality, Music, Stickers, Levels, Costumes, Trophies
DC Comics Premium Level Pack →	17 Dec 2013	18 Dec 2013	18 Dec 2013	17 Dec 2013	2	177	12	Two Bonus Costumes – Cyborg and Cheetah. Pack also contains: A new powerup: The Hero Cape, a new ability: Wall Jumping, two new tools: The Memoriser and Decoration Spinner, 7 additional Materials, 20 Objects, 41 Decorations, 177 Stickers, 7 Music Tracks, 60 Sound Effects and a new Background.
Move Pack: The Rise of the Cakeling →	13 Sep 2011	14 Sep 2011	14 Sep 2011	13 Sep 2011	6	66	12	Pack also contains: A new powerup: The Brain Crane, 3 new gadgets for use with PlayStation Move (The Movinator, The Move Recorder, The Paint Tool), 4 Interactive Music Tracks, 8 Music Sequencer Tracks, a new Sound Object containing 32 new sounds, 17 new Music Sequencer Instruments, 1 level background, 18 Materials, 41 Decorations, 13 Objects
The Muppets Premium Level Kit →	24 Jan 2012	25 Jan 2012	25 Jan 2012	24 Jan 2012	1	219	5	Costume is Rowlf the Dog. Pack also contains: A new material, "Attract-O-Gel" that allows Sackboy to walk on walls, A new level background, 13 Materials, 49 Decorations 4 Objects, 18 Audio & Music Objects, 7 PlayStation Trophies.
The Nightmare Before Christmas Level Kit →	23 Oct 2013	23 Oct 2013	23 Oct 2013	23 Oct 2013	—N/a	100	1	Pack Contains: 5 Objects, 8 Materials, 13 Decorations, 100 Stickers, 1 Interactive Music Track, 1 Sound Object, 1 Background.
Toy Story Level Kit →	2 Jul 2011	3 Jul 2011	3 Jul 2011	2 Jul 2011	1	149	9	Kit also contains: 2 music tracks, 1 interactive music track, 1 background, 5 Materials, 10 Decorations, 6 Objects, Toy Story Alien Costume
