= Tarsier Studios =

Swedish video game developer

Tarsier Studios AB
- Formerly: Team Tarsier (2004–2009)
- Type: Subsidiary
- Industry: Video games
- Founded: 2004; 22 years ago in Karlshamn, Sweden
- Founders: Andreas Johnsson; Björn Sunesson; and 7 others
- Headquarters: Malmö, Sweden
- Key people: Andreas Johnsson (CEO); Oliver Merlöv (COO)
- Products: Little Nightmares Reanimal
- Number of employees: 77 (2022)
- Parent: Amplifier Game Invest (2019–2025); THQ Nordic (2025–present)
- Website: tarsier.se

Tarsier Studios is a Swedish video game developer based in Malmö. The studio is most known for creating the first two Little Nightmares games in collaboration with publisher Bandai Namco Entertainment.

== History ==
Nine developers, including Andreas Johnsson and Björn Sunesson, founded Tarsier Studios in 2004. Johnsson had been a traditional programmer in the 1990s but wished to get into video game programming. With many Swedish universities beginning to offer game development courses, he enrolled at a Karlshamn university, where he got together with the other developers who would found Tarsier Studios. Their puzzle-platform game Tio won a game design contest panelled by video game industry veterans, which landed the team a spot in an incubation programme that would provide aid to advance the game's concept. The team was given an office space but no financial assistance. Mattias Nygren joined Tarsier as its chief executive officer (CEO) in 2006 and the business foundation of the Sparbanken i Karlshamn acquired a significant stake in the studio. They reworked Tio into The City of Metronome and attended E3 2005 to pitch the game to publishers. The team attracted interest from companies including Sony Computer Entertainment but ultimately signed no publishing deal. Tarsier remained in business with work-for-hire projects while working on further prototypes. One physics-based fighting game prototype again attracted the interest of Sony, which hired the team to develop a remake of Rag Doll Kung Fu. This sparked the start of a longer partnership with Sony, with Tarsier creating art assets and later downloadable content packs for LittleBigPlanet. In July 2010, Tarsier signed an exclusivity deal with Sony.

During this time, the team grew to 30 people and moved from Karlshamn to Malmö. The Karlshamn office was retained for continued outsourcing operations, while the Malmö office would house the development of console games. A "super-ambitious" game Tarsier was working on for Sony was put on hold when the studio was offered to develop LittleBigPlanet PS Vita. In June 2013, Nygren bought out the Karlshamn location, saying that it was not feasible for Tarsier to operate two locations at a time. He left Tarsier and installed Ola Holmdahl as its new CEO of the 40-person Malmö studio. Out of the Karlshamn office, Nygren established The Station. Tarsier's next bigger project was the horror game Hunger. The studio initially pitched the game to Sony, but the publisher had much higher ambitions for external projects and declined. Tarsier instead found a publisher in Bandai Namco Entertainment, which invested in the project with the intent of producing multiple games. The deal was announced in August 2016 and Hunger was renamed Little Nightmares. For Sony, Tarsier created the virtual reality game Statik, and the studio worked with Nintendo on The Stretchers.

In December 2019, Tarsier Studios was acquired by Goodbye Kansas Game Invest (later known as Amplifier Game Invest)—an investment company previously bought by Embracer Group—for 99 million kr, of which 88 million kr in cash and 11 million kr in newly issued Class B shares. The deal included the studio's 65 employees and intellectual property, excluding Little Nightmares and The Stretchers, which remained with their respective owners. The transition also brought along staff changes: Tarsier hired Oliver Merlöv, formerly of Massive Entertainment, as its chief operating officer in 2020, as well as Erik Rudelius as its chief people and culture officer. As of 2022, only three of the nine original founders remain with the company.

== Games ==
Year	Title	Platform(s)	Publisher
2008	LittleBigPlanet (DLC)	PlayStation 3	Sony Computer Entertainment
2009	Rag Doll Kung Fu: Fists of Plastic	PlayStation 3	Sony Computer Entertainment
2011	LittleBigPlanet 2 (DLC)	PlayStation 3	Sony Computer Entertainment
2012	LittleBigPlanet PS Vita	PlayStation Vita	Sony Computer Entertainment
2013	DC Comics Premium Level Pack	PlayStation 3	Sony Computer Entertainment
2014	LittleBigPlanet 3	PlayStation 3, PlayStation 4	Sony Computer Entertainment
2015	Tearaway Unfolded	PlayStation 4	Sony Computer Entertainment
2017	Little Nightmares	Microsoft Windows, Nintendo Switch, PlayStation 4, Xbox One	Bandai Namco Entertainment
2017	Statik	PlayStation VR	Tarsier Studios
2019	The Stretchers	Nintendo Switch	Nintendo
2021	Little Nightmares II	Microsoft Windows, Nintendo Switch, PlayStation 4, PlayStation 5, Xbox One, Xbox Series X/S	Bandai Namco Entertainment
2026	Reanimal	Microsoft Windows, Nintendo Switch 2, PlayStation 5, Xbox Series X/S	THQ Nordic

=== Cancelled ===
- The City of Metronome
