= Little Nightmares =

2017 puzzle-solving horror game

- Developer: Tarsier Studios (Note: Ported to Nintendo Switch by Engine Software)
- Publisher: Bandai Namco Entertainment (Note: Ported to Android and iOS by Playdigious)
- Producers: Henrik Larsson; Oscar Wemmert; Emma Mellander
- Designers: Dennis Talajic; Asger Kristiansen
- Programmer: Mattias Ottvall
- Artists: Per Bergman; Christer Johansson; Sebastian Bastian
- Writer: Dave Mervik
- Composers: Tobias Lilja; Christian Vasselbring
- Series: Little Nightmares
- Engine: Unreal Engine 4
- Platforms: Android; Google Stadia; iOS; Nintendo Switch; PlayStation 4; Windows; Xbox One; PlayStation 5; Xbox Series X/S; Nintendo Switch 2
- Release: PlayStation 4, Windows, Xbox One; 28 April 2017; Nintendo Switch; 18 May 2018; Stadia; 1 June 2020; Android, iOS; 12 December 2023; Nintendo Switch 2, PlayStation 5, Xbox Series X/S; 10 October 2025
- Genre: Puzzle-platform
- Mode: Single-player

Little Nightmares is a puzzle-platform horror adventure game developed by Tarsier Studios and published by Bandai Namco Entertainment. Set in a mysterious world, it follows the journey of Six, a hungry little girl who must escape the Maw, an underwater vessel inhabited by monstrous beings. The game was released in April 2017 for PlayStation 4, Windows and Xbox One. A Nintendo Switch version was released in May 2018, followed by a Google Stadia version in June 2020. Mobile versions were released in December 2023 and published by Playdigious. An upgraded version of the game, titled Little Nightmares Enhanced Edition, was released in 2025.

Little Nightmares received positive reviews upon release, with critics praising its atmosphere, art design, and sound. The game is the first entry in the Little Nightmares universe, which includes the prequel Little Nightmares II (2021), and the third game in the series, Little Nightmares III (2025), developed by Supermassive Games.

== Plot ==
Six, a nine-year-old girl in a yellow raincoat, awakens from a dream of a woman wearing a kimono and a Noh mask. Equipped with only a lighter, she sneaks through the bowels of the Maw, a massive, underwater iron vessel. Throughout the Maw, she encounters Nomes: small, skittish creatures that either flee from her or passively observe her efforts. In the Prison, where captured children are held, Six evades carnivorous Leeches that infest its depths and artificial eye sentries that will turn her to stone if she is caught in their lights. She also regularly experiences debilitating bouts of hunger; whenever she eats, a shadowy, flickering version of herself appears nearby. Six eats some meat left in a cage as a trap and is captured by the blind, long-armed Janitor who supervises the children. She escapes but makes no effort to help the other children. She falls into a room filled with piles of shoes and evades the unseen monster moving underneath. The Janitor eventually corners Six, but she severs his arms with a collapsing door.

Caught by another bout of hunger, Six is forced to eat a live rat. She travels to the Kitchen, where children wrapped up in butcher paper are being sent. Here, the grotesque Twin Chefs are preparing a feast and Six escapes them. She makes her way outside to the hull of the Maw, above the ocean waves. Scaling the hull, Six witnesses the morbidly obese, suited Guests marching into the Maw from a separate vessel. They lumber into the Japanese-style Guest Area, where they gorge themselves on food. The feast is overseen by the mysterious Lady from Six's dream, the masked proprietress of the Maw. When Six has another hunger attack, a Nome offers her a sausage. However, Six eats the Nome instead.

Six follows the Lady up into her Quarters, which are strewn with broken mirrors. Pursued by the Lady, Six finds an unbroken mirror, which she uses to repel her. The sight of her own reflection causes the Lady pain and subdues her. As the Lady lies defenseless, Six experiences a final hunger attack. She bites the Lady's neck, killing her and absorbing her powers. Six walks back through the Guest Area, surrounded by a dark magic aura that drains the lives of the Guests she passes. She proceeds up a staircase and out into the sunlight.

In a post-credits scene, Six waits by the entrance of the Maw while a foghorn is heard in the distance.

=== Secrets of the Maw ===
A trio of DLC levels that offer a "different perspective on Six's adventures" was planned. The first was released in July 2017, the second in November 2017, and the third in February 2018. The levels feature more emphasis on puzzles, rather than platforming, and explain unrevealed elements of the plot.

==== The Depths ====
A boy called the Runaway Kid wakes up from a nightmare involving him swimming in darkness before being dragged underwater. After leaving the Nursery, he follows a girl who is also fleeing but later disappears. She leaves behind a flashlight, which the Runaway Kid takes.

The Runaway Kid falls into the flooded Depths of the Maw. He avoids Leeches and makes his way across by hopping on floating platforms. The Depths are home to the Granny, who swims underwater and attempts to grab the Runaway Kid either by bumping/destroying the platforms he stands on or by snatching him if he is in the water for too long. After pushing a plugged TV set into the water to electrocute the Granny, the Runaway Kid leaves the Depths but is then captured by the Janitor. The ending shows the Runaway Kid in a cage next to other trapped children, including Six. The Janitor pulls the Runaway Kid's cage away, paralleling Six's main-game story just before she wakes up in her cage.

==== The Hideaway ====
Wrapped in butcher paper and ascending on a hook towards the Kitchen, the Runaway Kid breaks free and falls into another level of the Maw, finding an engine room where Nomes throw coal into a furnace. After evading the Janitor, the Kid uses the Nomes to power up the furnace. The bucket elevator in the engine room becomes fully functional and lifts the Runaway Kid up to a small furnace room where more Nomes are gathered, their shadows cast by the furnace's light resembling children. After leaving, the Runaway Kid finds himself on top of a rising elevator occupied by the Lady.

==== The Residence ====
The Runaway Kid enters the Lady's Residence. He fights the Shadow Children and eventually finds the Lady looking at herself in a mirror, her unmasked face in the reflection shown to be gruesome and deformed. The Lady is alerted to the Runaway Kid's presence and transforms him into a Nome. He reaches the Guest Area and the room with the sausage in Six's story. The chapter ends with the Runaway Kid standing by the sausage, indicating that he is the Nome whom Six eats. When the credits for Secrets of the Maw roll, they are eventually shown to be on a television set, which shows a figure reminiscent of the Thin Man.

== Development ==
With the game, the team wanted to explore the "wild extremes" of childhood. The game's setting, the Maw, was created as a piece of concept art "where all the worst things in the world could be left to rot". In keeping with the theme of childhood, the team opted against creating a powerful protagonist. While the gameplay has been described as stealth-based, the team prefers to describe it as "hide and seek" feeling that even the term "stealth" gives the impression of an empowered character.

The game was originally announced by Tarsier Studios in May 2014 under the title Hunger, with no known publisher for release on PlayStation 4. After a teaser trailer in February 2015, nothing was heard of the project until August 2016, when Bandai Namco Entertainment announced that they had entered into a worldwide publishing agreement with Tarsier for the project, which was now re-titled Little Nightmares. The team opted to change the name to differentiate it from The Hunger Games series thus making it easier to search for.

== Reception ==
Reception

Aggregate score
Aggregator	Score
Metacritic	PC: 81/100; PS4: 78/100; XONE: 83/100; NS: 79/100

Review scores
Publication	Score
Destructoid	8.5/10
Game Informer	9/10
GameRevolution	3.5/5
GameSpot	8/10
GamesRadar+	4/5
IGN	8.8/10
PC Gamer (US)	78/100
Polygon	8.5/10
VideoGamer.com	9/10

Little Nightmares received critical acclaim. Review aggregator Metacritic, which applies a weighted average to reviews on its website, reports "generally favorable" reviews.

Cory Arnold said on Destructoid "Little Nightmares hypnotized me with ever-present suspense," and awarded it a score of 8.5/10. Jonathan Leack from Game Revolution gave the game a score of 3 out of 5 stars saying that "Little Nightmares appears to have a double meaning. On one hand, the gameplay is a nightmare, regularly testing your patience and will to push forward. On the other, the atmosphere and audio design prove terrifying in a way that horror fiends will admire. There's an equal amount of qualities to like and dislike, but when it comes down to it Little Nightmares succeeds at delivering on its promise of being an interesting horror game unlike anything else."

Sam Prell of GamesRadar+ awarded it 4 out of 5 stars stating that "At times mechanically clumsy, but artistically sound, Little Nightmares might get on your nerves every once in a while, but its imagery will burrow into your brain and never leave." Joe Skrebels's score of 8.8/10 on IGN said that "gleefully strange, unceasingly grim, and quietly smart, Little Nightmares is a very welcome fresh take on horror." "An okay platformer but a deeply imaginative horror game, Little Nightmares is worth playing for its array of disturbing imagery," was Samuel's Roberts's conclusion on PC Gamer with a score of 78/100.

Whitney Reynolds gave Little Nightmares an 8.5/10 score on Polygon with the consensus: "Little Nightmares worked its way into my dreams because it's just bright enough, just safe enough to make me let my guard down. The game isn't always successful at balancing some game design fundamentals. But when the lights went out, it left me remembering that, really, I'm just a small thing in a dangerous world myself. Also, that monsters with big long grabby arms are really, really creepy." Alice Bell's 9/10 score on VideoGamer.com stated that "Little Nightmares is frightening, in a way that gets under your skin. A way that whispers in your ear that you won't sleep well tonight. Little Nightmares takes things you were afraid of when you were a kid, and reminds you you're still afraid now."

Eurogamer ranked the game 28th on their list of the "Top 50 Games of 2017", and GamesRadar+ ranked it 20th on their list of the 25 Best Games of 2017, while Polygon ranked it 27th on their list of the 50 best games of 2017. It was nominated for "Best Platformer" and "Best Art Direction" in IGN's Best of 2017 Awards.

=== Sales ===
The game debuted at No. 4 on the UK all-format sales chart in its first week. The Complete Edition sold 12,817 copies within its first week in Japan, placing it at No. 15 on the all-format sales chart. As of August 2018, the game has sold over one million copies across all platforms. In May 2020, Bandai Namco announced that more than 2 million units have been sold.

=== Accolades ===
Year	Award	Category	Result	Ref.
2016	Gamescom 2016	Indie Award	Won	
2017	Develop Awards	New Games IP	Nominated	
2017	Golden Joystick Awards	Best Visual Design	Nominated	
2017	Golden Joystick Awards	Best Audio	Nominated	
2018	21st Annual D.I.C.E. Awards	Outstanding Achievement in Art Direction	Nominated	
2018	Emotional Games Awards 2018	Best Emotional Music	Nominated	
2018	National Academy of Video Game Trade Reviewers Awards	Animation, Artistic	Nominated	
2018	National Academy of Video Game Trade Reviewers Awards	Art Direction, Contemporary	Nominated	
2018	National Academy of Video Game Trade Reviewers Awards	Game Design, New IP	Nominated	
2018	National Academy of Video Game Trade Reviewers Awards	Lighting/Texturing	Nominated	
2018	National Academy of Video Game Trade Reviewers Awards	Original Dramatic Score, New IP	Nominated	
2018	National Academy of Video Game Trade Reviewers Awards	Use of Sound, New IP	Nominated	
