= Embracer Group =

Swedish video game and media holding company

Embracer Group AB
- Logo in use since September 2019
- Formerly: Nordic Games Licensing AB (2011–2016); THQ Nordic AB (2016–2019)
- Type: Public
- Traded as: Nasdaq Stockholm: EMBRAC B
- ISIN: SE0013121589
- Industry: Video games
- Founded: 2011; 15 years ago
- Founder: Lars Wingefors
- Headquarters: Karlstad, Sweden
- Key people: Lars Wingefors (chairman); Phil Rogers (CEO); Müge Bouillon (CFO)
- Revenue: ▲42.780 billion kr (2024)
- Operating income: ▼ -20.519 billion kr (2024)
- Net income: ▼ -18.177 billion kr (2024)
- Total assets: ▼85.694 billion kr (2024)
- Total equity: ▼48.939 billion kr (2024)
- Number of employees: 6,090 (2026)
- Parent: Nordic Games Group (2011–2016)
- Divisions: Embracer; Fellowship Entertainment
- Subsidiaries: See § Subsidiaries
- Website: embracer.com

Embracer Group AB (formerly Nordic Games Licensing AB and THQ Nordic AB) is a Swedish video game and media holding company based in Karlstad. The company comprises two operating segments currently: Embracer and Fellowship Entertainment.

Embracer Group was established as Nordic Games Licensing within Nordic Games Group in 2011. The latter had previously purchased assets from the bankrupt publisher JoWooD and established Nordic Games GmbH (a subsidiary of Nordic Games Licensing) to manage them. Nordic Games Licensing continued to purchase intellectual property from defunct publishers, notably several THQ products in 2013, followed by the "THQ" trademark in 2014. In August 2016, Nordic Games Licensing and Nordic Games GmbH changed their names to THQ Nordic. The parent company became a public company in 2016 and changed its name to Embracer Group in 2019. Until 2023, Embracer Group rapidly grew through major acquisitions and investments. After a US$2 billion investment unexpectedly fell through, the company was more than $2 billion in debt and began closing and selling multiple studios and while laying off people at others.

On 22 April 2024, Embracer Group announced its intention to transform into four standalone publicly listed entities on Nasdaq Stockholm within the next two years: a board game segment under the Asmodee group, an indie games segment under Coffee Stain Group, and a segment to manage its library of licensed intellectual properties including that of Tolkien's Middle-earth under Fellowship Entertainment, with new holding company Embracer AB acting as an active and supportive long-term shareholder of all four entities, the current Embracer Group would hold the remaining assets and would rebrand to Embracer.

== History ==
=== The original Nordic Games as video game retailer (1990s–2004) ===
The Swedish entrepreneur Lars Wingefors (born 1977) started several sales businesses during his teenage years, including the second-hand comic book seller LW Comics at age 13, which made close to 300,000 kr annually. At age 16, Wingefors founded Nordic Games to sell used video games by mail order; which generated 5 million kr in revenue in this first year. With growing income post 1994, Nordic Games was turned into a retail chain and opened seven locations across Sweden. In 1998, the company acquired Spel- & Tele shopen, a store in Linköping that Pelle Lundborg had opened at age 16 in 1994.

Towards the end of the 1990s, Nordic Games was suffering from a poor corporate structure. Although Wingefors was asked to either seek new partners or bring in venture capital, he opted to sell the company to Gameplay Stockholm, the Swedish subsidiary of Europe-wide retailer Gameplay.com. In March 2000 for stock valued at £5.96 million, with Wingefors becoming part of the European management. Under Gameplay.com, Nordic Games failed to generate much revenue. It tried to establish mobile game, digital distribution and cable TV box businesses, all of which did not gain traction. When the dot-com bubble burst, Gameplay.com faced financial issues, and Nordic Games was sold back to Wingefors in May 2001 for a symbolic sum of 1 kr. Wingefors brought in venture capitalists and reformed the company to only sell newly released games, but the company faced strong competition and finally filed for bankruptcy in 2004.

=== The new Nordic Games as video game publisher (2004–2011) ===
Wingefors invested the money he had left into a new limited company and, together with potential customers acting as investors, reformed Nordic Games under the name Game Outlet Europe. The new company saw success with purchasing unsold inventory from larger video game companies (such as Electronic Arts), repackaging them on pallets in its Karlstad headquarters, and selling them on the international market and through other retail chains, including Jula, Coop, and ICA. In December 2008, Nordic Games Publishing was established as the video game publishing subsidiary of Game Outlet Europe. The subsidiary started out with seven people, including primary shareholder Wingefors, based in Karlstad, and chief executive officer Lundborg, who had since moved to Málaga with his wife. Nik Blower in London was added to the management team in February 2010.

The idea behind Nordic Games Publishing was to invest in the development of games that would fill gaps in the video game market. Wingefors and Lundborg had noticed that the line-up of games for Nintendo platforms was lacking karaoke games similar to SingStar, which was exclusive to PlayStation consoles. Based on 100-page requirement documents from Nintendo, which included that the game's microphones should be produced by Logitech, and four months of research at a karaoke bar in Watford, England, Nordic Games Publishing assembled a song list for a prospective game and started producing what would later become We Sing. Around this time, Nordic Games Publishing also released Dance Party Club Hits, a dance game that came bundled with a dancing mat. In 2009, Nordic Games Publishing had a turnover of 50 million kr, of which 75% were accounted for by sales of We Sing. For 2010, the company projected a turnover of 200 million kr, while at the same time, Lundborg was looking for new investors to make the company independent of Game Outlet Europe. By March 2011, Nordic Games Holding had been established as a holding company, with Game Outlet Europe and Nordic Games Publishing aligned as its subsidiaries.

=== Nordic Games as holding for acquisitions and expansion (2011–2018) ===
Former logo of THQ Nordic AB (2016–2019)

In June 2011, Nordic Games Holding acquired the assets of the insolvent publisher JoWooD and its subsidiaries. The acquired assets were transferred to Nordic Games GmbH, a newly established subsidiary office in Vienna, Austria. Several former JoWooD employees were hired by Nordic Games GmbH to work on the backlog sales of former JoWooD properties, and Nordic Games Publishing was integrated into Nordic Games GmbH to facilitate publishing operations. Nordic Games Licensing AB, also established in 2011, became the holding company within Nordic Games Holding (later known as Nordic Games Group), as well as the parent company of Nordic Games GmbH. Nordic Games acquired the Scandinavian business of retailer Game in May 2012. In April 2013, Nordic Games Licensing bought several assets of the bankrupt publisher THQ to be managed by Nordic Games GmbH. It obtained the "THQ" trademark in June 2014, intending to use the name as a publishing label for its THQ properties. Subsequently, in August 2016, the company changed its name to THQ Nordic, while Nordic Games GmbH became THQ Nordic GmbH. According to Wingefors and THQ Nordic GmbH's Reinhard Pollice, the name change was undergone to capitalise on the good reputation of THQ's past, although they avoided naming the companies just "THQ" to avoid connections to the bankrupt publisher's more recent troubled history.

THQ Nordic undertook its initial public offering on 22 November 2016 and became a public company listed on the Nasdaq First North stock exchange, being valuated at 1.9 billion kr, while Wingefors retained a 50% ownership in the company. In February 2018, THQ Nordic acquired the Austrian multimedia company Koch Media, which operated the Deep Silver video game label, for €121 million. Koch Media was set to operate independently under THQ Nordic, separate from THQ Nordic GmbH. To better reflect its holding function and to avoid confusion between THQ Nordic and its Viennese office, THQ Nordic stated that it planned to rename itself in the future. In June 2018, the company issued 7.7 million new Class B shares to raise US$168 million for future acquisitions. The company bought the Coffee Stain group, including houses developer Coffee Stain Studios, for 317 million kr in cash. Coffee Stain became THQ Nordic's "third leg", operating independently like Koch Media. Through the two acquisitions and continued sales from THQ Nordic GmbH, THQ Nordic's net sales rose by 713%, to $447.6 million, in its 2018 fiscal year. In December 2018, GamesIndustry.biz named Wingefors as one of their People of the Year.

=== Holding rebranded as Embracer Group and rapid growth (2019–2022) ===
In February 2019, THQ Nordic issued 11 million new Class B shares and raised 2.09 billion kr. At the end of its first fiscal quarter of 2019, THQ Nordic bought Game Outlet Europe for 10 million kr from Nordic Games Group, which was still majority-owned by Wingefors. THQ Nordic then bought the investment arm of Goodbye Kansas, Goodbye Kansas Game Invest (GKGI), and its investments in five startup developers—Palindrome Interactive, Fall Damage, Neon Giant, Kavalri Games and Framebunker—for 42.4 million kr. GKGI was later rebranded Amplifier Game Invest to reflect its new ownership.

To avoid further confusion with THQ Nordic GmbH and clarify its position as a holding company, THQ Nordic assumed the name "Embracer Group" at its annual general meeting on 17 September 2019, while the branch in Vienna retained its name. In the following months, Embracer made several acquisitions and openings: Amplifier Game Invest bought Tarsier Studios for 99 million kr. in December 2019 and opened River End Games and C77 Entertainment in January 2020. Embracer Group acquired Saber Interactive and its five satellite studios in February 2020 for a $525 million to establish its fifth operative group. Saber co-founders Matthew Karch and Andrey Iones became Embracer's largest shareholders after Wingefors, with Karch joining the board. The holding raised $164 million in April 2020 for future expansion and bought Deca Games as its sixth operative group for €25 million in August 2020. In the same month, the Embracer Group announced the acquisitions of Palindrome Interactive, Rare Earth Games and Vermila Studios under Amplifier Game Invest, 4A Games and New World Interactive under Saber Interactive, Pow Wow Entertainment under THQ Nordic, and Sola Media under Koch Media's film division. By November, the company had also purchased 34BigThings, Mad Head Games, Nimble Giant Entertainment, Sandbox Strategies, Snapshot Games and Zen Studios via Saber Interactive, A Thinking Ape Entertainment and IUGO Mobile Entertainment via Deca Games, Flying Wild Hog via Koch Media, Purple Lamp Studios via THQ Nordic, Silent Games via Amplifier Game Invest, as well as Quantic Lab directly. According to Klemens Kreuzer, the chief executive officer of THQ Nordic, the large number of acquisitions represented a portfolio diversification that contrasted the reliance of larger publishers like Electronic Arts on a few keystone titles.

Embracer Group announced three major acquisitions in February 2021: Gearbox Entertainment (including Gearbox Software) for $1.3 billion and Easybrain for $640 million as the seventh and eighth operative groups, as well as Aspyr (under Saber Interactive) for $450 million. These acquisitions were completed by April 2021. Embracer Group began issuing additional stock in March 2021 and raised another $890 million to further its acquisition strategies. That year, the company also bought 3D Realms, Demiurge Studios, Fractured Byte, Slipgate Ironworks and SmartPhone Labs through Saber Interactive, Appeal Studios, Kaiko and Massive Miniteam through THQ Nordic, Frame Break through Amplifier Game Invest, CrazyLabs through Deca Games, Ghost Ship Games and Easy Trigger Games through Coffee Stain, DigixArt through Koch Media, as well as Grimfrost directly. Asmodee, which principally distributed board games, became Embracer Group's ninth operative group for €2.75 billion in December 2021. In the same month, Embracer Group announced its tenth operative group with the acquisition of Dark Horse Media, the parent company of Dark Horse Comics and Dark Horse Entertainment, and Gearbox Entertainment purchased Perfect World Entertainment, including Cryptic Studios, for $125 million.

In May 2022, Square Enix and Embracer Group entered into an agreement for the latter to purchase Crystal Dynamics, Eidos-Montréal, and Square Enix Montreal, alongside intellectual properties like Tomb Raider, Deus Ex, Thief, and Legacy of Kain, for $300 million. The acquisition was closed by August 2022 and the assets transferred to CDE Entertainment. Square Enix Montréal was briefly rebranded as Onoma but closed in November 2022 in a cost reduction measure. Additionally, Embracer Group created the Embracer Group Archive video game preservation effort in May and established its eleventh operative group, Freemode, from C77 Entertainment, Game Outlet Europe, Grimfrost, Quantic Lab, and the newly purchased Bitwave Games, Clear River Games, Gioteck, and Tatsujin. The latter was subsequently expanded with the acquisitions of Limited Run Games, Singtrix, and Middle-earth Enterprises, which owns the media rights for The Lord of the Rings and The Hobbit.

=== Debt and restructuring (2022–present) ===
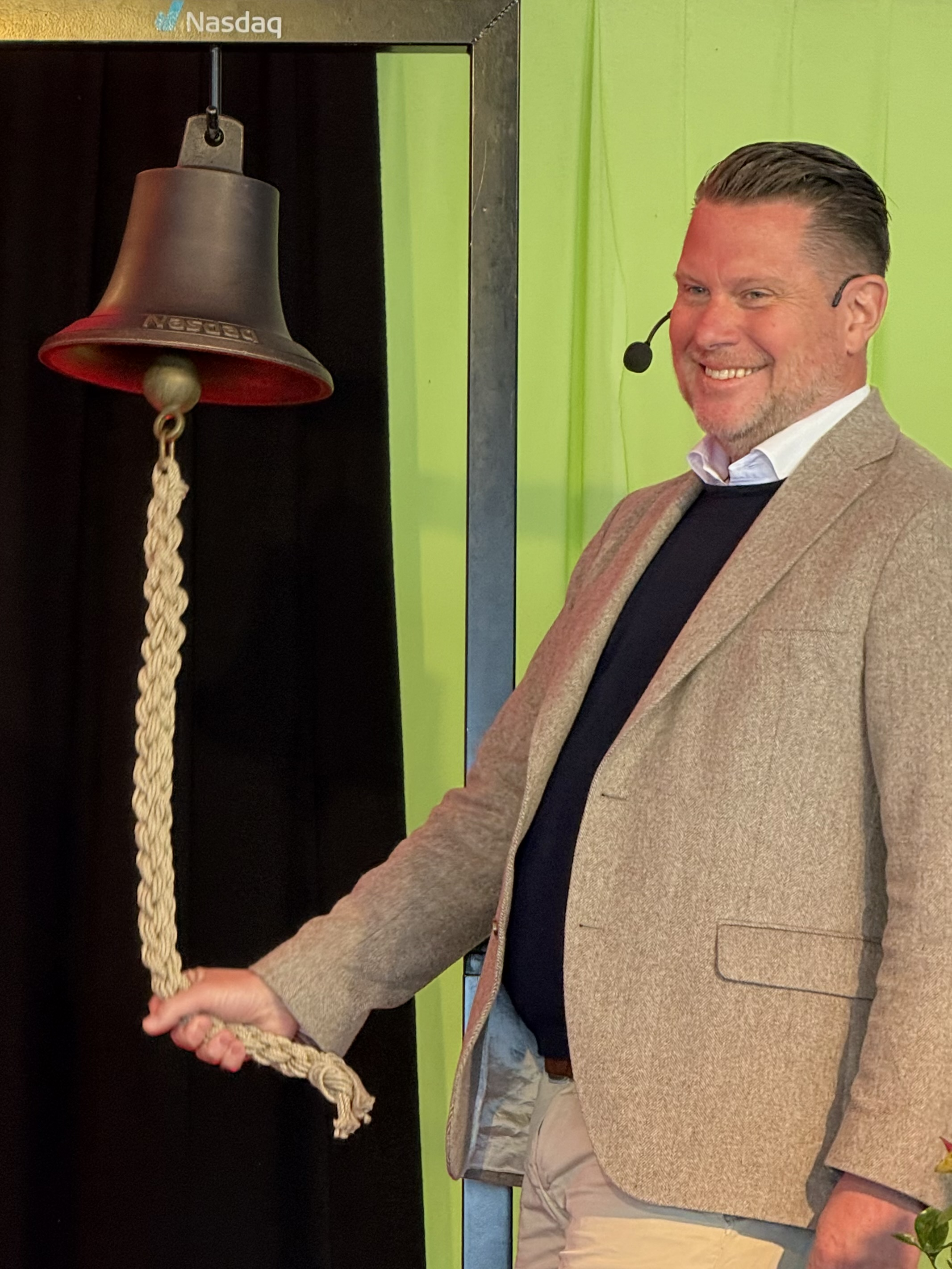
CEO Lars Wingefors rings the Nasdaq Stockholm bell in 2025, amid mass layoffs for the group.

Savvy Gaming Group (later Savvy Games Group), a company wholly owned by Saudi Arabia's Public Investment Fund, invested about $1 billion into Embracer Group in June 2022, gaining an 8.1% stake. Embracer Group transitioned from Nasdaq First North to Nasdaq Stockholm on 22 December 2022. In May 2023, the company announced that a $2 billion investment deal, which had been verbally agreed on in October 2022, had unexpectedly failed to materialise as the investing partner walked away from the deal after protracted negotiations. Shortly following the announcement, the company's shares fell by 40%. According to Axios, this partner was Savvy Games Group. Matt Karch, the CEO of Saber Interactive, said that the $2 billion deal had initially began for additional funds from investment towards new games in the Turok and Jurassic Park series, but more options were added in to cover development efforts across the Embracer group, and that the deal had become too large as a single monolithic approach for the Savvy Gaming Group, leading to the deal falling through.

Embracer Group consequently announced in June 2023 that it would immediately begin implementing a large-scale restructuring programme focused on cost reduction, comprising layoffs, studio closures and divestments, and project cancellations until March 2024. The company closed the Gearbox studios Volition in August and Free Radical Design in December. Other studios were subject to layoffs, including the THQ Nordic studio Campfire Cabal, which was effectively shut down according to Bruno-Christian Belibou.

By November 2023, Embracer Group had laid off 904 employees, roughly 5% of its workforce, and cancelled at least fifteen projects. As such, the company had reduced its debt from $2 billion to $1.5 billion, though warned that further layoffs and studio closures were likely. In February 2024, it was reported that Embracer Group was finalising the sales of Saber Interactive and Gearbox Entertainment. The sale of Saber Interactive was announced in March 2024. Beacon Interactive, a company owned by Saber Interactive's co-founder Matthew Karch, bought Saber Interactive for $247 million alongside its satellite studios and the subsidiaries 3D Realms, Bytex, Digic Pictures, Fractured Byte, Mad Head Games, New World Interactive, Nimble Giant Entertainment, Sandbox Strategies, Slipgate Ironworks, SmartPhone Labs, and Stuntworks. 34BigThings, 4A Games, Aspyr, Beamdog, Demiurge Studios, Shiver Entertainment, Snapshot Games, Tripwire Interactive, Tuxedo Labs, and Zen Studios remained with Embracer Group, to be integrated with other operative groups, although Beacon Interactive received an option to acquire 4A Games and Zen Studios in the future, but this option was cancelled on September 13, 2024. The divestiture also comprised 2,950 employees (21% of Embracer Group's workforce), including all staff in Russia. According to Jason Schreier of Bloomberg News, Beacon Interactive plans to exercise its option for a combined purchase price of $500 million.

In March 2024, Take-Two Interactive acquired Gearbox Entertainment, which was moved under the 2K label. After the sale closed, Gearbox Entertainment retained Gearbox Software, Gearbox Publishing, Gearbox Studio Montreal, Gearbox Studio Quebec, Gearbox Properties and the Borderlands, Homeworld, Risk of Rain, Brothers in Arms and Duke Nukem franchises, while Embracer Group retained Gearbox Publishing San Francisco (including Gearbox Shanghai), which was renamed Arc Games; Cryptic Studios; Lost Boys Interactive; and Captured Dimensions alongside several titles. Retained companies were integrated into other parts of Embracer Group.

With the sale of Gearbox, Embracer CEO Lars Wingefors stated that the company restructuring was complete, and had no short-term plans to restart mergers or acquisitions, instead focusing on "simply making better products and games" to improve cash flow. From June 2023 to May 2024, the restructuring had led to the loss of 4532 employees, the closure of 44 studios, and cancellation of 80 in-development projects, including a new Deus Ex, TimeSplitters and Red Faction games. Despite these steps, the company still faced $1.5 billion in debt.

In April 2024, Embracer Group announced that it would split up into three separate publicly traded companies on the Swedish stock market within the next two years. "Fellowship Entertainment" (under the working name "Middle-earth Enterprises & Friends") will be used for the commercial rights to J.R.R. Tolkien's work The Hobbit and The Lord of the Rings, as well as intellectual properties such as Tomb Raider, Darksiders, Dead Island, Kingdom Come: Deliverance, Metro, and Remnant. Studios joining the new company will include 4A Games, Crystal Dynamics, Dambuster Studios, Dark Horse Media, Eidos-Montréal, Fishlabs, Flying Wild Hog, Gunfire Games, Middle-earth Enterprises, RedOctane Games and Warhorse Studios. Embracer Group will remain as a company but would operate as a highly decentralized organization with distinct strategies across its business segments, and oversee IPs including Destroy All Humans!, Desperados, Gothic, Killing Floor, Kingdom of Amalur, MX vs. ATV, Reanimal, Ride, Screamer, Titan Quest, and Wreckfest, as well as licenses such as Hot Wheels Unleashed and SpongeBob SquarePants. Companies remaining with Embracer include Aspyr, Beamdog, CrazyLabs, Deca Games, Demiurge Studios, DPI Merchandising, Limited Run Games, Milestone, Plaion Partners, Plaion Pictures, THQ Nordic (including 35 studios and subsidiaries), Tripwire Interactive and Vertigo Games. The Asmodee Group will be the publisher of board and card games from Asmodee and its studios, which came into effect on 7 February 2025. "Coffee Stain Group" (under the working name "Coffee Stain & Friends") will focused on community driven experiences, and will include companies under the Coffee Stain group, Ghost Ship and Tuxedo Labs as well as certain studios from Amplifier Game Invest, all based in Scandinavia, which came into effect on 11 December 2025. Wingefors will own all three companies under the new holding company Embracer AB and remain as the group CEO once the splits are complete.

In May 2024, Nintendo announced their acquisition of Shiver Entertainment from Embracer, subject to closing conditions. In June 2024, Embracer closed Alone in the Dark (2024) developer Pieces Interactive following the game's disappointing performance. In July, it was reported that Piranha Bytes was quietly shuttered at the end of June.

In November 2024, Embracer Group said that they had reduced their number of employees from 15,701 to 10,450. That same month, they announced that they would divest Easybrain to Miniclip for a consideration of $1.2 billion, with the transaction close on January 22, 2025. By the end of 2024, Embracer had reduced their number of employees to 7,873.

In May 2025, Embracer Group announced that Amplifier Game Invest would be dissolved, "integrating successful and high-potential studios, including Tarsier Studios, into other operative groups within Embracer to support their continued growth, while underperforming games and studios with negative cash flow have been closed or divested".

In June 2025, Embracer Group announced that CEO Lars Wingefors would resign from its position and would be replaced by Phil Rogers, formerly of Eidos Interactive and Square Enix, effective in August 2025. Rogers also serves as the CEO of both Plaion and Crystal Dynamics - Eidos at the time of the transition, and previously held the position as deputy CEO. Wingefors kept his board member position and later transitioned as the group's chairman. By the end of March 2026, Embracer had reduced their number of employees to 6,090.

On May 20, 2026, Embracer Group announced that it would spin-off Fellowship Entertainment into a separate company, set to be completed sometime during 2027. Following this, Embracer Group would rebrand itself to Embracer.

== Subsidiaries ==
As of August 2026, Embracer Group employs nearly 5,000 employees with 2,869 being in the Embracer segment across 30 studios and with 2,071 in the Fellowship Entertainment segment across 9 studios all in 30 countries.

- Embracer
  - Aspyr
    - Beamdog
  - Deca Games
    - A Thinking Ape Entertainment
    - CrazyLabs
      - Firescore Interactive
  - Demiurge Studios
  - DestinyBit
  - Framebunker (34% stake)
  - Freemode
    - Bitwave Games
    - Clear River Games
    - Game Outlet Europe
    - Gioteck
    - Grimfrost
    - RedOctane
    - Limited Run Games
    - Singtrix
    - Tatsujin
  - Plaion
    - Development Plus
    - Milestone
    - Plaion Partners
    - Plaion Pictures
      - Sola Media
    - Vertigo Games
      - Vertigo Arcade
      - Vertigo Publishing
        - Vertigo Publishing Amsterdam
      - Vertigo Studios
  - THQ Nordic
    - Alkimia Interactive
    - Ashborne Games
    - Bugbear Entertainment
    - Campfire Cabal
    - DigixArt
    - Experiment 101
    - Gate21
    - Grimlore Games
    - Kaiko
    - Metricminds
    - Nine Rocks Games
    - Purple Lamp
    - Snapshot Games
    - Tarsier Studios
    - THQ Nordic Mobile
      - Massive Miniteam
      - HandyGames Studios
    - Voxler
    - Zen Studios
  - Tripwire Interactive
- Fellowship Entertainment
  - 4A Games
  - Crystal Dynamics
    - Crystal Northwest
    - Crystal Southwest
  - Dark Horse Media
    - Dark Horse Comics
    - Dark Horse Entertainment
    - Things from Another World
  - Deep Silver
    - Fishlabs
    - Dambuster Studios
  - Eidos-Montréal
  - Flying Wild Hog
  - Gunfire Games
    - Gunfire Games Europe
  - Middle-earth Enterprises
  - RedOctane Games
  - Warhorse Studios

=== Divested subsidiaries ===
- Coffee Stain (acquired in November 2018, spun off in December 2025)
  - A Creative Endeavor
  - Box Dragon
  - Coffee Stain Studios
    - Coffee Stain Gothenburg
    - Coffee Stain Malmö
    - Coffee Stain North
  - Coffee Stain Publishing
  - Easy Trigger Games
  - Frame Break
  - Ghost Ship Games
    - Ghost Ship Publishing
  - Invisible Walls
  - Iron Gate Studios (30%)
  - Kavalri Games
  - Lavapotion
  - Tuxedo Labs
  - Vaulted Sky Games (30%)
- Former Amplifier Game Invest Studios:
  - C77 Entertainment (founded January 2020, moved to Freemode in August 2022, sold to Krafton in January 2024)
  - Fall Damage (acquired in 2019, sold to Fragbite Group in October 2023)
  - Goose Byte (founded December 2021, divested in August 2023)
  - Misc Games (53% stake, divested in October 2025)
  - Neon Giant (28% stake, fully acquired April 2018, sold to Krafton in November 2022)
  - Rare Earth (acquired August 2020, divested in April 2024)
  - River End Games (founded January 2020, sold to Nordcurrent in November 2023)
  - Silent Games (acquired November 2020, divested in July 2023)
  - Studio Hermitage (founded January 2023, divested in April 2025)
  - Vermila Studios (acquired August 2020, divested in 2023)
  - Zapper Games (founded December 2021, divested in March 2025)
- Saber Interactive (acquired in February 2020, sold to Beacon Interactive in March 2024)
  - Saber Armenia
  - Saber Belarus
  - Saber London
  - Saber Madrid
  - Saber Porto
  - Saber St. Petersburg
  - Saber Sweden
  - 3D Realms
  - Bytex
  - Digic Pictures
  - Fractured Byte
  - Mad Head Games
  - New World Interactive
  - Nimble Giant Entertainment
  - Sandbox Strategies
  - SmartPhone Labs
  - Slipgate Ironworks
  - Stuntworks
- Gearbox Entertainment (acquired in 2021, sold to Take-Two Interactive in June 2024)
  - Gearbox Software
  - Gearbox Studio Montréal
  - Gearbox Studio Québec
  - Gearbox Studios
  - Gearbox Properties
- Asmodee (acquired in December 2021, spun off in February 2025)
  - Access+
  - Aconyte
  - Atomic Mass Games
  - Bezzerwizzer Studio
  - Catan Studio
  - Days of Wonder
  - Edge Entertainment
  - Exploding Kittens
  - Fantasy Flight Games
  - Gamegenic
  - Libellud
  - Lookout Games
  - Mixlore
  - Plan B Games
  - Plaid Hat Games
  - Rebel Studio
  - Repos Production
  - Space Cow
  - Space Cowboys
  - The Green Board Game Co.
  - Twin Sails Interactive
  - Unexpected Games
  - VR Group
  - Z-Man Games
  - Zygomatic Games
- Former THQ Nordic Studios:
  - Foxglove Studios (founded in 2016, divested in 2019)
  - Rainbow Studios (reestablished January 2013, divested in March 2024)
  - Black Forest Games (acquired in august 2017, divested in November 2026)
- Former Plaion Studios:
  - Anime Limited (acquired in October 2022, sold to Toho in December 2025)
- Other Divested Studios:
  - Shiver Entertainment (acquired by Saber Interactive in December 2021, retained when Saber was sold, then sold to Nintendo in May 2024)
  - Easybrain (acquired in February 2021, sold to Miniclip in November 2024)
  - SpringboardVR (acquired in February 2021, sold to SynthesisVR in February 2025)
  - Arc Games (acquired in December 2021, sold to management in November 2025)
  - Cryptic Studios (acquired in December 2021, sold to management in November 2025)
  - Lost Boys Interactive (acquired in June 2022, sold to management in December 2025)
  - 34BigThings (acquired in November 2020, sold to management in April 2026)

=== Closed subsidiaries ===
- Amplifier Game Invest (announced May 2025)
  - Green Tile Digital (acquired December 2021, closed in September 2025)
  - Infinite Mana Games (founded August 2022, closed in February 2025)
  - Palindrome Interactive (acquired August 2020, closed in April 2025)
  - Plucky Bytes (founded November 2020, closed in 2023)
- Former CDE Studios:
  - Square Enix Montréal (acquired August 2022, closed in November 2022)
  - Eidos-Sherbrooke (acquired August 2022, closed in June 2024)
- Former THQ Nordic Studios:
  - Pieces Interactive (acquired by THQ Nordic in 2017, closed in June 2024)
  - Piranha Bytes (acquired by THQ Nordic in 2019, closed in June 2024)
  - Pow Wow Entertainment (acquired by THQ Nordic in August 2020, closed in June 2024)
  - Mirage Game Studios (founded by THQ Nordic in January 2017, closed in April 2025)
- Former Deep Silver studios:
  - Volition (acquired by Deep Silver in January 2013, closed in August 2023)
  - Free Radical Design (reestablished by Deep Silver in May 2021, closed in December 2023)
- Former DECA Games studios:
  - IUGO Mobile Entertainment (acquired by Deca Games in November 2020, closed in March 2025)
- Former Asmodee studios:
  - Pearl Games (acquired by Asmodee in January 2015, closed in June 2024)
- Former Freemode studios:
  - Captured Dimensions (acquired in January 2023, closed in April 2026)

=== Merged subsidiaries ===
- Splatter Connect (merged into Plaion)
- Gaya Entertainment (merged into Plaion)
- KSM Film (merged into Plaion Pictures)
- Spotfilm Networx (merged into Plaion Pictures)
- 18Point2 (merged into Plaion)
- Jufeng Studio (merged into Deca Games)
