= List of roguelike deck-building games =

This is a list of roguelike deck-building games considered to be notable.

== Legend ==
Video game platforms
WIN	Windows, all versions Windows 95 and up	LIN	Linux, SteamOS	OSX	macOS
DROID	Android	iOS	iOS, iPhone, iPod, iPadOS, iPad, visionOS, Apple Vision Pro	NS	Nintendo Switch
NS2	Nintendo Switch 2	PS4	PlayStation 4	PS5	PlayStation 5
XBO	Xbox One	XBX/S	Xbox Series X/S		

== List ==
Title	Year	Developer	Platform	ref
Dream Quest	2014	Peter Whalen	WIN, iOS	
Hand of Fate	2015	Defiant Development	WIN, LIN, OSX	
Hand of Fate 2	2017	Defiant Developments	WIN, LIN, OSX	
Slay the Spire	2019	MegaCrit	WIN, LIN, OSX, DROID, iOS, NS, PS4, XBO	
Nowhere Prophet	2019	Sharkbomb Studios	WIN, LIN, OSX, NS, PS4, XBO	
The Legend of Bum-bo	2019	Edmund McMillen, James Interactive	WIN, iOS, NS, PS5, XBX/S	
Dicey Dungeons	2019	Terry Cavanagh	WIN, LIN, OSX	
Monster Train	2020	Shiny Shoe	WIN, XBO	
One Step From Eden	2020	Thomas Moon Kang	WIN, LIN, Mac OS, NS, PS4, XBO	
Signs of the Sojourner	2020	Echodog Games	WIN, OSX	
Fights in Tight Spaces	2021	Ground Shatter	WIN, XBO	
Griftlands	2021	Klei	WIN, LIN, OSX, PS4	
Inscryption	2021	Daniel Mullins Games	WIN, LIN, OSX, NS, PS4, PS5	
Tainted Grail: Conquest	2021	Questline	WIN, LIN	
Trials of Fire	2021	Whatboy Games	WIN	
Alina of the Arena	2022	PINIX	WIN, NS	
Luck Be a Landlord	2023	TrampolineTales	WIN, LIN, OSX, DROID, iOS	
Wildfrost	2023	Deadpan Games & Gaziter	WIN, DROID, NS	
Backpack Hero	2023	Jaspel	WIN, LIN, OSX	
Cobalt Core	2023	Rocket Rat Games	WIN	
Balatro	2024	LocalThunk	WIN	
Yohane the Parhelion: Numazu in the Mirage	2024	BeXide	WIN, NS, PS4, PS5	
Gakuen Idolmaster	2024	QualiArts	DROID, iOS	
Shogun Showdown	2024	Roboatino	WIN, LIN, OSX, NS, PS4, PS5, XBO, XBX/S	
Card-en-Ciel	2024	Inti Creates	WIN, NS, NS2, PS4, PS5, XBO, XBX/S	
Drop Duchy	2025	Sleepy Mill Studio	WIN, NS, PS5, XBX/S	
Spellrogue	2025	Ghost Ship Games	WIN	
As We Descend	TBA	Box Dragon	WIN	
Slay the Spire II	2026	Mega Crit	WIN, LIN, OSX	

== See also ==
- List of roguelikes
