= Balatro =

2024 video game

- Developer: LocalThunk
- Publisher: Playstack
- Composer: Luis Clemente (LouisF)
- Engine: Löve
- Platforms: Android; iOS; macOS; Nintendo Switch; Nintendo Switch 2; PlayStation 4; PlayStation 5; Windows; Xbox One; Xbox Series X/S
- Release: WW: February 20, 2024; macOS: WW: March 1, 2024; Android, iOS: WW: September 26, 2024; Nintendo Switch 2: WW: February 25, 2026
- Genre: Roguelike deck-building
- Mode: Single-player

Balatro (Note: /ˈbɑːlɑːtroʊ/ BAH-lah-troh or /ˈbælətroʊ/ BAL-ə-troh; see § Etymology for more information.) is a 2024 poker-themed roguelike deck-building game developed by solo developer LocalThunk and published by Playstack. It was released for Nintendo Switch, PlayStation 4, PlayStation 5, Windows, Xbox One, and Xbox Series X/S on February 20, 2024, with a port to macOS on March 1. Ports for Android and iOS were released on September 26, 2024. A dedicated Nintendo Switch 2 version was released on February 25, 2026. In the game, the player must score points by playing poker hands from a starting 52-card deck, with a limited number of hands and discards each round.

Inspired by the card game big two and the roguelike video game Luck Be a Landlord, LocalThunk developed Balatro over two and a half years. Initially, LocalThunk treated it as a side project to put on a résumé, not anticipating its success.

Balatro has received universal acclaim from game critics and sold more than 5 million copies by January 2025. Along with several other awards and nominations, it was named Game of the Year at the 25th Game Developers Choice Awards and nominated for the top prize at The Game Awards 2024, the 28th Annual D.I.C.E. Awards, and the 21st British Academy Games Awards.

== Gameplay ==
=== Playthrough ===
Balatro is a singleplayer roguelike deck-building game based on the rules of poker. The player chooses a deck, each with unique effects and cards, before each playthrough or "run". A run is divided into antes, each with three blinds of increasing difficulty. During a "round" against a blind, the player uses their hands and discards to play poker hands and attempt to score the required number of chips (points). To make it easier to defeat blinds, the player may purchase various cards that change the rules or provide an advantage. These are bought in a shop between rounds with an in-game currency.

==== Blinds ====
Blinds are the obstacles the player must pass in Balatro. Blinds have three major types: Small Blind, Big Blind, and Boss Blind. Small and Big Blinds can either be skipped or played. When skipping a blind, the player forgoes the cash rewards of defeating the blind and an opportunity to use the shop but is rewarded with a tag, granting special rewards. Most tags give some benefit upon entering the next shop, such as free cards or booster packs, but some effects are instant or apply when other criteria are met. Each type of Boss Blind has a special ability, such as disabling certain cards or limiting the player's hands or discards. Ante 8—as well as all antes that are a multiple of 8—have a "Showdown Blind" in place of a Boss Blind, which selects from one of five special types which do not appear in any other circumstance.

==== Antes and rounds ====
Each ante consists of three rounds, one against a Small Blind, one against a Big Blind, and the final round against a Boss Blind, which allows the player to progress to the next ante. In each round, the player has a limited number of hands within which they must beat a target score, as well as a limited number of discards with which they may replace up to five cards in their hand with different ones. The game ends if the player runs out of hands or cards to play before reaching the target score.

During a round, the player draws playing cards from their deck, initially starting with a standard 52-card deck, while cards can be added, modified, and destroyed throughout the run. The player then selects up to five cards, with the objective of forming poker hands to score points. The hand's base value is calculated and turned into "Chips", which are then multiplied by "Mult", which increases depending on cards, hands, and jokers held by the player. Joker cards affect the game in various ways, such as offering additional Chips or Mult when conditions are met or changing how certain poker hands can be played.

A round of Balatro against a Big Blind with a Popcorn joker card

Upon defeating a Blind, the player is awarded with in-game cash ($), and presented with a shop. Here, the player may use their cash to purchase items, such as booster packs, Jokers, and a voucher which grants an immediate permanent upgrade (ex. modifying shop contents, granting an additional hand or discard). It is possible to play until ante 39 in endless mode at which point the amount of required chips, stored under double-precision floating-point format, overflows to infinity, which get stored as NaN under such number format. (Represented in the game as either "nan" or "naneinf", NaN times ten to the power of infinity, written in E notation) Because all numbers (including NaN) will always be compared as unordered (Note: Unordered is a relation separate from less than, equal to, or greater. See NaN#Comparison with NaN for more info.) against NaN, the player score cannot be evaluated as equal to or greater than NaN, causing further progression to be impossible. (Note: In video game jargon, this is known as a kill screen.)

==== End of a run ====
The player wins a run by completing ante 8. The only way to do this is by defeating the first Showdown Blind. However, the player can still continue playing in endless mode even after beating ante 8. Running out of hands or cards without hitting the score required during a round ends the run. If the player has not completed ante 8 when the game ends, the player has lost. In endless mode, these conditions still cause the game to end, though the player still won by completing ante 8.

=== Cards ===
The three additional non-standard poker hands available when the deck is modified

Jokers, special cards which the player holds separately from their deck, are the primary means by which players can alter their scoring in the game, among other effects. The game was released with 150 Joker cards. Many Jokers provide Chips or Mult bonuses based on certain conditions, and some provide Mult multipliers, multiplying the player's Mult. Jokers have a wide range of abilities including rewarding money, creating or duplicating cards, or modifying the player's amount of hands and discards. Jokers often require certain conditions to be met for their abilities to be triggered, or used to their full potential. Jokers can be found with or upgraded to have variants like Foil, Holographic, Polychrome, which affect the player's Chips or Mult, as well as the Negative modifier which grants an additional slot for Joker storage, effectively making the Joker occupy no space. Part of the strategy of Balatro is filling one's limited Joker slots with Jokers that have interactions with each other and other cards to greatly increase scoring opportunities.

==== Consumables ====
Players can modify their deck of playing cards through various means, which can be used to improve the odds of drawing specific hands, or improve the score output of certain cards. Additional playing cards can be obtained through booster packs at the shop. Existing cards can also be modified, destroyed or copied using Tarot cards and Spectral cards. Utilizing these, it is therefore possible to play non-traditional poker hands such as Five of a Kind, Flush House (full house of all the same suit), and Flush Five (five of the same suit and rank).

Major Arcana from the cartomantic Tarot deck provide various one-time effects, such as changing cards to different playing card suits, enhancing them to provide bonuses when played, or destroying cards. Spectral cards behave similarly, though provide stronger effects, such as creating copies of a card, applying upgrade variants to Jokers and playing cards, or modifying the player's cash in exchange for a negative or positive effect. Planet cards raise the level of a poker hand, increasing their base Chips and Mult values when played. Each planet card applies to a different hand depending on its type, and upgrades that hand for the duration of the run.

==== Decks ====
The deck of playing cards that the player chooses at the beginning of a run also has its own effects; the player starts out with a "starter" series of decks, and completes runs to unlock new ones. Completing runs also unlocks "stakes" for the deck used, which add more difficult conditions to the run. New special cards and vouchers can be unlocked for future runs by meeting certain conditions.

=== Modding ===
Balatro has significant support for modification primarily through the third-party mod loader Steamodded. Many mods exist for Balatro; one famous example of this is the Cryptid mod, which adds over 120 Jokers and is designed to be intentionally unbalanced. Another popular mod for Balatro is the Multiplayer mod, which allows players to face off against another player during a Nemesis Blind, in which whoever scores the highest is able to take a life from their opponent. Players lose when they have no more lives.

== Development ==
Balatro was developed by LocalThunk, an anonymous solo developer based in Saskatchewan, Canada. In an interview, he said that he mostly plays online competitive games, and that he ponders roguelike games more than actually playing them. Despite the game's theme, LocalThunk said he does not play poker, nor does he want the game to be used for gambling by casinos and players.

Development began in 2021, two-and-a-half years before release, initially intended to be one of several small games that were shared with friends. The initial idea was an online version of the Cantonese card game big two, which has players playing a number of cards to create poker-like hands. After seeing the number of roguelike deckbuilders on Steam, and watching a Twitch stream of Northernlion playing Luck Be a Landlord, a slot machine-themed roguelike, he was inspired to turn his big two clone into a singleplayer roguelike deckbuilder without online play. According to LocalThunk, he avoided playing deckbuilders to avoid taking ideas from these games, and had only played Slay the Spire near the end of development to understand how it implemented its control scheme. He at one point considered the name Joker Poker for the game, before settling on Balatro, from the Ancient Roman term for a professional jester or buffoon.

On using the standard 52 playing card deck as a base LocalThunk said, "it's this shared cultural game design tool that has evolved over hundreds of years", and on the game's success was quoted as being partly "because you're borrowing from this really tried-and-true tool."

The soundtrack for Balatro was written and produced by LouisF, a freelance Fiverr artist. The composer was contacted in March 2023, and the music was released the same month. In his published timeline of the game's production, LocalThunk noted that it was the only money that he planned to spend during the development of Balatro.

"I got a DM on Twitter from a scout at Playstack, my eventual publisher... I was super excited, but this also complicated things. This was a very tumultuous time in the history of the game because I was in limbo between 'Nothing will come of this game and I want to move on with my life' and 'What if I could do this as a job?'"

— LocalThunk on being discovered by Playstack.

A very early version of the game was circulated among his friends, who gave positive reviews after months of playing. About a year prior to release, LocalThunk quit his day job to focus on finishing Balatro "to put on a résumé". The game was uploaded to Steam and was found by Playstack Head of Discovery Patrick Johnson who had the task of looking at all new releases on Steam. Johnson thought the game looked "interesting" and "cool-looking" and so he contacted LocalThunk on Twitter. LocalThunk signed a publishing contract with PlayStack, and with their help developed a launch campaign around beta releases and promotion via major video game streamers. LocalThunk used player feedback from the betas for additional features in the final version of the game, including the addition of boss battles.

Balatro was programmed in Lua with the Löve game framework. LocalThunk's pseudonym derives from the keyword "local" used to define variables and "Thunk", a common variable name in his partner's projects.

=== Etymology ===
The game is named after the Latin word for "professional jester or buffoon". Developer LocalThunk said that its pronunciation can be "whatever makes people happy," though he personally pronounces it /ˈbælətroʊ/ BAL-ə-troh, as does the narrator in the game's launch trailer. Many players and YouTubers pronounce the title /bəˈlɑːtroʊ/ bə-LAH-troh with stress on the second syllable.

== Release ==
In 2023, prior to release, the game became available as a demo. It was removed by LocalThunk on January 1, 2024, and was brought back on January 25, with the new version containing 40 new Jokers, new bosses, and booster packs. The new version was uploaded alongside a new trailer and a release date for the full version of the game, February 20, 2024. In April 2024, the game was made easier with an experimental balance patch, 1.0.1c.

localthunk
(@LocalThunk)
tweeted:

Since PEGI gave us an 18+ rating for having evil playing cards maybe I should add microtransactions/loot boxes/real gambling to lower that rating to 3+ like EA sports FC

December 15, 2024

Shortly after the game's release, Balatro's PEGI rating was changed from 3+ to 18+ for "prominent gambling imagery" due to PEGI's strict rules on portraying gambling, causing the game to be temporarily removed from sale in certain territories. Publisher Playstack stated that they had discussed the game's content with PEGI prior to release (causing its initial 18+ rating to be lowered to 3+) and that, while being based on poker, the game does not portray any form of gambling, and intended to appeal the re-rating. LocalThunk criticised the rating change posting on X "Since PEGI gave us an 18+ rating for having evil playing cards maybe I should add microtransactions/loot boxes/real gambling to lower that rating to 3+ like EA Sports FC". The rating reprisal was successfully appealed in February 2025, and along with Luck be a Landlord, Balatro was reclassified with a 12+ rating, recognizing that the fantasy elements of the game distinguished it from gambling. PEGI has stated they will introduce more granular classification rules for future games involving gambling-like elements. After YouTube changed its policies in March 2025, many Balatro videos were marked as 18+ for "depictions or promotions of online casino sites or apps," blocking these videos from child YouTube accounts.

LocalThunk and Playstack confirmed plans for ports to Android and iOS mobile devices in March 2024. The ports released on September 26, 2024, including a Balatro+ version for Apple Arcade. The ports grossed $1 million in the first week and $4.4 million in 2 months. Various pieces of official merchandise have also been released; A physical deck of playing cards using Balatro's pixel art graphics and a 2026 calendar (featuring photographs of Ben Starr cosplaying various jokers) were released by Fangamer, various t-shirts with mascot Jimbo and various other cards are sold by Playstack., numerous plushes, pins, and keychains were released by Makeship, and three figurines were released by Youtooz.

Four free "Friends of Jimbo" updates, adding interchangeable cosmetic packs (changing the appearance of the face cards) featuring crossovers with other video games, were released on August 27, October 24, December 12, 2024, and February 24, 2025, respectively. The first update features crossovers with The Witcher 3, Vampire Survivors, Dave the Diver and Among Us, the second update features crossovers with Cyberpunk 2077, The Binding of Isaac, Slay the Spire and Stardew Valley, the third update features crossovers with Divinity: Original Sin II, Shovel Knight, Potion Craft, Enter the Gungeon, Cult of the Lamb, Don't Starve, 1000xResist and Warframe, and the fourth update features crossovers with Critical Role, Bugsnax, Sid Meier's Civilization VII, Rust, Assassin's Creed, Slay the Princess, Dead by Daylight and Fallout. Several of these games include references to Balatro within them as well.

LocalThunk had planned to release a major update to Balatro during 2025, but by September 2025, opted to delay it indefinitely, stating his desire to continue to keep the game's development as his hobby and avoid crunch. In a February 2026 post commemorating Balatro's second anniversary, he confirmed the update is still being worked on.

=== Appearances in other games ===
Balatro-themed content has been added to numerous other games through official collaborations, including:

- Dungeons & Degenerate Gamblers · Features Jimbo the Joker as a card.
- Dave the Diver · A free update released on October 24, 2024, added a quest where several characters could challenge the player with a condensed version of Balatro, dubbed “Jimbo's Game”.
- Cyberpunk 2077 · A major update released on December 10, 2024, adding a quest where a character named Jim B. tasks the player with removing graffiti around the city featuring designs of numerous jokers. Upon completion the player is rewarded a white T-shirt with a joker design not seen in Balatro.
- Little Kitty, Big City · A free update released on February 25, 2025, adding Jimbo's jester cap as a wearable hat.
- Monster Train 2 · Upon the game’s release on May 21, 2025, players can randomly encounter Jimbo and gain access to six different joker power-ups.
- Assassins Creed Shadows · A patch released on May 27, 2025, includes an unlockable Balatro joker-themed “Winning Hand” trinket and amulet.
- Dying Light 2 · A free update on June 26, 2025, added quests to unlock several Balatro-themed items for free, including a Jimbo costume, ceremonial dagger knife, and a charm that would grant various abilities based on several jokers.
- Rusty's Retirement · A Balatro-themed update released on August 7, 2025, added several Balatro-themed structures and several jokers that can inhabit your farm.
- Vampire Survivors · Includes a Balatro themed level along with characters and weapons based on the game in a free Ante Chamber DLC pack released on October 28, 2025.
- Dead by Daylight · A head cosmetic for the killer The Unknown based on the Madness joker was available for free between February 20 and March 20, 2026.
- Scriptorium: Master of Manuscripts · A free update in June 2026 included Jimbo as a piece of artwork as well as him appearing in the game's story asking for Balatro inspired commissions.
- Don't Starve Together· A free update released on April 10, 2025 adding Balatro-themed slot machine
- Kingdom Come: Deliverance II· A free update released on June 25, 2026 added a character named Jimbo who challenges the protagonist to several dice games in order to spread awareness of his new card game.

== Reception ==
Reception

Aggregate scores
Aggregator	Score
Metacritic	PC: 90/100; XBXS: 95/100; PS5: 90/100; NS: 90/100
OpenCritic	100% recommend

Review scores
Publication	Score
Eurogamer	4/5
Game Informer	9.5/10
GameSpot	9/10
Hardcore Gamer	5/5
IGN	9/10
Nintendo Life	10/10
Nintendo World Report	9/10
PC Gamer (US)	91%
Push Square	9/10
Shacknews	9/10

Balatro has received "universal acclaim" according to review aggregator website Metacritic. OpenCritic, another aggregator, said that 100% of critics recommend the game.

The game's playability has received praise from critics. Simon Cardy from IGN described it as "ludicrously fun" and "remarkably approachable," while Jordan Helm from Hardcore Gamer called it "addictive" and "expertly-crafted". Writing for The Guardian, Keza MacDonald stated that "Balatro might be the best card game you will ever come across".

In addition, the game's roguelike elements have received positive reviews. Abbie Stone from PC Gamer described gameplay as "strategizing your way to success," and Alessandro Barbosa from GameSpot called each run "surprisingly fresh." Chris Allnutt writing in Financial Times praised the "wonderfully retro VCR-style visuals, lo-fi music and irreverent sound effects."

Charlie Brooker, the creator of Black Mirror, called it "possibly the most addictive thing ever created" and that once it was released for mobile devices, "humankind's activity is going to drop about 25%"; Balatro was subsequently briefly shown in the "Hotel Reverie" episode of Black Mirror's seventh season, released in April 2025. Film director James Gunn called Balatro a "great game", and spent much of the downtime during production of Superman playing the game.

With the success of Balatro, LocalThunk kept to a low profile, not wanting much attention on his real-world identity and avoiding the stress that would come with it. He has also used the attention drawn to Balatro to highlight other indie titles released near the same time, including naming Animal Well, Dungeons & Degenerate Gamblers, Arco, Nova Drift, Ballionaire, and Mouthwashing for his "Golden Thunk Awards". While LocalThunk and his partner had been present at the Game Awards, he told no one else who they were, and opted to allow representatives from PlayStack to accept the awards Balatro won on his behalf. A similar arrangement was made for the Game Developers Choice Awards, with PlayStack representatives accepting the awards for Balatro while LocalThunk remained anonymous at the event. For the 21st British Academy Games Awards, LocalThunk was able to send actor Ben Starr, previously having played Jimbo the joker for live-action videos for the game, to accept his award.

Following its popularity, the game has inspired significant activity from the player community, including memes, the integration of other games within it, and an unofficial port to the Apple Watch developed in January 2025, called Wee Balatro, which is awaiting the author's approval.

=== Sales ===
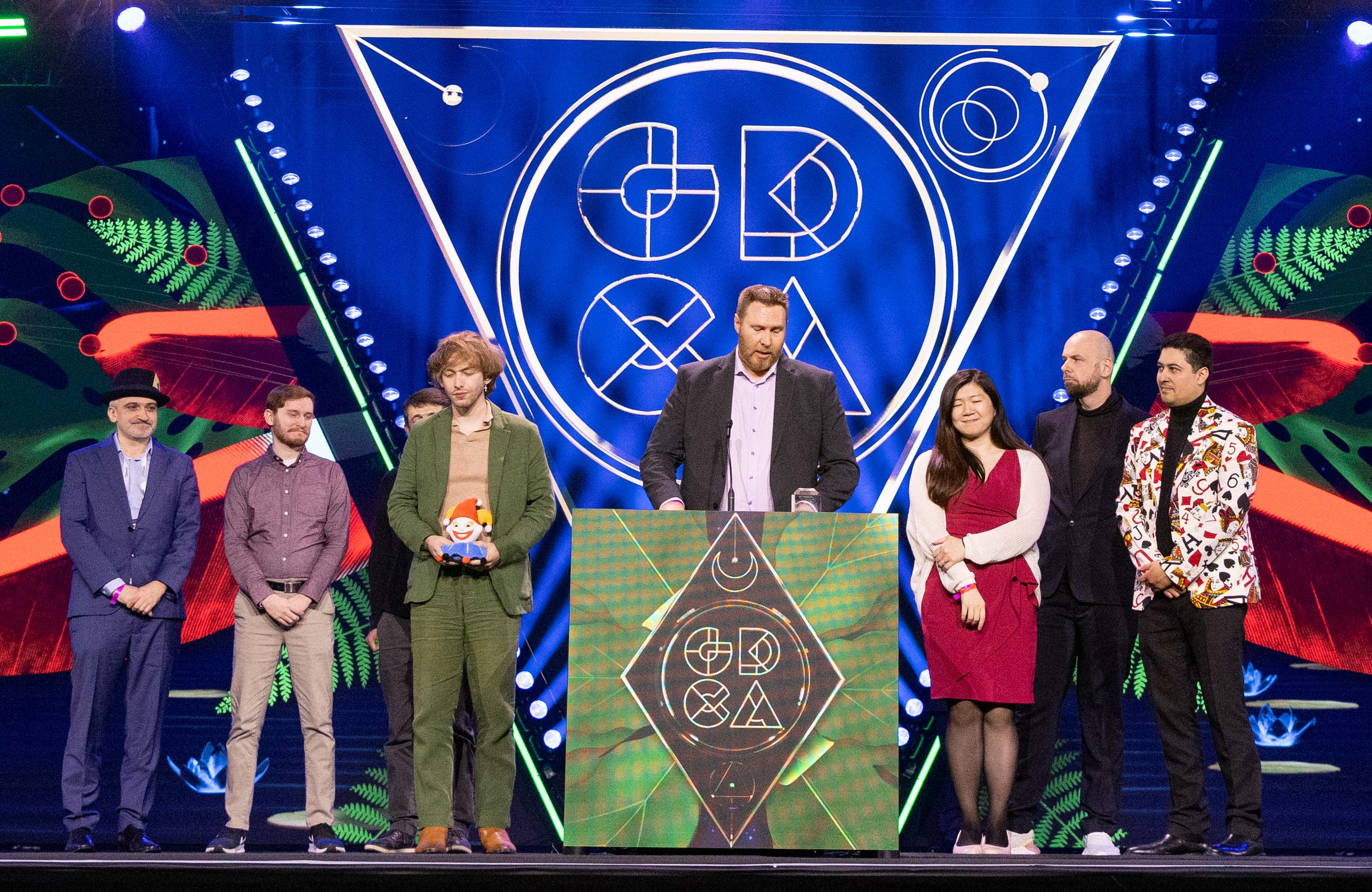
The Playstack team accepting the Game of the Year Award at the 25th Game Developers Choice Awards

Within eight hours of release, the game had made over US$1 million in gross revenue according to publisher Playstack. Over one million copies were sold within the first month. By January 2025, the game had surpassed 5 million copies, with around half of those coming after the mobile releases in September 2024, and does not account for those who downloaded the game via their Apple Arcade subscriptions.

=== Accolades ===
Balatro received nominations for multiple accolades. In 2024 it won Golden Joystick Awards' "Best Indie Game" and "Breakthrough" awards. At The Game Awards 2024, it won "Best Independent Game", "Best Debut Indie Game", and "Best Mobile Game"; it was also nominated for "Game of the Year", the first time a solo game project was nominated for the top honor. It also received awards from the Academy of Interactive Arts & Sciences for "Outstanding Achievement for an Independent Game", "Strategy/Simulation Game of the Year", and "Mobile Game of the Year" at the 28th Annual D.I.C.E. Awards.

Year	Ceremony	Category	Result	Ref.
2024	Golden Joystick Awards	Ultimate Game of the Year	Nominated	
2024	Golden Joystick Awards	Best Indie Game	Won	
2024	Golden Joystick Awards	Best Audio Design	Nominated	
2024	Golden Joystick Awards	PC Game of the Year	Nominated	
2024	Golden Joystick Awards	Breakthrough (Critic's Choice)	Won	
2024	The Game Awards 2024	Game of the Year	Nominated	
2024	The Game Awards 2024	Best Game Direction	Nominated	
2024	The Game Awards 2024	Best Independent Game	Won	
2024	The Game Awards 2024	Best Debut Indie Game	Won	
2024	The Game Awards 2024	Best Mobile Game	Won	
2024	The Steam Awards	Game of the Year	Nominated	
2024	The Steam Awards	Most Innovative Gameplay	Nominated	
2024	The Steam Awards	Best Game on Steam Deck	Nominated	
2025	New York Game Awards	Big Apple Award for Best Game of the Year	Nominated	
2025	New York Game Awards	Off Broadway Award for Best Indie Game	Nominated	
2025	28th Annual D.I.C.E. Awards	Game of the Year	Nominated	
2025	28th Annual D.I.C.E. Awards	Outstanding Achievement for an Independent Game	Won	
2025	28th Annual D.I.C.E. Awards	Outstanding Achievement in Game Design	Nominated	
2025	28th Annual D.I.C.E. Awards	Mobile Game of the Year	Won	
2025	28th Annual D.I.C.E. Awards	Strategy/Simulation Game of the Year	Won	
2025	Independent Games Festival	Seumas McNally Grand Prize	Honorable mention	
2025	Independent Games Festival	Excellence in Design	Nominated	
2025	Game Developers Choice Awards	Game of the Year	Won	
2025	Game Developers Choice Awards	Best Audio	Honorable mention	
2025	Game Developers Choice Awards	Best Debut	Won	
2025	Game Developers Choice Awards	Best Design	Won	
2025	Game Developers Choice Awards	Innovation Award	Won	
2025	Game Developers Choice Awards	Best Visual Art	Honorable mention	
2025	NAVGTR Awards 2024	Gameplay Design, New IP	Nominated	
2025	NAVGTR Awards 2024	Game, Puzzle	Won	
2025	21st British Academy Games Awards	Best Game	Nominated	
2025	21st British Academy Games Awards	Debut Game	Won	
2025	21st British Academy Games Awards	Game Design	Nominated	
2025	21st British Academy Games Awards	New Intellectual Property	Nominated	
2025	Develop:Star Awards	Publishing Star (Playstack)	Won	
2025	GEM Awards	GEMA Indie 2024	Won	
2025	GEM Awards	Best Strategy Game	Won	
2025	GEM Awards	Best Mobile Game	Won	
2025	Apple Design Awards	Delight and Fun	Won	
