= Die in the Dungeon =

2026 roguelike video game

- Developer: Atico Games
- Publishers: HypeTrain Digital, Sidekick Publishing
- Engine: Unity
- Platforms: macOS; Nintendo Switch; Windows
- Release: 1 May 2026: macOS, Win; 1 May 2026; Switch; 17 September 2026
- Genre: Roguelike
- Mode: Single-player

Die in the Dungeon is a 2026 turn-based roguelike video game. The player fights a series of enemies by rolling and placing dice, and can obtain relics, potions, new dice, as well as upgrade dice between battles. In roguelike fashion, the game is structured into pseudorandom runs.

The game was developed by Spanish indie developer Atico and published by HypeTrain Digital and Sidekick Publishing, and began life as a 2021 game jam game. A prologue, Die in the Dungeon: Origins, was released in December 2023, and the full game entered early access in February 2025 and was released in May 2026.

Reviewers compared Die in the Dungeon to Slay the Spire both positively and negatively, while generally describing the gameplay as similar. The gameplay design, strategic depth, and visual style were generally praised.

On the 7th of March 2025, a community initiative was initiated by user TwoFort to create a wiki for the game on Miraheze. This wiki was then officially recognised by ATICO on the 11th, and hence dubbed the Official Wiki for the game Die in the Dungeon. This official validation also came with the addition of a wiki channel to the DitD community Discord server, and the eventual creation of a DitD Wiki Discord server one month later on the 11th of April 2025.

== Gameplay ==
A battle in Die in the Dungeon. The grid for placing dice is in the center, and the player's available dice are along the bottom.

Die in the Dungeon is a turn-based roguelike game, in the roguelike deckbuilder subgenre and self described as a "dicebuilder". The player fights a series of enemies by rolling and placing dice into a grid. The default grid is a 3x3 diamond. Placing dice has an effect based on their color and rolled number: for example, red dice deal damage equal to the number and blue dice block incoming damage equal to the number. The relative placement of dice also changes their effects. Dice vary in their number of faces and the numbers on those faces: there are four-, six-, and eight-sided dice. Dice can also have properties added that change how they function: for example, the "Heavy" property causes dice to remain on the board between turns.

The gameplay revolves around managing three resources relics, potions, and dice. relics provide players permanent buffs that can be used thought the run and are commonly acquired thru events or shops. potions are a onetime use buff that is commonly acquired after a battle or in shops. dice are the primary resources modified in the game and are commonly acquired after battles or in events; however, the upgrades are acquired during events or are purchased from the vendors.

Between battles, the player can obtain more dice, upgrade, potions, and relics for their set of dice, which generally serves to increase the numbers on a die's faces. Battles are grouped into worlds, each of which ends with a boss, and each run through the game consists of three worlds. The player can select different characters for each run, each with a unique board for placing dice, set of starting dice, and skills.

== Development and release ==
Die in the Dungeon was developed by Atico Games, a developer based in Madrid. The first version, originally titled Die in the Dungeon and later renamed to Die in the Dungeon CLASSIC, was produced for February 2021 game jam Brackey's Game Jam and was released on itch.io. Atico worked on the itch.io version in their spare time from 2021 until 2023, describing the game at that point as a hobby and its marketing as organic. In 2023, the team transitioned to working on a commercial release on Steam, and a prologue, Die in the Dungeon: Origins, was released in December 2023.

The game was released in early access on Steam in February 2025. It was published by HypeTrain Digital and Sidekick Publishing, and was fully released on 1 May 2026 for Windows and macOS. A port for Nintendo Switch was released on 17 September 2026. After release, Atico announced a board game adaptation was in development by Roomiz Games.

== Reception ==
PC Gamer's Jonathan Bolding described Die in the Dungeon: Origins as "taking the roguelite framework and applying it in an interesting-looking way by having you place your dice in a grid for synergies and effects". Rachel Watts of Rock Paper Shotgun said the prologue was "concise and densely packed". Writing for GamesRadar, Austin Wood praised the demo, describing it as a fusion of Dicey Dungeons and Slay the Spire and describing himself as "obsessed". Bolding criticized the game's marketing as sensational, noting 2011 board game Quarriors and 2023 video game Astrea: Six-Sided Oracles as previous examples of dice-building mechanics.

Reviewing the full game, AV Club's Elijah Gonzalez described it as standing out in the crowded field of roguelike deckbuilders, citing its "combining gratifying puzzles with deep customization that lends space for player expression". Gonzalez additionally complimented the art and soundtrack. Writing for The Verge, Jay Peters described the strategy as deep, but criticized the length of runs. Describing the game as derivative of Slay the Spire but nevertheless interesting, he said that "It takes a lot of inspiration from Slay the Spire, but that's ok." 4Gamer.net praised the strategy, build variety, and pixel art.
