= Northernlion =

Canadian internet personality (born 1988)

- Born: Ryan Gary Letourneau; November 28, 1988 (age 37); Kingston, Ontario, Canada
- Education: Queen's University (BS)
- Occupations: Twitch streamer; YouTuber
- Spouse: Kate Letourneau (m. 2014)
- Children: 1

Twitch information
- Channel: Northernlion
- Years active: 2010–present
- Genre: Video gaming
- Followers: 968,000

YouTube information
- Channel: Northernlion
- Years active: 2006–present
- Genres: Video gaming; podcast
- Subscribers: 1.39 million
- Views: 1.85 billion
- Last updated: November 4, 2026

Ryan Gary Letourneau (born November 28, 1988), better known as Northernlion (NL), is a Canadian streamer and YouTuber. Letourneau created his YouTube channel in 2006 and gained an online following through his Let's Play videos of indie games. He has been credited with bringing popularity to several indie titles. On Twitch, Letourneau created the "Northernlion Live Super Show" variety stream series, which ran from 2013 to 2021. He has received three nominations from The Streamer Awards.

== Career ==
=== YouTube ===
Letourneau created his YouTube channel, "Northernlion", on May 30, 2006. In 2011, he began regularly posting content to YouTube full-time, mainly consisting of Let's Play videos of various indie games. That same year, Letourneau began uploading gaming videos of The Binding of Isaac, which became one of his most popular Let's Play series and helped garner him an online following. Let's Play videos of The Binding of Isaac, including Letourneau's, were credited by game developer Edmund McMillen with bringing popularity to the game and boosting its sales. In 2013, Letourneau interviewed McMillen about The Binding of Isaac, where the developer stated that the popularity of the game convinced him to make Rebirth. One year later, Letourneau attended the Game Developers Conference to discuss the impact of Let's Play videos on the sales of various video games, also referencing how the popularity of his Binding of Isaac videos led to increased exposure of the game.

Letourneau has been credited with popularizing other video games with his gaming videos, such as Enter the Gungeon, Slay the Spire, Monster Train, Umamusume: Pretty Derby, and Balatro. Bob McCann of TechRadar described Letourneau as "[managing] to be both informative and talk through his tactical choices during games, which many viewers find useful". Jonathan Lee of Yahoo! News has said that Letourneau is "known for his quick wit".

=== Twitch ===
Letourneau created his Twitch channel, "Northernlion", on August 5, 2010. On February 25, 2013, Letourneau uploaded the first "Northernlion Live Super Show" (NLSS), a three-hour stream in which he and his co-hosts would play a variety of video games, usually divided into three one-hour-long segments. He and other members of the show were included in the indie game Spelunky 2 as an easter egg. The final episode of the NLSS aired on January 21, 2021.

In 2016, Letourneau participated in the "Champions of Fire" esports tournament sponsored by Amazon, where he competed and won against Twitch streamer Adam "B0aty" Lyne in Pac-Man 256. In 2020, Letourneau was invited to stream the video game Among Us with United States congresswoman Alexandria Ocasio-Cortez and Canadian member of Parliament Jagmeet Singh; the stream also featured internet personalities Hasan Piker, ContraPoints, Corpse Husband, Sykkuno and xQc. Letourneau received a nomination in the 2021 Streamer Awards (taking place in March 2022) for the category of "Best Strategy Game Streamer". A 2023 livestream where Letourneau played Luck Be a Landlord was the initial inspiration for developer LocalThunk to create Balatro, which would go on to win multiple awards including Best Independent Game at The Game Awards 2024.

In September 2026, Letourneau criticized longtime friend and collaborator Dan Gheesling following Gheesling's three-day livestreamed participation in a US Army sponsored event on Twitch. Gheesling and Letourneau had collaborated for more than a decade through Twitch, including as members of Team Unity, (Note: Team Unity was a weekly streaming collaboration consisting of Ryan Letourneau (Northernlion), Dan Gheesling, Michael A. L. Fox (MALF), and Apollo Willems (DumbDog or LastGreyWolf)) a spinoff of the NLSS. (Note: Northernlion Live Super Show, a variety livestream show ran by Northernlion on Twitch.) Letourneau described Gheesling's stream as "unacceptable," saying that its extensive use of military imagery and presentation of the Army as appealing to viewers was "so far beyond the bounds of what is acceptable to me," adding that "Of course I hate the US Army; they’re threatening to take over my country [Canada]!" Letourneau said that fan reaction towards the Northernlion Supercruise earlier that year had influenced his approach to sponsorships, describing how he did not want to accept them if they were "even a few percent over the line" because he wanted his community to feel that his stream was a safe space.

== Other ventures ==
On April 13, 2026, Letourneau and fellow streamer Dan Gheesling announced the "Northernlion Supercruise", a six-day cruise event that was set to take place in March 2027 with ticket prices starting at $1,800. On April 16, Letourneau announced that the event had been canceled, citing safety concerns, and began issuing refunds. The same month, Letourneau announced his involvement in funding and publishing the indie game Demon Bluff, alongside streamer Ludwig Ahgren, under the latter's Offbrand label.

== Personal life ==
Letourneau was born on November 28, 1988, and grew up in a rural area outside of Kingston, Ontario. He resides in Vancouver, British Columbia.

Letourneau married Kate Letourneau in May 2014. Kate is a Twitch streamer and YouTuber who primarily creates content under the alias Lovelymomo consisting of Let's Plays and content with their daughter. Their daughter was born on September 28, 2020. The Letourneaus use the alias "Luna" to refer to her online, in order to protect her privacy.

== Awards and nominations ==
Ceremony	Year	Category	Result	Ref.
The Streamer Awards	2021	Best Strategy Game Streamer	Nominated	
The Streamer Awards	2024	Best Strategy Game Streamer	Nominated	
The Streamer Awards	2025	Best Strategy Game Streamer	Nominated	
