= Tainted Grail =

Tainted Grail may refer to:

- Tainted Grail: Conquest, 2021 video game
- Tainted Grail: The Fall of Avalon, 2025 video game
