= CloverPit =

2025 video game

- Game key art
- Developer: Panik Arcade
- Publisher: Future Friends Games
- Platforms: Windows; Xbox Series X/S; PlayStation 5 PlayStation 4 Nintendo Switch; Nintendo Switch 2 iOS; Android
- Release: Windows; September 26, 2025; Xbox Series X/S; November 20, 2025; iOS, Android; December 17, 2025; PlayStation 5, PlayStation 4, Nintendo Switch, Nintendo Switch 2; August 13, 2026
- Genre: Rogue-lite
- Mode: Single-player

CloverPit is a 2025 rogue-lite psychological horror indie video game developed by Italian studio Panik Arcade and published by Future Friends Games. The game tasks the player with paying-off an increasing debt using a slot machine.

The game released on Steam on September 26, 2025 and has since sold over 1 million copies.

== Gameplay ==
The slot machine giving points based on how many of given icon was displayed in a row

CloverPit is a first-person rogue-lite with elements of strategy and psychological horror. Inspired by Balatro and Buckshot Roulette, the game takes place within a rusty cell with a slot machine. The player is tasked with using the slot machine to pay-off an ever increasing debt in an ATM at the end of each round; failing to do so will result in the player being dropped through a trapdoor below them, ending their run. To aid in the process, the player can encounter over 150 different items with varying effects to exploit the slot machine to their benefit.

== Development and release ==
CloverPit was announced on April 10, 2025, with a demo launched the same day. The demo was later featured as a part of Steam Next Fest. The game was later revealed to release on September 3 later that same year. However, following the sudden announcement of the release date for Hollow Knight: Silksong, CloverPit was delayed by a few weeks in order to not clash with the latter's release, with Panik responding "We like a gamble, but this one is too risky lol." The game was released on September 26, 2025.

The Xbox Series X/S version was released as a Day One title on Xbox Game Pass on November 20, 2025, following the Xbox Partner Review broadcast. A mobile version released for iOS and Android on December 17, 2025. The Unholy Fusion DLC, which adds a new ending and Surgery Machine for fusing charms, released on April 9, 2026.

== Reception ==
=== Critical reception ===
Reception

Aggregate score
Aggregator	Score
Metacritic	77/100

Review scores
Publication	Score
Gamekult	7/10
PC Gamer (UK)	62/100

According to review aggregator website Metacritic, CloverPit received an average score of 77/100 based on 12 reviews.

=== Sales ===
Following its announcement, the game was wishlisted on Steam over 100,000 times. After its appearance at Steam Next Fest, the demo had been downloaded over 680,000 times, and was listed among the top 20 Next Fest demos as well as the top 100 most-wishlisted games on Steam. Within a day of the game's release, CloverPit had sold 100,000 copies. Less than two months later, it had sold 1 million copies.

== See also ==
- Luck Be a Landlord (2023) - A roguelike deck-building indie game where the player operates and customises a slot machine
