= Anthony Skordi =

British-American actor

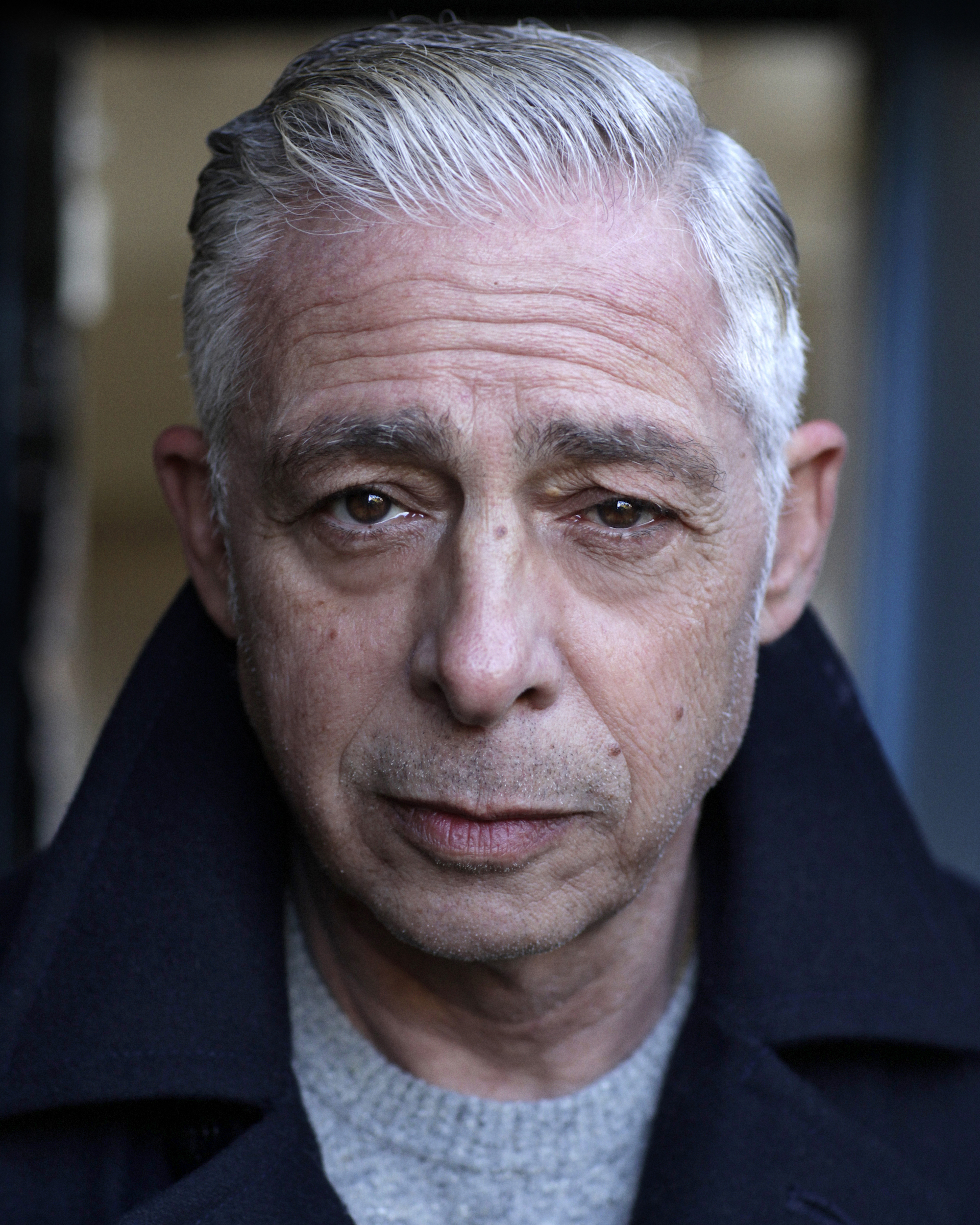
- Occupations: Actor, voice actor
- Years active: 1994-present
- Known for: Carlo Gambino in The Offer

Anthony George Skordi was born in London, England, to Greek Cypriot parents. He also has Greek, Southern Italian, Russian, Belarusian, and Scottish ancestry. He trained at Drama Centre London and began his professional acting career in the early 1990s.

== Career ==
Trained at the Drama Centre London. Some of his early roles include British television series including episodes of Soldier Soldier, The Bill and Thief Takers.

Skordi wrote, produced and starred in the one-man show Onassis, The Play at the Stella Adler theater to favorable reviews, being praised as a "Master of Storytelling". It was originally planned to bring the play to New York City in 2020, but the theatre production had to be delayed due to the restrictions put into place during the COVID-19 pandemic in the United States. He performed off Broadway to critical acclaim Feb-March 2022 at The American Theatre of Actors. Though he had been providing narration for commercials and audio books, he was introduced to a new audience through voice acting in video games, his first role being God of War III, alongside other notable actors Kevin Sorbo, Gideon Emery, and Rip Torn. He went on to provide voices for The Elder Scrolls V: Skyrim, the Mass Effect series, Diablo III, and starred as Valenos, the Dealer, in the Hand of Fate series by Defiant Development. In 2017, he had a prominent role in Star Wars Battlefront II, both as a voice actor and motion capture actor, as Admiral Garrick Versio. He had also previously provided motion capture for Sleeping Dogs. Since 2015, Skordi has also been narrating the audio for the drama series John Sinclair – Demon Hunter.

His work in television continued in the United States, where he featured in episodes of Scorpion, The Blacklist, The Last Ship, and others. British TV appearance as series regular as Silas Manatos in Prime Suspect 1973. In 2019, he appeared as the Caliph of Oran in the miniseries Catch-22.

Skordi is also a film actor. A short film portraying the Armenian genocide, Straw Dolls features Anthony Skordi in the lead role as Ahmet, a conflicted Turkish soldier. He acted alongside Kevin Spacey in the short film Envelope. Skordi portrayed Father Nicolas in Don Quixote, which was featured at the Palm Springs Film Festival in 2015. He also appeared as August in Stage Mother, playing opposite Jacki Weaver.

Anthony recently portrayed Silas Manatos in Prime Suspect 1973 Carlo Gambino in The Offer Vincent Thiago in The Last Frontier

In addition to his work in the US, he has worked in the UK, Greece, Cyprus, Italy, Spain and Brazil.

== Filmography ==
=== Film ===
Year	Title	Role	Notes
2012	A Green Story	Alexander	
2014	Lucky Stiff	Nicky	
2015	Don Quixote	Father Nicolas	
2019	The Queen's Corgi	Nelson	
2020	Stage Mother	August	
2022	The Seven Faces of Jane	Pinky	
2023	Rise of The Footsoldier: Vengeance	Mo	
2025	Long Shadows	Father Giovanni Rossetti	Post-production

=== Television ===
Year	Title	Role	Notes
1993–1996	The Bill	Dave	
1994	Soldier Soldier	Young Man	
1996	Thief Takers	Thaso Kyriados	
1999-2000	The Drew Carey Show	Announcer	
2010	Men of a Certain Age	Tilburn	
2010	Detroit 1-8-7	Christof	
2014–2015	Scorpion	Nemos	
2017	The Blacklist	Stratos Sarantos	
2017	The Last Ship	Alex	
2017	Shooter	Maltese Consul	
2017	Prime Suspect 1973	Silas Manatos	
2019	Catch-22	Caliph of Oran	Miniseries
2020	Moriarty the Patriot	Narrator	Anime
2022	The Offer	Carlo Gambino	Miniseries
2025	Law & Order: Organized Crime	Rocco Spezzano	2 episodes
2025	The Last Frontier	Vincent Thiago	5 episodes
2026	EastEnders	Russell Delaney	

=== Video games ===
Year	Title	Role	Notes
2011	Dungeon Siege III	Maru-yatum	
2012	Mass Effect 3	Leviathan	Mass Effect 3: Leviathan DLC Pack
2012	The Elder Scrolls V: Skyrim	Garyn Ienth, Bradyn, Naris Mavani, Rirns Llervu Saden, Slitter, Ulves Romoran	Dragonborn DLC-pack
2015	Hand of Fate	The Dealer	
2017	Hand of Fate 2	The Dealer	
2017	Star Wars Battlefront II	Admiral Garrick Versio	Voice and likeness (motion capture)
2018	Assassin's Creed Odyssey	Pythagoras	
2022	Star Wars: The Old Republic	Tenebrae	
2022	Diablo Immortal	(Voice)	
2023	Forspoken	Robian Keen	
2025	Hordes of Fate: A Hand of Fate Adventure	The Dealer	
2025	Mafia: The Old Country	Agostino "Tino" Russo	Voice and likeness (motion capture)
