= One Step From Eden =

2020 video game

- Developer: Thomas Moon Kang
- Publisher: Humble Bundle
- Artists: Thomas Moon Kang; Sarin Singhasaneh; Larry Boyd
- Composer: Keisuke Hayase
- Platforms: Linux; macOS; Microsoft Windows; Nintendo Switch; PlayStation 4; Xbox One
- Release: March 26, 2020: Linux, macOS, Windows, Switch; March 26, 2020; PlayStation 4; June 14, 2020; Xbox One; November 11, 2021
- Genres: Action, roguelike deck-building
- Modes: Single-player, multiplayer

One Step From Eden is a roguelike action video game created by American independent developer Thomas Moon Kang, and published by Humble Bundle. Following a successful crowdfunding campaign, it was released for Linux, macOS, Microsoft Windows and Nintendo Switch in March 2020, and later ported to PlayStation 4 in June 2020, and Xbox One in November 2021.

One Step From Eden features grid-based movement and combat mechanics similar to Mega Man Battle Network series, alongside deck-building gameplay and choice-based story progression. It received mostly positive reviews upon release, with praise for its visuals, combat, and controls, and criticism for its multiplayer modes and high difficulty.

A follow-up titled Duelists of Eden was released on Steam for PC, Mac, and Linux on March 7, 2024.

== Gameplay ==
The navigation takes place on a map with branching paths leading to combat encounters, treasure chests, and shops. The combat in One Step From Eden takes place on a 4x4 grid, where player can move the character one square at a time, and, provided they have enough mana, attack using spells in their deck; these take on the form of various close and long range attacks, and some apply status effects or restore health. The enemy moves on a separate 4x4 grid, and their spells follow patterns the player needs to dodge in time. Some battles have special conditions, such as the presence of non-player characters to save or defeat.

Each completed encounter awards the player with experience points, and choice to add new spells to their deck. Every level up and some events lead to artifacts, items with positive and negative passive abilities. Falling in battle sends the player back to the start with all gained spells and artifacts lost, but progress in the completion bar remains, which eventually leads to unlocking new characters and spells for use in future attempts.

== Development ==
Development of the game began in April 2016, with Thomas Moon Kang naming the "Megaman Battle Network sized void that no other game could fill" as reason for creating the title. The theme and feel were in part influenced by The World Ends With You (2007); the title "One Step From Eden" is also a reference to the game. Other inspirations during development include FTL: Faster Than Light (2012), Nuclear Throne (2015), and Slay the Spire (2019).

The game was put on Kickstarter on January 3, 2019, seeking $15,000 in funding, alongside a free demo featuring one zone and three bosses from the final game. Although the developer has stated that even if the goal is not met, the development will continue, the campaign hit its target in two days; over time it also reached additional stretch goals to include a pet summoning mechanic, release the game on Nintendo Switch, and commission music from VA-11 Hall-A composer Michael Kelly.

A deck-based fighting game follow-up published by Thomas Moon Kang, titled Duelists of Eden, is set to release for Microsoft Windows via Steam in 2023.

=== Release ===
In February 2020, publisher Humble Bundle announced it would publish One Step From Eden digitally on March 26, 2020, for previously promised Linux, macOS, Windows, and Nintendo Switch platforms. The port for PlayStation 4 was released on June 14, 2020. The game would later see a physical release by Flyhigh Works for Nintendo Switch in Japan on February 25, 2021, and is planned to be released physically for both consoles by Limited Run Games in North America. The Xbox One version was announced in October 2021. It was released on November 11, 2021, and was added to the Xbox Game Pass service for console and PC on the same date.

== Reception ==
Reception

Aggregate scores
Aggregator	Score
Metacritic	PC: 82/100; NS: 74/100
OpenCritic	68% recommend

Review score
Publication	Score
Nintendo World Report	7/10

The PC version of One Step From Eden received "generally favorable reviews", and Nintendo Switch version received "mixed or average reviews", according to review aggregator Metacritic. Fellow review aggregator OpenCritic assessed that the game received strong approval, being recommended by 68% of critics.

Shin Imai of IGN Japan called it "a revolutionary title", and a game "anyone should try". Nintendo Life's Stuart Gipp found One Step From Eden to be "an exceptionally well-made game with great combat and responsive controls" and praised its visuals and sound, but criticized the game's slow rate of unlockables and unforgiving difficulty. The steep difficulty curve was also criticized by Jordan Rudek of Nintendo World Report, who further noted that it is "sorely lacking in accessibility options", but was generally positive about the game due to its interesting premise and variety in spells and perks. Nintendo Enthusiast's Miguel Moran complimented the game's depth in its single-player, but found that it doesn't translate well to cooperative mode, that has two players "awkwardly split one deck instead of letting them use their own", and player versus player mode, that "sticks you with predetermined decks that you have no way of studying".
