= Dungeons & Degenerate Gamblers =

2024 video game

- Developer: Purple Moss Collectors
- Publisher: Yogscast Games
- Platforms: Linux; macOS; Windows
- Release: WW: August 8, 2024
- Genre: Roguelike deck-building
- Mode: Single-player

Dungeons & Degenerate Gamblers is a 2024 roguelike deck-building game based on blackjack. It was developed by Purple Moss Collectors and published by Yogscast Games.

== Gameplay ==
Players attempt to win card battles against opponents, some of whom are fantastical. Like blackjack, players sum up the value of their cards and attempt to get as close to 21 as possible without going over. Instead of losing money, the loser takes damage to their hit points, more if they bust. Cards can have special effects, such as causing additional damage to the loser, healing the winner, or generating money. Players can spend money to get more bonuses after a card battle, such as healing, exchanging cards, or adding new cards to their deck.

Cards are not limited to traditional decks, such as an NFT-themed card that has a random value when played, or a Geralt of Rivia-themed card that can burn opponent's cards. Some are themed around the opponent, such as necromancer who plays special grave-themed cards that can lower the value of players' cards, or a boss who can play a "21 of clubs" that is an instant win unless it is negated. It uses a pixel art aesthetic.

== Development ==
Dungeon & Degenerate Gamblers was created by solo developer Michael Davis under his studio name Purple Moss Collectors. The concept was inspired by a task from the British show Taskmaster where players had to memorize the order of a deck of cards with non-standard cards. This gave Davis the idea to build a game around blackjack using cards that could create unique and comical effects.

Yogscast Games released Dungeons & Degenerate Gamblers for Linux, macOS, and Windows on August 8, 2024. A 2.0 update with additional content was released on July 30, 2026.

== Reception ==
Dungeons & Degenerate Gamblers received "mixed or average" reviews, according to review aggregator Metacritic. Fellow review aggregator OpenCritic assessed that the game received fair approval, being recommended by 63% of critics.

Rock Paper Shotgun and PC Gamer criticized the randomness, which they said could be very frustrating. However, Rock Paper Shotgun praised its creativity and recommended Dungeons & Degenerate Gamblers on the strength of being able to thoroughly defeat opponents with deadly combos. Though they did not recommend it, PC Gamer said that patches to remove some of the design decisions that they found frustrating could make it a great game. TouchArcade said people unfamiliar with card games may have difficulty at first, but the reviewer said it was among his favorite Steam Deck games so far in 2024. Siliconera said Dungeons & Degenerate Gamblers had received undocumented patches while they were playing it, leading them to not be sure how much of their experience was representative. They concluded that it was fun but not as long-lasting as Balatro.
