= Mari0 =

2012 indie video game

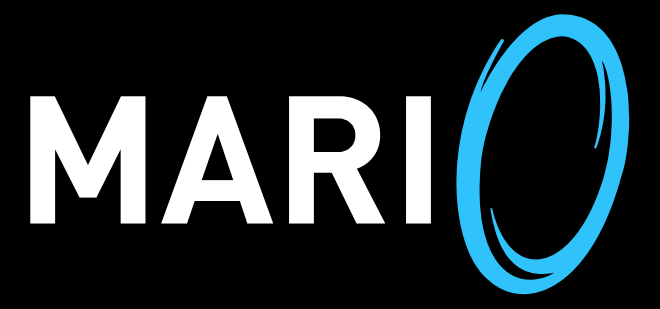
- Developer: Maurice Guégan
- Publisher: Stabyourself.net
- Designers: Maurice Guégan; Sašo Smolej
- Series: Mario (unofficial); Portal (unofficial)
- Engine: LÖVE
- Platforms: Windows, macOS, Linux
- Release: March 3, 2012
- Genres: Platform, puzzle
- Modes: Single-player, multiplayer

Mari0 (pronounced "mari-zero") is a 2012 side-scrolling platform video game developed by German indie developer Maurice Guégan with creative input from Sašo Smolej and released onto their website Stabyourself.net. It combines gameplay elements from Nintendo's Super Mario series and Valve's Portal series. The game features Mario armed with a "portal gun", the main game mechanic in the Portal series, allowing him to create two inter-spatial portals on two-dimensional surfaces which can transport himself, enemies and other objects through them. It was made with the LÖVE game framework.

Development began in 2011 as a direct port of the original Super Mario Bros. with no clear gimmick in mind. The pair's first idea was to implement a four-player multiplayer system similar to the one seen in New Super Mario Bros. Wii – however, after they viewed a Dorkly video entitled Mario With A Portal Gun, they settled on the idea of including a portal gun and other elements from the Portal series. The game quickly gained traction through online blogs and news sites, and has been downloaded nearly 1.6 million times. It was well received by critics for its creativity and simplistic concept. An update to the game titled Mari0: Special Edition was planned for release at an unknown date; however, it was cancelled in 2015 following technical constraints.

== Gameplay ==
The title screen of the game with a custom outfit equipped on the player

The core game of Mari0 plays directly from the 8-bit Super Mario Bros. 2D platform game, where the player controls Mario via the keyboard, running and jumping through levels, avoiding or jumping on enemies to defeat them, while collecting coins to earn points towards their score. The game adds the concept of the "portal gun" from the Portal series; the player can click with the mouse device on two separate surfaces on the level to create a portal between them. This can be used for a number of gameplay options, often using vertical momentum entering one portal to "fling" the Mario character horizontally out of the other portal, but will also affect enemies and other game elements in similar manners.

The game features two main level packs: the original Super Mario Bros. levels and a level pack containing puzzles involving the portal system. The game also has multiple built-in DLC levels created by fans of the game.

The core game uses the level designs from the original Super Mario Bros. as well as sets of test chambers inspired by Portal's Aperture Science. A level editor, along with different graphic sets and shaders, are provided to create new content. Up to four players can cooperatively play in the game.

== Development and release ==
Mari0 began as a recreation of Super Mario Bros. created by Maurice Guégan in the LÖVE framework. He began the project largely as a creative exercise but also in part because he believed similar recreations of the time failed to match the controls of the original game. From there, Guégan and his friend Sašo Smolej were tasked with finding a purpose for the recreation. Their initial idea was to incorporate the multiplayer gameplay of New Super Mario Bros. Wii. However, after seeing a video on the humor site Dorkly entitled Mario With A Portal Gun, the pair decided that they would add a portal gun as well.

Guégan, the lead programmer of Stabyourself.net games, began development on this functionality in January 2011. He received creative input from Smolej, the developer and spokesperson of the Stabyourself.net website. The pair frequently created blog posts keeping followers up to date with the latest Mari0 developments, including a month-long screenshot marathon of Mari0 updates. Several teasers and videos were posted and a speculated release date of Christmas 2011 was proposed, although this was later pushed towards New Year's Eve 2011, and then postponed further until beta testing had been completed and they were satisfied with the release.

The final release date was posted as a puzzle which the community quickly decoded to reveal March 3, 2012, as the release date. An accompanying countdown timer was also placed on the Stabyourself.net homepage.

The first official release was made alongside the publishing of a trailer video. Several updates were released shortly after the game's launch to add a few new features, extra sets of levels, and fix many bugs. The code was also uploaded to a public GitHub repository to allow contributions from the community. Recent updates to the repository include minor bug fixes and updates to newer versions of the LÖVE framework. These changes were made in part to allow tool-assisted speedruns to be created for the game which were later showcased at the semiannual Games Done Quick event.

On May 1, 2012, an update to the game titled Mari0: Special Edition was announced. It was planned to feature the originally delayed online multiplayer along with several other features for use in custom levels such as vertical maps, custom characters, and more elements from Portal 2. Several beta versions were uploaded to the Stabyourself.net forums in early 2014 for the community to give feedback on. Each beta was tagged with a date, a build number, and sometimes a code name which would usually describe the changes in that build. Development seemed to stop, however, after the 9th build, "enemies", was published on March 8, 2014. After over a year of silence about the update, the team confirmed it was cancelled on August 12, 2015.

On September 27, 2017, Guégan began to rewrite Mari0 as Nintendo 3DS homebrew. As the device utilizes a mobile processor, extra care had to be put in to ensuring the game was highly performant. On January 1, 2018, he dropped support for the 3DS due to the homebrew platform's immaturity and shifted his focus towards recreating Super Mario Bros. 3 with portals for PC platforms. It was at this time that the project assumed the name Mari0 2, sometimes known internally and within the community as Mari3. It was also around this time that Maurice began regularly streaming his development progress on Twitch. The game features what the team described as a "massive upgrade to the portal system" which allows portals to be used with the newly added sloped surfaces and overhauls their visual design. On January 4, 2022, the game was uploaded to a public GitHub repository under the MIT License. In December 2022, the team stated that the game was very early in development and may never be released.

== Reception ==
Mari0 has been covered on various technology and video game websites. It has gained a lot of attention on sites such as YouTube and Reddit. The game has been well received on various video game blog sites. John Walker of Rock Paper Shotgun stated "If it doesn't make you gasp and want to post it to the rest of the internet, then I simply don't understand you." It was covered by Wired and Joystiq.

One year after the release, the game had accumulated 1.6 million downloads from the website according to the developers.

== See also ==
- List of unofficial Mario media
- List of open-source video games
