= Signs of the Sojourner =

- Developer: Echodog Games
- Director: Dyala Kattan-Wright
- Engine: Unity
- Platforms: Microsoft Windows; PlayStation 4; Nintendo Switch; Xbox One
- Release: May 14, 2020
- Genres: Deck-building; Role-playing
- Mode: Single-player

Signs of the Sojourner is a roguelike deck-building game with role-playing story elements developed by Echodog Games. It was released for Microsoft Windows on May 14, 2020, with additional console support arriving in March 2021. The game features a card-based puzzle game meant to evoke dialog and communication, with multiple endings based on the player's relationships and temperament.

== Development ==
The game was crowdfunded on Indiegogo in September 2019.

== Reception ==
Signs of the Sojourner received generally favorable reviews from critics, according to the review aggregation website Metacritic. Fellow review aggregator OpenCritic assessed that the game received strong approval, being recommended by 67% of critics. Edge magazine called it "a game of rare thematic consistency and mechanical brilliance". Eurogamer praised its colorful puzzle-game and story, while noting its exotic environment and narrative choices. Destructoid commented that its "interplay between mechanics and storytelling is absolutely brilliant", calling it "one of the most cohesive narrative games" while also criticizing the interference from "frustrating" mechanics. Rock Paper Shotgun similarly praised the card system for evoking relationships and personality, while also criticizing the difficulty of the game as it goes on.

It was nominated for Excellence in Design at Independent Games Festival in 2021.
