= Slay the Spire II =

Upcoming roguelike deck-building game

- Developer: Mega Crit
- Publisher: Mega Crit
- Engine: Godot
- Platforms: Windows; macOS; Linux
- Release: WW: March 5, 2026 (early access)
- Genre: Roguelike deck-building
- Modes: Single-player, multiplayer

Slay the Spire II is a roguelike deck-building game developed and published by Mega Crit. Similar to its 2019 predecessor Slay the Spire, players select a character to traverse multiple levels of the Spire while collecting and playing cards to defeat monsters. Slay the Spire II introduces three new characters in addition to three returning characters, as well as support for four player co-operative play.

An early access version was released for Windows, macOS, and Linux in March 2026.

== Gameplay ==
Gameplay of The Defect fighting a monster

At the start of the game, players select one of six characters, each with a different deck of starting cards and different pool of cards that can be gained throughout a run. These include three returning characters from Slay the Spire: the Ironclad, a demonically-infused warrior; the Silent, a shifty huntress armed with daggers and poison; and the Defect, a robot with an arsenal of elemental orbs. Three all-new characters were also added: the Necrobinder, a vengeful lich with a large skeleton hand companion called Osty, which can attack and shield her from incoming damage; the Regent, an arrogant cosmic being who can forge a sovereign blade and who uses and manages "stars" as an additional resource for many of his cards; and the Fool, a whimsical bard, jester, and archer character who uses a bow and arrow, a variety of musical melodies, and even emotions such as sadness and joy in battle.

Once a character has been picked, the player ascends multiple floors of a spire, with each randomly-generated act shown as a map with multiple routes to reach the act's boss. New in the sequel are alternate acts where each act has two different versions, randomly selected each run. Each environment offers a different range of enemies, events and bosses. Points on the map frequently are combat scenarios with monsters, but these can also include events, campfires where the player can rest and regain health, and a shop to buy or remove cards or acquire potions or artifacts. During combat, the player takes turns with the monsters. The player is informed of the planned attack each monster will make and takes actions during their turn, playing cards with the limited energy they get each turn. Cards include attacks, defensive moves, player buffs, enemy debuffs and other effects. Losing in combat ends that run, and the player must restart the climb of the spire. As part of the metagame, completion of runs, successful or not, can unlock entries on the new Timeline/Epoch feature, which presents the history of the titular Spire and how the playable characters came to encounter it, and is also used to unlock new characters and features in the game when certain metrics are met.

New to Slay the Spire II is a co-operative mode for up to four players. Each player selects one of the characters at the start, and during combat, they can apply any healing, defensive, or buffing or debuffing effect on their allies. Cards specific for multiplayer combat will also be available during these runs. Enemies have more health, and their attacks target all players as to offset the collective strength of the players' abilities. Otherwise, all players have their own set of health, cards, and resource pool during combat, and rewards and other choices are selected individually by players. If a player character loses their health, the combat continues with the remaining players, and after combat, that downed character will be revived with one hit point. The game ends if all cooperative players fall in combat.

== Development ==
After completing Slay the Spire, Anthony Giovannetti and Casey Yano, the founders of MegaCrit, created a number of small prototypes of games, not sure of their next planned title. As the COVID-19 pandemic hit, they wanted to start focusing on their next project, which came down to one of the prototypes that Yano had developed, and a sequel to Slay the Spire which Giovanneti had ideas for. Giovannetti said the choice came down to a coin flip, which the sequel won out.

The original game was developed using LibGDX, but Yano later expressed frustration with Java due to it frequently being broken by operating system updates and its lack of console support. As a result, MegaCrit began developing the sequel in the Unity game engine by Unity Technologies. In September 2023, Unity Technologies announced a change to their runtime licensing code that was highly controversial but later reverted. When the runtime licensing change was announced, MegaCrit was one of the major indie studios that spoke out against it, and asserted they would no longer be using Unity for their game. They switched to the Godot engine shortly after this, having to update about two years' worth of development from Unity to the new engine.

While Mega Crit has published a development roadmap for early access, they have not set dates for when these targets are expected to be met to avoid rushing in new features in a sloppy way. One of the first patches made during the early access period, among other changes, reworked a few cards that players had found capable of creating powerful gameplay loops, which led to a review bombing of the game. Mega Crit released a second patch that reverted some of these changes, acknowledging the initial update was not favorable and a goal of the early access period was adjusting cards and game tuning to keep the game's challenge.

Two additional characters are confirmed to be in development to be released following the early access launch, expanding the initial five-character roster to at least seven; compared to the others, these new characters have been described as “weird” in terms of gameplay. The Fool was revealed as one of these two characters in November 2026.

== Release ==
Slay the Spire II was first announced in April 2024 with the intent to enter early access release by 2025. MegaCrit pushed off the early access release to March 2026 in September 2025 as "to make sure we're upholding the quality bar that both we and the gaming community have come to expect for early access titles". The game was available for early access release on March 5, 2026, for Linux, macOS, and Windows. Mega Crit said that the early access version is mostly feature complete, using placeholder art for some of the newer cards and items in the game, and expect most of the early access period will be to balance the game.

In a similar phenomenon to the release of the highly anticipated Hollow Knight: Silksong, the announcement of Slay the Spire II's release date caused some indie developers to reschedule their releases to avoid their games getting lost in the coverage for Slay the Spire II. On its first day of early access release, Slay the Spire II reached over 177,000 concurrent players on Steam, beating previous records held by roguelike games Hades 2 and Mewgenics, as well as exceeding the player count for Bungie's Marathon released the same day. Concurrent player count had exceeded 400,000 by the following day. MegaCrit said that sales of Slay the Spire II within the first week of early access exceeded 3 million.

Slay the Spire II saw multiple review bombs from users on Steam. Two of these were in relationship to game balance patches, with most of those submitting the negative reviews out of the China region. A third review bomb occurred around May 2026 after it was discovered that Anita Sarkeesian was listed as a consultant in the credits, with the negative reviews coming from across the globe. Sarkeesian had been a central target of the Gamergate harassment campaign, perceived by a small subset of gamers as forcing "woke" content into video games.
