= Move or Die =

2016 multiplayer video game

- Developer: Those Awesome Guys
- Publishers: PC; Those Awesome Guys; PlayStation 4; Reverb Communications, Inc.
- Engine: Löve
- Platforms: Windows, Linux, macOS, PlayStation 4, Nintendo Switch
- Release: Microsoft Windows; 21 January 2016; PlayStation 4; 5 March 2019
- Genres: Party, platformer
- Mode: Multiplayer

Move or Die is a multiplayer party platformer indie game developed by Romanian indie studio Those Awesome Guys. Move or Die was released on Microsoft Windows on 21 January 2016 and was released on PlayStation 4 on 5 March 2019.

== Gameplay ==
Move or Die is a competitive four-player game in which each player controls one colored blob whose health drops rapidly if they stop moving for a moment, and regenerates if they resume movement. Different rules or modifiers are added in each round, with additional failure states varying between modes. The challenge arises from requiring players to keep moving to win, while avoiding hazards such as death tiles or falling blocks. Players can also attempt to push each other around, including into hazards.

== Reception ==
On review aggregator Metacritic, Move or Die has received "generally favorable" reviews. Hardcore Gamer scored the game 4.5 out of 5, praising its simplicity and multiplayer gameplay, calling it "quite possibly one of the best party games on Steam".
