= Moonring =

2023 video game

- Developer: Fluttermind
- Designer: Dene Carter
- Programmer: Dene Carter
- Artist: Wayne Imlach
- Writer: Dene Carter
- Engine: LÖVE
- Platforms: Windows, macOS, Linux, Nintendo Switch
- Release: 28 September 2023
- Genre: Role-playing
- Mode: Single player

Moonring is a role-playing video game developed by Fluttermind. The studio is headed by Dene Carter, a veteran developer who had previously co-created the Fable series. Released on September 28, 2023 for Windows as freeware, Moonring is an open-world, turn-based fantasy role-playing game evocative of the Ultima series. Upon release, the game received praise from critics for the effective imitation of classic role-playing titles and the scope and detail of its open world, exploration gameplay and narrative, with several publications naming the game as one of the best indie titles of 2023.

== Gameplay ==
The user interface in Moonring is split between a top-down depiction of the game world and a text-based context menu.

Moonring is a 2D role-playing video game in which players explore an open world and procedurally-generated dungeons in the land of Caldera. The user interface is split between a top-down depiction of the world on the right and a menu on the left that displays a text-based logs of game events and player statistics. Events in the game are turn-based, with characters and enemies moving at the same pace as the player. Interaction and combat is undertaken by bumping into other objects or enemies. Health is managed with a system in which characters have a health bar and regenerating 'poise' that buffers against attacks before taking health damage. The game features a skill and progression system based on completing devotional tasks from five gods that represent a particular skill. Completing these tasks, such as discovering areas, defeating certain enemies or undertaking certain actions, awards the player points which can be spent to unlock skills and increase skill levels. Players can engage in parser-based dialogue with all non-player characters by typing in key words, with highlighted words in responses providing hints on dialogue topics.

== Development ==
Moonring was developed as a solo project by Dene Carter, a veteran developer who co-created the Fable series with Lionhead Studios. Carter stated that the game was created as a "love letter" to his experiences with early role-playing and roguelike games including the Ultima series, and hoped Moonring would recapture the spirit of that era. The game was released for free without prior announcement on Steam on 28 September 2023, with Carter stating the decision to release the game for free was because "Life is hard, COVID sucked, everyone's poor and stressed. I don't need the $300 this would make me: I'd rather take the goodwill." On 10 January 2024, Carter announced the game was in the process of being ported to the Nintendo Switch. On March 4th, 2025, Carter released Moonring DX on Steam, a paid expansion that added The Egg, a 100-floor dungeon. Moonring DX released on Nintendo Switch on November 20th, 2025.

== Reception ==
Reception

Review scores
Publication	Score
Eurogamer	4/5 stars
The Games Machine (Italy)	9/10
Multiplayer.it	9.0

Reviewers praised the game's modern reinterpretation of classic role-playing design, with several drawing comparisons to earlier games, including Ultima and Wizard's Lair. Eric van Allen of Destructoid commended the game's "sense of devotion" to the role-playing genre. Critics also praised the game's scope and attention to detail. Describing the game's world as "complex" and "truly living" Nicholas Mercurio of The Games Machine highlighted the game's "immense" and "constantly-changing" map. Simone Tagliaferri of Multiplayer.it similarly lauded the game's "grandiose" concept, "vast" game world and "intricate" plot. Caelyn Ellis of Eurogamer noted the "epic scope" of the game, stating "there's a real sense of exploration as you learn about the world of Caldera, its history and the game's various systems and mechanics". Several publications cited Moonring in year-end best-of lists, with Eurogamer calling the game one of the best of the year. It was cited by Ellis as one of the five best games of 2023, noting that bug fixes had improved the game since release. Chris Plante of Polygon described the game as one of the year's "richest video game experiences" and best indie games of the year, highlighting the "creativity and scope" of the game and its ability to recapture the spirit of classic role-playing games.
