= Löve (game framework) =

Game development framework

LÖVE
- Release: January 13, 2008; 18 years ago
- Stable release: 11.5 / December 3, 2023; 2 years ago
- Written in: C++
- Platform: FreeBSD; OpenBSD; NetBSD; Microsoft Windows; Linux; macOS; iOS; Android
- Type: Application framework
- License: zlib license
- Website: love2d.org
- Repository: github.com/love2d/love

Löve (stylized in all caps) is a free, open-source, cross-platform framework released under the zlib license for developing video games. The framework is written in C++ and uses Lua as its scripting language, is still maintained by its original developers, and supports Microsoft Windows, macOS, Linux, Android, and iOS.

The framework's API accesses the host machine's video and sound functions through the libraries SDL and OpenGL, or since version 0.10 also OpenGL ES 2 and 3. Fonts render via the FreeType engine. A port called piLöve targets the Raspberry Pi.

The framework is frequently used in video game development competitions such as Ludum Dare. In July 2018, it was the 10th most popular game development software used by independent game developers on the site Itch.io, holding a 1.97% share.

The 2024 roguelike deck-building game Balatro, built with LÖVE, became a commercial hit without a mainstream engine such as Unity, Unreal Engine, or Godot.

== Version history ==
Version	Code name	Added	Release date
0.1.1	Santa-Power	Reading and displaying images.; Reading and playing sounds.; Loading and rendering fonts.; Keyboard and mouse support.	January 13, 2008
0.2.0	Mini-Moose	Added a screen that displays if no game is loaded.; Adding an animation system.; Added text formatting functions.	February 6, 2008
0.2.1	Impending Doom	Added many filesystem functions.; Added dedicated save folders for games.	March 29, 2008
0.3.0	Mutant Vermin	Addition of the particle system.	June 17, 2008
0.3.1	Meat Space	Bug fixes.	June 21, 2008
0.3.2	Lemony Fresh	Added several graphical functions.	July 4, 2008
0.4.0	Taco Beam	Added physics engine Box2D.	August 29, 2008
0.5.0	Salted Nuts	Added joystick support.; Support of protocols TCP/UDP using luasocket.	January 2, 2009
0.6.0	Jiggly Juice	Removed the animation system.; Added support for managing events like key presses.	December 24, 2009
0.6.1	Jiggly Juice	Added function to set and get a Box2D body's fixed rotation.; Added function to set the inertia of a Box2D body.	February 7, 2010
0.6.2	Jiggly Juice	Bug fixes.	March 6, 2010
0.7.0	Game Slave	Added support for working with fonts.	December 5, 2010
0.7.1	Game Slave	Bug fixes.	February 14, 2011
0.7.2	Game Slave	Updated libraries for Windows version.	May 4, 2011
0.8.0	Rubber Piggy	Added UTF-8 support for fonts.; Added PNG and JPEG encoding.	April 2, 2012
0.9.0	Baby Inspector	Added better multiplayer networking support.	December 13, 2013
0.9.1	Baby Inspector	Added support for opening a URL with a web or file browser.	April 1, 2014
0.9.2	Baby Inspector	Added UTF-8 encoding support.	February 14, 2015
0.10.0	Super Toast	Supports Android and iOS.; Added touch screen support.; Added video support.	December 22, 2015
0.10.1	Super Toast	Added configuration option for saving files in internal or external storage on Android devices.	February 14, 2016
0.10.2	Super Toast	Added the ability to restart the application.	October 31, 2016
11.0	Mysterious Mysteries	Support for meshes.; Various additions to shaders (such as the effect method).; Ability to record from a microphone.; Consolidation of many object methods into new methods.; Added many new formats to stencil/depth buffers.; Audio effects such as reverberation and echoing.; Added support for Base64 encoding, MD5 hashing, and more.	April 1, 2018
11.1	Mysterious Mysteries	Bug fixes.	April 15, 2018
11.2	Mysterious Mysteries	Added functions to set and get a Box2D body's transform.	November 25, 2018
11.3	Mysterious Mysteries	Added support for loading FLAC audio files.; Added support for recording audio from the microphone on Android devices.; Added support for uncompressed DirectDraw Surface files.	October 27, 2019
11.4	Mysterious Mysteries	Added native Apple Silicon support on macOS.	January 22, 2022
11.5	Mysterious Mysteries	Added new game launcher on Android for easier loading of games.	December 3, 2023
12.0	Bestest Friend		In development

== Features ==
Features include:

- OpenGL pixel shaders GLSL.
- Touchscreen for mobile devices.
- Joysticks by providing interface for connected joysticks.
- UTF-8.
- Image formats: PNG, JPEG, GIF, TGA and BMP.
- Audio formats: WAV, OGG, and MP3.
- Video formats: OGV.
- The physics engine Box2D, which can be disabled to lighten the library.
- LuaSocket library for network communications TCP/UDP.
- Lua-enet library, implementing the reliable Enet protocol over UDP.

== Notable games ==
Games made with LÖVE include:

- Kingdom Rush (2011)
- Mari0 (2012)
- Oh My Giraffe (2014)
- Blue Revolver (2016)
- Move or Die (2016)
- Warlock's Tower (2017)
- Aeon of Sands - The Trail (2018)
- BYTEPATH (2018)
- Metanet Hunter G4 (2020)
- Intravenous series (2021-2024)
- Gravity Circuit (2023)
- Moonring (2023)
- Balatro (2024)
- Arco (2024)

== Libraries and implementations ==
There are various libraries and forks of LÖVE that add OOP with inheritance and overloading, interpolations, cameras, gamestates, and more. Notable examples include:

- The Simple Tiled Implementation library lets users load levels as tiles, edit them using Tiled and display them in games, working with Box2D for collision management.
- The anim8 library loads animations, such as for characters, from an image grid into a PNG or JPEG bitmap file.
- LIKO-12 is a free platform inspired by the PICO-8 fantasy console and uses LÖVE. It lets users develop applications in a limited resolution, save and load them in a modified PNG format, and export them to HTML5 or to systems supported by LÖVE.
- Lutro is a Lua game framework for libretro, a partial port of the LÖVE API. ChaiLove offers a similar implementation in ChaiScript, an embedded, cross-platform scripting language for C++ (C++14).
- love.js is a port that lets LÖVE games run on the web via HTML5, WebGL, and Emscripten.
- g3d is a 3D engine for LÖVE, providing 3D model rendering, .obj file loading, first person movement and camera controls, perspective and orthographic projections, and 3D collisions.

== Educational use ==
LÖVE is used in Harvard University's CS50's Introduction to 2D Game Development course and is the subject of Packt Publishing's 2013 book LÖVE for Lua Game Programming.
