= Warco =

Warco: The News Game
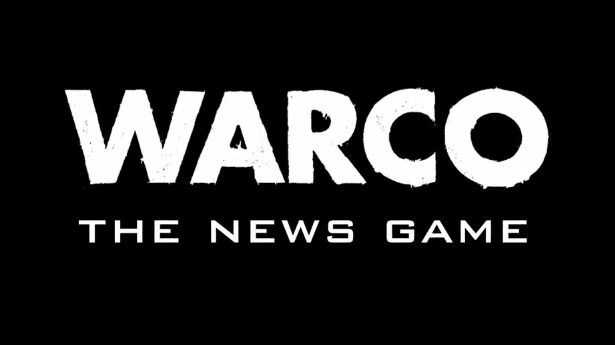
- Developer: Defiant Development
- Designers: Tony Maniaty; Robert Connolly; Morgan Jaffit
- Release: Cancelled

Warco puts players in the role of a news journalist filming live combat in war zones.

Warco: The News Game was an unreleased first-person videogame created by now defunct Australian game studio Defiant Development in collaboration with ManiatyMedia and Arenamedia. The game is made to train journalists to work in war environments. In the game, players control a journalist filming and travelling through war zones.

== Development ==
Australian journalist Tony Maniaty first conceived the idea for the game while watching his two sons playing the first-person shooter game Far Cry 2. Maniaty had previously done reporting in post-Soviet states and covered the murders of the Balibo Five in East Timor. He envisioned creating a videogame that would train journalists to work in war-torn regions. Maniaty brought his idea to Robert Connolly, a film-maker who had directed Balibo, a 2009 movie that tells the story of the five Australian journalists who were killed in the small town of Balibo in East Timor. With funding from Screen Australia and Screen NSW in the amount of A$250,000, Maniaty and Connolly worked with video game designer Morgan Jaffit of Defiant Development, a Brisbane-based studio, to create a prototype of Warco.

The project was eventually cancelled, and never released to the public.

== Reception ==
BBC News foreign correspondent Allan Little was troubled by the idea of blurring the gap between video games and actual war zones: "I think anything that encourages the view that you can understand real-life shooting wars better by playing a game has to be treated with caution". Maniaty noted that video games are used in other professions to train workers, and contested, "I would never say this game should replace proper hostile environment training but if we can save the lives of a few journalists it'll be worth it."

It was later described as "innovative and odd".
