= Trials of Fire =

- Developer: Whatboy Games
- Publisher: Whatboy Games
- Engine: Unreal Engine
- Platform: Windows
- Release: WW: April 9, 2021
- Genre: Roguelike deck-building
- Mode: Single-player

Trials of Fire is a roguelike deck-building game developed by Whatboy Games and released for Windows in 2021. It blends card mechanics with turn-based tactics in a fantasy world.

== Gameplay ==
Gameplay includes elements of roguelike deck-building games and tactical role-playing games using turn-based combat. It is set in a post-apocalyptic, dark fantasy world. Players recruit adventurers to explore a overworld map that has been procedurally generated. Up to three adventurers can be in the party out of a roster of up to nine characters. As players discover points of interest on the map, they are given the option of choosing various courses of action, which may depend on skills. Combat takes place on a tactical map. Each character has a deck of cards, which allow them to attack and move. To play a card, players expend willpower from a pool shared by all characters. Although some cards generate willpower, it is most commonly gained by discarding cards. After winning battles and completing quests, characters gain experience points and can gain new, more powerful cards. Finding powerful equipment can also give players more cards, and traveling on the map eventually adds useless cards to characters' decks to simulate exhaustion. If the entire party dies, the game ends, but new characters and cards can be unlocked for the next game.

== Development ==
Trials of Fire entered early access on May 3, 2019, and was released on April 9, 2021.

== Reception ==
Trial of Fire received positive reviews on Metacritic. PC Gamer wrote, "Trials of Fire's list of features may read like a videogame word salad, but the resulting combination makes for a fine RPG feast." In an end of the year retrospective, PC Gamer called it "perhaps the most compelling strategy game to come out in 2021". In recommending the game, Eurogamer described it as "a complex but seductive deck-building strategy game about sculpting the perfect RPG team".
