= Hand of Fate (video game) =

2015 video game

- Developer: Defiant Development
- Publisher: Defiant Development
- Composer: Jeff van Dyck
- Engine: Unity
- Platforms: Linux; macOS; Windows; PlayStation 4; Xbox One
- Release: 17 February 2015
- Genres: Action role-playing Roguelike deck-building
- Mode: Single-player

Hand of Fate is an action role-playing roguelike deck-building game developed and published by Australian studio Defiant Development for Linux, macOS, Microsoft Windows, PlayStation 4, and Xbox One, released via early access on 7 July 2014, and then in the full release on 17 February 2015. A PlayStation Vita version was announced but ultimately cancelled due to development issues.

Hand of Fate has the player work their way through randomized dungeons, generated by cards selected from customizable decks, to try to reach a final boss of each dungeon. Most of the game is played through an in-game tabletop tableau, with the player's actions narrated and executed by the mysterious Dealer, at times requiring the player to make choices to proceed. When combat occurs, the game switches to a third-person perspective brawler-style game, requiring the player to time attacks, blocks, dodges, and other abilities to defeat enemies without losing all their health. As the player progresses, they can earn tokens, which, upon completion of a dungeon (successfully or not), gain them additional cards that they can use to customize their decks for the next dungeon run.

Hand of Fate received generally positive reviews, and led to the successful crowdfunded physical variation of the game. A sequel, Hand of Fate 2, was released in November 2017.

== Gameplay ==
Hand of Fate is an action role-playing video game with roguelike and deck-building elements. The player takes the role of a nameless hero that meets a strange Dealer voiced by Anthony Skordi, in a "cabin at the end of the world". This dealer narrates the player's adventure, dealing the game's cards, rewards, penalties, lore, and commentary. He also serves as the primary antagonist for the game.

On starting a new game, the player is given a starting deck of cards, consisting of equipment, hero class, and encounter cards. The player earns more cards as they progress in the game, which they can use to customize their deck up to a fixed size. Furthermore, the dealer has his own deck from which surprising elements such as more challenging encounters and monsters are drawn that also grows as the player gains cards and progresses through the game.

In the game's Story Mode, the player must defeat thirteen bosses: twelve court cards and the Dealer himself. These bosses, representing the royalty of each suit, must be defeated in order, but the player can return to previous bosses to challenge again and unlock new rewards. After a certain number of these bosses are defeated, the player also unlocks Endless Mode, which provides an infinite number of "floors" of increasing difficulty for the player to challenge with every card they have collected up to that point.

To progress in Story Mode, the player must complete a "dungeon" by exploring two or more "floors" created by a tableau of randomized, face-down encounter cards dealt from the combined deck of both player and Dealer. In addition to random encounters, each floor also includes either an exit encounter that lets the player reach the next floor or a boss encounter on the final floor of that dungeon. The player starts with a limited amount of health, food, and initial equipment, modified by the player's selected class card and certain conditions obtained over the course of the story. To navigate each floor of the dungeon, the player moves a token across the tableau one card at a time, revealing it if face down. When each card is encountered, the Dealer narrates the event and resolves its effects.

Events can include meeting non-player characters, shops to buy and sell cards that benefit the player for the remainder of that dungeon, enemy encounters, or chance events that may benefit or hinder the player. Some of these events include a tree of options that the player can choose, while chance is presented as four shuffled cards representing rates of success or failure. Each movement step consumes food, and certain events can cause the player to gain or lose health, food, gold, blessings, curses, or equipment. The latter three can augment the player's attack power, defensive power, health, speed, or provide special abilities or conditions both inside and out of combat.

If the player encounters a monster or maze of traps, the number and type of enemy are determined by cards drawn by the Dealer (if any). The game then enters a third-person perspective action mode, where the player can attack, dodge, reflect and counterattack enemies and traps represented by the cards that were drawn. Damage taken is reflected in the player's overall health, which can be recovered normally with food or at certain shops and healers. On completing some encounters, the Dealer will present special tokens representing new cards that the player will receive at the conclusion of that dungeon, regardless of whether they won or were defeated.

If the player's character loses all of their health (i.e., by encounter or starvation) or chooses to forfeit from the in-game menu, they lose that dungeon, and the board is reset after they receive their tokens. If the player successfully beats the dungeon's boss, they progress one step forward in the story. The Dealer awaits the player for the final showdown and confrontation, so the player must pay close attention to deck-building, strategy, tactics, and chance in order to succeed.

== Development ==
Hand of Fate was first shown at the 2013 Game Developers Conference. A playable demo build was shown to the public at PAX Australia in July 2013. By this point, the game had been in development for under six months. Defiant Development are a team of approximately fifteen based in Brisbane, they described Hand of Fate as their "first big push" onto PC platforms following their previous mobile projects. Like all other Defiant games, Hand of Fate is built in Unity.

The game was part funded through a Kickstarter crowdfunding campaign. It was one of the first Australian projects to launch on Kickstarter. The campaign launched in November 2013 and concluded in December 2013, achieving its A$50,000 target. Not only was the campaign a financial success, it also allowed Defiant to build an audience and get feedback on pre-release builds. A Greenlight campaign was launched simultaneously so that the game could be released on Steam, and the game was approved in January 2014.

A week following the crowdfunding campaign, an alpha build was released for Kickstarter backers. A beta version followed in February 2014, and in July, the game launched for Windows, OS X, and Linux on Steam Early Access. The full version was released for Windows, OS X, Linux, PlayStation 4 and Xbox One on 17 February 2015.

Hand of Fate represents Defiant's first major success. The studio had been founded in 2010 in Brisbane, Australia, and initially had developed in the mobile game arena with titles like Ski Safari and Rocket Bunnies. Following Hand of Fate 2, Defiant had begun development of a next game, The World In My Attic (a working title). The game had featured a family that discovered a board game, Hexes & Heroes, that provided a gateway to a fantasy world based on the game. Players, controlling the family members would place hexagonal tiles on an ever-changing board and then become involved in an action-adventure-style game within that tile, similar in nature to progression in Hand of Fate. However, on July 23, 2019, Defiant announced they were shutting down, citing the inability for the studio to adapt to "changes both big and small", but will retain a small staff to maintain support for the Hand of Fate titles.

=== Board game ===
Defiant worked with the board game development company Rule & Make to transition the video game into a deck-building game called Hand of Fate: Ordeals. The board game allows for one to four players to cooperatively work together to process through quests in a similar manner as the video game. They sought about $22,000 in crowd-funding for publication via a Kickstarter campaign in May 2017; the campaign surpassed its goal within a day, and ended with more than $360,000 pledged.

== Release ==
In July 2016, Defiant partnered with IndieBox to produce an exclusive, custom-designed, physical release of Hand of Fate. This individually-numbered collector's box included a themed USB drive with DRM-free copy of the game, official soundtrack, instruction manual, Steam key, and several custom-made collectibles.

== Reception ==
Reception

Aggregate score
Aggregator	Score
Metacritic	PC: 78/100; PS4: 79/100; XONE: 80/100

Review scores
Publication	Score
Game Informer	8.75/10
GameRevolution	4.5/5
GameSpot	7/10
IGN	7/10
PC Gamer (US)	73/100

Hand of Fate received positive reviews. Aggregating review website Metacritic gave the Microsoft Windows version 78/100 based on 28 reviews, the Xbox One version 80/100 based on 11 reviews, and the PlayStation 4 version 79/100 based on 15 reviews.

The game sold about 400,000 copies across personal computers and consoles, and it was downloaded more than 1.5 million times as part of a free game promotion for Xbox Live.

== Sequel ==
A sequel, Hand of Fate 2, had been announced with a planned early 2017 release, but was eventually first released on November 7, 2017 for personal computers and PlayStation 4, with an Xbox One version to release shortly afterwards. The sequel adds more challenges that the player must meet to proceed in dungeons, stronger monsters to face in battle, and companions that can be gained during the adventure which assist the player in combat. Hand of Fate 2 will also release on the Nintendo Switch on July 17, 2018. The game received positive reviews from critics. The sequel outperformed the original in sales when comparing revenue each game brought in during its first half-year on sale.
