= Rusty's Retirement =

2024 video game

- Developer: Mister Morris Games
- Engine: Unity
- Platforms: Windows, Mac
- Release: WW: 26 April 2024
- Genre: Idle
- Mode: Single-player

Rusty's Retirement is a 2024 video game by independent developer Mister Morris Games. The game is an idle farming sim in which players assist a robot named Rusty to harvest crops and make upgrades on a farm. The game's user interface is presented as an overlay on the player's desktop, allowing them to undertake other tasks on their computer whilst the game progresses. Upon release, the game received generally favorable reviews, with critics praising the game's addictive nature, passive gameplay design and integration on the desktop. Following release, the game experienced commercial success, selling over half a million copies on Steam.

== Gameplay ==
Rusty's Retirement sits at the bottom of the player's desktop.

Rusty's Retirement is an idle farming sim in which players help Rusty and their workers cultivate crops on a farm. The user interface of the game sits as a narrow horizontal bar overlaid on the player's desktop. The game features limited input from the player, including to give Rusty orders to plant or clear crops, with the sale and management of the farm automated by Rusty and their workers. Starting with a small patch of land, players harvest and sell crops to purchase upgrades that allow them to automate aspects of production and unlock new types of crops and animals. Crops can also be converted to biofuel, which in turn can be converted to spare parts, enabling Rusty to construct buildings to allow other robotic workers to enter the farm, or decorations for the farm. Different workers provide the player with different abilities, including robots that construct new buildings, show statistics of the farm's production, or provide upgrades for other robots. Players can unlock new terrain for the farm, including swamps, deserts, and forests, with their own modifiers for crop production.

== Development and release ==
Rusty's Retirement was developed by Mister Morris Games, the outlet of independent developer Jordan Morris. Morris stated the game was influenced by life sim Stardew Valley and the incremental game Microcivilization, with the latter's user interface similarly presented as a thin strip on the screen. Morris developed the game using Unity. Rusty's Retirement was released on 26 April 2024.

== Reception ==
Reception

Aggregate score
Aggregator	Score
Metacritic	81%

Review scores
Publication	Score
TouchArcade	4/5
Gamereactor	8/10
Siliconera	8/10

Rusty's Retirement received "generally favorable" reviews, according to review aggregator Metacritic. According to Morris, the game was a commercial success, selling over 100,000 copies within its first week of release and a total of 550,000 by July 2025. Morris stated that the game's commercial success had allowed them to continue making games and showcase Rusty's Retirement at the Tokyo Game Show and Gamescom. GamesRadar stated that the game provided a "genre renaissance" to the idle game genre, stating that its success prompted an idle-themed Steam Next Fest in 2025, of which the game was a major representative. PC Gamer stated that the passive design of the game set it apart from other life sim games, praising its slow pace and relaxing qualities. Similarly, Rock Paper Shotgun found the game's desktop overlay made the game addictive, as it allowed players to multitask with other activities on their computer.
