= Arco (video game) =

2024 video game

- Cover art
- Publisher: Panic Inc.
- Programmers: Max Cahill, Antonio "Fayer" Uribe
- Artist: Franek Nowotniak
- Writer: Antonio "Fayer" Uribe
- Composer: José Ramón "Bibiki" García
- Engine: Löve
- Platforms: Windows; macOS; Nintendo Switch
- Release: 15 August 2024
- Genres: Turn-based tactics, Tactical role-playing game
- Mode: Single-player

Arco is a 2024 Western-themed turn‐based strategy RPG. It was made by an international team including Polish pixel artist Franek Nowotniak, Australian game developer Max Cahill, Spanish composer and sound designer José Ramón "Bibiki" García, and Mexican developer Antonio "Fayer" Uribe, and published by Panic Inc.

The game was released on 15 August 2024 for Windows, Mac, and Nintendo Switch, and was praised by critics for its art style, combat system, story, and setting.

== Gameplay ==
Set in a fantasy alternative version of frontier era North America, the story revolves around four native protagonists who each pursue separate vendettas against the Red Company. Over the course of the game players play three different stories, which come together for the game's final act. The player starts as Teco, a young child, and after an introductory period, picks up as the same character later in life, now going by the name Tizo.

The game takes inspiration from various Mesoamerican and Indigenous South American cultures, and takes place during the Spanish colonization of the Americas.

As well as a side scrolling adventure interface, the game employs a battle system where the player is shown the intent of their enemy, enters commands to move or attack, which are then carried out simultaneously with enemy actions. This allows the player characters to evade bullets and other attacks while landing their own blows. The player must spend resources called "magia" on their actions in combat, which they can regain primarily through movement actions or by standing still. This encourages players to continue moving and repositioning around the combat arena. Combat arenas also sometimes include interactive elements, such as a plant that launches damaging needles when hit with an attack.

Over the course of the game characters gain experience points, which can be spent in skill trees to upgrade and unlock new abilities.

Arco has a 'guilt' system, which increases and decreases based on the player's choices in the narrative. Characters with high rates of guilt cause ghosts to spawn during combat – these ghosts move in real time, outside of the otherwise turn-based combat system, pressuring the player to make decisions more quickly and without spending too long deciding which actions to take.

== Reception ==
Reception

Aggregate scores
Aggregator	Score
Metacritic	86/100
OpenCritic	93% recommend

Review scores
Publication	Score
Eurogamer	4/5 stars
Game Informer	9/10
RPGFan	85

Reviewing the February 2024 demo as part of Steam Next Fest, GamesRadar+ highlighted Arco as "one of the early standouts", praising its art style, engaging combat, and interactivity, and Eurogamer highlighted it as a great example of a turn-based game. In a June 2024 preview, IGN commended Arco's creative setting, combat encounter variety, and exploration system.

Combat received positive reception from critics, with particular praise given to the back-and-forth nature of moving to avoid incoming damage, while lining up attacks to deal damage in return. Rock Paper Shotgun noted that while the game employs many elements of bullet hell games, it does so in a way that doesn't feel overwhelming. PC Gamer described the combat as deceptively simple, with an innovative system and wide array of options, especially later in the game.

The world and story of Arco were highlighted in particular, with Eurogamer calling this the component that "marks out the truly thoughtful work of art". Critics commented positively on the ability for players to explore the world and interact with elements in ways that reward their creativity. IGN noted that it was positive to see media which focused on the point of view of native cultures during a time of settler colonialism, rather than the colonisers. The game's art style was praised, with GamesRadar+ describing it as bringing "color and character" to the world.

Arco did not initially sell as well as anticipated. Shortly after release, the game's developers stated that the game's poor sales would lead the developers to focus more on creating a game that will sell well, rather than making the games they otherwise want to. As a result of the positive reviews and word of mouth, the game's sales increased over the following month.
