= Luck Be a Landlord =

- Luck Be a Landlord's cover art on Steam
- Developer: TrampolineTales
- Publisher: TrampolineTales
- Designer: Dan DiIorio
- Composer: Vincent Colavita
- Engine: Godot
- Platforms: Linux; macOS; Windows; Android; iOS; Nintendo Switch; PlayStation 4; PlayStation 5; Xbox One; Xbox Series X/S
- Release: PCs; WW: January 6, 2023; Mobile; WW: July 21, 2023; Console; WW: February 6, 2025
- Genre: Roguelike deck-building
- Mode: Single-player

Luck Be a Landlord is a roguelike deck-building video game developed and published by TrampolineTales in which players attempt to pay their rent by using a customizable slot machine.

== Gameplay ==
Up to twenty symbols can be displayed on the slot machine at a time. Items are displayed on either side of the slot machine display.

Players attempt to pay their landlord using a slot machine. The mechanics are similar to roguelike deck-building games. Players must accumulate increasing amounts of money to pay their rent within a limited number of spins. After each spin, players can add another symbol. Symbols can interact with each other for extra money, such as cats drinking milk and bees pollinating flowers. Some symbols can also destroy unwanted ones. Players win by successfully paying 12 rounds of rent, thereby defeating their landlord.

== Development ==
Dan DiIorio developed Luck Be a Landlord after being inspired by Slay the Spire and freeware for Windows 98. He described himself as a "recently radicalized leftist" and, after moving into a new apartment, had been pondering why rent was necessary. The concept came from wanting to make a slot machine game that did not depend on predatory microtransations. It entered early access in January 2021. At the time, DiIorio had difficulty buying medication and had to delay development. This changed when Luck Be a Landlord suddenly became popular among streamers. It was released for Linux, macOS, and Windows on January 6, 2023. Ports to iOS and Android followed on July 21, 2023. The console versions for Nintendo Switch, PlayStation 4, PlayStation 5, Xbox One and Xbox Series X/S were released on February 6, 2025.

== Reception ==
Rock Paper Shotgun said it is a "compulsive celebration of silliness, and a successful parody" of capitalism. Commenting on the mix of genres, Eurogamer called it "a surprisingly compelling mix" and TouchArcade said it is a perfect blend of deck-building and gambling despite initially seemingly like it might be a momentary distraction. Pocket Gamer said it is "simple on the surface but full of depth" and "insanely addicting". In a more mixed review, Push Square praised the game's unique premise but criticized its design as "inflexible" and didn't enjoy the lack of roguelike momentum.

The game was banned in thirteen countries on Google Play for violating its policies on simulated gambling. DiIorio disputes the claim's inconsistency by comparing Luck Be a Landlord with similar microtransaction-based video games that are nonetheless available in those countries.

== See also ==
- CloverPit (2025) - A roguelite indie game where the player operates and exploits a slot machine
- Balatro (2024) - An indie roguelike poker deck-building game that was inspired by Luck Be A Landlord.
