= Defiant Development =

Australian video game developer

Defiant Development Pty Ltd
- Type: Private
- Industry: Video games
- Founded: 21 May 2010; 16 years ago
- Founders: Morgan Jaffit; Dan Treble
- Headquarters: Brisbane, Australia
- Key people: Morgan Jaffit (creative director); Dan Treble (technical director)
- Products: Hand of Fate
- Number of employees: 25 (2018)
- Website: defiantdev.com

Defiant Development Pty Ltd is an Australian video game publisher and former developer based in Brisbane. It was formed in May 2010 by Morgan Jaffit and Dan Treble, formerly of Pandemic Studios, in the aftermath of the closures of several larger video game studios in the country. Defiant primarily developed mobile games until 2013, when it moved to larger projects with Hand of Fate. The game was released in 2015 following a successful Kickstarter campaign and an early access phase, and it was followed by a sequel, Hand of Fate 2, in 2017. Defiant avoided "crunch", and Jaffit was outspoken about his opposition to the practice, as well as his support for a trade union. In July 2019, the studio ceased game development due to what Jaffit called a "risky" business model and a failure to adapt to changing market conditions. It thereby cancelled The World in My Attic but planned to further support its existing games.

== History ==
=== Background and early years (2009–2012) ===
Defiant Development was founded by Morgan Jaffit and Dan Treble following the closures of several larger video game developers in Australia. Jaffit had been the lead designer at the Brisbane office of Pandemic Studios, while Treble, after leaving Pandemic Studios, had worked for Krome Studios. By the late 2000s, operating such studios had become comparatively expensive in the country, given a historically high value of the Australian dollar and tax breaks for video game studios in other countries. Pandemic Studios, previously acquired by Electronic Arts, was shut down in 2009, and Krome Studios closed in 2010, as did several other developers around the same time. These closures coincided with a rise of indie and mobile game development in Australia, which Jaffit saw as an opportunity for a new studio. He joined with Treble, and they established Defiant on 21 May 2010.

The studio's first game was Rocket Bunnies, a mobile game released later in 2010. Throughout 2011, the company developed three augmented reality games: The first, Inch High Stunt Guy, was created for Qualcomm's "Augmented Reality Developer Challenge", finishing second and winning A$50,000. The company also created Floodlines and Hoops AR (previously known as Bankshot). In April 2012, Defiant published Ski Safari, an "endless skier" game developed by Brendan Watts and Shawn Eustace. The company then released Heroes Call (previously called Quick Quest), a free-to-play dungeon crawl game for iOS, in May that year. According to Jaffit, Defiant self-published its games to avoid becoming dependent on a publisher for funds, with the added pressure of repaying the publisher's investment after a game's release. However, for the release of Heroes Call, the studio invested its entire budget into polishing the game, forcing it to shift to work-for-hire jobs shortly thereafter.

=== Expansion and cessation of development (2013–2025) ===
In June 2013, Defiant was assured A$650,000 of a A$6 million governmental grant from Screen Australia for independent Australian game developers, which was to be paid out over the following three years. The investment allowed the studio to continuously grow, going from 7 to 18 full-time equivalents between 2013 and 2015. However, Jaffit later stated that the grant was as much as the company had to pay in taxes in 2016 alone. Later in 2013, Defiant developed Ben 10 Slammers, a digital collectible card game based on the Ben 10 TV series, in conjunction with Cartoon Network. The studio continued to collaborate with Cartoon Network and released Ski Safari: Adventure Time, a rework of Ski Safari based on the Adventure Time TV series, at the end of the year. Defiant created the mobile virtual reality game Atop the Wizard's Tower as part of the 2015 "Mobile VR Jam" competition held for the Oculus Rift, where it was ranked third.

In late 2013, Defiant launched a crowdfunding campaign via Kickstarter for Hand of Fate, a game that combines elements of action role-playing games with a deck-building game. After reaching its funding goal, the game became available through Steam Early Access before being released in February 2015. Defiant continued its tradition of self-publishing and raised its headcount to 15 people, of which 40% were veteran developers, 40% intermediates, and 20% juniors. It was the studio's first non-mobile game. Jaffit considered it a "big, original Australian game" and believed that this transition made Defiant "a real studio making real games". The company subsequently released a sequel, Hand of Fate 2, in November 2017. In its first six months, Hand of Fate 2 outperformed its predecessor by 40% in revenue, the highest-ever revenue in such a timeframe for Defiant. The studio employed 25 people by October 2018.

Following Hand of Fate 2, Defiant began developing a game under the working title The World in My Attic, aiming to release it in 2021. The game would have featured a family that discovers a board game, Hexes & Heroes, that provides a gateway to a fantasy world based on that game. Players, controlling the family members, would place hexagonal tiles on a changing game board and then become involved in an action-adventure game within that tile, similar to the progression in Hand of Fate. However, Jaffit announced on 23 July 2019 that Defiant would cease game development and enter "caretaker mode" to further support its existing titles. He cited the studio's "risky" business model and failure to adapt quickly enough to a games market that had "changed in ways both big and small". In March 2025, Defiant was announced as the publisher for Hordes of Fate, which was developed by former Defiant employees at Spitfire Interactive.

== Culture ==
Jaffit was opposed to the practice of overtime "crunch" labour: "I think most people running companies are scumbags. We try to be less scum-baggy." He partially attributed this to the on-average older age of Defiant's employees: He had two children of his own and therefore found it unreasonable not to let employees go home to see their children. He further claimed that Defiant's management avoided crunch because it believed that it did not own its employees and considered crunch to be counter-productive. In 2018, Jaffit said that he would support trade unions in the video game industry, including one for the company.

Starting with Defiant's fifth anniversary in May 2015, Jaffit gifted a sword to every studio member employed for at least two years.

== Accolades ==
Defiant won the "Studio of the Year" award at the 2014 Australian Game Developer Awards and was a finalist in the same category in 2016.

== Games ==
- Rocket Bunnies (2010)
- Inch High Stunt Guy (2011)
- Floodlines (2011)
- Hoops AR (2011)
- Ski Safari (2012)
- Heroes Call (2012)
- Ben 10 Slammers (2013)
- Ski Safari: Adventure Time (2013)
- Hand of Fate (2015)
- Atop the Wizard's Tower (2015)
- Hand of Fate 2 (2017)

=== Unreleased ===
- Warco (developed in conjunction with ManiatyMedia and Arenamedia)
- The World in My Attic (formerly scheduled for 2021)
