= Hand of Fate 2 =

2017 video game

- Developer: Defiant Development
- Publisher: Defiant Development
- Engine: Unity
- Platforms: Linux; macOS; PlayStation 4; Windows; Xbox One; Nintendo Switch
- Release: Lin, Mac, Win, PS4; WW: November 7, 2017; Xbox One; WW: December 1, 2017; Switch; WW: July 17, 2018
- Genres: Action role-playing, deck-building
- Mode: Single-player

Hand of Fate 2 is a 2017 video game developed and published by Defiant Development. It combines action role-playing games with deck-building video games. It is the sequel to Hand of Fate.

== Gameplay ==
Players progress through an overworld consisting of twenty-two levels, each of which has different goals. Each level must be cleared by facing challenges posed by cards dealt by the Dealer, a mysterious antagonist. Players also have their own deck of cards, as in deck-building games. Players can augment their decks with recruited companions, each of whom has their own story and associated quests. When cards indicate combat, players engage in third-person action sequences, as in action role-playing games. If players die, they must start the level over from the beginning.

== Development ==
Defiant Development released it for Linux, macOS, Windows, and PlayStation 4 on November 7, 2017; for Xbox One on December 1, 2017; and for Switch on July 17, 2018.

== Reception ==
Hand of Fate 2 received positive reviews on Metacritic. Although PC Gamer felt the combat was weak and repetitive, they said the strategic elements and storytelling make up for it. IGN called it a major improvement over Hand of Fate and praised the added depth, though they said it can still be repetitive. GameSpot said it is "a realization of the first game's promise" and praised the combination of genres. However, they said some quests rely too much on luck, and dying during a quest can be frustrating. Game Informer said the combat is "often boring or laborious", but they called the gameplay otherwise "fantastic and unique". Rock Paper Shotgun said it has more variety than Hand of Fate, but they said they missed that game's larger role for the Dealer.
