= Slay the Spire =

2019 roguelike deck-building game

- Developer: Mega Crit
- Publishers: Mega Crit (PC); Humble Bundle (other)
- Designers: Anthony Giovannetti; Casey Yano
- Artist: Anailis Dorta
- Composer: Clark Aboud
- Engine: libGDX
- Platforms: Windows; macOS; Linux; Nintendo Switch; PlayStation 4; Xbox One; iOS; Android
- Release: January 23, 2019: Windows, macOS, Linux; January 23, 2019; PlayStation 4; May 21, 2019; Nintendo Switch; June 6, 2019; Xbox One; August 14, 2019; iOS; June 13, 2020; Android; February 3, 2021
- Genre: Roguelike deck-building
- Mode: Single-player

Slay the Spire is a 2019 roguelike deck-building game developed by the indie studio Mega Crit. It was published by Mega Crit for its initial PC release and by Humble Bundle for home consoles and mobile platforms. The game was released in early access for Microsoft Windows, macOS, and Linux in late 2017, with an official release in January 2019. It was released for PlayStation 4 in May 2019, for Nintendo Switch in June 2019 and for Xbox One in August 2019. An iOS version was released in June 2020, with an Android version released in February 2021.

In Slay the Spire, the player attempts to ascend a spire of multiple floors created through procedural generation as one of four characters, battling enemies and bosses. Combat takes place through a collectible card game-based system, with the player gaining new cards as rewards from combat and other means, requiring the player to employ deck-building strategies to construct an effective deck to complete the climb.

Slay the Spire has been very well received, becoming nominated for multiple awards in 2019 and 2020. It is considered the video game that popularized a trend of roguelike deck-building video games. A sequel, Slay the Spire II, was released in early access in March 2026.

== Gameplay ==
Slay the Spire is a roguelike deck-building game. At the start of a playthrough, the player selects one out of four characters (Note: The fourth character was added after a January 2020 update.). Each character starts with different health amounts, a unique starting relic with a special ability, gold, and a starter deck. Players will obtain other cards (typically from a pool specific to that character) and relics throughout the run.

The goal is to work through several floors of the spire, each level having a number of potential encounters distributed in a branching structure with a boss character at the end of the level. Encounters include monsters which vary in strength; elite enemies which offer enhanced rewards; campfires to heal or upgrade cards; shopkeepers to buy cards, relics and potions from, as well as to remove cards from the deck; chests with random loot; and random choice-based encounters.

Gameplay in Slay the Spire involves playing cards for attacks and defenses against known attacks from enemies.

Combat is played in turns. Each turn the player receives a fresh hand of cards and three energy points. The player can play any combination of cards as long as they have the energy to pay for the energy cost of each card, and at the end of the turn, all cards not played are sent to a discard pile. Players' cards vary by character but generally consist of attack cards to damage opponents, skill cards that buff themselves, debuff opponents, or add to their blocking power for the turn, and power cards where the effect remains in play until the end of combat. Each opponent on the field will telegraph what move they will make: if they will attack and with how much damage, if they will block, cast a spell to buff themselves or debuff the player. In some cases, the opponents' attack or the player cards may add unplayable cards representing battle conditions like Wounds and Curses to the player's deck that can dilute a player's hand and may add negative effects while in the player's hand. The player can determine the best strategy to avoid taking any damage after they complete their turn. If the player's health drops to zero, the game is over and they must restart from the bottom of the spire. Otherwise, if the player defeats all the monsters in an encounter, they typically receive gold and a choice of one of three randomly-selected cards to add to their deck, if desired. Other loot that can be obtained from monsters or other encounters include relics that provide a permanent character buff for the duration of the game, such as increased maximum health, additional energy points, lower casting costs, and automatic blocking, and single-use potions that can be used during any turn for no cost to restore health, buff the player, and debuff or damage the enemy.

The deck-building game requires players to develop a strategy for their deck on the fly based on the cards they can obtain from loot and in synergy with the relics they obtain. Like other deck-builders, too many weak cards or the unplayable cards dilute the player's deck, and the player must strategically decide which cards are the best fit to make the deck effective, when to turn down additions of cards, or when to spend money to remove cards so as to maximize the deck's strength.

Slay the Spire features elements of metaprogression. Completed or failed runs contribute points towards unlocking new characters or new relics and cards that will be made available for the specific character. Up to 20 Ascension difficulty levels unlock with each successfully completed run, each adding a cumulative negative effect such as lower health or stronger enemy attacks. In addition to the standard 3 acts of the game, an optional Act IV can be accessed by collecting three special keys throughout the spire. In Act IV, the player encounters the true final boss of the game, the Heart of the Spire.

Achievements provide several challenges to the player such as to climb the tower with a character using only their starting relic or with only common cards in their decks. A daily challenge gives players a single chance to get as high in the spire as they can under pre-set conditions and a fixed random seed, so that each player is starting from the same point and sees the same encounters. The custom mode allows players to start runs with custom modifiers that can increase or decrease the difficulty of the game.

== Development ==
Slay the Spire is developed by Seattle-based studio Mega Crit, with Anthony Giovannetti and Casey Yano as lead developers. Their initial goal was to fuse the concept of a roguelike game with deck-building games like Dominion. The game was also inspired partially by the Netrunner collectible card game, of which Giovannetti was a fan, and for which he maintains a community website. The game was built on the libGDX framework. It was originally chosen because its Java runtime allowed it to run on Windows, macOS, and Linux, but Yano later expressed frustration with it frequently being broken by operating system updates and its lack of console support.

To help test and get feedback on the game, Giovannetti turned to expert players in the Netrunner community. This was also necessary to determine appropriate balance for the cards they added, as balancing the difficulty of the game against the randomness of the roguelike encounters and the card-based play was difficult. By using a large number of playtesters, along with gameplay metric reporting from the game client, they were able to determine what cards had positive designs and which cards to remove. For example, they became aware of cards with too low a value for the game when they were not picked by players when offered, and found cards that were overpowered if they occurred too frequently within game-winning decks. They had no issue when players discovered card synergies that created powerful combinations, a factor of concern in typical collectible card games, as it was a single-player game and there would be no opponent that would feel overwhelmed by these combos.

Originally, enemies did not show their next intended action as is common to most turn-based role-playing video games, but this design did not mesh well with the roguelike nature of permadeath. During playtests, they found that players were confused about the number of card abilities without any clear situation to apply them. They first created a "Next Turn" system where the player could select individual targets to see what their chosen action would be in part of the game's user interface. The "Next Turn" system brought something unique to the game, according to Giovannetti, and enabled them to create new buffs and debuffs that were easy to describe to players through the interface. However, from a user-interface perspective, there were still issues particularly when multiple enemies were present. They then transitioned from the "Next Turn" to the new "Intents" system, which used icons to represent the enemy's next move, though originally this lacked exact numbers for attack values, instead representing certain ranges of attacks by different weapons. Giovannetti felt they didn't want to present too many numbers to players to overwhelm them and make the game off-putting, but they discovered through playtesters that having the numbers available was more engaging, did not require the player to have to memorize what each symbol meant, and enabled players to create new strategies. The approach for players to progress through the spires with branching pathways and random events was inspired by FTL: Faster Than Light.

Upon its early access initial release in November 2017, the game featured two playable characters with plans for at least a third to be added during the early access period. Giovannetti said that while they could add more cards for a character's card pool, they found having about 75 different cards available was the right balance to give some potential strategy to the player; having too many card types would make deck construction during runs much more haphazard, an issue that Netrunner had faced. Charlie Hall of Polygon found that, in contrast to most other early access titles, the game's mechanics and core gameplay were already well-developed at the start and found that the sustained weekly updates made the game more attractive to potential buyers. Giovannetti credits indirect feedback from watching online streamers play the game during early access to help improve its balance, as he said "A streamer isn't going to be afraid to speak their minds or insult you – they probably don't even know you're there most of the time."

Other changes over the course of early access development included adding more potions with novel effects, and adding more events to the game. On Steam, the game also supports user-created modifications through the Steam Workshop, allowing users to create new playable characters, cards, monsters, and other items. The early access period ended on January 23, 2019, with the full release of the game. An official fourth playable character was added to the game as part of a free content update, first released to Windows versions on January 14, 2020.

Humble Bundle helped to provide publication support for Mega Crit for the non-PC releases, first for home consoles: Slay the Spire was released for the PlayStation 4 on May 21, 2019, for the Nintendo Switch on June 6, 2019, and for the Xbox One on August 14, 2019. Mobile versions of the game for iOS and Android were planned for release in 2019, but in December 2019, Mega Crit pushed their release into early 2020. The iOS version was released in June 2020, and had feature-parity with the computer and console releases. The Android version was released on February 3, 2021. Humble Bundle's publishing division was shut down in July 2024, resulting in Mega Crit being unable to offer further updates or support for those releases.

== Reception ==
Reception

Aggregate scores
Aggregator	Score
Metacritic	PC: 89/100; PS4: 88/100; NS: 85/100 iOS: 83/100
OpenCritic	98% recommend

Review scores
Publication	Score
IGN	9/10
PC Gamer (US)	92%
TouchArcade	4/5

According to Mega Crit, the game's first early access release in November 2017 was very slow, with about 2000 copies selling across the first weeks, the period in which most games sell the most copies. While they had seeded redemption keys with streamers and influencers, these had not converted into sales. It was not until a Chinese streamer featured the game on their channel that had over a million views that Mega Crit started to see a large rise in sales. During the week ending January 21, 2018, Slay the Spire was the second highest-sold game on Steam. By February 2018, the game had more than 500,000 players, according to SteamSpy estimates. Mega Crit announced that by the end of June, sales of Slay the Spire had exceeded 1 million, and reached 1.5 million by March 2019.

On release, the game received positive reviews, with a Metacritic aggregate rating of 89 out of 100. OpenCritic determined that 98% of critics recommended the game.

=== Awards ===
Year	Award	Category	Result	Ref.
2019	2019 Golden Joystick Awards	Best Indie Game	Nominated	
2019	2019 Golden Joystick Awards	PC Game of the Year	Nominated	
2019	The Game Awards 2019	Fresh Indie Game (Mega Crit)	Nominated	
2019	Steam Awards	Most Innovative Gameplay	Nominated	
2020	23rd Annual D.I.C.E. Awards	Strategy/Simulation Game of the Year	Nominated	
2020	23rd Annual D.I.C.E. Awards	Outstanding Achievement in Game Design	Nominated	
2020	NAVGTR Awards	Engineering	Nominated	
2020	Independent Games Festival Awards	Seumas McNally Grand Prize	Nominated	
2020	Independent Games Festival Awards	Excellence in Design	Nominated	
2020	18th Annual G.A.N.G. Awards	Best Music for an Indie Game	Nominated	

IGN named Slay the Spire as the Best Strategy Game of 2019, while PC Gamer gave it the Best Design for 2019. IGN later ranked it as one of the best 25 PC Games from the past decade, and one of the top 10 roguelike games.

== Board game adaptation ==
Mega Crit announced in January 2021 that they were creating a cooperative board game adaptation of Slay the Spire with Contention Games. The game features more than 730 cards total, with four possible player characters to choose from. A notable difference from the video game is that the game can be played co-operatively with up to four players. A crowdfunding campaign for the board game was launched on November 2, 2022, and reached its funding goal after just 6 minutes. The campaign reached US$1.4 (equivalent to $1.5 in 2025) million in its first day, and finished after raising nearly US$4 (equivalent to $4.4 in 2025) million total. CBR included it on their list of most anticipated tabletop games of 2023.

A crowdfunding campaign for a reprint of the original board game, plus an expansion pack titled Downfall, was announced in September 2025. The expansion pack is based on a popular mod for the PC version of Slay the Spire likewise titled Downfall, which features the game's bosses as playable characters, defending the Spire from the heroes.

== Sequel ==
Mega Crit announced in April 2024 that a sequel, Slay the Spire II, was planned to be released in early access in 2025. The game will see returning characters the Ironclad, the Silent, and the Defect, and at least two new characters, the Necrobinder and the Regent. The sequel also introduces cooperative play for up to four players. Mega Crit stated that they were inspired to make the sequel due to the amount of fan support they received for the first game, and plan to release the sequel into early access to work along with fans to finalize the game. As a result of the changes with the Unity engine licensing, Slay the Spire II is being developed in the Godot engine. Mega Crit delayed the release in September 2025, later confirming that early access would begin on March 5, 2026.
