= Roguelike deck-building game =

Video game subgenre

A roguelike deck-building game or roguelike deckbuilder is a hybrid genre of video games that combines the nature of deck-building card games with procedurally generated randomness from roguelike games.

== Gameplay aspects ==
Most roguelike deck-building games present the player with one or more pre-established deck of cards that are used within the game, typically in turn-based combat. As the player progresses through the game, they gain the ability to add cards to this deck, most often through either a choice of one or more random reward cards, or sometimes through an in-game shop. There also may be a mechanism to remove cards from the deck, or to update a card already in the deck. Because the player cannot predict which cards will be presented as rewards, they must build their deck "on the fly", trying to develop potential combinations and synergies between cards and other gameplay elements, while at the same time avoid diluting their deck with cards that do not work as well. For example, the player in Slay the Spire can gain relics that provide permanent effects for the character as rewards from defeating powerful enemies, and the deck-building strategy subsequently will be tied to synergizing the effects of cards with the power of these relics. This approach to building out the deck is comparable to developing a character in a tabletop role-playing game, thus adding some depth to the game. Some games in this genre do allow players to edit decks directly, in manners similar to collectible card games, but still use randomization for how the cards play out within the game.

The "card" metaphor is used most commonly, but other randomized elements may be used. In Dicey Dungeons, the player fights through monsters in dungeons by acquiring randomized weapons and equipment as prizes from combat; these are powered in combat by using the results of dice rolls to match values on the equipment. In Luck Be a Landlord, the player acquires symbols that are placed on a slot machine, and scores points by achieving synergies with how the symbols may randomly land on the slot display that score larger point values.

Many games in this genre use turn-based combat, similar to console role-playing games. On the player's turn, they are drawn a hand of cards, and may play one or more cards, frequently based on limited amount of "mana" or "action cost" used in other collectible cards games. Card effects can range from simple damage, defense or healing to complicated effects that may linger for several turns, similar to real-life collectible card games. Enemies typically follow more straightforward combat, attacking, defending, or applying buffs and debuffs to themselves or the player. Many games in this genre utilize permadeath, another roguelike feature; should the player's character lose all their health, the character is dead and the player must start anew with the original starting deck for the character. Often, these games include metagame aspects, with players unlocking the potential for new cards to be obtained with each runthrough, or gaining a small bonus perk on starting a new runthrough. Such turn-based combat is not always an element: Hand of Fate and its sequel use the player's card deck for randomizing the layout of the dungeon, equipment, enemies, and rewards, but combat is played out through a real-time action game.

Encounters in these roguelike deck-building games are typically randomized, following roguelike producedural generation rules to make fair but different pathways through the game. Players are often given choices of which encounters, with more dangerous encounters offering greater rewards. There is often a final boss character and several mini-boss characters the player must fight through to successfully complete a runthrough. Because of the roguelike nature with numerous systems affected by the random nature, most roguelike deck-building games require intensive playtesting to make sure the game is properly balanced.

The randomness of cards which are available to the player force them to develop strategies on the fly as they progress further in the game. A player can improve themselves in a roguelike deckbuilder by learning from their past mistakes and finding new combinations of cards and effects that can help them succeed. A further aspect of roguelike deck-builders is balancing the size of one's deck, passing up rewards or using removal tools to keep the deck lean and its outcomes more predictable.

Within these deckbuilders, a common gameplay theme derives from Luck be a Landlord and Balatro. In these games, the player must work their way through multiple rounds where in each round they must earn a number of points, which increases each round, based on the collection that they have been building up from earlier rounds. Players tune their collection through various means to maximize the synergy to earn points as to reach the increasing score demand. For example, in Luck be a Landlord, players collect symbols that are used to randomly populate the slot machine, some that directly score points while others increase their score based on the presence of other symbols on the board. In Balatro, players work with a normal playing card deck to make the best scoring poker hands to beat ever-increasing antes, with the ability to use specialized joker cards to modify their scoring and other mechanics to shape the cards in their deck to create synergies with the jokers.

== History ==
Richard Garfield, the creator of Magic: The Gathering, identified two earlier games that set the elements for roguelike deck-building games. The 1997 Magic: the Gathering video game had the player travel across the game world, winning rounds of Magic combat to gain cards to build and improve their deck. Dominion was introduced in 2008 as the first tabletop deck-building game, itself inspired by Magic: The Gathering. Dominion inspired several tabletop card games that followed. Some of these games were digitized for play on personal computers or mobile devices, but remained faithful adaptions of the physical game.

One of the first roguelike deck-building video games was Dream Quest, a mobile game developed by Peter Whalen and released in 2014 (subsequently released for personal computers about a year later). Dream Quest, while graphically simple, incorporated the core elements of the genre. It caught the attention of Garfield. While Garfield had played more traditional deck-building games before, he stated of Dream Quest, "I became completely hooked when I realized that you really had to build a well rounded deck. Most deck building games reward you for picking a strategy and following it to the absolute exclusion of anything else." Whalen himself was inspired by Magic: The Gathering in creating Dream Quest. After Garfield's discovery of the game, he reached out to Blizzard Entertainment and encouraged them to try it, which led to Whalen being hired by Blizzard to help create their card game Hearthstone.

While other roguelike deck-building games emerged following Dream Quest such as Hand of Fate, the genre gained more attention with Slay the Spire, which was developed by Megacrit. Slay the Spire was released into early access for Microsoft Windows computers in November 2017, and had its full release in January 2019, eventually expanding to release on several consoles as well. The developers of the game had wanted to make a game like Dominion, while using some of the concepts of the tabletop card game Netrunner, and had used the Netrunner community to test the game's balance before release. Despite a slow start after its early access, interest in the game quickly built from online streamers and videos of the game, and by June 2018, had over one million units sold.

By April 2024, over 850 games on Steam were tagged as roguelike deck-builders, showing significant growth in this genre. Among attributes creating popularity in the genre, as identified by Ars Technica, are its relative simplicity for developers to create through prototyping and testing of ideas and not requiring a large amount of artistic assets, a large amount of room for introduction of new gameplay and narrative genre ideas to the field, its ease of promotion through live streaming of playthroughs which often bring new players to the games, their high replayability due to the roguelike nature, the ease for players to pick up and put down the game in short periods to consider strategy, if desired, and their lower cost to play compared to traditional physical trading card games like Magic: The Gathering.

== See Also ==
- List of roguelike deck-building games
