= Black Myth =

Black Myth is a videogame series created by Game Science. Titles in the series include:

- Black Myth: Wukong
- Black Myth: Zhong Kui

== Other uses ==
- Black Myth/Out in Space, a music album by Sun Ra

== See also ==
- Black Legend of Spanish historiography
