= Game Science =

Chinese video game developer

- Type: Private
- Industry: Video games
- Founded: 13 June 2014; 12 years ago
- Founders: Feng Ji; Yang Qi
- Headquarters: Shenzhen, China
- Key people: Feng Ji (CEO)
- Products: Black Myth: Wukong
- Owner: Tencent (24%)
- Website: gamesci.cn

Game Science
- Chinese: 游戏科学
Transcriptions
Standard Mandarin
- Hanyu Pinyin: Yóuxì Kēxué

Game Science Interactive Technology Co., Ltd.
- Chinese: 游科互动科技有限公司
Transcriptions
Standard Mandarin
- Hanyu Pinyin: Yóukē Hùdòng Kējì Yǒuxiàn Gōngsī

Game Science is a Chinese video game development and publishing company founded by Feng Ji and Yang Qi in 2014. The studio is headquartered in Shenzhen and has an additional office in Hangzhou.

Game Science develops action role-playing games and operates a merchandise brand. It is best known for developing the video game Black Myth: Wukong (2024), which has expanded into the Black Myth series. During the early years, it developed mobile games.

== History ==
=== Formation and early period (2014–2017) ===
Game Science was founded on 13 June 2014. Its founders are Feng Ji and Yang Qi. Its seven founding members previously worked as developers on the massively multiplayer online game Asura at Tencent.

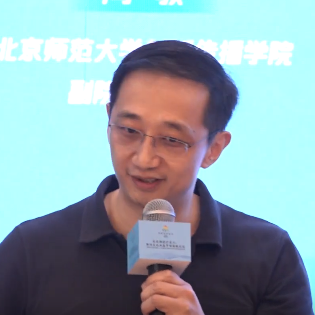
Feng Ji serves as the chief executive officer of Game Science.

At the time of Game Science's establishment, China's mobile games market was greatly expanding, so the studio pivoted toward mobile development to stay afloat. The mobile game 100 Heroes was developed by the studio and published by NetEase. It was presented during the NetEase 520 Conference in 2015. After its release, it attracted 500 thousand players in the first month and nearly 800 thousand players in the first year. Yang Qi proposed a single-player game as the studio's next project, but the idea was shelved due to the high costs and risks involved for a newly established studio. Instead, the mobile game Art of War: Red Tides was developed by the studio. In 2019, it was acquired by Chaoxi Guangnian, a ByteDance subsidiary. During these early years, Lilith Games CEO Wang Xiwen introduced Game Science CEO Feng Ji and Hero Games CEO Daniel Wu to each other. Hero Games invested in Game Science as a result of the early connection. Previously, Wang and Feng were colleagues at Tencent.

From the outset, Game Science embraced a vision of creating games that personally move and resonate with its developers—a philosophy highlighted on the studio's official website. In a 2025 speech at the Black Myth: Wukong Art Exhibition in the CAA Art Museum, Feng Ji reaffirmed this as a core value of the studio. He elaborated that projects advance most effectively when game developers, as players themselves, have a deep understanding of both the work and its audience, but underscored that developers ultimately only represent themselves and must therefore continuously experiment to find the intersection between themselves and players.

The studio's philosophy also reflects ideas expressed in Feng Ji's 2007 article Who Murdered Our Games? (谁谋杀了我们的游戏). This writing offers a critique of the industry from the perspective of a game planner, arguing that many games fail before they even leave the development stage, these failures occur when development teams lack excitement for the games they are creating, the industry has fostered a mentality where players are treated like livestock in the pursuit for engagement and profit, and the industry has a dark side characterized by capital-driven practices that alienate players and degrade their experiences. In a 2024 interview with China Central Television, Feng Ji elaborated that game developers should focus on gameplay and storytelling to captivate players, but must remain cautious of capital-driven practices that are harmful, emphasizing that a reasonable standard is whether you would recommend a game that you made to your children, relatives, and friends with peace of mind.

=== Black Myth: Wukong (2018–present) ===
After the mobile games 100 Heroes and Art of War: Red Tides, Game Science started the development of Black Myth: Wukong in 2018. According to operations director Lan Weiyi, the shift toward AAA development came after the realization that Steam had more users from China than from the United States, which indicated that China's premium games market was transforming. Before the development of the game began, the studio conducted a company-wide survey that revealed that action role-playing games had the longest playtimes on Steam among the staff, which guided both the studio's broader focus and the Black Myth project's direction toward the genre. Feng Ji said that this approach would enable everyone to better understand and empathize with players, since they themselves would be players of the types of games they were creating. The studio decided to maintain teams for both mobile and single-player games. However, as the development cycles between the two kinds of games are very different, Feng Ji and Yang Qi sought a new environment appropriate for a team that worked on single-player games. Ultimately, the Black Myth development team moved from Shenzhen to Hangzhou due to its "slower pace and lower living costs".

In August 2020, Game Science released the first trailer of Black Myth: Wukong as a way to recruit more talent for the company. At the time, the game's development team had about 30 members. Due to the trailer going viral, Game Science received over 10,000 resumes from domestic and foreign candidates. As listed in the game's credits, the team eventually grew to 140 members.

Hero Games acquired a 19% stake in Game Science through its wholly owned subsidiary Tianjin Hero Financial Holding Technology in 2017, but sold its shares in the studio in 2022 with payment partly outstanding as of 2024. As reported in 2021, Tencent obtained a 5% stake in the studio. The company aimed to help the studio on some projects, but committed to not interfering with the operation and decision-making of the studio. As reported in 2026, Tencent's registered stake in the studio rose from 5% to 24%, following the company's acquisition of Hero Games' shares in the studio as early as 2022. As a result, Tencent became the sole external investor in the studio.

In 2023, IGN released a report that alleged a history of sexism within the company, citing screenshots of personal posts by company figures in Chinese social media and suggestive hiring posters from 2015 as examples. Chinese-language outlets HK01, an online news portal, and GameLook, a game-industry research website, criticized IGN's report, arguing that the article uses examples that are taken out of context and vulgar but not sexist. HK01 and Gamebase reported that the relevant posts had been mistranslated. HK01 also reported that the criticism by anonymous commentators quoted in the article cannot be verified. Game Science declined to address questions about the allegations. On social media, Khee Hoon Chan, a co-author of the IGN article, called for online piracy and made explicit comments toward Game Science. Hero Games chairman Dino Ying commented that Game Science tries not to get into distractions.

Black Myth: Wukong was released in August 2024 and sold 20 million units in its first month. It was one of the fastest-selling games of all time.

In 2024, Game Science and the electric automobile maker BYD Company formed a strategic partnership to digitize China's national treasures and landmarks, aiming to support their protection and provide a scientific foundation for future restoration work. This involved 3D scanning in Shanxi, which was prominently featured in Black Myth: Wukong, and other provinces in China.

== Games and products ==
Game Science has made several video games.

Year	English	Chinese	Pinyin
2015	100 Heroes	百將行	Bǎi Jiāng Xíng
2016	Art of War: Red Tides	战争艺术：赤潮	Zhànzhēng Yìshù: Chìcháo
2024	Black Myth: Wukong	黑神话：悟空	Hēishénhuà: Wùkōng
TBA	Black Myth: Zhong Kui	黑神话：钟馗	Hēishénhuà: Zhōng Kuí

In January 2025, Game Science released a Chinese New Year short film announcing its official merchandise brand BLACKMYTH. The studio conceived it as a gamer lifestyle brand with products related to Black Myth: Wukong and other content. A dedicated team, separate from the game developers, was formed to handle the design, production, and operation of the brand. The brand initially built a store presence on online platforms. The first BLACKMYTH brick-and-mortar store was opened in Hangzhou in September 2025. The location serves as both a retail store and an exhibition hall. It occasionally hosts events in collaboration with other institutions, such as Cold Light Armor (寒光甲胄) and the Guizhou Nuo Culture Museum (贵州傩文化博物馆).

== See also ==
- Six Little Dragons
