= Elesky =

Spanish Twitch streamer and pianist

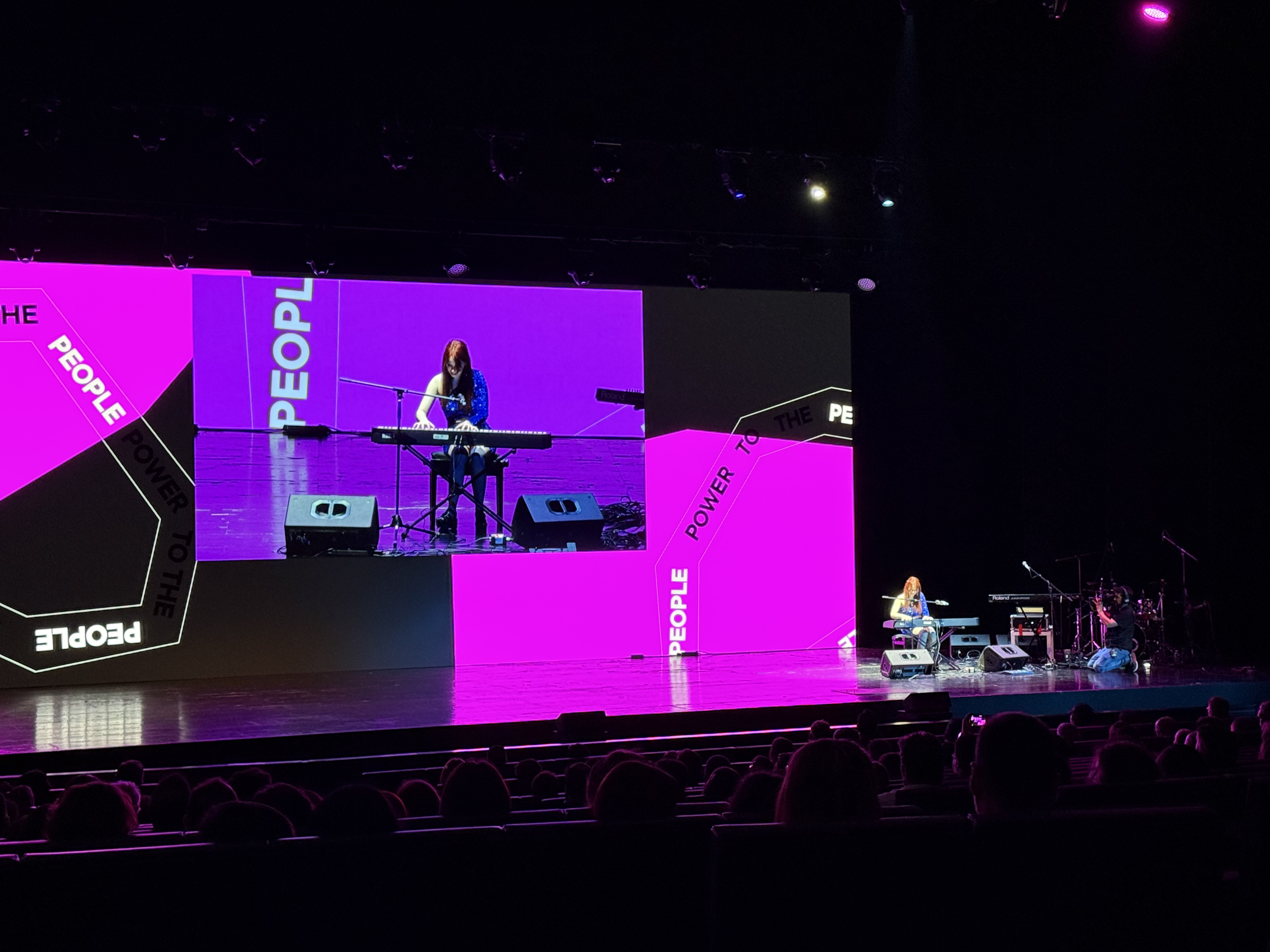
- Elesky during GEM Awards in April 2025
- Born: Elena Loredo; 1995 (age 30–31); Gijón, Asturias
- Occupations: Pianist; Composer; Twitch streamers; Video gamer

Twitch information
- Channel: Elesky
- Years active: 2017–present
- Genre: Music
- Followers: 171 thousand

YouTube information
- Channel: Elesky
- Subscribers: 28.6 thousand
- Views: 1.44 million
- Last updated: 2 July 2026

Elena Loredo (born 1995), known online as Elesky, is a Spanish pianist, composer, Twitch streamer, and video gamer.

== Early life ==
Elena Loredo was born in 1995 in Gijón, Asturias. In 2001, at the age of 5, she began playing the piano. She later learned the guitar, ukulele, melodica, and ocarina. Loredo mostly plays video game and anime soundtracks. She became known in 2017 on Twitter by playing the Digimon theme, and she also played Animal Crossing, Spyro, The Legend of Zelda: Ocarina of Time, Pokémon Ruby and Ori and the Blind Forest themes, including other Nintendo soundtracks.

Loredo decided to stream on Twitch to recreate a musical concert she could not do live. Viewers who watched it cheered her on to continue with more Twitch streaming, until NZXT asked to sponsor her.

She has sung Coco's film song. She has studied Dramatic Art and worked as a choir singer at Teatro Campoamor in Oviedo for a year. She has made concert appearances at Cometcon in Asturias, Gamepolis and Freakcon in Malaga, Retro Sevilla, and Fun & Serious Games Festival in Bilbao.

== Career ==
In 2021, Elesky signed for Giants, a group of streamers and content creators created in 2020 and formed by Cabramaravilla, LittleRagerGirl, Manute, Zeling, and Chuso Montero, among others. She then played the Spider-Man: No Way Home theme.

Elesky was invited to the 8th edition of PlayStation Talents Awards, playing a medley of video game music such as Horizon Zero Dawn, God of War, and Shadow of the Colossus, and won the Omniscona award for best musical Spanish streamer. She has collaborated with Esportmaniacos, Amazon Music, and Vodafone YU, and has worked with Nintendo, PlayStation, Bethesda, Riot Games, and Xbox.

In 2022, Elesky moved to Madrid after signing a project with PlayStation. She presented the UPA NEXT Reveal Party, where the cast was announced for the Atresmedia TV series UPA Next, alongside Cristinini, Carolina Iglesias, Beatriz Luengo, and voice actress Elisawavess.

Elesky participated in the Pokémon Creators' Cup alongside PokeRaf, a Pokémon Scarlet and Violet battle between several streamers, and she also participated in the Pokémon Twitch Cup alongside Abby. She went to TwitchCon Amsterdam alongside Rubius, Alexelcapo, and Illojuan, among others.

In 2023, Elesky made a crossover of Dale Zelda Dale, from Ganon Rosario. She played Barbie Girl and Shakira Bzrp Session in a Pokémon duel, which was the most viewed video on that days with 40,000 likes and 2.4 million views. She also made a cover of the song, as it was a final boss.

Elesky had planned a concert tour in Las Vegas on the NAB Show, but she couldn't enter the United States. The reason they gave to her was she couldn't enter because she was going to work there, and she could take the job of a native worker.

Elesky attended Gamepolis 2023 alongside Lorenzo Beteta, voice actor of Joel in The Last of Us, and went to Kokoro Japan Expo.

In 2024, Elesky became the first streamer to play the BSO of a videogame, the Spanish indie Eden Genesis, by Aeternum Game Studios, in which she played piano alongside the composer Juan Ignacio Teruel Torres.

On 26 April 2025, Elesky performed a musical concert at GEM Awards.
