= Xixian =

Xixian may refer to:

- Xi County, Henan (息县), of Xinyang, Henan
- Xi County, Shanxi (隰县), of Linfen, Shanxi
- Deng Xiaoping or Xixian (希贤; 1904–1997), Chinese paramount leader
