= Black Myth: Wukong =

2024 video game

- Developer: Game Science
- Publisher: Game Science
- Director: Feng Ji
- Producer: Feng Ji
- Designer: Jiang Baicun
- Programmer: Zhao Wenyong
- Artist: Yang Qi
- Series: Black Myth
- Engine: Unreal Engine 5
- Platforms: PlayStation 5; Windows; Xbox Series X/S
- Release: PlayStation 5, Windows; August 20, 2024; Xbox Series X/S; August 20, 2025
- Genre: Action role-playing
- Mode: Single-player

Black Myth: Wukong (Note: Simplified Chinese: 黑神话：悟空; traditional Chinese: 黑神話：悟空; pinyin: Hēishénhuà: Wùkōng.) is a 2024 action role-playing game developed and published by the Chinese studio Game Science. The player assumes the role of the Destined One, a staff-wielding monkey, who embarks on a journey to recover six relics corresponding to Sun Wukong's six senses. The game is inspired by the classical Chinese novel Journey to the West. It is the first installment in the Black Myth series.

Black Myth: Wukong was released for PlayStation 5 and Windows on August 20, 2024, and for Xbox Series X/S on August 20, 2025. It received generally favorable reviews from critics and won several accolades including Game of the Year awards. It sold 20 million units in its first month, making it one of the fastest-selling games of all time. The next installment, Black Myth: Zhong Kui, is currently in development.

== Gameplay ==
Black Myth: Wukong is an action role-playing game. It has elements characteristic of the Soulslike subgenre. It is played in single-player mode from a third-person perspective.

This gameplay demonstrates the Destined One performing a few of the possible moves corresponding to each of the staff stances. It also shows dodges, a spell (Rock Solid), and a varied combo (Resolute Strike) countering incoming attacks.

The player controls the Destined One, a monkey based on Sun Wukong from the classical Chinese novel Journey to the West. His weapon is a staff much like the Ruyi Jingu Bang from the novel. The staff can extend and shrink in size during combat. Its moveset is versatile through the staff stances, which includes the smash, pillar, and thrust stance. The combat mechanics involve resource management. Focus accumulates by landing light attacks, performing well-timed dodges, and other means. A focus point is gained whenever enough focus has built up. These points are used to initiate heavy attacks. A heavy attack is performed on its own or as a varied combo during light attacks. Meanwhile, stamina depletes by sprinting, dodging, and attacking.

Spells, which act as abilities, are divided into four categories, namely mysticism, alteration, strand, and transformations. They have cooldown periods and consume mana. The exception is transformations, which have cooldown periods and do not consume mana. Each transformation enables the player character to shapeshift into another being that has its own unique moveset and health pool. It remains active until its might, which depletes by attacking, or health runs out. One example is the Red Tides transformation, which takes the form of Guangzhi, a wolfman who wields a flaming glaive.

Spirits and vessels are equippable components that have passive bonuses and active skills. Each has its own qi, which is used to activate its skill and accumulates by landing attacks. Defeated yaoguai chiefs may leave behind their spirits, which are captured if they are absorbed into a gourd or retrieved from a keeper's shrine. Each spirit skill enables the protagonist to shapeshift into another being to unleash a unique attack. An example of a spirit is the Wandering Wight, who performs a headbutt attack. An example of a vessel is the Plantain Fan, which generates a hurricane that staggers enemies.

The game follows a mostly linear progression interspersed with expansive areas. Keeper's shrines serve as checkpoints along the way. The character customization is flexible, as skill points known as sparks can be freely reallocated to change the character's playstyle. The game's difficulty cannot be manually adjusted and varies throughout a playthrough. Enemy boss encounters, for instance, follow a deliberate rhythm of rising and falling intensity across each chapter. A New Game Plus mode and a boss battle mode become available following the completion of a playthrough.

== Synopsis ==
=== Setting ===
Black Myth: Wukong is inspired by the classical Chinese novel Journey to the West. For instance, it features adaptations of the novel's characters and their backstories. It is structured into six chapters, each centered on a distinct location: Black Wind Mountain, Yellow Wind Ridge, The New West, The Webbed Ridge, Flaming Mountains, and Mount Huaguo. The world is home to gods from the Chinese pantheon, encompassing Buddhist, Daoist, and other deities. It is also inhabited by yaoguais, who are beings with preternatural abilities and strange appearances. The story hints at a growing instability in the relationship between the Buddhist deities of Mount Lingshan and the Daoist deities of the Celestial Court in the background.

The game introduces cultural and natural scenery derived from the real world into its setting. It features, for example, scenes based on the Kaiyuan Temple in Quanzhou, the Wulong Temple in Langzhong, and the Dazu Rock Carvings, among others.

Each chapter concludes with an animated cutscene that reflects on and explores the narrative and thematic elements of the game. The first three cutscenes are grounded in Chinese philosophy. The fourth cutscene portrays love, while the fifth cutscene addresses grief and anger. The final cutscene serves as a reverse-chronological flashback to a few key events from the Journey to the West.

=== Plot ===
After escorting his master, the Tang Monk, and retrieving the Buddhist scriptures in a pilgrimage to the West, Sun Wukong ascends to Buddhahood. Yet, he rejects life in the Celestial Court for the simple joys of life on Mount Huaguo. The Court grows mistrustful and sends an army led by Erlang Shen to force him to submit. Sun Wukong duels Erlang Shen, but he is incapacitated by the circlet that binds him and is sealed in stone on the mountain. He is severed from his six senses, corresponding to six powerful relics. Over the next centuries, the monkeys of the mountain seek to recover the relics to revive him.

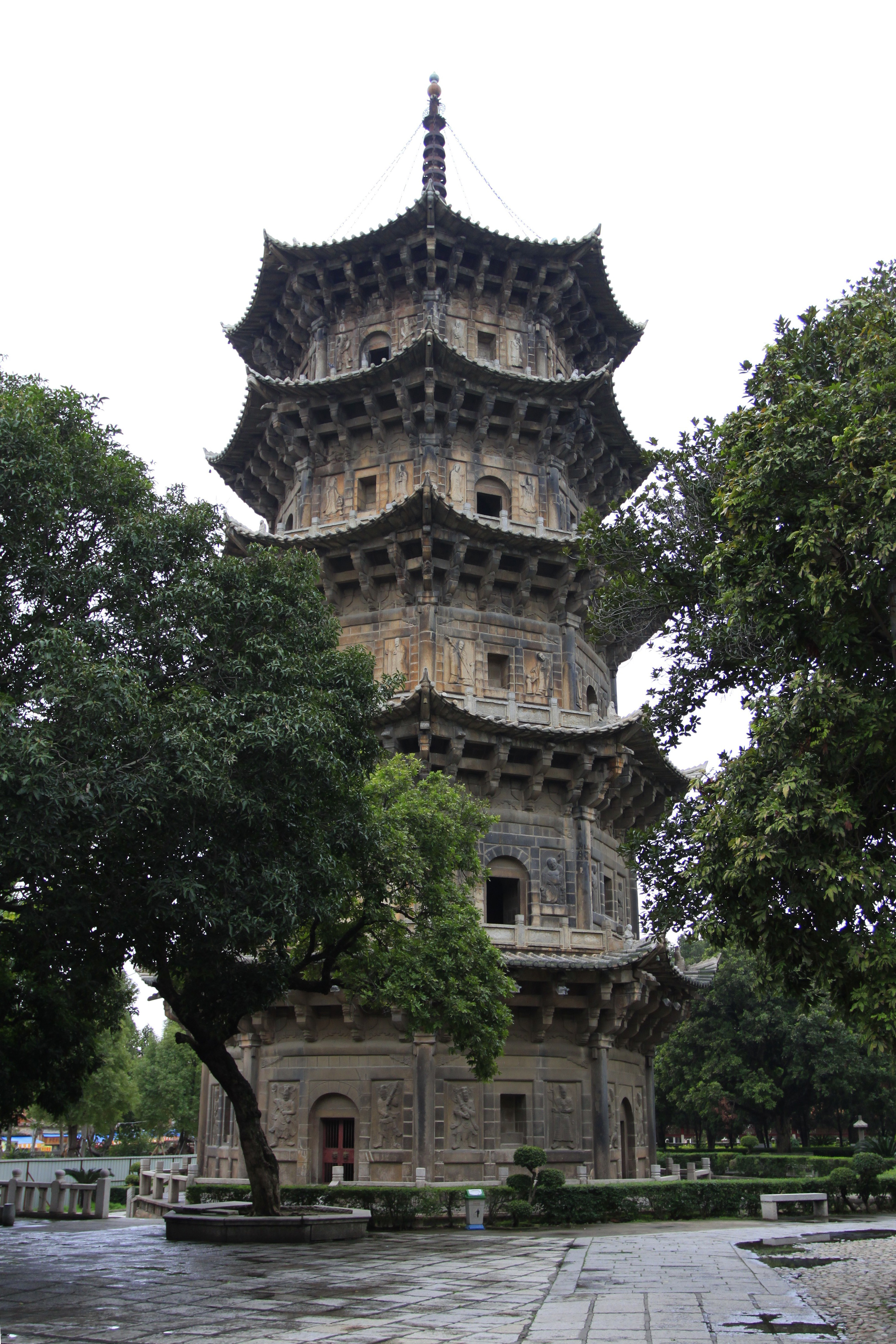
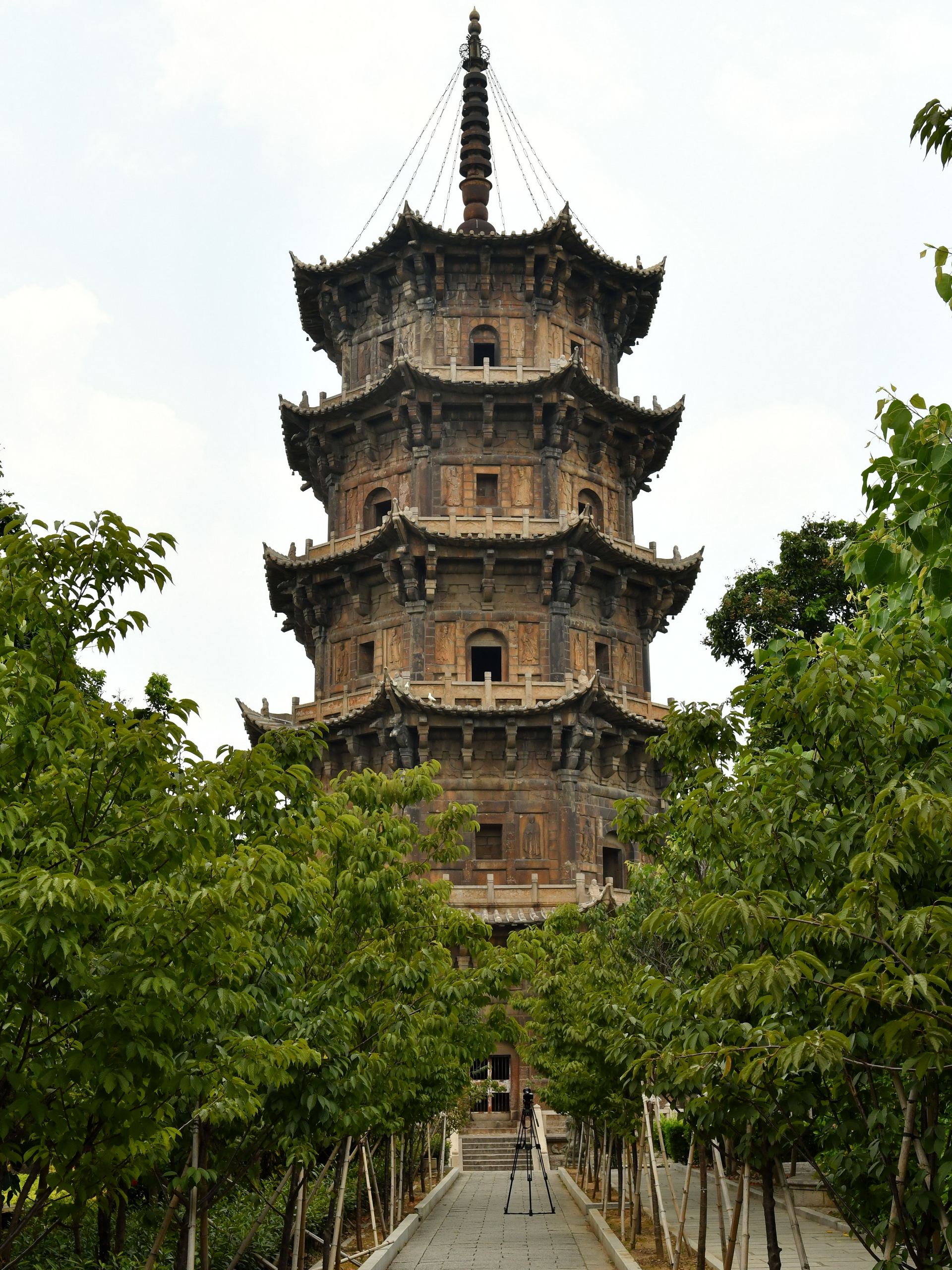
In the game, the Black Bear Guai and the Destined One fight near a tower based on the Kaiyuan Temple's twin pagodas in Quanzhou.

The Destined One, one of the monkeys, traverses Black Wind Mountain and is assisted by the local Keeper through this place. He defeats the Black Bear Guai, who surrenders, and takes the Craving Eyes relic that the bear has enshrined atop a pagoda. The Destined One then travels to the barren Yellow Wind Ridge. He defeats the Yellow Wind Sage, who uses Bodhisattva Lingji's severed head to contain the Fuming Ears relic. A Headless Monk, revealed to be Lingji, restores his head and hands over the relic to the monkey. The Destined One continues to The New West, a cold mountainous region. Yellowbrow, appearing in the guise of Maitreya, has the Hubris Nose relic submerged in a frozen lake. He sends Kang-Jin Star after the monkey. During a fight, she crashes into the Gold Cymbals imprisoning Zhu Bajie, an old friend of Sun Wukong. Bajie escapes and joins the quest to gather the relics. The Destined One defeats Yellowbrow, who flees and falls into the lake. Maitreya fishes the relic out of the lake for the monkey. The Destined One and Zhu Bajie arrive at The Webbed Ridge. The Fourth Sister of a spider guai family aids the monkey. The Second Sister captures Bajie and brings him to the matriarch, the Violet Spider, but the monkey rescues him. The Violet Spider flees to the Hundred-Eyed Daoist Master, but he absorbs the Envious Tongue relic that he previously gave her and thereby mortally injures her. The spider sisters retaliate against the master. The Destined One joins the sisters in the battle, which results in the master's defeat. Bajie and the Violet Spider, who were once lovers, share a final glance, but Bajie sorrowfully turns away and walks toward the reappeared relic. The Destined One and Zhu Bajie fight their way to the Flaming Mountains. The monkey rescues someone who alleges to be Pingping, the daughter of the Bull King and Princess Fair Fox. The Bull King sees through the ruse and recognizes his son Red Boy beneath the disguise. He gives the Grieved Body relic to the monkey, but Red Boy intercepts and consumes it. The Destined One and Bajie defeat Red Boy. Rakshasi, his mother, pleads for mercy and offers her Plantain Fan. However, Red Boy refuses to submit and kills himself, which leads to the relic's reemergence.

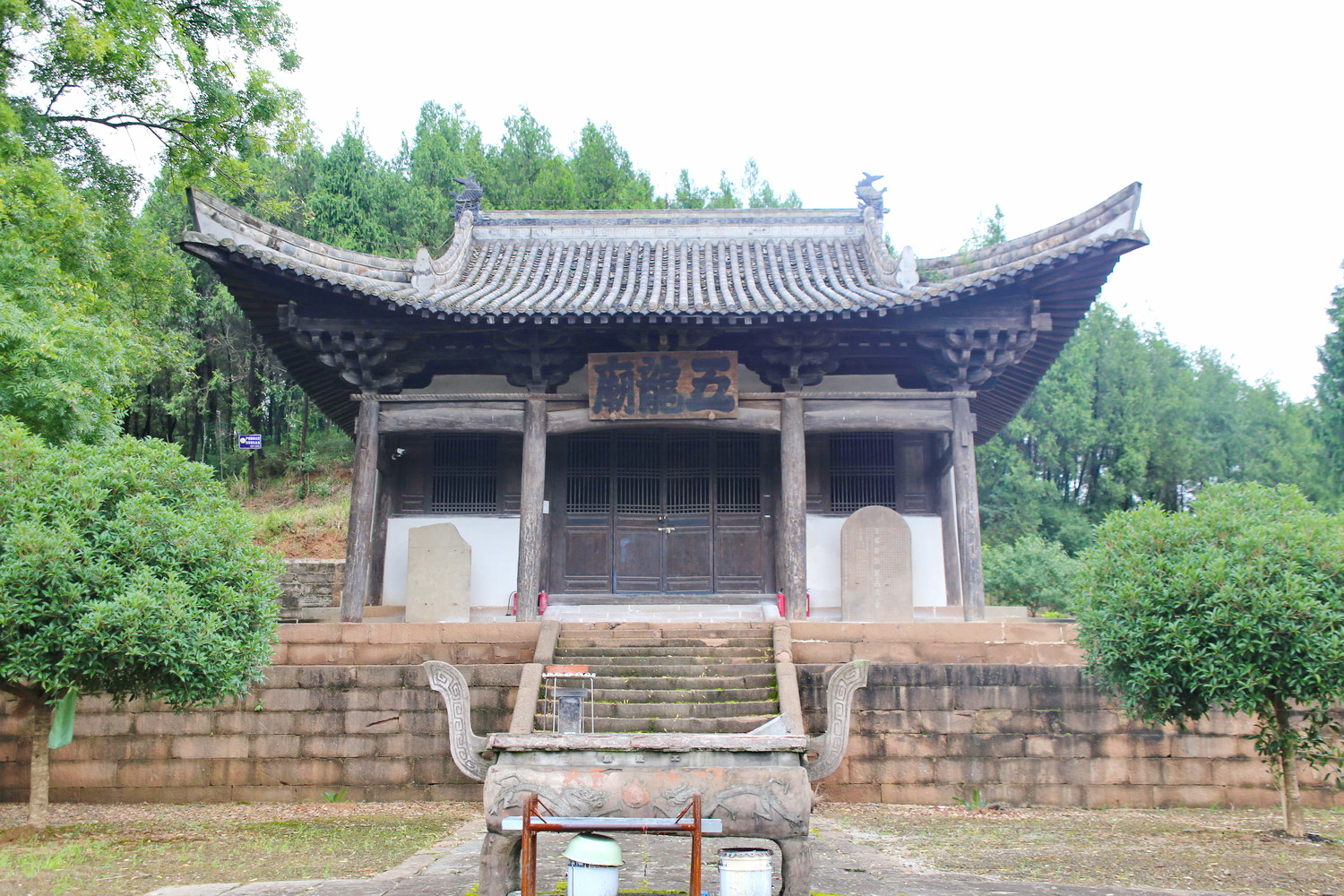
In the game, the battle between Erlang Shen and the Destined One happens near a building based on the Wulong Temple in Langzhong.

In the Great Pagoda located in The New West, Maitreya guides Erlang Shen and the Destined One to Mount Mei. Here, the Destined One defeats Erlang Shen and the Four Heavenly Kings. Erlang Shen, who took the Mind of Sun Wukong after their battle many ages ago, unleashes Wukong's memories from his third eye and shares his realization that their fight back then allowed Wukong to set a path to break free through a mortal death.

The Destined One and Zhu Bajie return to Mount Huaguo. They retrieve Sun Wukong's armor and Jingubang. They pass through the stone on the mountain's summit into a realm shaped by Wukong's lingering memories. The Old Monkey ferries them across its waters. The group encounters versions of their present selves, which prompts the Old Monkey to reveal that the Destined One is the mind of Sun Wukong. He says that Wukong's mind is lost, as the mind is an essence unique to every life and is destined to fade away at life's end. Thus, he explains, Wukong can never return as he was, but the universe will always bear him a successor—the Destined One. At the journey's end, the Destined One defeats Sun Wukong's broken shell. The five relics, obtained during the journey, unite with the Destined One. As the shell dissipates, Wukong's circlet materializes on its head and drops into the shallow water. In one ending, the Old Monkey places the circlet on the Destined One and thereby binds him. In the other ending, having recovered Sun Wukong's memories from Erlang Shen, the Destined One does not wear the circlet and remains free.

== Development ==
Black Myth: Wukong is a game developed and published by Game Science. On February 25, 2018, the decision was made to create a single-player game. In December 2018, the development team relocated from Shenzhen to Hangzhou.

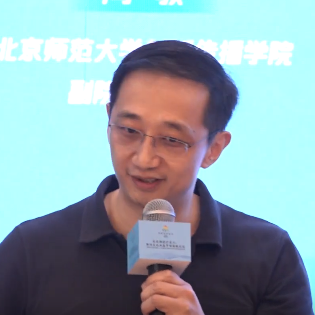
Feng Ji served as the director and producer on Black Myth: Wukong.

The developers set out to create a single-player game that reflected their own style with an emphasis on traditional cultural themes. The focus on the action role-playing genre for both the studio and this project emerged after a company-wide survey revealed that action role-playing games were the games with the longest playtimes on Steam among the staff. Feng Ji said that this approach would allow them to better understand and empathize with players, because they themselves would be players of the type of games they were creating. The developers discussed themes such as xianxia and wuxia, but were most enthusiastic about the Journey to the West. Ultimately, they chose to adapt the Journey to the West and craft a story following the ending of that tale. The series' title Black Myth was adopted to reflect the dark themes explored through Chinese mythology. The game's title became Black Myth: Wukong, because the character Sun Wukong was the most prominent link between the novel and the game.

Characters from the novel were selected and, based on these ideas, thirteen levels were conceived. For example, these levels included Lion Camel Ridge, Kingdom of Women, Black Wind Mountain, Yellow Wind Ridge, and Flaming Mountains. However, scheduling constraints led to the prioritization and creation of only some of these levels. By the end of 2018, the core gameplay functions were implemented and the level for Mount Huaguo was basically formed. The work then shifted to the level for Black Wind Mountain.

Game Science unveiled Black Myth: Wukong with a trailer showcasing gameplay from its pre-alpha build on August 20, 2020. The trailer demonstrated the game built on Unreal Engine 4. It showed the protagonist exploring the environment and fighting various foes. It featured the level for Black Wind Mountain. The studio released the video on social media without contacting media outlets. Within one day, the trailer amassed nearly 2 million views on YouTube and 10 million views on Bilibili. The studio's intention was to attract potential employees to help build the game. The trailer therefore deliberately presented the Black Wind Mountain level in its current state of development, rather than being modified specifically for the demonstration. The team started with seven people and had about thirty people around the time of the announcement. In the past, they recruited within their own personal network, but they realized that this approach was not enough for the project. The trailer's popularity far exceeded their expectations and resulted in over 10 thousand applicants, but they maintained their plans to recruit between ten and fifteen people for the time being to avoid expanding too quickly and losing sight of their original vision. By the end of the development, as shown by the game's end credits, the team had grown to 140 members.

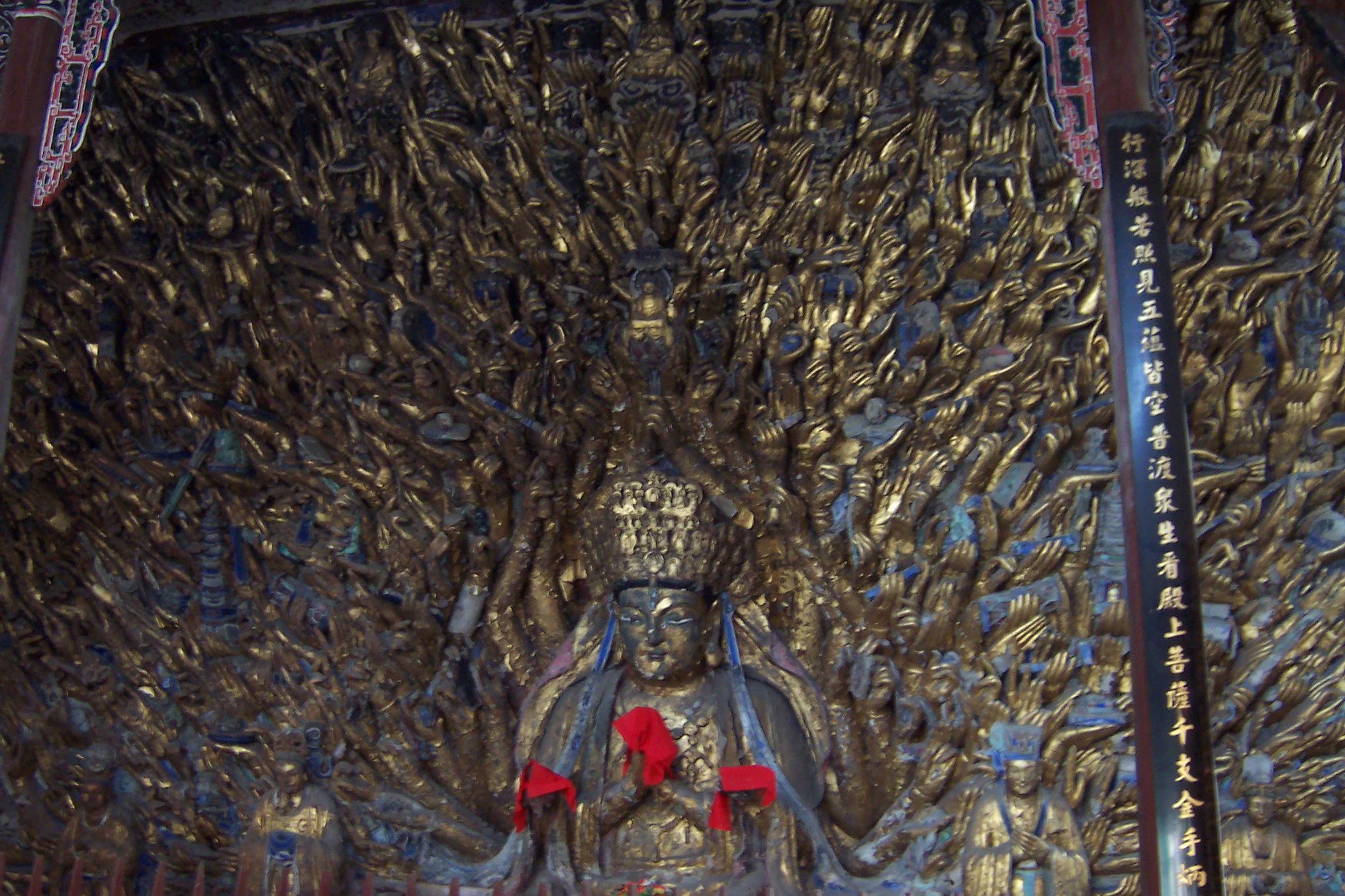
The development team scanned scenes such as the Thousand-Armed Guanyin statue, part of the Dazu Rock Carvings, for the game.

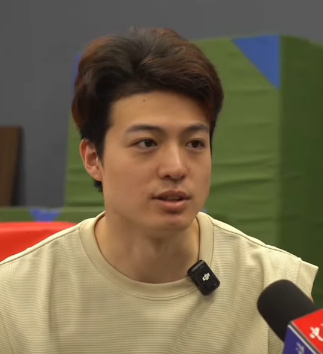
The performances of Yin Kai and other actors were motion captured for the game.

Black Myth: Wukong was built using Unreal Engine 5. It was initially built using the engine's predecessor, Unreal Engine 4. The switch to Unreal Engine 5 was made in 2021. The move to the newer engine further supported the goal of achieving a high degree of realism in the style.

In designing the environment, the developers conducted on-site studies of various real-world locations in cooperation with local cultural institutions. They created scans of scenes, including buildings and statues, from numerous locations that contributed to the design. Over the course of four years, they traveled extensively across China to carry out this work. In the first year, Yang Qi and others scouted various locations to determine a scanning plan. The overall effort resulted in an expansive library of assets that far exceeded the game's actual needs.

Motion capture of performances by several actors was used to animate the movements of different characters. The actor Yin Kai, who is a martial arts practitioner, provided the motion capture for the Destined One and several other characters. Most of his performances were for actions done by the protagonist during combat.

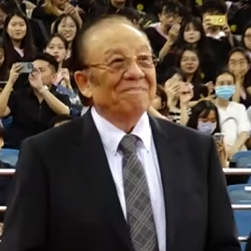
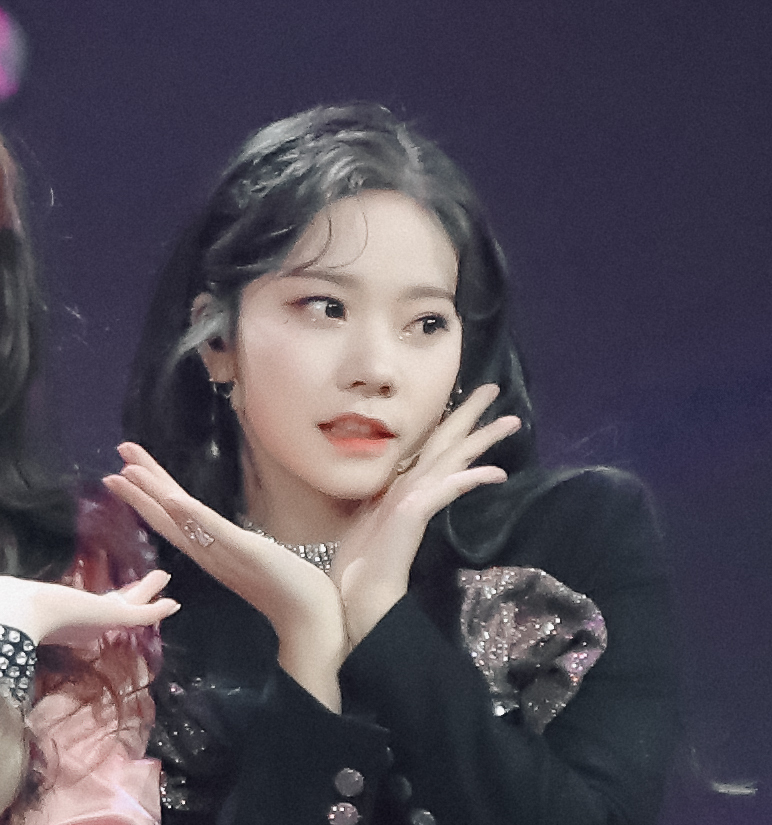
The game's soundtrack features various singers, including Yang Hongji and Zhang Zining.

8082 Audio produced the game's sound, including the music and voice work. It created the music using Chinese instruments and Western orchestral elements. It incorporated musical vocal styles rooted in Chinese traditions, such as Shanbei storytelling, Hua'er folk singing from Gansu, and Buddhist chanting. A notable musical highlight is a symphonic adaptation of "Yungong Xunyin", a theme song composed by Xu Jingqing for the 1986 television series Journey to the West. For the English voiceovers, Game Science was interested in and supportive of voice actors exploring regional accents, such as a Brummie accent for the character Yin Tiger. PitStop Productions, the studio producing the English voiceovers, approached this on a character-by-character basis and aimed to keep the voices fairly broad rather than tied to particular places in the game.

The game's artwork was produced in a variety of forms. Its six animated cutscenes were created by multiple animation studios. The art style of the first cutscene "I See" was inspired by the Shanghai Animation Film Studio's classic works and lianhuanhua comic strips. For its aesthetic, both xieshi (realist) and xieyi (expressive) techniques were combined. The sixth cutscene "Unfinished" was illustrated in the art style of lianhuanhua with elements inspired by the ink line drawing technique baimiao and old murals such as the Dunhuang murals. The remaining cutscenes employed a range of styles, which included stop motion and anime. Artists from the China Academy of Art created the art used for the game's character portraits and in-game murals. The art for the portraits was made as Song-style ink illustrations on silk. It was done using both gongbi and xieyi techniques. The art for the murals was made as color paintings on silk using traditional techniques. It drew inspiration from the art styles of paintings from the Song dynasty as well as Journey to the West illustrated books and block prints from either the Ming or Qing dynasties. Some examples of these paintings from the Song dynasty were Searching the Mountain, Gathering Herbs, Monkey and Cats, and Five Hundred Arhats.

Black Myth: Wukong was developed on a US$70 million budget over six years, as reported by Bloomberg. The project was partially funded by the investor Hero Games. Game Science had previously developed two mobile games before it cautiously took on the larger-scale project—an approach shaped by necessity to stay afloat as a new studio and by the team's prior experience with the risks of large-scale development at former employer Tencent. The studio initially did not have high expectations for profitability due to the high costs for research and development. Its initial expectation was that the game would sell between 3 and 5 million units, which would be enough to ensure the game's viability and pave the way for future projects. The Zhejiang Provincial Tax Service cited a statement by a Game Science financial manager regarding tax incentives for research and development expenses, which specified that the game's development costs were estimated to have exceeded CN¥300 million (US$42 million). This figure does not represent the whole budget, but details the research and development costs directly incurred by Game Science (excluding broader expenses and external contributions) applicable to a tax policy aimed at promoting technological innovation across industries.

== Release ==
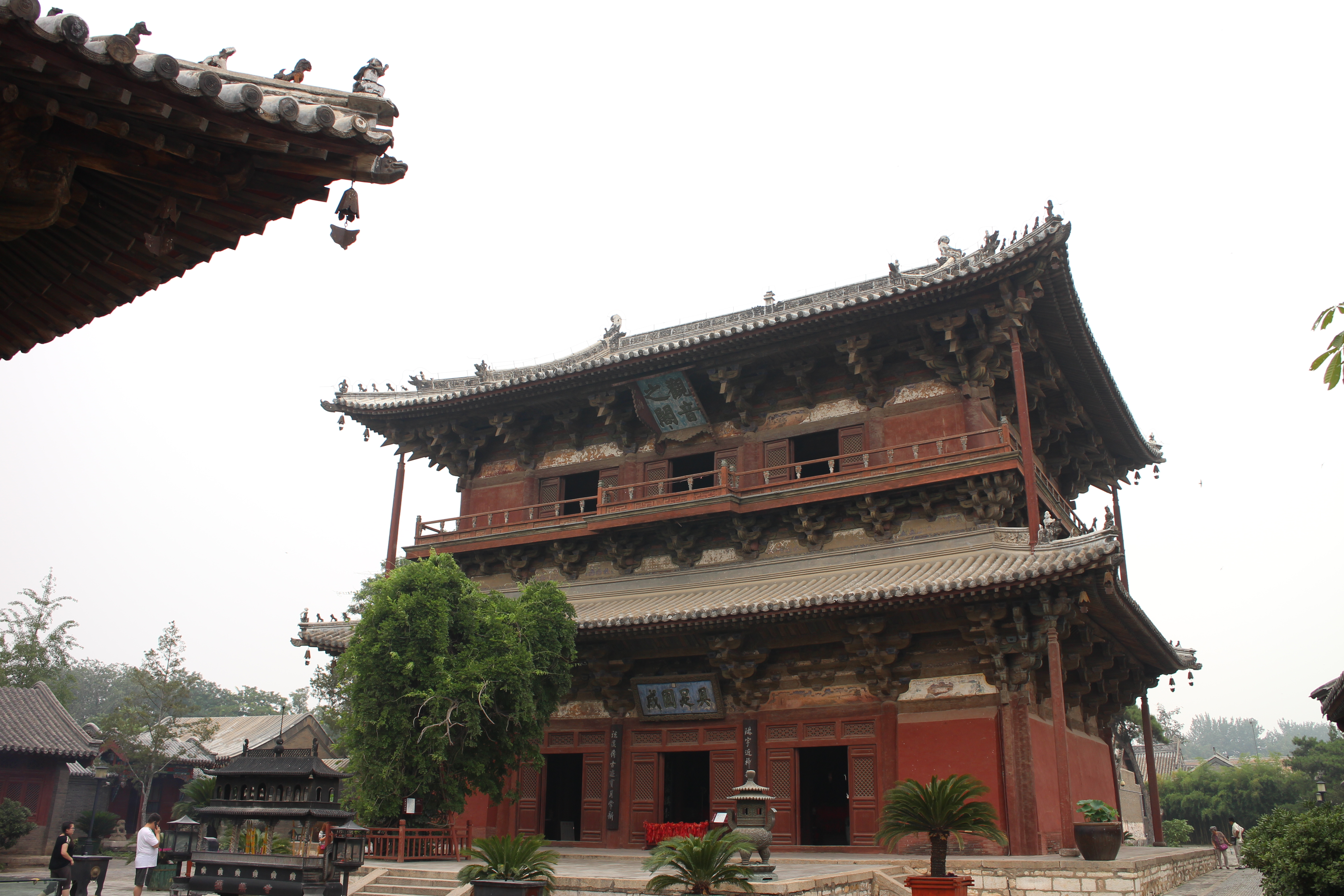
In a trailer, a battle between the Destined One and Kang-Jin Loong occurs near a building based on the Dule Temple in Tianjin.

Black Myth: Wukong was released for PC (Windows) and PlayStation 5 on August 20, 2024. It was released for Xbox Series X/S on August 20, 2025. It is the first installment in the Black Myth series.

On August 20, 2020, Game Science unveiled Black Myth: Wukong with a trailer showcasing gameplay from its pre-alpha build. In January 2023, the studio released a short film celebrating the Year of the Rabbit, which revealed that the game would be released in the summer of 2024. During The Game Awards in December 2023, the studio released a trailer announcing the release date as August 20, 2024.

In June 2024, Game Science disclosed that the Xbox Series X/S version of the game was delayed for optimization to meet their quality standards. Media reports suggested that this may be due to the technical limitations of Xbox Series S, while some sources specifically suggested a memory leak as the possible issue. IGN reported that the delay was, according to an unnamed source, because of an exclusivity deal with Sony and not technical issues. After speaking to his sources, Giant Bomb's Jeff Grubb stated that Sony had no marketing deal in place to keep the game as an exclusive. In September 2024, Microsoft responded that the delay was not due to Xbox limitations "that have been raised to us." In January 2025, Feng Ji made a social media post about the Xbox situation, mentioning that the "10 GB of shared memory" was difficult to resolve without having several years of optimization experience. In June 2025, Game Science announced the Xbox version's release date and explained that "Bringing Black Myth: Wukong to Xbox Series X|S—and ensuring the experience met our internal quality standards—was no easy feat. Fortunately, we were able to complete this challenging task smoothly within the first year of the game's official release."

For the launch, Black Myth: Wukong received four editions: Digital Standard Edition, Digital Deluxe Edition, Deluxe Edition, and Collector's Edition. The Digital Standard Edition contains the base game. The Digital Deluxe Edition provides, alongside the base game, extra in-game content and a selected digital soundtrack. The content consists of the weapon Bronzecloud Staff; the equipment Folk Opera Mask, Folk Opera Almsgiving Armor, Folk Opera Leather Bracers, and Folk Opera Buskins; and the curio Wind Chimes. The two physical editions, the Deluxe Edition and the Collector's Edition, contain an activation code for the Digital Deluxe Edition on WeGame for JD.com purchases or Steam for overseas purchases. The Deluxe Edition comes with the physical collectibles: Steel Case, The Constricting Headband, Chaos at the Peach Banquet (color print on silk scroll), Wind Chime (necklace), Thunderstone (ring), Gold Sun Crow (pin), Stamps and Postcard, and Warranty Certificate. For the Collector's Edition, these are: Steel Case, Confront Destiny (protagonist figurine), Teaching of the Heart Sutra (color print on silk scroll), Wind Chime, Thunderstone, Gold Sun Crow, Stamps and Postcard, and Warranty Certificate. Discs were not included in these editions. Game Science stated that it was still exploring options to offer discs, but that limitations in offline resources made it difficult to offer discs simultaneously with the release.

Black Myth: Wukong was the most-wishlisted game on Steam from May 2024 onwards. It was available for pre-order starting in June 2024. The in-game content Trailblazer's Scarlet Gourd, which can also be obtained through gameplay progression, was a bonus incentive for pre-ordering. The game ranked first on Steam's global top sellers chart by early August 2024, ahead of the release. The game's launch coincided with the download bandwidth usage on Steam reaching 79.3 terabytes per second, which was a new record. Hero Games, a marketing partner, reportedly sent some content creators an email with an activation code for the game and guidelines to not discuss certain topics such as politics, feminism, and other things in their coverage of the game at launch.

The PlayStation 5 physical edition of Black Myth: Wukong includes a disc containing the base game and a voucher code to redeem the Deluxe Edition content. It was released in December 2024 or January 2025 depending on the region.

=== Post-release content ===
In December 2024, Black Myth: Wukong received a free update comprising new content, such as a boss battle mode unlocked following the story campaign, a map for each chapter, and an armor set created to celebrate the Chinese New Year.

Game Science planned Black Myth: Wukong as the first installment in a Black Myth series that features stories based on Chinese mythology. The game was internally referred to as B1, meaning Black Myth One, in reference to its status as the first work in the series.

Black Myth: Zhong Kui followed as the second installment in the Black Myth series. On the decision to begin the development of that game, Feng Ji expressed that it stemmed from a desire to freely and boldly create a completely new title in the series. He noted that although he and the rest of the team were working on a DLC for Black Myth: Wukong, he found himself stuck in a haze following the release of the game, a project that he envisioned for nearly twenty years and one that greatly exceeded expectations. He said that in 2025, he raised the idea to make an entirely new game instead to Yang Qi and other colleagues. He assured that Sun Wukong's story would return in a more complete and substantial way. In an FAQ for Black Myth: Zhong Kui, Game Science stated "[...] to all friends who love Black Myth: Wukong: the westward journey won't end here."

=== Media and merchandise ===
Official events related to Black Myth: Wukong have been organized. The Black Myth: Wukong Symphony Concert was held at venues across China. Attendees received souvenirs such as a commemorative music album. The Black Myth: Wukong Global Concert was held at venues across the world, such as the Peacock Theater, Carnegie Hall, Esplanade – Theatres on the Bay, and many others. The Bilibili New Year's Eve Gala 2024 featured live performances of songs from the game. The Black Myth: Wukong Art Exhibition, which was held at the CAA Art Museum in Hangzhou, showcased a wide variety of artistic works related to the game. It included elements from in-game scenes recreated in physical form, such as a life-sized replica of a keeper's shrine from the Black Wind Mountain level. Visitors received the art book Concept Works of Black Myth: Wukong as a souvenir.

In January 2025, Game Science released a Chinese New Year short film announcing its official merchandise brand BLACKMYTH. The studio conceived it as a gamer lifestyle brand with products related to Black Myth: Wukong and other content. A dedicated team, separate from the game developers, was established to handle the design, production, and operation of the brand.

Other companies also produced official goods for Black Myth: Wukong. Game Science, 8082 Audio, and QQ Music produced a game music album on vinyl in two editions. The People's Music Publishing House and 8082 Audio produced a book comprising sheet music for the game. Moli, a CITIC Press Group subsidiary, produced an art book depicting the game's character portraits in a hardcover edition and a collector's edition in Chinese-style bookbinding. UCG Media produced a Chinese-language guidebook for the game. Moreover, some companies collaborated to create co-branded products based on the game, such as gaming controllers, keyboards, electronics, soft drinks, coffee, fast food, postage stamps, jewelry, and electric cars.

Queen Studios, along with its INART and MORFIG brands, is the official producer of figures for Black Myth: Wukong. They made the Confront Destiny protagonist figurine for the Collector's Edition of the game. During the Wonder Festival Shanghai in October 2024, they debuted the collaboration with a few figurines of different characters and a life-size bust of the Destined One. Their figurine line includes characters such as the Destined One, Zhu Bajie, the Fourth Sister, and others.

== Reception ==
=== Reviews ===
Reception

Aggregate scores
Aggregator	Score
Metacritic	PC: 81/100; PS5: 76/100
OpenCritic	81% recommend

Black Myth: Wukong received "generally favorable" reviews on PC and PlayStation 5 from critics, according to review aggregator Metacritic.

=== Sales ===
On the release day, Black Myth: Wukong reached over 2.2 million concurrent players on Steam, which established it as the second-highest game by this metric, surpassing other popular games such as Elden Ring and Cyberpunk 2077. The feat placed it as the highest single-player game by concurrent players on Steam. According to Bloomberg, the ascent could help the game "seal its place in industry lore." On August 22, 2024, the game reached over 2.4 million concurrent players on Steam. With the milestone, it remained second only to PUBG: Battlegrounds in concurrent players on Steam.

Game Science announced that Black Myth: Wukong sold 10 million units as of August 23, 2024, and reached 3 million concurrent players across all platforms. The achievement made it one of the fastest-selling titles given the timeframe. On the e-commerce platform JD.com, over 1.1 million users attempted to reserve the physical editions comprising both the Deluxe and Collector's Editions. There was a supply of 30 thousand physical units available on the platform, so the units sold out within seconds.

Hero Games CEO Daniel Wu, an investor, shared to Bloomberg that Black Myth: Wukong had sold 18 million units in two weeks. Bloomberg described this as "one of the fastest starts the global gaming industry has seen." Sony revealed that it was the most-downloaded PlayStation 5 game in North America (United States and Canada), Europe, and Japan during August 2024.

During the Tokyo Game Show in September 2024, former Sony Interactive Entertainment (SIE) CEO Ken Kutaragi stated that Black Myth: Wukong sold 20 million units in the first month. On October 1, 2024, during the Unreal Fest Seattle, Epic Games' Unreal Engine VP & GM Bill Clifford stated that the game had surpassed 20 million units sold the previous week and showed a video message from Feng Ji, who conveyed that one of their best decisions may have been to develop the game on Unreal Engine and that they will continue to collaborate closely with Epic Games to create the next generation of immersive virtual experiences. The Guinness World Records listed the game as the "Fastest-selling videogame based on a classic novel" for having sold 20 million units in the first month. At Sony's PlayStation Partner Awards in December 2024, the game received a Grand Award in recognition of its status as one of "the top three titles developed in the Japan and Asia regions with the highest worldwide sales between October 2023 and September 2024." During the Lvl Up Expo 2025, PM Studios CEO Michael Yum confirmed in the affirmative that the game performed very well in its physical sales and shared that "I got a lot of calls like during Christmas and after the New Year's thanking me and saying that it saved their business." The company managed the distribution of the PlayStation 5 physical edition across North America, South America, Europe, Australia, and New Zealand. During Bilibili World 2025, SIE Shanghai President Tatsuo Eguchi remarked that the PlayStation team was delighted by the game's great success and gained a lot of confidence as there was finally a Chinese AAA game selling very well globally, with the game's sales far exceeding 20 million units.

In response to an inquiry from Eurogamer regarding an unconfirmed sales figure of 30 million units in a June 2026 Communist Youth League report, Game Science stated that "At this time, we don't have any new sales figures to share beyond our previously announced milestone of over 10m copies sold across all platforms within four days of launch. What we can say is that Black Myth: Wukong has achieved results beyond our expectations in both China and international markets, and we remain incredibly grateful for the enthusiasm and support from players around the world. It's been wonderful to see the game continue to resonate with audiences globally, and we're deeply appreciative of the community and media partners that [have] supported the title since launch." During a conversation with 3DJuegos at the Black Myth: Wukong Global Concert in Los Angeles, people from the studio remarked that they were not working with this figure and that about half of the sales were generated outside China. During an interview at the China Academy of Art in October 2026, Yang Qi said that overseas players account for over 50% of the playerbase.

=== Impact ===
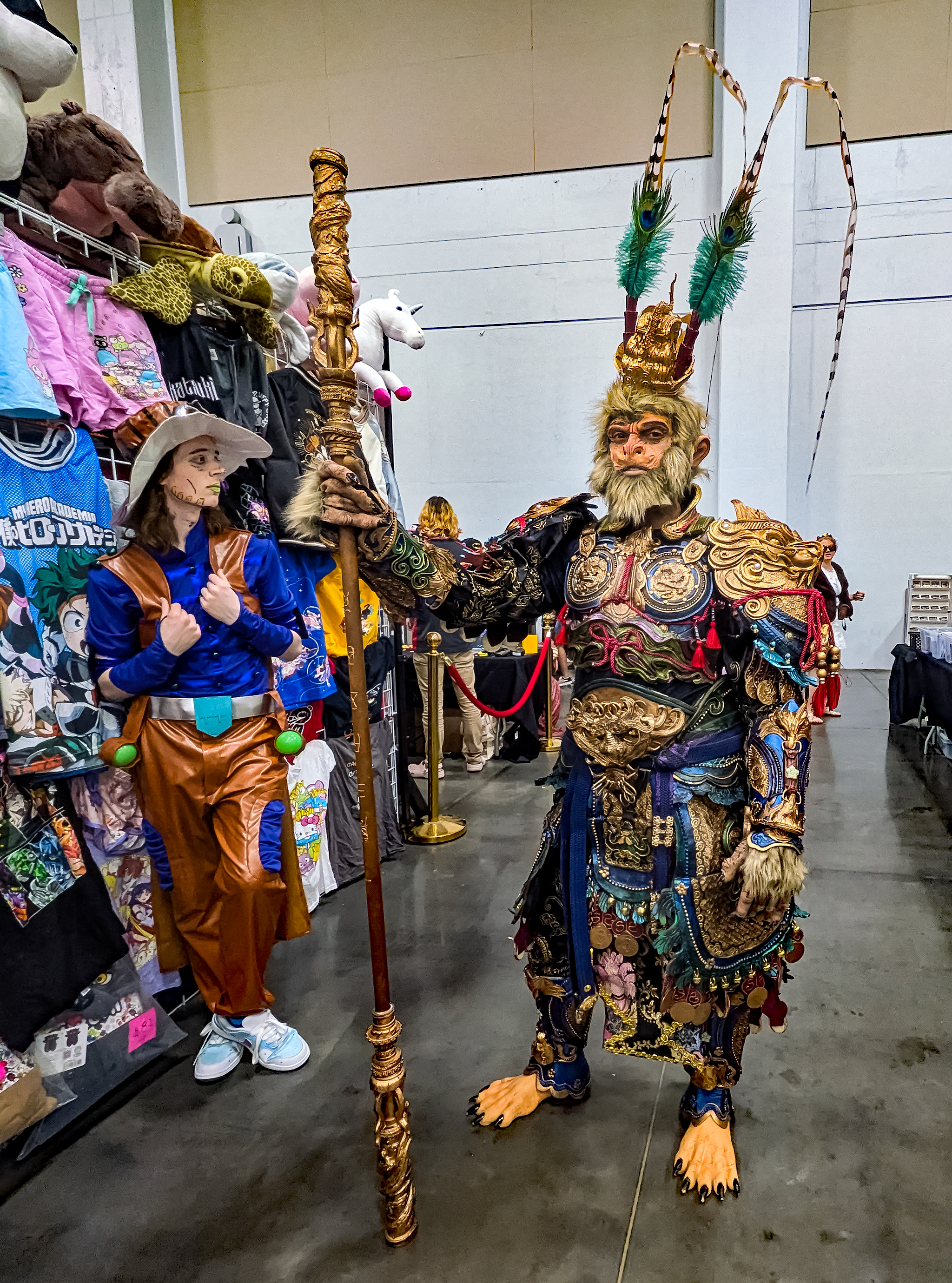
Cosplayers dressed as the characters Rakshasi and the Destined One

Black Myth: Wukong is regarded as the first AAA game from the Chinese video game industry. Nikkei Asia reported that it is seen as a new standard bearer for games from the Chinese industry and could inspire Chinese developers to pursue ambitious projects that draw international audiences. Following the game's success, industry professionals in China observed increased confidence in domestic studios. For instance, Li Shen, former CTO of Tencent Games China and Epic Games China, said that although Chinese developers have always been interested in single-player games, publishers became more willing to invest after Black Myth: Wukong sold millions of units globally. As reported by The Diplomat, the game's success reflects a broader trend of the Chinese industry, following its Japanese and Korean counterparts, to harness organic popularity to stimulate the global appeal of creative and cultural exports. The South China Morning Post reported that the game's success is expected to positively impact the Chinese industry, as government agencies may become more inclined to encourage domestic studios to pursue AAA projects. For example, as Reuters reported, the Chinese state media's highly positive response to the game signals a recognition of the industry's potential value in terms of culture and export. Tatsuo Eguchi, President of SIE Shanghai, said the Chinese industry before and after Black Myth: Wukong were like two different worlds.

The popularity of Black Myth: Wukong boosted PlayStation 5 sales in the Chinese market. For instance, the console's sales reached the top for video game hardware and doubled compared to the same period last year on the e-commerce platform Tmall in the week leading up to the game's launch. Former PlayStation Studios President Shuhei Yoshida commented on the sales in the Chinese market that "I saw some news that after the release of Black Myth: Wukong last year, there were no PS5s left to buy. It sold out!" SIE Shanghai President Tatsuo Eguchi said that the week of the game's release saw the highest weekly sales for PlayStation in China, surpassing previous sales records, including those set by the initial launches of PlayStation 4 and PlayStation 5. He shared that the global inventory was shifted to prioritize the Chinese market to alleviate the shortage within the country, which lasted about a week or two. Sony revealed that third-party games, specifically highlighting "an action RPG title from China" (confirmed to be Black Myth: Wukong) and another title, were key contributors to the increased sales in its Game and Network Services division during the three-month period ended September 30, 2024.

Black Myth: Wukong's influence extended beyond gaming. It boosted tourism to the real-world locations that inspired its scenes. It led to a greater global interest in other media related to the Journey to the West. It produced characters popular for cosplay, such as the Fourth Sister and Pingping. At the 2025 World Aquatics Championships, the Chinese team won gold for the team technical routine in artistic swimming, performing a routine inspired by Sun Wukong and set to music from the game.

=== Accolades ===
Black Myth: Wukong received awards, sometimes referred to as kasayas by fans, from awards ceremonies. Beth Park, recognized for her role as a lead performance director on the game, was selected as a BAFTA Breakthrough in 2024.

Ceremony	Category	Result	Ref.
Gamescom Award 2023	Best Visuals	Won	
Gamescom Award 2023	Most Epic	Nominated	
UCG Game Awards 2023	Most Anticipated Game	Won	
Thailand Game Awards 2024	Game of the Year	Won	
Thailand Game Awards 2024	Best PC / Console Game	Won	
Thailand Game Awards 2024	Best Art Direction	Won	
Thailand Game Awards 2024	Best Action Game	Won	
The 42nd Annual Golden Joystick Awards	Ultimate Game of the Year	Won	
The 42nd Annual Golden Joystick Awards	Best Visual Design	Won	
Equinox Latam Game Awards 2024	Game of the Year	Won	
Equinox Latam Game Awards 2024	Best PlayStation Game	Nominated	
Equinox Latam Game Awards 2024	Best PC Game	Won	
Equinox Latam Game Awards 2024	Action Adventure	Nominated	
Equinox Latam Game Awards 2024	Soundtrack	Nominated	
Equinox Latam Game Awards 2024	Art Direction	Nominated	
PlayStation Partner Awards 2024	Grand Award	Won	
PlayStation Partner Awards 2024	Users' Choice	Won	
The Game Awards 2024	Game of the Year	Nominated	
The Game Awards 2024	Best Game Direction	Nominated	
The Game Awards 2024	Best Art Direction	Nominated	
The Game Awards 2024	Best Action Game	Won	
The Game Awards 2024	Players' Voice	Won	
The 2024 Steam Awards	Game of the Year	Won	
The 2024 Steam Awards	Best Game You Suck At	Won	
The 2024 Steam Awards	Outstanding Story-Rich Game	Won	
UCG Game Awards 2024	Game of the Year	Won	
UCG Game Awards 2024	Phenomenon of the Year	Nominated	
UCG Game Awards 2024	Best Artistic Expression	Won	
UCG Game Awards 2024	Players' Voice	Won	
28th Annual D.I.C.E. Awards	Game of the Year	Nominated	
28th Annual D.I.C.E. Awards	Outstanding Achievement in Art Direction	Won	
28th Annual D.I.C.E. Awards	Action Game of the Year	Nominated	
25th Annual Game Developers Choice Awards	Game of the Year	Nominated	
25th Annual Game Developers Choice Awards	Best Audio	Nominated	
25th Annual Game Developers Choice Awards	Best Design	Nominated	
25th Annual Game Developers Choice Awards	Best Narrative	Nominated	
25th Annual Game Developers Choice Awards	Best Technology	Nominated	
25th Annual Game Developers Choice Awards	Best Visual Art	Won	
25th Annual Game Developers Choice Awards	Innovation Award	Nominated	
GEM Awards 2025	GEM of the Year 2024	Won	
GEM Awards 2025	Best Narrative	Nominated	
GEM Awards 2025	Best Art Direction	Won	
GEM Awards 2025	Best Debut (New IP)	Won	
GEM Awards 2025	Best Action/Adventure Game	Won	
GEM Awards 2025	Best Protagonist	Nominated	
