= Kaiyuan Temple (Quanzhou) =

Buddhist temple in Quanzhou, China

- 開元寺
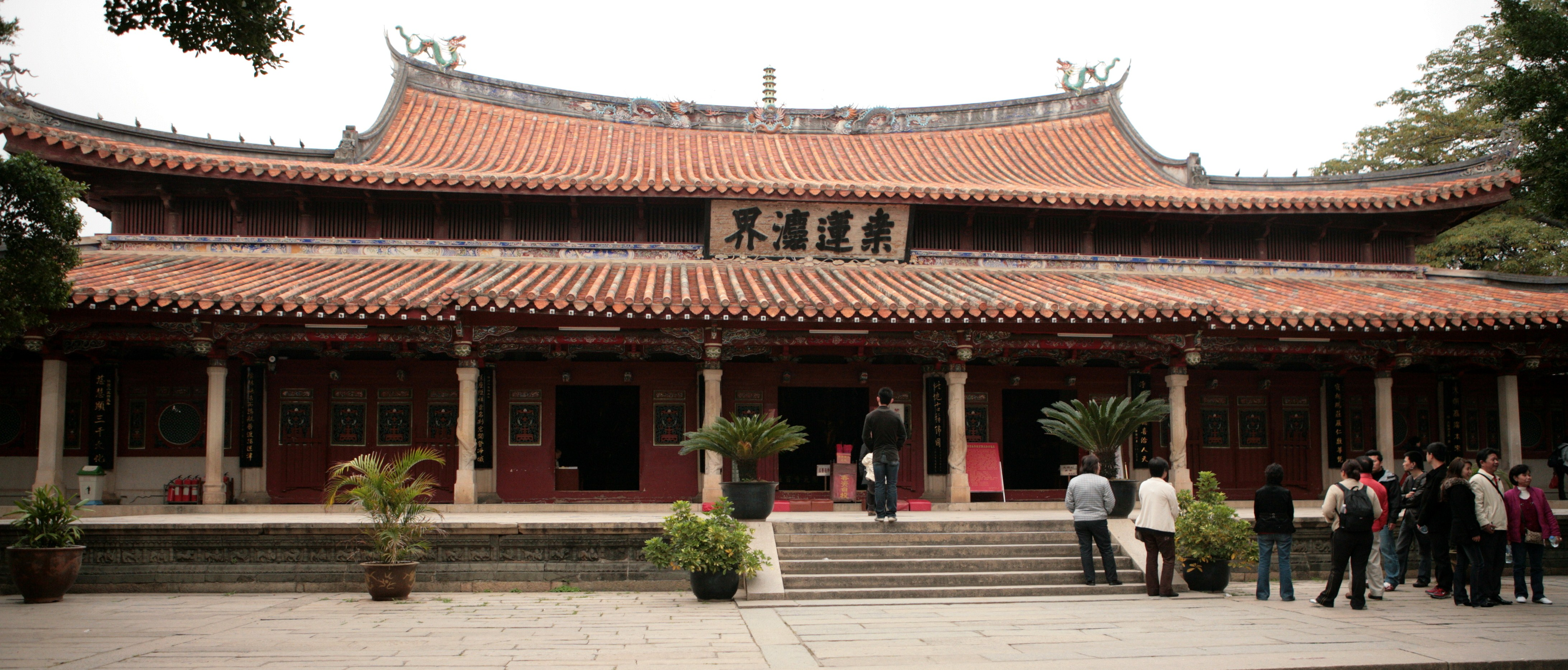
- The Mahavira Hall at the Kaiyuan Temple

- Location within Fujian Location within China

Religion
- Affiliation: Buddhism, Hinduism
- District: Licheng
- Prefecture: Quanzhou
- Province: Fujian

Location
- Country: China
- Prefecture: Quanzhou
- Coordinates: 24°55′00″N 118°34′52″E

Architecture
- Style: Chinese architecture
- Founder: Huang Shougong (黄守恭)
- Established: 686
- Completed: 686
- Site area: 78,000

Website
- http://www.qzdkys.com/

UNESCO World Heritage Site
- Location: China
- Part of: Quanzhou: Emporium of the World in Song-Yuan China
- Criteria: Cultural: (iv)
- Reference: 1561
- Inscription: 2021 (44th Session)

Kaiyuan Temple (simplified Chinese: 开元寺; traditional Chinese: 開元寺; pinyin: Kāiyuán Sì; Pe̍h-ōe-jī: Khai-gôan-sī) is a Buddhist temple located in West Street, Quanzhou, China, and is considered as the largest Buddhist temple in Fujian province with an area of 78,000 square metres (840,000 ft^{2}). The central figures of veneration in the temple are the Five Tathāgathas from Chinese Esoteric Buddhism who are enshrined in the temple's Daxiongbao Hall. In 2021, the temple was inscribed on the UNESCO World Heritage List along with other sites near Quanzhou because of its importance during the medieval global maritime trade based in Quanzhou and its testimony to the global exchange of ideas and cultures. The temple is also one of few in China to contain Hindu monuments, left there by traders from Southern India. It is of Buddhist Dense-Eaves architecture and is most famous for the largest stone pagodas in the world, the twin pagodas of Zhenguo and Renshou, which were completed using stone during the Song dynasty.

== History ==
It was originally built in 685 or 686 during the Tang dynasty (618–907) and renovated with stone during the Song dynasty. The temple situated in the Mulberry garden of landlord Huang Shougong (黄守恭) who was said to dream of a monk begging land from him for building a temple. He donated his garden and changed it into a temple with the name of "Lotus Temple" (莲花寺). In 738 in the Tang dynasty, it was renamed "Kaiyuan Temple", which is still in use now.

Behind its main hall "Daxiongbao Hall", there are some columns with fragments as well is vigraha (icon) of Lord Vishnu from a Vishnu temple built in 1283 by the Tamil Ainnurruvar Valanjiyar Merchant community in Quanzhou. The carvings are dispersed across five primary sites in Quanzhou and the neighboring areas. They were made in the South Indian style, and share close similarities with 13th-century temples constructed in the Chola Nadu region in Tamil Nadu. Nearly all of the carvings were carved with greenish-gray granite, which was widely available in the nearby hills and used in the region's local architecture. In 1983, the Kaiyuan Temple was designated as a national temple.

The Silk trade by sea brought the South Indians to China and the Chinese to Southern Indian ports and it is very likely the Indians took the knowledge of Silk cultivation and fabrics from China back to India. China had a significant influence on South India; examples of Chinese fishing nets in Kochi and fine china pottery still referred to as "Chini chatti" or Chinese pot in Tamil.

== Legend ==
According to legend, there was a wealthy landlord named Huang Shougong who ran a large mulberry garden. One day, while taking a nap, Huang Shougong dreamed of a monk begging him for land to build a temple. Although Huang Shougong was usually kind and generous, he was reluctant to donate such a large piece of his property all at once. In order to make the monk give up, he came up with an idea and said: "I will only donate seeds if the mulberry tree in the garden blooms white lotus within three days."

The first two days, everything was normal. On the third day, a miracle happened. The branches of the lush green mulberry trees in the garden were actually full of white lotus flowers. Huang Shougong was touched by the miracle and willingly donated the land to establish a relationship with the temple. Therefore, Master Kuang Hu, who presided over the construction of the temple, named it "Lotus Temple". Because of this legend, the Main Hall of Kaiyuan Temple was given the elegant name of "Sanglian Dharma Realm" and a plaque with the words "Sanglian Dharma Realm" was hung there.

== Architecture ==
Along the central axis are the Tianwang-dian, Daxiongbao Hall, Sweet Dew Altar of Precepts and Zangjing-ge. There are over 10 halls and rooms on both sides, based on the "Mi Yan Ta" (Dense-Eaves Architectural Style) including Tanyue Ancestral Temple, Virtue Hall and Zunsheng Hall. The twin pagodas are the most iconic features in the site and in Fujian tourism.

=== Tianwang-dian ===
The Tianwang-dian (天王殿, "Hall of the Four Heavenly Kings") was built in the Tang dynasty (618–907). It serves as the Shanmen of the temple. In front of the hall, a wooden plaque with a couplet is hung on the hall. It says "Here is the place the ancients called "Buddha State", all are saints in the streets" (此地古称佛国，满街都是圣人). It was composed by Song dynasty scholar Zhu Xi and inscribed by eminent monk Hong Yi.

=== Daxiongbao Hall ===
The Daxiongbao Hall (大雄宝殿) was originally built in 686 in the Tang dynasty (618–907) and the extant buildings are relics of the late Ming dynasty (1368–1644). It is 20 metres (66 ft) high, 9 rooms wide, 6 rooms deep and covers an area of 1,387.75 square metres (14,937.6 sq ft). The hall preserved the majestic and impressive architectural style of the Tang dynasty. The gilded copper statues of the Five Tathāgatas: Achu Fo (Akshobhya). Bukong Chengjiu Fo (Amoghasiddhi), Piluzhena Fo (Vairocana), Amituofo (Amitābha) and Baosheng Fo (Ratnasambhava), which were made during the Five dynasties and Ten Kingdoms period (907–960), are enshrined in middle of the hall.

=== Zhenguo Pagoda ===
Zhenguo Pagoda (镇国塔) or the Tower of Safeguarding the Nation, is a five-storey wooden pagoda first built in 865 in the Tang dynasty (618–907). It is the East pagoda to its West twin pagoda Renshou. But it was destroyed and rebuilt into stone pagoda in 1238 in the Song dynasty (960–1276). The 48.24-metre (158.3 ft) pagoda was octagonal with five storeys. Every storey is carved with sixteen reliefs with a total of 80 vivid human figures.

=== Renshou Pagoda ===
The Renshou Pagoda (仁寿塔) or the Tower of Longevity, was built in 917 in the Later Liang dynasty (907–923). In 1114 in the Song dynasty, it was renamed "Renshou Pagoda" by the Emperor Huizong. The western location is supposed to represent the Western Paradise in Buddhism. A 1,300 year old mulberry tree stands beside the tower. It is 44.06 metres (144.6 ft) high and has the similar Buddhist Dense-Eaves architecture as the Zhenguo Pagoda.

=== Sweet Dew Altar of Precepts ===
The Sweet Dew Altar of Precepts (甘露戒坛) is used for Buddhist believers to ordain the precepts. The caisson (藻井) above the altar which applies the Ruyi brackets has complex and sophisticated structure. Among the brackets of the pillars around the altar, 24 statues of Flying Apsaras with five-color streamers are erected. They are holding musical instruments like pipa, two-stringed fiddle, castanet etc. and dancing elegantly and vividly. A wood carving sitting Ming dynasty statue of Rocana Buddha is placed on the altar. The lotus throne he sits has a thousand lotus petals, each of which is engraved with a 6-centimetre (2.4 in) statue of Buddha.

== In popular culture ==
The wildly popular game Black Myth: Wukong, a AAA action-role playing game has heavily increased tourism in China, for Fujian the site featured was both the identical-looking Zhenguo Stone or East Pagoda and Renshou Stone or West Pagoda twins during the fight of the main character, "The Destined One," at the Black Bear yaoguai stage. The stage was based on a chapter of the Elder Jinchi and the black bear spirit friend in the world famous classic novel Journey to the West, written in 1591 in the Ming dynasty. The twin pagodas are notable for bearing reliefs of monkey deities including the Cinnabar Cloud Great Sage monkey god and is said to be the inspirational prototype for the character Sun Wukong. Since being listed on the World Heritage List by UNESCO as a cultural heritage as "World Maritime Trade Center of Song and Yuan China" on July 25, 2021, Quanzhou City's tourism popularity has reached an unprecedented high, even surpassing the traditionally popular tourist city of Xiamen, and jumped to first place in Fujian Province.

== Gallery ==
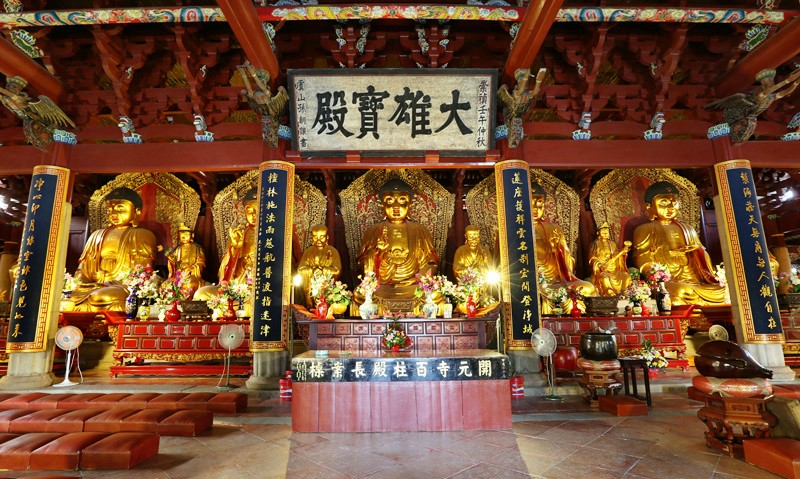
Statues of the Five Tathāgatas, made during the Five dynasties and Ten Kingdoms period (907–960)

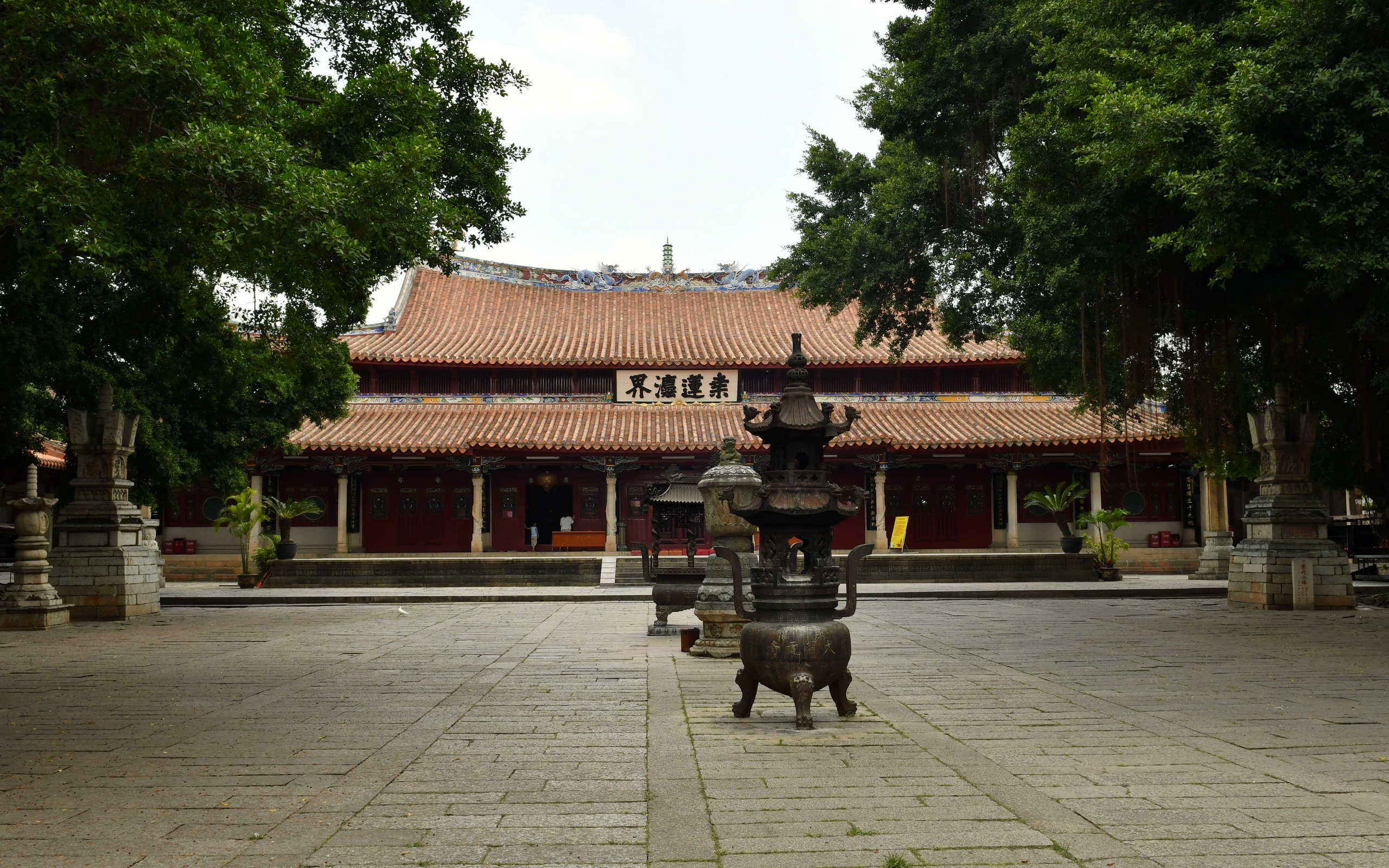
Statues of the Five Tathagathas

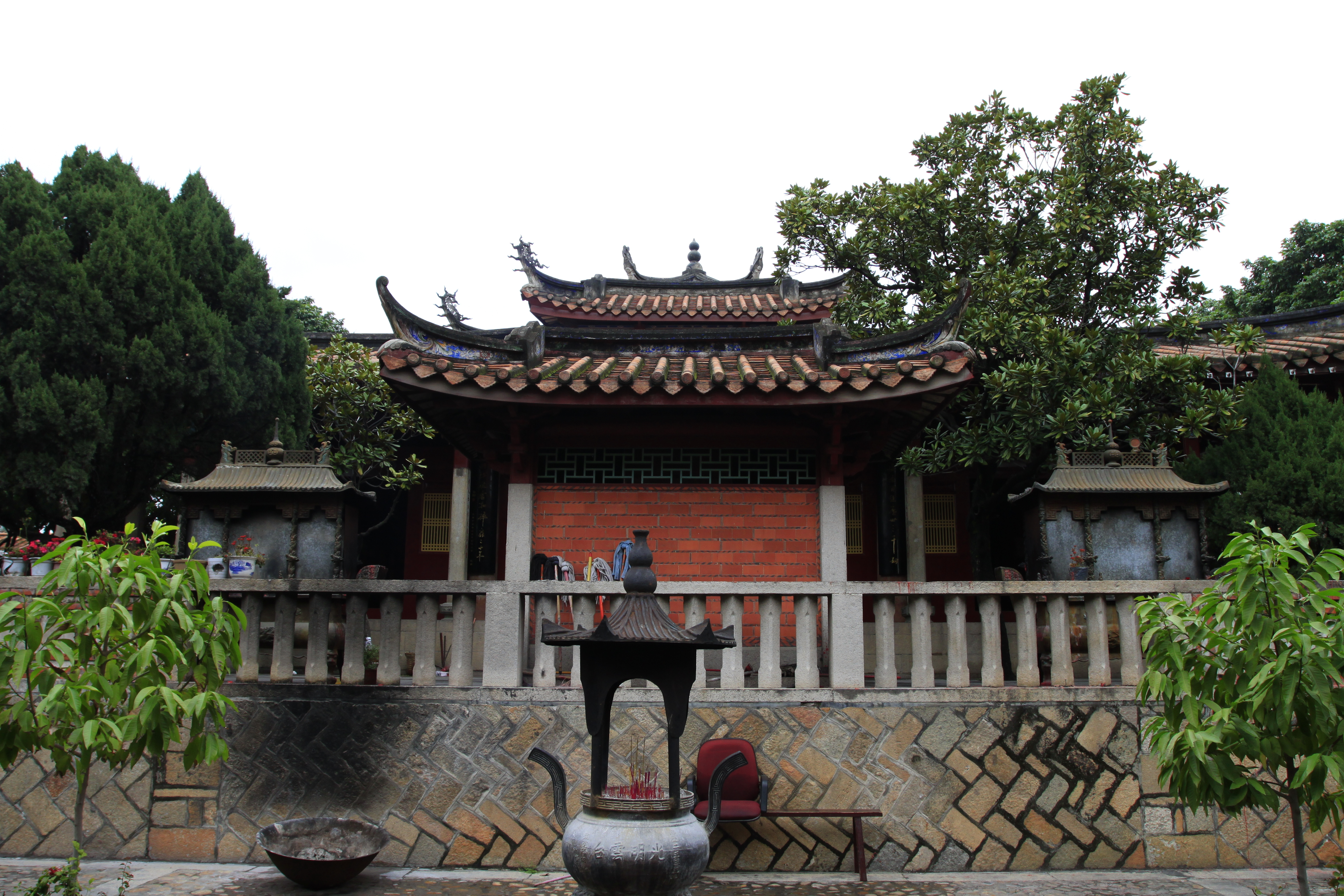
The Sweet Dew Altar of Precepts

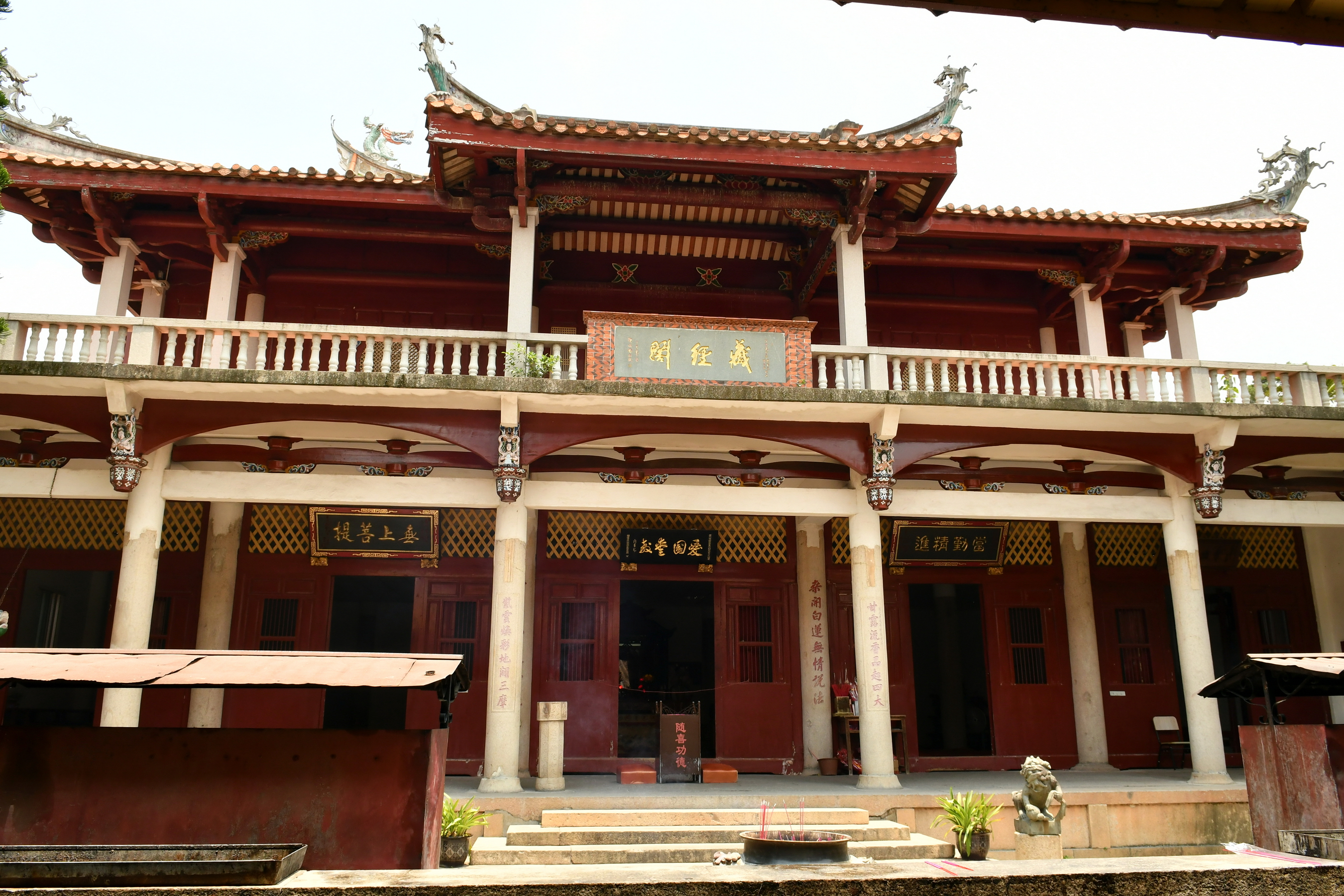
Zangjing-ge

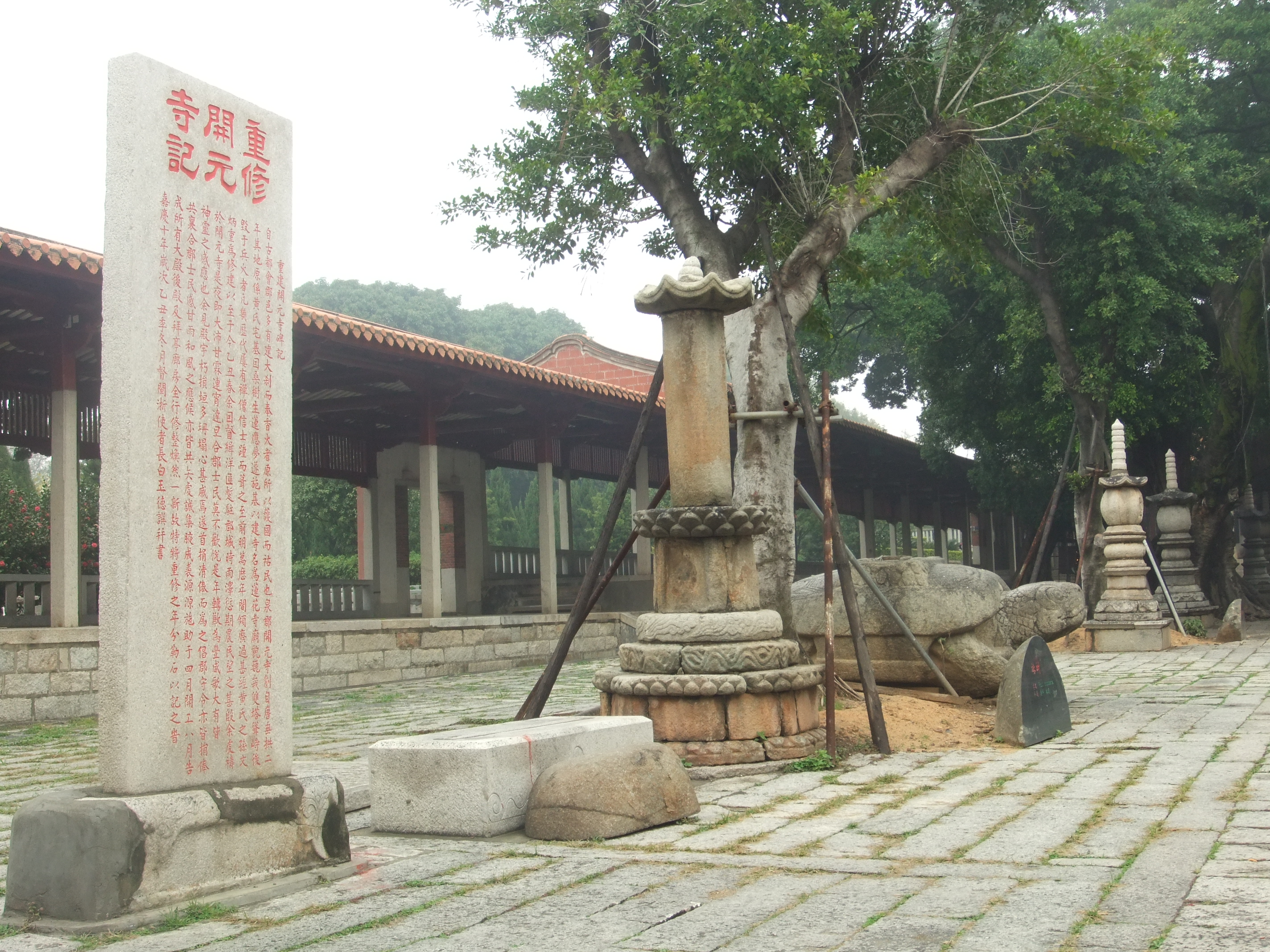
Temple courtyard

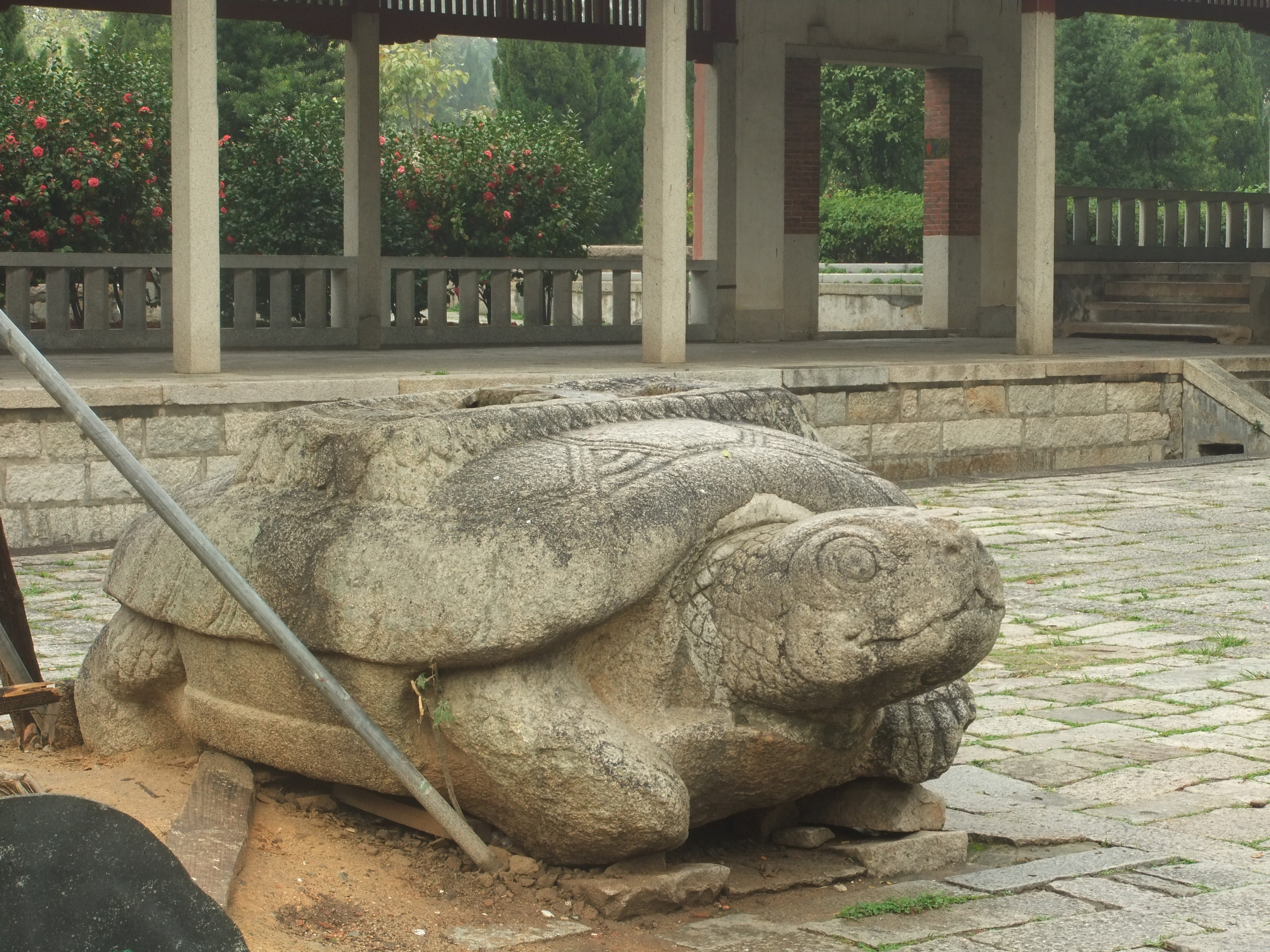
Stone tortoise statue in the temple courtyard

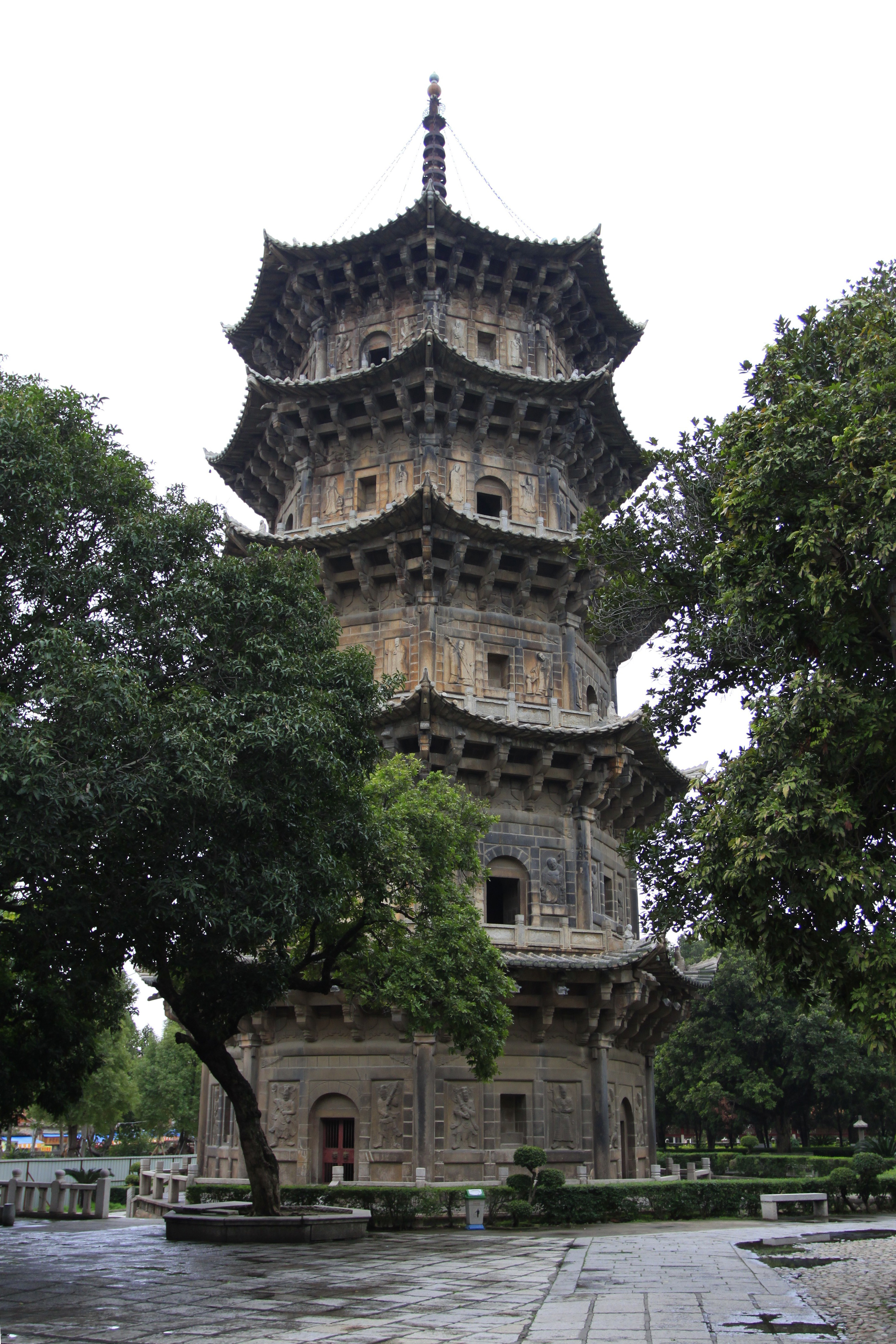
Zhenguo Pagoda

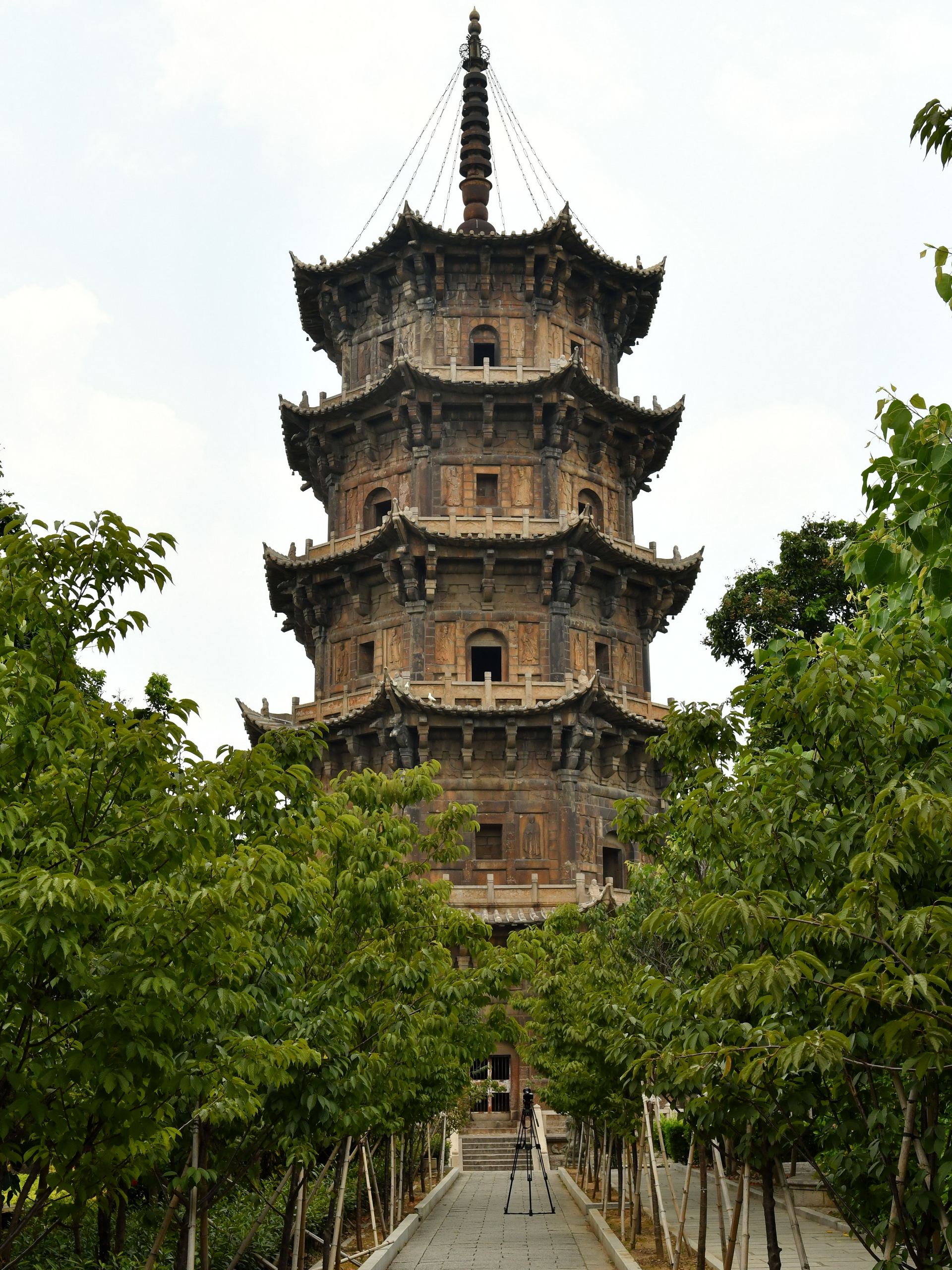
Renshou Pagoda
