= GEM Awards =

Video game convention

Gem Awards
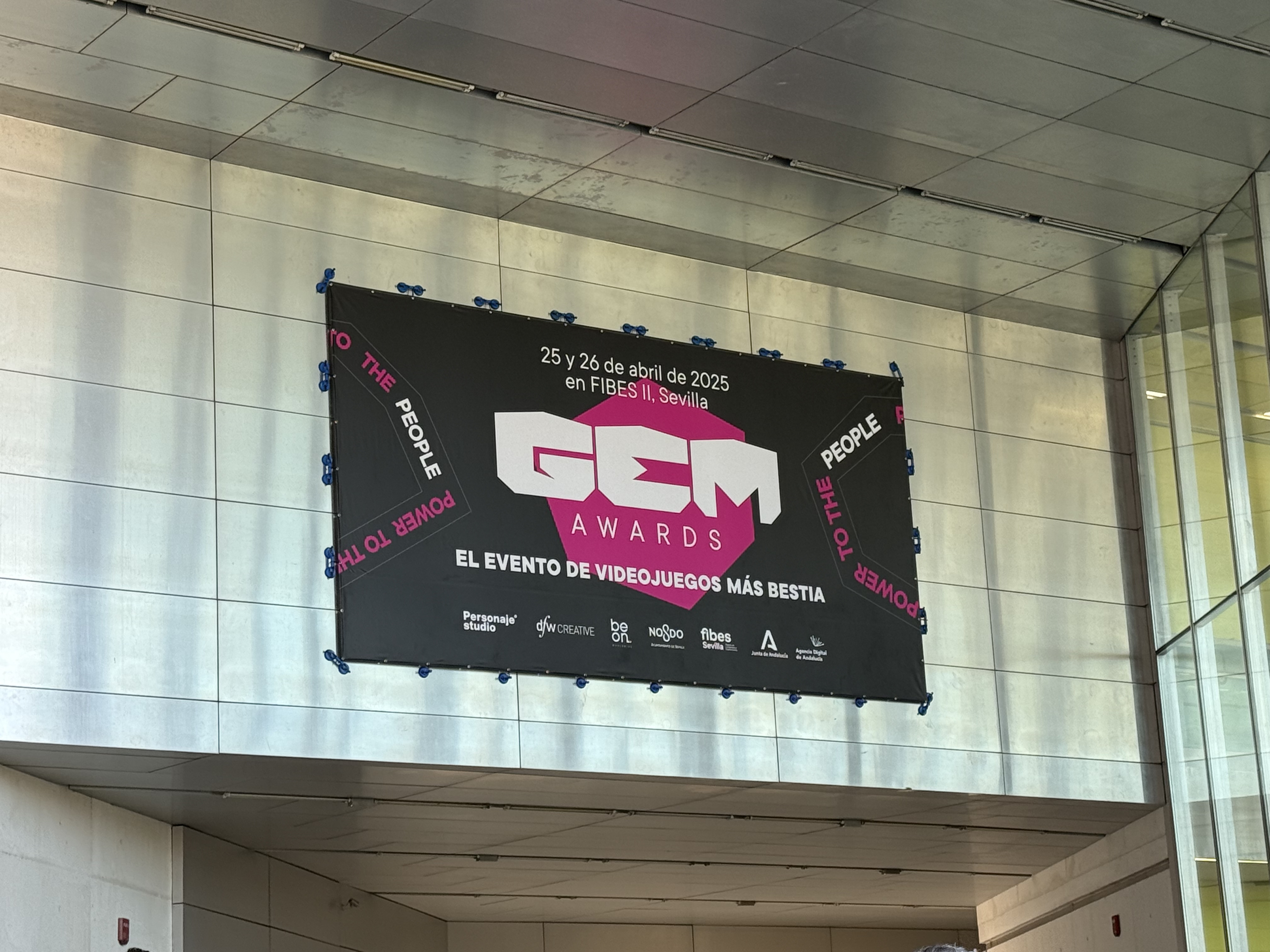
- GEM Awards poster
- Status: Active
- Genre: Video game convention
- Venue: Palacio de Exposiciones y Congresos (FIBES)
- Location: Sevilla
- Coordinates: 37°24′16″N 5°55′57″W
- Country: Spain
- Inaugurated: April 25, 2025; 18 months ago
- Organizer: Junta de Andalucía; Ayuntamiento de Sevilla
- Website: gem-awards.com

GEM Awards is an international video game convention held in Sevilla, which rewards the best video games in 2024 and is formed by fifteen categories, including "La Gema del Año". It was organized by DFW Creative CEO and founder Charina Widjaja, Personaje Studio project manager Pedro David García, and Beon Worldwide marketing director Michelle Sayago. It was revealed in January 2025 at the FITUR trade fair in Madrid.

The first edition took place on 25–26 April 2025 at Palacio de Exposiciones y Congresos de Sevilla (FIBES). It was hosted by Mister Jägger and Maya Pixelskaya, and it had different activities, talks, arcade game area, merchandising, musical performances including Mind Traveller, Z Orquestraand, Alex White, Elesky, Carlos Viola and Noly, which are Blasphemous BSO creators, and also humorous performances by content creators Borja Pavón, Zorman and ZellenDust. It was attended by 4.000 people, and it was also streamed online, where it got more than 450.000 unique viewers.

Among the winners, James Sunderland won Best Character for Silent Hill II, Sephiroth from Final Fantasy VII Rebirth won Best Villain, Concord won Worst Video Game, Astro Bot and Balatro won three awards each, and Black Myth: Wukong won Best Video Game among three other wins.

It became a reference model in the video game industry.

== List of Winners ==
=== 2024 ===
The ceremony was presented in Seville and was held on the 25th and the 26th of April 2025.

Award	Winner
GEM of the Year 2024	Black Myth: Wukong
Best Art Direction	Black Myth: Wukong
Best Debut (New IP)	Black Myth: Wukong
Best Action/Adventure Game	Black Myth: Wukong
Best Game for All Audiences	Astro Bot
Best Platform Game	Astro Bot
Best Exclusive Game (Console)	Astro Bot
GEMA Indie 2024	Balatro
Best Strategy Game	Balatro
Best Mobile Game	Balatro
Best Original Score	Elden Ring Shadow of the Erdtree
Best DLC/Expansion	Elden Ring Shadow of the Erdtree
Best Narrative	Silent Hill 2
Best Remaster/Remake Game	Silent Hill 2
Best Film/TV Adaptation	Arcane (season 2)
Best VR Game	Batman: Arkham Shadow
Anti GEMA 2024	Concord
Best Retro Game 1994	Donkey Kong Country
Best Fighting Game	Dragon Ball: Sparking! Zero
Best Sports Game	EA Sports FC 25
Best Driving/Speed Game	F1 24
Best RPG	Final Fantasy VII Rebirth
Best Game as a Service (Ongoing)	Fortnite
Best Early Access Game	Hades II
Best Shooter Game	Helldivers 2
Best Leading Actor 2024	James Sunderland
Best Spanish/Hispanic American Game	Neva
Best Game as a Service (GAAS) 2024	Pokémon Trading Card Game Pocket
Best Villain 2024	Sephiroth
Best Ecosystem 2024	Windows (Note: "The GEM has been stolen.")
