= Concord (video game) =

Defunct 2024 video game

- Developer: Firewalk Studios
- Publisher: Sony Interactive Entertainment
- Director: Ryan R. Ellis
- Designers: Josh Hamrick; Leif Johansen
- Programmer: Sumeet Jakatdar
- Artist: Adrian Majkrzak
- Writers: Emily Zulauf; James B. Jones; Angela Petrella; Nick Luddington; Christos Gage
- Composer: Daniel Pemberton
- Engine: Unreal Engine 5
- Platforms: PlayStation 5; Windows
- Release: August 23, 2024
- Genre: Hero shooter
- Mode: Multiplayer

Concord was a hero shooter game developed by Firewalk Studios and published by Sony Interactive Entertainment. It was released for PlayStation 5 and Windows on August 23, 2024. Set in a science fiction universe inhabited by coexisting humans and humanoid aliens, the game revolved around multiplayer battles between teams of competing mercenaries.

Concord received mixed reviews from critics. The game experienced unprecedentedly low sales for a project of its size and was shut down on September 6, 2024, two weeks after its launch, with all sold copies being refunded. On October 29, Sony announced the closure of Firewalk Studios and the end of the game's development. Since its shutdown, Concord has been widely considered one of the video game industry's biggest commercial failures.

== Premise ==
In the far future, an area of the galaxy called the Wilds has been isolated by the Tempest, a storm-like phenomenon that destroys anything it touches, and may be expanding. The Wilds are ruled by a mega-corporation called the Guild, which holds monopolies on space travel and commercial agriculture, among other things, and enforces this with a large private military. Defying the Guild is a loose association of smugglers, pirates and mercenaries called Freegunners, who travel space to work for hire. Freegunners help each other against the Guild, but also clash during missions.

== Gameplay ==
Gameplay screenshot of Concord. The map's capture points are depicted as A, B, and C at the top-center of the screen.

Concord was a sci-fi player-versus-player hero shooter video game played from a first-person perspective. The game featured a variety of human and alien characters, each with different abilities, such as robot legs for high jumps and diamond skin for enhanced damage absorption. Teams of five Freegunners fought each other. There were six game modes: Takedown, Trophy Hunt (variants of team deathmatch), Area Control (control points), Signal Hunt, Clash Point (variants of king of the hill), and Cargo Run (similar to steal-the-bacon, with teams competing to retrieve crates from a central area). The initial preview videos revealed five playable characters, and the game released with sixteen. The game was expected to have free post-launch updates that would have added more characters and maps. The game would have published weekly new cutscenes about the characters and storyline.

== Development and release ==
Concord was the only game developed by Firewalk Studios, a studio located in Bellevue, Washington, and founded in 2018. Firewalk initially developed Concord in collaboration with its parent company, ProbablyMonsters, until the studio was acquired by Sony Interactive Entertainment in April 2023. Firewalk Studios announced Concord during the PlayStation Showcase on May 24, 2023, with a CGI trailer. A beta for the game was released in July 2024 to underwhelming player numbers. The game was released for PlayStation 5 and Windows on August 23, 2024.

Designer Jon Weisnewski said the game was in development for around eight years, though Firewalk later stated that the game only entered full production in 2022. According to video game podcast host Colin Moriarty, citing an unnamed Concord developer, the game had development costs of $400 million, although this figure was disputed by several PlayStation developers on social media. Moriarty said the game had been intended as a tentpole title by Sony, who believed it would eventually expand into a major franchise akin to Star Wars. Reportedly, an internal culture of workplace toxic positivity and a belief that it was impossible for the game to fail caused critical feedback to be ignored.

Reacting to the game's reported development cost of $400 million, Christopher Dring, head of GamesIndustry.biz, questioned media reports that took the figure seriously: "No game has that [development] budget. The press reports are the laughing stock of the industry. Concord didn't even get any above-the-line marketing spend." Tom Warren, senior editor of The Verge, agreed the claim was not believable. "I'm amazed but also not amazed that publications have run with this number. You only have to look at ProbablyMonsters's funding to know it's nonsense." Writer and journalist Jason Schreier urged listeners to be skeptical of tightly guarded information that only a few people in high positions would know, originating from a single-source, for "numbers that simply sound absurd." The game was reported to have a budget of $50 million back in 2019.

== Reception ==
=== Critical response ===
Reception

Aggregate scores
Aggregator	Score
Metacritic	(PS5) 62/100 (PC) 65/100
OpenCritic	22% recommend

Review scores
Publication	Score
Digital Trends	3/5
Eurogamer	3/5
GamesRadar+	3/5
Hardcore Gamer	3.5/5
IGN	7/10
PC Gamer (US)	45/100
PCMag	3.5/5
Push Square	7/10
Shacknews	7/10
Video Games Chronicle	3/5

Concord received "mixed or average" reviews from critics, according to review aggregator website Metacritic. On OpenCritic, the game is recommended by 22% of 62 critic reviews. During the 1st GEM Awards, Concord won the award for Anti GEMA 2024, which is otherwise called the Worst Game.

Push Square rated it seven out of ten, and wrote: "Firewalk's debut may not be out of this world, but it's genuinely pretty good overall." Digital Trends rated it three out of five, and wrote: "Concord has the bones of a fun multiplayer game, but it's missing the meat." Video Games Chronicle rated it three out of five, and was critical of the $40 price, advising players to wait until the game was available on PlayStation Plus. Eurogamer rated it three out of five, attributing the rating to the heroes' "muddled" character design, writing: "The heroes seem to be visually either under or overdesigned". Nova Smith of PC Gamer rated Concord 45 out of 100, describing it as "underbaked, overpriced, and dated" while criticizing the game for its "agonizingly slow movement speed", uninspired map design and "forgettable" cast of characters.

=== Sales ===
Upon release, Concord peaked at around 700 simultaneous players on Steam. Will Nelson of PCGamesN noted that compared to Helldivers 2, a multiplayer game released by Sony in the same year, Concord's player count was much lower than the 400,000 Steam players Helldivers 2 attracted at launch. Nelson attributed Concord's poor performance to a lack of originality and a high price tag while competing in a heavily saturated market dominated by free-to-play games like Overwatch 2 and Valorant.

On August 29, one week after launch, the game had 162 simultaneous players on Steam. It was estimated that less than a week after release, the game had sold a total of around 25,000 units, with sales of 10,000 on Steam and 15,000 on PlayStation. Due to the magnitude of its commercial failure, it is cited by various publications, including The Guardian, PC Gamer, ComicBook.com, and Insider Gaming, as one of the biggest failures in video game history.

== Shutdown ==
On September 3, Sony announced that Concord would be taken offline and that all copies of the game that had been sold up to that point would be refunded, citing that "aspects of the game and our initial launch didn't land the way we'd intended" and that they would "explore options, including those that will better reach our players". The game was delisted from digital storefronts, and the game's servers went offline just after 17:00 (UTC) on September 6, 2024.

The swift shutdown was attributed to several factors, including Concord's failure to differentiate itself from established hero shooter games like Overwatch and Apex Legends, its lack of innovative gameplay mechanics, its unappealing character roster, and its poor map design. The game also faced criticism for being a full-priced release in a genre where most competitors are free-to-play, as well as its eight-year development cycle making it feel outdated upon release, with it struggling to align with evolving market trends and player expectations.

Due to the commercial failure of the game, its game director Ryan Ellis announced to Firewalk's staff that he would be stepping down from his game director role and moving into a support role instead. In October 2024, Sony shut down the game permanently and closed Firewalk Studios. This made Concord the second shortest-living online game to date, eclipsed only by the eight-day service life of The Culling 2.

== Legacy ==
In May 2025, a commemorative release plaque from developer "Chelsea Grace" was given to a Goodwill, and was put up for auction. It is unknown if "Grace" donated the plaque themself or if it was given to the store by a third party. In June 2025, a development build of Concord was leaked online, dated November 14, 2023 – nine months before the game's release. The leaker provided an INI file to bypass a mandatory login screen, but the game still remains mostly inaccessible aside from certain menus.

Fans of the game attempted to reverse engineer the online services for Concord, and had announced some initial progress by November 2025. Shortly after this, Sony sent DMCA takedown requests to the team's videos on social media, leading the team to pause further public involvement at the time. People have humorously compared other live-service games like Highguard to Concord over their similar commercial failures.

== In other media ==
The Amazon Prime Video anthology series Secret Level features an episode adapting Concord, titled "Concord: Tale of the Implacable", depicting the founders of the Freegunner faction. Despite the game's shutdown, the episode was released as scheduled on December 17, 2024.
