= Abby (streamer) =

Spanish Twitch streamer

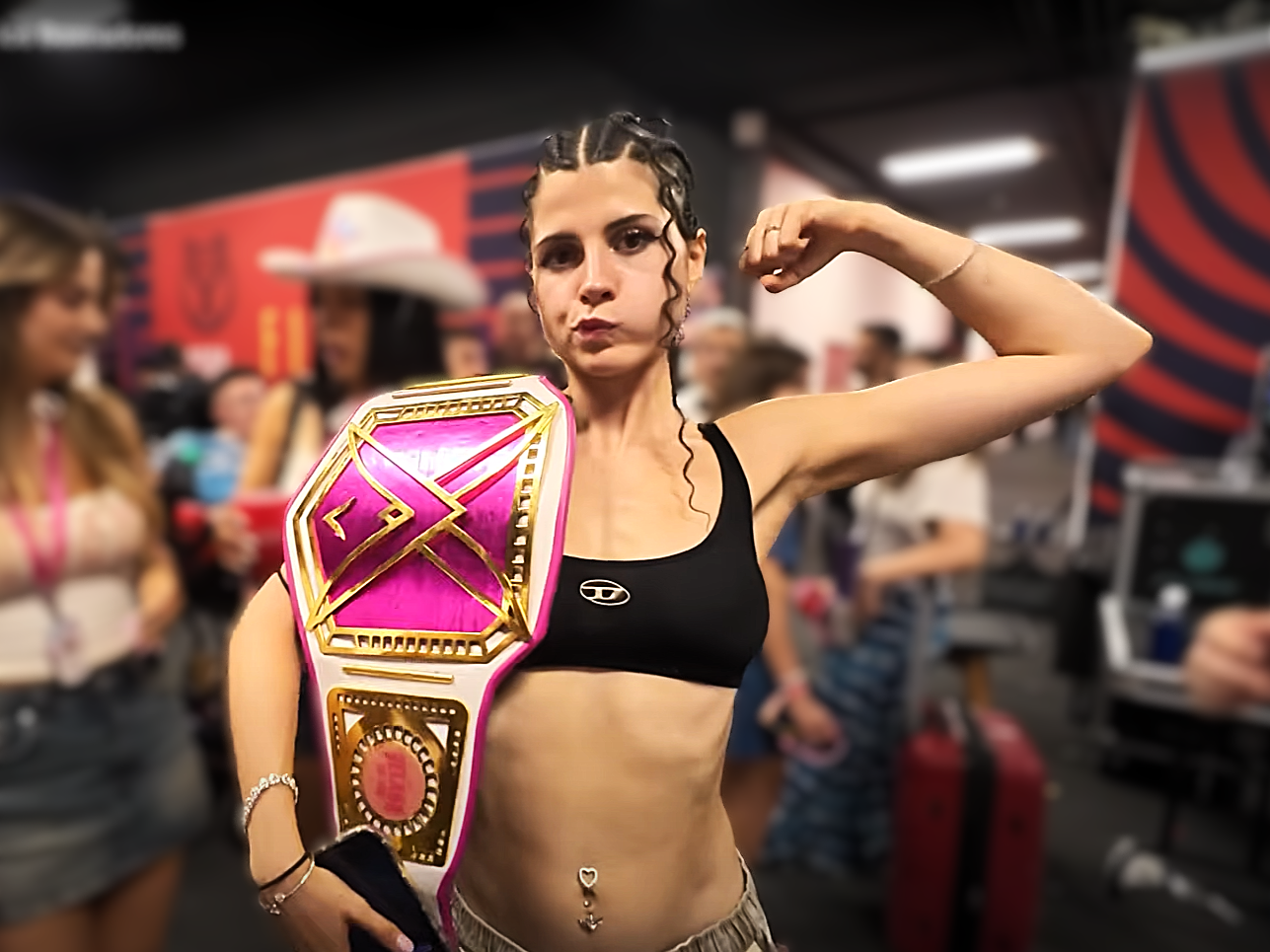
- Abby during La Velada del Año 5 in 2025
- Born: Abril Gené Capriles; 28 December 2000 (age 25); Palma de Mallorca
- Occupation: Twitch streamer

Twitch information
- Channel: abby_
- Years active: 2016–present
- Genre: Gaming
- Followers: 671 thousand

Abril Gené Capriles, known as Abby and previously as LittleRagerGirl, is a Spanish Twitch streamer.

She was born in 2000 in Palma de Mallorca, and then she moved to Andorra. She began her streaming career in 2016.

She is one of the main Twitch streamers in Spain, and she plays League of Legends. In 2022 she won the Twitch competition named "El último en pie", in which she got 30.000 euros.

After 6 years in GiantX, she joined esports club Team Heretics in 2025. On 26 July she fought at La Velada del Año 5 against Roro, in which she won. In December she won the Best Creator Content Award at 3DJuegos Lenovo 2025.

In 2019 she dated Orslok and then she was in a relationship with Twitch streamer Karchez.
