= Black Myth: Zhong Kui =

Upcoming video game

- Developer: Game Science
- Series: Black Myth
- Platforms: PC and consoles
- Genre: Action role-playing
- Mode: Single-player

Black Myth: Zhong Kui (Note: Simplified Chinese: 黑神话：钟馗; traditional Chinese: 黑神話：鍾馗; pinyin: Hēishénhuà: Zhōng Kuí.) is an upcoming action role-playing game developed by the Chinese studio Game Science.

Black Myth: Zhong Kui is scheduled to be released for PC and consoles. It will be the second installment in the Black Myth series, following Black Myth: Wukong. Its release date has not been announced yet.

== Gameplay ==
Black Myth: Zhong Kui is an action role-playing game. It is played in single-player mode.

== Synopsis ==
Black Myth: Zhong Kui is a game rooted in Chinese mythology and folklore. It draws its primary creative inspiration from Zhong Kui, a Chinese folk figure. It is set against the backdrop of "Zhong Kui Banishing Evil", a classic Chinese folktale.

Geoff Keighley, who presented the game's reveal at Gamescom Opening Night Live 2025, said that the game stars Zhong Kui, the "ghost-catching god who wanders between Hell and Earth".

The game's central theme is life and death.

== Development ==
Black Myth: Zhong Kui is a game developed by Game Science. Its development started in June 2025.

On the decision to begin the development of Black Myth: Zhong Kui, Feng Ji expressed that it stemmed from a desire to freely and boldly create a completely new title in the Black Myth series. He noted that although he and the rest of the team were working on a DLC for Black Myth: Wukong, he found himself stuck in a haze following the release of that game, a project that he envisioned for nearly twenty years and one that greatly exceeded expectations. He said that in 2025, he raised the idea to make an entirely new game instead to Yang Qi and other colleagues.

In August 2026, Game Science released a trailer offering an early 15-minute look at the gameplay and story, all captured from a work-in-progress build.

== Release ==
Black Myth: Zhong Kui is scheduled to be released for PC and consoles. It is the second installment in the Black Myth series.

Game Science unveiled Black Myth: Zhong Kui with a trailer during Gamescom Opening Night Live on 19 August 2025. The studio stated that the announcement was made to inform everyone about the start of a new project, in keeping with its tradition to report on progress to players every 20 August. (Note: Adjusted for China Standard Time, the announcement took place on 20 August 2025.)

== Reception ==
=== Accolades ===
| Ceremony | Category | Result | Ref. |
|---|---|---|---|
| Ultra Game Awards 2025 | Surprise of the Year | Won | |
| The 44th Annual Golden Joystick Awards | Most Wanted Game | Nominated | |
