= Xi County, Shanxi =

Coordinates: 36°42′42″N 111°00′00″E

Xi County 隰县
- County
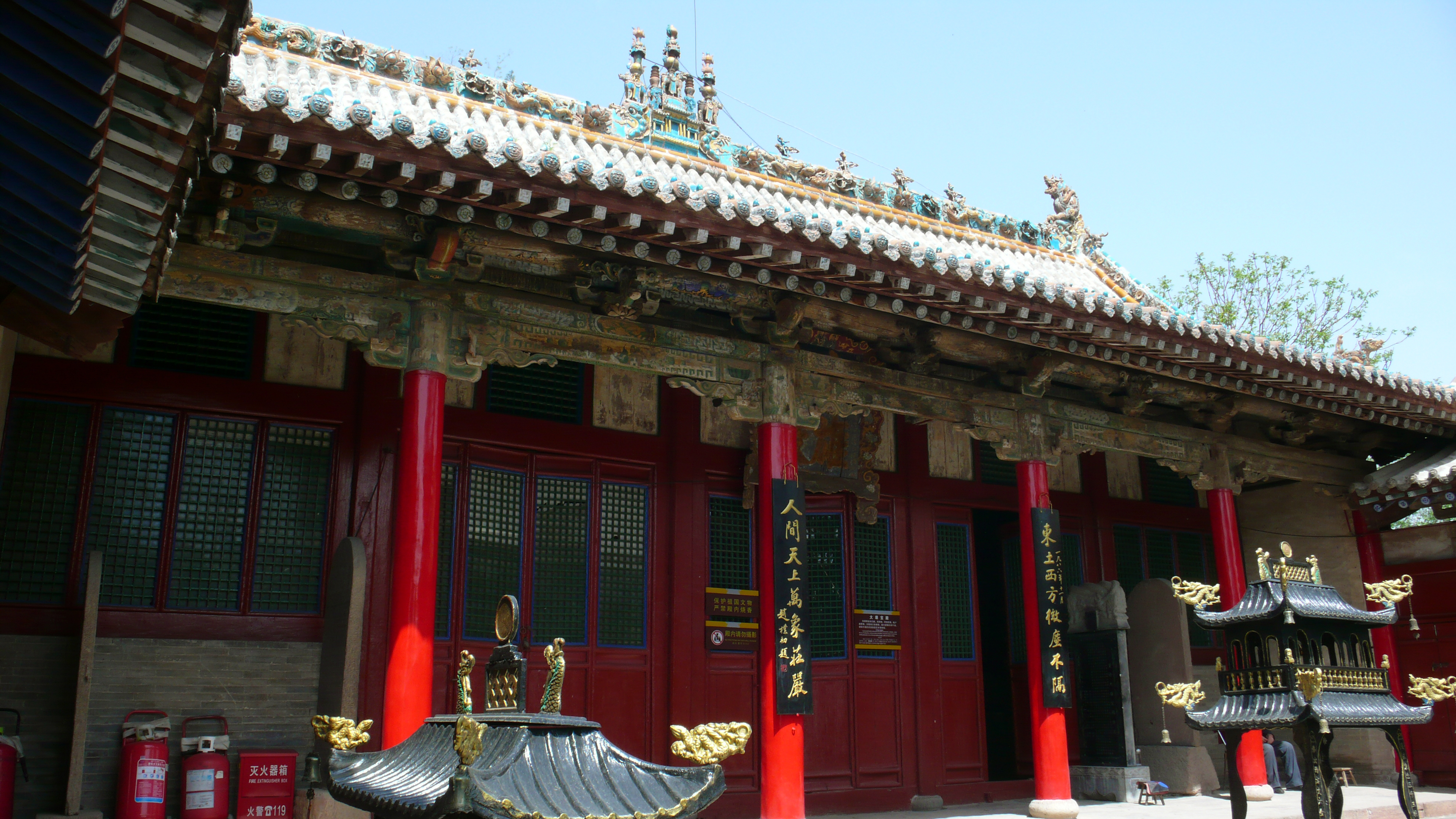
- Daxiong Hall, Xiaoxitian, Xi County

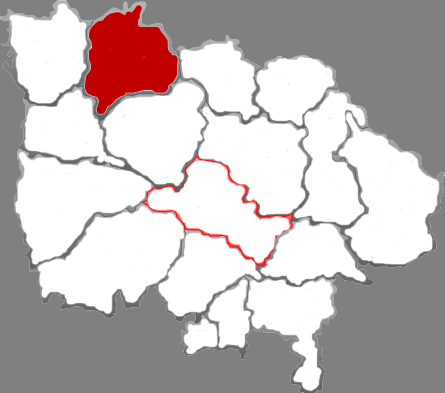
- Xi County in Linfen

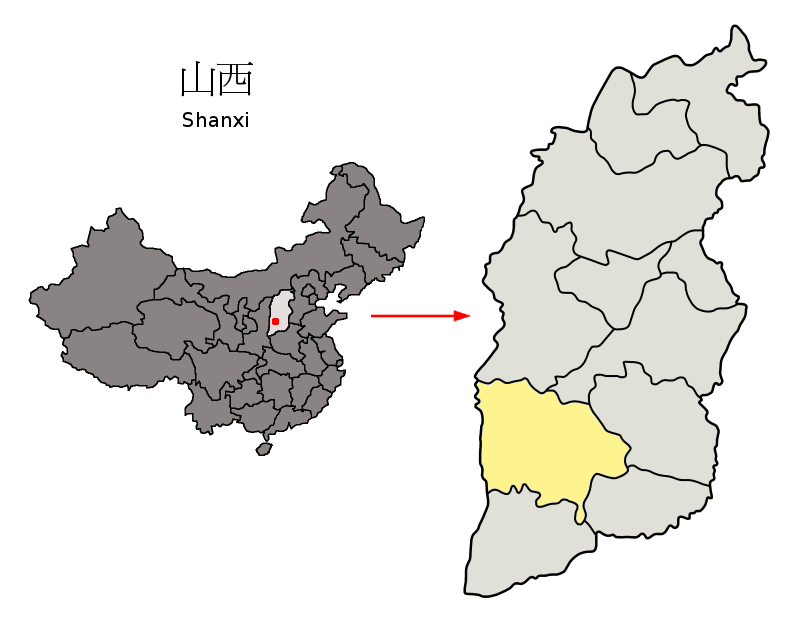
- Linfen in Shanxi
- Country: People's Republic of China
- Province: Shanxi
- Prefecture-level city: Linfen

Area
  - Total: 1,413 km^{2} (546 sq mi)

Population (2010)
  - Total: 103,617
  - Density: 73.33/km^{2} (189.9/sq mi)
- Time zone: UTC+8 (China Standard)

Xi County or Xixian (simplified Chinese: 隰县; traditional Chinese: 隰縣; pinyin: Xī Xiàn) is a county in the southwest of Shanxi province, China. It is located in the northwest of the administrative area of the prefecture-level city of Linfen. The county spans an area of 1,413 square kilometres (546 mi^{2}), and according to the 2010 Chinese census, Xi County had a population of 103,617.

== Toponymy ==
The county was named after a definition in the ancient Chinese dictionary Erya which stated "that which is wet shall be called xi" (simplified Chinese: 下湿曰隰; traditional Chinese: 下濕曰隰; pinyin: xià shī yuē xí), in reference to the county's wet period during the spring.

== History ==
During the Han dynasty, the area was organized as Puzi County (simplified Chinese: 蒲子县; traditional Chinese: 蒲子縣; pinyin: Púzi Xiàn).

Under the Northern Wei, the northern portion of present-day Xi County was organized as part of Tujing Commandery, and the southern portion was part of Pingchang County (simplified Chinese: 平昌县; traditional Chinese: 平昌縣; pinyin: Píngchāng Xiàn).

In 579 CE, the Northern Zhou established Changshou County (simplified Chinese: 长寿县; traditional Chinese: 長壽縣; pinyin: Chángshòu Xiàn) in the area, under the jurisdiction of Longquan Commandery.

In 585 CE, the area was reorganized as Xi Zhou, which existed on and off until the area was reorganized as Xichuan County (simplified Chinese: 隰川县; traditional Chinese: 隰川縣; pinyin: Xíchuān Xiàn) in the mid 14th century.

In 1912, the area was reorganized as Xi County, as it is today, belonging to Hedong Circuit.

Under the People's Republic of China, the county was under the jurisdiction of Jinnan Prefecture, until it was reorganized as Linfen in 1970.

== Geography ==
The county is located on the western edge of the Lüliang Mountains, with an average elevation ranging from 950 metres (3,120 ft) to 1,300 metres (4,300 ft) above sea level. Xi County's highest point is 1,953 metres (6,407 ft) above sea level.

The Xinshui River, a tributary of the Yellow River, flows through the county.

== Climate ==
Climate data for Xixian, elevation 1,053 m (3,455 ft), (1991–2020 normals, extremes 1981–present)
Month	Jan	Feb	Mar	Apr	May	Jun	Jul	Aug	Sep	Oct	Nov	Dec	Year
Record high °C (°F)	17.0 (62.6)	22.6 (72.7)	28.6 (83.5)	35.2 (95.4)	36.4 (97.5)	38.1 (100.6)	38.5 (101.3)	37.5 (99.5)	36.4 (97.5)	28.3 (82.9)	23.9 (75.0)	16.0 (60.8)	38.5 (101.3)
Mean daily maximum °C (°F)	1.6 (34.9)	6.0 (42.8)	12.5 (54.5)	19.8 (67.6)	24.9 (76.8)	28.8 (83.8)	29.6 (85.3)	27.8 (82.0)	23.1 (73.6)	17.1 (62.8)	9.9 (49.8)	2.9 (37.2)	17.0 (62.6)
Daily mean °C (°F)	−5.8 (21.6)	−1.5 (29.3)	4.9 (40.8)	12.0 (53.6)	17.3 (63.1)	21.5 (70.7)	23.1 (73.6)	21.4 (70.5)	16.3 (61.3)	9.8 (49.6)	2.6 (36.7)	−4.1 (24.6)	9.8 (49.6)
Mean daily minimum °C (°F)	−10.8 (12.6)	−6.8 (19.8)	−1.0 (30.2)	5.2 (41.4)	10.2 (50.4)	14.9 (58.8)	17.8 (64.0)	16.5 (61.7)	11.3 (52.3)	4.5 (40.1)	−2.3 (27.9)	−8.9 (16.0)	4.2 (39.6)
Record low °C (°F)	−23.6 (−10.5)	−20.7 (−5.3)	−15.6 (3.9)	−8.4 (16.9)	0.3 (32.5)	5.6 (42.1)	11.0 (51.8)	8.1 (46.6)	0.0 (32.0)	−7.7 (18.1)	−19.0 (−2.2)	−24.2 (−11.6)	−24.2 (−11.6)
Average precipitation mm (inches)	4.6 (0.18)	6.9 (0.27)	11.1 (0.44)	29.8 (1.17)	38.6 (1.52)	54.9 (2.16)	111.1 (4.37)	113.5 (4.47)	69.7 (2.74)	38.1 (1.50)	17.3 (0.68)	3.6 (0.14)	499.2 (19.64)
Average precipitation days (≥ 0.1 mm)	2.8	3.4	4.5	6.0	7.8	9.3	12.7	11.2	9.1	7.3	4.5	2.6	81.2
Average snowy days	4.2	4.7	3.1	0.5	0	0	0	0	0	0.2	2.6	3.7	19
Average relative humidity (%)	53	50	45	44	48	55	68	72	71	66	59	54	57
Mean monthly sunshine hours	188.6	176.2	210.9	233.9	253.3	235.2	219.8	205.2	184.9	195.1	182.5	188.1	2,473.7
Percentage possible sunshine	61	57	57	59	58	54	50	50	50	57	60	63	56
Source: China Meteorological Administration

== Administrative divisions ==
Xi County administers three towns and five townships.

=== Towns ===
The county's three towns are Longquan, Wucheng, and Huangtu.

=== Townships ===
The county's five townships are Yangtousheng Township, Zhaizi Township, Duopo Township, Xiali Township, and Chengnan Township.

== Demographics ==
The county's population per the 2010 Chinese census was 103,617, up from the 95,895 reported in the 2000 Chinese census. In 1999, the county's population was estimated to be 97,758.

== Little West Paradise ==
The most famous cultural relic in Xi County is Xiaoxitian (小西天), also known as Little Western Paradise and Qianfo'an (千佛庵). It is a Chan Buddhist temple located atop Fenghuang Mountain in the west side of Xi County. The temple was founded by the Chan Master Dongming in 1629, during the Ming dynasty. It was originally named Qianfo'an due to the presence of a thousand Buddha statues in the Mahavira Hall. Later, the temple was renamed Xiaoxitian to distinguish it from another Ming dynasty temple, Daxitian (Great Western Heaven) located south of the city, and because the temple's plaque was inscribed with the words "Dao Ru Xitian" (道入西天; The Way Leads to the Western Heaven).

Xiaoxitian covers an area of over 1,100 square meters and includes various structures such as the Mahavira Hall, Manjusri Hall, Samantabhadra Hall, Amitabha Hall, Hall of Heavenly Kings, Weituo Hall, Ksitigarbha Hall, a bell tower, and a drum tower. The temple complex is divided into upper, middle, and front courtyards by a series of corridors, with two-thirds of its halls being double-story structures. The temple's suspended sculptures and colorful paintings are of significant scholarly interest for the study of Ming and Qing dynasty art.

On March 5, 2013, Xiaoxitian was designated as a National Key Cultural Relics Protection Unit by the State Council of China as part of the fourth batch of such sites.
