= CAA Art Museum =

- Chinese: 中国美术学院美术馆; CAA Art Museum
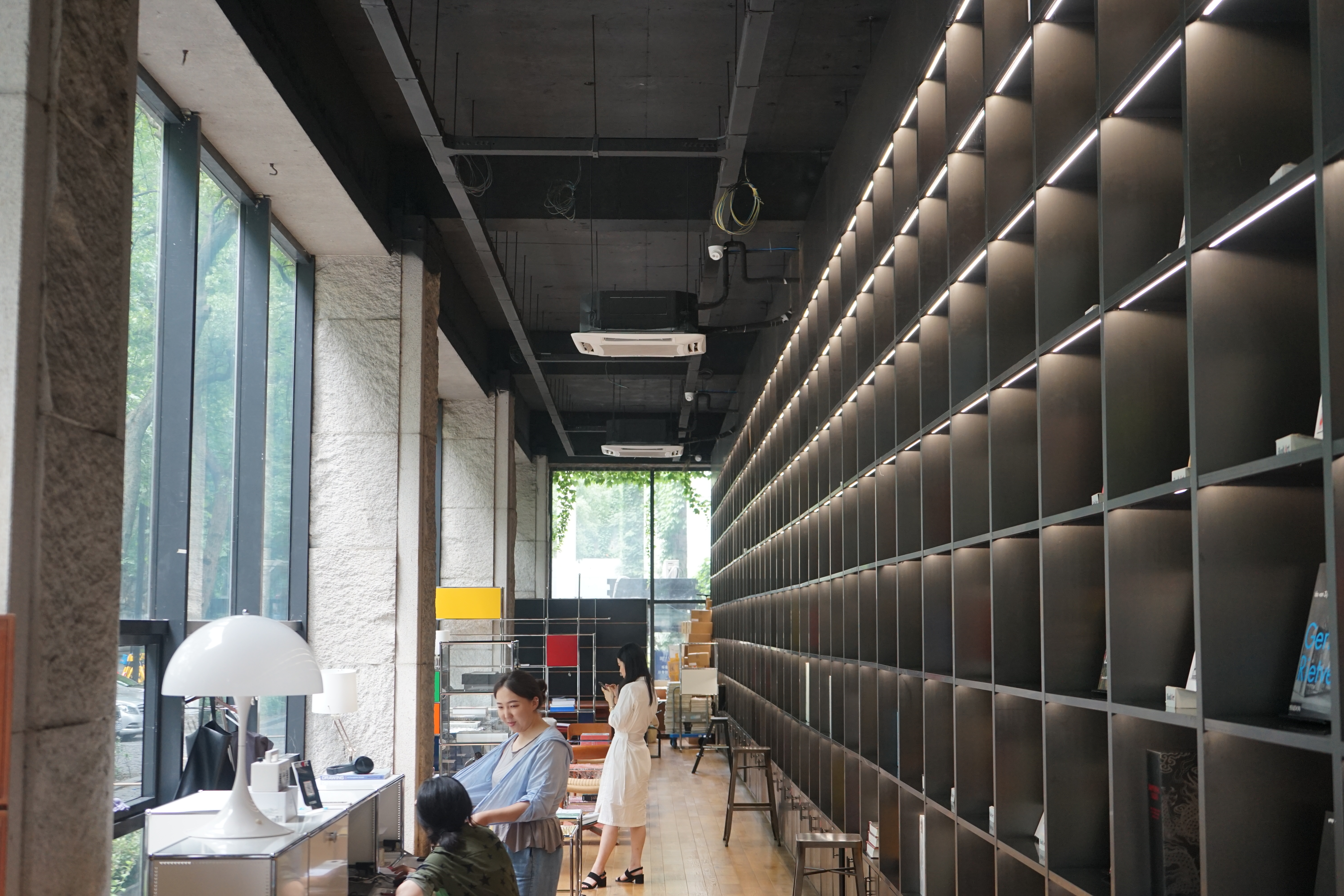

- Location within Zhejiang Location within China
- Established: 1935 (91 years ago)
- Location: 218 Nanshan Rd, Shangcheng District, Hangzhou, Zhejiang, China
- Coordinates: 30°14′40″N 120°09′17″E
- Type: Art Museum
- Chairperson: Hang Jian
- Public transit access: Hangzhou Metro Dingan Road Station
- Website: 中国美术学院美术馆

CAA Art Museum (CAAM) (simplified Chinese: 中国美术学院美术馆; traditional Chinese: 中國美術學院美術館; pinyin: Zhōngguó měishù xuéyuàn měishùguǎn), is an art museum affiliated to China Art Academy (CAA) in Hangzhou, Zhejiang, China. Despite its history dating back to 1935, the Museum became open to the public in 2003 after its building was reconstructed. Now, the museum comprises three sub-museum, including the Art Museum, the Design Museum and the Folk Crafts Museum. In 2015, the museum was listed among the 13 key art museums of China by the Ministry of Culture.

== History ==
The history of the museum can date back to 1935 when a Russian professor, whose name was Dufei (杜飞) in Chinese, designed and supervised the construction of a gallery for the academy at a total cost of 30,000 Silver Yuan. The gallery replaced where used to be the Zhaodan Platform (照胆台) and Sanxian Temple (三贤祠) near the West Lake and was one of the best gallery in China at that time. In 1949, it held the first National Exhibition of Fine Arts.

In 2003, the building of the museum on Nanshan Road was rebuilt and renamed to Art Museum. Since then, it became open to the public and over 500 exhibitions have been held in the building. In 2015, the Folk Crafts Museum, one of the sub-museum of the CAA Art Museum, which focused on ethnic and folk arts, located in Xiangshan Campus came into use. In 2017, China Design Museum, another sub-museum, became open to the public.

== See also ==
- China Academy of Art
