= 21st British Academy Games Awards =

Game award ceremony in 2025

- Date: 8 April 2025
- Location: Queen Elizabeth Hall
- Hosted by: Phil Wang
- Best Game: Astro Bot
- Most awards: Astro Bot (5)
- Most nominations: Senua's Saga: Hellblade II (11)

The 21st British Academy Video Game Awards were hosted by the British Academy of Film and Television Arts on 8 April 2025 to honour the best video games of 2024. Held at the Queen Elizabeth Hall in London, the ceremony was hosted by comedian Phil Wang for the second time following his debut at the previous ceremony. Nominations were announced on 4 March 2025, with Ninja Theory's psychological action-adventure game Senua's Saga: Hellblade II earning a leading eleven nominations, followed by platformer Astro Bot and horror game Still Wakes the Deep, both with eight nominations respectively. Astro Bot received the most awards on the night, winning five, followed by Still Wakes the Deep with three wins, and multiplayer shooter game Helldivers 2 with two wins. The BAFTA Fellowship was presented to Japanese composer Yoko Shimomura.

The ceremony was opened with a performance by Peredur ap Gwynedd, and also featured the live debut of "I Can't Hear It Now" from the Arcane League of Legends: Season 2 soundtrack performed by Freya Ridings.

== Background ==
=== Eligibility ===
Any game released between 25 November 2023 and 15 November 2024 was eligible for nomination.

=== Awards changes ===
For the 21st BAFTA Games Awards, the following changes were announced:

- All eligible entered games will be automatically considered for Best Game and British Game, which were previously opt-in categories.
- British Game entrants will be required to answer a set of questions designed to address diversity & inclusion and bullying & harassment in the UK games industry. This work will support the BFI Diversity Standards for Games and build on BAFTA’s long-standing work to help tackle bullying and harassment across the screen industries, as part of BAFTA's wider, ongoing collective cross-sector activity.
- The criteria for New Intellectual Property has been amended to take into consideration the originality and innovation of entered games.
- The criteria for Evolving Game has been amended. From 2024, only games with a roadmap for substantial future updates are eligible in this category.

=== Longlist ===
On 10 December 2024, BAFTA released their official longlist, featuring fifty-eight games. The longlist for the Best Game was revealed for the first time, revealing which ten games were in contention to be nominated for the top prize.

20th BAFTA Games Awards Longlist
- Animation: Astro Bot, Call of Duty: Black Ops 6, Dragon Age: The Veilguard, Harold Halibut, Helldivers 2, Lego Horizon Adventures, Prince of Persia: The Lost Crown, Senua's Saga: Hellblade II, Thank Goodness You're Here!, Warhammer 40,000: Space Marine 2
- Artistic Achievement: Animal Well, Astro Bot, Black Myth: Wukong, Final Fantasy VII Rebirth, Harold Halibut, Metaphor: ReFantazio, Neva, Senua's Saga: Hellblade II, Still Wakes the Deep, Thank Goodness You're Here!
- Audio Achievement: Animal Well, Astro Bot, Black Myth: Wukong, Call of Duty: Black Ops 6, Final Fantasy VII Rebirth, Helldivers 2, Metaphor: ReFantazio, Senua's Saga: Hellblade II, Star Wars Outlaws, Still Wakes the Deep
- Best Game: Animal Well, Astro Bot, Balatro, Black Myth: Wukong, Call of Duty: Black Ops 6, Helldivers 2, The Legend of Zelda: Echoes of Wisdom, Metaphor: ReFantazio, Thank Goodness You're Here!, Warhammer 40,000: Space Marine 2
- British Game: Botany Manor, Crow Country, F1 24, A Highland Song, Lego Horizon Adventures, Paper Trail, Planet Coaster 2, Senua's Saga: Hellblade II, Still Wakes the Deep, Thank Goodness You're Here!
- Debut Game: Animal Well, Balatro, Botany Manor, Harold Halibut, Little Kitty, Big City, Pacific Drive, The Plucky Squire, Tales of Kenzera: Zau, Thank Goodness You're Here!, Tiny Glade
- Evolving Game: Baldur's Gate 3, Diablo IV, Factorio, Final Fantasy XI Online, HITMAN World of Assassination, Minecraft, No Man's Sky, Sea of Thieves, Vampire Survivors, World of Warcraft
- Family: Animal Well, Astro Bot, Cat Quest III, EA Sports FC 25, The Legend of Zelda: Echoes of Wisdom, Lego Horizon Adventures, Little Kitty, Big City, Planet Coaster 2, The Plucky Squire, Super Mario Party Jamboree
- Game Beyond Entertainment: Botany Manor, Frostpunk 2, Indika, Kind Words 2, Life Is Strange: Double Exposure, Llamasoft: The Jeff Minter Story, Senua's Saga: Hellblade II, Tales of Kenzera: Zau, Tetris Forever, Vampire Therapist
- Game Design: Animal Well, Astro Bot, Balatro, Helldivers 2, The Legend of Zelda: Echoes of Wisdom, Metaphor: ReFantazio, Pacific Drive, Tactical Breach Wizards, UFO 50, Warhammer 40,000: Space Marine 2
- Multiplayer: Call of Duty: Black Ops 6, EA Sports FC 25, Helldivers 2, Lego Horizon Adventures, Star Wars: Hunters, Super Mario Party Jamboree, Tekken 8, UFO 50, V Rising, Warhammer 40,000: Space Marine 2
- Music: Astro Bot, Balatro, Black Myth: Wukong, Call of Duty: Black Ops 6, Dragon Age: The Veilguard, Final Fantasy VII Rebirth, Helldivers 2, Metaphor: ReFantazio, Senua's Saga: Hellblade II, Star Wars Outlaws
- Narrative: Black Myth: Wukong, Call of Duty: Black Ops 6, Dragon Age: The Veilguard, Final Fantasy VII Rebirth, Helldivers 2, Life Is Strange: Double Exposure, Metaphor: ReFantazio, Pacific Drive, Senua's Saga: Hellblade II, Still Wakes the Deep
- New Intellectual Property: Animal Well, Balatro, Black Myth: Wukong, Little Kitty, Big City, Metaphor: ReFantazio, Pacific Drive, The Plucky Squire, Stellar Blade, Still Wakes the Deep, Thank Goodness You're Here!
- Technical Achievement: Astro Bot, Batman: Arkham Shadow, Black Myth: Wukong, Call of Duty: Black Ops 6, Final Fantasy VII Rebirth, Helldivers 2, Senua's Saga: Hellblade II, Silent Hill 2, Tiny Glade, Warhammer 40,000: Space Marine 2
- Performer in a Leading Role: Roger Craig Smith (Batman: Arkham Shadow), Alec Newman (Still Wakes the Deep), Cody Christian (Final Fantasy VII Rebirth), Isabella Inchbald (Indika), Luke Roberts (Silent Hill 2), Humberly González (Star Wars Outlaws), Clive Standen (Warhammer 40,000: Space Marine 2), Em Humble (Thank Goodness You're Here!), Melina Juergens (Senua's Saga: Hellblade II), Y'lan Noel (Call of Duty: Black Ops 6)
- Performer in a Supporting Role: Aldís Amah Hamilton (Senua's Saga: Hellblade II), John Eric Bentley (Final Fantasy VII Rebirth), John Blyth (Thank Goodness You're Here!), Michael Abubakar (Still Wakes the Deep), Adam Macnamara (Warhammer 40,000: Space Marine 2), Karen Dunbar (Still Wakes the Deep), Troy Baker (Batman: Arkham Shadow), Matt Berry (Thank Goodness You're Here!), Craig Lee Thomas (Helldivers 2), Abbi Greenland & Helen Goalen (Senua's Saga: Hellblade II)

=== Fellowship ===
Japanese composer Yoko Shimomura, known for her work on the at Capcom and Square Enix, and notably as the composer of the Kingdom Hearts series, was announced as the recipient of the BAFTA Fellowship on 31 March 2025. In a statement, BAFTA CEO Jane Millichip explained, "It is a real privilege to honour Yoko Shimomura with the BAFTA Fellowship this year, a pioneer in video game music, pianist and composer, Yoko has created unforgettable soundtracks for so many beloved games and paved the way for women in the industry at a time when it was overwhelmingly male-dominated. Her groundbreaking work has already inspired countless artists and will continue to resonate for generations."

== Winners and nominees ==
The nominees were announced on 4 March 2025 via a livestream on the official BAFTA YouTube channel hosted by journalist Ali Plumb.

Best Game (presented by Leslie Benzies): Astro Bot – Team Asobi/Sony Interactive Entertainment; Balatro – LocalThunk; Black Myth: Wukong – Game Science; Helldivers 2 – Arrowhead/Sony Interactive Entertainment; The Legend of Zelda: Echoes of Wisdom – Nintendo/Grezzo; Thank Goodness You're Here! – Coal Supper/Panic
Animation (presented by Oliver Parsons and Anna Demetriou): Astro Bot – Team Asobi/Sony Interactive Entertainment; Call of Duty: Black Ops 6 – Treyarch/Raven/Activision; Lego Horizon Adventures – Guerrilla/Studio Gobo; Senua's Saga: Hellblade II – Ninja Theory/Xbox Game Studios; Thank Goodness You're Here! – Coal Supper/Panic; Warhammer 40,000: Space Marine 2 – Saber Interactive/Focus Entertainment	Artistic Achievement (presented by Ashly Burch): Neva – Nomada Studio/Devolver Digital; Astro Bot – Team Asobi/Sony Interactive Entertainment; Black Myth: Wukong – Game Science; Harold Halibut – Slow Bros; Senua's Saga: Hellblade II – Ninja Theory/Xbox Game Studios; Still Wakes the Deep – The Chinese Room/Secret Mode
Audio Achievement (presented by Gabriel Luna and Isabela Merced): Astro Bot – Team Asobi/Sony Interactive Entertainment; Animal Well – Shared Memory/Bigmode; Helldivers 2 – Arrowhead/Sony Interactive Entertainment; Senua's Saga: Hellblade II – Ninja Theory/Xbox Game Studios; Star Wars Outlaws – Massive Entertainment/Ubisoft; Still Wakes the Deep – The Chinese Room/Secret Mode	British Game (presented by Susan Wokoma): Thank Goodness You're Here! – Coal Supper/Panic; A Highland Song – Inkle; Lego Horizon Adventures – Guerrilla/Studio Gobo; Paper Trail – Newfangled Games; Senua's Saga: Hellblade II – Ninja Theory/Xbox Game Studios; Still Wakes the Deep – The Chinese Room/Secret Mode
Debut Game (presented by Jodie Campbell and Aruna Jalloh): Balatro – LocalThunk; Animal Well – Shared Memory/Bigmode; Pacific Drive – Ironwood Studios/Kepler Interactive; The Plucky Squire – All Possible Futures/Devolver Digital; Tales of Kenzera: Zau – Surgent Studios/Electronic Arts; Thank Goodness You're Here! – Coal Supper/Panic	Evolving Game (presented by Elz the Witch): Vampire Survivors – Poncle; Diablo IV – Blizzard Entertainment; Final Fantasy XIV – Square Enix; No Man's Sky – Hello Games; Sea of Thieves – Rare/Xbox Game Studios; World of Warcraft – Blizzard Entertainment
Family (presented by Suzi Ruffell): Astro Bot – Team Asobi/Sony Interactive Entertainment; Cat Quest III – The Gentlebros/Kepler Interactive; Lego Horizon Adventures – Guerrilla/Studio Gobo; Little Kitty, Big City – Double Dagger Studio; The Plucky Squire – All Possible Futures/Devolver Digital; Super Mario Party Jamboree – Nintendo Cube	Game Beyond Entertainment (presented by Tom McKay): Tales of Kenzera: Zau – Surgent Studios/Electronic Arts; Botany Manor – Balloon Studios/Whitethorn Games; Kind Words 2 – Popcannibal; Senua's Saga: Hellblade II – Ninja Theory/Xbox Game Studios; Tetris Forever – Digital Eclipse; Vampire Therapist – Little Bat Games
Game Design (presented by Matthew Lewis): Astro Bot – Team Asobi/Sony Interactive Entertainment; Animal Well – Shared Memory/Bigmode; Balatro – LocalThunk; Helldivers 2 – Arrowhead/Sony Interactive Entertainment; The Legend of Zelda: Echoes of Wisdom – Nintendo/Grezzo; Tactical Breach Wizards – Suspicious Developments	Multiplayer (presented by Adam Pearson and Ali Plumb): Helldivers 2 – Arrowhead/Sony Interactive Entertainment; Call of Duty: Black Ops 6 – Treyarch/Raven/Activision; Lego Horizon Adventures – Guerrilla/Studio Gobo; Super Mario Party Jamboree – Nintendo Cube; Tekken 8 – Bandai Namco/Arika; Warhammer 40,000: Space Marine 2 – Saber Interactive/Focus Entertainment
Music (presented by Talia Mar): Helldivers 2 – Arrowhead/Sony Interactive Entertainment; Astro Bot – Team Asobi/Sony Interactive Entertainment; Black Myth: Wukong – Game Science; Final Fantasy VII Rebirth – Square Enix; Senua's Saga: Hellblade II – Ninja Theory/Xbox Game Studios; Star Wars Outlaws – Massive Entertainment/Ubisoft	Narrative (presented by Neil Newbon): Metaphor: ReFantazio – Studio Zero/Sega; Black Myth: Wukong – Game Science; Dragon Age: The Veilguard – BioWare/Electronic Arts; Final Fantasy VII Rebirth – Square Enix; Senua's Saga: Hellblade II – Ninja Theory/Xbox Game Studios; Still Wakes the Deep – The Chinese Room/Secret Mode
New Intellectual Property (presented by Anjali Bhimani): Still Wakes the Deep – The Chinese Room/Secret Mode; Animal Well – Shared Memory/Bigmode; Balatro – LocalThunk; Black Myth: Wukong – Game Science; Metaphor: ReFantazio – Studio Zero/Sega; Thank Goodness You're Here! – Coal Supper/Panic	Performer in a Leading Role (presented by Adjoa Andoh): Alec Newman as Cameron "Caz" McLeary in Still Wakes the Deep; Humberly González as Kay Vess in Star Wars Outlaws; Isabella Inchbald as Indika in Indika; Luke Roberts as James Sunderland in Silent Hill 2; Melina Juergens as Senua in Senua's Saga: Hellblade II; Y'lan Noel as Troy Marshall in Call of Duty: Black Ops 6
Performer in a Supporting Role (presented by Katie Leung): Karen Dunbar as Finlay in Still Wakes the Deep; Abbi Greenland & Helen Goalen as The Furies in Senua's Saga: Hellblade II; Aldís Amah Hamilton as Ástríðr in Senua's Saga: Hellblade II; Jon Blyth as Big Ron in Thank Goodness You're Here!; Matt Berry as Herbert the Gardner in Thank Goodness You're Here!; Michael Abubakar as Brodie in Still Wakes the Deep	Technical Achievement (presented by Masumi Tsunoda): Senua's Saga: Hellblade II – Ninja Theory/Xbox Game Studios; Astro Bot – Team Asobi/Sony Interactive Entertainment; Black Myth: Wukong – Game Science; Call of Duty: Black Ops 6 – Treyarch/Raven/Activision; Tiny Glade – Pounce Light; Warhammer 40,000: Space Marine 2 – Saber Interactive/Focus Entertainment
BAFTA Fellowship (presented by Jessica Curry): Yoko Shimomura

== Games with multiple wins ==
Game	Wins
Astro Bot	5
Still Wakes the Deep	3
Helldivers 2	2

== Games with multiple nominations ==
Game	Nominations
Senua's Saga: Hellblade II	11
Astro Bot	8
Still Wakes the Deep	8
Thank Goodness You're Here!	7
Black Myth: Wukong	6
Helldivers 2	5
Animal Well	4
Balatro	4
Call of Duty: Black Ops 6	4
Lego Horizon Adventures	4
Star Wars Outlaws	3
Warhammer 40,000: Space Marine 2	3
Final Fantasy VII Rebirth	2
The Legend of Zelda: Echoes of Wisdom	2
Metaphor: ReFantazio	2
The Plucky Squire	2
Super Mario Party Jamboree	2
