= Thank Goodness You're Here! =

2024 video game

- Developer: Coal Supper
- Publisher: Panic
- Designers: James Carbutt; Will Todd
- Platforms: macOS; Nintendo Switch; PlayStation 4; PlayStation 5; Windows; Xbox Series X/S
- Release: macOS, Switch, PS4, PS5, Windows; 1 August 2024; Xbox Series X/S; 9 December 2025
- Genre: Adventure
- Mode: Single-player

Thank Goodness You're Here! is a 2024 comedy adventure game developed by Coal Supper and published by Panic. It is set in the fictional town of Barnsworth in the North of England, where the player controls an unnamed, yellow, very small salesman as they explore the town and help the inhabitants with their problems. Gameplay is composed of moving around the cartoon-style 2D visuals and slapping things, which serves as an all-purpose interaction. The game has a limited narrative, and is primarily focused on surreal and humorous interactions with the people of Barnsworth.

Coal Supper is a two-person Yorkshire-based indie studio composed of programmer Will Todd and artist James Carbutt. The pair began creating the game in 2019 as a series of "sketch comedy" vignettes combined with complex puzzles, before stripping away the gameplay elements to focus on the comedy. They constructed the game by inventing funny characters and interactions, which then combined together into a town based on their home town of Barnsley. Panic was selected as a publisher early in development, and the game was first announced in August 2023.

Thank Goodness You're Here! was released for macOS, Nintendo Switch, PlayStation 4, PlayStation 5, and Windows on 1 August 2024, to coincide with Yorkshire Day. It was released for Xbox Series X/S on 9 December 2025. It received positive reviews, especially for its aesthetics, design, and humour, but drew some criticism for the simplicity of gameplay and short length. The game won the British Game category at the 21st British Academy Games Awards, and was nominated for five other categories, including Best Game, Animation, and Debut Game. It also received nominations and honourable mentions at several other awards, such as for Best Indie Game at the 42nd Golden Joystick Awards and the Seumas McNally Grand Prize at the 23rd Independent Games Festival Awards.

== Gameplay and plot ==
The salesman on a Barnsworth street by a man with a stuck arm

Thank Goodness You're Here! is an adventure game in which the player controls a very small, unnamed, yellow-skinned salesman as they travel around the fictional town of Barnsworth in the North of England solving the inhabitants' problems. The game is presented in cartoon-style 2D visuals, with scenes either shown side-on or in bird's-eye view. The salesman can move around, jump, and slap, which serves as a multi-purpose "interact" option that can move objects, break objects, slap objects, or talk to characters. The game has a limited narrative, and is primarily focused on surreal and humorous interactions with the people of Barnsworth. It opens with the salesman being sent to Barnsworth for a meeting with the lord mayor; after being told that the mayor will be in a meeting for hours, he explores the town. There are a handful of distinct areas of Barnsworth in which the player can move around, as well as various buildings and small areas; as the player solves the townsfolk's problems, they move through the town areas in a loop. The problems are generally humorous and range from mundane (mowing a lawn or helping a man get his arm unstuck from a sewer grate) to surreal (helping a bedridden man's extremely long arm go shopping). At the end of the game, the salesman is overwhelmed by the residents' demands for help and returns to the mayor's office, only to find out the mayor wants his help with an errand as well.

== Development and release ==
Thank Goodness You're Here! was developed by Coal Supper, a two-person Yorkshire-based indie studio composed of programmer Will Todd and artist James Carbutt. The pair had met as children in their home town of Barnsley in the North of England, and after university developed The Good Time Garden (2019), a free, surreal adventure game. After its release, they decided to work on a larger game as a full-time endeavour. The initial concept for Thank Goodness You're Here! was a series of "sketch comedy" vignettes, with plans to include "deeper puzzles, non-linear elements, [and] more complex controls" but no main character or specific setting. The working title was "mealworm", and was intended to have a "slightly unsettling vibe". The pair approached a large number of publishers with the concept in order to fund the project, and after being rejected by several and not convincing others of the vision, selected Panic as the publisher.

As they continued designing the game, however, Todd and Carbutt grew concerned that without a stronger vision that they were going to end up creating a "bad puzzle game", which could not be saved with humour. Taking inspiration from Vic Reeves Big Night Out, a 1990s comedy show, they decided to focus the game instead on the comedy rather than the gameplay, limiting the gameplay choices to a single "interact" button. As the gameplay was limited, they wanted the "interact" button to have an external effect for the player, and chose a "slap" as it was simple and funny. The game was also given the setting of a town to provide a place for the vignettes, and the question of how the player moved between them was answered as "maybe you're just a little guy who wanders around".

The writing process for the game began with Todd and Carbutt inventing voices and characters and trying to make the other laugh with jokes. The pair would then work out how to make the jokes into gameplay. They also brought on a contract animator, Pip Williamson, and derived jokes from the way she animated the characters. As the duo's natural accents and comedic voice was based on the North of England, the characters they invented were from there, and the town then became the specific town of Barnsworth, based on Barnsley. Todd and Carbutt recorded most of the voices themselves, but some characters were voiced by others, such as Jon Blyth and Matt Berry. Originally the town was intended to be an open world, or have branching paths, but Coal Supper found that players would get lost and miss jokes. The scope of the game changed greatly over the course of development, as the pair had no experience with developing a larger game; originally they felt the game would be complete by 2021 after a year of development, but went three years over time.

Thank Goodness You're Here was announced in August 2023 at the Gamescom trade show. Prior to release, it was shown at the May 2024 London Games Festival and June Tribeca Festival. It was released on 1 August 2024, to coincide with Yorkshire Day, for Windows, macOS, Nintendo Switch, PlayStation 4, and PlayStation 5. A physical edition for Nintendo Switch and PlayStation 5 was published by Lost In Cult in 2025. The game received a port to Xbox Series X/S on 9 December 2025.

== Reception ==
Reception

Aggregate scores
Aggregator	Score
Metacritic	(PC) 89/100 (PS5) 84/100 (Switch) 84/100
OpenCritic	92% recommend

Review scores
Publication	Score
Eurogamer	5/5
GameSpot	9/10
PC Gamer (UK)	90/100
Push Square	8/10
The Guardian	5/5
Video Games Chronicle	5/5
CGMagazine	7.5/10
Gamereactor	7/10

Thank Goodness You're Here! received "generally favorable reviews", according to the review aggregation website Metacritic, and aggregator OpenCritic assessed it as having "mighty" approval. It was ranked as the twelfth-highest rated game of 2024 by aggregated score for Windows, and in the top 25 for Nintendo Switch. Critics highly praised the humour, considering it the primary focus of the game. PC Gamer named it the best comedy game of 2024, and Fraser Brown, in his review, said it was the funniest game he'd ever played, with "brilliant running gags [...] full of escalating madness". Keith Stuart of The Guardian and Jordan Middler of Video Games Chronicle similarly named it one of the funniest games ever made. Richard Wakeling of GameSpot said that it had a good mix of jokes specific to Britain or Yorkshire and more universally-appealing surreal humour, while Jenni Lada of Siliconera worried that, although she found it hilarious, the British humour might not appeal to all players. Matt Wales of Eurogamer, Eduard Gafton of CGMagazine, Magnus Groth-Andersen of GameReactor, and Stephen Tailby of Push Square all praised the humour as hilarious and fantastic, with far more hits than misses among the jokes and gags.

The gameplay received a varied reception from reviewers. Siliconera said it was more of an "interactive experience" than a traditional game, and Graham Smith of Rock Paper Shotgun called it "nearly pure narrative" with gameplay of secondary concern. PC Gamer wrote that despite its simplicity the humour made the gameplay more satisfying than many adventure games, and GameSpot said that the repetition of gameplay gave a good structure for the comedy, though they wished the game was longer than its approximately three hours. The GameReactor and CGMagazine reviews, on the other hand, found the gameplay to be too limited to be satisfying, and CGMagazine additionally found the game too short with an abrupt ending.

The aesthetics of Thank Goodness You're Here! were widely praised; Video Games Chronicle called it a "visual treat", Push Square said "the presentation is perfectly pitched", and GameReactor said that the "visual opulence" was consistently praiseworthy. GameSpot and CGMagazine praised the hand-drawn animations as both giving the game a strong visual identity while also recalling animated shows such as Adventure Time and comics such as Viz. GameReactor also praised the density of visual gags and details, calling it a "visual cornucopia". It and Push Square also praised the soundtrack and sound effects as well-suited to the game's atmosphere. GameSpot and Video Games Chronicle additionally praised the voice acting as adding "authentic, hilarious accents" to the game's humour.

=== Awards ===
Thank Goodness You're Here! won the British Game category at the 21st British Academy Games Awards, and was nominated for five other categories, including Best Game, Animation, and Debut Game. It also received nominations and honourable mentions at several other awards, such as for Best Indie Game at the 42nd Golden Joystick Awards, Outstanding Achievement in Game Direction and Story at the 28th Annual D.I.C.E. Awards, and the Seumas McNally Grand Prize at the 23rd Independent Games Festival Awards.

Awards and nominations
Ceremony	Category	Result	Ref.
21st British Academy Games Awards	Best Game	Nominated	
21st British Academy Games Awards	Animation	Nominated	
21st British Academy Games Awards	British Game	Won	
21st British Academy Games Awards	Debut Game	Nominated	
21st British Academy Games Awards	New Intellectual Property	Nominated	
21st British Academy Games Awards	Performer in a Supporting Role (Jon Blyth)	Nominated	
21st British Academy Games Awards	Performer in a Supporting Role (Matt Berry)	Nominated	
28th Annual D.I.C.E. Awards	Outstanding Achievement in Game Direction	Nominated	
28th Annual D.I.C.E. Awards	Outstanding Achievement in Story	Nominated	
25th Game Developers Choice Awards	Innovation Award	Honorable mention	
42nd Golden Joystick Awards	Best Indie Game	Nominated	
42nd Golden Joystick Awards	Best Supporting Performer (Matt Berry)	Nominated	
23rd Independent Games Festival Awards	Seumas McNally Grand Prize	Nominated	
23rd Independent Games Festival Awards	Excellence in Audio	Nominated	
23rd Independent Games Festival Awards	Excellence in Narrative	Honorable mention	
23rd Independent Games Festival Awards	Excellence in Visual Arts	Nominated	
14th New York Game Awards	Off Broadway Award for Best Indie Game	Nominated	
