= Pacific Drive =

Pacific Drive may refer to:

- Pacific Drive (TV series), a 1996 Australian television series
- Pacific Drive (video game), a 2024 survival video game
