= 25th Game Developers Choice Awards =

2025 awards ceremony in California, US

- Date: March 19, 2025
- Venue: Moscone Center; San Francisco, California
- Hosted by: Alexa Ray Corriea

Highlights
- Most awards: Balatro (4)
- Most nominations: Astro Bot (7)
- Lifetime Achievement Award: Sam Lake
- Pioneer Award: Lucas Pope
- Game of the Year: Balatro

The 25th Game Developers Choice Awards was an award ceremony honoring outstanding achievements by game developers and video games released in 2024. The event took place on March 19, 2025, at the Moscone Center in San Francisco, California and was hosted by Alexa Ray Corriea. It was held alongside the Independent Games Festival awards.

== Winners and nominees ==
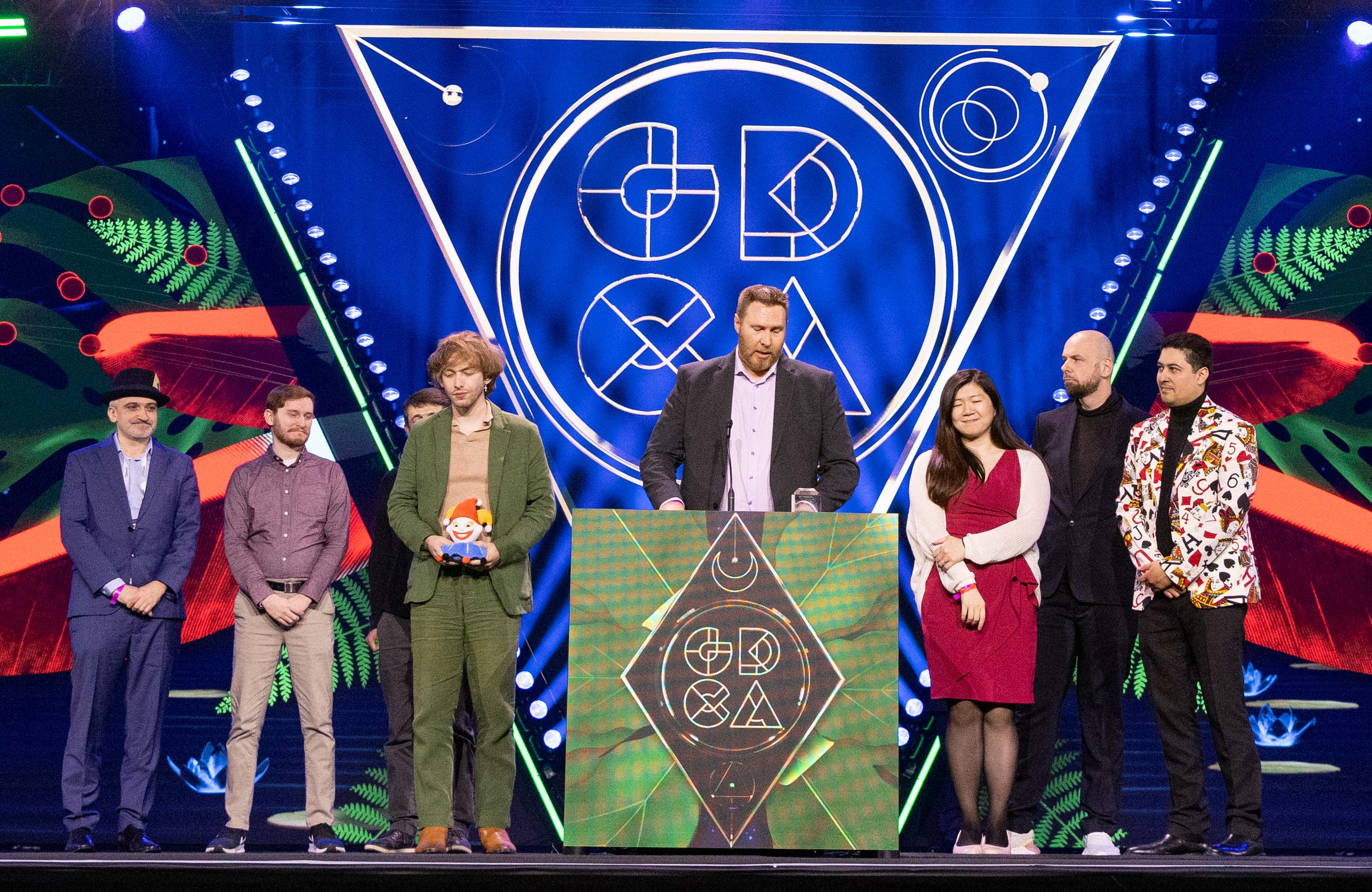
The Game of the Year Award was awarded to Balatro.

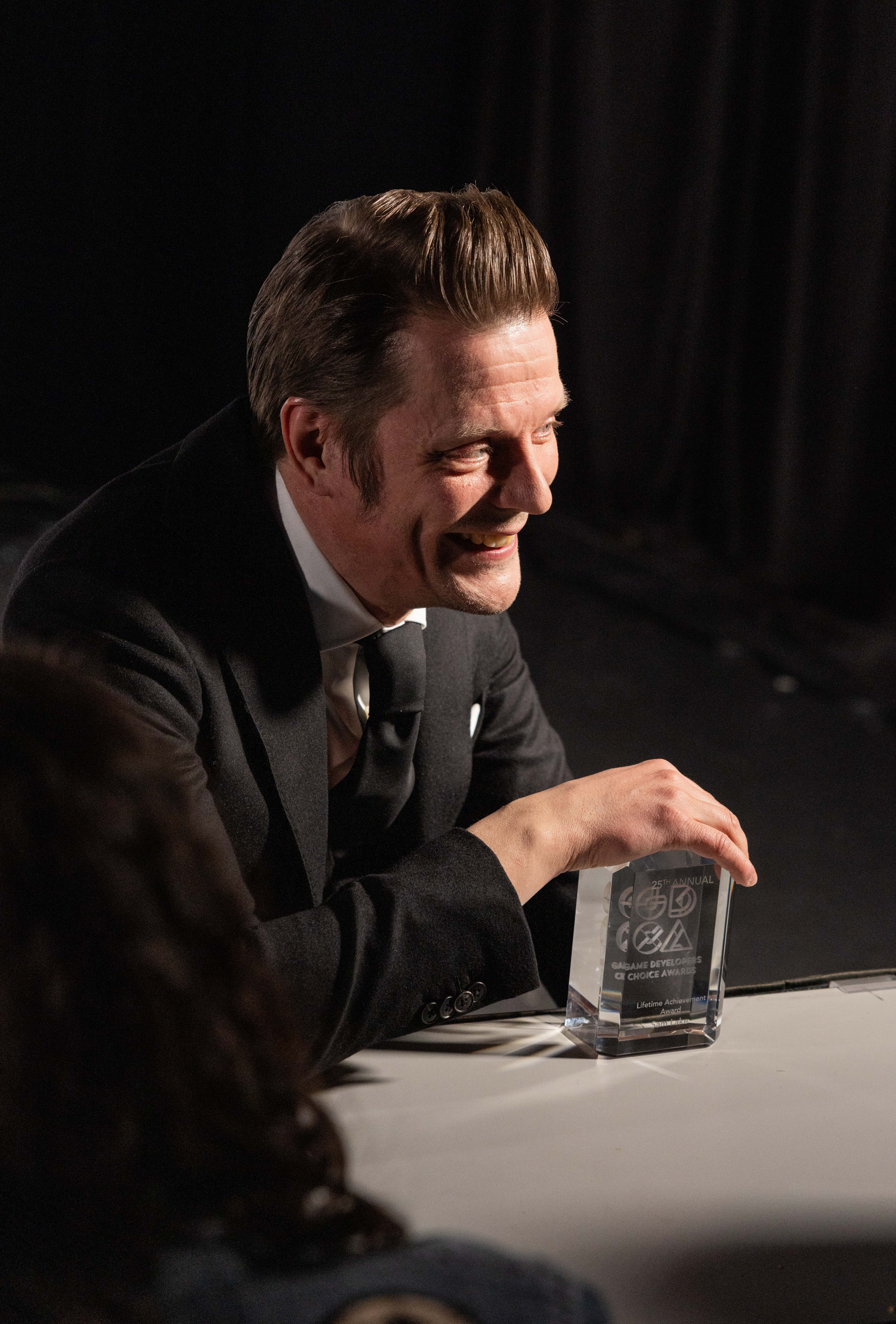
Sam Lake with his Lifetime Achievement Award.

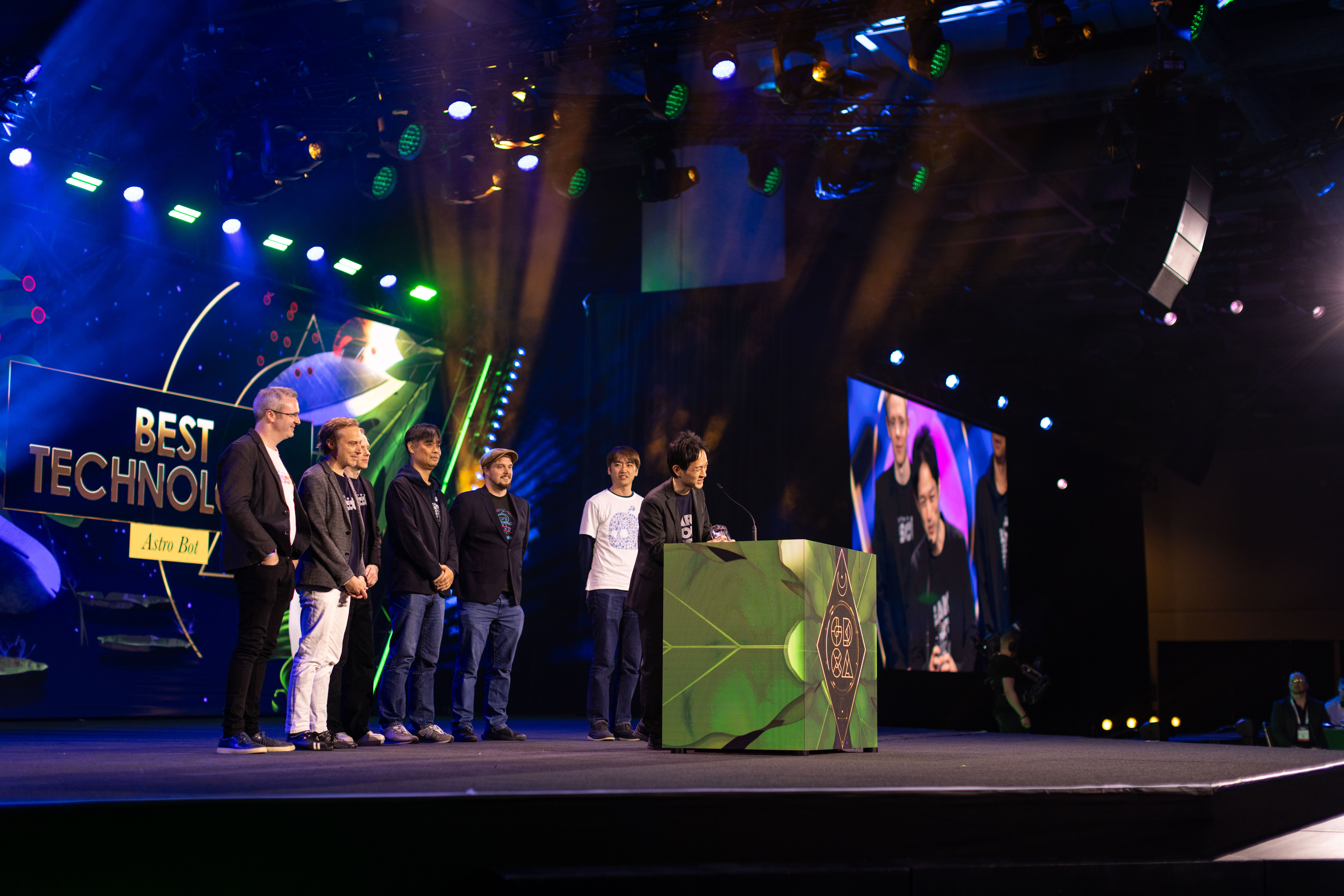
Masayuki Yamada accepting the Best Technology Award for Astro Bot.

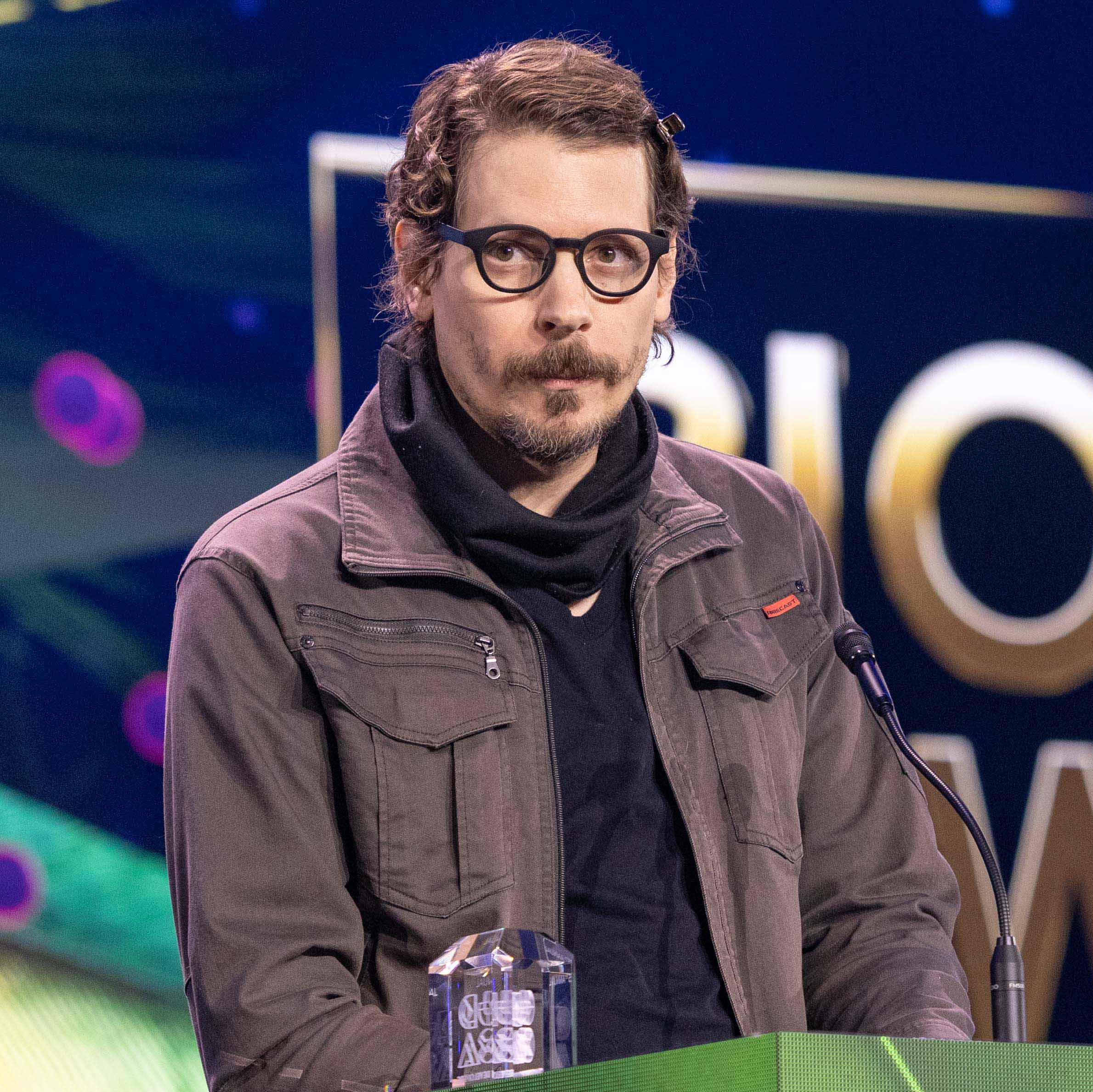
Lucas Pope with his Pioneer Award.

=== Game of the Year ===
- Balatro (LocalThunk/Playstack)
  - Astro Bot (Team Asobi/Sony Interactive Entertainment)
  - Black Myth: Wukong (Game Science)
  - Final Fantasy VII Rebirth (Square Enix)
  - Helldivers 2 (Arrowhead Game Studios/Sony Interactive Entertainment)
  - Metaphor: ReFantazio (Atlus/Sega/Studio Zero)

=== Best Audio ===
- Astro Bot (Team Asobi/Sony Interactive Entertainment)
  - Animal Well (Shared Memory/Bigmode)
  - Black Myth: Wukong (Game Science)
  - Final Fantasy VII Rebirth (Square Enix)
  - Senua's Saga: Hellblade II (Ninja Theory/Xbox Game Studios)

=== Best Debut ===
- Balatro (LocalThunk/Playstack)
  - 1000xResist (Sunset Visitor/Fellow Traveller Games)
  - Animal Well (Shared Memory/Bigmode)
  - Pacific Drive (Ironwood Studios/Kepler Interactive)
  - Tiny Glade (Pounce Light)

=== Best Design ===
- Balatro (LocalThunk/Playstack)
  - Animal Well (Shared Memory/Bigmode)
  - Astro Bot (Team Asobi/Sony Interactive Entertainment)
  - Black Myth: Wukong (Game Science)
  - Lorelei and the Laser Eyes (Simogo/Annapurna Interactive)

=== Innovation Award ===
- Balatro (LocalThunk/Playstack)
  - Animal Well (Shared Memory/Bigmode)
  - Astro Bot (Team Asobi/Sony Interactive Entertainment)
  - Black Myth: Wukong (Game Science)
  - UFO 50 (Mossmouth)

=== Best Narrative ===
- Metaphor: ReFantazio (Atlus/Sega/Studio Zero)
  - 1000xResist (Sunset Visitor/Fellow Traveller Games)
  - Black Myth: Wukong (Game Science)
  - Like a Dragon: Infinite Wealth (Ryu Ga Gotoku Studio/Sega)
  - Mouthwashing (Wrong Organ/Critical Reflex)

=== Best Technology ===
- Astro Bot (Team Asobi/Sony Interactive Entertainment)
  - Black Myth: Wukong (Game Science)
  - Helldivers 2 (Arrowhead Game Studios/Sony Interactive Entertainment)
  - Senua's Saga: Hellblade II (Ninja Theory/Xbox Game Studios)
  - Tiny Glade (Pounce Light)

=== Best Visual Art ===
- Black Myth: Wukong (Game Science)
  - Animal Well (Shared Memory/Bigmode)
  - Astro Bot (Team Asobi/Sony Interactive Entertainment)
  - Metaphor: ReFantazio (Atlus/Sega/Studio Zero)
  - Neva (Nomada Studio/Devolver Digital)

=== Social Impact ===
- Life is Strange: Double Exposure (Deck Nine/Square Enix)
  - 1000xResist (Sunset Visitor/Fellow Traveller Games)
  - Astro Bot (Team Asobi/Sony Interactive Entertainment)
  - Frostpunk 2 (11 Bit Studios)
  - Neva (Nomada Studio/Devolver Digital)

=== Lifetime Achievement Award ===
- Sam Lake, creative director at Remedy Entertainment, writer for the Max Payne and Alan Wake series

=== Pioneer Award ===
- Lucas Pope, developer of Papers, Please and Return of the Obra Dinn
