= Indika (video game) =

2024 video game

- Developer: Odd Meter
- Publisher: 11 Bit Studios (Note: Physical versions published by Merge Games on PlayStation 5 and Silver Lining Interactive on Nintendo Switch.)
- Director: Dmitry Svetlow
- Programmer: Alex Posedko
- Artists: Maxim Skobolev; Anton Shvedov; Elena Alt; Arthur Nizamutdinov; Daniil Lempert; Ryabov
- Writers: Dmitry Svetlow; Maxim Lebedev
- Composers: Mike Sabadash; Daniil Tsovin; Aleksey Stepanov
- Platforms: Windows; PlayStation 5; Xbox Series X/S; Nintendo Switch
- Release: Windows; May 2, 2024; PS5, Xbox Series X/S; May 17, 2024; Nintendo Switch; November 17, 2025
- Genres: Adventure, puzzle
- Mode: Single-player

Indika is a 2024 third-person adventure game developed by Odd Meter and published by 11 Bit Studios. It was released in May 2024 for Windows, PlayStation 5 and Xbox Series X/S, and for Nintendo Switch in November 2025. It received generally positive reviews.

== Gameplay ==
In the game, players take control of Indika, a nun looking to adjust to a monastic life. The twist in the tale comes in the form of her companion: she has a connection with the Devil himself; and it is this connection, or relationship, that is further explored in the game. The game emphasizes on this story-telling device and the conflict between the church's perspectives and lifestyle and her own doubts and religious beliefs. The game requires players to navigate various obstacles, do platforming sequences, solve puzzles, obtain collectibles while traversing across surreal landscapes and interacting with strange people during this journey.

== Plot ==
In late 19th century Russia, Indika is an Eastern Orthodox nun who hears the voice of the Devil and sees visions. The other sisters at the Convent do not like Indika and often have her perform menial duties. After a vision causes her to knock a priest over during the Eucharist, Indika is given the job of leaving the convent to deliver a letter to Father Herman in the Danilov monastery. Along the way, she comes across a train accident. The conductor warns her that it was a prison train and that, while most of the prisoners were shot, a few are still around.

Arriving in a town, Indika stumbles upon a prison guard attempting to rape a woman. She accidentally alerts the man to her presence, who goes for her next, but he's stopped by Ilya, the prisoner the guard is searching for. Ilya then forces Indika at gunpoint to drive a motorized bike to help him escape the soldiers looking for him. She gives him some morphine and the two keep moving, but Indika crashes the bike.

While knocked out, Indika has a flashback from before she was a nun, helping her father run a bicycle shop. One of their bicycles is stolen by a Romani boy named Mirko. Despite this, Indika and Mirko start a secret romantic relationship, with Mirko teaching her how to play the flute.

When they come to, Indika discovers Ilya's arm is broken, frostbitten, infected, and needs to be amputated. Indika offers to bring Ilya to a hospital, but he reveals that he has been talking to God and that God wants him to travel to the Temple of John of Damascus in Spasov to see a holy relic known as the Kudets, which he believes will fix his arm. During the trip, the Devil convinces Indika to open the letter she needs to deliver to find out what it contains and discovers that she is being defrocked. Because of this, Indika decides to go with Ilya to see the Kudets. The two jump onto a train going to Spasov.

Arriving at a fish factory, Ilya asks Indika to help him retrieve some personal items before they go to the Temple. The items end up being a pair of finger puppets, which Ilya and Indika play with for a few minutes before Ilya collapses. Worried he'll get sepsis, Indika chooses to amputate Ilya's arm. Believing that she denied his miracle from God, and revealing God has not talked to him since they started traveling together, Ilya leaves.

Despite this, Indika still goes to the Temple, where she meets back up with Ilya, who has read her letter. The two enter the Temple and ask to see the Kudets, but the priest will not let them. Indika explains that Ilya is a prisoner, and an armed guard arrives. During the confusion, Indika pushes the priest into the guard, causing him to accidentally shoot and kill the priest. Ilya finds the Kudets and prays, but nothing happens. In frustration he steals the Kudets and escapes, leaving Indika to be captured and put in a cell.

In a final flashback, Indika and Mirko are continuing their secret relationship. The two agree to run away to the city, and steal money from Indika's father for funds. However, her father catches Mirko in the act. When Indika is given a chance to save Mirko, she doesn't take it, and her father shoots and kills Mirko.

Back in the present, Indika is put in a cell. The guard offers to free her in return for sexual favors, but after Indika does so he refuses to help. With assistance from the Devil, Indika manages to disable the guard and escape from prison. Wandering around the town, she finds Ilya, who reveals he sold the Kudets at a pawn shop for five rubles and a trumpet. Indika goes to the pawn shop and finds the Kudets. While Ilya distracts the owner, she prays to it in front of a mirror, with her reflection being that of the Devil. When nothing happens, Indika opens up the Kudets and discovers it is empty. Her own reflection returns, but with her faith broken, Indika's prayer beads shatter on the pawn shop floor.

== Development ==
The game was announced by publisher 11 Bit Studios during the Future Games Show 2024. The developers had to move from Russia to Kazakhstan and finish the game there. Per Odd Meter game director Dmitry Svetlow: "After February 24, things were complicated even further as staying in Russia became physically scary". He then adds in another article that "We left because it was psychologically distressing to stay".

== Reception ==
Reception

Aggregate scores
Aggregator	Score
Metacritic	(PC) 80/100 (PS5) 81/100 (XSXS) 82/100
OpenCritic	74% recommend

Review scores
Publication	Score
Eurogamer	4/5
Game Informer	8.75/10
PC Gamer (US)	79/100

The game received "generally favorable" reviews according to review aggregator website Metacritic, and 74% of critics recommended it according to OpenCritic.

=== Accolades ===
Year	Ceremony	Category	Result	Ref.
2024	Golden Joystick Awards	Best Indie Game	Nominated	
2024	The Game Awards 2024	Games for Impact	Nominated	
2025	28th Annual D.I.C.E. Awards	Outstanding Achievement for an Independent Game	Nominated	
2025	28th Annual D.I.C.E. Awards	Outstanding Achievement in Character (Indika)	Nominated	
2025	Game Audio Network Guild Awards	Best Dialogue for An Indie Game	Won	
2025	Independent Games Festival	Seumas McNally Grand Prize	Nominated	
2025	Independent Games Festival	Excellence in Audio	Nominated	
2025	Independent Games Festival	Excellence in Narrative	Nominated	
2025	21st British Academy Games Awards	Game Beyond Entertainment	Longlisted	
2025	21st British Academy Games Awards	Performer in a Leading Role (Isabella Inchbald as Indika)	Nominated	
2025	Japan Game Awards	Game Designers Award	Won	
