= British Academy Games Award for Animation =

Video game award

- Awarded for: The best animation in a video game.
- Country: United Kingdom
- Presented by: British Academy of Film and Television Arts
- Currently held by: Dispatch
- Website: www.bafta.org/games

The British Academy Video Games Award for Animation is an award presented annually by the British Academy of Film and Television Arts (BAFTA). It is given in honor to "the highest level of excellence in bringing a game to life," considering elements such as "player control, non-player characters, ambient/environmental animation, facial animation and cinematics". The category also considers the style, fluidity and responsiveness of the character.

The current holder of the award is Dispatch by AdHoc Studio, which won at the 22nd British Academy Games Awards in 2026.

== History ==
The category was first presented to Soulcalibur II at the 1st British Academy Games Awards in 2004 under the name Animation or Intro. The following year, it received its current name but was subsequently discontinued. The category was revived at the 16th British Academy Games Awards in 2019. As developers, six studios have received two nominations in the category, though only Insomniac Games and Naughty Dog have achieved any wins. For publishers, Sony Interactive Entertainment hold the record for most nominations, with eleven, and also have the most wins in the category, with four.

== Winners and nominees ==
In the following table, the years are listed as per BAFTA convention, and generally correspond to the year of game release in the United Kingdom.

Table key
Indicates the winner

Animation or Intro

Year	Game	Recipient(s)	Developer(s)	Publisher(s)	Ref.
2002/03 (1st)	Soulcalibur II		Project Soul	Namco	
2002/03 (1st)	Big Mutha Truckers		Eutechnyx	Empire Interactive	
2002/03 (1st)	Grand Theft Auto: Vice City		Rockstar North	Rockstar Games	
2002/03 (1st)	Primal		SCE Studio Cambridge	Sony Computer Entertainment	
2002/03 (1st)	Tekken 4		Namco		
2002/03 (1st)	Viewtiful Joe		Capcom		

Animation

Year	Game	Recipient(s)	Developer(s)	Publisher(s)	Ref.
2003/04 (2nd)	Half-Life 2		Valve		
2003/04 (2nd)	Grand Theft Auto: San Andreas		Rockstar North	Rockstar Games	
2003/04 (2nd)	Halo 2		Bungie	Microsoft Game Studios	
2003/04 (2nd)	Jak 3		Naughty Dog	Sony Computer Entertainment	
2003/04 (2nd)	Killzone		Guerrilla Games	Sony Computer Entertainment	
2003/04 (2nd)	Onimusha 3: Demon Siege		Capcom		
2019 (16th)	Luigi's Mansion 3		Next Level Games	Nintendo	
2019 (16th)	Call of Duty: Modern Warfare		Infinity Ward	Activision	
2019 (16th)	Sekiro: Shadows Die Twice		FromSoftware	Activision	
2019 (16th)	Control		Remedy Entertainment	505 Games	
2019 (16th)	Death Stranding		Kojima Productions	Sony Interactive Entertainment	
2019 (16th)	Sayonara Wild Hearts		Simogo	Annapurna Interactive	
2020 (17th)	The Last of Us Part II		Naughty Dog	Sony Interactive Entertainment	
2020 (17th)	Doom Eternal		id Software	Bethesda Softworks	
2020 (17th)	Final Fantasy VII Remake		Square Enix		
2020 (17th)	Spider-Man: Miles Morales		Insomniac Games	Sony Interactive Entertainment	
2020 (17th)	Ori and the Will of the Wisps		Moon Studios	Xbox Game Studios	
2020 (17th)	Spiritfarer		Thunder Lotus	Kowloon Nights	
2021 (18th)	Ratchet & Clank: Rift Apart		Insomniac Games	Sony Interactive Entertainment	
2021 (18th)	Call of Duty: Vanguard		Sledgehammer Games	Activision	
2021 (18th)	It Takes Two		Hazelight Studios	Electronic Arts	
2021 (18th)	Kena: Bridge of Spirits	Hunter Schmidt	Ember Lab		
2021 (18th)	Life Is Strange: True Colors		Deck Nine	Square Enix	
2021 (18th)	Psychonauts 2		Double Fine	Xbox Game Studios	
2022 (19th)	God of War Ragnarök	Bruno Velazquez, Erica Pinto, Mehdi Yssef	Santa Monica	Sony Interactive Entertainment	
2022 (19th)	Call of Duty: Modern Warfare II	Mark Grigsby, Bruce Ferris, Khoa Le	Infinity Ward	Activision	
2022 (19th)	Horizon Forbidden West		Guerrilla	Sony Interactive Entertainment	
2022 (19th)	Lego Star Wars: The Skywalker Saga		TT Games	Warner Bros Interactive	
2022 (19th)	Sifu		Sloclap	Sloclap & Kepler Interactive	
2022 (19th)	Stray	Jophray Mikolajczyk, Jean-Marie Vouillon, Simon Jacquart	BlueTwelve	Annapurna Interactive	
2023 (20th)	Hi-Fi Rush		Tango Gameworks	Bethesda Softworks	
2023 (20th)	Alan Wake 2		Remedy Entertainment	Epic Games	
2023 (20th)	Hogwarts Legacy		Avalanche Software	Warner Bros. Games	
2023 (20th)	Spider-Man 2		Insomniac Games	Sony Interactive Entertainment	
2023 (20th)	Star Wars Jedi: Survivor		Respawn Entertainment	Electronic Arts	
2023 (20th)	Super Mario Bros. Wonder		Nintendo		
2024 (21st)	Astro Bot		Team Asobi	Sony Interactive Entertainment	
2024 (21st)	Call of Duty: Black Ops 6		Treyarch, Raven Software	Activision	
2024 (21st)	Lego Horizon Adventures		Guerrilla Games	Sony Interactive Entertainment	
2024 (21st)	Senua's Saga: Hellblade II		Ninja Theory	Xbox Game Studios	
2024 (21st)	Thank Goodness You're Here!	Will Todd, James Carbutt	Coal Supper	Panic Inc.	
2024 (21st)	Warhammer 40,000: Space Marine 2		Saber St. Petersburg	Focus Entertainment	
2025 (22nd)	Dispatch		AdHoc Studio		
2025 (22nd)	Battlefield 6		Battlefield Studios	Electronic Arts	
2025 (22nd)	Death Stranding 2: On the Beach	Hideo Kojima, Masaaki Kawata, Neil Johnson	Kojima Productions	Sony Interactive Entertainment	
2025 (22nd)	Ghost of Yōtei		Sucker Punch Productions	Sony Interactive Entertainment	
2025 (22nd)	Hades II	Craig Harris, Nikita Taranduke, Jen Zee	Supergiant Games		
2025 (22nd)	Hollow Knight: Silksong		Team Cherry		

(*Note: The games that don't have recipients on the table had Development Team credited on the awards page.)

== Multiple nominations and wins ==
=== Developers ===
Developer	Nominations	Wins
Insomniac Games	3	1
Naughty Dog	2	1
Capcom	2	0
Guerrilla Games	2	0
Infinity Ward	2	0
Rockstar North	2	0

=== Publishers ===
Developer	Nominations	Wins
Sony Computer/Interactive Entertainment	10	3
Activision	4	0
Namco	2	1
Annapurna Interactive	2	0
Bethesda Softworks	2	0
Electronic Arts	2	0
Nintendo	2	0
Rockstar Games	2	0
Square Enix	2	0
Warner Bros. Games	2	0
Xbox Game Studios	2	0
