= Paper Trail (video game) =

2024 puzzle video game

- Developer: Newfangled Games
- Publishers: Netflix; Newfangled Games
- Producers: Robert Maloney; Lélia Peuchamiel
- Designer: Henry Hoffman
- Programmer: Gonzalo Ceciliano de la Peña
- Artist: Frederick Hoffman
- Composer: Claudie Mackula
- Platforms: Nintendo Switch, PlayStation 4, PlayStation 5, Windows, macOS, Xbox One, Xbox Series X/S, iOS, Android
- Release: 21 May 2024
- Genre: Puzzle video game
- Mode: Single-player

Paper Trail is a 2024 puzzle video game developed by Newfangled Games and published by Netflix and Newfangled Games. The game follows Paige, a woman who leaves her home town and journeys to university in the city, as she moves through a series of puzzle screens. The player can fold each screen like a sheet of paper origami-style, flipping the back of the page to create new paths. The game progressively adds elements to the puzzles that make the puzzles more complex, such as movable platforms, non-rectangular sections, or items that block movement or folding.

Newfangled Games was founded in 2019 by veteran developer brothers Henry and Frederick Hoffman, with Paper Trail as its first game. It was initially intended to be completed within a year, but investment by a development fund led to the expansion of the studio and scope. After the game's announcement in 2022, Netflix agreed to publish it through its Netflix Games subscription service in addition to Newfangled's own self-published release and it was released nearly two years later. The visuals and music were praised by critics. The gameplay and its difficulty received a more mixed reception and the plot was largely dismissed as unimportant. Paper Trail received nominations for the British Game category at the 21st British Academy Games Awards and the Mobile Game of the Year category at the 28th Annual D.I.C.E. Awards.

== Gameplay and plot ==
Paige on a walkway in a puzzle to provide power to a door; the top-right corner is folded over, connecting a pathway on the back of the page to one on the front. The previous and next puzzles are slightly visible on the bottom and top of the screen.

Paper Trail is a puzzle video game in which the player guides Paige, a woman from a small village, through a series of puzzles. The plot follows Paige as she leaves her parents and home, journeying to the city university where she has been accepted into an astrophysics program. Each screen is a puzzle, and is presented in a top-down perspective as if the world is sheets of paper, with details and paths on both sides. The goal of each screen is to get Paige to the exit to the next area. Paige travels linearly through dozens of screens divided into several areas, such as a cave, swamp, and abandoned cathedral. Each puzzle contains one or more sheets. The player folds the sheets origami-style horizontally, vertically, and diagonally; folds may not cross each other, Paige, or certain objects. Paige can move along pathways, which can be changed by combining parts of the front and back of the sheets. Collectible origami figures are placed throughout the game in areas that are challenging to reach.

As the game progresses, new elements are added to the puzzles; these include non-rectangular sheets, movable platforms, statues that block folds, and keystones that must be moved along paths to receptacles to unlock doors. A hint system can show the player the sequence of folds that must be done, though not where to move Paige or objects. Each area contains characters that comment on Paige's journey, and at the end of an area a flashback is presented as a series of images that must be folded. The flashbacks detail how Paige and her brother learned as children how to fold the world to disappear into other places. One day her brother disappeared into a fold and never returned, leading their parents to insist on Paige staying home rather than pursuing her dreams of higher education. The final sequence shows Paige reuniting with her parents after completing her degree.

== Development ==
Paper Trail was developed by Newfangled Games, founded in 2019 by brothers Henry and Frederick Hoffman. They had previously worked on multiple other video games, including Q.U.B.E. (2011) and Hue (2016), which was designed and developed by Henry at a studio he founded. The brothers decided to make a video game together with a new company, and began prototyping ideas on paper in a London basement. They were interested in finding a gameplay mechanic to start with, and became intrigued by the way levels drawn on both sides of a paper could interact when the paper was folded, and explored different ways to use the concept. The initial ideas were for a side-scrolling game, or a Metroidvania where the game map could be folded. However, they found that folding was more confusing than interesting in those genres, partially due to gravity limiting the movement benefits of folding the screen. Next, they prototyped a top-down viewpoint, but after finding it visually uninteresting, they shifted to a "tilted top-down perspective".

The pair initially planned to spend a year building a short game, and iterated through a few narratives inspired by the folding mechanic. The initial story was centered on the idea of "being in two places at the same time", with a girl whose parents were divorcing and whose grandmother was dying, using folding to try to be in both places at once. The final story was instead based on the brothers' experiences of feeling trapped in their home town, and wanting to slip away to "adventure and broader horizons". Over the course of the initial development year, however, they acquired an investment from Astra Fund, a video game venture fund. The scope of the game expanded due to the investment, adding voiced characters, an original soundtrack, and additional gameplay mechanics. Henry later estimated that the original concept was a quarter of the size of the final game.

The Hoffmans moved the studio to Norwich and began to hire and contract a handful of developers, with the aim of making Newfangled a sustainable business venture beyond the first game. Frederick was the art director, while Henry was the lead designer and developer. Development continued for the next two years, and the game was announced in June 2022.That August the studio showed the project at Gamescom, where it won the Best Family Game award. At that trade fair, Henry talked with Netflix, which he later said was interested in the game due to the award, as it wanted family-friendly games on its Netflix Games subscription platform. Netflix agreed to publish Paper Trail on its platform for mobile and console devices, while Newfangled Games would also self-publish the game as a stand-alone title for PCs and consoles. Netflix additionally provided support for testing and pushed for enhancing accessibility through the hint system.

After its announcement, work on the game continued for nearly another two years, adding new levels and game mechanics and the ability to see the reverse side of the level. The game also underwent numerous rounds of playtesting for game difficulty balance resulting in levels being redesigned and mechanics removed, such as feedable frogs and tightropes. Paper Trail was released on Nintendo Switch, PlayStation 4 and 5, Xbox One and X/S, iOS, Android, Windows, and macOS on 21 May 2024. A physical version for Switch and PlayStation 5 is planned for release by Lost In Cult in mid-2026. The soundtrack, composed by Claudie Mackula, was released digitally in June 2024, and a vinyl release is planned to be produced by Lost In Cult in early 2026.

== Reception ==
Reception

Aggregate scores
Aggregator	Score
Metacritic	PC: 80/100; PS5: 75/100; Switch: 83/100; XBXS: 82/100
OpenCritic	75% recommend

Review scores
Publication	Score
Edge	7/10
Nintendo Life	9/10
Pocket Gamer	4/5
Push Square	8/10
Video Games Chronicle	4/5
Gamereactor	7/10

Paper Trail won the Best Family Game at the 2022 Gamescom Awards while in development. After release, it was nominated for the British Game category at the 21st British Academy Games Awards, and for Mobile Game of the Year at the 28th Annual D.I.C.E. Awards.

The game received "generally favorable" reviews from critics, according to the review aggregation website Metacritic. Aggregator OpenCritic assessed it as having "strong" approval. It was ranked as the 25th-highest rated game of 2024 by aggregated score for both the Nintendo Switch and Xbox X/S. The gameplay was generally praised, with Mitch Vogel of Nintendo Life calling it "equally concise and varied", Jenny Jones of Push Square praising the variety and incremental addition of new puzzle mechanics, and Iwan Morris of Pocket Gamer saying that the folding gameplay was intuitive and a "relaxing experience". Opinions were mixed on the difficulty, however; Chris Scullion of Video Games Chronicle found it fun and challenging, while Nic Reuben of Rock Paper Shotgun described the puzzles as "oppressive and endless". Palle Havshøi-Jensen of Gamereactor concluded that the puzzles were fun and engaging, but that the gameplay overall was lacking something to make it more than a "nice puzzle game".

The game's plot was largely dismissed by critics; Harold Goldberg of the New York Times and Gamereactor both termed it "paper thin", and Rock Paper Shotgun said that there was not truly any plot at all. Push Square and Pocket Gamer said that it was a nice tale, but not a highly original or deeply impactful one. The aesthetics of the game were praised, particularly the visual style: the New York Times called it "beautifully detailed" and like a children's story book, while Nintendo Life said it was "like a storybook come to life". Push Square, Rock Paper Shotgun, and Gamereactor all applauded the colorful and vibrant art style, and Rock Paper Shotgun and Nintendo Life praised the detailed and lively features and inhabitants of the world. Gamereactor and Pocket Gamer also enjoyed the music of the game as nice and relaxing, while a review in Edge said it gave an ambience of mystery. The Video Games Chronicle review concluded that Paper Trail looked and sounded so "lovely" that it overcame any issues with the gameplay.
