= Harold Halibut =

2024 video game

- Developer: Slow Bros.
- Publisher: Slow Bros.
- Director: Onat Hekimoğlu
- Designer: Onat Hekimoğlu
- Programmer: Onat Hekimoğlu
- Artist: Ole Tillman
- Writers: Onat Hekimoğlu; Fabian Preuschoff; Ole Tillmann; Daniel Beckmann; Danny Wadeson
- Composer: Onat Hekimoğlu
- Engine: Unity
- Platforms: PlayStation 5; Windows; Xbox Series X/S; MacOS; Nintendo Switch 2
- Release: PS5, Windows, Xbox Series X/S; 16 April 2024; Nintendo Switch 2; November 12, 2026
- Genre: Graphic adventure
- Mode: Single-player

Harold Halibut is a 2024 video game developed by German independent developer Slow Bros for PlayStation 5, Windows, Xbox Series X/S, and Nintendo Switch 2. The game is a narrative-based adventure video game in which players control Harold, a janitor on a spacecraft submerged in an alien planet, and complete odd tasks for the ship's inhabitants. The game was created over a ten-year development process, first conceived as an unfunded part-time project to create a narrative game inspired by stop-motion animation. To implement a stop-motion aesthetic, the developers hand-made characters, objects and environments using various materials scanned into the game and animated in the Unity engine. During development, the game received several features, nominations and accolades for video game, film and culture festivals.

Upon release, Harold Halibut received mixed reviews, with critics praising the ambition and detail of the game's visual presentation and the themes in its narrative, although critiquing the game's narrative focus as lacking puzzles and interactivity and having a slow pace.

== Gameplay ==
The game's adventure gameplay is a linear, story-driven experience that takes place across six chapters. Players navigate the interior districts of the Fedora and interact or overhear conversations from its characters to progress the story. Characters provide the players with tasks, some necessary to complete the game and others optional, which are logged as a to-do list in a PDA menu. Completion of tasks requires simple point-and-click interactions with objects in the game, with some tasks involving small puzzles or minigames, such as cleaning a room through a Tetris-based minigame. Optional interactive minigames can be played in an arcade on the Fedora.

== Plot ==
During the peak of the Cold War in the 1970s, the space ship Fedora I, controlled by the All Water corporation, was sent from Earth to find a planet for humankind to colonise. Drifting for over two hundred years, the ship encounters a solar flare and is stranded at the bottom of an alien ocean on an uninhabitable planet, where it has remained for another fifty years.

The player is Harold, a shy and withdrawn maintenance worker on the staff of the ship, who assists the scientist Jeanna Mareaux, who is commissioned to look for ways to escape the planet. Harold also performs odd jobs for the other inhabitants, many with different philosophies, including their views on whether to leave the Fedora or stay.

When a once-in-a-lifetime opportunity to relaunch the craft unaffected by the solar flare and return to home is discovered, Harold is placed in a unique position to make a difference in the future of the ship and its populace. During the game, Harold discovers a fish-like humanoid stuck in the ship's filtration system he names 'Fishy', providing him with a window into the perspective of the alien life on the planet. Harold also discovers the original mission of the Fedora may not have been as essential as its inhabitants believe.

== Development and release ==
The developers of Harold Halibut created all the assets for the game from hand-made materials, including clay, wood, and textiles.

Harold Halibut was created by Slow Bros., a Cologne studio led by independent developer Onat Hekimoğlu, a filmmaker and graduate of the Cologne Game Lab. The development process for the game took place over ten years, with the development team first working on the game on a part-time basis with low funding, and developing in size and commitment as a full-time project over time. In 2012, the initial three-person development team conceived the idea from a conversation about the potential to create a narrative-led video game using stop-motion animation, citing inspiration from classic adventure games and films including Jason and the Argonauts and The Valley of Gwangi. The team also were interested in the use of hand-made assets and stop-motion as they lacked experience in 3D modelling, preferring to leverage their skills of carpentry, sculpture, lighting and costume design to create a game.

To create and animate the assets for the game, the development team hand-made puppets, sets, props, and costumes from various materials including clay, textiles, welded metal, and recycled wood. These items were then rendered in 3D using photogrammetry by photographing the objects from all angles, animated as "digitally rigged" puppets and imported into the Unity engine. To animate the characters, motion capture was used through a motion tracking rig, which filmed the movements of actors and fit them to the models of the 3D puppets. This approach was taken instead of the originally intended approach of using stop-motion animation for characters to streamline the production process, as art director Ole Tillman stated the original approach was "too restrictive" and time-consuming. Hekimoğlu estimated that the production process required 200 kilograms of clay. Originally conceived to be more reliant on puzzles, Hekimoğlu stated that this approach was abandoned for a more narrative and linear one to focus on player immersion and interaction with the characters and world, taking influence from other narrative games including Night in the Woods and Firewatch.

=== Release ===
In June 2017, the studio launched a failed Kickstarter to secure $170,000 in funding for development, with Hekimoğlu considering the campaign a success in terms of raising awareness for the game, but attributing its failure to the lack of initial promotion. Harold Halibut was announced at the Gamescom Future Games show on 22 March 2024 with a showcase trailer and release date, and published on Steam on 16 April. A Nintendo Switch 2 port is set to release on November 12, 2026.

== Reception ==
Reception

Aggregate scores
Aggregator	Score
Metacritic	(PC) 69/100 (PS5) 70/100 (XSXS) 74/100
OpenCritic	58% recommend

Review scores
Publication	Score
Edge	5/10
Eurogamer	3/5 stars
GameSpot	7/10
GamesRadar+	4/5 stars
IGN	8/10
Jeuxvideo.com	16/20
MeriStation	6/10
PC Gamer (US)	60%
Shacknews	9/10
Multiplayer.it	8.5/10
Siliconera	10/10

According to review aggregator Metacritic, Harold Halibut received "mixed or average" reviews from critics. Fellow review aggregator OpenCritic assessed that the game received fair approval, being recommended by 58% of critics.

Reviewers praised the visual presentation of the game, also noting its scope and ambition. Describing the graphics as a "monument to craft", Edge noted the game's "remarkable technical wizardry" and "authentically traditional" design, comparing it to Aardman stop-motion animation. Rollin Bishop of GamesRadar+ praised the "charming" models for their "tangible" design and meticulous attention detail, although finding the models to have "awkward" and unintended movements in their animation. Describing the game's visuals as an "undeniable technical achievement", Daniel Bueno of Siliconera commended the game's "unique" visuals for their "crisp look".

Critics expressed generally positive views about the game's narrative and characterisation. Harold Goldberg of the New York Times considered the game's story to have an "honesty, empathy and a subtle mastery of human nature that isn't present in many games". Rollin Bishop of GamesRadar+ found the story to be "surprisingly poignant" in addition to expectedly "unusual and funny" aspects of the game. Alice Bell of Rock Paper Shotgun found the characters charmingly odd and the game replete with "strange little interactions", viewing the story as "heartwarming" and "quietly triumphant". Meg Pelliccio of TheGamer highlighted the game's "fulfilling" narrative and emotional breadth, citing the many "moments of sadness, bittersweet closure, mystery, or simply a scene so surreal or stylish it stays with you". Describing the game as "thoughtful", Lucas White of Shacknews found the game's themes around Harold's personal growth as "compelling", and praised the "hopeful" tone of the game, although considering the sinister undertones of the game "fizzle into dead ends at times". Despite "flashes of brilliance" and "affection for its characters", Joshua Wolens of PC Gamer considered the dialog to "drag on" and compromise the hints of "daring" and "genuinely funny" subject matter. Edge believed the game featured a "satisfying conclusion", although expressing that it could have had "sharper" dialogue and humor. Katharine Castle of Rock Paper Shotgun also critiqued Harold as a "vacant and disinterested human being" and the cruelty and pointlessness of other characters' initial interactions with him.

Critics noted the game lacked conventional gameplay features for an adventure game, such as puzzles, due to the narrative focus of the game. Describing the game as a "light experience", Daniel Bueno of Siliconera considered Harold Halibut to lack a "hands-on" approach, lacking more puzzles or interaction, but believed these to be unnecessary for a narrative game. Lucas White of Shacknews noted that the game did not feature conventional puzzles, branching paths or multiple endings. Matt Gardner of Forbes stated that the gameplay puzzles were rare and short-lived, lacked nuance and skill, and were inconsistent with the narrative, also critiquing the "identical and surprisingly poor" arcade games.

Several reviewers critiqued the slow pacing of the game. Alice Bell of Rock Paper Shotgun stated the game as "inexplicably" long and understood why players could consider it boring due to its "very slow" pace. Similarly, Katharine Castle of Rock Paper Shotgun noted the slow walking and running speed contributed to this pace. Edge stated that the "drudgery" of playing the character tested their tolerance for fetch quests, citing the lack of interactivity, long dialogue, and limited player agency in the story. Joshua Wolens of PC Gamer critiqued the game's "strictly narrative" focus as "ponderous" and "fatiguing", citing the "long, barren stretches" of gameplay between interesting sequences. Rollin Bishop of GamesRadar+ similarly considered the game to feature too much walking. Describing the game as an "unexciting slog" and "repetitive", Willa Rowe of Kotaku stated that the game "never fully breaks out of its mundanity", citing the focus on "boring chores" and the lack of a sense of urgency.

=== Accolades ===
Harold Halibut received nominations accolades in several game and film festivals, including nominations for the 'Most Wanted' and 'Best Marketing' at the 2017 Deutscher Entwicklerpreis, one of the winners of the German Government's 2019 Cultural and Creative Industries Kultur- und Kreativpiloten Deutschland award, the winner of the 'video game' category in the 2022 San Francisco Frozen Film Festival, and nominations for the 'Critic's Choice' and 'Most Anticipated Game' categories for the 2023 Indie Cup Germany. The game also was selected for inclusion in several other festivals, including the 2021 Tribeca Festival as part of the Tribeca Games Spotlight, the 2021 Slamdance Film Festival, and the 2023 KLIK Amsterdam Animation Festival.

Year	Ceremony	Category	Result	Ref.
2024	Golden Joystick Awards	Best Visual Design	Nominated	
2025	New York Game Awards	Herman Melville Award for Best Writing in a Game	Nominated	
2025	21st British Academy Games Awards	Artistic Achievement	Nominated	
2025	Deutscher Computerspielpreis	Bestes Grafikdesign	Won	
