= Vampire Therapist =

2024 video game

- Developer: Little Bat Games
- Publisher: Little Bat Games
- Director: Cyrus Nemati
- Platforms: Windows; macOS; Linux; Nintendo Switch; PlayStation 4; PlayStation 5; Xbox One; Xbox Series X/S
- Release: Windows, macOS, Linux; July 18, 2024; Switch, PlayStation 4, PlayStation 5 February 17, 2026; Xbox One, Xbox Series X/S; March 5, 2026
- Genres: Visual novel, Adventure, Simulation
- Mode: Single-player

Vampire Therapist is a 2024 narrative adventure game and visual novel developed and published by Little Bat Games. It was released on July 18, 2024, for Windows, macOS, and Linux, and on February 17, 2026 for Nintendo Switch, PlayStation 4, and PlayStation 5. The game received positive reviews and was nominated for a BAFTA Games Award.

== Gameplay ==
In the game, players take control of Sam Walls, a reformed Wild West gunslinger vampire who becomes a therapist to help other vampires through their psychological struggles. The gameplay combines visual novel elements with educational therapy concepts, specifically cognitive behavioral therapy (CBT). Players learn to identify and address "cognitive distortions" in their vampire clients' thinking patterns, using real therapeutic techniques that have been vetted by licensed therapists. The game features characters from various historical periods, including ancient Greece, Renaissance Italy, Tudor England, and the Bronze Age, each with their own emotional baggage and psychological challenges. Players progress through therapy sessions by selecting appropriate therapeutic responses and concepts to help their clients achieve better mental health.

== Plot ==
Sam Walls is a vampire who was originally a Wild West gunslinger. After centuries of bloodshed and violence, Sam realizes there must be more to immortal existence than "blood, lace, and leather." Seeking a new purpose, he travels to Germany where he meets Andromachos, a 3,000-year-old vampire who has trained in the art of therapy. Under Andromachos's guidance and mentorship, Sam learns therapeutic techniques and begins working with vampire clients in a gothic nightclub setting called Immernacht.

Throughout the game, Sam encounters various vampire clients, each representing different historical periods and psychological challenges. These include self-hating vampires, agoraphobic social media addicts, supernatural narcissists, and victims of centuries-old capitalistic systems. Each client brings their own unique backstory tied to significant historical events and periods, allowing Sam to explore how trauma and psychological patterns persist across centuries of immortal existence.

The narrative explores themes of self-acceptance, healing from trauma, and finding purpose in existence. As Sam helps his clients work through their issues using cognitive behavioral therapy techniques, he also confronts his own past and learns to accept himself. The game balances dark comedy with sincere therapeutic concepts, creating what developers describe as a "cozy self-introspection with a dark European goth vibe."

== Development ==
Vampire Therapist was developed by Little Bat Games, a Berlin-based studio founded by writer and voice actor Cyrus Nemati in 2022. The concept originated from a conversation about what vampires "should" do over the centuries.

== Reception ==
Reception

Aggregate scores
Aggregator	Score
Metacritic	81/100
OpenCritic	71% recommend

Review score
Publication	Score
Checkpoint Gaming	85/100

The game received positive reviews for its innovative approach to combining entertainment with mental health education. Critics praised the writing, voice acting, and the game's respectful treatment of therapy concepts. 71% of critics recommended it according to OpenCritic.

Melissa Brinks of Sidequest praised the game's "gorgeous character sprites, wonderful voice acting, and charming writing," noting that "Vampire Therapist may have a few rough spots, but I found myself looking forward to playing it each night." Checkpoint Gaming awarded the game 85/100, stating "Vampire Therapist is an incredibly fun play; all the characters are vibrant and interesting, the voice acting is outstanding the entire way through."

=== Accolades ===
Year	Ceremony	Category	Result	Ref.
2025	Games for Change Award	Best in Health and Wellness	Won	
2025	21st British Academy Games Awards	Game Beyond Entertainment	Nominated	
