= Animal Well =

2024 video game

- Developer: Shared Memory
- Publisher: Bigmode
- Programmer: Billy Basso
- Platforms: Nintendo Switch; PlayStation 5; Windows; Xbox Series X/S
- Release: Switch, PS5, Windows; May 9, 2024; Xbox Series X/S; October 17, 2024
- Genres: Metroidvania, puzzle
- Mode: Single-player

Animal Well is a 2024 Metroidvania puzzle-platformer video game developed by Billy Basso as Shared Memory and published by Bigmode. The player controls an unnamed blob creature and explores an underground animal-filled labyrinth which incorporates nonlinear platforming and puzzle solving. The game is presented as an interconnected set of rooms, or flip-screens, with 2D pixel art. No plot or backstory is given, and the game world is filled with puzzles and secrets, including some puzzles that require groups of players working in collaboration or several playthroughs to solve.

Billy Basso developed Animal Well, his first solo work, over the course of seven years. He planned the game as he developed it by inventing mechanics and deriving puzzles from their interactions. The design aesthetics were inspired by gardens and urban areas around Chicago, as well as his own artwork. Basso developed the entire game himself, including the underlying engine; he partnered with Dan Adelman after four years of development to handle marketing, and partnered with Bigmode a year later as their first published game, after YouTuber Jason Gastrow (videogamedunkey) saw Animal Well at a festival.

Animal Well was released for Nintendo Switch, PlayStation 5, and Windows in May 2024, and for Xbox Series X/S in October. It released to critical acclaim, especially for its aesthetics and layered puzzles, and was featured in several lists of the best games of 2024. It won Outstanding Achievement in Game Direction at the 28th Annual D.I.C.E. Awards, and was nominated for numerous categories at multiple awards ceremonies, including at the Game Awards 2024, the 25th Game Developers Choice Awards, and the 21st British Academy Games Awards.

== Gameplay ==
A room featuring animals and statues. A save point telephone is in the center with a ladder leading down to another room. The player has four hearts and is holding one firecracker.

Animal Well is a 2D Metroidvania video game incorporating nonlinear platforming and puzzle solving. It is presented in low-resolution pixel art graphics. The player controls an unnamed yellow blob creature which emerges from a flower at the beginning of the game and uses it to explore; no goal, plot, or backstory is given. The game world is divided into a sixteen by sixteen grid of underground rooms, or flip-screens, with one room visible at a time. The rooms are connected together in a labyrinth with multiple obvious and hidden connections. These rooms are typically murky areas with overgrown, crumbling architecture, machines and controls, and various animals generally much larger than the player character.

The player character can walk and jump around the rooms, and can take and use items found in the game. These items are toys, including a slinky, frisbee, and bubble wand; these often have multiple uses, not all of which are immediately obvious. Portions of the game world can only be accessed by using specific items and many areas have hidden elements that require items to access. There are also firecrackers, which can be collected at points in the game and thrown to scare animals or banish ghost animals until the player leaves the room. Matches can also be found, which can be placed in specific locations to permanently banish any ghosts from that room.

Animals and ghosts may ignore the player or harm them, either passively or actively, depending on the type of creature. If the player is attacked by animals or ghosts, they lose one of their hearts. The player starts with four hearts, which can be restored by finding and eating a pink fruit. Up to four additional blue hearts can be gained by eating blue fruits. If the player loses all hearts, they reappear at the last telephone they interacted with, acting as save points throughout the game.

In four locations, colored flames are kept behind large animals, which must be defeated using the local environment for the flame to be collected. If all four are taken and brought to a central room, then a new passageway is opened to a previously inaccessible area. At the end of it is an encounter with a wraith-like manticore creature; once defeated, the credits are shown as the first ending, and the player is then free to continue to explore.

After the first ending are three more "layers" of the game, or sets of puzzles to solve. The second layer is intended for "discovery and secret-oriented players" and requires finding secret areas and collecting secret items, including all of the hidden eggs, and leads to a second showing of the credits. A third layer involves finding all hidden bunnies and introduces alternate reality game (ARG) elements, including one puzzle which requires combining partial solutions from at least fifty players to solve. A fourth layer involves items only unlockable through repeat playthrough challenges, such as speedrunning, as well as specific undocumented actions.

== Development and release ==
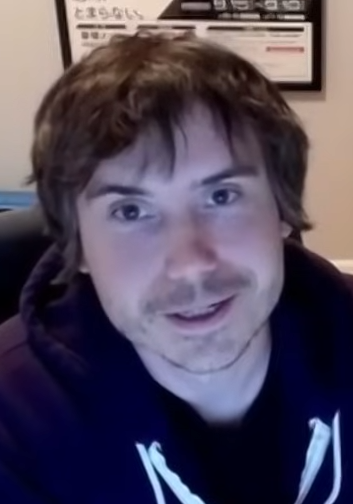
Billy Basso in 2024

Billy Basso began development in 2017. Basso had previously worked for mobile developers such as Phosphor Games and NetherRealm Studios on multiplayer free-to-play games, which he described as teaching him technical skills. He also mentioned that he would rather create single player experiences that "respected the player's time." Basso's first priority when he started the game as a side project was the creation of gameplay systems, with the world crafted afterwards to justify them. To that end, he drew inspiration from games of his childhood that he saw as having similar ideas, such as Super Mario Bros. 2 (1988) and the Metroid and The Legend of Zelda series. He was also inspired by Fez (2012), The Witness (2016), and Tunic (2022), for their sense of discovery and for hiding secrets in plain sight. He soon had a 2D platformer with similar pixel graphics to the final game, along with the blob player character. Basso did not have a planned design before starting, but instead created it as he developed the game.

During the first year of development, Basso was inspired by things he saw on walks around Chicago, such as lawn ornaments or animal statues, as well as overgrown spaces. He found himself drawing animals, architectural spaces, and water and earth motifs in his personal artwork, and combined these into the game design. He knew that he did not want to have humans in the game, but felt that animals were universally relatable. A year into development, Basso named the project Animal Well due to its descriptive but ambiguous nature, as he wanted to give players the feeling of mystery and of uncovering things in familiar places. He then spent another year expanding the game; he created mechanics first and then came up with puzzles that used their interactions.

Basso did not use any existing game engine, instead building the entire project from scratch in C++ as he wanted to understand and be in control of the underlying game systems and only have elements in the code that applied to Animal Well. He set several restrictions on himself when designing the game that led to the aesthetic and gameplay design, such as a lack of standard weapons resulting in the use of non-violent tools, a limited resolution causing unique lighting aesthetics, and no cutscenes, forcing the environment to convey all information to the player. Basso did much of the game's animation using procedural animation in code rather than traditional animation techniques, which resulted in what he felt was an "unsettling" effect.

In December 2019, Basso showcased Animal Well for the first time at an International Game Developers Association event, where it received positive attention. At that point, given how much effort he was putting into it, he wanted the project to result in a completed product. He found, however, that he did not enjoy marketing the game or posting about it. In early 2021, he emailed Dan Adelman, who had handled business management and marketing for several indie titles by small teams, such as Axiom Verge 2 (2021). Adelman was surprised by how far along the project was and intrigued by it, and joined Basso to form Shared Memory. Basso moved to working on Animal Well full time; in February 2022 the game received previews from IGN and the PlayStation blog.

In June 2022, Animal Well was showcased at the Day of the Devs indie game festival; this led to an increase in attention from players, including hundreds of people joining the game's Discord server to collaboratively solve the puzzles in the announcement video. YouTuber Jason Gastrow (videogamedunkey) made a video about the event highlighting the game which drove more interest. It also led to Gastrow's wife Leah contacting Shared Memory and mentioning that the pair were planning to launch an indie game publishing company, Bigmode. Basso intended to self-publish, primarily to avoid losing any creative control, but agreed to partner with Bigmode with Animal Well as their first game after meeting the pair.

As attention on Animal Well increased, Basso increased its scope, even though Adelman suggested to him that the game was nearing a complete state. Basso was committed to not adding any additional content after release, as he wanted it to be a single artifact with a start and an end like his inspirations, and so wanted to ensure all of his ideas made it into the game before launch. He did not want parts of the world to be locked away until players found an item, which meant that players could find areas at different points in their playthroughs and each room could involve multiple game mechanics. As a result, as he added new mechanics, existing areas had to be reworked to account for them, resulting in Basso creating around three times as many rooms as were included in the final game. Adelman and the Gastrows playtested new builds of the game with little direction from Basso; he told them some secrets to ensure they were tested, but kept others a mystery. He created some puzzles to be as difficult as he could make them, as he was worried that players were already solving puzzles just from seeing preview videos, but was convinced by Adelman to make others less "evil" and obscure.

Animal Well was released for Nintendo Switch, PlayStation 5, and Windows on May 9, 2024, and for Xbox Series X/S on October 17, 2024. A vinyl record of the soundtrack, along with a book on the art and development of the game, is planned for release by Lost in Cult in 2026. Upon the release of Animal Well, the game's file size, below 40 megabytes on Windows, was noted as particularly small and smaller than the game's background image on PlayStation 5. In response, Basso said that the file size was not intentional, but a consequence of the game engine and procedural graphics. Basso was surprised by the level of widespread appeal for players as he thought it would be more of a niche game. He also thought some puzzles would take players years to solve, but they were solved in the first month due to community collaboration between thousands of players.

== Reception ==
Reception

Aggregate scores
Aggregator	Score
Metacritic	(PC) 90/100 (Switch) 90/100 (PS5) 88/100
OpenCritic	98% recommend

Review scores
Publication	Score
Eurogamer	5/5
Game Informer	9/10
GameSpot	9/10
GamesRadar+	4.5/5
IGN	9/10
PC Gamer (US)	90/100

Animal Well received "universal acclaim", according to the review aggregator Metacritic. It was ranked as the second-highest rated game of 2024 by aggregated score for Nintendo Switch, in the top 10 for Windows, and in the top 15 for PlayStation 5. Animal Well was featured in several game of the year and indie game of the year lists for 2024. Basso estimated in August 2024 that the game had sold around 650,000 copies for Windows, PlayStation 5, and Nintendo Switch.

Critics highly praised the gameplay. Christian Donlan of Eurogamer said that the game was "filled with revelation and moments of smart pleasure", and Jon Bailes of GamesRadar+ praised that the level design encouraged finding clever solutions to the puzzles. Charlie Wacholz of Game Informer said that the game "pleased, surprised, or scared me with something new at every turn" and called it a "masterclass of environmental design". Rebekah Valentine of IGN and Russ Frushtick of Polygon praised the intricate layers of secrets, and IGN and Richard Wakeling of GameSpot liked how the interconnected nature of the map allowed for moving between puzzles and areas. GameSpot praised the platforming as being precise, though noted its general lack of difficulty. IGN, Polygon, and Shaun Prescott of PC Gamer all praised the second layer of puzzles, calling it a second, larger game hidden within the first and a "puzzle-solver's and scavenger-hunter's dream". Different reviewers reported different negatives to the gameplay; Game Informer found the last section of layer one "stale", GameSpot felt that there were a few places with laborious backtracking upon death, and PC Gamer found the map difficult to use.

The aesthetics of the game were also highly praised, with Game Informer saying that it "establishes itself with a rare, masterful sense of place". They praised the variety and level of detail of the environment, which was echoed by GameSpot, IGN, and Polygon. IGN, Polygon, and PC Gamer all applauded the "meticulous" crafting of the pixel art, and GameSpot praised the interactions between the art and the animation. GamesRadar+ highlighted the lighting as the best visual feature. Eurogamer and GameSpot also praised the designs of the animals for their "dreamlike quality". IGN, PC Gamer, and Polygon noted the ambient soundtrack and noises impact on the overall atmosphere of the game, though IGN wished there was more music. Many reviewers concluded that Animal Well had a substantial depth to it that the aesthetics greatly enhanced.

=== Awards ===
Animal Well won the Outstanding Achievement in Game Direction award at the 28th Annual D.I.C.E. Awards. It was nominated for several other categories at that awards ceremony, as well as for multiple categories at other ceremonies such as the 42nd Golden Joystick Awards, The Game Awards 2024, the 25th Game Developers Choice Awards, and the 21st British Academy Games Awards. It also received honorable mentions at the 23rd Independent Games Festival Awards and Game Developers Choice Awards.

Awards and nominations
Award	Category	Result	Ref.
42nd Golden Joystick Awards	Ultimate Game of the Year	Nominated	
42nd Golden Joystick Awards	Best Indie Game	Nominated	
42nd Golden Joystick Awards	PC Game of the Year	Nominated	
The Game Awards 2024	Best Independent Game	Nominated	
The Game Awards 2024	Best Debut Indie Game	Nominated	
28th Annual D.I.C.E. Awards	Outstanding Achievement in Game Direction	Won	
28th Annual D.I.C.E. Awards	Adventure Game of the Year	Nominated	
28th Annual D.I.C.E. Awards	Outstanding Achievement for an Independent Game	Nominated	
28th Annual D.I.C.E. Awards	Outstanding Achievement in Game Design	Nominated	
23rd Independent Games Festival Awards	Seumas McNally Grand Prize	Honorable mention	
23rd Independent Games Festival Awards	Excellence in Design	Honorable mention	
23rd Independent Games Festival Awards	Excellence in Audio	Honorable mention	
25th Game Developers Choice Awards	Best Design	Nominated	
25th Game Developers Choice Awards	Best Audio	Nominated	
25th Game Developers Choice Awards	Best Debut	Nominated	
25th Game Developers Choice Awards	Best Visual Art	Nominated	
25th Game Developers Choice Awards	Innovation Award	Nominated	
25th Game Developers Choice Awards	Game of the Year	Honorable mention	
25th Game Developers Choice Awards	Best Technology	Honorable mention	
21st British Academy Games Awards	Game Design	Nominated	
21st British Academy Games Awards	Audio Achievement	Nominated	
21st British Academy Games Awards	Debut Game	Nominated	
21st British Academy Games Awards	New Intellectual Property	Nominated	
