= Warhammer 40,000: Space Marine 2 =

2024 video game

- Developer: Saber St. Petersburg
- Publisher: Focus Entertainment
- Directors: Dmitry Grigorenko; Oliver Hollis-Leick
- Producer: Aleksey Tkachev
- Designer: Anatolii Koruka
- Programmer: Efim Plotnikov
- Artist: Dmitry Kholodov
- Writers: Craig Sherman; Oliver Hollis-Leick
- Composers: Nima Fakhrara; Steve Molitz
- Series: Warhammer 40,000
- Engine: Swarm Engine
- Platforms: PlayStation 5 Windows; Xbox Series X/S; Nintendo Switch 2
- Release: 9 September 2024
- Genres: Third-person shooter, hack and slash
- Modes: Single-player, multiplayer

Warhammer 40,000: Space Marine 2 (Note: Stylized as Warhammer 40,000: Space Marine II) is a 2024 third-person shooter with hack and slash elements developed by Saber Interactive Inc. and published by Focus Entertainment. The sequel to Warhammer 40,000: Space Marine (2011), it was released for PlayStation 5, Windows, and Xbox Series X/S on 9 September 2024. The game received generally positive reviews from critics. A sequel to the game is in development.

== Gameplay ==
Space Marine 2 is a hack and slash third-person shooter whose campaign can be played cooperatively with two other players.

The player controls Titus, a lieutenant of the Ultramarines chapter and returning protagonist from the first game. Titus is accompanied by fellow Space Marines Brother Chairon and Sergeant Gadriel throughout the campaign, who can be controlled by other players in the game's cooperative multiplayer mode or by artificial intelligence (AI) in single player. Additionally, the player can fight alongside imperial guard foot soldiers controlled by AI throughout sections of the game. The player engages enemies using a mix of both melee and ranged combat from a third-person point of view. Players can parry an opponent's attack, and riposte with a devastating gun strike, though some attacks are unblockable and therefore must be dodged. The player character is protected by armor, when his armor breaks, his health will start dropping when he is attacked. Health will only replenish when the player recovers medkits in the game's battlefield, or uses certain high-level abilities, his armor, however, can be regenerated by performing an execution on an enemy. If a character's health is depleted they will drop to the ground and bleed out for 30 seconds during which they can be revived by a teammate, if the player is not revived in time or goes down for a second time, they will full die and have to wait for a countdown before returning to battle.

The game also supports separate multiplayer modes, split into 3-player cooperative PvE (player versus environment) and 12-player competitive PvP (player versus player). These include: "Operations", the main cooperative experience, in which you play in missions parallel to the main story; "Stratagems", which offers variations of operations missions with added random modifiers; "Siege Mode", an endless rogue-like mode in which your team is tasked with defending an imperial fortification for as long as possible; and "Annihilation, Seize Ground, Capture and Control and Helbrute Onslaught", in which players take part in a large 6v6 brawl between the forces of the Imperium and Chaos. Players can choose from seven different character classes (Tactical, Assault, Vanguard, Bulwark, Sniper, Heavy, Techmarine), and freely customize their player avatar with various cosmetic items.

== Synopsis ==
=== Setting ===
The game is set in the early 42nd Millennium during the Era Indomitus, the Age of the Dark Imperium. After the return of Roboute Guilliman, the Primarch of the Ultramarines, the Imperium of Man has launched a galaxy-wide, decade-long campaign known as the Indomitus Crusade with the goal of reclaiming lost worlds from its enemies and bringing it back from the brink of collapse. However, when it seems that the Imperium have gained the upper hand, an alien race known as the Tyranids of Hive Fleet Leviathan emerge from the western part of the galaxy and in greater numbers than ever before. This starts the Fourth Tyrannic War.

The game's main enemies are the Tyranids (believed to be a splinter of Leviathan) and the forces of Chaos. The Tyranids are an extragalactic insectoid race whose sole purpose is to consume all forms of biomatter. The forces of Chaos in the game are dedicated to Tzeentch, the Chaos God of sorcery and manipulation, and consist largely of human cultists, renegade soldiers and mutants; their elites are the Thousand Sons Traitor Legion, Chaos Space Marines dedicated to Tzeentch, made up of "Rubric Marines" (suits of Space Marine armour animated by the souls of their former wearers) and Sorcerers.

After the events of the first game, Demetrian Titus (Clive Standen), former Captain of the Ultramarines Chapter's 2nd Company, was imprisoned by Inquisitor Thrax on charges of heresy due to his resistance to the powers of Chaos. Although he was deemed free of Chaos taint, Inquisitor Thrax continued to imprison Titus under torture for a century. Thrax was later killed by the Grey Knights, a chapter of daemon-hunting Space Marines associated with the Inquisition, after being possessed by a Daemon, and other members of the Inquisition freed Titus and offered him the chance to return to the Ultramarines. Titus, believing that he had disgraced his Chapter, instead chose self-imposed penance by becoming a Blackshield and joining the Deathwatch (an Inquisitorial order composed of Space Marines from multiple chapters, dedicated to hunting and exterminating alien threats).

=== Plot ===
Titus (known as Blackshield "Nullus") leads a Deathwatch kill team to the Recidious System, responding to an Adeptus Mechanicus distress call on the jungle world of Kadaku, home to a classified operation known as "Project Aurora". On approach, the Deathwatch transport is destroyed by Tyranids, and Titus is the only survivor. Titus succeeds in his mission, but is mortally wounded and recovered by the Ultramarines. Waking up aboard the battle barge Resilient, Titus is met by the Chaplain in service, who explains that Marneus Calgar, the Ultramarines Chapter Master, ordered that Titus' life be saved by subjecting him to the "Rubicon Primaris", making him a more powerful Primaris Space Marine. Though Titus wishes to return to the Deathwatch, the Chaplain reminds him that he was declared free of Chaos taint by the Inquisition, but he must return to his Chapter and regain their favor if he truly seeks redemption.

After re-inducting him into the Ultramarines as a Lieutenant, the Chaplain orders Titus to keep his past a secret and to report to Sevastus Acheran, the current Captain of the 2nd Company. Acheran is skeptical of Titus' reinstatement, but gives him command of a squad, which includes Sergeant Valorem Gadriel, who distrusts Titus for his hidden past, and Brother Meduras Chairon, a first-generation Primaris created after the Horus Heresy 10,000 years earlier. The team, backed up by the elite Cadian 8th regiment, is tasked with evacuating the Mechanicus personnel, including Archmagos Nozick Beta-12, who refuses to leave until data related to Project Aurora is retrieved from his research facility. While the operation is successful, the gunship transporting him crashes in Tyranid territory. Titus and his squad race to save Nozick but find him already dead. Surveying the wreckage, they discover that Nozick was not slain by Tyranids but by the forces of Chaos. Before they leave, a squad of Ultramarines transport a mysterious object from the wreckage that causes Titus to lose consciousness.

Acheran then orders Titus to go to Avarax, the system's other inhabited planet, to retrieve Nozick's apprentice Morias Leuze, who can continue work on Project Aurora. They reach an Adeptus Mechanicus facility and Titus accesses a cogitator that gives him Leuze's location. Suspicious of the mysterious object, Titus searches the cogitator and discovers to his horror that Project Aurora is a weapon powered by the Chaos "Power Source" he destroyed on Graia over a century earlier. Titus returns to the Resilient to confront Acheran, demanding that the project be stopped, but Acheran refuses as the Mechanicus are working under the orders of Primarch Guilliman himself. Returning to Avarax, the Ultramarines find Leuze's facility surrounded by both the Tyranids and the forces of Chaos, led by the Thousand Sons Traitor Legion; they are able to fight their way through and escort Leuze to the Resilient. Gadriel's suspicion of Titus is raised after Leuze unwittingly reveals to them Titus' history on Graia.

Titus urges Acheran to contact Lord Calgar, but the Astropathic Relay which would allow them to send a message is currently overrun by Tyranids. Titus fights his way to the Relay, and meets with Astropath Neoma who offers to send a message to Calgar. As she sends the message, Neoma suddenly accuses Titus of being a traitor and trying to lure Calgar to the planet to kill him. A suspicious Gadriel attacks Titus but stops as Chairon shoots Neoma, recognizing her as possessed by Chaos in the process of sending the message. Her body explodes in Warp energy which reveals Imurah, a Thousand Sons Sorcerer Lord, who battles the Ultramarines before escaping. Upon returning to the Resilient, Acheran informs Titus that the Thousand Sons have appeared all over the Recidious System and are focusing on the burial world of Demerium, where Project Aurora is based.

Titus and Gadriel make amends before they assault Demerium. As they descend into the planet core, it is revealed that the planet is also a Necron Tomb World. They reach Leuze, who reveals that by combining Necron and Mechanicus technology with the Power Source, Project Aurora will allow them to negate and banish all those touched by Chaos, across the entire galaxy. Leuze activates the machine and seemingly vaporizes Imurah, but the sorcerer reappears and kills Leuze, revealing that he influenced the Mechanicus into creating Project Aurora. He steals the artifact and uses it to create a massive rift to the immaterium to summon reinforcements. Reuniting with Acheran, the team attempts to close the rifts by destroying several obelisks that empower it. They are nearly overwhelmed, but are saved by the arrival of Lord Calgar and his Ultramarine forces. During the battle, Calgar, Titus and his team enters the rift and battle Imurah. While Imurah is distracted, Titus again destroys the Power Source, killing the sorcerer.

Returning to the Resilient, the Ultramarines celebrate their victory, and Calgar invites Titus to join him on a new mission on recommendation of the Chaplain. As he departs with the Chaplain accompanying, the Chaplain reveals himself to be Leandros, Titus' former subordinate who had reported him to the Inquisition; Leandros acknowledges Titus' accomplishments, but notes that suspicion never completely fades and that he will be watching Titus should he fall to corruption.

== Development ==
Warhammer 40,000: Space Marine II was announced on 9 December 2021 with a cinematic trailer at The Game Awards 2021. It was confirmed that Captain Titus was making his return and has become a Primaris Space Marine. The game takes place in Games Workshop's Warhammer 40,000 universe and features the Ultramarines chapter of Space Marines. The Tyranids are featured as enemies. It was also announced that the voice role of Titus had been recast (he was voiced by Mark Strong in the original game), and he would be voiced by Clive Standen. A gameplay reveal was shown at The Game Awards 2022.

In June 2023, at Summer Game Fest 2023, it was confirmed the campaign would feature three player co-op with either other players or AI, it was additionally revealed that the game was set for a 'winter' 2023 release. A gameplay trailer was released at the end of August, as well as confirmation that there would be a beta release.

== Marketing and release ==
In September 2023, Games Workshop released a board game based on the game which includes a miniature model of Titus. In November, Games Workshop and Wētā Workshop revealed several statuettes in the works, with one of them being a statuette of Titus with interchangeable weapons and heads.

Space Marine II was originally scheduled to release for PlayStation 5, Windows, and Xbox Series X/S in 2023, before being delayed to 9 September 2024. In June 2024, developer Saber Interactive announced that the planned beta was cancelled in order to focus on getting the game ready for the launch date.

Multiple retail editions containing extra content were released for the game:

- The "Collector's Edition" contains the base game along with the Macragge’s Chosen DLC as well as physical extras including a resin statuette of Lieutenant Titus with an interchangeable head, an official steelbook case, and a 64-page artbook.
- The "Gold Edition" contains the base game and the season pass.
- The "Ultra Edition" contains all the contents of the "Gold Edition" along with the Ultramarines Champion Pack.

== Reception ==
=== Critical reception ===
Reception

Aggregate scores
Aggregator	Score
Metacritic	(PC) 82/100 (PS5) 80/100 (XSXS) 83/100
OpenCritic	86% recommend

Review scores
Publication	Score
Eurogamer	4/5
Game Informer	8/10
GamesRadar+	4/5
Hardcore Gamer	4/5
IGN	8/10
PC Gamer (US)	60/100
PCGamesN	6/10
Push Square	9/10
VG247	4/5

Warhammer 40,000: Space Marine II received "generally favorable" reviews from critics, according to review aggregator website Metacritic, and 87% of critics recommended the game, according to OpenCritic. The game attracted more than 2 million players on its launch day. By October 16, 2024, the game had sold 4.5 million copies. As of April 16, 2026, the player count surpassed 12 million.

=== Awards ===
Year	Award	Category	Result	Ref.
2024	Golden Joystick Awards 2024	Best Visual Design	Nominated	
2024	The Game Awards 2024	Best Action Game	Nominated	
2024	The Game Awards 2024	Best Multiplayer	Nominated	
2024	The Steam Awards 2024	Game of the Year	Nominated	
2024	The Steam Awards 2024	Better With Friends	Nominated	
2025	28th Annual D.I.C.E. Awards	Online Game of the Year	Nominated	
2025	28th Annual D.I.C.E. Awards	Outstanding Achievement in Animation	Nominated	
2025	28th Annual D.I.C.E. Awards	Outstanding Technical Achievement	Nominated	
2025	21st British Academy Games Awards	Best Game	Longlisted	
2025	21st British Academy Games Awards	Animation	Nominated	
2025	21st British Academy Games Awards	Game Design	Longlisted	
2025	21st British Academy Games Awards	Multiplayer	Nominated	
2025	21st British Academy Games Awards	Technical Achievement	Nominated	
2025	21st British Academy Games Awards	Performer in a Leading Role (Clive Standen as Titus)	Longlisted	
2025	21st British Academy Games Awards	Performer in a Supporting Role (Adam McNamara as Acheran)	Longlisted	
2025	6th Pégases Awards	Best Foreign Video Game	Won	
2026	22nd British Academy Games Awards	Evolving Game	Nominated	

== Sequel ==
A sequel to the game, titled as "Warhammer 40,000: Space Marine 3", was announced in March 2025 by Focus Entertainment and Saber Interactive.
