= Botany Manor =

2024 puzzle video game

- Steam header art
- Developer: Balloon Studios
- Publisher: Whitethorn Games
- Director: Laure De Mey
- Designers: Laure De Mey, Kitt Byrne
- Artists: Tim Steer, Kitt Byrne, Jim Bending
- Composer: Thomas Williams
- Engine: Unity
- Platforms: Nintendo Switch; Microsoft Windows; Xbox One; Xbox Series X/S; PlayStation 4; PlayStation 5; Android; iOS; Nintendo Switch 2
- Release: Switch, Windows, Xbox One, Series X/S; 9 April 2024; PS4, PS5; 28 January 2025; Android, iOS; 5 February 2026; Switch 2; 2 July 2026
- Genre: Puzzle
- Mode: Single-player

Botany Manor is a 2024 video game developed by English independent developer Balloon Studios and published by Whitethorn Games. The game is a puzzle title in which players explore a period English countryside manor to cultivate magical flora. Upon release, Botany Manor received generally positive reviews, with critics praising the game's environmental design, tone and pacing.

== Gameplay ==
Set in 1890, players assume the role of Arabella Greene, a retired botanist and inheritor of a Somerset manor who is undertaking research on plants in preparation of publishing a book about the world's 'Forgotten Flora'. Players complete point-and-click puzzles across several chapters by growing one or more plants, in turn completing sections of Greene's book. Plants in the game have magical qualities that respond to certain behaviors, such as light or temperature, with the player changing these environmental conditions to allow the plants to bloom. Clues on how to grow plants are dispersed throughout the areas of the manor in each stage and collected in a notebook. When a plant successfully blooms, the notebook will reveal an illustration and more details, and unlock progression to the next stage, often where a key to a new room of the manor is delivered.

== Development ==
Botany Manor was developed by Balloon Studios, a Devon-based team founded by Laure De Mey, who had previously worked with Ustwo Games, the developers of Monument Valley. De Mey stated that the inspiration of the game was to explore a setting for a manor, with the house of naturalist Charles Darwin, Down House and the fictitious manor of Lara Croft in the Tomb Raider series serving as inspiration for the design. The late nineteenth century was pursued as a setting to capture the "era of great scientific discovery", and provide a "feasible" premise for creating a puzzle game about fantastical botany. Development of the game pursued a "clear and straightforward" approach to puzzle design and difficulty with the stated aim of designing a "nice peaceful setting" and gameplay that struck a balance between being "not too challenging, but obviously not too simple" to minimise "strain on the player". Balloon Studios announced the game at a Nintendo Indie World event for the Nintendo Switch in November 2022, and was published on its announced released date of 9 February 2024 for the Nintendo Switch, Windows, Xbox One, and Xbox Series X/S.

== Reception ==
Reception

Aggregate scores
Aggregator	Score
Metacritic	84/100
OpenCritic	91% recommend

Review scores
Publication	Score
Famitsu	29/40
IGN	8/10
Nintendo Life	9/10 stars
Shacknews	9/10
CGMagazine	8/10
Digitally Downloaded	4/5 stars
Press Start	4/5 stars
Windows Central	4/5 stars

According to review aggregator platform Metacritic, Botany Manor received "generally favorable" reviews from critics. Fellow review aggregator OpenCritic assessed that the game received strong approval, being recommended by 91% of critics. In Japan, four critics from Famitsu gave the game a total score of 29 out of 40. Reviewers praised the game's execution of its botanic theme and environmental design, with comparisons to botanical games such as Strange Horticulture, or games set in open environments such as The Witness. Larryn Bell of Shacknews described the game's themes as highlighting the "overall interconnectedness of nature" and influence of environment on wellbeing, although expressed that plants could have had more utility in the game. Alice Bell of Rock Paper Shotgun commended the game's design of a "bright" and "bouncy" world, writing that "the developers have clearly taken pains to make it a nice place to be". Digitally Downloaded similarly praised the game's "beautifully crafted" world, finding the music and sound to "work harmoniously with the game's visuals". Saniya Ahmed of IGN described the scenery as "picturesque" and "quaint", finding the environmental details of the game's various "pamphlets, bottle labels, (and) advertisements" as conveying a "vintage charm", although finding the manor's space to feel empty.

Many critics remarked on the game's sedate and relaxing pacing. Kate Gray of Nintendo Life characterised the game as part of a genre of "cozy and wholesome" titles focused on "cultivation and creation" in opposition to those of "violence and conflict" predicated in most genres. Larryn Bell of Shacknews noted the game was "wholesome" and "laid-back" and allowed players to complete it at their own pace. Digitally Downloaded praised the game as "cozy", citing the lack of time limits and the game's ability to "gently prod you in the right direction".

The game's narrative was mostly praised by reviewers. Larryn Bell of Shacknews considered the "nuanced storytelling" through letters, notes and objects to tell a "thoughtful" and "poignant tale" about overcoming adversity and discrimination in the context of the late nineteenth century. Alice Bell of Rock Paper Shotgun similarly noted the existence of a subtle narrative "that suggests a full but frustrating life" but made the conclusion more satisfying for those players paying attention. However, Saniya Ahmed of IGN considered the personal story of the protagonist to be "one-note" and "trail behind" due to its reliance on notes, writing that these "fail to dig deep into her emotions".

Some critics observed bugs and quality of life issues. Kate Gray of Nintendo Life considered the game may have benefited from the ability to document clues more thoroughly and clearer location of the player on a map of the mansion. Similarly, Digitally Downloaded noted the need for players to "tediously run all over the place" to reference clues absent these features. Kieron Verbrugge of Press Start experienced "visual bugs" and "glitched achievements" throughout gameplay, although noted these were "small issues" that had "little impact on the actual game. However, Digitally Downloaded praised the game for its accessibility features.
