= Pacific Drive (video game) =

2024 video game

- Developer: Ironwood Studios
- Publisher: Kepler Interactive
- Directors: Cassandra Dracott; Seth Rosen
- Producer: Alyssa Askew
- Designer: Seth Rosen
- Programmers: Zak Blystone; Francesco Dipietro; Scott Kauker
- Writers: Karrie Shao; Paul Dean
- Composer: Wilbert Roget II
- Engine: Unreal Engine 4
- Platforms: PlayStation 5; Windows; Xbox Series X/S
- Release: PlayStation 5, Windows; February 22, 2024; Xbox Series X/S; October 23, 2025
- Genre: Survival
- Mode: Single-player

Pacific Drive is a 2024 survival game developed by Ironwood Studios and published by Kepler Interactive. The game is set in a fictionalized version of the Olympic Peninsula, which the player traverses in a station wagon as they attempt to find a way to escape. It uses a first-person perspective; the player must attempt to avoid anomalies and obstacles. The vehicle can be repaired and customized at the player's garage.

Development of Pacific Drive began in 2019 after the founding of Ironwood Studios. Creative director Cassandra Dracott conceived the idea while driving through the Olympic Peninsula. She considered creating the game independently but realized she would need a team, which she began building during the COVID-19 pandemic. The game was publicly announced in September 2022.

Pacific Drive was released for the PlayStation 5 and Windows in February 2024, and for Xbox Series X/S in October 2025. It received positive reviews from critics, who praised its atmosphere, characters, and vehicle design, but criticized its repetitive and difficult gameplay. The game garnered several award nominations and sold over one million units by February 2025. A television adaptation was announced in 2024.

== Gameplay ==
Pacific Drive is a survival game played in a first-person perspective. The game is set in 1998 in the Olympic Exclusion Zone, a fictionalized abandoned version of the Olympic Peninsula in Washington, United States, which the player traverses on foot or in a station wagon. The map is laid out in a graph of road junctions that the player can visit with their station wagon; areas contain abandoned buildings and junk vehicles the player can scavenge for resources, which they can store in their car. Junctions contain "anchors", anomalous devices that contain large amounts of energy that, when collected enough of, allow the player to open a gateway back to the garage. After a certain amount of time spent in a junction, or after the gateway is opened, the junction begins to destabilize, and the safe area shrinks, replaced with an area that deals damage over time, forcing the player to leave as soon as possible. Initially, the player may only visit adjacent junctions connected via roads; additional junctions become available to the player once they have successfully used a gateway from a neighboring junction, gradually opening up the map.

The player can customize their vehicle in their auto shop, which acts as their base of operations, and perform repairs either in the auto shop, or while traversing the world. Generic damage can be repaired by either using a limited use "repair putty" or a blowtorch, or by swapping out a damaged part to an intact one. Parts can develop specific damage that may need specialized one-time use items to fix, such as patching flat tires using a sealant, or fixing a broken spark plug; items used for these repairs can be crafted from resources found around the world. The garage's Fabrication Station harvests resources and creates blueprints or special items, including some that discover new routes, add fuel to the car, or destabilize a zone. Tools like a buzzsaw called the Scrapper or an "impact hammer" can be used to harvest resources from other items in the world. The car will occasionally develop "quirks", such as the horn sounding when the steering wheel is turned, or a door opening when the car radio is switched on; to fix a quirk, the player must use an MS-DOS computer called a "Tinker Station" and correctly input both the cause and effect of the quirk.

As the player traverses the world, they encounter various anomalies that affect gameplay: some are dangerous and damage the car or player, others have various effects like temporarily scrambling some of the car controls; others are neutral by default and only help or hinder traversal. Some areas are also irradiated, which harm the player and slowly corrode the car. Additionally, zones can occasionally develop certain conditions that add additional complexity, such as explosions being more powerful or extreme darkness.

== Plot ==
In Washington's Olympic Peninsula in 1947, American researcher Dr. Ophelia "Oppy" Turner, her husband Allen, and her colleagues including scientists Tobias Barlow and Francis Cooke, develop "LIM technology", a revolutionary experimental technology, with the cooperation of the United States government. However, LIM technology experimentation leads to mysterious phenomena and unexplained disappearances in the region, which in 1955 prompts the creation of the U.S. Advanced Resonance Development Agency (ARDA). ARDA establishes the Olympic Exclusion Zone to secretly research the phenomena, referred to as "anomalies", while Oppy and her long-triumphed LIM technology fade from the public interest. Initially consisting of approximately western Clallam County near Forks, the spread of anomalies and the worsening instability of the original Zone leads to its expansion in 1961 and 1967 to eventually cover 3,600 square miles (9,300 km^{2}), almost the entire Peninsula, before being completely evacuated and sealed in 1987 after ARDA's disestablishment.

In 1998, the player, referred to as "the Driver", drives to the Zone's wall, but a roadblock forces them to take a detour through a forest, where a bright light suddenly teleports them into the Outer Zone (the 1967 Zone boundary) and destroys their van. Stumbling through the undergrowth, the Driver finds a still-operational station wagon and is contacted through its radio by Tobias and Francis, who direct the Driver to a garage owned by Oppy, who reluctantly agrees to assist the Driver and let them use the garage. Oppy, Tobias, and Francis explain the nature of anomalies, including one called a "Remnant", which inhabits inanimate objects and forms a psychic link with the host, gradually causing the host to become obsessed with the object to the point of insanity; they deduce the station wagon is a Remnant and agree to help the Driver separate from it and escape the Zone.

Oppy gives the Driver an invention called an ARC device, which can teleport them to the garage in an emergency, and suggests they take the station wagon to a massive anomaly known as "Colossal Cappy" to confirm if it is a Remnant by driving into it, a gambit which succeeds and confirms the station wagon is indeed a Remnant. Francis reveals the interaction between Cappy and the Remnant caused an event called the "Mass Hallucination", and that the signal from the event was equal and opposite to the Remnant and originated in the Deep Zone (the original 1955 Zone boundary), which they believe could cancel out the Remnant. Tobias and Francis have the Driver seek out three anomalies in the Mid Zone (the 1961 Zone boundary) known as "the Murals" to locate the Mass Hallucination source, while Oppy suggests the Driver explore the research facility where her husband Allen died in an experiment that caused the previous Mass Hallucination 40 years prior. The group eventually locates the source within the Deep Zone, but with its disabled power grid making access impossible, they devise a plan to jump start the grid using the station wagon and their own battery supplies; however, when a power surge damages the batteries, Tobias sacrifices himself to complete the plan and get the Driver into the Deep Zone.

In the Deep Zone, Oppy manages to supercharge the ARC device so it can work there. The Driver soon locates and enters the source, known as the Well, and is transported into a bizarre maze of television screens where they overhear past conversations between Oppy, Allen, Francis, and Tobias, as well as a deceased Tobias who leaves a final farewell to Francis and a parting message for Oppy from Allen. The Driver recovers the station wagon in the Well and returns to the garage, where Oppy and Francis reveal they heard everything there and that the Remnant is gone, though the station wagon is still linked to the Driver. After congratulating Francis on his theories (which she had previously dismissed) being correct, Oppy passes on her research and equipment to Francis and the Driver. After which, the Driver finally leaves the Zone, and Oppy makes peace with her husband's death.

== Development and release ==
After working at video game development studios like Sony Online Entertainment, Sucker Punch Productions, and Oculus VR, Cassandra Dracott founded Ironwood Studios in Seattle in 2019 to create her own games. She conceived Pacific Drive while driving through the Olympic Peninsula; she felt driving through the Pacific Northwest "on a lonely road ... and the radio is playing a certain tune, it can be really memorable", comparing it to her childhood in Portland, Oregon. The car is loosely based on Dracott's 1989 Buick Estate and her first car, a Volvo 700-series station wagon. As she began developing a prototype of Pacific Drive, Dracott considered remaining solo but realized she would need a team as the concept began to grow. She began building the team at the beginning of the COVID-19 pandemic in 2020; they moved into their Seattle office in 2022.

The team wanted the player's relationship with their car to be the most essential gameplay factor; lead game designer Seth Rosen said "the car's health is generally a better indicator of how a run is going than your own". They attempted scripted "character building" moments for the vehicle, but determined that unscripted gameplay resonated better. Rosen avoided survival game elements he considered frustrating, such as inventory management and resource grinding. The team designed enemies and events with simplistic independent behaviors that created engaging scenarios when combined. They wanted enemies to be "pretty dangerous" but still allow the player to solve problems creatively while overcoming threats. Initial experiments of enemies controlled through artificial intelligence were scrapped because their behavior was too challenging to read while driving. The world's randomization was inspired by Derek Yu's work on Spelunky and subsequent book for Boss Fight Books. Pacific Drive uses the Unreal Engine 4 game engine.

Pacific Drive was announced on September 13, 2022, during PlayStation's State of Play presentation, alongside its debut trailer. It was originally scheduled to release for the PlayStation 5 and Windows in 2023. A gameplay trailer was released on February 9, 2023. In June, Ironwood Studios announced it had partnered with Kepler Interactive to publish the game. In August, the release window was delayed to early 2024 to allow for additional development without excessive overworking. A story trailer was featured at the PC Gaming Show in November, revealing the release date of February 22, 2024. Downloadable content for the game, titled Whispers in the Woods, was announced in September 2025 and released on October 23, alongside the game's surprise release for Xbox Series X and Series S.

== Reception ==
=== Critical response ===
Reception

Aggregate scores
| Aggregator | Score |
|---|---|
| Metacritic | Win: 79/100; PS5: 77/100 |
| OpenCritic | 80% recommend |

Review scores
| Publication | Score |
|---|---|
| Eurogamer | 4/5 |
| Famitsu | 32/40 |
| GameSpot | 8/10 |
| GamesRadar+ | 3/5 |
| IGN | 7/10 |
| PC Gamer (US) | 86/100 |
| Push Square | 8/10 |
| Shacknews | 9/10 |
| Game World Navigator | 8.1/10 |

Pacific Drive received "generally favorable" reviews from critics, according to review aggregator website Metacritic, and 80% of critics recommend the game according to OpenCritic. In Japan, four critics from Famitsu gave the game a total score of 32 out of 40, with each critic awarding the game an 8 out of 10. GameSpot's Mark Delaney and The Jimquisition's James Stephanie Sterling considered it among the year's best games to date, while Shacknews's TJ Denzer called it "one of the most interesting survival games I've ever played". Game World Navigator's Sergey Pletnev compared it to the novel Roadside Picnic (1972) in its depiction of a world filled with dangerous, incomprehensible anomalies.

PC Gamer's Christopher Livingston considered the station wagon among the best video game vehicles, praising the durability system. Push Square's Stephen Tailby felt the vehicle maintenance added "a great sense of progression", and Shacknews's Denzer enjoyed the car's customizability options but occasionally found it inexplicably awkward to drive. Some reviewers considered the maintenance overwhelming and tiresome; IGN's Sarah Thwaites wrote that "getting stuck with a quirk you can't figure out is a real momentum killer". GameSpot's Delaney found the driving more "engaging and enjoyable" than other games.

Reviewers concurred Pacific Drive's gameplay was enjoyable but often frustrating; GamesRadar+'s Leon Hurley said the "unfair" challenges meant he completed the game "more embittered than empowered". IGN's Thwaites wrote it "often struggles to walk the fine line between being engaging and overcomplicated" by assigning the player too many tasks, ultimately distracting from its enjoyable atmosphere. GameSpot's Delaney found the game "unintentionally obtuse" but commended the accessibility options. Some critics criticized the user interface's tedious and complicated design and controls; Eurogamer's Chris Tapsell felt it "must have at least partially been designed to be deliberately awkward".

Shacknews's Denzer found the Olympic Exclusion Zone "a character in and of itself", praising its beauty and cohesivity. IGN's Thwaites lauded the worldbuilding and use of the Pacific Northwest but felt the repetitive gameplay impacting the narrative pacing. GameSpot's Delaney favorably compared the audio logs to the podcast Serial and found the variety of music enhanced the world's strangeness; GamesRadar+'s Hurley similarly felt the soundtrack amplified the atmosphere. Reviewers praised the "compelling" non-player characters and the enemy designs and behavior. Push Square's Tailby lauded the stylized visuals but criticized the inconsistent frame rate and loading times on the PlayStation 5 version.

=== Sales ===
Pacific Drive had sold over 600,000 units by July 2024, and over one million units by February 2025.

=== Accolades ===
Prior to its release, Pacific Drive was nominated for Most Wanted Game at the Golden Joystick Awards and PC Gaming Show. It was shortlisted for the Narrative/Story-Telling and Creativity in Games awards at the TIGA Games Industry Awards, and nominated for Best Debut Indie Game at the Game Awards 2024 in November. In December, it won Best Music at the inaugural Indie Game Awards, and was longlisted for four awards at the 21st British Academy Games Awards; it was shortlisted for one, Debut Game, in March 2025, and nominated for Best Game Writing at the Nebula Awards.

| Award | Date | Category | Result | Ref. |
|---|---|---|---|---|
| British Academy Games Awards | April 8, 2025 | Debut Game | Nominated | |
| British Academy Games Awards | April 8, 2025 | Game Design | Longlisted | |
| British Academy Games Awards | April 8, 2025 | Narrative | Longlisted | |
| British Academy Games Awards | April 8, 2025 | New Intellectual Property | Longlisted | |
| BIG Festival | June 28, 2024 | Best Gameplay | Won | |
| BIG Festival | June 28, 2024 | Best Game | Nominated | |
| Independent Games Festival Awards | March 19, 2025 | Excellence in Design | Nominated | |
| Independent Games Festival Awards | March 19, 2025 | Excellence in Audio | Honorable Mention | |
| The Game Awards | December 12, 2024 | Best Debut Indie Game | Nominated | |
| Game Developers Choice Awards | March 19, 2025 | Best Debut | Nominated | |
| Golden Joystick Awards | November 20, 2023 | Most Wanted Game | Nominated | |
| Nebula Awards | June 7, 2025 | Best Game Writing | Nominated | |

== Other media ==
In December 2024, Atomic Monster acquired the rights to develop Pacific Drive into a television series, to be executive produced by Atomic Monster's James Wan, Michael Clear, and Rob Hackett, and the Menagerie Productions's Jeff Ludwig.
