= Kind Words (video game) =

2019 casual indie video game

Kind Words (lo fi chill beats to write to)
- Designer: Ziba Scott
- Programmer: Ziba Scott
- Artist: Luigi Guatieri
- Composer: Clark Aboud
- Engine: Unity
- Platforms: Linux, macOS, Windows
- Release: 6 July 2019
- Genre: Casual
- Mode: Multiplayer

Kind Words (lo fi chill beats to write to) is a 2019 casual video game developed by American indie developer Popcannibal, consisting of programmer and designer Ziba Scott and artist Luigi Guatieri. The game was first released as a Humble Bundle Original in July 2019, and was released on Steam in September 2019. In the game, the player can send and request letters to and from other players anonymously over the internet, while lo-fi music plays in the background.

A sequel, Kind Words 2 (lofi city pop), was released on 7 October 2024.

== Gameplay ==
When first opening the game, the player is met by Ella, a mail carrier deer who is nervous of her new job. After writing a short letter to inspire the deer, the player is then asked for their name, of which only the first letter is used in the future. The player can then choose to either write an anonymous letter to someone requesting letters, request letters from other players, or send a paper airplane, with a short message attached.

The only view available is the player's bedroom, which may be used to display physical representations of the player's stickers.

=== Letters ===
The player can anonymously request letters from other players, and can also send a letter to other players who are requesting letters. When a player chooses to write a letter, the player can choose to reply to or skip a request from their queue. Each request is a short statement on a card, and each letter is a message on a piece of paper. The player may also choose to include a sticker among a collection of stickers sent to them by previous players.

When a player receives a letter, it goes into the player's inbox. There, the player can read responses made by other players to their past requests.

Paper airplanes can also be seen flying across the screen. When interacted with, the paper airplane will show the message inside. These paper airplanes can be sent or received by other players, and contain short and usually inspirational messages.

== Reception ==
The game has been praised by multiple reviewers for its positive community. A review for Polygon describes Kind Words as "a simultaneously disarming yet intense experience." A Kotaku review mentions instances of trolling on the game which occur as an effect of livestreaming. Scott addressed this, saying that trolls "rarely hang around long" and that only 3% of most letters were reported, most of which being off-topic content. An A.V. Club writer praised the gameplay and claimed that the community behind it helps make the game "troll-proof."

Following the success of Kind Words, Popcannibal announced a sequel titled Kind Words 2 (lofi city pop). The sequel includes a much more expansive in-game world with more locations besides the player's bedroom. It was released on 7 October 2024.

=== Awards ===
Year	Award	Category	Result	Ref
2019	The Game Awards 2019	Games for Impact	Nominated	
2020	16th British Academy Games Awards	Game Beyond Entertainment	Won	
