= Videogamedunkey =

American YouTuber (born 1991)

videogamedunkey
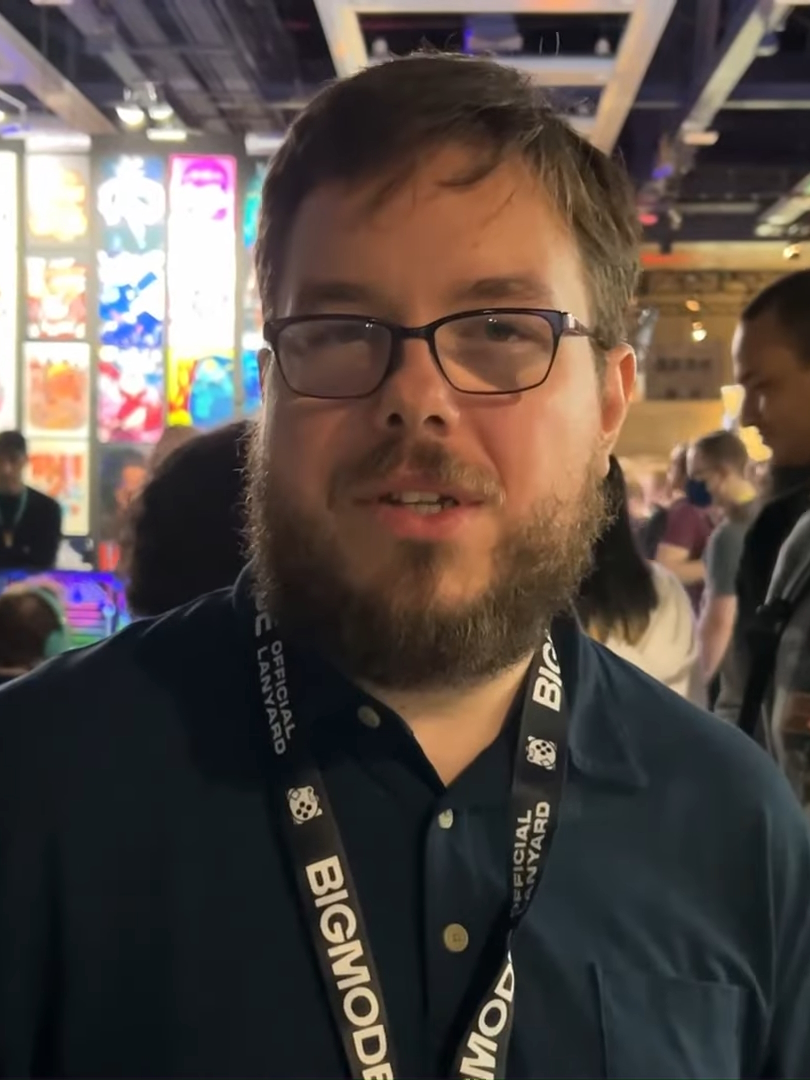
- videogamedunkey in 2024
- Born: Jason Gastrow; January 30, 1991 (age 35)
- Occupations: Comedian; reviewer; Internet personality
- Spouse: Leah (m. 2019)
- Children: 1

YouTube information
- Channel: videogamedunkey
- Years active: 2010–present
- Genres: Gaming; comedy; satire
- Subscribers: 7.57 million
- Views: 4.34 billion
- Last updated: September 12, 2026

Jason Gastrow (born January 30, 1991), known online as videogamedunkey or simply dunkey, is an American YouTuber known for his YouTube skits and video essays that blend humor with video game criticism. As of January 2026, his YouTube channel has over seven million subscribers and he has accumulated over four billion views.

== Internet career ==
Gastrow has been publishing videos online since 2003. Initially, he created Flash animations that he uploaded on the website Newgrounds under the username "MeatwadSprite". Examples include "Great Yoshi Migration", his first video, and a parody of the Village People song "Y.M.C.A." called "F.U.C.K." On the H3 Podcast, Gastrow said he wanted to be an animator when he was young.

Gastrow started his current YouTube channel, videogamedunkey, in 2010, with a video of him performing a speedrun of the 1991 game Battletoads. Gastrow recalled that the name "videogamedunkey" came about when he was playing Left 4 Dead with a friend. He "told him to pet a donkey or something", and after trapping his friend in the game, told him he would release him if he said "go go magic dunk". In a 2015 Reddit thread, Gastrow mentioned that his channel's profile picture was designed by Newgrounds animator and YouTuber Chris O'Neill. By September 2015, the videogamedunkey channel had 1.8 million subscribers. Gastrow's videos have collectively generated over four billion views. Outside of YouTube, Gastrow is active on Twitter (Note: "@vgdunkey" (dunkey) on X (formerly Twitter)) and has pages on Facebook and Reddit. He and his wife Leah also run Dunkey's Castle, an online merchandise shop.

videogamedunkey's YouTube profile picture, drawn by OneyNG

Gastrow primarily covers video games on his channel. This includes posting reviews, playthroughs, video essays, and montages. He has also reviewed films, such as The Shining. During his channel's initial years, Gastrow was primarily known for his coverage of the 2009 multiplayer online battle arena game League of Legends. According to Yannick LeJacq of Kotaku, Gastrow "had a special place in the League of Legends universe for consistently producing some of the best, and definitely the funniest, material in the game's massive community". However, he quit making League videos in September 2015, after he was banned for "toxic" behavior, such as repeatedly insulting other players on his team in the in-game chat. Gastrow is also known for popularizing jokes about Knack (2013) and its sequel Knack II (2017), titles for the PlayStation 4, to the point that the games "became the internet's favorite punchline".

Gastrow initially signed a contract with internet entertainment platform Machinima, Inc., which according to him took a large cut of his earnings from advertising. In 2013, Gastrow switched from Machinima to Maker Studios, which reportedly took more revenue than Machinima. Microsoft offered to pay if he made four videos for Xbox Live's Summer of Arcade. Shortly after Gastrow uploaded his first video, in which he lambasted the game he was playing, Microsoft took down the video, canceled the deal, and according to Gastrow did not pay the money owed, despite previously telling him he could "do whatever he wanted" in the video. Gastrow has since worked with Curse LLC, which he has praised. Gastrow reportedly earns up to US$1.7 million a year, and he is "likely the highest-earning cultural commentator with connections to Madison".

In December 2020, Gastrow released a video in which he stated he would stop making "good videos" and instead switch to a daily schedule. He subsequently released shorter videos on a daily basis that satirized his stated plans and featured clickbait titles. For example, a purported Minecraft video involved Gastrow playing as the default Steve avatar from Minecraft in Super Smash Bros. Ultimate. According to his wife, the switch in content format was because he was "feeling frustrations about the current YouTube landscape and worried about the future", where his and other channels' past curated content has been "overshadowed by the latest trends and low effort stuff" from larger channels. Polygon noted that the videos performed better than Gastrow's previous content, anticipating that he was exemplifying the current problems with YouTube to bring the situation to light and would eventually return to his normal curated content.

In August 2021, Gastrow joked in a live stream that Kanye West's then-upcoming album Donda would sample a song from the animated short film Strawinsky and the Mysterious House (2012); upon the album's release, the track "Remote Control" sampled the exact clip, leading fans to theorize that West's team watched Gastrow's stream.

In November 2022, Gastrow uploaded a video criticizing Sonic Frontiers, which resulted in the game being review bombed on Metacritic. Gastrow stated he did not intend for the video to spark review bombing and accused Sonic fans of leaving negative reviews to make his fans look bad.

== Video game publishing ==
In September 2022, Gastrow and his wife Leah launched Bigmode, a video game publishing company specializing in publishing indie games. Gastrow stated in a video announcing the new company, "I think we're going to bring insane value to the table and the bottom line is: help good games succeed and help them continue to succeed into the future". Leah said their ultimate goal was to "put together a catalogue of unique, high-quality games that can be enjoyed for many years". The announcement received some mixed reactions from journalists and indie developers. In January 2023, Bigmode announced its first title, Animal Well, which was released for Nintendo Switch, PlayStation 5, and Windows in May 2024 and for Xbox Series X/S in October 2024, receiving critical acclaim.

In February 2025, Bigmode released its second title, the bullet hell roguelike Star of Providence. Originally released as Monolith in 2017 on Steam, the game was expanded for a release on the Nintendo Switch. The game was rebranded to avoid confusion with the video game studio Monolith.

== Views and style ==
According to himself, Gastrow sometimes writes a script for a video and records voice-overs during post-production, while other times recording along as he plays. Gastrow's videos depicting League of Legends and Overwatch (2016) are examples of the latter; he stated in an interview that he "would try to cut out the funniest parts." Gastrow's most viewed video, "Ultimate Skyrim", depicts him playing The Elder Scrolls V: Skyrim (2011) using a variety of user-created modifications to the point of breaking the game. Gastrow has cited people he knows, Adult Swim television series such as Aqua Teen Hunger Force, Space Ghost Coast to Coast, and the Tim & Eric shows as inspiration, and has said he enjoys watching videos by YouTubers ProJared and Gaming Historian.

According to Tone Madison's Reid Kurkerewicz, Gastrow is an example of "new games criticism", a reviewing approach inspired by New Journalism. Gastrow has been noted as a "fierce consumer advocate, deeply skeptical of corporate marketing machines." For instance, he has criticized Nintendo for demonetizing his review of Super Mario Odyssey (2017) on copyright grounds, and Microsoft for its business practices, including the cancellation of their Summer of Arcade deal. In his 2017 video "Game Critics", Gastrow denounced websites such as IGN for their decentralized opinions, poor writing, "the fuzzy ethics of building relationships with the companies [they're] meant to cover," and the divide between critics and audiences.

== Reputation ==
Gene Park of The Washington Post described Gastrow as one of the most influential critics on YouTube, noting he has inspired a number of imitators, and called him the Lester Bangs of video games. Like Bangs, Park wrote, Gastrow is an industry outsider, has created modern vernacular, and is an advocate for consumers. Patrick Klepek, writing for Vice, said Gastrow is one of the few YouTubers to whom he subscribes, calling him "a video editing maestro whose ability to make you laugh and understand why a game's interesting at the same time is unmatched. Even my wife, who barely plays games, loves Dunkey." Gastrow's ban from League of Legends for verbal abuse divided his followers; some defended him while others expressed surprise he considered insulting other players acceptable.

== Personal life ==
Gastrow was born on January 30, 1991. He has lived in Milwaukee and Madison, Wisconsin. Gastrow's mother is a second grade teacher. In September 2019, Gastrow married fellow YouTuber Leah Bee. In July 2023, Gastrow and Leah announced they were expecting their first child, a girl, who was born in October.

It is a common misconception and a running gag on the channel that Gastrow is black, which Leah attributes to his voice and the fact that he rarely shows his face in videos.

== See also ==
- List of YouTube personalities
