= No Case Should Remain Unsolved =

- Developer: Somi
- Publishers: Somi; Playism (Nintendo Switch)
- Composer: Seongyi Yi
- Platforms: Windows; Macintosh; Nintendo Switch; PlayStation 5
- Release: Windows, Macintosh: January 18, 2024; Nintendo Switch: September 19, 2024; PlayStation 5: August 19, 2026
- Genres: Adventure, puzzle
- Mode: Single-player

No Case Should Remain Unsolved (Note: Korean: 미제사건은 끝내야 하니까 lit. 'We Have to Put an End to These Unsolved Cases') is a mystery-themed video game. Developed by South Korean indie developer Somi. The story follows a retired Senior Inspector, Jean Gyeong, who is reexamining the disappearance of a young girl named Seowan. Gyeong can only relive her memories of interviewing suspects, such as Seowan's parents and a man who confesses to the kidnapping. The gameplay predominantly has players reading through various testimonies of people involved with the girl and re-arranging them in sequence and by character. To uncover new testimonies, the player selects words that stimulate memories within the existing testimonies.

Somi developed the game during their free time in 2023, as a change in their life gave them several months of free time. On its release, it won awards and awards at various game festivals. It received positive reviews from publications such as Edge, Famitsu, and IGN who complimented the game's story and tone as well as its unique gameplay.

== Gameplay ==
Gameplay in No Case Should Remain Unsolved consists predominantly of connecting blocks of text with then who said it and when it was spoken.

No Case Should Remain Unsolved has been described as an adventure game, a puzzle game and a visual novel. A reviewer from the The A.V. Club described it as operating in a "widening genre" they described as a reading comprehension game, where players simulate detective predominantly through the players' understanding of the narrative over various puzzles.

No Case Should Remain Unsolved consists of testimonies from people involved in the case. It is displayed through text boxes that occasionally have images included. The conversations are accompanied by monochrome illustrations. Each testimony is presented along a vertical axis indicating "when" it was spoken and a horizontal axis indicating who gave the testimony. To uncover new testimonies, the player selects words that stimulate memories within the existing testimonies. These range from common nouns such as "park," "kindergarten," or "lie," to people's names. As you select a word, new testimonies related to that word are discovered. The player is then required to examine the new testimonies, identify inconsistencies or discrepancies, and then rearrange them to reflect the correct speakers and their order.

Some testimonies contain information that can only be discovered by deduction. These include having a player needing to find statements that corroborate a lie in a testimony, or find a four-digit number related to a specific event.

== Synopsis ==
Former police detective Jeon Geyong is torn by regret over an old cold case of a child named Seowon who has gone missing and was never recovered; she relays this guilt to a person called "The Adjudicator" who insists that Jeon has in fact solved the case, but doesn't remember and must piece together what happened from her memories.

Going through her memories, Jeon remembers conversations with Seowon's parents, her brother, and various other people ― conversation fragments eventually begin contradicting each other, suggesting that Seowon's mother died years ago soon after Seowon was born, and that Seowon is in fact still alive. It is eventually revealed that the story tangles two families' lives together, both who had a child called Seowon, born a few months apart: Kim Seowon was born premature and died in about 3 months, while Choi Seowon is still alive; Kim Seowon's father never reported her death, and her mother Song Minyeong eventually developed a delusion that her daughter was still alive. When the elementary school Kim Seowon was due to start in notified her parents, her mother, now convinced that her daughter was alive, went around the local playgrounds to find her daughter, only to accidentally stumble into Choi Seowon, who happened to be left alone by her brother and her caretaker for a few minutes ― having heard her name called out loud, she was convinced she found her daughter, and took her home. Three days later, Kim Seowon's father, realizing what happened, returned Choi Seowon to her parents, claiming to be a kidnapper to take the fall to protect Song; when confronted by Jeon with the truth, he instead begged Jeon to marked the case unsolved.

Once Jeon remembers all the details of the case, The Adjudicator notes that everyone in the case was lying - including herself; the player is then given two options to finish the game:

- In the first option, The Adjudicator reveals herself to be a now-adult Choi Seowon, thanking Jeon for solving the case.
- In the second option, which is only available if the player has gained an additional "key" by ordering all conversations correctly, The Adjudicator reveals herself to be the real Jeon Geyong, talking to Song Minyeong; Song's delusion hasn't allowed her to let the case go, and when questioned, she's been imagining herself to be various personalities involved in the case, including Seowon or Jeon; the real Jeon resolves to get Song the help she needs.

== Development and release ==
Korean developer Somi, an indie developer from Busan, South Korea, has created video games since 2014. Like many of Somi's earlier games, it turns everyday tasks, such as operating a smartphone or reading someone's diary, into games. When asked about what influenced the game, Somi named novelists such as Kim Yeonsu and Keigo Higashino and that their favourite games were Lucas Pope's games, such as Papers Please (2013) and Return of the Obra Dinn (2018).

Somi developed the game during their free time in 2023, as a change in their life gave them several months of free time. It was made with the idea that it may be their last game as a developer. When developing the game, Somi was unsure if it was good or not. On sending it to translators, they all said the game moved them to tears, which he said led them to believe there would be a chance for the game.

No Case Should Remain Unsolved was first published by Somi and released through Steam on January 18, 2024. It was released by Playism for the Nintendo Switch on September 19, 2024, and the PlayStation 5 on August 19, 2026.

== Reception ==
Reception

Review scores
Publication	Score
Adventure Gamers	4/5
Edge	9/10
Famitsu	8/10, 9/10, 8/10, 8/10
IGN Italy	9/10
IGN Korea	9/10

In 2024, the game received several awards, including "Excellence in Game Design" from BitSummit Drift, "Excellence in Social Impact" and "Jury Prize") from the BIC Festival and "Most Amazing Game Award" from A MAZE.

Borgonovo complimented the game's investigation sequences as not being overtly guided. While one reviewer in Famitsu found the connecting of keywords to solve the mystery was refreshing, another reviewer in the magazine said that the ability to brute-force some solutions made it more enjoyable as a narrative experience than it was a gameplay one. Two critics in Famitsu, who reviewed the game on the Nintendo Switch commented on the controls, with one users saying the user interface was confusing and another saying as it appeared to be designed for a mouse, it was inconveneint to play the game with a controller.

Reviewers in both the Korean and Italian-language versions of IGN and the Japanese magazine Famitsu complimented theg games story. Alessandra Borgonovo of IGN Italy said while the game was not long, it was well-crafted and concluded that it was "depicts a very human tragedy" Other reviewers also complimented on the tone of the game with one Famitsu reviewer saying they wished regular society was as gentle as the game was. William Hughes of The A.V. Club said it was the "perfect antidote to recent explosions of excess." Reviewers from Edge and IGN commented on the game's ending, with the Edge reviewer writing "the sense of closure for player and protagonist feels as earned as it is overwhelming." Lottie Lynn of Eurogamer also complimented the endings, saying that they "successfully capture the bittersweet sensation that embracing the past often brings and I'll remember both for a long time." Kyunghyuk Lee of IGN Korea concluded that it delivered a series of emotions, which early literature tried to convey with short stories, more intensely and uniquely that could only be told through the medium of games.

Kagami Toshin and Hiroaki Mabuchi of IGN Japan included the game in each of their personal "Best Games of the Year" year-end lists. Toshin saying that along with Leap Year, 2024 left a lasting impressions with its small and brilliant indie games. The game won IGN Japan's "Innovative" award for 2024, beating The Legend of Zelda: Echoes of Wisdom (2024) and Astro Bot (2024).
