= Motion capture suit =

Garment that records the body movements of the wearer

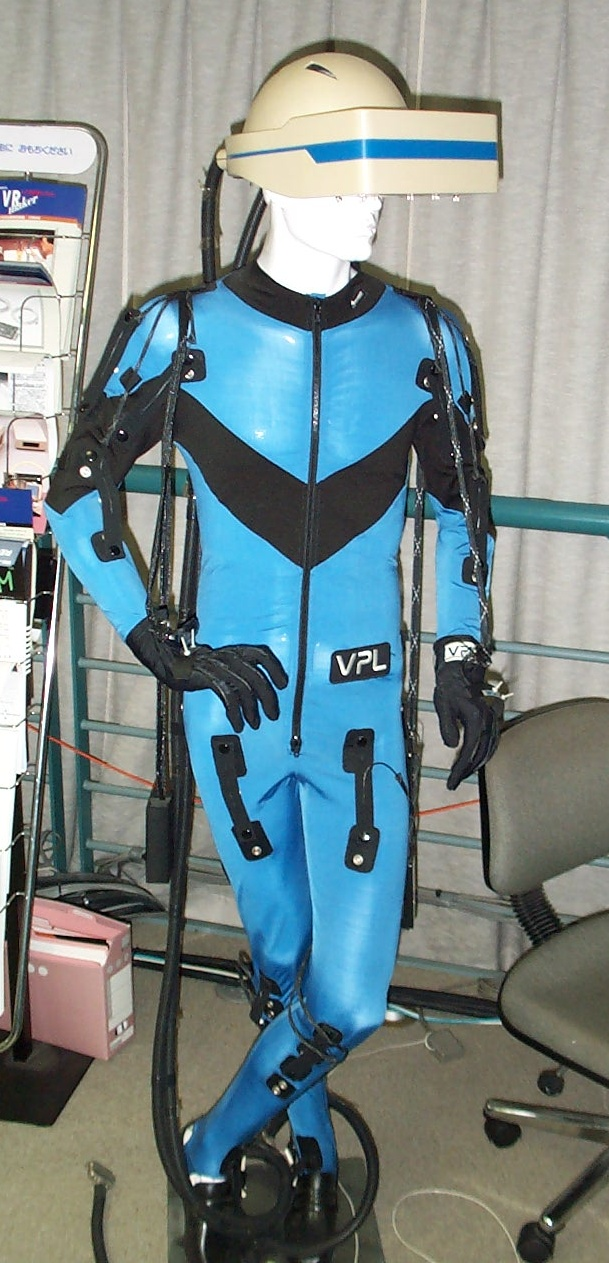
A VPL Research DataSuit, a full-body outfit with sensors for measuring the movement of arms, legs, and trunk. Developed circa 1989. Displayed at the Nissho Iwai showroom in Tokyo

A motion capture suit (or mo-cap suit) is a garment that aids in recording the body movements of the wearer. Some of these suits function as haptic suits, while others are made for affixing markers to the wearer via velcro material on the suit itself. The type of suit depends on what kind of data is being recorded, such as optical (via stage cameras tracking markers on a suit) or inertial (via sensors embedded within the suit itself) capture.

== History ==
Introduced in the late 1980s, the Data Suit by VPL Research was one of the earliest mo-cap suits in the market. Sensors stitched in the Data Suit were connected by fiber-optic cables to computers that updated the visuals 15 to 30 times a second. The Data Suit was ahead of its time, selling for up to $500,000 for a complete system (along with the EyePhone and the Data Glove).

== Current market ==
=== Tesla Suit ===
The Tesla Suit is a mo-cap suit that also uses neuromuscular electrical stimulation (NMES) to give the wearer sensations of touch, force and even warmth.

=== Husky Sense Suit ===
The Husky Sense suit is a mo-cap suit that uses 18 IMU sensors (gyroscope, accelerometer, magnetometer) to track, record and analyze body motions. It's relatively cheap and can be used in various use cases, such as sports, healthcare, defense, metaverse, gaming, VR training, animation creation, etc.

=== PrioVR ===
The PrioVR is mo-cap suit which is available in three versions: the Core which comes with 8 sensors for upper body tracking; the Lite with 12 sensors for full body tracking; and the Pro with 17 sensors which adds for precision with the feet, shoulders and hips.

=== Perception Neuron ===
Perception Neuron by the Chinese company Noitom uses 9-axis IMU to capture the movements of the wearer. It also comes with motion-capturing gloves. Perception Neuron can be used in AltspaceVR.

=== Smartsuit Pro ===
The Smartsuit Pro by Danish company Rokoko uses an array of 19 embedded 9-degrees of freedom (9-DoF) IMU sensors to capture motion data from the person wearing the suit. This data is used to live stream user movement via WiFi, or to input into software such as Unity, Unreal Engine 4, or MotionBuilder.

=== Xsens ===
At GDC 2016, Xsens announced integration with Unreal Engine 4 Later that month, Xsens collaborated with Dutch technology company Manus VR in order to showcase an immersive VR experience.

=== Holosuit ===
A bi-directional, full body motion controller with haptic feedback, Holosuit comes with a full body suit and can also be used separately as just gloves, jacket or pants.

=== G5 Mocapsuit ===
G5 Mocapsuit by AiQ Synertial is a 17-sensor IMU-based motion capture system with an option for 4-sensor 'Pincer Gloves'. Synertial partnered with 'AiQ Smart Clothing' of Taiwan, in 2018, to integrate fabric technology into its suits reducing significant amounts of sensor artefacts. GPS enabled. Sports Motion capture models use an Android app to manage onboard recording to calibrate 'later' as well as live streams data via WiFi & Bluetooth. Compatible with Unity (game engine), Unreal Engine 4, MotionBuilder, Tecnomatix and MocapBeats software plugins. G5 has various 'Cobra' and 'Exo-Glove' options as well as an HTC Vive plugin for root positioning inside a 6 x 6 meter capture space.

=== e-skin MEVA ===
e-skin MEVA by Japanese company Xenoma uses 6-axis IMUs in Pants/Shirt/Headband to capture the movements. e-skin MEVA is a third-generation e-textiles that is convenient to set up and easy to use even for physical disabilities. e-skin MEVA is mainly used for healthcare applications such as gait analysis and workload measurement of workers.

== See also ==
- Data glove
- Haptic suit
- Virtual reality headset
- Virtual reality
- Head-mounted display
