= 1000xResist =

2024 video game

- Developer: Sunset Visitor
- Publisher: Fellow Traveller Games
- Directors: Remy Siu; Kodai Yanagawa
- Producer: N. Tan
- Programmer: Colin J MacDougall
- Writers: Pinki Li; Conor Wylie
- Composers: Line Katcho; Drew Redman
- Engine: Unity
- Platforms: Nintendo Switch; Windows; PlayStation 5; Xbox Series X/S; Nintendo Switch 2
- Release: Nintendo Switch, Windows; 9 May 2024; PS5, Xbox Series X/S; 4 November 2025; Nintendo Switch 2; 20 August 2026
- Genre: Adventure
- Mode: Single-player

1000xResist (stylized as 1000xRESIST) is a 2024 adventure video game developed by Sunset Visitor and published by Fellow Traveller Games. The player takes the role of a clone named Watcher in the post-apocalyptic far future where aliens have eradicated most of humanity through a global pandemic, leaving only a small society of clones behind.

It was released on Nintendo Switch and Windows in May 2024. Versions for PlayStation 5 and Xbox Series X/S were released in November 2025. A version for Nintendo Switch 2 was released in August 2026. The game received generally positive reviews from critics, with praise directed to its narrative and treatment of themes relating to the experience of members of diaspora communities, the legacies of conflict, intergenerational trauma and the COVID-19 pandemic. Several critics described 1000xResist as one of the best games of 2024. Prior to release, the game received nominations for several awards at the 2024 Independent Games Festival, including a Peabody Award and shortlist for the Seumas McNally Grand Prize.

== Gameplay ==
Gameplay screenshot

1000xResist is a narrative-based adventure game involving environmental exploration and conversational choices with characters throughout the game's settings. The game features many optional conversations and interactions, particularly in the game's overarching area, the Orchard, which is navigated via a map of the area and a minimap to show waypoints of interest. In other parts of the game, players engage in Communion to explore memories, allowing them to jump forward or backwards in a given memory to explore previously inaccessible areas, or to see characters experience different time periods. Unlocking additional time periods can assist the player in completing puzzles or accessing new conversations to progress the story. In some segments during Communion, the player focuses on a specific memory by entering an abstract space, slowing time and interacting with floating spheres to fly between them to locate and listen to the characters who had the conversation.

== Plot ==
The backstory is presented nonlinearly throughout the game via memories and dialogue. Iris Kwan is a Canadian teenager whose parents fled the 2019–2020 Hong Kong protests and struggle to cope with the lingering trauma as an immigrant family. Sullen and indrawn, Iris lashes out at the people around her, including her parents and schoolmate Jiao, a recent Chinese immigrant who looks up to Iris. In 2047, an alien race called the Occupants arrives on Earth from a dying star system. They appear as giant red humanoids with halos in place of their heads, and spread a fatal virus that causes the body to expel blood and water through the eyes. While Iris's class, including Jiao, is wiped out by the disease, she proves to be immune and abandons her parents to be studied by a research group trying to preserve humanity. She brings a picture of Jiao through which she continues to talk to her.

Iris is taken aboard a generation ship, one of dozens designed to sink below the oceans to hide from the Occupants. Over the following years, communication is lost with the remaining other ships, while many clones are made of Iris but fail to preserve her immunity. Iris herself, who has stopped physically aging, grows increasingly resentful and eventually makes a deal with the Occupants, using their power to kill almost everyone on the ship in exchange for her memories transferred via a set of floating, geometric Occupant devices. She settles into a hospitable garden and atrium on the ship, known as the Orchard, and creates five new clones of herself as companions, sharing her memories in sessions called communions with both these sisters and the Occupants. The Youngest sister, seeking to please Iris, discovers relics of Jiao and attempts to clone her as a birthday present for Iris. Disgusted, Iris kills the Jiao clone, revokes the clones' immunity to the Occupant's disease, and condemns the sole surviving sister, Youngest, with the responsibility of creating all subsequent Iris-clones, before departing the Orchard forever.

A thousand years later, the Youngest has assumed control of the Orchard as Principal. The other Iris-clones are sorted by function, with one head sister of each type: Knower, Fixer, Healer, Bang Bang Fire, and Watcher. Principal leads worship of Iris, the Allmother, who will one day destroy the Occupants and reclaim the surface. She selects the worthiest clones to be sent to Iris by train, hoping to redeem the "ancient sin" committed by Youngest. At the start of the game, the player assumes the role of Watcher, who uses one of the Occupant devices, called Secretary, to engage in communion and explore Iris's memories. While communing with Principal, Watcher is confronted by Fixer, a close friend who had left on the train, about the Allmother's true nature. As communication from the "other side" is forbidden, Watcher reports this to Principal and is told that Fixer has been incinerated.

After communions with Bang Bang Fire and Healer, an Occupant incursion puts the Orchard on lockdown and leaves many sisters dead. While sheltering, Watcher communes with Knower, and discovers the Occupant's fascination with memories and their collaboration with Iris. Outraged from learning of Iris' betrayal and that Secretary is of Occupant origin, Watcher smashes Secretary and uses one of its broken shards to assassinate Iris. Principal arrives in time to arrest Watcher for Iris' murder before revealing herself to be Youngest, having deceived Watcher by tampering with her communions. In the aftermath, mourning and violence break out among the sisters before Principal establishes an autocratic, Provisional Government with Knower as High Minister. Knower, while sympathetic to Watcher, imprisons and tortures her for three years as she refuses to cooperate with the regime. Watcher is later rescued by an alive Fixer in a breakout devised by Knower. During this time factions emerge in the community, including a religious cult awaiting the second coming of the Allmother, a servant caste of newly-created Jiao clones, a harsh police force of Red Guards, and unclassified "Miscellaneous" Iris-clones that reside in Old Town, a scale-model Asian town-district located under the Orchard.

Seven years after Iris' death, the player now controls Blue, a Miscellaneous clone who works in a bar in Old Town. After her employer and friend Bartender is killed for her seditious actions, Blue makes contact with anti-government groups to assemble a bomb that kills most of the ministers and wounds Principal during a scheduled theatre performance. In the ensuing chaos, Blue escapes to the underground trains before being rescued by Fixer, Healer, Bang Bang Fire, and a blinded and critically injured Watcher, with whom she communes to discover a way to remove Principal from power. After Watcher succumbs to her injuries and dies following a final communion, the remaining members of the resistance devise a plan to merge Secretary with a summoned Occupant and trigger a mass communion to expose Principal's deception. With the help of Knower redirecting Red Guards and rebel forces launching diversionary attacks, Secretary successfully makes contact with the last remaining Occupant on Earth. Realizing the Occupant's cold apathy to Iris, humanity, and the nature of death, Secretary overpowers the Occupant's consciousness and erases their recorded memories of Iris. The newly merged Occupant then lets Blue decide which of the factions and surviving sisters will be carried forward into the new world, leading to one of several endings. In an epilogue set many years later, an unnamed Jiao clone explores an abandoned Orchard and discovers various characters' epitaphs.

== Development and release ==
1000xResist was created by Sunset Visitor, a four-person development team based in Vancouver, Canada, with backgrounds in theatre, new media, dance and performance art. Creative director Remy Siu stated the game began as a prototype in March 2020 following the onset of the coronavirus pandemic, during a period when the developers were unable to perform or tour and decided to enter video game development. The characters in the game were animated using Rokoko motion capture technology.

1000xResist was announced with the release of a trailer in September 2022, and a demo was showcased at Steam Next Fest in February 2023. The full version of the game was published by Fellow Traveller on 9 May 2024 on PC and the Nintendo Switch. The game was distributed as part of a Summer Narrative Celebration Humble Bundle in September 2024. Ports to PlayStation 5 and Xbox Series X/S were released on 4 November 2025.

== Reception ==
Reception

Aggregate scores
Aggregator	Score
Metacritic	(PC) 86/100 (NS) 87/100
OpenCritic	100% recommend

Review scores
Publication	Score
Destructoid	8.5/10
Edge	8/10
Eurogamer	4/5
Game Informer	9.5/10
IGN	9/10
Nintendo World Report	9/10
TouchArcade	5/5
Financial Times	5/5
Paste	9.7
Siliconera	90%
Softpedia	4/5

According to review aggregator website Metacritic, 1000xResist received "generally favorable" reviews from critics, with the site identifying the game as one of the highest-rated of the first half of 2024. Fellow review aggregator OpenCritic assessed that the game received "mighty" approval, being recommended by 100% of critics. Several critics described 1000xResist as one of the best games of 2024.

Many critics praised the game's themes, with reviewers noting its content explored the impact of the coronavirus pandemic, the experiences of members of diaspora communities, and of conflict and intergenerational trauma. Tom Faber of the Financial Times stated the game explores "existential themes and contemporary global politics with a sophistication and maturity that are still lamentably rare in gaming". Josh Torres of RPG Site lauded the game for its "illustration of the different struggles of immigration across generations", highlighting its treatment of themes around intergenerational trauma, conflict and the "intricacies of Asian diaspora". Considering the game to defy summarisation or simple metaphor, Alexis Ong of Eurogamer similarly discussed the game's treatment of the "invisible", "ugly and gruelling" effects of immigration and eventual assimilation.

The writing of 1000xResist was similarly praised, with several critics praising the story as one of the best narratives in a game. Faber considered the game to be a "feat of storytelling" and commended the game's "uniformly superb" writing as "poetic, poignant and humorous". Ed Smith of PCGamesN highlighted the developers' "command of dialogue, characterization, staging, symbolism and visual metaphor". Finding 1000xResist to be "purposed" in its writing, Michael Higham of IGN focused on the game's characterisation, praising characters as fully-formed, rich in personality and expressing genuine warmth in their interactions.

The visual presentation received generally positive comments. Oisin Kuhnke of VG247 described the game as "visually stunning" and "the most boldly art directed game of the year". Higham did not consider the game as graphically impressive, but expressed that the game let "its creative techniques speak as loud as its words" through the use of "striking" colors and camera angles. Faber found the game's graphics to "underwhelm" but be compensated by a "strong" and "stylish" artistic direction.

As of February 2025, 70,000 copies had been sold, with an unusual surge in sales in January 2025, seven months after the initial launch. 100,000 copies had been sold by early May 2025, i.e. in the first year of release.

=== Accolades ===
Year	Ceremony	Category	Result	Ref.
2024	Independent Games Festival	Seumas McNally Grand Prize	Nominated	
2024	Independent Games Festival	Excellence in Narrative	Nominated	
2024	Independent Games Festival	Nuovo Award	Nominated	
2024	Golden Joystick Awards	Best Storytelling	Nominated	
2025	New York Game Awards	Big Apple Award for Best Game of the Year	Nominated	
2025	New York Game Awards	Off Broadway Award for Best Indie Game	Nominated	
2025	New York Game Awards	Herman Melville Award for Best Writing in a Game	Nominated	
2025	New York Game Awards	Tin Pan Alley Award for Best Music in a Game	Nominated	
2025	28th Annual D.I.C.E. Awards	Adventure Game of the Year	Nominated	
2025	28th Annual D.I.C.E. Awards	Outstanding Achievement in Game Direction	Nominated	
2025	28th Annual D.I.C.E. Awards	Outstanding Achievement in Character (Watcher)	Nominated	
2025	28th Annual D.I.C.E. Awards	Outstanding Achievement in Story	Nominated	
2025	25th Game Developers Choice Awards	Best Debut	Nominated	
2025	25th Game Developers Choice Awards	Best Narrative	Nominated	
2025	25th Game Developers Choice Awards	Social Impact	Nominated	
2025	Game Audio Network Guild Awards	Best Dialogue for an Indie Game	Nominated	
2025	Game Audio Network Guild Awards	Best New Original IP Audio	Nominated	
2025	Nebula Awards	Best Game Writing	Nominated	
2025	Hugo Awards	Best Game or Interactive Work	Nominated	
2025	Peabody Awards	Peabody Award for Interactive & Immersive Work	Won	
