= Don James (executive) =

American video game executive

Don James is an American video game executive, and served as the Executive Vice President of Operations for Nintendo of America from August 10, 1981 until his retirement on August 10, 2024.

As a key member of the team led by Howard Lincoln and Minoru Arakawa, James played a critical role in the reintroduction of home video game consoles in North America after the video game crash of 1983, when the Nintendo Entertainment System spawned a late-1980s rebirth of video games. After the collapse of the home video game industry in 1983–84, retailers and press widely agreed that "video game consoles are dead, and the computer game industry is a niche market which mass market retailers should ignore". Arakawa, Lincoln and James coordinated the introduction of the NES while struggling to overcome that skepticism, and ultimately paved the way for Nintendo (and, to a lesser extent, Sega and Atari) to rebuild the multibillion-dollar industry during the last half of the decade.

James joined Nintendo of America in August 1981, and his employment with the company has now spanned over 40 years. He has been responsible for manufacturing, product development, and design for both coin-op and home games such as Tin Star.

James participated in organizing and creating the Interactive Digital Software Association (later renamed the Entertainment Software Association) and was a leader in the creation of the Electronic Entertainment Expo trade show for the video game industry, the largest event of its kind in the world. He still sits on the advisory committee of the ESA.

He also helped to create the Entertainment Software Rating Board rating system and currently sits on the Advisory Committee for the ESRB. The ratings system was designed in response to concerns from the United States Congress about violence and other content in video games that was inappropriate for younger players. James has been a key figure in Nintendo's conservative approach to such mature game content.

James has been a member of the board of directors of the Academy of Interactive Arts & Sciences (AIAS) since the inception of the organization. On February 13, 2025, James received the Lifetime Achievement Award from the AIAS during the 28th Annual D.I.C.E. Awards.
