= 28th Annual D.I.C.E. Awards =

2025 video-game awards event

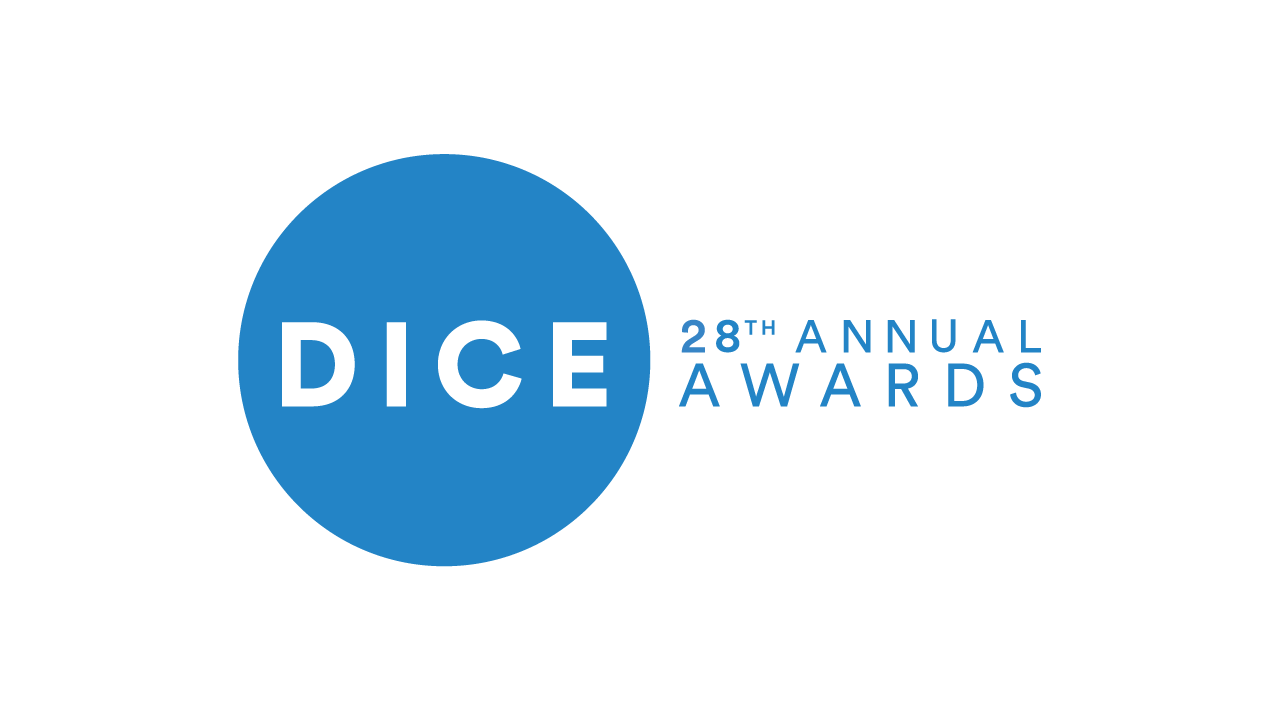
- Date: February 13, 2025
- Venue: Aria Resort & Casino
- Hosted by: Stella Chung, Greg Miller

Highlights
- Most awards: Astro Bot (5)
- Most nominations: Astro Bot; Helldivers 2; Indiana Jones and the Great Circle (6)
- Game of the Year: Astro Bot
- Hall of Fame: Ted Price
- Lifetime Achievement: Don James

The 28th Annual D.I.C.E. Awards was the 28th edition of the D.I.C.E. Awards ("Design Innovate Communicate Entertain"), an annual awards event that honored the best games in the video game industry during 2024. The awards ceremony was arranged by the Academy of Interactive Arts & Sciences (AIAS), and was a part of the 2025 D.I.C.E. Summit. The ceremony took place on February 13, 2025, at the Aria Resort & Casino in Las Vegas, Nevada. Greg Miller of Kinda Funny Games and Stella Chung, formerly of IGN, returned as hosts for the ceremony. The nominees were announced on January 10, 2025.

The three most nominated games, each with six nominations, were Astro Bot, Helldivers 2, and Indiana Jones and the Great Circle. Other heavily nominated games included Balatro and Senua's Saga: Hellblade II with five nominations, as well as 1000xResist, Animal Well, and Batman: Arkham Shadow each having four nominations. Astro Bot won the most awards with five, including Game of the Year. Other multiple award-winning games were Helldivers 2 with four awards, and Balatro and Indiana Jones and the Great Circle both with three awards. Sony Interactive Entertainment was the top publisher, publishing five games with fifteen nominations, and winning ten awards amongst three games.

Ted Price, President and Founder of Insomniac Games, who helped oversee the creation of popular games such as Spyro the Dragon, Ratchet & Clank, Resistance: Fall of Man and Marvel's Spider-Man series, was inducted into the AIAS Hall of Fame. Don James, former Executive Vice-President of Nintendo of America, received the Academy's Lifetime Achievement Award. Don James heavily contributed to the creation of the ESRB and Interactive Digital Software Association, now known as the Entertainment Software Association, and its signature trade show, E3.

== Winners and nominees ==
Winners are listed first, highlighted in boldface, and indicated with a double dagger (‡).

=== Game of the Year awards ===
**Game of the Year**: **Astro Bot (Team Asobi, Sony Interactive Entertainment) — Nicolas Doucet, Hironori Yatoku, Masayuki Yamada**‡; Balatro (LocalThunk, PlayStack); Black Myth: Wukong (Game Science) — Feng Ji; Helldivers 2 (Arrowhead Game Studios, Sony Interactive Entertainment) — Johan Pilestedt; Indiana Jones and the Great Circle (MachineGames, Bethesda Softworks) — Jerk Gustafsson, Axel Torvenius, John Jennings, Todd Howard	**Online Game of the Year**: **Helldivers 2 (Arrowhead Game Studios, Sony Interactive Entertainment) — Johan Pilestedt**‡; Call of Duty: Black Ops 6 (Treyarch, Activision) — Matt Scronce, Kevin Drew; Diablo IV: Vessel of Hatred (Blizzard Entertainment) — Brent Gibson, Rod Fergusson, Gavian Wishaw; Marvel Rivals (NetEase) — Weicong Wu, Guangyun Chen, Fan Feng, Dino Ma; Warhammer 40,000: Space Marine 2 (Saber Interactive, Focus Entertainment) — Dmitry Grigorenko, Oliver Hollis-Leick, Alexey Tkachev
**Mobile Game of the Year**: **Balatro (LocalThunk, PlayStack)**‡; Halls of Torment (Chasing Carrots) — Dominik Schneider, Paul Lawitzki, Mara Mehlitz; Monument Valley 3 (ustwo, Netflix Games) — Jennifer Estaris, Emily Brown, John Lau; Paper Trail (Newfangled Games) — Henry Hoffman, Robert Maloney; Wuthering Waves (Kuro Games) — Solon Li	**Outstanding Achievement for an Independent Game**: **Balatro (LocalThunk, PlayStack)**‡; Animal Well (Shared Memory, Bigmode) — Billy Basso; Grunn (Sokpop Collective) — Tom van den Boogaart; Indika (Odd-Meter, 11 Bit Studios) — Dmitry Svetlow, Maxim Lebedev, Maxim Skobelev, Alex Posedko; Mouthwashing (Wrong Organ, Critical Reflex) — Johanna Kasurinen, Yasmine Lindberger, Martin Halldin, Dave van Egdom, Jeffrey Tomec, Tanakorn Ratanal-orng, Kai Moore

=== Immersive Reality awards ===
**Immersive Reality Game of the Year**: **Batman: Arkham Shadow (Camouflaj, Oculus Studios) — Ryan Payton, Aaron Whiting**‡; Alien: Rogue Incursion (Survios, 20th Century Games) — Margheritta Seconinno, TQ Jefferson, Eugene Elkin; Escaping Wonderland (Cortopia Studios, Beyond Frames Entertainment) — Michael Nordström, Pelle Hallert; Skydance's Behemoth (Skydance Games) — Brian Murphy, Shawn Kittelsen, Jesse Young; Underdogs (One Hamsa) — Dave Levy, Assaf Ronen	**Immersive Reality Technical Achievement**: **Starship Home (Creature) — Mark Schramm, Ashley Pinnick, Doug North Cook**‡; Alien: Rogue Incursion (Survios, 20th Century Games) — Patrick Harris, Shelby Tang; Batman: Arkham Shadow (Camouflaj, Oculus Studios) — Ryan Darcey, Colin Doody, Troy Johnsen; Skydance's Behemoth (Skydance Games) — Peter Akemann, Jason Bare, Simon Inch; Underdogs (One Hamsa) — Dave Levy, Niv Fisher

=== Craft awards ===
**Outstanding Achievement in Game Direction**: **Animal Well (Shared Memory, Bigmode) — Billy Basso**‡; 1000xResist (Sunset Visitor, Fellow Traveller Games) — Remy Siu, Colin MacDougall, Kodai Yanagawa; Lorelei and the Laser Eyes (Simogo, Annapurna Interactive) — Simon Flesser, Magnus Gordon Gardebäck; Riven (Cyan Worlds) — Rand Miller, Richard Vander Wende, Eric A. Anderson, Hannah Gamiel; Thank Goodness You're Here! (Coal Supper, Panic Inc.) — James Carbutt, Will Todd	**Outstanding Achievement in Game Design**: **Astro Bot (Team Asobi, Sony Interactive Entertainment) — Nicolas Doucet, Hironori Yatoku, Gento Morita**‡; Animal Well (Shared Memory, Bigmode) — Billy Basso; Balatro (LocalThunk, PlayStack); Helldivers 2 (Arrowhead Game Studios, Sony Interactive Entertainment) — Niklas Malmborg, Mikael Eriksson; UFO 50 (Mossmouth) — Derek Yu, Jon Perry, Eirik Suhrke, Paul Hubans, Tyriq Plummer, Ojiro Fumoto
**Outstanding Achievement in Animation**: **Astro Bot (Team Asobi, Sony Interactive Entertainment) — Nicolas Doucet, Jamie Smith, Kohei Kawa**‡; Call of Duty: Black Ops 6 (Treyarch, Activision) — Phil Lozano, Martin McBain; Final Fantasy VII Rebirth (Square Enix) — Yoshiyuki Soma; Neva (Nomada Studio, Devolver Digital) — Adrián Miguel, Ian García, Arnau Martín; Warhammer 40,000: Space Marine 2 (Saber Interactive, Focus Entertainment) — Aleksandr Rudenko	**Outstanding Achievement in Art Direction**: **Black Myth: Wukong (Game Science) — Yang Qi**‡; Indiana Jones and the Great Circle (MachineGames, Bethesda Softworks) — Axel Torvenius, Mattias Astenvald; Lego Horizon Adventures (Guerrilla Games, Studio Gobo, Sony Interactive Entertainment) — Paul Ayliffe, Jan-Bart van Beek, Roy Postma; The Plucky Squire (All Possible Futures, Devolver Digital) — Jamie Turner; Senua's Saga: Hellblade II (Ninja Theory, Xbox Game Studios) — Mark Slater-Tunstill, Dan Crossland, Dan Attwell
**Outstanding Achievement in Character**: **Dr. Henry "Indiana" Jones, Indiana Jones and the Great Circle (MachineGames, Bethesda Softworks) — Portrayed by Troy Baker; writer Tommy Tordsson Björk; game director Jerk Gustafsson; executive producer Todd Howard**‡; Watcher, 1000xResist (Sunset Visitor, Fellow Traveller Games) — Portrayed by Nhi Do; writer Natalie Tin Yin Gan; VO director Remy Siu; Yuffie Kisaragi, Final Fantasy VII Rebirth (Square Enix) — Portrayed by Suzie Yeung; creative director Tetsuya Nomura; story & scenario by Kazushige Nojima; Indika, Indika (Odd-Meter, 11 Bit Studios) — Portrayed by Anastassia Dyachuk; director Dmitry Svetlow; script by Dmitry Svetlow & Maxim Lebedev; Senua, Senua's Saga: Hellblade II (Ninja Theory, Xbox Game Studios) — Portrayed by Melina Juergens; writer Lara Derham	**Outstanding Achievement in Original Music Composition**: **Helldivers 2 (Arrowhead Game Studios, Sony Interactive Entertainment) — Wilbert Roget II, Ross Tregenza, Keith Leary**‡; Astro Bot (Team Asobi, Sony Interactive Entertainment) — Kenneth C.M. Young; Monument Valley 3 (ustwo, Netflix Games) — Todd Baker, Lucie Treacher; Senua's Saga: Hellblade II (Ninja Theory, Xbox Game Studios) — David Garcia-Diaz; Star Wars Outlaws (Massive Entertainment, Ubisoft) — Wilbert Roget II, Cody Matthew Johnson, Simon Koudriavtsev
**Outstanding Achievement in Audio Design**: **Helldivers 2 (Arrowhead Game Studios, Sony Interactive Entertainment) — Harvey Scott, Bianca Salinas, Alex Bolle**‡; Frostpunk 2 (11 Bit Studios) — Krzysztof Lipka; Monument Valley 3 (ustwo, Netflix Games) — Todd Baker, Lucie Treacher; Senua's Saga: Hellblade II (Ninja Theory, Xbox Game Studios) — David Garcia-Diaz; Still Wakes the Deep (The Chinese Room, Secret Mode) — Daan Hendriks	**Outstanding Achievement in Story**: **Indiana Jones and the Great Circle (MachineGames, Bethesda Softworks) — Tommy Tordsson Björk, Jerk Gustafsson, Todd Howard**‡; 1000xResist (Sunset Visitor, Fellow Traveller Games) — Natalie Tin Yin Gan, Conor Wylie, Remy Siu; Metaphor: ReFantazio (Studio Zero, Atlus) — Katsura Hashino, Yuichiro Tanaka; Still Wakes the Deep (The Chinese Room, Secret Mode) — Dan Pinchbeck, Emma Beeby; Thank Goodness You're Here! (Coal Supper, Panic Inc.) — James Carbutt, Will Todd
**Outstanding Technical Achievement**: **Astro Bot (Team Asobi, Sony Interactive Entertainment) — Nicolas Doucet, Masayuki Yamada, Takumi Yoshida**‡; Batman: Arkham Shadow (Camouflaj, Oculus Studios) — Ryan Darcey, Colin Doody, Troy Johnsen; Indiana Jones and the Great Circle (MachineGames, Bethesda Softworks) — Jim Kjellin; Senua's Saga: Hellblade II (Ninja Theory, Xbox Game Studios) — Gavin Costello, Loong Wei Ding; Warhammer 40,000: Space Marine 2 (Saber Interactive, Focus Entertainment) — Anatolii Koruka, Aleksey Melnikov, Nikolay Salin

=== Genre awards ===
**Action Game of the Year**: **Helldivers 2 (Arrowhead Game Studios, Sony Interactive Entertainment) — Johan Pilestedt**‡; Batman: Arkham Shadow (Camouflaj, Oculus Studios) — Ryan Payton, Aaron Whiting; Black Myth: Wukong (Game Science) — Feng Ji; Call of Duty: Black Ops 6 (Treyarch, Activision) — Matt Scronce, Kevin Drew, John Zuk; Stellar Blade (Shift Up, Sony Interactive Entertainment) — HyungTae Kim, DongKi Lee, Junho Lee	**Adventure Game of the Year**: **Indiana Jones and the Great Circle (MachineGames, Bethesda Softworks) — Jerk Gustafsson, Axel Torvenius, John Jennings, Todd Howard**‡; 1000xResist (Sunset Visitor, Fellow Traveller Games) — Remy Siu, Colin MacDougall, Kodai Yanagawa; Animal Well (Shared Memory, Bigmode) — Billy Basso; The Legend of Zelda: Echoes of Wisdom (Grezzo, Nintendo EPD) — Eiji Aonuma, Satoshi Terada, Tomomi Sano; Prince of Persia: The Lost Crown (Ubisoft Montpellier) — Mounir Radi, Jean-Christophe Alessandri, Abdelhak Elguess
**Family Game of the Year**: **Astro Bot (Team Asobi, Sony Interactive Entertainment) — Nicolas Doucet, Hironori Yatoku, Masayuki Yamada**‡; Cat Quest III (The Gentlebros, Kepler Interactive) — Desmond Wong; Little Kitty, Big City (Double Dagger) — Matt T. Wood; The Plucky Squire (All Possible Futures, Devolver Digital) — Jonathan Biddle, Jamie Turner, Kitty Crawford; Super Mario Party Jamboree (Nintendo Cube) — Takeru Sugimoto, Shuichiro Nishiya, Toshiaki Suzuki	**Fighting Game of the Year**: **Tekken 8 (Bandai Namco Entertainment) — Katsuhiro Harada, Kohei Ikeda (Nakatsu), Yohei Shimbori, Yasuki Nakabayashi**‡; Blazing Strike (RareBreed Makes Games, Aksys Games) — Mark Chung; Dragon Ball: Sparking! Zero (Spike Chunsoft, Bandai Namco Entertainment) — Akira Toriyama, Tairi Kikuchi, Hiroyuki Kaneko; Mortal Kombat 1: Khaos Reigns (NetherRealm Studios, Warner Bros. Games) — Ed Boon, Graeme Bayless; Underdogs (One Hamsa) — Dave Levy, Assaf Ronen
**Racing Game of the Year**: **F1 24 (Codemasters, Electronic Arts) — Lee Mather**‡; MotoGP 24 (Milestone) — Matteo Pezzotti, Stefano Talarico; Night-Runners Prologue (Planet Jem) — Jem Byrne	**Role-Playing Game of the Year**: **Metaphor: ReFantazio (Studio Zero, Atlus) — Katsura Hashino, Junichi Yoshizawa**‡; Dragon Age: The Veilguard (BioWare, Electronic Arts) — John Epler, Corinne Busche, Gary McKay; Elden Ring Shadow of the Erdtree (FromSoftware, Bandai Namco Entertainment) — Hidetaka Miyazaki, Yui Tanimura, Eiichi Nakajima; Final Fantasy VII Rebirth (Square Enix) — Naoki Hamaguchi, Tetsuya Nomura, Yoshinori Kitase; Like a Dragon: Infinite Wealth (Ryu Ga Gotoku Studio, Sega) — Ryosuke Horii, Hiroyuki Sakamoto, Masayoshi Yokoyama
**Sports Game of the Year**: **MLB The Show 24 (SIE San Diego Studio, MLB Advanced Media) — Chris Cutliff, Ramone Russell, Steve Merka**‡; EA Sports College Football 25 (EA Tiburon, EA Sports) — Christian McLeod, Scott O'Gallagher, Rob Jones; EA Sports FC 25 (EA Vancouver, EA Romania, EA Sports) — John Shepherd, Adam Shaikh, Karim Versi; NBA 2K25 (Visual Concepts, 2K Games) — Greg Thomas, Erick Boenisch, Mike Wang	**Strategy/Simulation Game of the Year**: **Balatro (LocalThunk, PlayStack)**‡; Caves of Qud (Freehold Games, Kitfox Games) — Brian Bucklew, Jason Grinblat, Craig Hamilton, Corey Frang, Bastia Rosen, Autumn McDonell, Samuel Wilson, Caelyn Sandelc; Frostpunk 2 (11 Bit Studios) — Jakub Stokalski, Łukasz Juszczyk, Szymon Jabłoński; Satisfactory (Coffee Stain Studios) — Mark Hofma, Oscar Jilsén; Tactical Breach Wizards (Suspicious Developments) — Tom Francis, John Roberts, John Winder

=== Special awards ===
Hall of Fame

- Ted Price

Lifetime Achievement

- Don James

=== Multiple nominations and awards ===
==== Multiple nominations ====
Games that received multiple nominations
Nominations	Game
6	Astro Bot
6	Helldivers 2
6	Indiana Jones and the Great Circle
5	Balatro
5	Senua's Saga: Hellblade II
4	1000xResist
4	Animal Well
4	Batman: Arkham Shadow
3	Black Myth: Wukong
3	Call of Duty: Black Ops 6
3	Final Fantasy VII Rebirth
3	Monument Valley 3
3	Underdogs
3	Warhammer 40,000: Space Marine 2
2	Alien: Rogue Incursion
2	Frostpunk 2
2	Indika
2	Metaphor: ReFantazio
2	The Plucky Squire
2	Skydance's Behemoth
2	Still Wakes the Deep
2	Thank Goodness You're Here!

Nominations by company
Nominations	Games	Company
15	5	Sony Interactive Entertainment
6	1	Arrowhead Game Studios
6	1	Bethesda Softworks
6	1	MachineGames
6	1	Team Asobi
5	1	LocalThunk
5	1	Ninja Theory
5	1	Playstack
5	1	Xbox Game Studios
4	4	Electronic Arts
4	2	11 Bit Studios
4	1	Bigmode
4	1	Camouflaj
4	1	Fellow Traveller Games
4	1	Oculus Studios
4	1	Shared Memory
4	1	Sunset Visitor
3	3	Bandai Namco Entertainment
3	2	Devolver Digital
3	1	Activision
3	1	Focus Entertainment
3	1	Game Science
3	1	Netflix Games
3	1	One Hamsa
3	1	Saber Interactive
3	1	Square Enix
3	1	Treyarch
3	1	ustwo
2	2	Nintendo
2	2	Ubisoft
2	1	20th Century Games
2	1	All Possible Futures
2	1	Atlus
2	1	The Chinese Room
2	1	Coal Supper
2	1	Odd-Meter
2	1	Panic Inc.
2	1	Skydance Games
2	1	Secret Mode
2	1	Survios

==== Multiple awards ====
Games that received multiple awards
Awards	Game
5	Astro Bot
4	Helldivers 2
3	Balatro
3	Indiana Jones and the Great Circle

Awards by company
Awards	Games	Company
10	3	Sony Interactive Entertainment
5	1	Team Asobi
4	1	Arrowhead Game Studios
3	1	Bethesda Softworks
3	1	LocalThunk
3	1	MachineGames
3	1	PlayStack
