= Metroidvania =

Video game sub-genre

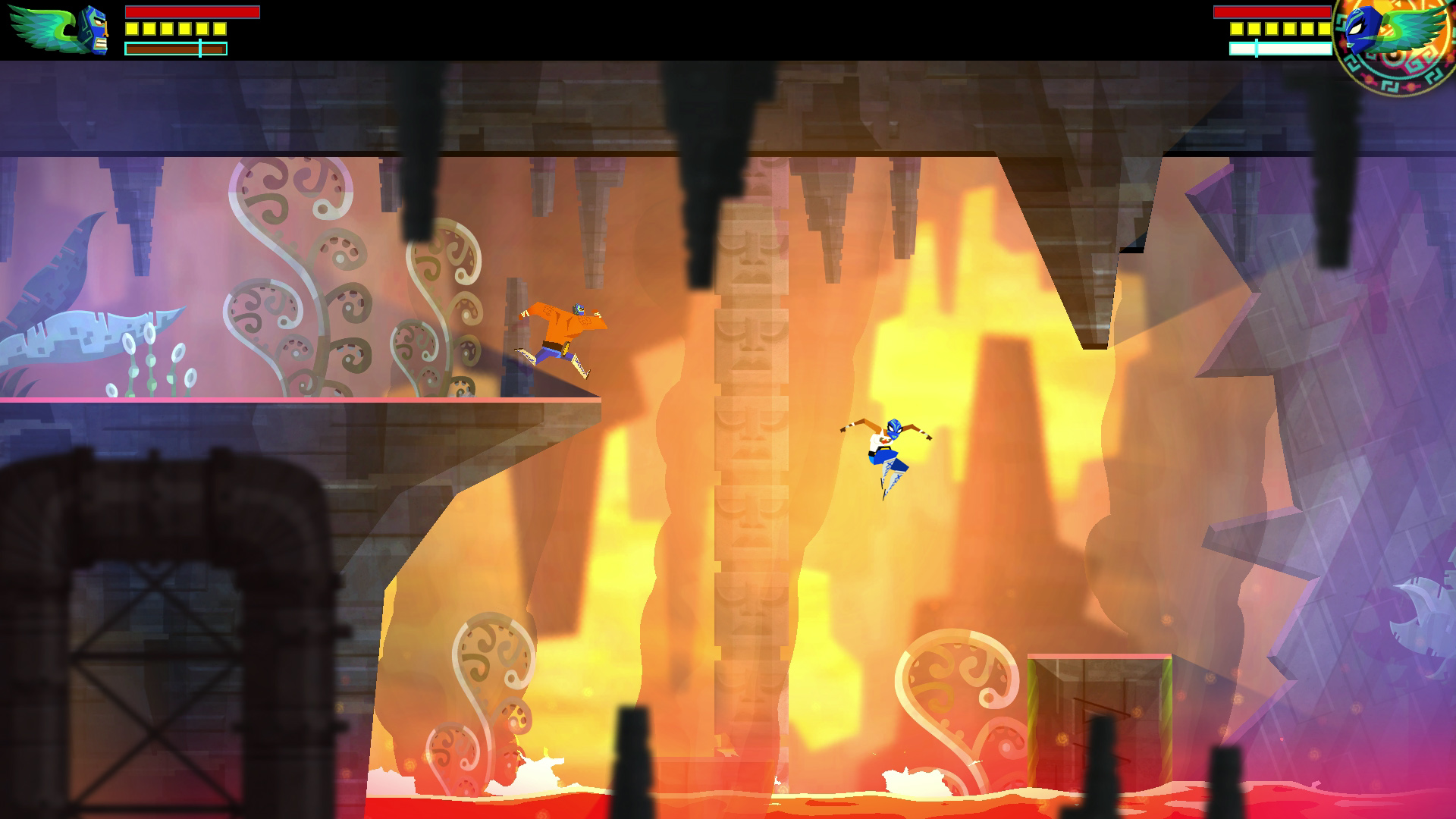
Screenshot of the 2013 Metroidvania game Guacamelee!

A Metroidvania is a sub-genre of action-adventure games focused on nonlinear exploration and guided progression with a need to acquire key items to enter certain areas. The term is a portmanteau of the names of the video game series Metroid and Castlevania, based on the template from Metroid (1986), Castlevania II: Simon's Quest (1987), Super Metroid (1994), and Castlevania: Symphony of the Night (1997), among others in their respective series.

These games usually feature a large interconnected world map the player can explore, although parts of the world will be inaccessible to the player until they acquire special items, tools, weapons, abilities, or knowledge within the game. Acquiring such improvements can also aid the player in defeating more difficult enemies and locating shortcuts and secret areas, and often includes retracing one's steps across the map. Through this, Metroidvania games include tighter integration of story and level design, careful design of levels and character controls to encourage exploration and experimentation, and a means for the player to become more invested in their player character through role-playing game elements. While early examples were usually two-dimensional side-scrolling platform games, the term has since been applied to top-down and 3D games.

The first Metroid game in 1986 established principles of the non-linear platformer that were refined through multiple iterations, with Super Metroid in 1994 considered to have polished the style of gameplay core to Metroidvanias. Castlevania: Symphony of the Night in 1997 is considered the defining Metroidvania game, incorporating role-playing elements from the Legend of Zelda series with non-linear traversal within the Castlevania series; most subsequent Castlevania games followed its approach and refined the genre. Symphony of the Night's assistant director, Koji Igarashi, is credited with establishing key principles of Metroidvanias through his work on other Castlevania games. In the 2010s, a resurgence in Metroidvanias came about due to several critically praised independently developed games such as Ori and the Blind Forest (2015), Hollow Knight (2017) and Blasphemous (2019).

== Terminology ==
"Metroidvania" is a portmanteau of the two video game series that such games often borrow from, Metroid and Castlevania. While the word "Metroidvania" is commonly used to describe games in this genre, or games that have elements of this genre, the origins of the term are unclear; Koji Igarashi, who is credited with establishing fundamental elements of this genre with Castlevania: Symphony of the Night, notes that he did not coin the phrase, but is grateful for the invention of the term. Igarashi noted that with Symphony of the Night the goal was to have exploration closer to the top-down The Legend of Zelda approach, but with the side-scrolling nature, it was compared more to Metroid, and believes this is how the portmanteau came about. Video game journalist Jeremy Parish, who manages the Metroidvania.com site that has attempted to catalog all known Metroidvania games, acknowledges he helped to popularize the term but had learned it from his former co-worker at 1UP.com, Scott Sharkey, who had used the term to describe the games in the Castlevania series that had adopted some elements from the Metroid series.

There is some opposition to the use of the term Metroidvania, as it is derived from specific games rather than being a more direct description of gameplay. Comic Book Resources compared the use of Metroidvania to "Doom clone" in the 1990s, a term which was eventually replaced by "first-person shooter" as the medium developed. Game Developer has also suggested that the term is too broad, as it encompasses a wide range of 2D and 3D games, and instead proposed "unlocking world", in a vein similar to "open world". CBR has also proposed "platform-adventure". An equivalent Japanese term is tansaku-gata akushon (探索型アクション; lit. 'exploratory/search action'), which is used alongside the transcribed メトロイドヴァニア (metoroidovania). Japanese gaming publication Famitsu wrote in 2020 that the term for the exploration-based action game genre "Metroidvania" had only recently become a commonly used term in Japan.

== History ==
While not the first game of its kind (for example, Below the Root was released in 1984, or Brain Breaker in 1985), Metroid (1986, Nintendo Entertainment System) is generally considered the most influential game for the Metroidvania genre. Nintendo's goal for the title was to create a non-linear adventure game to set it apart from other games at the time, requiring the player to retrace their steps while providing permanent power-ups in contrast to how other adventure games only offered power-ups with temporary effects. The series was popular, and future titles refined the exploration approach while adding more story elements to the title such as with Super Metroid (1994, Super Nintendo Entertainment System). Super Metroid refined several aspects from the previous Metroid games, including a diverse array of locations and adding many secrets for players to find; these secrets also enabled players to find ways to break the expected sequence that the designers had envisioned players would approach the game, making it a popular title among speedrunners.

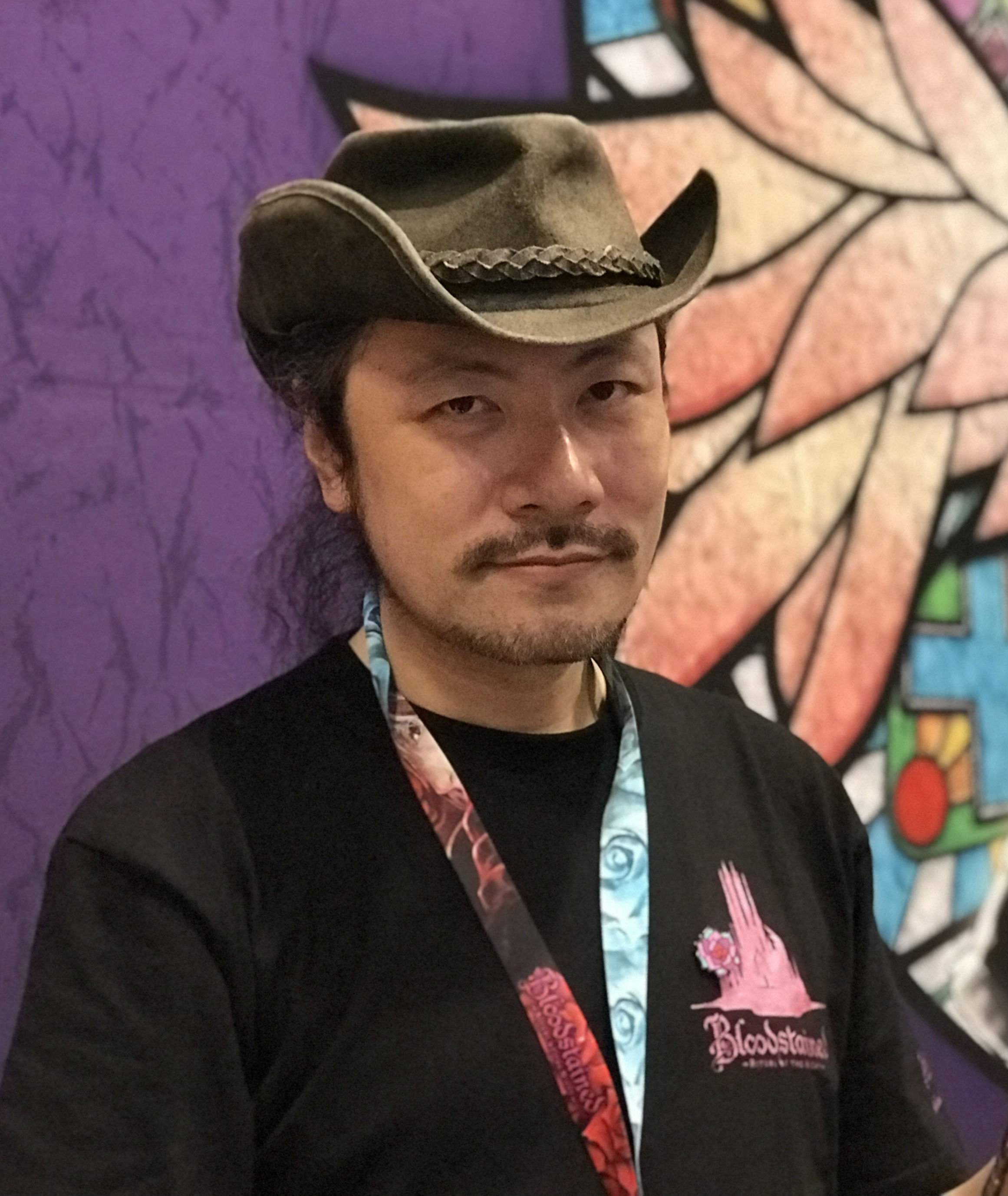
Koji Igarashi is credited with establishing defining features of the Metroidvania genre.

During this time, the gothic horror-themed platformer series Castlevania was gaining popularity. The original Castlevania (1986, NES) featured discrete levels that the player completed in a sequential manner. It was followed by Vampire Killer (1986, MSX) and Castlevania II: Simon's Quest (1987, NES) which experimented with non-linear adventure gameplay, before the series returned to the more linear style of the original Castlevania. Series lead Koji Igarashi found that as they continued to produce sequels to cater to fans of the series, experienced players would race through the levels, while new players to the series would struggle with some stages. To try to make a title that would be more widely appreciated across play levels and extend the gameplay time of the title, Igarashi and others on his team looked toward the ideas used by The Legend of Zelda series into the development of Castlevania: Symphony of the Night (1997, PlayStation). With Symphony of the Night, Igarashi introduced new concepts into the Castlevania series from Zelda such as a large open world to explore and the need to acquire key items to enter certain areas, elements already present in non-linear platformers like Super Metroid. However, Symphony of the Night distinguished itself from prior non-linear platformers via the incorporation of console role-playing game elements with the means for the player to improve their character's attributes through an experience system. The changes for Symphony of the Night proved popular with players, and most subsequent games in the series would follow this formula. With the releases of Super Metroid and Castlevania: Symphony of the Night, the formula these games presented would form the foundations of what are considered Metroidvanias today. Castlevania: Symphony of the Night had also become a critical and financial success over time, establishing that there was a desire by players for Metroidvania-style games. As this neologism started to be adopted, Igarashi stated that Symphony of the Night was more inspired by Zelda, not Metroid, although he stated that Metroidvania "fits very well". Other figures in the game industry have since used Zeldavania interchangeably, with the Zelda series recognized as following the same formula.

The concept of Metroidvanias started to gain more attraction when other parties began to develop games in the same style. Cave Story (2004, Microsoft Windows) was developed by Daisuke Amaya as an homage to Metroid and other classic games; the game was critically praised showing the scope of what one person could do, and highlighted another take on the Castlevania and Metroid games, as well as vitalizing the 2D platformer genre as a viable indie game format. Shadow Complex (2009, Xbox 360) by Chair Entertainment was developed based on the premise that Super Metroid was "the pinnacle of 2D game design". The game received highly positive reviews, and remains one of the best-selling downloadable titles on the Xbox 360 service. Due to games like these, the Metroidvania genre began to take off in both publisher-driven and independent games development. Drinkbox Studios' Guacamelee! (2013), Moon Studios' Ori and the Blind Forest (2015), and Team Cherry's Hollow Knight (2017) are examples of modern indie Metroidvanias that have reached critical acclaim. The genre's indie renaissance did not go unnoticed by Igarashi. In May 2015, he released a Kickstarter campaign for Castlevania-influenced Bloodstained: Ritual of the Night (2019), which was the highest-funded video game on Kickstarter at the time. By early 2025, there were over 2,200 games tagged as Metroidvanias on the game storefront Steam.

== Gameplay concepts ==
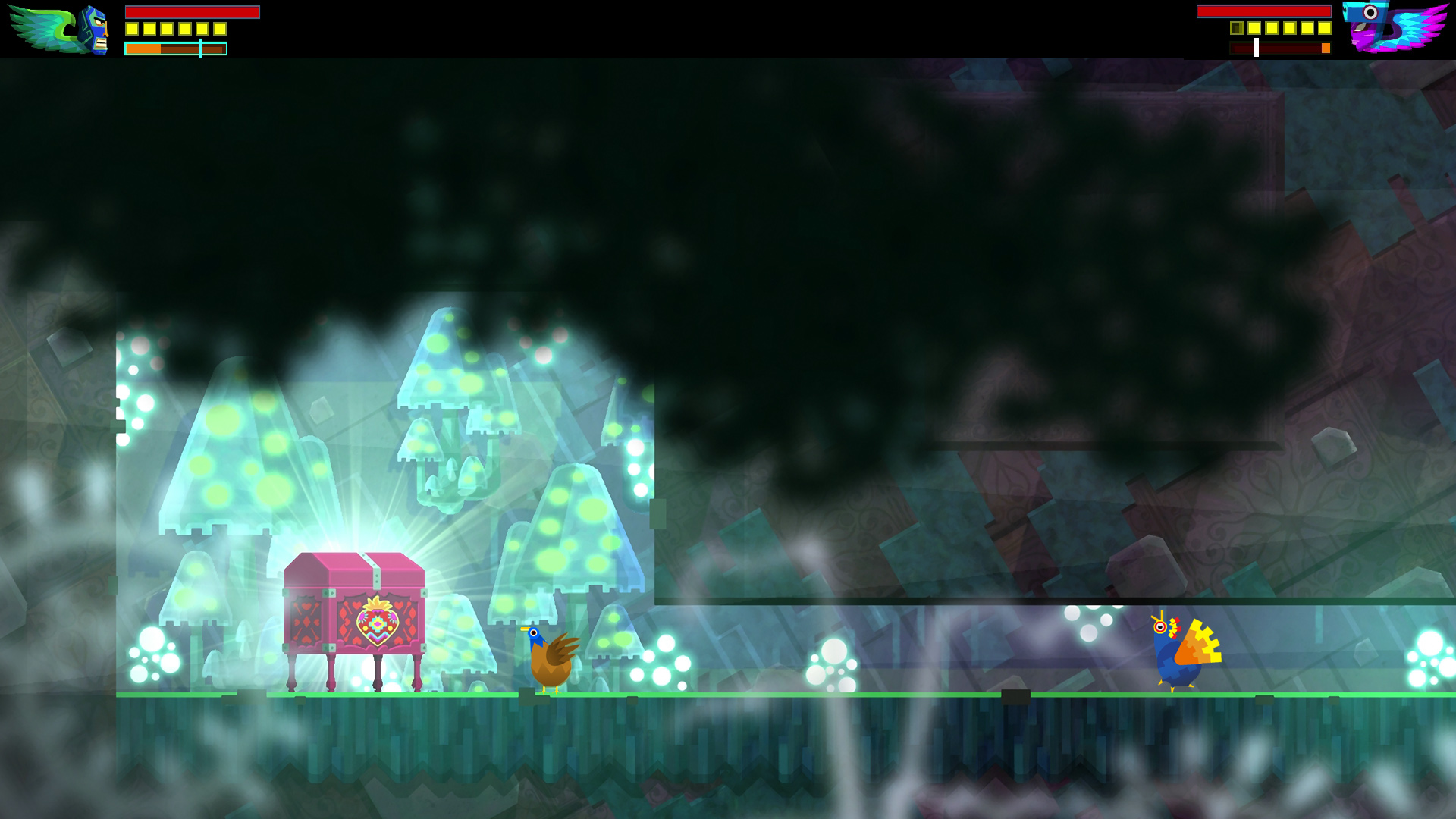
In Guacamelee!, the player gains the ability to temporarily turn their human character into a chicken, allowing them to pass through low-height corridors and discover secrets.

The term "Metroidvania" is most often used to refer to a platforming game that features a single large, interconnected map, generally with discrete rooms or sections. Not all areas of this map are available at the start, often requiring the player to obtain an item (such as a weapon or key) or a new character ability to remove some obstacle blocking the path forward. Often, this item is protected by a boss character, providing story-driven challenges throughout the game. Maps are non-linear, and often require the player to traverse the map multiple times during the course of the game. Weaker monsters will inhabit other parts of the level, re-spawning when the player revisits those rooms, and often can be defeated to gain health, ammunition, or experience points.

Larger games generally feature save points as well as the ability to transport the player quickly between certain rooms on far sides of the map, eliminating tedious backtracking in the later parts of the game. Access to new abilities can also open up shortcuts that reduce travel time, as well as discover secrets that help to improve the character's abilities. For example, gaining access to double jump or wall jump abilities can give players more mobility, while obtaining the ability to transform into a smaller object can let the player slip through narrow corridors. As such, the genre focuses on exploration of a large world map, and advancement of the player-character abilities over time. Metroidvanias are sometimes referred to as "platform adventure games" due to this scope.

Metroidvania is generally associated with game levels/maps that are laid out as two-dimensional side scrollers, with the player character moving left, right, up and down through the level. These games typically are rendered using two-dimensional graphics, but can include 2.5D-rendered games using 3D graphics engines but limiting player movement to two dimensions, such as the aforementioned Shadow Complex, or with Metroid Dread. The exploration and character development concepts of Metroidvanias can be used in other genres, though these games typically are not categorized as Metroidvanias. For example, the Metroid Prime series is a first-person action adventure game that builds on the same style of exploration play as Metroid. Dark Souls is a third-person action role-playing game loosely considered a Metroidvania featuring "soft locks" – obstacles in the form of boss characters that are difficult but not impossible to defeat when the player-character is starting out, and become much easier to defeat with increased experience and abilities. The third-person action/brawler Batman: Arkham series also uses similar concepts as a Metroidvania, with Batman collecting new gadgets to access new areas. The 2017 title Prey was developed as a first-person-perspective immersive sim but using Metroidvania level design concepts to require the player to traverse the setting multiple times as they gain additional tools and abilities. An even earlier attempt at bringing metroidvania gameplay to a first-person shooter was the console versions of the game PowerSlave in 1996 and 1997, as opposed to the more traditionally linear PC version.

Igarashi described what he believed were key elements in the genre. These include designing maps that encourage exploration but which still guide the player on a main path through the game and providing means where the player can be aware of where they are in the game world at any time. This can be accomplished by graphical themes through the game's world, visually unique milestones at key game point, overall map and player status information screens, and the means of moving around the map quickly. Russ Frushtick from Polygon observed that many modern Metroidvanias not only have these qualities, but also find a means to tell a narrative through the world's environments without necessarily relying on cutscenes or dialog.

In a 1UP.com video discussion between Parish, Sharkey, and Chris Kohler of Wired in 2007, the three discussed some older games that had elements associated with Metroidvanias but would not be considered true Metroidvanias, including games like Castlevania II: Simon's Quest (1987), Legacy of the Wizard (1987), and Adventure Island IV (1994). They argued that such games, while having 2D platforming gameplay and power-up based progression systems, lacked good level design, which at their time had not been well-refined in the industry, and provided little or no information relayed to the player to help them to know where to go next, exemplified by the cryptic clues from Simon's Quest. The three also agreed that as games transitioned from 2D to 3D, the true meaning of "Metroidvania" had become diluted, as 3D-based games can hide facets of Metroidvanias.

=== "Metroidbrainia" sub-genre ===
In September 2015, the term "Metroidbrainia" (a portmanteau of "Metroidvania" and "brain") was coined to describe a sub-genre of games characterized by progression systems which are gated entirely (or at least significantly) by player knowledge. Metroidbrainias typically offer a world with important areas and win conditions entirely open to the player from the earliest moments of the game, but instead of being locked behind in-game requirements or upgrades to the player character, they are locked simply because the player themself does not know how to reach or use them. As the player explores and learns more about the game's world and mechanics, they gain the ability to reach new areas, reveal new story details, and solve puzzles, all eventually leading to the knowledge required to progress and complete the game. Players can find new secrets while backtracking through areas not because the player character is better equipped but simply because the player now understands aspects of the game that they didn't before. Such games may reduce or eliminate the action portion of gameplay to favor puzzle solving, and can be characterized by a feeling of only being able to enjoy the game once, since the majority of the game experience comes from learning and understanding the mechanics of the game world and solving the mystery for the first time.

Outer Wilds (2019) is often cited as the best example of the genre, with other notable examples including Fez (2012), The Witness (2016), Return of the Obra Dinn (2018), Heaven's Vault (2019), Tunic (2022), Chants of Sennaar (2023), Animal Well (2024), and Leap Year (2024). Metroidbrainias are closely related to puzzle exploration games and adventure games such as Myst (1993).

== Analysis ==
The popularity of the Metroidvania genre is stated to be tied to the ease with which platformer games can be learned, while giving the player a character that they can grow over the course of the game. Many developers of independent Metroidvania titles cited the exploration as a core element of the genre that draws in players, working off the natural human instincts to explore, and giving the players the sense of discovery and self-control during the game. Donald Mustard of Chair Entertainment, the creators of Shadow Complex, said that a good Metroidvania helps the player come to epiphanies that enables them to progress in the game, describing an example of a ledge that is initially too high to reach, and as the player acquires abilities, will discover how they can reach that ledge on their own.

From a developer's standpoint, the Metroidvania genre also provides benefits. The genre encourages tight connection between level design and game story, and can give developers opportunities to create an immersive world for the player. Level design of such games can also be challenging as to make sure the challenge to the players of the game is fair and enjoyable, and achieving this goal can be seen as a sign of a success for a developer. Thomas Mahler of Moon Studios, who developed Ori and the Blind Forest, said that it was important to design a cohesive world with memorable settings for a Metroidvania, since "players remembering the levels is part of the core design". Large-scale development in this genre requires one change in the player's abilities to be tested more rigorously throughout all of the levels. Ori and the Will of the Wisps executive producer Daniel Smith said: "I don't think people generally consider how difficult it is to make a Metroidvania game. Everything is so interconnected that if you change one aspect of the game, it's just inevitable that it's going to influence the rest".

== See also ==
- Nonlinear gameplay
- Open world
- Soulslike
