= Grunn =

2024 video game

- Developer: Sokpop Collective
- Publisher: Sokpop Collective
- Engine: Unity
- Platform: Microsoft Windows
- Release: 2024
- Genres: Simulation, horror
- Mode: Single-player

Grunn is a 2024 gardening-themed simulation video game with horror elements developed by Dutch independent developer Tom van den Boogaart, a member of the independent studio Sokpop Collective. In the game, the player controls a character who travels by bus to a Dutch village, where they are tasked with maintaining a garden while uncovering hidden mysteries. The game received praise from critics for its contrast between the appearance of a casual gardening simulation and its underlying horror themes.

== Gameplay ==
Grunn is played from a first-person perspective. The player assumes the role of a character who travels by bus to a village in the Netherlands to maintain the garden of an absent homeowner. Gardening tasks include clipping tall grass, digging up molehills, and watering plants.

In addition to gardening, the player can explore the surrounding village, which features non-Euclidean architecture. Exploration reveals various puzzles and unsettling elements, such as corpses, ghosts that appear after sundown, and randomly spawning gnomes. Polaroid photographs scattered throughout the environment provide hints for puzzles and persist across multiple playthroughs. The player can find tools, keys and items to progress and unlock more areas. The player can interact with local residents, though the player character doesn't understand what most characters say.

== Plot ==
In 2001, the unnamed player character arrives in a Dutch village by bus Saturday morning. The player character is tasked with cleaning up the garden by Monday through a note left by the absent homeowner, F. H. Postma. The player can explore the house's garden and surrounding village, solving puzzles and finding items to progress. Throughout town the player can find evidence of multiple murders, and supernatural entities lurking in the village.

The game features eleven possible endings, most of which result in the player's death. If the player completes gardening in the three main areas of the village, they can find a picnic blanket, a sandwich and a small grove to have a picnic, which ends the game. The player can also choose to leave the village on Monday by bus the same way they arrived.

In the good ending, the player character discovers F. H. Postma, the home's owner, has died before they arrived, and was investigating supernatural entities hiding within the village. The player character collects four idols corresponding to four of the entities, and returns them to the village church, which spawns a demon intent on destroying the world. The player character talks with the ghost of Postma who tells them to take their blessed sword to destroy the demon, which they accomplish. The player can optionally collect fragments of the Postma's soul before attacking the demon, which brings Postma back to life. Postma thanks the player character for their actions, and tells them that maintaining the garden wasn't that important to them after all, and they are free to leave.

== Development ==
Grunn was developed by Tom van den Boogaart and published by Sokpop Collective. Its release date was announced in a trailer in September 2024, and the game was released on October 4, 2024.

The game's hidden elements draw inspiration from European folklore. According to the developers, the marketing was designed to present the title primarily as a gardening game, downplaying its horror aspects.

== Reception ==
According to review aggregator Metacritic, Grunn received "generally favorable" reviews.

Rock, Paper, Shotgun described the demo as enjoyable, and in a later review characterized the game's secrets as "dark and silly," comparing its mysterious gameplay to "napping and waking up to a thrashing anomaly in the space between the walls." The Guardian praised the game's hidden elements, while Eurogamer described its endings as "pleasantly skin-crawling." Polygon noted that the game was difficult to categorize, highlighting its visuals and the amount of content relative to the village's small size. GamesRadar+ considered the gardening mechanics a clever decoy, suggesting that the game's real focus lay in its secrets, which made players feel like "surreal detectives."

The Academy of Interactive Arts & Sciences nominated Grunn for "Outstanding Achievement for an Independent Game" at the 28th Annual D.I.C.E. Awards.

Grunn was awarded "Best Game" and "Best Gamedesign" at the 2025 Dutch Game Awards. The jury praised the subtle design of the game, 'encouraging the player to explore further and piece together the story'.

== See also ==
- Bernband - another game developed by Tom van den Boogaart
