= Bernband =

2014 video game

- Developer: Tom van den Boogaart
- Platforms: Windows, macOS, Linux
- Release: 23 September 2014
- Genre: Adventure
- Mode: Single-player

Bernband is a 2014 video game by Dutch independent developer Tom van den Boogaart, a member of the Dutch independent studio Sokpop Collective. The game is an open-ended walking simulator set in an alien city, with no objectives or milestones. Critics praised the design of Bernband for its immersive setting, with the game inspiring the parallel development of Hernhand by Australian independent developer Jake Clover in 2015. A remake was officially revealed in June 2025, with the release date to be announced.

== Gameplay ==
A screenshot of Bernband

Bernband is a walking simulator in which players explore "the city of the Pff" across "23 unique locations to discover." Players use the cursor and directional keys to explore a series of spaces connected by doors in an alien city, including train stations, bars and art galleries. Whilst the city is occupied with alien inhabitants that wander the spaces at random, they are not interactable and do not respond to the player. The game does not contain an interface or a map, and players are left to navigate the spaces in the city without clear directions.

== Reception ==
Critics praised Bernband for its sense of scale and atmosphere. Shaun Prescott of PC Gamer praised the game for its "oddly hypnotic experience", stating that the lack of guidance and direction and minimal interface add to "the sense of place". Jack de Quidt for Vice praised the memorable design of the city Pff as an "alien city that glitters and rumbles and opens itself out to you in a warren of corridors and plazas." Writing for Boing Boing, Rob Beschizza stated "Bernband toys with a grim but playful tradition of surreal possibility hidden in impassive urban forms, where ducts and serviceways are the fairy portals offering glimpses of the labyrinth, the places waiting to be remembered." Chris Priestman of Kill Screen stated that the game was a "highly accomplished multiplex of connected dark future-city scenes," praising the game for its realism and stating "Bernband's city is interconnected in a way (that) feels believable, like a proper bizarre city." Gracie Lu Straznickas stated the game typified an emerging genre of "slice of life" games as titles that "offer a contained world" with a "focus on daily life" and contain no overarching goals or objectives that "demonstrate the concept of exploration without destination."

Bernband received praise from the outlet Rock Paper Shotgun as one of the best games of 2014 and of all time. In the initial review for the publication, Alice O'Connor praised the game's impressionistic approach, stating "The lo-fi look, a forced low-res filter, blown-out sound, and simple AI drag Bernband so far into the abstract and imagination that it feels real and exciting." The website proceeded to name the game as one of the "best of 2014", stating "Bernband is impressive over and above other walking simulators because it wrings atmosphere and a strong sense of place from such a small number of pieces," stating " it sucks you in and takes you to that place with music, lighting, and a pixellated filter that turns rough edges into an aesthetic." In 2019, the website named the game as one of the "greatest PC games of the 2010s", and in 2022, the website named the game as the 20th greatest game of all time.

== Legacy ==
Bernband was influential to the development of several independent titles that claimed inspiration from the game. Hernhand, developed by Melbourne-based independent developer Jake Clover, was inspired by an early preview of Bernband and developed in tandem with van den Boogaart with both developers "sharing our work and progress" as a "collaboration". Similar to Bernband, Hernhand is a walking simulator through an alien city, although the game was described by Kill Screen as "less a unified city and more of an abstract nightmare", praising its "dark" and "peculiar" qualities. Born Under Saturn was an unofficial release published by Nerbons in 2020 that pairs the environment of Bernband with first person shooter mechanics.

== Remake ==
van den Boogaart has continued development on a new version of Bernband, and posted updates on his Twitter account featuring the game with updated graphics and new environments. A remake was officially announced for Steam on June 8 at the PC Gaming Show 2025, with no set release date.

== See also ==
- Grunn - another game developed by Tom van den Boogaart
