= Skydance's Behemoth =

2024 video game

- Developer: Skydance Interactive
- Publisher: Skydance Interactive
- Director: Brian Murphy
- Artist: Michael 'Maxx' Kaufman
- Writer: Frank Barbiere
- Composer: Andrea Bellucci
- Platforms: Meta Quest 2; Meta Quest 3; Meta Quest 3S; PlayStation VR2; SteamVR
- Release: December 5, 2024
- Genre: Action-adventure
- Mode: Single-player

Skydance's Behemoth is a 2024 virtual reality action-adventure video game developed and published by Skydance Interactive for Meta Quest 2, Meta Quest 3, PlayStation VR2, and SteamVR. It received mixed reviews upon release.

== Gameplay ==
The game is a first-person action-adventure video game. The player assumes control of a hunter named Wren, who must embark on a journey to slay colossal beings known as the Behemoths in an effort to lift a curse that plagues the land. The player can use their melee weapons to strike, block or parry incoming attacks. Attacking, defending and climbing all drain Wren of their stamina. They can also use a bow and arrows to kill enemies from afar. Wren is equipped with a grappling hook, allowing him to reach distant areas, unlock blocked paths, or trigger environmental hazards to damage enemies. Behemoth encounters serve as the game's boss battles. The game has a total of four behemoths, with each having their own strengths and weaknesses.

== Development ==
The game was developed by Skydance Interactive, the team behind The Walking Dead: Saints & Sinners and its sequel, Chapter 2: Retribution. The combat and physics system from Saints & Sinners were refined in this game, though the game had a larger emphasis on combat and a smaller focus on survival. As opposed to Saints & Sinners, Behemoth features large and open levels, allowing players to approach their objectives freely. Shawn Kittelsen, Vice President of Creative, added the team spent a lot of time creating the scale of the world. The Behemoths were designed to be gigantic, and the team kept scaling them up throughout the course of the game's development. According to Kittelsen, Behemoth encounters served as "exceptional punctuation points" along the campaign.

Skydance's Behemoth was first announced at The Game Awards 2022, and was set to be released in late 2023. The game was released on December 5, 2024, for Meta Quest 2, Meta Quest 3, PlayStation VR2, and SteamVR.

== Reception ==
Reception

Aggregate score
Aggregator	Score
Metacritic	(PC) 68/100 (PS5) 56/100 (Quest) 76/100

Review scores
Publication	Score
Eurogamer	2/5 stars
Push Square	4/10

With the exception of the Meta Quest version, which received "generally favorable reviews", Skydance's Behemoth received "mixed or average" reviews according to review aggregator Metacritic.

Scott Hayden from RoadtoVR described the game as a "a colossal step forward in VR action-adventure gaming", strongly praising the game's combat and the boss battles for putting a player's skill to the test. Ian Higton from Eurogamer gave the game a negative review. While he praised the boss battles for being "impressive", he noted that they were "few and far between", appearing only sporadically. He was frustrated by its checkpoint system, which forced players to replay long segments of the game after each defeat. Aaron Bayne from Push Square concluded his review by writing that "the enormity of its Behemoths works excellently in VR, but at almost every turn, the game bogs you down with bugs, repetitive gameplay loops, and underdeveloped level design", ultimately describing it as a "a massive missed opportunity".

The game was nominated for Immersive Reality Technical Achievement and Immersive Reality Game of the Year at the 28th Annual D.I.C.E. Awards.
