= Leap Year (video game) =

2024 video game

- Publisher: Sokpop Collective
- Engine: GameMaker
- Platforms: Windows; Nintendo Switch
- Release: Windows; 14 June 2024; Nintendo Switch; 5 February 2026
- Genre: Puzzle

Leap Year is a puzzle-platformer video game developed in 2024 by Daniel Linssen and published by Sokpop Collective. Creating using GameMaker Engine, Leap Year is playable on Windows. It would later receive downloadable content on February 28, 2025 known as Leap Year March.

== Gameplay ==
Leap Year is a puzzle-platformer Metroidbrainia game in which the days of the month of February have gone missing and the player must find and collect them. The game revolves around secret movement abilities that the player has from the beginning but simply does not know about, which are slowly revealed through trial and error and clues carved into the background of the world. The player character is highly fragile and will die having fallen even from heights that they jumped from, which requires the usage of things such as steps or ceilings to their advantage.

== Development ==
Leap Year was developed by Daniel Linssen and published by Sokpop Collective. It was commissioned by Sokpop Collective as part of their takeover program, where they commission their favorite artists to make a game for their one game a month plan. The game would later receive downloadable content in February 28, 2025 known as Leap Year March with the same gameplay and using skills previously acquired in Leap Year, just with the goal being to collect the missing days for the month of March.

== Reception ==
GameSpark stated it was aligned with some of the puzzle games considered the best, such as Animal Well, Blue Prince, and Lorelei and the Laser Eyes. Polygon stated "that the game trades approachability for simplicity" but that they were happy regardless due to its cleverness. Gamekult described is as brilliant and innovative yet overlooked.
