= Sokpop Collective =

Dutch video game developer

- Type: Collective
- Industry: Video games
- Founded: 2015; 11 years ago
- Headquarters: Utrecht, Netherlands
- Key people: Aran Koning; Tijmen Tio; Tom van den Boogaart; Ruben Naus
- Products: simmiland; Chatventures; Pocket Watch; Stacklands
- Number of employees: 4
- Website: sokpop.co

Sokpop Collective, also known as simply Sokpop (Dutch for "sock puppet"), is an independent video game development studio located in Utrecht, The Netherlands. The studio started working on videogames in 2017 and consists of four people. The studio is run as a collective, with no formal leadership structure or managers, but a flat hierarchy where everyone works as equals.

Sokpop is known for releasing one new game each month. They run a Patreon, where they sell these games through a subscription-like model, in addition to selling the games on Steam and Itch.io for non-patrons. A couple of their games have become hits, such as simmiland and Stacklands, the latter of which won the "Best Innovation" award at the 2022 Dutch Game Awards. The collective itself was given the "Awesome Achievement Award" that same year.

== History ==
The four developers that make up Sokpop met in 2013, then they started to participate in a big number of game jams together, such as Ludum Dare. When there wasn't a formal game jam to go to, they'd host one at home. The collective grew from that, leading the four of them to embark on what's become an "infinite game jam".

Sokpop is known for their ability to develop and release small games at a rapid pace. Between 2017 and 2020 Sokpop released an average of a new game every 2 weeks. By May 2020 they had released 54 games, by March 2021 that number had increased to 78. Since 2021 they have changed their release schedule to one new game per month, so they could increase their projects' scope and spend more time on each individual idea. Despite this rapid release schedule, reviewers have noted that the games are polished, and surprisingly deep and complex mechanically. Eric Schoon of The Review Geek named Sokpop as "one of the most interesting things going on in the indie gaming scene right now", and that "the balance of variety and quality on display is unmatched anywhere else in the games industry, especially when you consider the release schedule."

Despite working at the same studio, the developers at Sokpop rarely collaborate. Most of the games are developed individually, so rather than working on a new game every month, each developer has 4 months to work on their game before release.

Initially Sokpop funded their projects through Patreon and itch.io, effectively selling their games like a magazine subscription service, but when they started releasing their games on Steam, sales on that platform earned them more than Patreon and itch.io sales combined.

A number of Sokpop's games have become unexpected hits, such as simmiland in 2018, a digital card game that got picked up by YouTubers and streamers, resulting in the game selling particularly well on itch.io. Stacklands, a game released in 2022 that combines deck-building with village building and resource management, became both a critical and commercial success. It was nominated for Excellence in Design at the 25th annual Independent Games Festival, and for Best Game, Best Innovation, and Best Game Design at the Dutch Game Awards, where in addition to winning "Best Innovation", the studio itself was awarded the "Awesome Achievement Award". Grunn was nominated for "Outstanding Achievement for an Independent Game" at the 28th Annual D.I.C.E. Awards.

In December of 2026, one of the 4 developers left the collective to pursue independent projects.

== Games ==
- Bamboo EP (December 2016)
- jut (January 2018)
- bombini (January 2018)
- Dr. Umgebung's School of Life (January 2018)
- New Colony (February 2018)
- King Of The Sandcastle (February 2018)
- moeras (March 2018)
- dino game (March 2018)
- driftwood (April 2018)
- Hoco Poco (May 2018)
- tomscape (May 2018)
- kamer (May 2018)
- huts (June 2018)
- Zoo Packs (June 2018)
- botanik (July 2018)
- spider ponds (July 2018)
- llama villa (August 2018)
- simmiland (August 2018)
- hoppa (August 2018)
- soko loco (September 2018)
- Oh Crab! (September 2018)
- visser (October 2018)
- Doler (October 2018)
- frog struggles (November 2018)
- skidlocked (November 2018)
- kraken's curse (December 2018)
- clutchball (December 2018)
- Peppered (January 2019)
- capy hoky (January 2019)
- Brume (January 2019)
- Featherfall (February 2019)
- Penguin Park 3D (February 2019)
- kart kids (March 2019)
- bandapes (April 2019)
- sok-stories (April 2019)
- passenger seat (April 2019)
- wamu wamu 2 (May 2019)
- Pear Quest (May 2019)
- The Hour of the Rat (June 2019)
- rook (June 2019)
- pilfer (July 2019)
- Ollie & Bollie: Outdoor Estate (July 2019)
- bobo robot (August 2019)
- Sproots (August 2019)
- Good Goods Inc (August 2019)
- klym (September 2019)
- Sunset Kingdom (September 2019)
- fishy (October 2019)
- Sokbots (October 2019)
- Pupper Park (November 2019)
- Soko Loco Deluxe (November 2019)
- deer hunter II (December 2019)
- Uniseas (December 2019)
- Goblet Cave (December 2019)
- blue drifter (January 2020)
- labyrinth (January 2020)
- Chatventures (February 2020)
- sok-worlds (February 2020)
- clickbox (March 2020)
- Ginseng Hero (March 2020)
- Yardlings (April 2020)
- disc party (April 2020)
- Popo's Tower (May 2020)
- helionaut (June 2020)
- Lairchitect (June 2020)
- dead run (July 2020)
- Rock Paper Sock (July 2020)
- pyramida (August 2020)
- Woodland Saga (August 2020)
- Flipper Volcano (August 2020)
- Grey Scout (September 2020)
- Fishy 3D (October 2020)
- King Pins (October 2020)
- skelets (October 2020)
- Pipo Park (November 2020)
- Pocket Watch (December 2020)
- bloks (December 2020)
- n-body (January 2021)
- vissekom (January 2021)
- post cards (January 2021)
- Wild-9 (February 2021)
- Hamster All-Stars (February 2021)
- Toverblade (March 2021)
- Kochu's Dream (May 2021)
- Beastrun (May 2021)
- Aran's Bike Trip (July 2021)
- Hellblusser (July 2021)
- Heliopedia (August 2021)
- Apocalich (September 2021)
- Dungeonball (November 2021)
- Di-Da-Dobble (November 2021)
- Luckitown (January 2022)
- TEMPLE of RUBBO (February 2022)
- Stacklands (March 2022)
- White Lavender (May 2022)
- Guardener (June 2022)
- tile tale (June 2022)
- Tuin (August 2022)
- Ballspell (September 2022)
- wurdweb (November 2022)
- Springblades (November 2022)
- Sokfest (February 2023)
- Frog's Adventure (June 2023)
- Mistward (October 2023)
- clickyland (June 2024)
- Grunn (October 2024)
- Hideko (December 2024)
- Bachelairs (February 2025)
- Sokker (October 2025)
- "Gnomeball" (October 2025)
- Brain School (December 2025)
- "Grail" (September 2026)
- "Rat Game" (October 2026)
- Bernband (TBA) (Note: Remake of the 2014 original)
