= Rokoko (company) =

Danish consumer motion capture and animation technology manufacturer

- Type: Anpartsselskab
- Traded as: Rokoko Electronics ApS
- Industry: Consumer motion capture, animation technology
- Founded: March 2014 in Copenhagen, Denmark
- Founders: Jakob Balslev, Matias Søndergaard, and Anders Klok
- Headquarters: Copenhagen, Denmark
- Number of locations: Copenhagen, Denmark; Athens, Greece, San Francisco, USA
- Area served: Worldwide
- Number of employees: 100 (2021)
- Website: rokoko.com

Rokoko is a Danish brand of consumer motion capture and animation technology products. It was founded in 2015 in Copenhagen, Denmark with additional offices located in Athens, Greece, and San Francisco, US. It manufactures the Smartsuit Pro, an IMU motion capture suit used by animators, game developers, vTubers.

== History ==
Rokoko was founded by Jakob Balslev, Matias Søndergaard, and Anders Klok in March 2014, however the idea came to them when they were at the National Film School of Denmark. Initially, they launched a Kickstarter campaign for the Smartsuit Pro. The motion capture technology, unveiled in December 2016, uses a wireless body suit and integrates with software development platforms. The company also produces the Smartgloves for finger tracking, as well as software for face tracking.

Smartsuit Pro II, the next generation of Smartsuit Pro, was announced in 2021.
