= British Academy Games Awards =

Annual awards for video game achievements

BAFTA Games Awards
- Current: 22nd British Academy Games Awards
- Awarded for: Outstanding creative achievement in games
- Country: United Kingdom
- Formerly called: BAFTA Video Games Awards
- First award: February 2004; 22 years ago
- Website: bafta.org

The BAFTA Games Awards or British Academy Games Awards are an annual British awards ceremony honouring "outstanding creative achievement" in the video game industry. First presented in 2004 following the restructuring of the BAFTA Interactive Entertainment Awards, the awards are presented by the British Academy of Film and Television Arts (BAFTA).

Since the inaugural BAFTA Games Awards in February 2004, twenty-two ceremonies have taken place. The most recent, the 22nd British Academy Games Awards, were held at the Queen Elizabeth Hall on 17 April 2026.

== Categories ==
- Animation (2004–2005, revived in 2020)
- Artistic Achievement
- Audio Achievement
- Best Game
- British Game (introduced in 2013)
- Debut Game (introduced in 2013)
- EE Game of the Year (introduced in 2018, formerly EE Mobile Game, audience-voted award)
- Evolving Game (introduced in 2015)
- Family (previously "Children's Game")
- BAFTA Fellowship (presented sporadically)
- Game Beyond Entertainment (introduced in 2017)
- Game Design (introduced in 2012)
- Intellectual Property (previously "Originality" and "Original Property")
- Multiplayer
- Music
- Narrative (previously "Screenplay/Story")
- Performer in a Leading Role
- Performer in a Supporting Role
- Special Award (presented sporadically)
- Technical Achievement (Renamed from "Game Innovation" in 2020)
- Young Game Designers (five per year)

Defunct

- Action Game
- Adventure Game
- Animation or Intro
- Art Direction
- Best Character
- Casual and Social Game
- Game Boy Advance Game
- Game Innovation (renamed to "Technical Achievement" in 2020)
- GameCube Game
- Gameplay
- Handheld Game
- Mobile Game (retired by 2020)
- One to Watch Award
- Online Game
- PC Game
- British Academy Games Award for Performer (split into two categories in 2020)
- PS2 Game
- Puzzle Game
- Racing Game
- Simulation Game
- Sound
- Sports Game
- Strategy Game
- Sunday Times Reader's Award
- Xbox Game

== Ceremonies ==
| Event | Date | Host | Location | Best Game |
|---|---|---|---|---|
| 1st | 25 February 2004 | Bill Bailey | Radisson Portman Hotel, London | Call of Duty |
| 2nd | 1 March 2005 | Jonathan Ross | Café Royal | Half-Life 2 |
| 3rd | 5 October 2006 | Vernon Kay | Roundhouse | Tom Clancy's Ghost Recon Advanced Warfighter |
| 4th | 23 October 2007 | Vic Reeves | Battersea Evolution | BioShock |
| 5th | 10 March 2009 | Dara Ó Briain | London Hilton | Super Mario Galaxy |
| 6th | 19 March 2010 | Dara Ó Briain | London Hilton | Batman: Arkham Asylum |
| 7th | 16 March 2011 | Dara Ó Briain | London Hilton | Mass Effect 2 |
| 8th | 16 March 2012 | Dara Ó Briain | London Hilton | Portal 2 |
| 9th | 5 March 2013 | Dara Ó Briain | London Hilton | Dishonored |
| 10th | 12 March 2014 | Dara Ó Briain | Tobacco Dock | The Last of Us |
| 11th | 12 March 2015 | Rufus Hound | Tobacco Dock | Destiny |
| 12th | 7 April 2016 | Dara Ó Briain | Tobacco Dock | Fallout 4 |
| 13th | 6 April 2017 | Danny Wallace | Tobacco Dock | Uncharted 4: A Thief's End |
| 14th | 12 April 2018 | Dara Ó Briain | Troxy | What Remains of Edith Finch |
| 15th | 4 April 2019 | Dara Ó Briain | Queen Elizabeth Hall | God of War |
| 16th | 2 April 2020 | Dara Ó Briain | —N/a (Note: The 2020 and 2021 ceremonies were held virtually due to the COVID-19 pandemic.) | Outer Wilds |
| 17th | 25 March 2021 | Elle Osili-Wood | —N/a | Hades |
| 18th | 8 April 2022 | Elle Osili-Wood | Queen Elizabeth Hall | Returnal |
| 19th | 30 March 2023 | Frankie Ward | Queen Elizabeth Hall | Vampire Survivors |
| 20th | 11 April 2024 | Phil Wang | Queen Elizabeth Hall | Baldur's Gate 3 |
| 21st | 8 April 2025 | Phil Wang | Queen Elizabeth Hall | Astro Bot |
| 22nd | 17 April 2026 | Elz the Witch | Queen Elizabeth Hall | Clair Obscur: Expedition 33 |

== Winners ==
The BAFTA ceremonies are typically held in March or April of each year. In some years, BAFTA has given out additional awards just prior to the Electronic Entertainment Expo event, which happens in May or June of the year.

=== 2003 ===
The 2003 ceremony took place in February 2004.

- Action Game – Grand Theft Auto: Vice City
- Adventure Game – The Legend of Zelda: The Wind Waker
- Animation or Intro – Soulcalibur II (Jame Chung Edition)
- Children's Game – EyeToy: Play
- Design – Grand Theft Auto: Vice City
- Game Boy Advance Game – Advance Wars 2: Black Hole Rising
- Game on Any Platform – The Year's Best Game – Call of Duty
- GameCube – Metroid Prime
- Mobile Game – Tony Hawk's Pro Skater
- Multiplayer – Battlefield 1942
- Original Music – Harry Potter and the Chamber of Secrets
- PC – Grand Theft Auto: Vice City
- PS2 – Grand Theft Auto: Vice City
- Racing – Project Gotham Racing 2
- Sound – Grand Theft Auto: Vice City
- Sports – FIFA Football 2004
- Strategy – Advance Wars 2: Black Hole Rising
- Sunday Times Reader Award for Games – Grand Theft Auto: Vice City
- Technical Achievement – EyeToy: Play
- Xbox – Star Wars: Knights of the Old Republic
- Special Award (Games) – Chris Deering

=== 2004 ===
The 2004 ceremony took place on 1 March 2005.

- Action Game – Half-Life 2
- Animation – Half-Life 2
- Art Direction – Half-Life 2
- Audio Achievement – Call of Duty: Finest Hour
- Best Game – Half-Life 2
- Children's – Donkey Konga
- GameCube – Prince of Persia: Warrior Within
- Handheld – Colin McRae Rally 2005
- Mobile Game – BlueTooth BiPlanes
- Online Multiplayer – Half-Life 2
- Original Music – Hitman: Contracts
- Originality – SingStar/Singstar Party
- PC – Half-Life 2
- PS2 – Burnout 3: Takedown
- Racing – Burnout 3: Takedown
- Sports – Pro Evolution Soccer 4
- Sunday Times Reader Award for Games – Football Manager 2005
- Technical Direction – Burnout 3: Takedown
- Xbox – Halo 2
- Special Award (Games) – Sam Houser & Leslie Benzies

=== 2006 ===
The 2006 ceremony took place at The Roundhouse on 5 October 2006 and was hosted by Vernon Kay.

- Action and Adventure (Sponsored by PC World) – Shadow of the Colossus
- Artistic Achievement – Shadow of the Colossus
- Audio Achievement – Electroplankton
- Best Game (Sponsored by PC World) – Tom Clancy's Ghost Recon Advanced Warfighter
- Casual and Social – Buzz!: The BIG Quiz
- Character – LocoRoco (LocoRoco)
- Children's – LocoRoco
- Gameplay (Sponsored by Nokia N-Gage) – Lego Star Wars II: The Original Trilogy
- Gamers' Award (Sponsored by Nokia N-Gage) – 24: The Mobile Game
- Innovation – Dr. Kawashima's Brain Training: How Old Is Your Brain?
- Multiplayer – Dungeons and Dragons Online: Stormreach
- Original Score – Tomb Raider: Legend
- Screenplay – Psychonauts
- Simulation – The Movies
- Soundtrack – Guitar Hero
- Sports – Fight Night Round 3
- Strategy – Rise and Fall: Civilizations at War
- Technical Achievement (Sponsored by Skillset) – Tom Clancy's Ghost Recon Advanced Warfighter

=== 2007 ===
The 2007 ceremony took place at Battersea Evolution on 23 October 2007 and was hosted by Vic Reeves.

- Action and Adventure (Sponsored by PC World) – Crackdown
- Artistic Achievement – Ōkami
- Best Game – BioShock
- Casual – Wii Sports
- Gameplay (Sponsored by Nokia N-Gage) – Wii Sports
- Innovation – Wii Sports
- Multiplayer – Wii Sports
- Original Score – Ōkami
- Sports – Wii Sports
- Story and Character – God of War II
- Strategy and Simulation – Wii Sports
- Technical Achievement – God of War II
- Use of Audio – Crackdown
- BAFTA One's To Watch Award (in association with Dare to Be Digital) – Ragnarawk
- The PC World Gamers Award (voted for by the public) – Football Manager 2007
- Academy Fellowship – Will Wright

=== 2008 ===
The 2008 ceremony took place at London Hilton on 10 March 2009 and was hosted by Dara Ó Briain.

- Action and Adventure – Fable II
- Artistic Achievement – LittleBigPlanet
- Best Game – Super Mario Galaxy
- Casual – Boom Blox
- Gameplay – Call of Duty 4: Modern Warfare
- Handheld – Professor Layton and the Curious Village
- Multiplayer – Left 4 Dead
- Original Score – Dead Space
- Sports – Race Driver: Grid
- Strategy – Civilization Revolution
- Story and Character – Call of Duty 4: Modern Warfare
- Technical Achievement – Spore
- Use of Audio – Dead Space
- BAFTA One's to Watch Award (in association with Dare to Be Digital) – Boro-Toro
- GAME Award of 2008 – Call of Duty 4: Modern Warfare
- Academy Fellowship – Nolan Bushnell

=== 2009 ===
The 2009 ceremony took place at London Hilton 19 March 2010 and was hosted by Dara Ó Briain.

- Action – Uncharted 2: Among Thieves
- Artistic Achievement – Flower
- Best Game – Batman: Arkham Asylum
- Family & Social – Wii Sports Resort
- Gameplay – Batman: Arkham Asylum
- Handheld – LittleBigPlanet
- Multiplayer – Left 4 Dead 2
- Original Score – Uncharted 2: Among Thieves
- Sports – FIFA 10
- Story – Uncharted 2: Among Thieves
- Strategy – Empire: Total War
- Use of Audio – Uncharted 2: Among Thieves
- Use of Online – FIFA 10
- BAFTA One's to Watch Award (in association with Dare to Be Digital) – Shrunk!
- GAME Award of 2009 – Call of Duty: Modern Warfare 2
- Academy Fellowship – Shigeru Miyamoto

=== 2010 ===
The 2010 ceremony took place at London Hilton on 16 March 2011 and was hosted by Dara Ó Briain.

- Action – Assassin's Creed: Brotherhood
- Artistic Achievement – God of War III
- Best Game – Mass Effect 2
- Family – Kinect Sports
- Gameplay – Super Mario Galaxy 2
- Handheld – Cut the Rope
- Multiplayer – Need for Speed: Hot Pursuit
- Original Music – Heavy Rain
- Puzzle – Rooms: The Main Building
- Social Network Game – My Empire
- Sports – F1 2010
- Story – Heavy Rain
- Strategy – Civilization V
- Technical Innovation – Heavy Rain
- Use of Audio – Battlefield: Bad Company 2
- BAFTA Ones to Watch Award (in association with Dare to Be Digital) – Twang!
- GAME Award of 2010 – Call of Duty: Black Ops
- Academy Fellowship – Peter Molyneux

=== 2011 ===
The 2011 ceremony took place at London Hilton on 16 March 2012 and was hosted by Dara Ó Briain.

- Action – Batman: Arkham City
- Artistic Achievement – Rayman Origins
- Audio Achievement – Battlefield 3
- Best Game – Portal 2
- Debut Game – Insanely Twisted Shadow Planet
- Family – LittleBigPlanet 2
- Game Design – Portal 2
- Game Innovation – LittleBigPlanet 2
- Mobile & Handheld – Peggle HD
- Online – Browser – Monstermind
- Online Multiplayer – Battlefield 3
- Original Music – L.A. Noire
- Performer – Mark Hamill (as The Joker, Batman: Arkham City)
- Sports/Fitness – Kinect Sports: Season Two
- Story – Portal 2
- Strategy – Total War: Shogun 2
- BAFTA Ones To Watch Award (in association with Dare to Be Digital) – Tick Tock Toys
- GAME Award of 2011 – Battlefield 3
- Special – Markus Persson

=== 2012 ===
The 2012 ceremony took place at London Hilton on 5 March 2013 and was hosted by Dara Ó Briain.

- Action – Far Cry 3
- Artistic Achievement – Journey
- Audio Achievement – Journey
- Best Game – Dishonored
- British Game – The Room
- Debut Game – The Unfinished Swan
- Family – Lego Batman 2: DC Super Heroes
- Game Design – Journey
- Game Innovation – The Unfinished Swan
- Mobile & Handheld – The Walking Dead
- Online – Browser – SongPop
- Online Multiplayer – Journey
- Original Music – Journey
- Performer – Danny Wallace (as the narrator, Thomas Was Alone)
- Sports/Fitness – New Star Soccer
- Story – The Walking Dead
- Strategy – XCOM: Enemy Unknown
- BAFTA Ones to Watch Award (in association with Dare to Be Digital) – Starcrossed
- Academy Fellowship – Gabe Newell

=== 2013 ===
The 2013 ceremony took place at Tobacco Dock on 12 March 2014 and was hosted by Dara Ó Briain.

- Action & Adventure – The Last of Us
- Artistic Achievement – Tearaway
- Audio Achievement - The Last of Us
- Best Game – The Last of Us
- British Game – Grand Theft Auto V
- Debut Game – Gone Home
- Family – Tearaway
- Game Design – Grand Theft Auto V
- Game Innovation – Brothers: A Tale of Two Sons
- Mobile & Handheld – Tearaway
- Online Multiplayer – Grand Theft Auto V
- Original Music – BioShock Infinite
- Performer – Ashley Johnson (as Ellie, The Last of Us)
- Sports – FIFA 14
- Story – The Last of Us
- Strategy & Simulation – Papers, Please
- BAFTA Ones to Watch Award – Size DOES Matter
- Academy Fellowship – Rockstar Games

=== 2014 ===
The 2014 ceremony took place at Tobacco Dock on 12 March 2015 and was hosted by Rufus Hound.

- Artistic Achievement – Lumino City
- Audio Achievement – Alien: Isolation
- Best Game – Destiny
- British Game – Monument Valley
- Debut Game – Never Alone
- Family – Minecraft: Console Editions
- Game Design – Middle-earth: Shadow of Mordor
- Game Innovation – The Vanishing of Ethan Carter
- Mobile & Handheld – Monument Valley
- Online Multiplayer – Hearthstone: Heroes of Warcraft
- Original Music – Far Cry 4
- Original Property – Valiant Hearts: The Great War
- Performer – Ashley Johnson (as Ellie, The Last of Us: Left Behind)
- Persistent Game – League of Legends
- Sports – OlliOlli
- Story – The Last of Us: Left Behind
- BAFTA Ones to Watch Award – Chambara
- Academy Fellowship – David Braben

=== 2015 ===
The 2015 ceremony took place at Tobacco Dock on 7 April 2016 and was hosted by Dara Ó Briain.

- Artistic Achievement – Ori and the Blind Forest
- Audio Achievement – Everybody's Gone to the Rapture
- Best Game – Fallout 4
- British Game – Batman: Arkham Knight
- Debut Game – Her Story
- Family – Rocket League
- Game Design – Bloodborne
- Game Innovation – Her Story
- Mobile & Handheld – Her Story
- Multiplayer – Rocket League
- Music - Everybody's Gone to the Rapture
- Original Property – Until Dawn
- Performer – Merle Dandridge (as Kate Collins, Everybody's Gone to the Rapture)
- Persistent Game – Prison Architect
- Sports – Rocket League
- Story – Life Is Strange
- Special - Amy Hennig
- BAFTA Ones to Watch Award – Sundown
- Academy Fellowship – John Carmack
- AMD eSports Audience Award – Smite

=== 2016 ===
The 2016 ceremony took place at Tobacco Dock on 6 April 2017 and was hosted by Danny Wallace.

- Artistic Achievement – Inside
- Audio Achievement – The Last Guardian
- Best Game – Uncharted 4: A Thief's End
- British Game – Overcooked
- Debut Game – Firewatch
- Evolving Game – Rocket League
- Family – Overcooked
- Game Design – Inside
- Game Innovation – That Dragon, Cancer
- Mobile – Pokémon Go
- Multiplayer – Overwatch
- Music – Virginia
- Narrative – Inside
- Original Property – Inside
- Performer – Cissy Jones (as Delilah, Firewatch)
- BAFTA Special Award – Brenda Romero
- BAFTA Special Award - Brandon Beck and Marc Merrill of Riot Games
- BAFTA Ones to Watch Award – Among the Stones
- AMD eSports Audience Award – Clash Royale

=== 2017 ===
The 2017 ceremony took place at The Troxy on 12 April 2018 and was hosted by Dara Ó Briain.

- Artistic Achievement – Hellblade: Senua's Sacrifice
- Audio Achievement – Hellblade: Senua's Sacrifice
- Best Game – What Remains of Edith Finch
- British Game – Hellblade: Senua's Sacrifice
- Debut Game – Gorogoa
- Evolving Game – Overwatch
- Family – Super Mario Odyssey
- Game Beyond Entertainment – Hellblade: Senua's Sacrifice
- Game Design – Super Mario Odyssey
- Game Innovation – The Legend of Zelda: Breath of the Wild
- Mobile Game – Golf Clash
- Multiplayer – Divinity: Original Sin II
- Music – Cuphead
- Narrative – Night in the Woods
- Original Property – Horizon Zero Dawn
- Performer – Melina Juergens (as Senua, Hellblade: Senua's Sacrifice)
- Special Award: Nolan North

=== 2018 ===
The 2018 ceremony took place at Queen Elizabeth Hall on 4 April 2019 and was hosted by Dara Ó Briain.

- Artistic Achievement – Return of the Obra Dinn
- Audio Achievement – God of War
- Best Game – God of War
- British Game – Forza Horizon 4
- Debut Game – Yoku's Island Express
- EE Mobile Game – Old School RuneScape
- Evolving Game – Fortnite Battle Royale
- Family – Nintendo Labo
- Game Beyond Entertainment – My Child Lebensborn
- Game Design – Return of the Obra Dinn
- Game Innovation – Nintendo Labo
- Mobile Game – Florence
- Multiplayer – A Way Out
- Music – God of War
- Narrative – God of War
- Original Property – Into the Breach
- Performer – Jeremy Davies as The Stranger/Baldur in God of War
- Special Award – Epic Games

=== 2019 ===
Though originally planned to be presented at a ceremony at the Queen Elizabeth Hall in London, the event was instead presented as a live stream on 2 April 2020 due to concern over the COVID-19 pandemic.

- Animation – Luigi's Mansion 3
- Artistic Achievement – Sayonara Wild Hearts
- Audio Achievement – Ape Out
- Best Game – Outer Wilds
- British Game – Observation
- Debut Game – Disco Elysium
- EE Mobile Game – Call of Duty: Mobile
- Evolving Game – Path of Exile
- Family – Untitled Goose Game
- Game Beyond Entertainment – Kind Words (lo fi chill beats to write to)
- Game Design – Outer Wilds
- Multiplayer – Apex Legends
- Music – Disco Elysium
- Narrative – Disco Elysium
- Original Property – Disco Elysium
- Performer in a Leading Role – Gonzalo Martin as Sean Diaz in Life Is Strange 2
- Performer in a Supporting Role – Martti Suosalo as Ahti the Janitor in Control
- Technical Achievement – Death Stranding
- BAFTA Fellowship – Hideo Kojima

=== 2020 ===
The event was held as a live-streamed event on 25 March 2021. The nominees were announced on 3 March 2021.

- Animation – The Last of Us Part II
- Artistic Achievement – Hades
- Audio Achievement – Ghost of Tsushima
- Best Game – Hades
- British Game – Sackboy: A Big Adventure
- Debut Game – Carrion
- EE Game of the Year – The Last of Us Part II
- Evolving Game – Sea of Thieves
- Family – Sackboy: A Big Adventure
- Game Beyond Entertainment – Animal Crossing: New Horizons
- Game Design – Hades
- Multiplayer – Animal Crossing: New Horizons
- Music – Spider-Man: Miles Morales
- Narrative – Hades
- Original Property – Kentucky Route Zero: TV Edition
- Performer in a Leading Role – Laura Bailey as Abby in The Last of Us Part II
- Performer in a Supporting Role – Logan Cunningham for multiple roles in Hades
- Technical Achievement – Dreams
- BAFTA Fellowship – Siobhan Reddy

=== 2021 ===
The ceremony took place at Queen Elizabeth Hall on 7 April 2022 and was hosted by television presenter Elle Osili-Wood for the second time. The nominees were announced on 3 March 2022.

- Animation – Ratchet & Clank: Rift Apart
- Artistic Achievement – The Artful Escape
- Audio Achievement – Returnal
- Best Game – Returnal
- British Game – Forza Horizon 5
- Debut Game – TOEM
- EE Game of the Year – Unpacking
- Evolving Game – No Man's Sky
- Family – Chicory: A Colorful Tale
- Game Beyond Entertainment – Before Your Eyes
- Game Design – Inscryption
- Multiplayer – It Takes Two
- Music – Returnal
- Narrative – Unpacking
- Original Property – It Takes Two
- Performer in a Leading Role – Jane Perry as Selene Vassos in Returnal
- Performer in a Supporting Role – Kimberly Brooks as Hollis Forsythe in Psychonauts 2
- Technical Achievement – Ratchet & Clank: Rift Apart

=== 2022 ===
The ceremony took place at Queen Elizabeth Hall on 30 March 2023 and was hosted by esports presenter Frankie Ward. The nominees were announced on 2 March 2023.

- Animation – God of War Ragnarök
- Artistic Achievement – Tunic
- Audio Achievement – God of War Ragnarök
- Best Game – Vampire Survivors
- British Game – Rollerdrome
- Debut Game – Tunic
- EE Game of the Year – God of War Ragnarök
- Evolving Game – Final Fantasy XIV Online
- Family – Kirby and the Forgotten Land
- Game Beyond Entertainment – Endling: Extinction is Forever
- Game Design – Vampire Survivors
- Multiplayer – Elden Ring
- Music – God of War Ragnarök
- Narrative – Immortality
- Original Property – Elden Ring
- Performer in a Leading Role – Christopher Judge as Kratos in God of War Ragnarök
- Performer in a Supporting Role – Laya Deleon Hayes as Angrboða in God of War Ragnarök
- Technical Achievement – Horizon Forbidden West

=== 2023 ===
The ceremony took place at Queen Elizabeth Hall on 11 April 2024. For the first time, BAFTA released their official longlist on 14 December 2023, with the shortlisted nominees announced on 7 March 2024.

- Animation – Hi-Fi Rush
- Artistic Achievement – Alan Wake 2
- Audio Achievement – Alan Wake 2
- Best Game – Baldur's Gate 3
- British Game – Viewfinder
- Debut Game – Venba
- EE Game of the Year – Baldur's Gate 3
- Evolving Game – Cyberpunk 2077
- Family – Super Mario Bros. Wonder
- Game Beyond Entertainment – Tchia
- Game Design – Dave the Diver
- Multiplayer – Super Mario Bros. Wonder
- Music – Baldur's Gate 3
- Narrative – Baldur's Gate 3
- New Intellectual Property – Viewfinder
- Performer in a Leading Role – Nadji Jeter as Miles Morales in Marvel's Spider-Man 2
- Performer in a Supporting Role – Andrew Wincott as Raphael in Baldur's Gate 3
- Technical Achievement – The Legend of Zelda: Tears of the Kingdom

=== 2024 ===
The ceremony took place at Queen Elizabeth Hall on 8 April 2025.

- Animation – Astro Bot
- Artistic Achievement – Neva
- Audio Achievement – Astro Bot
- Best Game – Astro Bot
- British Game – Thank Goodness You're Here!
- Debut Game – Balatro
- Evolving Game – Vampire Survivors
- Family – Astro Bot
- Game Beyond Entertainment – Tales of Kenzera: Zau
- Game Design – Astro Bot
- Multiplayer – Helldivers 2
- Music – Helldivers 2
- Narrative – Metaphor: ReFantazio
- New Intellectual Property – Still Wakes the Deep
- Performer in a Leading Role – Alec Newman as Cameron "Caz" McLeary in Still Wakes the Deep
- Performer in a Supporting Role – Karen Dunbar as Finlay in Still Wakes the Deep
- Technical Achievement – Senua's Saga: Hellblade II

=== 2025 ===
The ceremony took place at Queen Elizabeth Hall on 17 April 2026.

- Animation – Dispatch
- Artistic Achievement – Death Stranding 2: On the Beach
- Audio Achievement – Dispatch
- Best Game – Clair Obscur: Expedition 33
- British Game – Atomfall
- Debut Game – Clair Obscur: Expedition 33
- Evolving Game – No Man's Sky
- Family – Lego Party
- Game Beyond Entertainment – Despelote
- Game Design – Blue Prince
- Multiplayer – ARC Raiders
- Music – Ghost of Yōtei
- Narrative – Kingdom Come: Deliverance II
- New Intellectual Property – South of Midnight
- Performer in a Leading Role – Jennifer English as Maelle in Clair Obscur: Expedition 33
- Performer in a Supporting Role – Jeffrey Wright as Chase in Dispatch
- Technical Achievement – Ghost of Yōtei

== See also ==
- British Academy of Film and Television Arts
