= 5th British Academy Games Awards =

Game award ceremony in 2009

- Date: 10 March 2009
- Location: London Hilton
- Hosted by: Dara Ó Briain
- Best Game: Super Mario Galaxy
- Most awards: Call of Duty 4: Modern Warfare (3)
- Most nominations: Call of Duty 4: Modern Warfare & Grand Theft Auto IV (7)

The 5th British Academy Video Game Awards (known for the purposes of sponsorship as GAME British Academy Video Games Awards) awarded by British Academy of Film and Television Arts (BAFTA), was an award ceremony honouring achievement in the field of video games in 2008. Candidate games must have been released in the United Kingdom between 26 October 2007 and 31 December 2008. The ceremony took place in the London Hilton on 10 March 2009. Call of Duty 4: Modern Warfare & Grand Theft Auto IV led with the most nominations with seven, Call of Duty 4: Modern Warfare was the major winner, taking three of the seven awards available.

== Timeline ==
All entries (from either a game's publisher or developer) received before 5 November 2008, were voted on by a first stage panel after grouping into categories by BAFTA. The six games with the most votes in each category move on to a second stage where they are scrutinised by a jury of between seven and nine from December 2008 until January 2009, picked especially for each category. Once the jury has played all the games in a category, a vote by secret ballot decides the winners; the votes were counted by Deloitte LLP.

== Nominations ==
Nominations were announced on 10 February 2009. Along with Call of Duty 4, leading the field on seven nominations was Grand Theft Auto IV, just behind with six nominations was LittleBigPlanet. Despite garnering the joint most nominations, Grand Theft Auto IV would fail to capture any of the awards. LittleBigPlanet similarly failed to live up to the number of nominations by scooping only one gong despite its six nominations.

== Categories ==
Both publishers and developers were eligible to enter their games in fifteen categories, fourteen of which were awarded by a panel of judges. The categories were: Gameplay, Casual, Sports, Story and Character, Strategy, Use of Audio, Multiplayer, Technical Achievement, Original Score, Handheld, People's Choice (the only award voted for by the public), Artistic Achievement, Best Action and Adventure and Best Game. There was surprise in the announcement of Super Mario Galaxy as the winner of the main award of Game of the Year, as well as the fact that Grand Theft Auto IV did not receive any of the prizes, despite leading the nominations list. Grand Theft Auto IV failed to win an award after receiving six nominations, replicating the "feat" managed by Gears of War at the preceding ceremony.

== Winners and nominees ==
Winners are shown first in bold.

**Action and Adventure**: **Fable II – Lionhead Studios/Microsoft Game Studios**; Call of Duty 4: Modern Warfare – Infinity Ward/Activision; Dead Space – Visceral Games/Electronic Arts; Grand Theft Auto IV – Rockstar North/Rockstar Games; Prince of Persia – Ubisoft Montreal/Ubisoft; Tomb Raider: Underworld – Crystal Dynamics/Eidos Interactive	**Sports**: **Race Driver: Grid – Codemasters/Codemasters**; FIFA 09 – EA Canada/EA Sports; Football Manager 2009 – Sports Interactive/Sega; MotorStorm: Pacific Rift – Evolution Studios/Sony Computer Entertainment; Pure – Black Rock Studio/Disney Interactive Studios; Wii Fit – Nintendo EAD Group No. 5/Nintendo
**Artistic Achievement**: **LittleBigPlanet – Media Molecule**; Assassin's Creed – Ubisoft Montreal/Ubisoft; Call of Duty 4: Modern Warfare – Infinity Ward/Activision; Dead Space – Visceral Games/Electronic Arts; Gears of War 2 – Epic Games/Microsoft Game Studios; Metal Gear Solid 4: Guns of the Patriots – Konami/Konami	**Strategy**: **Civilization Revolution – Firaxis Games/2K Games**; Advance Wars: Dark Conflict – Intelligent Systems/Nintendo; Command & Conquer: Red Alert 3 – EA Los Angeles/Electronic Arts; Ninjatown – Venan Entertainment/SouthPeak Games; SOCOM U.S. Navy SEALs: Tactical Strike – Slant Six Games/Sony Computer Entertainment; Viva Piñata: Pocket Paradise – Rare/THQ
**Best Game**: **Super Mario Galaxy – Nintendo EAD Tokyo/Nintendo**; Call of Duty 4: Modern Warfare – Infinity Ward/Activision; Fable II – Lionhead Studios/Microsoft Game Studios; Fallout 3 – Bethesda Game Studios/Bethesda Softworks; Grand Theft Auto IV – Rockstar North/Rockstar Games; Rock Band – Harmonix/MTV Games and Electronic Arts	**Story and Character**: **Call of Duty 4: Modern Warfare – Jesse Stern, Infinity Ward/Activision**; Assassin's Creed – Corey May, Ubisoft Montreal/Ubisoft; Fable II – Peter Molyneux, Lionhead Studios/Microsoft Game Studios; Fallout 3 – Emil Pagliarulo, Bethesda Game Studios/Bethesda Softworks; Grand Theft Auto IV – Dan Houser, Rupert Humphries, Rockstar North/Rockstar Games; Mass Effect – Drew Karpyshyn, BioWare/Microsoft Game Studios
**Casual**: **Boom Blox – EA Los Angeles and Amblin Interactive/Electronic Arts**; Buzz!: Quiz TV – Relentless Software/Sony Computer Entertainment Europe; Guitar Hero World Tour – Neversoft/Activision; LittleBigPlanet – Media Molecule/Sony Computer Entertainment; SingStar Vol. 2 – London Studio/Sony Computer Entertainment; Wii Fit – Nintendo EAD Group No. 5/Nintendo	**Technical Achievement**: **Spore – Maxis/Electronic Arts**; Assassin's Creed – Ubisoft Montreal/Ubisoft; Fable II – Lionhead Studios/Microsoft Game Studios; Fallout 3 – Bethesda Game Studios/Bethesda Softworks; Grand Theft Auto IV – Rockstar North/Rockstar Games; LittleBigPlanet – Media Molecule/Sony Computer Entertainment
**Gameplay**: **Call of Duty 4: Modern Warfare – Infinity Ward/Activision**; Grand Theft Auto IV – Rockstar North/Rockstar Games; Left 4 Dead – Valve/Valve; Mario Kart Wii – Nintendo EAD/Nintendo; Rock Band – Harmonix/MTV Games and Electronic Arts; Super Mario Galaxy – Nintendo EAD Tokyo/Nintendo	**Use of Audio**: **Dead Space – Visceral Games/Electronic Arts**; Call of Duty 4: Modern Warfare – Infinity Ward/Activision; Gears of War 2 – Epic Games/Microsoft Game Studios; Grand Theft Auto IV – Rockstar North/Rockstar Games; LittleBigPlanet – Media Molecule/Sony Computer Entertainment; Super Mario Galaxy – Nintendo EAD Tokyo/Nintendo
**Handheld**: **Professor Layton and the Curious Village – Level-5/Nintendo**; Geometry Wars: Galaxies – Bizarre Creations and Kuju Entertainment/Sierra Entertainment; God of War: Chains of Olympus – Ready at Dawn and Santa Monica Studio/Sony Computer Entertainment; The Legend of Zelda: Phantom Hourglass – Nintendo EAD/Nintendo; Patapon – Pyramid and Japan Studio/Sony Computer Entertainment; Soul Bubbles – Mekensleep	**BAFTA One's to Watch Award (in association with Dare to Be Digital)**: **Boro Toro – DarkMatter Designs**; Origamee; Vegeme
**Multiplayer**: **Left 4 Dead – Valve/Valve**; Buzz! Quiz TV – Relentless Software/Sony Computer Entertainment Europe; Call of Duty 4: Modern Warfare – Infinity Ward/Activision; Gears of War 2 – Epic Games/Microsoft Game Studios; Mario Kart Wii – Nintendo EAD/Nintendo; Rock Band – Harmonix/MTV Games and Electronic Arts	**GAME Award of 2008**: **Call of Duty 4: Modern Warfare – Infinity Ward/Activision**; Fallout 3 – Bethesda Game Studios/Bethesda Softworks; Gears of War 2 – Epic Games/Microsoft Game Studios; Grand Theft Auto IV – Rockstar North/Rockstar Games; Guitar Hero World Tour – Neversoft/Activision; Left 4 Dead – Valve/Valve; LittleBigPlanet – Media Molecule/Sony Computer Entertainment; Professor Layton and the Curious Village – Level-5/Nintendo; Wii Fit – Nintendo EAD Group No. 5/Nintendo; World of Warcraft: Wrath of the Lich King – Blizzard Entertainment/Blizzard Entertainment
**Original Score**: **Dead Space – Jason Graves, Visceral Games/Electronic Arts**; Assassin's Creed – Jesper Kyd, Ubisoft Montreal/Ubisoft; Fable II – Danny Elfman, Russell Shaw, Lionhead Studios/Microsoft Game Studios; Fallout 3 – Inon Zur, Bethesda Game Studios/Bethesda Softworks; LittleBigPlanet – Kenneth C M Young, Mat Clark, Daniel Pemberton, Media Molecule/Sony Computer Entertainment; Metal Gear Solid 4: Guns of the Patriots – Harry Gregson-Williams, Nobuko Toda, Shuichi Kobori, Kazuma Jinnouchi, Konami/Konami

=== Academy Fellowship ===
- **Nolan Bushnell**

=== Games with multiple nominations and wins ===
==== Nominations ====
Nominations	Game
7	Call of Duty 4: Modern Warfare
7	Grand Theft Auto IV
6	LittleBigPlanet
5	Fable II
5	Fallout 3
4	Assassin's Creed
4	Dead Space
4	Gears of War 2
3	Left 4 Dead
3	Rock Band
3	Super Mario Galaxy
3	Wii Fit
2	Buzz! Quiz TV
2	Guitar Hero: World Tour
2	Mario Kart Wii
2	Metal Gear Solid 4: Guns of the Patriots
2	Professor Layton and the Curious Village

==== Wins ====
Awards	Game
3
3	Call of Duty 4: Modern Warfare
2
2	Dead Space
