= EE Game of the Year Award =

Video game award

EE Game of the Year
- Country: United Kingdom
- Presented by: British Academy of Film and Television Arts
- First award: 2018
- Currently held by: Baldur's Gate 3
- Website: www.bafta.org/games

The British Academy of Film and Television Arts (BAFTA) EE Game of the Year, formerly EE Mobile Game of the Year, is an audience voted award presented annually at the British Academy Games Awards honouring "the best game of the year, as voted for by the public". The award is sponsored by the telecommunications company EE and winners receive a special solid yellow BAFTA statuette as opposed to the standard golden statuettes given to the recipients of other categories.

It was first presented to Old School RuneScape at the 15th British Academy Games Awards in 2018 as a fan-voted companion to the British Academy Games Award for Mobile Game, but was expanded and renamed at the 17th British Academy Games Awards in 2021 to include games on any platform. Nintendo are the most nominated developer, with three, and are also have the most nominations without a win. Among publishers, Sony Interactive Entertainment lead with four nominations, and are the only publisher to have two wins in the category. Nintendo and The Pokémon Company both have two nominations and are yet to win.

The current holder of the award is Baldur's Gate 3 by Larian Studios, which it won at the 20th British Academy Games Awards in 2024.

== Winners and nominees ==
In the following table, the years are listed as per BAFTA convention, and generally correspond to the year of game release in the United Kingdom, with the ceremony generally being held the year after.

Table key
Indicates the winner

EE Mobile Game of the Year

Year	Game	Developer(s)	Publisher(s)	Ref.
2018 (15th)	Old School RuneScape	Jagex		
2018 (15th)	Brawl Stars	Supercell		
2018 (15th)	Clash Royale	Supercell		
2018 (15th)	Fortnite	Epic Games		
2018 (15th)	Pokémon Go	Niantic		
2018 (15th)	Roblox	Roblox Corporation		
2019 (16th)	Call of Duty: Mobile	TiMi Studios	Activision/Tencent Games	
2019 (16th)	Assemble with Care	Ustwo		
2019 (16th)	Dead Man's Phone	Electric Noir Studios		
2019 (16th)	Pokémon Go	Niantic		
2019 (16th)	Tangle Tower	SFB Games		
2019 (16th)	What the Golf?	Triband		

EE Game of the Year

Year	Game	Developer(s)	Publisher(s)	Ref.
2020 (17th)	The Last of Us Part II	Naughty Dog	Sony Interactive Entertainment	
2020 (17th)	Animal Crossing: New Horizons	Nintendo EPD	Nintendo	
2020 (17th)	Call of Duty: Warzone	Raven Software	Activision	
2020 (17th)	Ghost of Tsushima	Sucker Punch Productions	Sony Interactive Entertainment	
2020 (17th)	Hades	Supergiant Games		
2020 (17th)	Valorant	Riot Games		
2021 (18th)	Unpacking	Witch Beam	Humble Bundle	
2021 (18th)	Chicory: A Colorful Tale	Greg Lobanov	Finji	
2021 (18th)	Deathloop	Arkane Studios	Bethesda Softworks	
2021 (18th)	The Forgotten City	Modern Storyteller	Dear Villagers	
2021 (18th)	It Takes Two	Hazelight Studios	Electronic Arts	
2021 (18th)	Metroid Dread	MercurySteam	Nintendo	
2022 (19th)	God of War Ragnarök	Santa Monica Studio	Sony Interactive Entertainment	
2022 (19th)	Elden Ring	FromSoftware	FromSoftware/Bandai Namco Entertainment	
2022 (19th)	Horizon Forbidden West	Guerrilla Games	Sony Interactive Entertainment	
2022 (19th)	Immortality	Half Mermaid Productions		
2022 (19th)	Marvel Snap	Second Dinner	Nuverse	
2022 (19th)	Stray	BlueTwelve	Annapurna Interactive	
2023 (20th)	Baldur's Gate 3	Larian Studios		
2023 (20th)	Cyberpunk 2077	CD Projekt RED		
2023 (20th)	Fortnite	Epic Games		
2023 (20th)	The Legend of Zelda: Tears of the Kingdom	Nintendo		
2023 (20th)	Lethal Company	Zeekerss		
2023 (20th)	Marvel's Spider-Man 2	Insomniac Games	Sony Interactive Entertainment	

== Multiple nominations and wins ==
=== Developers ===
Developer	Nominations	Wins
Nintendo EPD	3	0
Niantic	2	0

=== Publishers ===
Developer	Nominations	Wins
Sony Interactive Entertainment	4	2
Activision	2	1
Nintendo	2	0
The Pokémon Company	2	0
