= 4th British Academy Games Awards =

Game award ceremony in 2007

- Date: 23 October 2007
- Location: Battersea Evolution
- Hosted by: Vic Reeves
- Best Game: BioShock
- Most awards: Wii Sports (6)
- Most nominations: Wii Sports (7)

The 4th British Academy Video Games Awards (known for the purposes of sponsorship as British Academy Video Games Awards in Association with PC World), awarded by the British Academy of Film and Television Arts, was an award ceremony held on 23 October 2007 in Battersea Evolution. The ceremony honoured achievement in 2007 for games which were released between 6 October 2006 and 5 October 2007 and was hosted by Vic Reeves. Wii Sports led with the most nominations with seven. Wii Sports was the major winner on the night, taking six of the seven awards available, equaling the record Grand Theft Auto: Vice City (2003) and Half-Life 2 (2004) had with the most awards won in any BAFTA Video Games Awards ceremony. BioShock took the main prize of Best Game.

== Winners and nominees ==
Winners are shown first in bold.

| **Action and Adventure (Sponsored by PC World)**: **Crackdown – Realtime Worlds/Microsoft Game Studios**; Gears of War – Epic Games/Microsoft Game Studios; God of War II – Santa Monica Studio/Sony Computer Entertainment; The Orange Box – Valve/Valve; Ratchet & Clank: Tools of Destruction – Insomniac Games/Sony Computer Entertainment; The Legend of Zelda: Twilight Princess – Nintendo EAD/Nintendo | **Sports**: **Wii Sports – Nintendo EAD/Nintendo**; Colin McRae: Dirt – Codemasters/Codemasters; Football Manager 2008 – Sports Interactive/Sega; FIFA 08 – EA Canada/EA Sports; MotorStorm – Evolution Studios/Sony Computer Entertainment; Virtua Tennis 3 – Sega and Sumo Digital/Sega |
| **Artistic Achievement**: **Ōkami – Clover Studio/Capcom**; BioShock – 2K Boston and 2K Australia/2K Games; Heavenly Sword – Ninja Theory/Sony Computer Entertainment; Ratchet & Clank: Tools of Destruction – Insomniac Games/Sony Computer Entertainment; Skate – EA Black Box/Electronic Arts; Viva Piñata – Rare/Microsoft Game Studios | **Story and Character**: **God of War II – Cory Barlog, James Barlog and Marianne Krawczyk, Santa Monica Studio/Sony Computer Entertainment**; Final Fantasy XII – Daisuke Watanabe, Miwa Shoda and Yasumi Matsuno, Square Enix/Square Enix; Heavenly Sword – Tameem Antoniades, Rhianna Pratchett and Andrew S. Walsh, Ninja Theory/Sony Computer Entertainment; Ōkami – Hideki Kamiya, Clover Studio/Capcom; The Darkness – Starbreeze Studios/2K Games; The Simpsons Game – EA Redwood Shores/Electronic Arts |
| **Best Game**: **BioShock – 2K Boston and 2K Australia/2K Games**; Crysis – Crytek/Electronic Arts; Gears of War – Epic Games/Microsoft Game Studios; Guitar Hero II – Harmonix/Activision; Kane & Lynch: Dead Men – IO Interactive/Eidos Interactive; Wii Sports – Nintendo EAD/Nintendo | **Strategy and Simulation**: **Wii Sports – Nintendo EAD/Nintendo**; Command & Conquer 3: Tiberium Wars – EA Los Angeles/Electronic Arts; Forza Motorsport 2 – Turn 10 Studios/Microsoft Game Studios; Medieval II: Total War: Kingdoms – Creative Assembly/Sega; Tom Clancy's Rainbow Six: Vegas – Ubisoft Montreal/Ubisoft; World in Conflict – Massive Entertainment/Sierra Entertainment |
| **Casual**: **Wii Sports – Nintendo EAD/Nintendo**; Big Brain Academy for Wii – Nintendo Entertainment Analysis & Development Group No. 4/Nintendo; Cake Mania – Sandlot Games/Sandlot Games; Guitar Hero II – Harmonix/Activision; More Brain Training – Nintendo SPD/Nintendo; SingStar – London Studio/Sony Computer Entertainment | **Technical Achievement**: **God of War II – Santa Monica Studio/Sony Computer Entertainment**; Crackdown – Realtime Worlds/Microsoft Game Studios; Gears of War – Epic Games/Microsoft Game Studios; MotorStorm – Evolution Studios/Sony Computer Entertainment; Ōkami – Clover Studio/Capcom; Uncharted: Drake's Fortune – Naughty Dog/Sony Computer Entertainment |
| **Gameplay (sponsored by Nokia N-Gage)**: **Wii Sports – Nintendo EAD/Nintendo**; Crackdown – Realtime Worlds/Microsoft Game Studios; Gears of War – Epic Games/Microsoft Game Studios; Sega Rally – Sega Racing Studio/Sega; The Legend of Zelda: Twilight Princess – Nintendo EAD/Nintendo; Warhawk – Incognito Entertainment and Santa Monica Studio/Sony Computer Entertainment | **Use of Audio**: **Crackdown – Realtime Worlds/Microsoft Game Studios**; Elite Beat Agents – iNiS/Nintendo; Gears of War – Epic Games/Microsoft Game Studios; God of War II – Santa Monica Studio/Sony Computer Entertainment; Guitar Hero II – Harmonix/Activision; Skate – EA Black Box/Electronic Arts |
| **Innovation**: **Wii Sports – Nintendo EAD/Nintendo**; flOw – thatgamecompany/Sony Computer Entertainment; Ōkami – Clover Studio/Capcom; Super Paper Mario – Intelligent Systems and Nintendo SPD/Nintendo; The Eye of Judgment – Japan Studio/Sony Computer Entertainment; Trauma Center: Second Opinion – Atlus/Atlus | **BAFTA One's to Watch Award (in association with Dare to Be Digital)**: **Ragnarawk – Voodoo Boogy**; Bear Go Home – Phoenix Seed; Climbatic |
| **Multiplayer**: **Wii Sports – Nintendo EAD/Nintendo**; Battlefield 2142 – EA DICE/Electronic Arts; Crackdown – Realtime Worlds/Microsoft Game Studios; Guitar Hero II – Harmonix/Activision; World in Conflict – Massive Entertainment/Sierra Entertainment; World of Warcraft: The Burning Crusade – Blizzard Entertainment/Blizzard Entertainment | **The PC World Gamers Award (the only award to be voted for by the public)**: **Football Manager 2007 – Sports Interactive/Sega**; Dr. Kawashima's Brain Training – Nintendo SPD/Nintendo; FIFA 07 – EA Canada/Electronic Arts; Gears of War – Epic Games/Microsoft Game Studios; Grand Theft Auto: Vice City Stories – Rockstar Leeds and Rockstar North/Rockstar Games; Resistance: Fall of Man – Insomniac Games/Sony Computer Entertainment; Wii Play – Nintendo EAD Group No. 2/Nintendo |
**Original Score**: **Ōkami – Masami Ueda, Hiroshi Yamaguchi, Rei Kondoh and Akari Groves, Clover Studio/Capcom**; Final Fantasy XII – Hitoshi Sakimoto, Hayato Matsuo and Masaharu Iwata, Square Enix/Square Enix; God of War II – Gerard Marino, Ron Fish, Mike Reagan and Cris Velasco, Santa Monica Studio/Sony Computer Entertainment; Lair – John Debney, Factor 5/Sony Computer Entertainment; The Legend of Zelda: Twilight Princess – Toru Minegishi, Asuka Ohta, Nintendo EAD/Nintendo; Viva Piñata – Grant Kirkhope, Rare/Microsoft Game Studios

=== Academy Fellowship ===
- **Will Wright**

=== Games with multiple nominations and wins ===
==== Nominations ====
| Nominations | Game |
|---|---|
| 7 | Wii Sports |
| 6 | Gears of War |
| 5 | Crackdown |
| 5 | God of War II |
| 5 | Ōkami |
| 4 | Guitar Hero II |
| 3 | The Legend of Zelda: Twilight Princess |
| 2 | BioShock |
| 2 | Final Fantasy XII |
| 2 | Heavenly Sword |
| 2 | MotorStorm |
| 2 | Ratchet & Clank: Tools of Destruction |
| 2 | Skate |
| 2 | World in Conflict |

==== Wins ====
| Awards | Game |
|---|---|
| 6 | Wii Sports |
| 2 | Crackdown |
| 2 | God of War II |
| 2 | Ōkami |

- Two separate franchises (the FIFA and Football Manager series) garnered more than one nomination (with one each for FIFA 07, FIFA 08 Football Manager 2007 (winner of PC World Gamers Award) and Football Manager 2008).
