= British Academy Games Award for Best Game =

Video game award

British Academy Video Games Award for Best Game
- Country: United Kingdom
- Presented by: British Academy of Film and Television Arts
- First award: 2004
- Currently held by: Clair Obscur: Expedition 33
- Website: www.bafta.org/awards/games/

The British Academy Video Games Award for Best Game is an award presented annually at the British Academy Games Awards. The British Academy of Film and Television Arts (BAFTA) is honouring "the best game of the year, across all genres and platforms". The 1st British Academy Video Games Awards ceremony was held in 2004, with Infinity Ward and Activision's game Call of Duty receiving the award. The award was originally known as Game of the Year – The Year's Best Game for the 2004 ceremony.

Since its inception, the award has been given to 21 games. As developers, Valve and Naughty Dog have received the most awards in this category, with two wins, while Sony Interactive Entertainment are the most awarded publishers in this category, with five wins. Nintendo's Entertainment Analysis & Development division were nominated on six occasions, more than any other developer; and Sony are the most nominated publisher, with sixteen nominations.

The most recent winner of the award is Clair Obscur: Expedition 33 by Sandfall Interactive, published by Kepler Interactive which received it at the 22nd British Academy Games Awards.

== Winners and nominees ==
In the following table, the years are listed as per BAFTA convention, and generally correspond to the year of game release in the United Kingdom.

Table key
| Indicates the winner |

| Year | Game | Developer(s) | Publisher(s) | Ref. |
|---|---|---|---|---|
| 2002/03 (1st) | Call of Duty | Infinity Ward | Activision | |
| 2003/04 (2nd) | Half-Life 2 | Valve | | |
| 2003/04 (2nd) | FIFA Football 2005 | EA Canada | Electronic Arts | |
| 2003/04 (2nd) | Football Manager 2005 | Sports Interactive | Sega | |
| 2003/04 (2nd) | Grand Theft Auto: San Andreas | Rockstar North | Rockstar Games | |
| 2003/04 (2nd) | Halo 2 | Bungie | Microsoft Game Studios | |
| 2003/04 (2nd) | Pro Evolution Soccer 4 | Konami Computer Entertainment Tokyo | Konami | |
| 2005/06 (3rd) | Tom Clancy's Ghost Recon Advanced Warfighter | Ubisoft Paris, Red Storm Entertainment, Ubisoft Shanghai, Darkworks, Grin | Ubisoft | |
| 2005/06 (3rd) | Black | Criterion Games | Electronic Arts | |
| 2005/06 (3rd) | Dr. Kawashima's Brain Training: How Old Is Your Brain? | Nintendo SPD | Nintendo | |
| 2005/06 (3rd) | Guitar Hero | Harmonix | RedOctane | |
| 2005/06 (3rd) | Hitman: Blood Money | IO Interactive | Eidos Interactive | |
| 2005/06 (3rd) | Lego Star Wars II: The Original Trilogy | Traveller's Tales | LucasArts | |
| 2006/07 (4th) | BioShock | 2K Boston, 2K Australia | 2K Games | |
| 2006/07 (4th) | Crysis | Crytek | Electronic Arts | |
| 2006/07 (4th) | Gears of War | Epic Games | Microsoft Game Studios | |
| 2006/07 (4th) | Guitar Hero II | Harmonix | Activision | |
| 2006/07 (4th) | Kane & Lynch: Dead Men | IO Interactive | Eidos Interactive | |
| 2006/07 (4th) | Wii Sports | Nintendo EAD | Nintendo | |
| 2007/08 (5th) | Super Mario Galaxy | Nintendo EAD Tokyo | Nintendo | |
| 2007/08 (5th) | Call of Duty 4: Modern Warfare | Infinity Ward | Activision | |
| 2007/08 (5th) | Fallout 3 | Bethesda Game Studios | Bethesda Softworks | |
| 2007/08 (5th) | Fable II | Lionhead Studios | Microsoft Game Studios | |
| 2007/08 (5th) | Grand Theft Auto IV | Rockstar North | Rockstar Games | |
| 2007/08 (5th) | Rock Band | Harmonix, Pi Studios | MTV Games, Electronic Arts | |
| 2009 (6th) | Batman: Arkham Asylum | Rocksteady Studios | Eidos Interactive, Warner Bros. Interactive Entertainment | |
| 2009 (6th) | Assassin's Creed II | Ubisoft Montreal | Ubisoft | |
| 2009 (6th) | Call of Duty: Modern Warfare 2 | Infinity Ward | Activision | |
| 2009 (6th) | FIFA 10 | EA Canada, HB Studios, Sumo Digital, Exient Entertainment | Electronic Arts | |
| 2009 (6th) | Left 4 Dead 2 | Valve | | |
| 2009 (6th) | Uncharted 2: Among Thieves | Naughty Dog | Sony Computer Entertainment | |
| 2010 (7th) | Mass Effect 2 | BioWare | Electronic Arts, Microsoft Game Studios | |
| 2010 (7th) | Assassin's Creed: Brotherhood | Ubisoft Montreal | Ubisoft | |
| 2010 (7th) | FIFA 11 | EA Canada, HB Studios, Exient Entertainment | Electronic Arts | |
| 2010 (7th) | Heavy Rain | Quantic Dream | Sony Computer Entertainment | |
| 2010 (7th) | Limbo | Playdead | Microsoft Game Studios | |
| 2010 (7th) | Super Mario Galaxy 2 | Nintendo EAD Tokyo | Nintendo | |
| 2011 (8th) | Portal 2 | Valve | | |
| 2011 (8th) | Batman: Arkham City | Rocksteady Studios | Warner Bros. Interactive Entertainment | |
| 2011 (8th) | FIFA 12 | EA Canada | Electronic Arts | |
| 2011 (8th) | L.A. Noire | Team Bondi | Rockstar Games | |
| 2011 (8th) | The Elder Scrolls V: Skyrim | Bethesda Game Studios | Bethesda Softworks | |
| 2011 (8th) | The Legend of Zelda: Skyward Sword | Nintendo EAD | Nintendo | |
| 2012 (9th) | Dishonored | Arkane Studios | Bethesda Softworks | |
| 2012 (9th) | Far Cry 3 | Ubisoft Montreal | Ubisoft | |
| 2012 (9th) | FIFA 13 | EA Canada | Electronic Arts | |
| 2012 (9th) | Journey | Thatgamecompany, Santa Monica Studio | Sony Computer Entertainment | |
| 2012 (9th) | Mass Effect 3 | BioWare, Straight Right | Electronic Arts | |
| 2012 (9th) | The Walking Dead | Telltale Games | | |
| 2013 (10th) | The Last of Us | Naughty Dog | Sony Computer Entertainment | |
| 2013 (10th) | Assassin's Creed IV: Black Flag | Ubisoft Montreal | Ubisoft | |
| 2013 (10th) | Grand Theft Auto V | Rockstar North | Rockstar Games | |
| 2013 (10th) | Papers, Please | 3909 | | |
| 2013 (10th) | Super Mario 3D World | Nintendo EAD Tokyo, 1-Up Studio | Nintendo | |
| 2013 (10th) | Tearaway | Media Molecule | Sony Computer Entertainment | |
| 2014 (11th) | Destiny | Bungie | Activision | |
| 2014 (11th) | Alien: Isolation | The Creative Assembly | Sega | |
| 2014 (11th) | Dragon Age: Inquisition | BioWare | Electronic Arts | |
| 2014 (11th) | Mario Kart 8 | Nintendo EAD | Nintendo | |
| 2014 (11th) | Middle-earth: Shadow of Mordor | Monolith Productions | Warner Bros. Interactive Entertainment | |
| 2014 (11th) | Monument Valley | ustwo Games | ustwo Studio | |
| 2015 (12th) | Fallout 4 | Bethesda Game Studios | Bethesda Softworks | |
| 2015 (12th) | Everybody's Gone to the Rapture | The Chinese Room, Santa Monica Studio | Sony Computer Entertainment | |
| 2015 (12th) | Life Is Strange | Dontnod Entertainment | Square Enix | |
| 2015 (12th) | Metal Gear Solid V: The Phantom Pain | Kojima Productions | Konami | |
| 2015 (12th) | Rocket League | Psyonix | | |
| 2015 (12th) | The Witcher 3: Wild Hunt | CD Projekt Red | CD Projekt | |
| 2016 (13th) | Uncharted 4: A Thief's End | Naughty Dog | Sony Interactive Entertainment | |
| 2016 (13th) | Firewatch | Campo Santo | Panic | |
| 2016 (13th) | Inside | Playdead | Playdead | |
| 2016 (13th) | Overwatch | Blizzard Entertainment | | |
| 2016 (13th) | Stardew Valley | ConcernedApe | Chucklefish | |
| 2016 (13th) | Titanfall 2 | Respawn Entertainment | Electronic Arts | |
| 2017 (14th) | What Remains of Edith Finch | Giant Sparrow | Annapurna Interactive | |
| 2017 (14th) | Assassin's Creed Origins | Ubisoft Montreal | Ubisoft | |
| 2017 (14th) | Hellblade: Senua's Sacrifice | Ninja Theory | | |
| 2017 (14th) | Horizon Zero Dawn | Guerrilla Games | Sony Interactive Entertainment | |
| 2017 (14th) | The Legend of Zelda: Breath of the Wild | Nintendo EPD | Nintendo | |
| 2017 (14th) | Super Mario Odyssey | Nintendo EPD Tokyo | Nintendo | |
| 2018 (15th) | God of War | Santa Monica Studio | Sony Interactive Entertainment | |
| 2018 (15th) | Assassin's Creed Odyssey | Ubisoft Quebec | Ubisoft | |
| 2018 (15th) | Astro Bot Rescue Mission | Japan Studio | Sony Interactive Entertainment | |
| 2018 (15th) | Celeste | Maddy Makes Games | | |
| 2018 (15th) | Red Dead Redemption 2 | Rockstar Games | | |
| 2018 (15th) | Return of the Obra Dinn | Lucas Pope | 3909 | |
| 2019 (16th) | Outer Wilds | Mobius Digital | Annapurna Interactive | |
| 2019 (16th) | Control | Remedy Entertainment | 505 Games | |
| 2019 (16th) | Disco Elysium | ZA/UM | ZA/UM | |
| 2019 (16th) | Luigi's Mansion 3 | Next Level Games | Nintendo | |
| 2019 (16th) | Sekiro: Shadows Die Twice | FromSoftware | Activision | |
| 2019 (16th) | Untitled Goose Game | House House | Panic | |
| 2020 (17th) | Hades | Supergiant Games | Supergiant Games | |
| 2020 (17th) | Ghost of Tsushima | Sucker Punch Productions | Sony Interactive Entertainment | |
| 2020 (17th) | Animal Crossing: New Horizons | Nintendo EPD | Nintendo | |
| 2020 (17th) | Half-Life: Alyx | Valve | | |
| 2020 (17th) | The Last of Us Part II | Naughty Dog | Sony Interactive Entertainment | |
| 2020 (17th) | Marvel's Spider-Man: Miles Morales | Insomniac Games | Sony Interactive Entertainment | |
| 2021 (18th) | Returnal | Housemarque | Sony Interactive Entertainment | |
| 2021 (18th) | Deathloop | Arkane Studios | Bethesda Softworks | |
| 2021 (18th) | Forza Horizon 5 | Playground Games | Xbox Game Studios | |
| 2021 (18th) | Inscryption | Daniel Mullins Games | Devolver Digital | |
| 2021 (18th) | It Takes Two | Hazelight Studios | Electronic Arts | |
| 2021 (18th) | Ratchet & Clank: Rift Apart | Insomniac Games | Sony Interactive Entertainment | |
| 2022 (19th) | Vampire Survivors | Poncle | | |
| 2022 (19th) | Elden Ring | FromSoftware | Bandai Namco Entertainment | |
| 2022 (19th) | God of War Ragnarök | Santa Monica Studio | Sony Interactive Entertainment | |
| 2022 (19th) | Marvel Snap | Second Dinner | Nuverse | |
| 2022 (19th) | Stray | BlueTwelve Studio | Annapurna Interactive | |
| 2022 (19th) | Cult of the Lamb | Massive Monster | Devolver Digital | |
| 2023 (20th) | Baldur's Gate 3 | Larian Studios | | |
| 2023 (20th) | Alan Wake 2 | Remedy Entertainment | Epic Games | |
| 2023 (20th) | Dave the Diver | Mintrocket | | |
| 2023 (20th) | The Legend of Zelda: Tears of the Kingdom | Nintendo | | |
| 2023 (20th) | Marvel's Spider-Man 2 | Insomniac Games | Sony Interactive Entertainment | |
| 2023 (20th) | Super Mario Bros. Wonder | Nintendo | | |
| 2024 (21st) | Astro Bot | Team Asobi | Sony Interactive Entertainment | |
| 2024 (21st) | Balatro | LocalThunk | Playstack | |
| 2024 (21st) | Black Myth: Wukong | Game Science | | |
| 2024 (21st) | Helldivers 2 | Arrowhead Game Studios | Sony Interactive Entertainment | |
| 2024 (21st) | The Legend of Zelda: Echoes of Wisdom | Nintendo EPD, Grezzo | Nintendo | |
| 2024 (21st) | Thank Goodness You're Here! | Coal Supper | Panic Inc. | |
| 2025 (22nd) | Clair Obscur: Expedition 33 | Sandfall Interactive | Kepler Interactive | |
| 2025 (22nd) | ARC Raiders | Embark Studios | | |
| 2025 (22nd) | Blue Prince | Dogubomb | Raw Fury | |
| 2025 (22nd) | Dispatch | AdHoc Studio | | |
| 2025 (22nd) | Ghost of Yōtei | Sucker Punch Productions | Sony Interactive Entertainment | |
| 2025 (22nd) | Indiana Jones and the Great Circle | MachineGames | Bethesda Softworks | |

== Multiple nominations and wins ==
=== Developers ===
| Developer | Nominations | Wins |
|---|---|---|
| Nintendo | 12 | 1 |
| EA Vancouver (Note: All nominated as EA Canada.) | 5 | 0 |
| Ubisoft Montreal | 5 | 0 |
| Naughty Dog | 4 | 2 |
| Valve Corporation | 4 | 2 |
| Santa Monica Studio | 4 | 1 |
| Bethesda Game Studios | 3 | 1 |
| BioWare | 3 | 1 |
| Infinity Ward | 3 | 1 |
| Harmonix | 3 | 0 |
| Insomniac Games | 3 | 0 |
| Rockstar North | 3 | 0 |
| Arkane Studios | 2 | 1 |
| Bungie | 2 | 1 |
| Rocksteady Studios | 2 | 1 |
| FromSoftware | 2 | 0 |
| IO Interactive | 2 | 0 |
| Playdead | 2 | 0 |
| Remedy Entertainment | 2 | 0 |

=== Publishers ===
| Publisher | Nominations | Wins |
|---|---|---|
| Sony Interactive Entertainment | 17 | 5 |
| Electronic Arts | 13 | 1 |
| Nintendo | 13 | 1 |
| Ubisoft | 7 | 1 |
| Activision | 6 | 2 |
| Bethesda Softworks | 5 | 2 |
| Rockstar Games | 5 | 0 |
| Xbox Game Studios | 5 | 0 |
| Valve Corporation | 4 | 2 |
| Annapurna Interactive | 3 | 2 |
| Eidos Interactive | 3 | 1 |
| Warner Bros. Interactive Entertainment | 3 | 1 |
| 3909 | 2 | 0 |
| Devolver Digital | 2 | 0 |
| Konami | 2 | 0 |
| Panic | 2 | 0 |
| Sega | 2 | 0 |
