= British Academy Games Award for Performer in a Supporting Role =

Video game award

British Academy Video Games Award for Performer in a Supporting Role
- Awarded for: Best supporting performance in a game
- Presented by: BAFTA
- First award: 2020
- Currently held by: Jeffrey Wright

Highlights
- Most nominations: Troy Baker
- Website: www.bafta.org/games

The British Academy Video Games Award for Performer in a Supporting Role is an award presented annually by the British Academy of Film and Television Arts (BAFTA) in honor of the best supporting performance featured in a game "from voice artistry through to motion capture".

BAFTA has honoured video game performances since the 8th British Academy Video Games Awards ceremony in 2012, with Mark Hamill winning the inaugural award for his performance as the Joker in Batman: Arkham City. From 2012 to 2019, performers in both leading and supporting roles were considered together in the merged category of British Academy Games Award for Performer but, as of the 16th British Academy Games Awards, during a reconfiguration of categories, BAFTA announced that the Performer award would be split into both Leading and Supporting categories.

The inaugural winner in the Supporting category was Martti Suosalo for his role as Ahti the Janitor in Remedy Entertainment's Control. Troy Baker has received the most nominations, with three, two for his role as Higgs in Death Stranding and Death Stranding 2: On the Beach, and one for portraying Joel in The Last of Us Part II.

The current holder of the award is Jeffrey Wright for his role as Chase in Dispatch, who won at the 22nd British Academy Games Awards in 2026.

== Winners and nominees ==
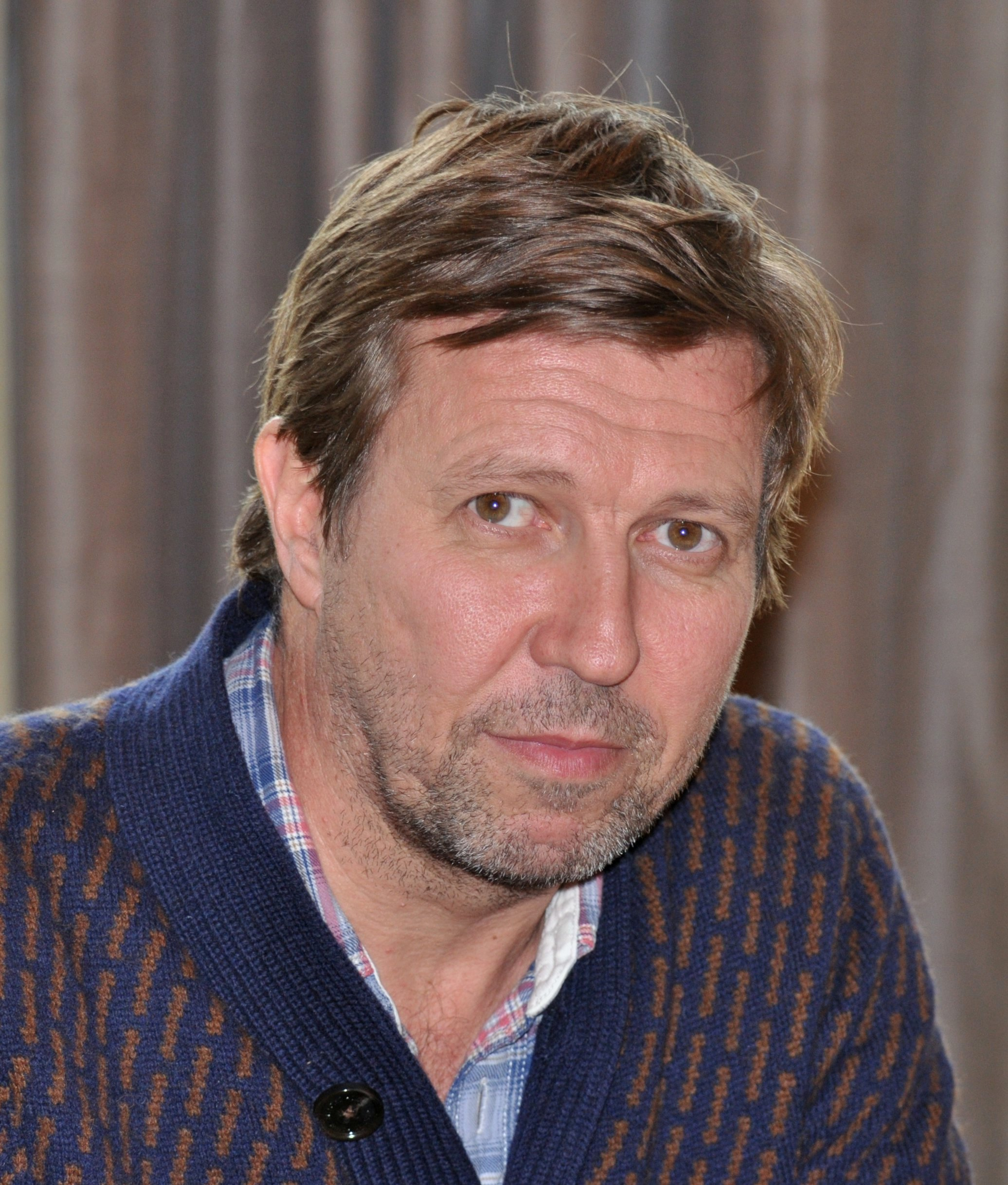
Inaugural recipient Martti Suosalo

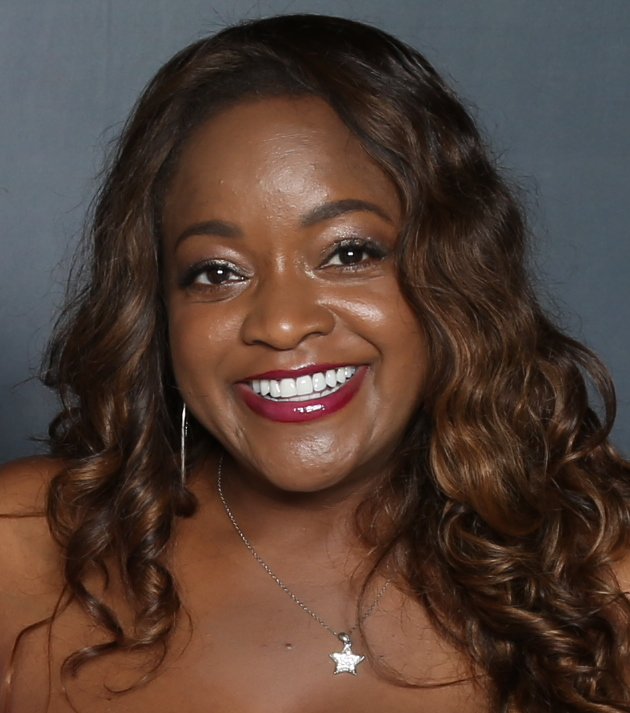
Kimberly Brooks won the award in 2021.

In the following table, the years are listed as per BAFTA convention, and generally correspond to the year of game release in the United Kingdom.

Table key
Indicates the winner

Year	Performer	Game	Role(s)	Ref.
2019 (16th)
2019 (16th)	Martti Suosalo	Control	Ahti the Janitor	
2019 (16th)	Jolene Andersen	Life Is Strange 2	Karen Reynolds	
2019 (16th)	Sarah Bartholomew	Life Is Strange 2	Cassidy (Lucy Rose Jones)	
2019 (16th)	Troy Baker	Death Stranding	Higgs	
2019 (16th)	Léa Seydoux	Death Stranding	Fragile	
2019 (16th)	Ayisha Issa	The Dark Pictures Anthology: Man of Medan	Fliss	
2020 (17th)
2020 (17th)	Logan Cunningham	Hades	Hades, Achilles, Poseidon, Asterius, Charon, and the Storyteller	
2020 (17th)	Troy Baker	The Last of Us Part II	Joel	
2020 (17th)	Jeffrey Pierce	The Last of Us Part II	Tommy	
2020 (17th)	Shannon Woodward	The Last of Us Part II	Dina	
2020 (17th)	Patrick Gallagher	Ghost of Tsushima	Khotun Khan	
2020 (17th)	Carla Tassara	Cyberpunk 2077	Judy Alvarez	
2021 (18th)
2021 (18th)	Kimberly Brooks	Psychonauts 2	Hollis Forsythe	
2021 (18th)	Laura Bailey	Call of Duty: Vanguard	Polina Petrova	
2021 (18th)	Jason Cavalier	Marvel's Guardians of the Galaxy	Drax the Destroyer	
2021 (18th)	Alex Weiner	Marvel's Guardians of the Galaxy	Rocket Raccoon	
2021 (18th)	Maggie Robertson	Resident Evil Village	Lady Dimitrescu	
2021 (18th)	Han Soto	Life Is Strange: True Colors	Gabe Chen	
2022 (19th)
2022 (19th)	Laya Deleon Hayes	God of War Ragnarök	Angrboða	
2022 (19th)	Adam J. Harrington	God of War Ragnarök	Sindri	
2022 (19th)	Danielle Bisutti	God of War Ragnarök	Freya	
2022 (19th)	Ryan Hurst	God of War Ragnarök	Thor	
2022 (19th)	Alison Jaye	Horizon Forbidden West	Alva	
2022 (19th)	Charlotta Mohlin	Immortality	The One	
2023 (20th)	Andrew Wincott	Baldur's Gate 3	Raphael	
2023 (20th)	Debra Wilson	Star Wars Jedi: Survivor	Cere Junda	
2023 (20th)	Ralph Ineson	Final Fantasy XVI	Cidolfus Telamon	
2023 (20th)	Sam Lake	Alan Wake 2	Alex Casey	
2023 (20th)	Tony Todd	Spider-Man 2	Venom	
2023 (20th)	Tracy Wiles	Baldur's Gate 3	Jaheira	
2024 (21st)	Karen Dunbar	Still Wakes the Deep	Finlay	
2024 (21st)	Abbi Greenland & Helen Goalen	Senua's Saga: Hellblade II	The Furies	
2024 (21st)	Aldís Amah Hamilton	Senua's Saga: Hellblade II	Ástríðr	
2024 (21st)	Jon Blyth	Thank Goodness You're Here!	Big Ron	
2024 (21st)	Matt Berry	Thank Goodness You're Here!	Herbert the Gardner	
2024 (21st)	Michael Abubakar	Still Wakes the Deep	Brodie	
2025 (22nd)	Jeffrey Wright	Dispatch	Chase	
2025 (22nd)	Alix Wilton Regan	Lies of P: Overture	Lea Florence Monad	
2025 (22nd)	Charlie Cox	Clair Obscur: Expedition 33	Gustave	
2025 (22nd)	Kirsty Rider	Clair Obscur: Expedition 33	Lune	
2025 (22nd)	Jane Perry	Dead Take	Lia Cain	
2025 (22nd)	Troy Baker	Death Stranding 2: On the Beach	Higgs	

== Multiple wins and nominations ==
=== Performers ===
Performer	Nominations	Wins
Troy Baker	3	0

=== Series ===
Series / game	Nominations	Wins
God of War Ragnarök	4	1
The Last of Us Part II	3	0
Life Is Strange	3	0
Death Stranding	2	0
Senua's Saga: Hellblade II	2	0
Life Is Strange 2	2	0
Marvel's Guardians of the Galaxy	2	0
Still Wakes the Deep	2	0
Thank Goodness You're Here!	2	0
