= Ragnarawk =

2007 video game

Ragnarawk is a musical role-playing video game created for the 2007 Dare to Be Digital video games development competition. The self-proclaimed 'GuitaRPG' combines RPG-style gameplay with a Guitar Hero-style input system. The player character explores a musically themed world fighting enemies using an enchanted guitar.

== Demo version ==
The demo version that was released consisted of a Victorian-styled level featuring enemies loosely themed around classical music. Basic enemies consisted of monsters playing harps, flutes and violins, as well as a hidden mid-boss that rewarded the player with a new guitar after its defeat. The final battle in the demo takes place in a church, against a monster called Morgan, who battles you using a corrupted church organ.

== Development ==
Ragnarawk was developed by Voodoo Boogy, a team of 5 students from Abertay University, 2 from the Computer Games Technology course, and 3 from Computer Arts. In the 2007 Dare to be Digital competition, the game was judged to have the most commercial potential, as well as winning the Audience Award. Ragnarawk was singled out as 'one to watch' by the 2007 British Academy Video Games Awards, and also won the Interactive category at the Scottish Students on Screen awards held in Glasgow on 14 March 2008.
