= God of War Ragnarök =

2022 video game

- Developer: Santa Monica Studio (Note: Additional work by PlayStation Studios Creative Arts, Valkyrie Entertainment, Bluepoint Games, Red Hot CG, SuperAlloy Interactive, Jetpack Interactive, Super Genius, and Original Force. Windows version developed by Jetpack Interactive.)
- Publisher: Sony Interactive Entertainment
- Directors: Eric Williams; Cory Barlog
- Producer: Chad Cox
- Designer: Jason McDonald
- Programmer: Josh Hobson
- Artist: Rafael Grassetti
- Writers: Matt Sophos; Richard Zangrande Gaubert
- Composer: Bear McCreary
- Series: God of War
- Platforms: PlayStation 4; PlayStation 5; Windows
- Release: PS4, PS5; November 9, 2022; Windows; September 19, 2024
- Genres: Action-adventure, hack and slash
- Mode: Single-player

God of War Ragnarök is a 2022 action-adventure game developed by Santa Monica Studio and published by Sony Interactive Entertainment. It was released worldwide on November 9, 2022, for both the PlayStation 4 and PlayStation 5, marking the first cross-generation release in the God of War series, and was released for Windows on September 19, 2024. It is the ninth installment in the series, the eleventh chronologically, and the sequel to 2018's God of War. Loosely based on Norse mythology, the game is set in mythical ancient Scandinavia and features series protagonist, Kratos, and his now teenage son, Atreus. Concluding the Norse era of the series, the story follows Kratos and Atreus' efforts to prevent the nine realms from being destroyed by Ragnarök, the eschatological event which is central to Norse mythology and was foretold to happen in the previous game after Kratos killed the Aesir god Baldur.

The gameplay is similar to the previous 2018 installment. It features combo-based combat, as well as puzzle and role-playing elements. Improvements and additions include Kratos' main weapons: a magical battle axe and his double-chained blades, and a new magical spear; his shield has become more versatile, with different types of shields that have differing offensive and defensive abilities. His son Atreus, as well as some other characters, provide assistance in combat and can be passively controlled, though as a new feature in the series, Atreus is fully controllable in specific story segments.

Originally slated for a 2021 release, the game was delayed in part due to Kratos actor Christopher Judge's health problems in August 2019, and later, the impact of the COVID-19 pandemic on development. A free expansion pack, Valhalla, was released on December 15, 2023. Featuring roguelite gameplay and serving as an epilogue to Ragnarök, it follows Kratos as he participates in a series of trials within Valhalla, where he must come to terms with his past life in Greece.

Ragnarök received critical acclaim, with critics praising its storytelling, characters, emotional weight, visuals, level design, and quality of life improvements over its predecessor. Minor criticism focused on narrative pacing, certain gameplay mechanics, as well as the excessive hints during puzzles. The game sold 5.1 million units in its first week, making it the fastest-selling first-party launch week in PlayStation history, with over 15 million units sold by November 2023. At the Game Awards 2022, Ragnarök received a leading 11 nominations, including Game of the Year, winning six. It received a leading 12 nominations at the 26th Annual D.I.C.E. Awards, ultimately winning seven awards including Adventure Game of the Year. It also received a leading 15 nominations at the 19th British Academy Games Awards, the most nominations for any game in the history of the ceremony, from which it won six awards, including the EE Game of the Year Award.

== Gameplay ==
An example of gameplay in God of War Ragnarök. The HUD is shown at the bottom left, indicating Kratos's health, rage meter, and equipped abilities. The bottom right shows similar info for the companion character (e.g., Atreus).

God of War Ragnarök is a third-person action-adventure game. It features an over-the-shoulder player-controlled camera, and the game is presented with no camera cuts or loading screens. The gameplay is similar to the previous installment, God of War (2018), including being single-player-only. Throughout the game, players battle Norse mythological foes, with more enemy types than in the prior entry, including newer enemies, such as einherjar, wyverns, stalkers (centaur-like creatures with antlers), phantoms, human raiders, and nøkkens, among many others. The developers also added more mini-bosses to give the game more variety.

The player primarily controls the character Kratos in combo-based combat and puzzle game elements. Kratos's main weapons are a magical battle axe called the Leviathan Axe, and his signature double-chained blades, the Blades of Chaos. He also dons his original Guardian Shield, and utilizes hand-to-hand combat. The Leviathan Axe is infused with ice elemental magic. It can be thrown at enemies and magically summoned back to his hand, similar to Thor's hammer Mjölnir. The weapon can be thrown at environmental objects to trigger a damaging explosion, and freeze objects and some enemies in place for puzzle-solving until resummoned. The Blades of Chaos, infused with fire elemental magic, are a pair of blades attached to chains that can be swung around in various maneuvers. A new mechanic for Ragnarök is that the blades can be used like a grappling hook to traverse over chasms, and pick up objects to hurl at enemies. Kratos also obtains a new weapon called the Draupnir Spear, a close- and long-range attack spear that is infused with wind elemental magic and can make copies of itself; Kratos can throw multiple spears at an enemy then have them all explode in rapid succession. The spear is also used to traverse or unblock certain pathways. Each weapon has standard light and heavy attacks. They can be upgraded with runes to allow for magical runic attacks, with slots for a light and heavy magical attack, providing a variety of play style options. Additionally, a "Weapon Signature Move" ability was added, which unleashes a powerful magical attack for the equipped weapon. Another added mechanic is that if on a higher ledge, the player can leap down to perform a powerful weapon attack on enemies below.

The developers also revamped the shield for versatility beyond a minor parry; different shields can be obtained and used offensively or defensively depending on which is equipped. Smaller shields are more for parrying and can stun enemies while larger ones are more defensive and can create a large wave of energy to knock enemies back. Kratos's Spartan Rage ability was also updated to three variants: Fury, Valor, and Wrath. Fury is the standard mode for Spartan Rage and is identical to the previous game in which Kratos uses bare handed attacks to greatly damage enemies. Valor consumes rage energy to restore health and can also be used as a parry if activated precisely, while Wrath unleashes a powerful weapon attack for the equipped weapon.

The character Atreus provides assistance through artificial intelligence (AI), helping in combat, traversal, finding treasures, exploration, and puzzle-solving. The player can passively control Atreus by dictating where he fires his arrows with his bow, either in combat or for puzzle-solving, as well as what magical spectral animals he can summon to further assist with combat. Additionally, Atreus's combat was updated to reflect his character's growth. He has longer chained combos, may initiate a fight before Kratos, and his magical abilities were expanded. There are also points in the game where another character will accompany Kratos instead of Atreus and they too can be passively controlled. For the first time in the God of War series, the player can play entirely as a character other than Kratos (not including Ascension's multiplayer). This only occurs during some story missions when Atreus goes off on his own without Kratos and the player takes full control of Atreus. His gameplay is similar to Kratos in that he has close range combat by hitting enemies with his bow, and he has long range attacks by using his bow to shoot arrows. Additionally, he has special magical arrows, can create a shield from magic, and can summon magical spectral animals to assist in combat. Atreus also has his own rage ability in which he transforms into a wolf (and later, a bear) to deal greater damage. During these missions, Atreus typically has another character accompanying him and the player can passively control this character just as they do with Atreus when playing as Kratos. For some missions, Atreus has a magical floating sword called Ingrid that replaces the accompanying character.

The game retains the role-playing video game (RPG) elements of the 2018 installment. This includes the crafting system with many of the same resources to create new armor or upgrade existing armor and weapons with better perks. There are also many side quests found outside the game's core narrative. Ragnarök also adds armor transmogrification (transmog), which allows the player to change the appearance of their equipped armor to any other acquired armor without losing any of the equipped armor's stats.

Ragnarök has over 70 accessibility options. The game's user interface (UI) system was redesigned "to allow for more flexibility and readability", and more customization options for combat and interaction systems were also added. All accessibility features from the 2018 installment were retained but also expanded upon to allow players to adjust the gameplay to suit their own play style and needs.

The downloadable content (DLC) pack Valhalla, released on December 12, 2023, uses elements of the roguelite genre. Players play solely as Kratos through a series of trials in random procedurally generated levels, selecting what relic, shield, and rage ability to use throughout a trial run. At the end of each challenge within a trial, players are allowed to select an upgrade to either a weapon, relic, or stats, such as strength or defense, but these upgrades only last for the duration of that trial run. Each run-through and the completion of specific gameplay challenges unlocks further rewards that are permanently unlocked. Death resets the player back to the start of the trial. The DLC also added new enemies, as well as returning ones from the Greek era games, such as cyclopes and minotaurs. A new variant of the rage ability was added called Legacy which lets the player wield the Blade of Olympus, like the rage ability from God of War III (2010); this ability can be used in New Game Plus (NG+) of Ragnarök. New cosmetic armor appearances were also added, including Kratos's appearance from the original God of War (2005); these can also be applied in NG+.

== Synopsis ==
=== Setting ===
Ragnarök is set in the world of Norse mythology, taking place three years after the previous game. Unlike that prior entry, all nine realms of Norse mythology are visited as part of the story. Midgard is the primary realm which has become a frigid wasteland, dramatically changed by Fimbulwinter, a three-year long winter that began upon the conclusion of the previous game. The Lake of the Nine, previously navigable by means of a boat, is now frozen over, with Kratos making use of a sleigh and two pet wolves to navigate around the area. The other returning realms include Alfheim, the mystical home of the dark and light Elves; Helheim, the icy land of the dead; Jötunheim, the land of the Giants; the fiery realm Muspelheim, and the fog realm Niflheim, now covered with ice and snow—the latter two were previously optional to explore. The three new realms for Ragnarök include Svartalfheim, the industrial abode of the Dwarves; Vanaheim, the lush home of the Vanir gods as well as the giant wolves Sköll and Hati; and Asgard, the humble home of the Aesir gods that is only visited as part of the story and cannot be accessed after its conclusion. The DLC pack Valhalla adds Valhalla, a remaining area within Asgard where warriors go after death. Within Valhalla are small recreations of the previous realms based on Kratos's memories, as well as areas from his homeland of Greece.

=== Characters ===
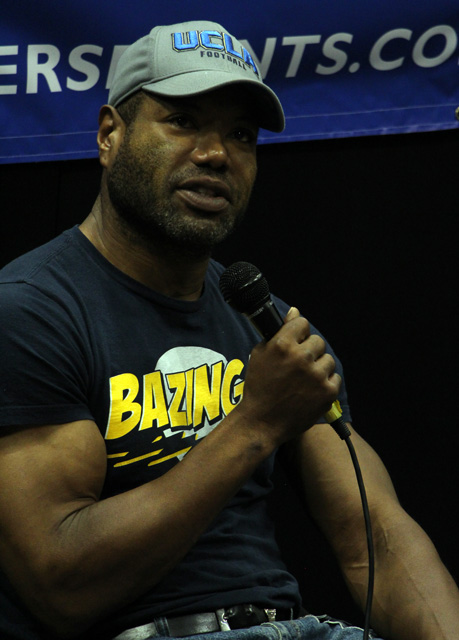
Christopher Judge (pictured in 2015) portrayed Kratos, reprising the role from the 2018 installment.

The main protagonists are Kratos (played by Christopher Judge) and his teenage son, Atreus (Sunny Suljic). Kratos is the former Greek God of War, while Atreus is half Giant, one-quarter god, and one-quarter mortal and is also referred to by his Giant name, Loki. Since the conclusion of the previous game, Kratos and Atreus have been in hiding at their home in the realm of Midgard, training for the inevitable battle ahead of them. They are often accompanied by the head of Mímir (Alastair Duncan), who claims to be the smartest man alive and is a loyal companion who provides knowledge and counsel. Other major returning characters include Freya (Danielle Bisutti), a Vanir goddess, former Queen of the Valkyries, and Odin's ex-wife, who seeks revenge against Kratos and Atreus for the death of her son, Baldur; and the Huldra Brothers, Brok (Robert Craighead) and Sindri (Adam Harrington), a pair of dwarven blacksmiths who assist Kratos and Atreus by forging new gear and also found a way to travel to other realms without using the realm travel table in Týr's Temple. A new character is Angrboda (Laya DeLeon Hayes), one of the last remaining Giants hiding in Jötunheim in a secluded forest called the Ironwood, protecting its animals. Other allies include Ratatoskr (SungWon Cho), the squirrel guardian of the World Tree; Lúnda (Milana Vayntrub), a dwarven blacksmith who is part of Freyr's resistance army; and Skjöldr (A.J. LoCascio), a Midgardian refugee who has settled in Asgard.

The game's primary antagonist is the Aesir god Odin (Richard Schiff), the king of Asgard and Allfather of the Nine Realms. An unseen character in the previous game, he is a pathological liar and manipulator obsessed with preventing his death at Ragnarök and will take any means to stop it. He lost an eye while looking into a rift between worlds in hopes of finding answers to prevent the catastrophic event. His ravens, including Huginn and Muninn, allow him and the Aesir to travel freely to any realm, and they are his watchful eyes over them. Thor (Ryan Hurst), the Aesir God of Thunder and eldest son of Odin, serves as a secondary antagonist; he is the half-brother of Baldur and father of Modi and Magni, all of whom Kratos and Atreus killed in the previous game. He wields the hammer Mjölnir with which he slays Giants, despite being part-Giant himself, and does the bidding of his father although constantly belittled by him. Another antagonist is the Aesir god Heimdall (Scott Porter), another son of Odin and half-brother to Thor who has a superiority complex and believes himself untouchable due to his foresight ability. Known as the "Herald of Ragnarök", he watches over Asgard for threats, rides atop a graðungr, a large, horned, lion like beast named Gulltoppr, and possesses the magical horn Gjallarhorn that signals the start of Ragnarök and opens simultaneous realm travel to Asgard.

Other characters include Freyr (Brett Dalton), Freya's Vanir twin brother who has been leading a resistance against Odin and the Aesir in Vanaheim; Týr (Ben Prendergast), the Norse God of War but a peaceful one who was thought to have been killed by Odin prior to the events of the previous game; Sif (Emily Rose), Thor's golden-haired Aesir wife who wants Thor to stand up to Odin; Thrúd (Mina Sundwall), the daughter of Thor and Sif who dreams of becoming a Valkyrie and is unaware of Odin's true nature; and Surtr (Chris Browning), a fire Giant who lives in Muspelheim. The three Norns also appear, who are the Fates of Norse mythology—Urð (Kate Miller), the Norn associated with the past, Verðandi (Emily O'Brien), the Norn associated with the present, and Skuld (Shelby Young), the Norn associated with the future. Kratos's second wife—Atreus's mother—Laufey (Deborah Ann Woll), a Giantess who goes by Faye for short and had died shortly before the start of the previous game, appears in flashbacks to Kratos, preparing him for her death and her final wish, which was the basis of the previous game.

The DLC expansion Valhalla sees the return of the Greek Sun god Helios (Crispin Freeman), who appears as an illusory head during Kratos and Mímir's journey in Valhalla, briefly taking Mímir's place; Helios mocks and taunts Kratos about his past and his desire for redemption. Former Valkyries Sigrun (Misty Lee), Gunnr (Anna Campbell), and Eir (Sarah Sokolovic), rechristened as Shield Maidens and who had minor roles in Ragnarök, act as guides for Kratos and Mímir in Valhalla.

=== Plot ===
Near the end of Fimbulwinter, Kratos and Atreus return home—fending off an ambush by a vengeful Freya—only to find their wolf, Fenrir, dying. Atreus's grief transforms him into a bear, and he battles Kratos before returning to his senses. Thor arrives with Odin, who proposes leaving them alone and keeping Freya away if Atreus abandons searching for Týr. Kratos refuses and duels Thor to a stalemate. Odin tells Atreus he will leave Kratos alone if the former comes to Asgard. Kratos, Atreus, and Mímir take refuge at Sindri's home on a branch of Yggdrasil and rescue a pacifistic Týr in Svartalfheim. In Alfheim, they discover that only Asgard is doomed to fall, while the other realms will endure under a new champion, hinted to be Atreus as Loki. Kratos and Atreus clash over his alleged destiny.

Atreus is transported to Jötunheim. He meets Angrboda, who shows him a mural (Note: As depicted in the previous game's ending) seemingly foretelling Kratos's death in Ragnarök and Atreus serving Odin. Sworn to secrecy, Atreus is entrusted with spiritual stones containing Giants' souls, putting one into a snake's body, before returning to Midgard. Freya attacks but relents, agreeing to spare Kratos if he breaks the curse binding her to Midgard, which she temporarily circumvents by transforming into a falcon. In Vanaheim, Kratos opens up to Freya about his family's deaths in Greece, his vengeance against Olympus, and the emptiness of revenge. After breaking the curse, Freya and Kratos make amends.

Kratos confronts Atreus over his deceit, prompting Atreus to flee to Asgard in hopes of preventing Kratos's death. There, he teams up with Thor and Thrúd to stop Ragnarök by piecing together an ancient mask for Odin that supposedly grants limitless knowledge. The Norns reveal to Kratos, Freya, and Mímir that Heimdall is fated to kill Atreus. Kratos and Brok journey to Svartalfheim to forge the Draupnir ring into a spear capable of harming Heimdall. After crafting the spear, Brok discovers he had once been revived by Sindri without part of his soul, meaning he could never reach an afterlife if he dies again. Before leaving, Kratos encounters Odin, who mocks his godhood, noting no one ever worshipped him. In Helheim, Atreus unleashes the soulless giant wolf Garm, who rips holes between realms. Reunited, Kratos and Atreus resurrect Fenrir by transferring his soul into Garm, reconciling in the process. In Vanaheim, Kratos kills Heimdall after he threatens Atreus and claims Gjallarhorn, setting Ragnarök in motion.

Atreus heads back to Asgard, puts the mask together, and escapes with it. Týr agrees to join the fight and asks for the mask, but Brok grows suspicious when Týr calls Atreus "Loki", as the Asgardians do. Suddenly, Týr fatally stabs Brok, revealing he is actually Odin in disguise before being forced to leave. Devastated and blaming Atreus for Brok's death, Sindri leaves the group. Determined to bring about Ragnarök, Atreus and Kratos travel to Muspelheim to help Surtr take on his destined primordial form to destroy Asgard.

The realms' united forces gather under Kratos's leadership; he sounds Gjallarhorn to begin the siege of Asgard. It begins poorly, but the tides turn when Angrboda arrives with Fenrir and the snake, now grown into Jörmungandr, who battles Thor while Sindri destroys Asgard's wall. Thrúd and Sif defect after discovering Odin used Midgardian refugees as shields. Thor knocks Jörmungandr back in time and battles Kratos, who convinces him to stand down for his family; Odin kills Thor for disobeying. Kratos, Atreus, and Freya fight Odin, defeating him after Atreus shatters the mask. Atreus traps Odin's soul in a stone, which Sindri smashes. Freyr sacrifices himself, buying time for the group to escape to Midgard as Surtr destroys Asgard.

Angrboda reveals to Kratos and Atreus a mural that Faye had destroyed, allowing them to choose their own fate. Atreus decides to seek out the remaining Giants and says goodbye to Kratos, who finds a mural portraying him as a revered god of hope, peace, and justice. Filled with emotion and newfound optimism, Kratos enlists Freya and Mímir to help restore peace. Asgard's Einherjar are driven out; Freya defeats the vengeful Valkyrie Queen Gná and reclaims her mantle; the Aesir move to Vanaheim, making peace with the Vanir; Thrúd takes up Mjölnir in honor of Thor; and the true Týr is discovered and freed in Niflheim. In the secret ending, Kratos, Freya, Mímir, and a bitter Sindri attend Brok's funeral in Svartalfheim.

==== Valhalla ====
Some time later, Kratos receives an anonymous invitation to Valhalla. He and Mímir break in, only for Kratos to lose his equipment and magical abilities before being defeated in battle. Upon waking on the shores outside, they meet Freya and Sigrun. Now Queen of the Realms, Freya invites Kratos to join her council as the new God of War, but he refuses, unwilling to wield such power again after the destruction he caused in Greece.

After battling through Valhalla, Kratos encounters Týr, the sender of the invitation. Týr urges him to face his past, but Kratos is held back by his anguish. To master himself and accept his history, he undergoes more trials, confronting manifestations of past foes like Modi and Magni, as well as the illusory head of Helios. One trial goes awry when Sigrun breaks Valhalla's rules to save Kratos and Mímir from certain death, weakening her bond to the land. Týr helps Kratos face a vision of his younger self, overcoming fear and self-loathing. Kratos realizes that while his younger self was cruel, he also sacrificed himself to release hope back to humanity (Note: As depicted in the ending of God of War III), proving there was always good in him. Understanding the difference between serving others and being of service, Kratos makes peace with himself and agrees to join Freya's council as a Norse God of War, championing hope.

Through more trials in Valhalla, Mímir admits his deep romantic feelings for Sigrun. In the secret ending, Sigrun chooses not to endure the trials to restore her bond with Valhalla, leaving her role as Shield Maiden to travel the world in search of her purpose, promising to return to Mímir someday.

== Development ==
During the development of God of War (2018), that game's director Cory Barlog confirmed that the 2018 installment would not be Kratos's last game, and that future games would continue to be set in the Norse environment and include Atreus. A sequel was then teased at the end of that game; it ended with Ragnarök looming, as well as a secret ending that showed a vision of Thor confronting Kratos and Atreus at the end of Fimbulwinter. Following this saw various pre-release marketing materials that included the hidden phrase "Ragnarök is coming".

During the PlayStation 5 (PS5) Showcase event on September 16, 2020, a new God of War was officially announced for a 2021 release on the newer console. After Sony Interactive Entertainment revealed their plans to support their previous console until at least 2022, it was later confirmed that the game would also release on the PlayStation 4 (PS4), in turn marking the first cross-gen release in the series. The game's title was confirmed to be God of War Ragnarök during the following year's showcase event, although earlier that year, the title had accidentally been leaked.

Development of the game was impacted by the COVID-19 pandemic. In June 2021, head of PlayStation Studios, Hermen Hulst, confirmed that the game had been delayed, partly due to the pandemic, as he stated that there were issues getting access to performance capture and talent. Santa Monica Studio issued a statement regarding the delay, which said that while they were focused on delivering a top-quality game, they also wanted to maintain the safety of those involved with the development.

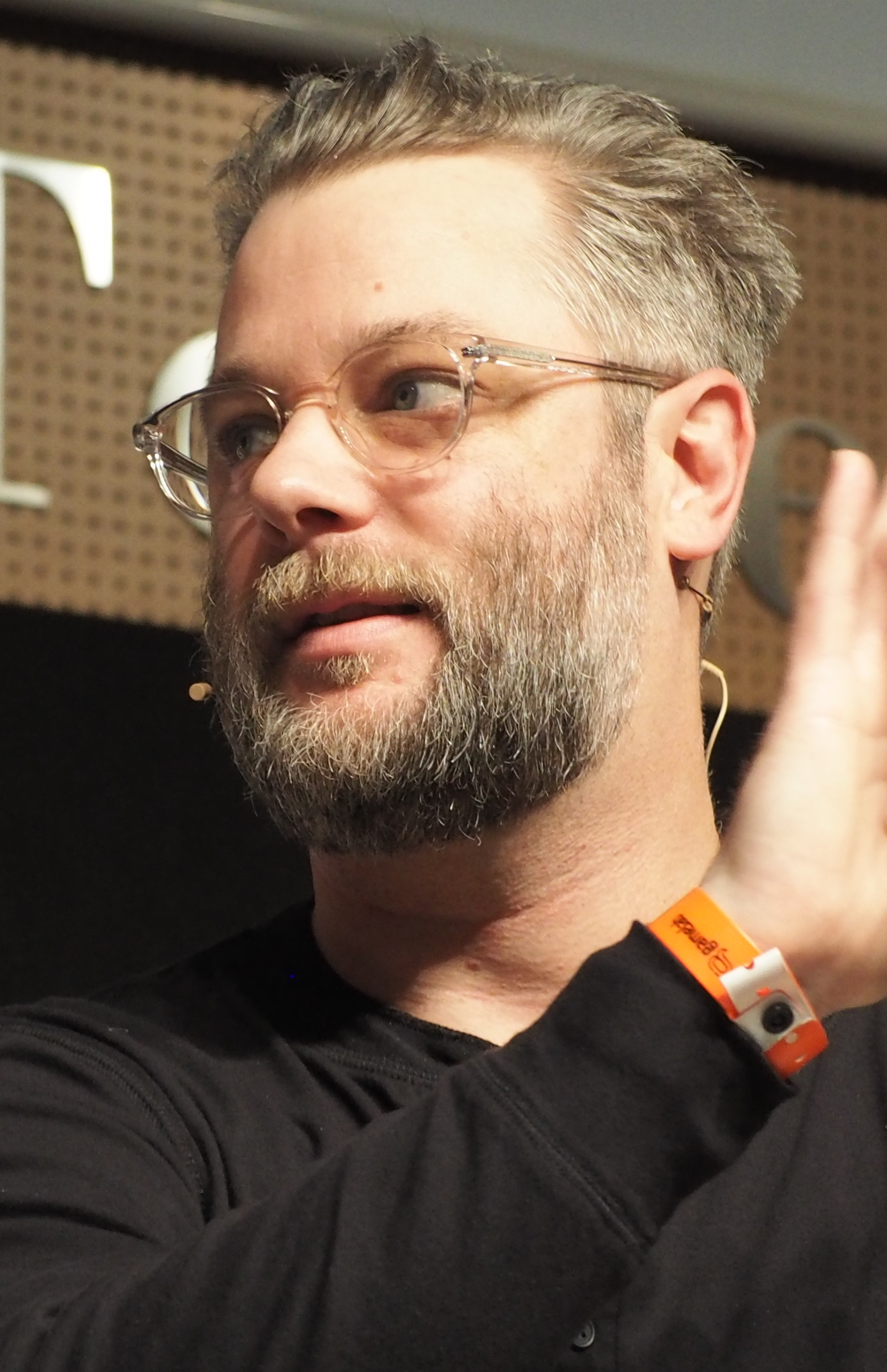
Cory Barlog (pictured in 2019) and Eric Williams served as the creative director and game director, respectively.

The delay brought a unique issue with Atreus actor Sunny Suljic, who was going through puberty during the time of production. Due to the change in his voice, supervising dialogue designer Jodie Kupsco said "We had to go in and even out that performance so [that in the game] it sounds like it took place over a short period of time". Senior producer Ariel Angelotti noted there were no changes to cinematics as a result of the delay, but they had to get creative in how they made the content. In following pandemic guidelines, they had actors "stand in" for background characters in some scenes "to avoid a situation where too many people were on-set". In a series of tweets posted by Kratos actor Christopher Judge in late September 2021, he said that he was the reason that the game was delayed due to surgery he needed in August 2019, and that Santa Monica allowed him time to recover and rehabilitate before continuing production.

During the 2021 PlayStation Showcase event, Eric Williams, who worked on every previous installment, was confirmed as the game's director, continuing the previous era's tradition of having a different director for each game—Barlog served as a producer and creative director. It was also revealed that Ragnarök would conclude the Norse era of the series. The main reason Santa Monica decided to end the Norse era with Ragnarök was due to the game's size and scale. The 2018 installment and Ragnarök each respectively took about five years to develop, and they did not want to take another five years, totaling nearly 15 years, to tell one story. Lead writer Rich Gaubert said there were pros and cons to doing a trilogy or ending the Norse era at two games. The developers debated this and said that Ragnarök could have been split into two games, as it was much larger in scope than they had originally planned. They also had worry if Ragnarök would do the apocalyptic concept justice in just one game. This caused some of the team to have concern if the game would be good as they originally thought that the Norse era would be a trilogy with Ragnarök split into two games. The decision to end the Norse era with Ragnarök was ultimately left to Barlog, and Williams stated that although they had to make adjustments for pacing, the story was not scaled back.

Barlog told Williams that with the second game concluding the Norse saga, the three important plot aspects of the story that had to be retained were that Ragnarök would happen, Atreus would depart from Kratos in the game's conclusion, and Brok would be killed off, which was a decision Barlog had made during the development of the 2018 installment, as Brok was described as the "family dog". Thematically, the game explores what kind of man Kratos would be without his son, and what kind of god would Atreus be without his father. Narrative director Matt Sophos revealed that during early development, there was an idea pitched in which Kratos died during his first battle with Thor and then there would have been a 20-year time jump where Atreus would rescue him from Helheim. This was rejected as Williams did not like it, but he also did not want to repeat a plot sequence that had been done during the Greek games. The emotion and main hook of Ragnarök's actual story were also missing in this proposed idea, and the actual ending worked better for what they wanted to do, which was to say that prophecy and fate are not predetermined.

On July 6, 2022, a new cinematic trailer was unveiled, which confirmed a worldwide release date of November 9, 2022. Another trailer was shown during Sony's 2022 State of Play event on September 13, and it was confirmed that just like the 2018 installment, Ragnarök was done in one shot. Additionally, the game supports options for players to run the game in either higher resolution or better performance, including 4K resolution at 30 frames per second (fps), 1080p resolution at 60fps, a high frame resolution mode in 4K at 40fps, and a high frame performance mode that syncs to 120 hertz. The latter two high frame options are only available for the PS5 version and require monitors with HDMI 2.1. Animation director Bruno Velazquez stated that Santa Monica wanted to ensure that Ragnarök was fully optimized for the PS4, and as such, it does not utilize all of the capabilities of the PS5. Velazquez said that the PS4 version is a visual improvement over the 2018 installment and noted that all of the studio's design goals were achieved on the PS4 version, so the PS5 version "is essentially an enhancement of what's already possible [on the PS4]". The game does, however, include several features exclusive to the PS5 hardware, such as 3D audio, haptic feedback, higher frame rate, and overall better graphics. In terms of design, Velazquez said there were no compromises for the PS4 version and that the game would essentially be the same experience on both consoles. Santa Monica also confirmed that the game would have a photo mode, but it would be added in a post-launch update.

On October 7, 2022, Santa Monica announced that the game had gone gold. Additionally, it was revealed that eight other studios contributed to the development of Ragnarök, including PlayStation Studios Creative Arts, Valkyrie Entertainment, Bluepoint Games, Red Hot, SuperAlloy Interactive, Jetpack Interactive, Super Genius, and Original Force. The exact contribution from each studio was not detailed, except SuperAlloy, which worked on motion capture. SuperAlloy specifically assisted with combat choreography, and the studio provided stunt coordination and stunt work for the game and key characters. Eric Jacobus also revealed that he again did the combat motion capture for Kratos, just as he did in the 2018 installment, as well as for some other characters.

=== Casting ===
During the 2021 PlayStation Showcase event, game director Eric Williams revealed that Richard Schiff would portray Odin. Other casting announcements included Ryan Hurst as Thor, Ben Prendergast as Týr, Laya DeLeon Hayes as Angrboda, and Usman Ally as a dwarf named Durlin. In addition to Christopher Judge and Sunny Suljic returning as Kratos and Atreus, respectively, it was confirmed that Danielle Bisutti and Alastair Duncan would be reprising their respective roles as Freya and Mímir, and that Robert Craighead and Adam J. Harrington would reprise their respective roles as the Huldra Brothers, Brok and Sindri. After Judge found out that Williams would be directing the game, he briefly quit as he was uncertain about Williams; however, Barlog was able to convince Judge that Williams was fully capable of directing the sequel, which Judge affirmed after working with him.

SungWon Cho also announced that he would be providing the voice and motion capture for the squirrel Ratatoskr, and worked directly with the writers to write his scenes. A day before release, Scott Porter revealed that he played Heimdall, and the game's music composer, Bear McCreary, was also confirmed to play a Dwarf musician named Ræb.

Unlike the popular portrayal of Thor by Chris Hemsworth in the Marvel Cinematic Universe (MCU), the Thor in Ragnarök looks closer to his depiction in Norse mythological literature, having a hefty build with long red hair and beard. This type of portrayal was similarly done for the other Norse gods such as Odin himself, shown as a softly spoken and somewhat friendly middle aged man, as in the literature, the Norse gods were not as extravagant as the Greek gods were. In portraying Thor, Hurst took inspiration from another Marvel Comics character, Hulk, citing his rage and power. He also took inspiration from Tommy Lee Jones' character in No Country for Old Men (2007), Sheriff Ed Tom Bell, noting how he was a powerful character that harbored regret.

=== Pre-release fan backlash ===
Following the announcement that Ragnarök had been delayed to 2022, Santa Monica's developers received harassment from some fans, including threatening messages. The delay was announced shortly after Alanah Pearce revealed her involvement on Ragnarök. Fans blamed Pearce for the delay and she received threatening messages of sexual harassment. Barlog came to her defense—and all of Santa Monica's developers—stating that he made the call to delay the game and that it had nothing to do with lower-level staff. Furthermore, after a rumor circulated that Santa Monica would reveal the release date towards the end of June 2022, and that date passed, some developers received explicit images from angry fans in an attempt to get them to reveal the release date.

Additionally, the reveal that Angrboda would be black was met with backlash from some fans. They claimed that since the game is based on mythology originating from North Germanic peoples, she should have been white. Furthermore, the fans accused the developers of cultural appropriation and claimed they used race-swap to score political points. The developers, however, defended the decision due to the diversity of the Dwarves in the game, among other changes such as Mímir having a Scottish accent, and the fact that Angrboda is of a mythological race with a power of transformation. There was also some backlash to the reveal that Ragnarök would be released on both the PS4 and PS5 due to concerns that the PS4 version would hold back the PS5 version. Barlog compared the situation to 2007's God of War II, which released exclusively on the PlayStation 2 despite the PlayStation 3's launch some months earlier, noting that it still worked out well for that game.

=== Soundtrack ===
God of War Ragnarök (Original Soundtrack)

Soundtrack album by Bear McCreary
- Released: November 9, 2022
- Genre: Contemporary classical music
- Length: 1:59:00
- Label: Sony Classical Records

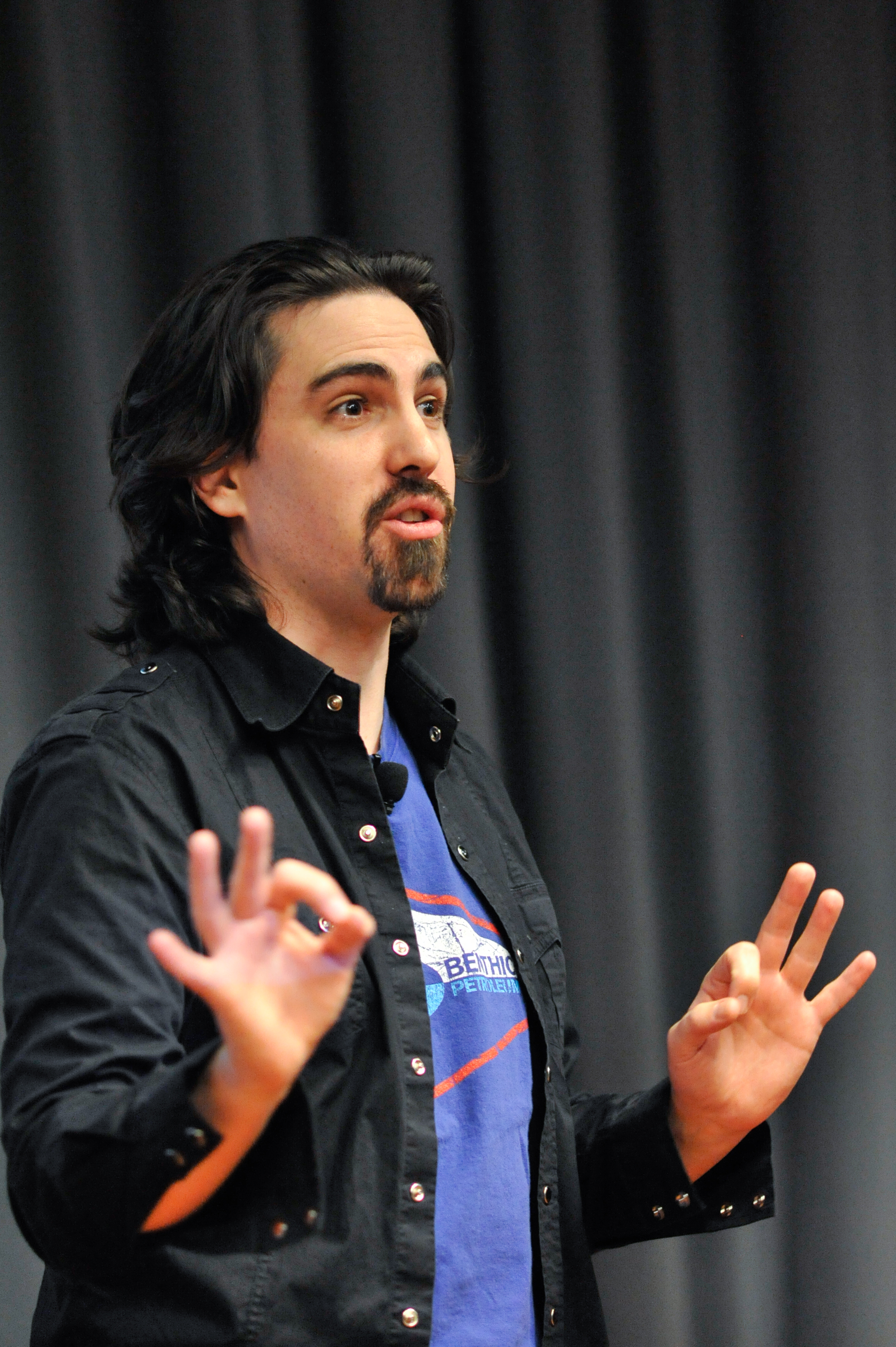
Bear McCreary (pictured in 2010) returned to compose the score for Ragnarök.

God of War Ragnarök (Original Soundtrack) was released on November 9, 2022, by Sony Classical Records and was also included in the game's special editions. It was composed by Bear McCreary, returning from the previous game. The soundtrack features Faroese singer Eivør on the tracks "God of War Ragnarök", "Holding On", "Svartalfheim", "Pull of the Light", and "Remembering Faye". McCreary had previously featured Eivør on the 2018 installment's soundtrack.

Irish folk artist Hozier is featured on the track "Blood Upon the Snow", which was Hozier's first contribution to a video game soundtrack. Hozier was particularly interested in working on the song as he was a fan of the series and also interested in the maturing medium of digital arts. He was also familiar with McCreary's other works. Due to Hozier being signed with Sony's Columbia Records in the United States, he was approached by Sony to contribute to Ragnarök. To help in composing the song, the game's director Eric Williams talked Hozier through the character arcs of Kratos and Atreus. Hozier was also inspired by nature and the natural world. In working with McCreary, Hozier said they were able to find a balance so that the song was "not too elegiac, not too much of an elegy, not too sweet, not too lullaby-esque, not too outrageously doom and gloom, and not too absolutely metal". Paolo Ragusa of Consequence described the song as "a daring, cinematic number that hits at all the thematic notes of God of War: Ragnarök, and finds Hozier using his signature velvety tone to evoke both tenderness and awe". Hozier and McCreary performed the song live at the Game Awards on December 8, 2022.

For the Valhalla DLC, McCreary composed five new tracks, which included contributions from Sam Ewing and Omer Ben-Zvi from McCreary's record label, Sparks & Shadows. Two of the tracks, "Master Thyself " and "The Path", make use of themes from the Greek era of the franchise that were originally composed by Gerard Marino.

== Release ==
God of War Ragnarök was released worldwide on November 9, 2022, for the PlayStation 4 and PlayStation 5. Players who purchase the PS4 version can upgrade to the PS5 version for US$10. In addition to the standard base game (physical and digital), there were three special editions: the Jötnar Edition, the Collector's Edition, and the Digital Deluxe Edition. Early copies of the base game were also marketed as a Launch Edition and included the Risen Snow Armor and Tunic skins for Kratos and Atreus, respectively, which were also included with the three special editions. Pre-orders for all versions opened on July 15, 2022.

The items in both the Jötnar Edition and the Collector's Edition were housed within a box called the Knowledge Keeper's Shrine (a shrine featured in the game). Both editions included a SteelBook game case; however, they did not include a physical copy of the game, only digital versions for both platforms. The centerpiece of both editions was a 16-inch replica of Thor's hammer Mjölnir, and both also included 2-inch carvings of the Vanir twins (Freya and Freyr). Physical items exclusive to the Jötnar Edition included a 7-inch vinyl record of music by Bear McCreary, a pin set of a Falcon, Bear, and Wolf (representing Faye, Kratos, and Atreus, respectively), a replica Draupnir ring, Brok's dice set, and a Yggdrasil cloth map which showed each of the nine realms. Instead of Brok's dice set, the Collector's Edition had a Dwarven dice set. The Digital Deluxe Edition includes the Darkdale armor and weapon skins for Kratos and Atreus, the official God of War Ragnarök soundtrack, a mini art book by Dark Horse Comics, a PlayStation Network avatar set, and a PS4 background theme; all of this DLC was also included with both physical special editions.

Available separately was a limited edition Ragnarök themed DualSense controller for the PS5. Additionally, two PS5 bundles were available the same day as the game's release. One bundle was for the disc version of the console while the other was for the digital version, with both including a regular DualSense controller and a voucher code to download the standard version of the game. Furthermore, an official art book from Dark Horse Comics titled The Art of God of War Ragnarök, in both a standard and deluxe edition, was released on November 29, 2022.

Since launch, Santa Monica has supported the game with patch updates to address software bugs. As well, the developers have added new features along with these free updates. A photo mode, which was revealed prior to launch, was added as part of update patch 3.00 on December 5, 2022. It allows players to take customized in-game screenshots adjusting, among other things, the field of view, depth of view, filters, and the visibility and facial expressions of most major characters. A New Game Plus (NG+) mode was added in update patch 4.00 on April 5, 2023. Players must have completed the game on any difficulty before they can access the mode. Experience levels and previously acquired gear carry over into NG+ (with a couple of game-progression related exceptions), which increases the level cap and adds new gear and resources to be acquired, as well as enemy adjustments to make them more challenging. The option to skip cutscenes was also added. Update patch 6.00 released on November 7, 2024, and added a setting for the PS4 and PS5 versions to reduce hints during puzzles. Also as part of the update, the PS5 version received an enhancement patch for the PlayStation 5 Pro, an updated version of the PS5 that released the same day. The patch adds a favor quality setting that targets 60fps, a High Frame Rate mode that unlocks the game's framerate up to 120fps when running on variable refresh rate-capable displays, and players can also opt between PlayStation Spectral Super Resolution and the prior Temporal Anti-Aliasing technique for resolution upscaling.

Shortly after Ragnarök's release, game director Eric Williams said there would likely not be a story-based expansion pack post-launch. However, during the Game Awards 2023 on December 7, a free DLC pack titled God of War Ragnarök: Valhalla was announced and released on December 12, 2023, as an epilogue to Ragnarök. Although it is an epilogue, Valhalla can be played without completing Ragnarök, but the developers recommended its completion to avoid spoilers of the base game.

In May 2024 during the State of Play event, Sony announced that Ragnarök would be released for Windows (PC) on September 19, 2024, and would also include the Valhalla DLC. The PC port supports unlimited framerate, UltraWide support, and support for Nvidia DLSS 3.7/AMD FSR 3.1/Intel XeSS 1.3. It also supports PlayStation Trophies, which are shared between the PC and console versions of the game. The PC version originally required a PlayStation Network account, which made it unavailable for purchase in many countries, but this requirement was removed on January 30, 2025, with regional restrictions being lifted on June 14, 2025.

As part of the God of War franchise's 20th anniversary celebration, Santa Monica released a free DLC pack for Ragnarök on March 20, 2025, titled the "Dark Odyssey Collection". The name of the DLC is a reference to the original God of War as "Dark Odyssey" was the working title for that game, while the DLC itself includes a skin for Kratos inspired by the one unlocked from beating God of War II's God Mode difficulty. The skin changes the color of Kratos's skin and tattoo to black and gold, respectively, while also giving him solid white eyes. There are also Dark Odyssey armor sets for Kratos, Atreus, and Freya, as well as Dark Odyssey versions of Kratos's weapons and shield. The DLC pack was released as part of update patch 6.02, which also added an Edit Appearance option for Kratos's weapons and shield, enabling transmog on these items; transmog was previously only available for Kratos's armor.

== Reception ==
Reception

Aggregate scores
Aggregator	Score
Metacritic	94/100 (PS5); 90/100 (PC); N/A (PS4)
OpenCritic	97% recommend 100% recommend (Valhalla)

Review scores
Publication	Score
Destructoid	9/10
Electronic Gaming Monthly	5/5
Eurogamer	Recommended
Famitsu	36/40
Game Informer	9.5/10
GameSpot	9/10
GamesRadar+	4.5/5
IGN	10/10
PCMag	4.5/5
Push Square	10/10
Shacknews	9/10
The Telegraph	5/5
Video Games Chronicle	5/5
VG247	5/5
VideoGamer.com	10/10

God of War Ragnarök on PS5 received "universal acclaim" from critics, according to review aggregator website Metacritic, garnering a score of 94/100. This ties it with both the original 2005 installment and the 2018 installment for the highest Metacritic score in the series.

Writing for IGN, Simon Cardy said that Ragnarök provided fresh interpretations of well-known Norse mythological characters, and the actors gave them a unique take that was different from their popular MCU counterparts. Tamoor Hussain of GameSpot opined that out of all the many different takes on Norse mythology, Ragnarök's is "easily one of the most memorable", as it takes the mythology, deconstructs it, and rebuilds it as an epic story about families. Eurogamer's Chris Tapsell, however, felt that because Ragnarök tried to include as much of the series history as possible, the game can feel "both bloated and crowded", but positively noted that due to its length, it meant that there was more of the game to play. Kyle Hilliard at Game Informer wrote that although Ragnarök did not have the same unique impact that the 2018 installment had, everything that worked well in that prior game is present.

In terms of gameplay, reviewers felt Ragnarök does not make any drastic changes over the 2018 installment, but noted some new additions to the existing mechanics. Hussain said that while the core gameplay is fundamentally the same, this is in Ragnarök's favor, as it made it easy to begin playing. Tapsell, however, was somewhat critical of the combat, stating that he would have liked a more systematic approach, and although there is synergy across the weapons' skills, there is practically no room for expression. Cardy was positive on the combat, saying that being able to perform a weapon attack when leaping off a ledge added another layer to battles. He also said the combat harkens back to the series roots, noting that the Blades of Chaos have a more similar feel to how they performed in the Greek games, but still also felt modern. The update to the shield was also praised, with Hussain stating that it "enhances the offensive feel of combat". Cardy similarly felt the shield was more of an offensive tool, and that parrying is a skill players would want to perfect. The variety of enemies and bosses were also praised among the reviewers.

Hilliard opined that the only negative thing about the gameplay was that it was not much different from the previous game. Hussain did have criticism over some gameplay mechanics, stating that in more challenging scenarios, "the mechanics can struggle under the pressure of the increased speed and aggression". Tapsell had similar comments and stated this can be a hindrance in battle. One common criticism among reviewers was the excessive hints in solving puzzles, as the accompanying character offers these hints too soon and too frequently, barely giving the player any time to think about a solution.

Although the role-playing (RPG) elements were praised for giving players a variety of play styles, reviewers felt the system was not innovative. Writing for PCMag, Clay Halton stated it was the game's "most tedious aspect", as it can be difficult to determine which weapon or armor piece needs upgraded. He also noted this was an issue in the prior game, but it was more complicated in the sequel. Tapsell noted that although there were some new ideas, nothing was really memorable or expressive like in other RPGs, and players could get by without engaging much with it. Cardy, however, said the system was more streamlined and felt it encouraged players to make their own custom builds, praising it as accessible and not overwhelming.

The environments were also well-praised for their sense of scale and the changes to returning locations. Hussain praised the changes as not only did they show the effects of Fimbulwinter, but they provided new areas to explore. Tapsell shared similar sentiments and said that the realms were more varied and more inviting, and also said that the sense of scale that was missing in the 2018 installment was resolved in Ragnarök. Halton said that although there is not a noticeable difference from the prior game, largely due to Ragnarök releasing on both the PS4 and PS5, the game is still beautiful, saying that each realm and their respective environments are "thoughtfully crafted".

=== Sales ===
Ragnarök became the fastest-selling first-party game in PlayStation history, selling 5.1 million units in its first week. By February 2023, the game had sold 11 million units worldwide, which increased to over 15 million units by November 19, 2023.

In Japan, the PlayStation 5 version of God of War Ragnarök sold 29,377 physical units, making it the third best-selling retail game during its first week of release in the country. The PlayStation 4 version sold 11,260 physical units, making it the sixth best-selling retail game in the country throughout the same week. In the United Kingdom, although the exact sales numbers were not revealed, it was reported that Ragnarök sold more physical units on its first day than any previous God of War title did in their first week, with 82% of the total sold on PS5 and 18% on PS4. Of the PS5 sales, 12% came from the PS5 bundles. Additionally, it sold 51% more in its first week than the 2018 installment did. This made Ragnarök the biggest launch in the series in the UK, which was largely due to it being the first cross-gen release in the series. In terms of physical units, it was the country's second biggest launch of the year, behind FIFA 23, and it had a bigger launch than Call of Duty: Modern Warfare II, Elden Ring, and Pokémon Legends: Arceus. By the end of 2022, 670,617 units of the game had been sold in the UK, making it the sixth best-selling game of the year in the country. In Germany, the game had sold over 200,000 units by the end of December 2022. It was also the fourth-best-selling game of 2022 in the US.

=== Awards ===
At the 2020 Golden Joystick Awards, the game received the award for Most Wanted Game. That same year, it also received the award for PlayStation.Blog's Most Anticipated Game. It was also a nominee for Most Anticipated Game at the Game Awards in both 2020 and 2021. Various media outlets also included the sequel on their respective lists for most anticipated games of 2021, prior to the game's delay to the following year. It was a nominee for Ultimate Game of the Year at the 2022 Golden Joystick Awards, and was named as Time magazine's #1 game of the year. At the Game Awards 2022, Ragnarök won six of its 11 nominations, which was both the most nominations and most awards won at the event.

It was nominated for Game of the Year and won Best Narrative and Innovation in Accessibility. Christopher Judge also won Best Performance with Sunny Suljic a nominee for the same award. The game won Game of the Year at the 2022 Titanium Awards. It won all 14 of its nominations at the Game Audio Network Guild Awards, representing more than half of the overall winners. It also received a leading 15 nominations at the 19th British Academy Games Awards, the most nominations for any game in the history of the ceremony, which is hosted by the British Academy of Film and Television Arts (BAFTA). It won six of its 15 nominations, which was the most awards won at the event, including the EE Game of the Year Award. During the AIAS' 26th Annual D.I.C.E. Awards, Ragnarök received the most nominations (12), as well as the most awards (7), of the ceremony.

Year	Award	Category	Result	Ref.
2020	Golden Joystick Awards	Most Wanted Game	Won	
2020	The Game Awards 2020	Most Anticipated Game	Nominated	
2021	Golden Joystick Awards	Most Wanted Game	Nominated	
2021	The Game Awards 2021	Most Anticipated Game	Nominated	
2022	20th Game Audio Network Guild Awards	Best Game Trailer Audio	Won	
2022	13th Hollywood Music in Media Awards	Original Score — Video Game (Bear McCreary)	Nominated	
2022	13th Hollywood Music in Media Awards	Original Song — Video Game ("Blood Upon The Snow")	Won	
2022	Titanium Awards	Game of the Year	Won	
2022	Titanium Awards	Best Narrative Design	Won	
2022	Titanium Awards	Best Game Design	Nominated	
2022	Titanium Awards	Best Art Direction	Nominated	
2022	Titanium Awards	Best Sound Direction	Nominated	
2022	Golden Joystick Awards	Ultimate Game of the Year	Nominated	
2022	Golden Joystick Awards	Best Performer (Christopher Judge)	Nominated	
2022	The Game Awards 2022	Game of the Year	Nominated	
2022	The Game Awards 2022	Best Game Direction	Nominated	
2022	The Game Awards 2022	Best Narrative	Won	
2022	The Game Awards 2022	Best Art Direction	Nominated	
2022	The Game Awards 2022	Best Score and Music (Bear McCreary)	Won	
2022	The Game Awards 2022	Best Audio Design	Won	
2022	The Game Awards 2022	Best Performance (Christopher Judge)	Won	
2022	The Game Awards 2022	Best Performance (Sunny Suljic)	Nominated	
2022	The Game Awards 2022	Best Action/Adventure	Won	
2022	The Game Awards 2022	Innovation in Accessibility	Won	
2022	The Game Awards 2022	Players' Voice	Nominated	
2023	New York Game Awards	Big Apple Award for Game of the Year	Nominated	
2023	New York Game Awards	Herman Melville Award for Best Writing in a Game	Won	
2023	New York Game Awards	Statue of Liberty Award for Best World	Nominated	
2023	New York Game Awards	Tin Pan Alley Award for Best Music in a Game	Nominated	
2023	New York Game Awards	Great White Way Award for Best Acting in a Game (Christopher Judge)	Nominated	
2023	21st Visual Effects Society Awards	Outstanding Visual Effects in a Real-Time Project	Nominated	
2023	26th Annual D.I.C.E. Awards	Game of the Year	Nominated	
2023	26th Annual D.I.C.E. Awards	Adventure Game of the Year	Won	
2023	26th Annual D.I.C.E. Awards	Outstanding Achievement in Game Direction	Nominated	
2023	26th Annual D.I.C.E. Awards	Outstanding Achievement in Game Design	Nominated	
2023	26th Annual D.I.C.E. Awards	Outstanding Achievement in Animation	Won	
2023	26th Annual D.I.C.E. Awards	Outstanding Achievement in Art Direction	Won	
2023	26th Annual D.I.C.E. Awards	Outstanding Achievement in Audio Design	Won	
2023	26th Annual D.I.C.E. Awards	Outstanding Achievement in Character (Atreus)	Nominated	
2023	26th Annual D.I.C.E. Awards	Outstanding Achievement in Character (Kratos)	Won	
2023	26th Annual D.I.C.E. Awards	Outstanding Achievement in Original Music Composition	Won	
2023	26th Annual D.I.C.E. Awards	Outstanding Achievement in Story	Won	
2023	26th Annual D.I.C.E. Awards	Outstanding Technical Achievement	Nominated	
2023	50th Annie Awards	Best Character Animation – Video Game	Nominated	
2023	70th Golden Reel Awards	Outstanding Achievement in Sound Editing – Game Dialogue / ADR	Nominated	
2023	70th Golden Reel Awards	Outstanding Achievement in Music Editing – Game Music	Won	
2023	70th Golden Reel Awards	Outstanding Achievement in Sound Editing – Game Effects / Foley	Won	
2023	23rd Game Developers Choice Awards	Game of the Year	Nominated	
2023	23rd Game Developers Choice Awards	Best Audio	Won	
2023	23rd Game Developers Choice Awards	Best Design	Honorable mention	
2023	23rd Game Developers Choice Awards	Innovation Award	Honorable mention	
2023	23rd Game Developers Choice Awards	Best Narrative	Nominated	
2023	23rd Game Developers Choice Awards	Social Impact Award	Honorable mention	
2023	23rd Game Developers Choice Awards	Best Technology	Won	
2023	23rd Game Developers Choice Awards	Best Visual Art	Nominated	
2023	23rd Game Developers Choice Awards	Audience Award	Won	
2023	21st Annual Game Audio Network Guild Awards	Audio of the Year	Won	
2023	21st Annual Game Audio Network Guild Awards	Best Audio Mix	Won	
2023	21st Annual Game Audio Network Guild Awards	Best Cinematic & Cutscene Audio	Won	
2023	21st Annual Game Audio Network Guild Awards	Best Game Foley	Won	
2023	21st Annual Game Audio Network Guild Awards	Best Game Trailer Audio	Won	
2023	21st Annual Game Audio Network Guild Awards	Best Main Theme	Won (Note: Tied with "Haiyue Theme" from Honor of Kings)	
2023	21st Annual Game Audio Network Guild Awards	Best Original Song	Won	
2023	21st Annual Game Audio Network Guild Awards	Best Original Soundtrack Album	Won	
2023	21st Annual Game Audio Network Guild Awards	Best UI, Reward, or Objective Sound Design	Won	
2023	21st Annual Game Audio Network Guild Awards	Creative and Technical Achievement in Music	Won	
2023	21st Annual Game Audio Network Guild Awards	Creative and Technical Achievement in Sound Design	Won	
2023	21st Annual Game Audio Network Guild Awards	Dialogue of the Year	Won	
2023	21st Annual Game Audio Network Guild Awards	Music of the Year	Won	
2023	21st Annual Game Audio Network Guild Awards	Sound Design of the Year	Won	
2023	19th British Academy Games Awards	Best Game	Nominated	
2023	19th British Academy Games Awards	Animation	Won	
2023	19th British Academy Games Awards	Artistic Achievement	Nominated	
2023	19th British Academy Games Awards	Audio Achievement	Won	
2023	19th British Academy Games Awards	Game Design	Nominated	
2023	19th British Academy Games Awards	Music	Won	
2023	19th British Academy Games Awards	Narrative	Nominated	
2023	19th British Academy Games Awards	Performer in a Leading Role (Christopher Judge as Kratos)	Won	
2023	19th British Academy Games Awards	Performer in a Leading Role (Sunny Suljic as Atreus)	Nominated	
2023	19th British Academy Games Awards	Performer in a Supporting Role (Adam J. Harrington as Sindri)	Nominated	
2023	19th British Academy Games Awards	Performer in a Supporting Role (Danielle Bisutti as Freya)	Nominated	
2023	19th British Academy Games Awards	Performer in a Supporting Role (Laya DeLeon Hayes as Angrboða)	Won	
2023	19th British Academy Games Awards	Performer in a Supporting Role (Ryan Hurst as Thor)	Nominated	
2023	19th British Academy Games Awards	Technical Achievement	Nominated	
2023	19th British Academy Games Awards	EE Game of the Year	Won	
2023	Japan Game Awards	Award for Excellence	Won	
2024	66th Annual Grammy Awards	Best Score Soundtrack for Video Games and Other Interactive Media	Nominated	
2024	66th Annual Grammy Awards	Best Immersive Audio Album	Nominated	
2024	The Steam Awards	Best Game on Steam Deck	Won	
2025	67th Annual Grammy Awards	Best Score Soundtrack for Video Games and Other Interactive Media (Valhalla)	Nominated	

== Future ==
Prior to the release of the 2018 installment, Cory Barlog said that after the Norse era of God of War, future games could see the series tackling either Egyptian or Maya mythology. He said that the game alluded to other mythologies co-existing in the world, including Celtic, Japanese, and Irish mythology. Ragnarök would subsequently also have similar references.

The next installment, however, would return the series to Greece with God of War Sons of Sparta, a two-dimensional side-scroller that was released worldwide on February 12, 2026, for the PlayStation 5. Predating Ascension, it is a prequel to the entire series as the game follows Kratos in his youth as he trains at the Agoge with his brother Deimos.

In June 2026, a new entry in the series titled God of War Laufey was announced. It features Kratos' late wife Laufey as the protagonist and focuses on her journey in the afterlife of the gods called Everywhen. A month later, Cory Barlog confirmed during a San Diego Comic-Con panel that the next Kratos-led game would be the next game released after Laufey.
