= 8th British Academy Games Awards =

Game award ceremony in 2012

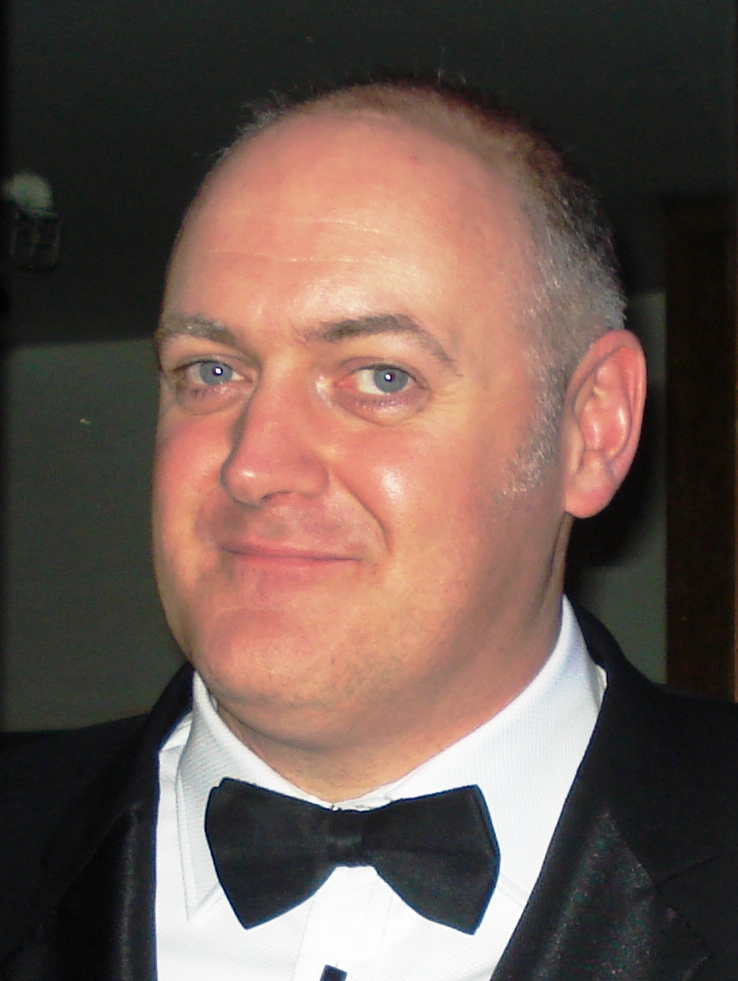
- Date: 16 March 2012
- Location: London Hilton
- Hosted by: Dara Ó Briain
- Best Game: Portal 2
- Most awards: Battlefield 3 & Portal 2 (3)
- Most nominations: Batman: Arkham City & L.A. Noire (9)

The 8th British Academy Video Game Awards (known for the purposes of sponsorship as GAME British Academy Video Games Awards) awarded by the British Academy of Film and Television Arts, was an award ceremony held on 16 March 2012 in the London Hilton. The ceremony honoured achievement in video gaming in 2011 and was hosted by Dara Ó Briain.

== Winners and nominees ==
Winners are shown first in bold.

**Action**: **Batman: Arkham City – Rocksteady Studios/Warner Bros. Interactive Entertainment**; Assassin's Creed: Revelations – Ubisoft Montreal/Ubisoft; Call of Duty: Modern Warfare 3 – Infinity Ward and Sledgehammer Games/Activision; Deus Ex: Human Revolution – Eidos Montréal/Square Enix; Portal 2 – Valve/Valve; Uncharted 3: Drake’s Deception – Naughty Dog/Sony Computer Entertainment	**Online – Browser**: **Monstermind – Bossa Studios/Bossa Studios**; Gardens of Time – Playdom/Playdon; I Am Playr – We R Interactive/Big Balls Productions; Global Resistance – Insomniac Games/Insomniac Games; Skylanders: Spyro’s Universe – Frima Studio/Activision; The Sims Social – Playfish/Electronic Arts
**Artistic Achievement**: **Rayman Origins – Ubisoft**; Batman: Arkham City – Rocksteady Studios/Warner Bros. Interactive Entertainment; L.A. Noire – Team Bondi/Rockstar Games; LittleBigPlanet 2 – Media Molecule; The Elder Scrolls V: Skyrim – Bethesda Game Studios; Uncharted 3: Drake’s Deception – Naughty Dog	**Online Multiplayer**: **Battlefield 3 – EA DICE/Electronic Arts**; Assassin's Creed: Revelations – Ubisoft Montreal/Ubisoft; Call of Duty: Modern Warfare 3 – Infinity Ward and Sledgehammer Games/Activision; Dark Souls – FromSoftware/Namco Bandai Games; Gears of War 3 – Epic Games/Microsoft Game Studios; LittleBigPlanet 2 – Media Molecule/Sony Computer Entertainment Europe
**Audio Achievement**: **Battlefield 3 – EA DICE/Electronic Arts**; Batman: Arkham City – Rocksteady Studios/Warner Bros. Interactive Entertainment; Call of Duty: Modern Warfare 3 – Infinity Ward and Sledgehammer Games/Activision; Dead Space 2 – Visceral Games/Electronic Arts; The Nightjar – Somethin' Else/Somethin' Else; Uncharted 3: Drake’s Deception – Naughty Dog/Sony Computer Entertainment	**Original Music**: **L.A. Noire – Andrew Hale, Simon Hale, Team Bondi/Rockstar Games**; Assassin's Creed: Revelations – Jesper Kyd, Lorne Balfe, Ubisoft Montreal/Ubisoft; Batman: Arkham City – Nick Arundel, Ron Fish, Rocksteady Studios/Warner Bros. Interactive Entertainment; Deus Ex: Human Revolution – Michael McCann, Eidos Montréal/Square Enix; The Elder Scrolls V: Skyrim – Jeremy Soule, Bethesda Game Studios/Bethesda Softworks; Uncharted 3: Drake’s Deception – Greg Edmonson, Naughty Dog/Sony Computer Entertainment
**Best Game**: **Portal 2 – Valve/Valve**; Batman: Arkham City – Rocksteady Studios/Warner Bros. Interactive Entertainment; FIFA 12 – EA Canada/EA Sports; L.A. Noire – Team Bondi/Rockstar Games; The Elder Scrolls V: Skyrim – Bethesda Game Studios/Bethesda Softworks; The Legend of Zelda: Skyward Sword – Nintendo EAD/Nintendo	**Performer**: **Mark Hamill –** **Batman: Arkham City as The Joker**; Aaron Staton – L.A. Noire as Cole Phelps; Nolan North – Uncharted 3: Drake’s Deception as Nathan Drake; Stephen Fry – LittleBigPlanet 2; Stephen Merchant – Portal 2 as Wheatley; Togo Igawa – Total War: Shogun 2 as Dipolomat, Advisor and Military General
**Debut Game**: **Insanely Twisted Shadow Planet – Shadow Planet Productions/Microsoft Studios**; Bastion – Supergiant Games/Warner Bros. Interactive Entertainment; Eufloria – Alex May, Rudolf Kremers, Brian Grainger, Omni Systems Limited/Headup Games; L.A. Noire – Team Bondi/Rockstar Games; Monstermind – Bossa Studios/Bossa Studios; Rift – Trion Worlds/Trion Worlds	**Sports/Fitness**: **Kinect Sports: Season Two – Rare and BigPark/Microsoft Studios**; Dance Central 2 – Harmonix/Microsoft Game Studios; DiRT 3 – Codemasters/Codemasters; F1 2011 – Codemasters/Codemasters; FIFA 12 – EA Canada/EA Sports; Your Shape Fitness Evolved 2012 – Ubisoft/Ubisoft
**Design**: **Portal 2 – Valve/Valve**; Batman: Arkham City – Rocksteady Studios/Warner Bros. Interactive Entertainment; L.A. Noire – Team Bondi/Rockstar Games; LittleBigPlanet 2 – Media Molecule/Sony Computer Entertainment Europe; Super Mario 3D Land – Nintendo EAD Tokyo/Nintendo; The Elder Scrolls V: Skyrim – Bethesda Game Studios/Bethesda Softworks	**Story**: **Portal 2 – Erik Wolpaw, Jay Pinkerton, Chet Faliszek, Valve/Valve**; Batman: Arkham City – Paul Dini, Paul Crocker, Sefton Hill, Rocksteady Studios/Warner Bros. Interactive Entertainment; Deus Ex: Human Revolution – Mary DeMarle, Eidos Montréal/Square Enix; L.A. Noire – Brendan McNamara, Team Bondi/Rockstar Games; The Elder Scrolls V: Skyrim – Emil Pagliarulo, Bethesda Game Studios/Bethesda Softworks; Uncharted 3: Drake’s Deception – Amy Hennig, Naughty Dog/Sony Computer Entertainment
**Family**: **LittleBigPlanet 2 – Media Molecule/Sony Computer Entertainment Europe**; Dance Central 2 – Harmonix/Microsoft Game Studios; Kinect Sports: Season Two – Rare and BigPark/Microsoft Studios; Lego Pirates of the Caribbean: The Video Game – Traveller's Tales/Disney Interactive Studios; Lego Star Wars III: The Clone Wars – Traveller's Tales/LucasArts; Mario Kart 7 – Nintendo EAD Group No. 1 and Retro Studios/Nintendo	**Strategy**: **Total War: Shogun 2 – Creative Assembly/Sega**; Dark Souls – FromSoftware/Namco Bandai Games; Deus Ex: Human Revolution – Eidos Montréal/Square Enix; Football Manager 2012 – Sports Interactive/Sega; From Dust – Ubisoft Montpellier/Ubisoft; Tom Clancy's Ghost Recon: Shadow Wars – Ubisoft Sofia/Ubisoft
**Game Innovation**: **LittleBigPlanet 2 – Media Molecule/Sony Computer Entertainment Europe**; Bastion – Supergiant Games/Warner Bros. Interactive Entertainment; Child of Eden – Q Entertainment/Ubisoft; From Dust – Ubisoft Montpellier/Ubisoft; L.A. Noire – Team Bondi/Rockstar Games; The Legend of Zelda: Skyward Sword – Nintendo EAD/Nintendo	**BAFTA Ones to Watch Award (in association with Dare to Be Digital)**: **Tick Tock Toys – Swallowtail Games**; Joust – Digital Knights; Dreamweaver – Evolved Ape
**Mobile & Handheld**: **Peggle HD – PopCap Games**; Dead Space iOS – IronMonkey Studios/Electronic Arts; Magnetic Billiards: Blueprint – Ste and John Pickford; Quarrel – Denki/UTV Ignition Entertainment; Super Mario 3D Land – Nintendo EAD Tokyo/Nintendo; The Nightjar – Somethin' Else/Somethin' Else	**GAME Award of 2011**: **Battlefield 3 – EA DICE/Electronic Arts**; Batman: Arkham City – Rocksteady Studios/Warner Bros. Interactive Entertainment; Call of Duty: Modern Warfare 3 – Infinity Ward and Sledgehammer Games/Activision; FIFA 12 – EA Canada/EA Sports; L.A. Noire – Team Bondi/Rockstar Games; The Legend of Zelda: Skyward Sword – Nintendo EAD/Nintendo; Minecraft – Mojang/Mojang; Portal 2 – Valve/Valve; The Elder Scrolls V: Skyrim – Bethesda Game Studios/Bethesda Softworks; Uncharted 3: Drake’s Deception – Naughty Dog, Naughty Dog/Sony Computer Entertainment

=== Special ===
- **Markus Persson**

== Multiple nominations and wins ==
=== Games with multiple nominations and wins ===
==== Nominations ====
Nominations	Game
9	Batman: Arkham City
9	L.A. Noire
7	Uncharted 3: Drake’s Deception
6	LittleBigPlanet 2
6	Portal 2
6	The Elder Scrolls V: Skyrim
4	Call of Duty: Modern Warfare 3
4	Deus Ex: Human Revolution
3	Assassin's Creed: Revelations
3	Battlefield 3
3	FIFA 12
3	The Legend of Zelda: Skyward Sword
2	Bastion
2	Dance Central 2
2	Dark Souls
2	From Dust
2	Kinect Sports: Season Two
2	Monstermind
2	Super Mario 3D Land
2	The Nightjar
2	Total War: Shogun 2

==== Wins ====
Awards	Game
3	Battlefield 3
3	Portal 2
2	Batman: Arkham City
2	LittleBigPlanet 2
