= Football Manager 2007 =

2006 video game

- Football Manager 2007
- Developer: Sports Interactive
- Publisher: Sega
- Series: Football Manager
- Platforms: Microsoft Windows, Mac OS X, Xbox 360, PlayStation Portable
- Release: Microsoft Windows, Mac OS X: EU: 18 October 2006; AU: 2 November 2006; NA: 6 November 2006; Xbox 360, PlayStation Portable: EU: 1 December 2006; AU: 7 December 2006
- Genre: Sports management
- Modes: Single player, multiplayer

Football Manager 2007, also known as Worldwide Soccer Manager 2007 in North America, is a football management simulation video game and the third instalment in the Football Manager series developed by Sports Interactive and published by Sega. It was released for Microsoft Windows and Mac OS X on 18 October 2006, with Xbox 360 and PlayStation Portable versions following in December 2006. It was succeeded by Football Manager 2008.

== Gameplay ==
Football Manager 2007 features similar gameplay to that of the Football Manager series. Gameplay consists of taking charge of a professional football team (the game also includes semi-professional, amateur, and international teams) as the manager. Players can sign football players to contracts, manage finances for the club, and give team talks to players. The Football Manager series is a simulation of real world management, with the player being judged on various factors by the club's AI owners and board. As a result of user feedback and continued evolution of the game in general, Sports Interactive introduced over 100 new and revised features to Football Manager 2007. These include:

- A new default GUI, created with the input of user feedback. The new interface is said by Sports Interactive to be more user-friendly.
- A revamped scouting engine, allowing for more realistic scouting of potential stars. including the ability for scouts to learn from their experience. A scout report card is also included in order to provide easier access to important, detailed information about scouting targets.
- Enhanced media interaction, including the ability to make comments on any player in the game world. In previous versions featuring media commentary, managers could only comment on other managers.
- An improved youth team system. The method for generating new players is completely revamped, with the older regen system using recycled statistics from retired players no longer in use.
- Pre-match team talks. Previously, only half-time and full-time team talks could be given. Sports Interactive also increased the half-time team talk functionality: managers can now target individual opposition players for special attention, such as instructing players to close them down or always to tackle them with force.
- A hints and tips screen appears when the game is being saved or loading is taking place.
- An option to ask your own team's players what staff (e.g. coaches and physios) or players they would like you to bring to the club has been added.
- Interactions with the board are improved. The board can authorise the building of new stadia. Clubs can be taken over by a group of investors, who may opt to fire the manager, and thus a player may get sacked in the process).
- The manager, as well as NPCs, can comment on referees' decisions, which are not always correct.

The PlayStation Portable version of the game also included wireless multiplayer for the first time, and was named Football Manager Handheld.

=== Feeder clubs ===
A significant new addition is the ability to create a feeder club affiliation. This allows larger clubs to set up relationships with smaller clubs and vice versa, and can be used by users managing larger clubs to farm out players to their feeder club to gain the first team experience that they are unable to get at higher levels. They both work together for mutual benefit. A smaller club can benefit from the ability of these players on loan deals, and can also receive financial help. The larger club may also profit from merchandising in the smaller club's country. The smaller club may benefit from lucrative friendly matches against their parent side and get the first option on signing players released by the larger team. American and Chinese teams used as feeder clubs are known to significantly boost a parent club's income through merchandising. Many fans had requested Sports Interactive the inclusion of feeder clubs both on the official message boards and elsewhere. Fans of Sports Interactive argue that the uncommonly close relationship between the design team and the players led to the inclusion of such desired features.

== Release ==
On 30 September 2006, a game demo was released in four different versions: Strawberry and Vanilla for both Microsoft Windows and Mac OS X. The Vanilla demo is basic and only includes English language, and the English football league, with no kits, player photos, sound, or graphics. The Strawberry demo includes playable leagues for Brazil, Denmark, England, Finland, France, Italy, Norway, Portugal, Scotland, Spain, and Sweden, many kits and player photos, and language support for many other regions. The game was released in Europe on 18 October 2006, in Australia on 2 November 2006, and in North America on 6 November 2006.

== Reception ==
Reception

Aggregate scores
Aggregator	Score
GameRankings	PSP: 80% X360: 84%
Metacritic	PC: 87/100

Review scores
Publication	Score
Eurogamer	90%
GameSpot	85%
The Times	100%

The game received almost universal critical acclaim on release, with an average score of 87 out of 100 on Metacritic. GameSpot described Football Manager 2007 as a "truly immersive football experience", while PC Gamer suggested that "no other game comes close". Football Manager 2007 was also nominated for a Golden Joystick Award and won the Gamers Award at the BAFTA.

=== Sales ===
Football Manager 2007's computer version received a "Platinum" sales award from the Entertainment and Leisure Software Publishers Association (ELSPA), indicating sales of at least 300,000 copies in the United Kingdom.

== See also ==
- Business simulation game
- Championship Manager 2007
