= 19th British Academy Games Awards =

Game award ceremony in 2023

- Date: 30 March 2023
- Location: Queen Elizabeth Hall
- Hosted by: Frankie Ward
- Best Game: Vampire Survivors
- Most awards: God of War Ragnarök (6)
- Most nominations: God of War Ragnarök (15)

The 19th British Academy Video Game Awards were hosted by the British Academy of Film and Television Arts on 30 March 2023 to honour the best video games of 2022. Held at the Queen Elizabeth Hall in London, the ceremony was hosted by esports presenter Frankie Ward, taking over from Elle Osili-Wood who hosted the previous two ceremonies. The ceremony was livestreamed exclusively on BAFTA's Twitch channel, hosted by games journalist Julia Hardy and comedian Inel Tomlinson. Red carpet coverage was presented by Eurogamer's Aoife Wilson.

Sony Interactive's God of War Ragnarök received the most nominations, with fifteen, becoming the most nominated game in the history of the BAFTA Games Awards. While God of War Ragnarök won the most awards at the ceremony, with six, the top honour, Best Game, was surprisingly won by Vampire Survivors.

== Nominees and winners ==
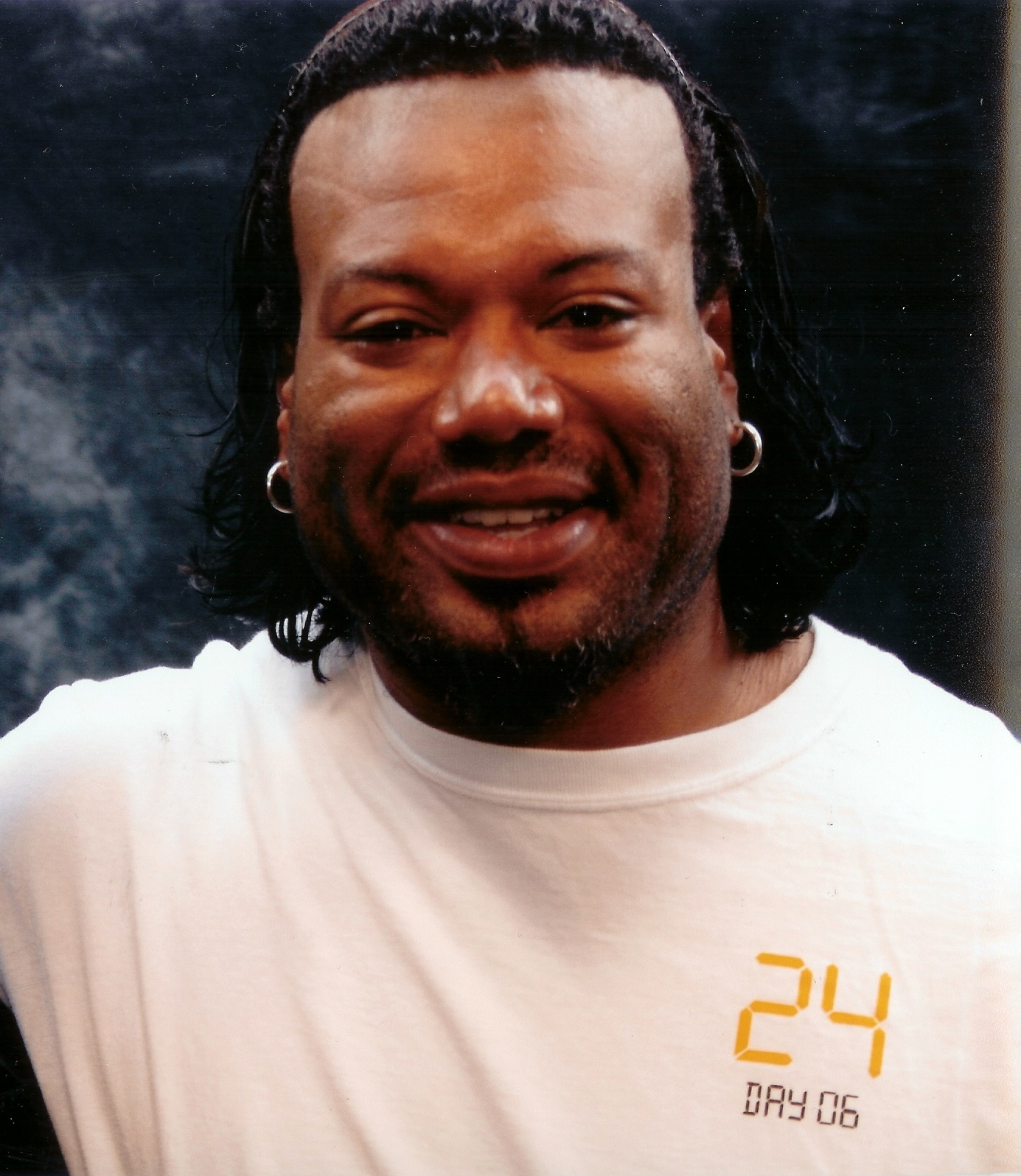
Christopher Judge won Performer in a Leading Role for his role as Kratos God of War Ragnarök.

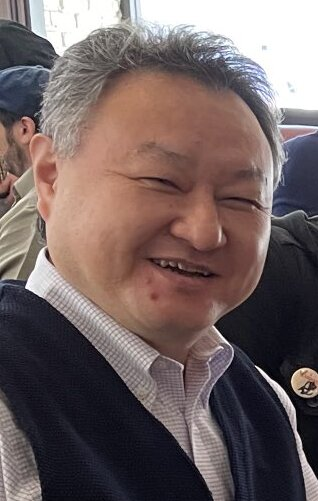
Shuhei Yoshida was the recipient of the BAFTA Fellowship.

The nominees were announced by games journalist Julia Hardy on 2 March 2023 via a livestream held on BAFTA's Twitch channel. An additional panel of live streamers were revealed as the "BAFTA Games Squad", who also streamed the nominations announcement and discussed their thoughts on the nominated games. The EE Game of the Year nominees, the only category voted for by the British public, were announced two days earlier on 28 February 2023, and were selected by a jury of ten industry professionals, with voting closing on 28 March, two days prior to the ceremony.

| Best Game: Vampire Survivors – Poncle; Cult of the Lamb – Massive Monster/Devolver Digital; Elden Ring – FromSoftware/Bandai Namco; God of War Ragnarök – Santa Monica/Sony Interactive Entertainment; Marvel Snap – Second Dinner/Nuverse; Stray – BlueTwelve/Annapurna Interactive | Animation: God of War Ragnarök – Santa Monica/Sony Interactive Entertainment; Call of Duty: Modern Warfare II – Infinity Ward/Activision; Horizon Forbidden West – Guerrilla/Sony Interactive Entertainment; Lego Star Wars: The Skywalker Saga – TT Games/Warner Bros Interactive; Sifu – Sloclap; Stray – BlueTwelve/Annapurna Interactive |
| Artistic Achievement: Tunic – Finji; A Plague Tale: Requiem – Asobo/Focus; Elden Ring – FromSoftware/Bandai Namco; God of War Ragnarök – Santa Monica/Sony Interactive Entertainment; Immortality – Half Mermaid Productions; Pentiment – Obsidian/Xbox Game Studios | Audio Achievement: God of War Ragnarök – Santa Monica/Sony Interactive Entertainment; A Plague Tale: Requiem – Asobo/Focus; Horizon Forbidden West – Guerrilla/Sony Interactive Entertainment; Metal: Hellsinger – The Outsiders/Funcom Oslo; Stray – BlueTwelve/Annapurna Interactive; Tunic – Finji |
| British Game: Rollerdrome – Roll7/Private Division; Citizen Sleeper – Jump Over the Age/Fellow Traveller; OlliOlli World – Roll7/Private Division; Total War: Warhammer III – Creative Assembly/Sega; Two Point Campus – Two Point Studios/Sega; Vampire Survivors – Poncle | Debut Game: Tunic – Finji; As Dusk Falls – Interior Night/Xbox Game Studios; The Case of the Golden Idol – Color Gray Games/Playstack; Stray – BlueTwelve/Annapurna Interactive; Trombone Champ – Holy Wow Studios; Vampire Survivors – Poncle |
| Evolving Game: Final Fantasy XIV Online – Creative Business Unit III/Square Enix; Apex Legends – Respawn Entertainment/Electronic Arts; Dreams – Media Molecule/Sony Interactive Entertainment; The Elder Scrolls Online – ZeniMax Online Studios/Bethesda Softworks; Forza Horizon 5 – Playground Games/Xbox Game Studios; No Man's Sky – Hello Games | Family: Kirby and the Forgotten Land – HAL Laboratory/Nintendo; Disney Dreamlight Valley – Gameloft; Lego Star Wars: The Skywalker Saga – TT Games/Warner Bros Interactive; Mario + Rabbids Sparks of Hope – Ubisoft; Nintendo Switch Sports – Nintendo EPD; Teenage Mutant Ninja Turtles: Shredder's Revenge – Tribute Games/Dotemu |
| Game Beyond Entertainment: Endling: Extinction is Forever – Herobeat Studios/HandyGames; Citizen Sleeper – Jump Over the Age/Fellow Traveller; Gibbon: Beyond the Trees – Broken Rules; I Was a Teenage Exocolonist – Northway Games/Finji; Not For Broadcast – NotGames/TinyBuild; We'll Always Have Paris – Cowleyfornia Studios | Game Design: Vampire Survivors – Poncle; Cult of the Lamb – Massive Monster/Devolver Digital; Elden Ring – FromSoftware/Bandai Namco; God of War Ragnarök – Santa Monica/Sony Interactive Entertainment; Horizon Forbidden West – Guerrilla/Sony Interactive Entertainment; Tunic – Finji |
| Multiplayer: Elden Ring – FromSoftware/Bandai Namco; Call of Duty: Modern Warfare II – Infinity Ward/Activision; FIFA 23 – EA Sports; Overwatch 2 – Blizzard Entertainment; Splatoon 3 – Nintendo; Teenage Mutant Ninja Turtles: Shredder's Revenge – Tribute Games/Dotemu | Music: God of War Ragnarök – Santa Monica/Sony Interactive Entertainment; A Plague Tale: Requiem – Asobo/Focus; Cuphead: The Delicious Last Course – Studio MDHR; Elden Ring – FromSoftware/Bandai Namco; Stray – BlueTwelve/Annapurna Interactive; Tunic – Finji |
| Narrative: Immortality – Half Mermaid Productions; A Plague Tale: Requiem – Asobo/Focus; Citizen Sleeper – Jump Over the Age/Fellow Traveller; God of War Ragnarök – Santa Monica/Sony Interactive Entertainment; Pentiment – Obsidian/Xbox Game Studios; Stray – BlueTwelve/Annapurna Interactive | Original Property: Elden Ring – FromSoftware/Bandai Namco; Citizen Sleeper – Jump Over the Age/Fellow Traveller; Cult of the Lamb – Massive Monster/Devolver Digital; Sifu – Sloclap; Stray – BlueTwelve/Annapurna Interactive; Vampire Survivors – Poncle |
| Performer in a Leading Role: Christopher Judge as Kratos in God of War Ragnarök; Alain Mesa as Alejandro Vargas in Call of Duty: Modern Warfare II; Charlotte McBurney as Amicia in A Plague Tale: Requiem; Manon Gage as Marissa Marcel in Immortality; Siobhan Williams as Laura in The Quarry; Sunny Suljic as Atreus in God of War Ragnarök | Performer in a Supporting Role: Laya Deleon Hayes as Angrboða in God of War Ragnarök; Adam J. Harrington as Sindri in God of War Ragnarök; Alison Jaye as Alva in Horizon Forbidden West; Charlotta Mohlin as The One in Immortality; Danielle Bisutti as Freya in God of War Ragnarök; Ryan Hurst as Thor in God of War Ragnarök |
| Technical Achievement: Horizon Forbidden West – Guerrilla/Sony Interactive Entertainment; Elden Ring – FromSoftware/Bandai Namco; God of War Ragnarök – Santa Monica/Sony Interactive Entertainment; Immortality – Half Mermaid Productions; The Last of Us Part I – Naughty Dog/Sony Interactive Entertainment; Stray – BlueTwelve/Annapurna Interactive | EE Game of the Year: God of War Ragnarök – Santa Monica/Sony Interactive Entertainment; Elden Ring – FromSoftware/Bandai Namco; Horizon Forbidden West – Guerrilla/Sony Interactive Entertainment; Immortality – Half Mermaid Productions; Marvel Snap – Second Dinner/Nuverse; Stray – BlueTwelve/Annapurna Interactive |

- BAFTA Fellowship: Shuhei Yoshida

== Multiple nominations and wins ==
| Game | Nominations | Wins |
|---|---|---|
| God of War Ragnarök | 15 | 6 |
| Stray | 9 | 0 |
| Elden Ring | 8 | 2 |
| Horizon Forbidden West | 6 | 1 |
| Immortality | 6 | 1 |
| A Plague Tale: Requiem | 5 | 0 |
| Tunic | 5 | 2 |
| Vampire Survivors | 5 | 2 |
| Citizen Sleeper | 4 | 0 |
| Call of Duty: Modern Warfare II | 3 | 0 |
| Cult of the Lamb | 3 | 0 |
| Pentiment | 2 | 0 |
| Lego Star Wars: The Skywalker Saga | 2 | 0 |
| Marvel Snap | 2 | 0 |
| Sifu | 2 | 0 |
| Teenage Mutant Ninja Turtles: Shredder's Revenge | 2 | 0 |
