= Before I Forget =

Before I Forget may refer to:

- Before I Forget (Jon Lord album), 1982
- Before I Forget (The Kid Laroi album), 2026
- Before I Forget (film), a 2007 film by Jacques Nolot
- "Before I Forget" (song), a 2004 song by Slipknot
- "Before I Forget" (Eureka episode), a season 1 episode of the sci-fi television series Eureka
- Before I Forget (video game), a 2020 video game
