= British Academy Games Award for Game Beyond Entertainment =

Annual BAFTA award for games

British Academy Video Games Award for Game Beyond Entertainment
- Country: United Kingdom
- Presented by: British Academy of Film and Television Arts
- First award: 2017
- Currently held by: Despelote
- Website: www.bafta.org/games

The British Academy Video Games Award for Game Beyond Entertainment is an award presented annually by the British Academy of Film and Television Arts (BAFTA). It is given in honor of "games that deliver a transformational experience beyond pure entertainment".

The category was first announced on 19 October 2017 and was first awarded at the 14th British Academy Games Awards. Unlike other categories which place emphasis on aspects such as gameplay, animation and technical achievement, entries in Game Beyond Entertainment are judged solely on content, with a specific focus on the game's emotional impact, thematic fit and innovative use of the medium to explore and deliver impactful messages. Throughout its run, the category had awarded and nominated games depicting a range of important social issues and emotional experiences including coping with mental health issues such as depression, anxiety, PTSD and psychosis, dementia, coping with grief and loss, LGBT themes, cultural identity, racial injustice, climate change, censorship and coming of age.

The category was first presented in 2018 at the 14th British Academy Games Awards to Hellblade: Senua's Sacrifice. To date, no developer or publisher has won the award more than once. Among developers, Don't Nod have the most nominations, with three, while Finji, Nintendo, Sony Interactive Entertainment and Square Enix are tied as the most-nominated publishers, with three each.

The current holder of the award is Despelote by Julián Cordero, Sebastián Valbuena and Panic, which won at the 22nd British Academy Games Awards in 2026.

== Eligibility ==
The official BAFTA rules and guidelines state that the category is "for the best game that capitalises on the unique medium of video games to deliver a transformational experience beyond pure entertainment - whether that is to raise awareness through empathy and emotional impact, to engage with real world problems, or to make the world a better place. Entries will be judged on content within the game, as well as any external activity undertaken by the developers to support the aims of the game." Entrants are required to provide three supporting statements of up to 500 words each which outline the ways that their game meets these criteria.

== Winners and nominees ==
In the following table, the years are listed as per BAFTA convention, and generally correspond to the year of game release in the United Kingdom.

Table key
Indicates the winner

Year	Game	Developer(s)	Publisher(s)	Ref.
2017 (14th)	Hellblade: Senua's Sacrifice	Ninja Theory	Ninja Theory	
2017 (14th)	Bury Me, My Love	The Pixel Hunt & Fig	ARTE & Playdius	
2017 (14th)	Last Day of June	Ovosonico	505 Games	
2017 (14th)	Life Is Strange: Before the Storm	Deck Nine	Square Enix	
2017 (14th)	Night in the Woods	InfiniteFall	Finji	
2017 (14th)	Sea Hero Quest VR	Glitchers	Glitchers	
2018 (15th)	My Child Lebensborn	Sarepta Studio	Teknopilot and Sarepta Studio	
2018 (15th)	11-11: Memories Retold	DigixArt, Aardman & Bandai Namco Entertainment Europe	Bandai Namco Entertainment	
2018 (15th)	Celeste	Matt Makes Games Inc.		
2018 (15th)	Florence	Mountains	Annapurna Interactive	
2018 (15th)	Life Is Strange 2	Dontnod Entertainment	Square Enix	
2018 (15th)	Nintendo Labo	Nintendo EPD	Nintendo	
2019 (16th)	Kind Words	Popcannibal	Popcannibal	
2019 (16th)	Civilization VI: Gathering Storm	Firaxis Games	2K Games	
2019 (16th)	Death Stranding	Kojima Productions	Sony Interactive Entertainment	
2019 (16th)	Ring Fit Adventure	Nintendo		
2019 (16th)	Life Is Strange 2	Dontnod Entertainment	Square Enix	
2019 (16th)	Neo Cab	Chance Agency	Fellow Traveller Games	
2020 (17th)	Animal Crossing: New Horizons	Nintendo EPD	Nintendo	
2020 (17th)	Before I Forget	3-Fold Games		
2020 (17th)	Dreams	Media Molecule	Sony Interactive Entertainment	
2020 (17th)	The Last of Us Part II	Naughty Dog	Sony Interactive Entertainment	
2020 (17th)	Spiritfarer	Thunder Lotus Games		
2020 (17th)	Tell Me Why	Dontnod Entertainment	Xbox Game Studios	
2021 (18th)	Before Your Eyes	Goodbye World	Skybound Games	
2021 (18th)	Alba: A Wildlife Adventure	Ustwo Games		
2021 (18th)	Chicory: A Colorful Tale	Greg Lobanov	Finji	
2021 (18th)	Game Builder Garage	Nintendo		
2021 (18th)	It Takes Two	Hazelight Studios	Electronic Arts	
2021 (18th)	Psychonauts 2	Double Fine	Xbox Game Studios	
2022 (19th)	Endling: Extinction is Forever	Herobeat Studios	HandyGames	
2022 (19th)	Citizen Sleeper	Jump Over the Age	Fellow Traveller	
2022 (19th)	Gibbon: Beyond the Trees	Broken Rules Games		
2022 (19th)	I Was a Teenage Exocolonist	Northway Games	Finji	
2022 (19th)	Not For Broadcast	NotGames	TinyBuild	
2022 (19th)	We'll Always Have Paris	Cowleyfornia Studios		
2023 (20th)
2023 (20th)	Tchia	Awaceb	Kepler Interactive	
2023 (20th)	Chants of Sennaar	Rundisc	Focus Entertainment	
2023 (20th)	Goodbye Volcano High	KO OP		
2023 (20th)	Terra Nil	Free Lives	Devolver Digital	
2023 (20th)	Thirsty Suitors	Outerloop Games	Annapurna Interactive	
2023 (20th)	Venba	Visai Games		
2024 (21st)	Tales of Kenzera: Zau	Surgent Studios	Electronic Arts	
2024 (21st)	Botany Manor	Balloon Studios	Whitethorn Games	
2024 (21st)	Kind Words 2 (lofi city pop)	—N/a	—N/a	
2024 (21st)	Senua's Saga: Hellblade II	Ninja Theory	Xbox Game Studios	
2024 (21st)	Tetris Forever	Digital Eclipse		
2024 (21st)	Vampire Therapist	Little Bat Games		
2025 (22nd)	Despelote	Julián Cordero, Sebastián Valbuena	Panic	
2025 (22nd)	And Roger	TearyHand Studio	Kodansha	
2025 (22nd)	Citizen Sleeper 2: Starward Vector	Jump Over the Age	Fellow Traveller	
2025 (22nd)	Consume Me	Jenny Jiao Hsia, AP Thomson	Hexacutable	
2025 (22nd)	S.T.A.L.K.E.R. 2: Heart of Chornobyl	GSC Game World		
2025 (22nd)	The Alters	11 Bit Studios		

== Multiple nominations and wins ==
=== Developers ===
Developer	Nominations	Wins
Don't Nod	3	0
Nintendo EPD	2	1
Digital Eclipse	2	0
Nintendo	2	0

=== Publishers ===
Developer	Nominations	Wins
Square Enix	4	0
Finji	3	0
Nintendo	3	1
Sony Interactive Entertainment	3	0
Xbox Game Studios	3	0
11 Bit Studios	2	0
Digital Eclipse	2	0
Electronic Arts	2	1
Fellow Traveller	2	0
