= Fantastic Contraption (2016 video game) =

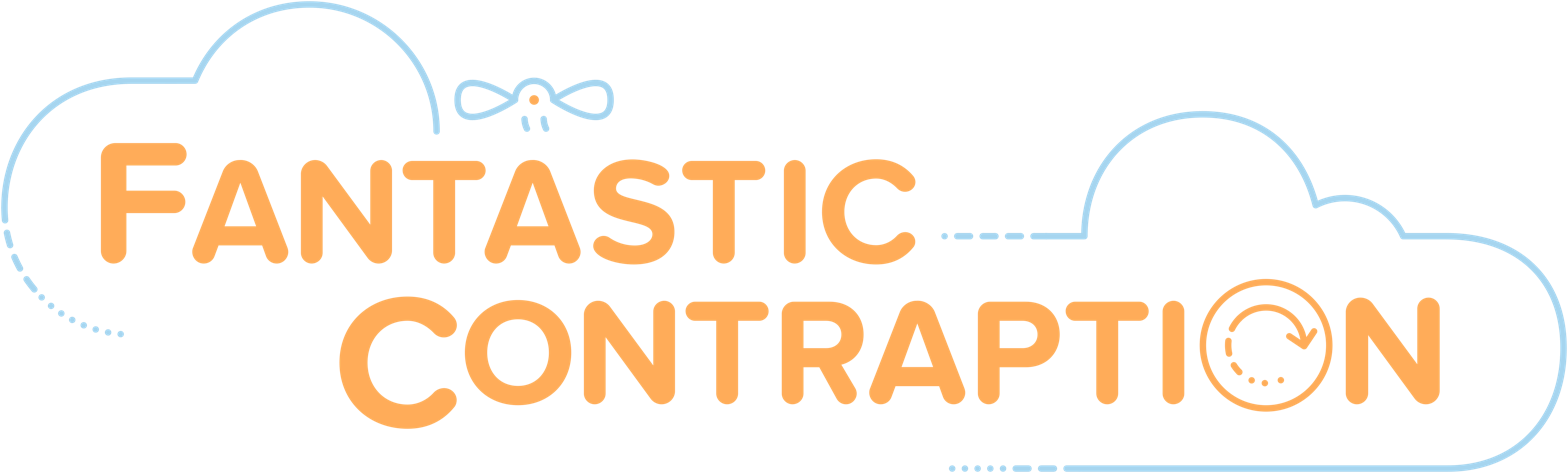
- Developer(s): Northway Games, Radial Games
- Publisher(s): Northway Games
- Platform(s): Microsoft Windows, PlayStation 4 (PSVR)
- Release: WW: April 5, 2016
- Genre(s): Puzzle
- Mode(s): Single-player

Fantastic Contraption is a room scale virtual reality video game for the HTC Vive and PlayStation VR in which players construct machines from building materials to meet challenges. It was released at the HTC Vive's launch on April 5, 2016 and was released for PlayStation VR in July 2017.

== Gameplay ==
Trailer of gameplay, some shots shown in "mixed reality", which blends the virtual reality setting with the real world space

Fantastic Contraption is a puzzle game in which players use the motion controls to construct machines from building materials in order to meet challenges. Using basic components such as beams and wheels, players can design a machine from scratch to suit the needs of the puzzle. Many puzzles require the machine to move across the environment; the player cannot steer the machine after they have completed it, so navigation needs must be built into the design of the machine.

== Development ==
The game was co-developed by Radial Games and Northway Games. The developers helped lead a lot of the early thinking around UX and design in modern VR, including how to capture traditional UI elements, such as menus, saving and loading games, sharing content, et cetera, when a flat-screen menu is not an option. As an example, the team used a virtual helmet to help the player transition from the play space to the "menu world" in which the player could share creations and adjust in-game settings. Much of the team's work centred on how VR is unique when compared to flat games, including developing and sharing design and industry best practices for VR. The team is also well known for pioneering the first mixed-reality trailers to help portray the experience of VR without requiring one be in VR at the time. This approach was used extensively in the Fantastic Contraption trailer. Fantastic Contraption was released as a bundled launch title with the HTC Vive's launch on April 5, 2016 and is scheduled to release for PlayStation VR in 2017.

Fantastic Contraption was originally released in 2008 as a 2D, free-to-play Flash game before it was rebuilt for virtual reality.

== Reception ==
The Gizmodo Australia reviewer wrote that Fantastic Contraption was easily his favorite launch title, as he found none of the other titles interesting. Polygon wrote that the development team's "mixed reality" video stream (which shows the player within the virtual reality environment) made the medium "social".
