= Endling: Extinction is Forever =

2022 video game

- Developer: Herobeat Studios
- Publisher: HandyGames
- Producers: Júlia Vila Chiapella; Eduardo Giménez
- Designers: Samuel Molina; Rob Coll; Jorge León
- Artist: Pablo Hernández
- Writer: Pablo Rodríguez-Tembleco
- Composer: Manel Gil-Inglada
- Platforms: Microsoft Windows; Nintendo Switch; PlayStation 4; Xbox One; PlayStation 5; Xbox Series X/S; Android; iOS
- Release: Windows, Switch, PlayStation 4, Xbox One; July 19, 2022; PS5, Xbox Series X/S; November 3, 2022; Android, iOS; February 7, 2023
- Genres: Adventure, survival
- Mode: Single-player

Endling: Extinction is Forever is an indie survival-adventure game about the last mother fox and her cubs in a post-apocalyptic world. Developed by Barcelona-based studio Herobeat Studios and published by German HandyGames, it was first released for Microsoft Windows, Nintendo Switch, PlayStation 4, and Xbox One on July 19, 2022. Subsequently, it was released for Amazon Luna on October 6, 2022, for PlayStation 5 and Xbox Series X/S on November 3, 2022, and for Android and iOS on February 7, 2023. The game was offered to PlayStation Plus subscribers, at no cost, for the month of July 2023.

== Gameplay ==
Endling is a third-person survival game in a 3D side-scrolling world. The player takes the role of the last mother fox in the world, who is accompanied throughout the game by her young cubs, who must be protected and fed. The cubs can learn different skills that help increase their chances of survival.

== Plot ==
In a post-apocalyptic world, the story begins with a mother fox trying to escape from a human-caused forest fire. Once she manages to escape, she suffers an injury from a fall. She then seeks shelter, where she gives birth to her cubs. During the first few days, everything seems to be going well, until one fateful night, a human scavenger captures one of her cubs. Desperate, the mother fox goes out in an effort to track down the scavenger and find her lost cub, all while ensuring that her other cubs survive in a polluted and desolate world. On her journey, she meets a wide variety of characters, including hunters, a furrier, a mother badger with whom she may become friends and, eventually, Molly, a girl who helps them by giving them food. After several nights following the scavenger's tracks, she finally finds him with her cub and Molly. Molly is revealed to be the scavenger's daughter. She's sick, and her father is unable to afford the medicine to treat her. The next day, Molly dies, and her father is later killed by the furrier, seen by having a hatchet in his chest. Shortly after, a large flood occurs. The cubs manage to climb into a floating bathtub and the mother fox tries to catch up with them, but she is hit by a barrel and swept away by the current. She somehow wakes up in a deserted and desolate place and hears her cubs. Even though she is injured, she goes to rescue them from a mud puddle. Once she gets them all out, they set off on a long journey into the unknown. They find the mother badger mourning the loss of her own cub. She meets the furrier soon after, who is now armed with the scavenger's rifle. She finally reaches an area with vegetation, which appears to be a protected area, and begins to dig her way through the fence that separates this forested area from the rest of the world. The cubs are the first to enter, followed by the mother. But she is hit by a shot from the furrier whilst she is crossing. Her cubs help her move forward, hoping to get her to safety, but she collapses and dies from her injuries. In the final scene, the cubs snuggle up next to her corpse and, afterward, continue on their way with the mother badger, who takes care of them.

The final scene may vary depending on the actions taken by the player, such as how many cubs survived and whether the mother fox helps the badger.

== Reception ==
Reception

Aggregate score
Aggregator	Score
Metacritic	75/100

Review score
Publication	Score
Nintendo World Report	8/10

=== Accolades ===
The game was nominated for the "Games for Impact" award at The Game Awards 2022, which went to As Dusk Falls. The game was also nominated for the "Outstanding Art Direction, Contemporary", "Outstanding Game, Special Class", "Outstanding Original Dramatic Score, New IP", and "Outstanding Game of the Year" awards at the 22nd Annual NAVGTR Awards, winning only one for "Outstanding Game, Special Class". It was also nominated for the "Social Impact Award" at the 23rd Game Developers Choice Awards, which went to Citizen Sleeper; and won the award for "Game Beyond Entertainment" at the 19th British Academy Games Awards. It also won the awards for "Game of the Year" and "Most Significant Impact" at the 2023 Games for Change Awards, whereas its other nomination was for "Best Narrative Game".
