= 23rd Game Developers Choice Awards =

Awards ceremony

- Date: March 22, 2023
- Venue: Moscone Center
- Hosted by: Leslee Sullivant

Highlights
- Most awards: Elden Ring and God of War Ragnarök (3)
- Most nominations: Elden Ring and Stray (6)
- Lifetime Achievement Award: John Romero
- Pioneer Award: Mabel Addis
- Game of the Year: Elden Ring

The 23rd Game Developers Choice Awards was an award ceremony by Game Developers Choice Awards for outstanding game developers and video games which was held on March 22, 2023. The ceremony was held alongside the Independent Games Festival awards.

== Winners and nominees ==
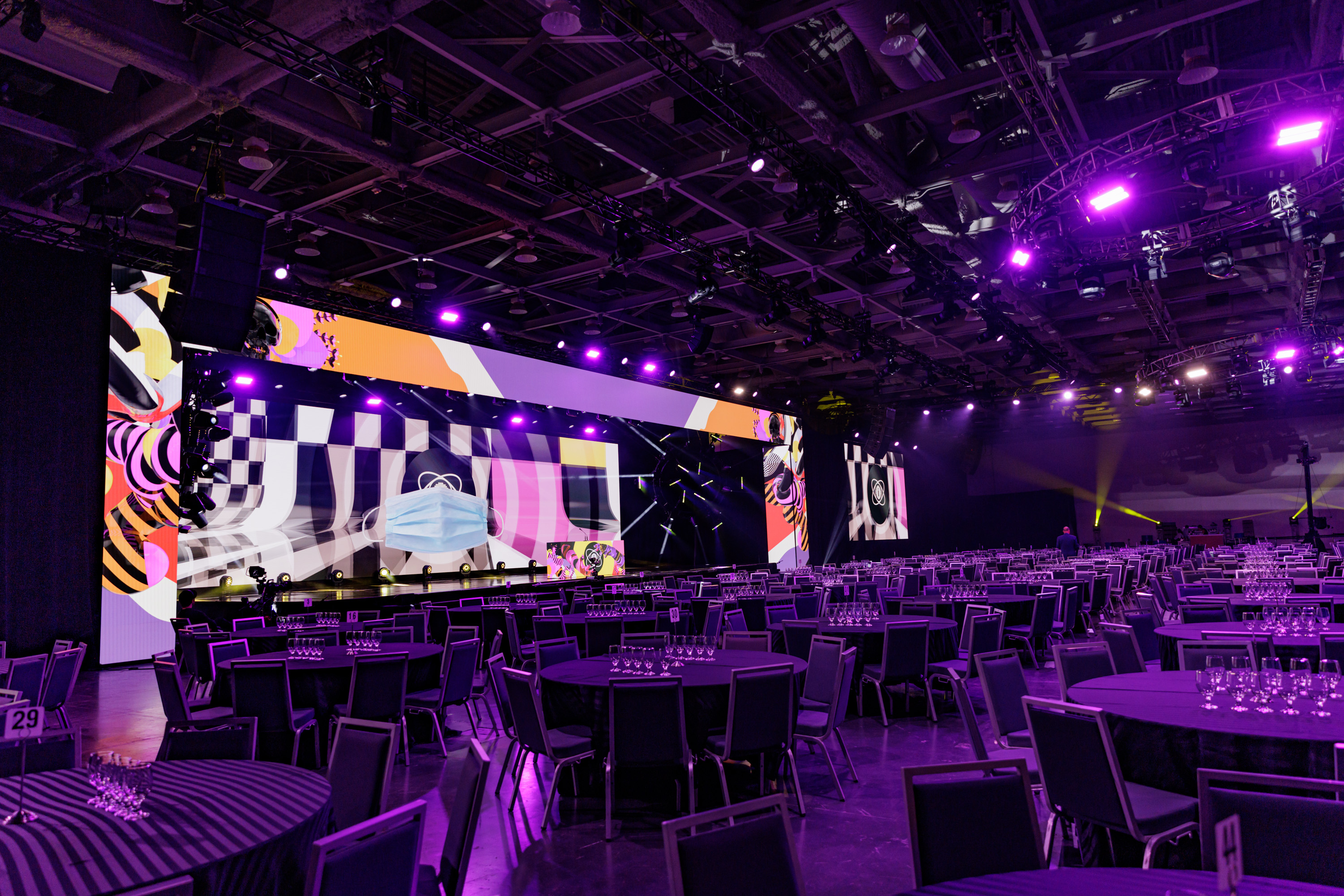
The ceremony was held at the Moscone Center.

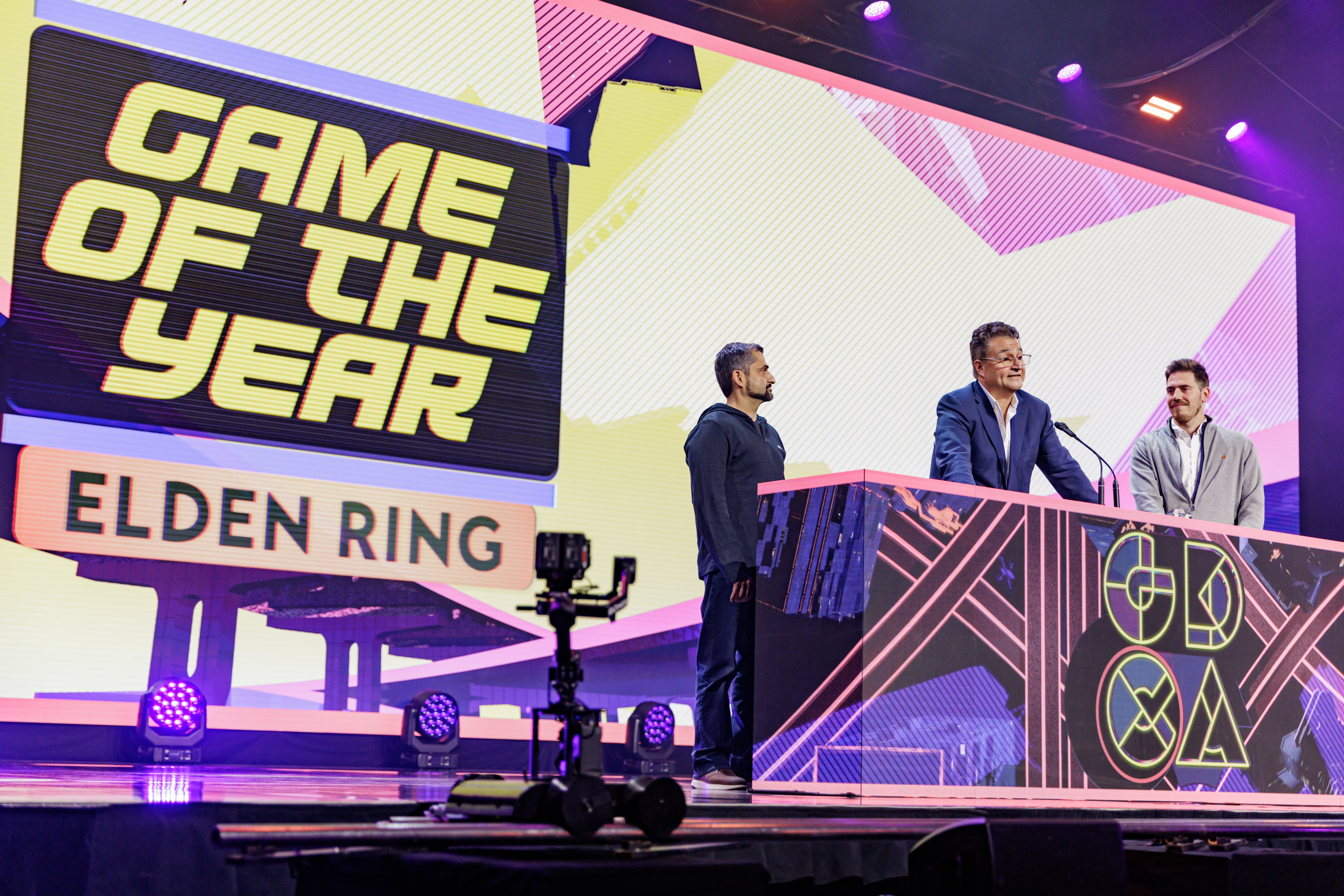
Elden Ring won Game of the Year.

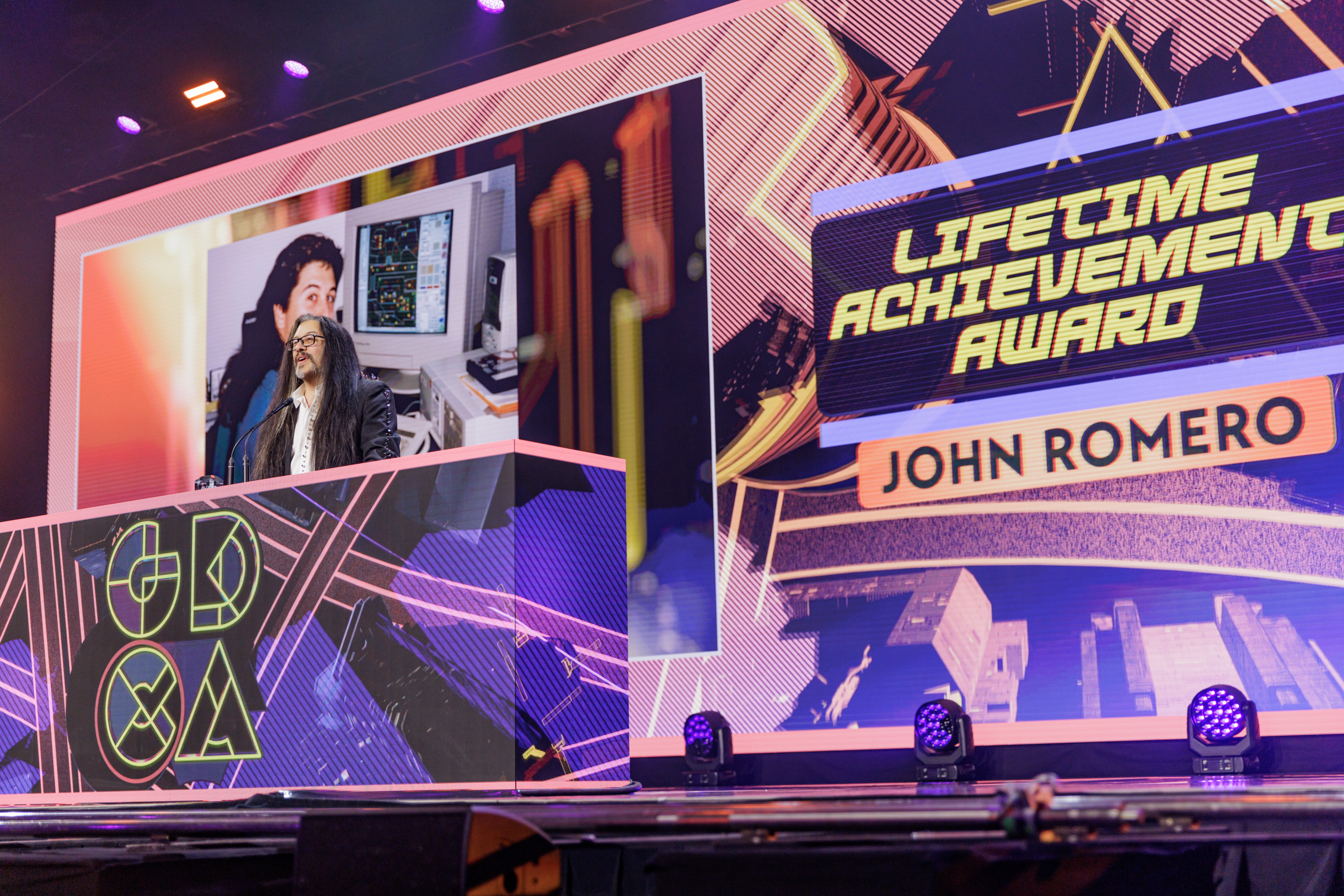
John Romero won the Lifetime Achievement Award.

Nominees were announced on January 26, 2023. Winners (noted in bold below) were named on March 22, 2023, in a ceremony hosted by Leslee Sullivant at the Moscone Center.

=== Game of the Year ===
- **Elden Ring** (FromSoftware Inc. / Bandai Namco Entertainment)
  - God of War Ragnarök (Santa Monica Studio / Sony Interactive Entertainment)
  - Immortality (Sam Barlow / Half Mermaid)
  - Pentiment (Obsidian Entertainment / Xbox Game Studios)
  - Stray (BlueTwelve Studio / Annapurna Interactive)
  - Tunic (TUNIC Team / Finji)

=== Best Audio ===
- **God of War Ragnarök** (Santa Monica Studio / Sony Interactive Entertainment)
  - Elden Ring (FromSoftware Inc. / Bandai Namco Entertainment)
  - Horizon Forbidden West (Guerrilla Games / Sony Interactive Entertainment)
  - Metal: Hellsinger (The Outsiders / Funcom)
  - Stray (BlueTwelve Studio / Annapurna Interactive)

=== Best Debut ===
- **Stray** (BlueTwelve Studio / Annapurna Interactive)
  - NORCO (Geography of Robots / Raw Fury)
  - Neon White (Angel Matrix / Annapurna Interactive)
  - Tunic (TUNIC Team / Finji)
  - Vampire Survivors (poncle)

=== Best Design ===
- **Elden Ring** (FromSoftware Inc. / Bandai Namco Entertainment))
  - Marvel Snap (Second Dinner Studios, Inc. / Nurverse)
  - Neon White (Angel Matrix / Annapurna Interactive)
  - Stray (BlueTwelve Studio / Annapurna Interactive)
  - Tunic (TUNIC Team / Finji)

=== Innovation Award ===
- **Immortality** (Sam Barlow / Half Mermaid)
  - Elden Ring (FromSoftware Inc. / Bandai Namco Entertainment))
  - Neon White (Angel Matrix / Annapurna Interactive)
  - Pentiment (Obsidian Entertainment / Xbox Game Studios)
  - Stray (BlueTwelve Studio / Annapurna Interactive)

=== Best Narrative ===
- **Pentiment** (Obsidian Entertainment / Xbox Game Studios)
  - I Was a Teenage Exocolonist (Northway Games / Finji)
  - Immortality (Sam Barlow / Half Mermaid)
  - God of War Ragnarök (Santa Monica Studio / Sony Interactive Entertainment)
  - Return to Monkey Island (Terrible Toybox / Devolver Digital)

=== Best Technology ===
- **God of War Ragnarök** (Santa Monica Studio / Sony Interactive Entertainment)
  - Call of Duty: Modern Warfare II (Infinity Ward, Raven Software, Beenox, Treyarch, High Moon Studios, Sledgehammer Games, Activision Shanghai, Demonware, Toys for Bob / Activision)
  - Elden Ring (FromSoftware Inc. / Bandai Namco Entertainment)
  - A Plague Tale: Requiem (Asobo Studio / Focus Entertainment)
  - Horizon Forbidden West (Guerrilla Games / Sony Interactive Entertainment)

=== Best Visual Art ===
- **Elden Ring** (FromSoftware Inc. / Bandai Namco Entertainment)
  - God of War Ragnarök (Santa Monica Studio / Sony Interactive Entertainment)
  - Horizon Forbidden West (Guerrilla Games / Sony Interactive Entertainment)
  - Pentiment (Obsidian Entertainment / Xbox Game Studios)
  - Stray (BlueTwelve Studio / Annapurna Interactive)

=== Social Impact Award ===
- **Citizen Sleeper** (Jump Over the Age / Fellow Traveller)
  - As Dusk Falls (INTERIOR/NIGHT / Xbox Game Studios)
  - Endling – Extinction Is Forever (Herobeat Studios / HandyGames)
  - I Was A Teenage Exocolonist (Northway Games / Finji)
  - OlliOlli World (Roll7 / Private Division)
  - We Are OFK (Team OFK)

=== Audience Award ===
- **God of War Ragnarök** (Santa Monica Studio / Sony Interactive Entertainment)

=== Lifetime Achievement Award ===
- John Romero, co-founder of id Software and Ion Storm, and co-creator of the Wolfenstein 3D, Doom, and Quake series

=== The Pioneer Award ===
- Mabel Addis (first female video game designer)
