= My Child Lebensborn =

2018 social simulation game

- Developer: Sarepta Studio
- Publisher: Teknopilot
- Platforms: Android; iOS; Windows; Nintendo Switch; PlayStation 4; Xbox One
- Release: Android; May 8, 2018 iOS; May 18, 2018; Windows, Switch, PS4, Xbox One; June 1, 2021
- Genre: Social simulation game
- Mode: Single-player

My Child Lebensborn (Norwegian: mitt barn Lebensborn) is a 2018 social simulation game developed by Teknopilot and Sarepta Studio and published by Teknopilot for iOS, Android, Windows, Nintendo Switch, PlayStation 4, and Xbox One. The player takes the role of parenting a lebensborn child in Norway after World War II and helps them to navigate growing up and bullying that they face because of their background. The game received praise for its portrayal of emotional trauma, but reviewers noted that the game could be tough to play through.

== Gameplay ==
In My Child Lebensborn, the player plays as an adoptive parent of a Lebensborn child in Norway after World War II. The player must make choices based on off-screen events (e.g. responding to the child being bullied at school) and help to take care of them at home (e.g. making food for them). Each day, there are a limited units of time that the player can use to care for the child, doing activities like washing, feeding, cooking or reading bedside stories. At the end of each chapter of the game, the player sees how their decisions all throughout the gameplay affect the mental status of their child at the end.

== Development ==
While creative producer Elin Festøy, CEO of Teknopilot AS, was working on a documentary about the Norwegian Lebensborn children born in Norway during World War II (being the children of occupied women and German soldiers), she concluded that a documentary film would not reach the intended audience of teenagers. This led to the idea of creating a mobile game that could tell the story of the Lebensborn children and elicit empathy for the children born of enemy soldiers today amongst a broader audience. She met game developer Catharina Bøhler, CEO of Sarepta Studio AS, and they created what Festøy called "a documentary game". Festøy was concerned that a documentary film would just appear to be a movie about old people talking about war, and felt that a video game would work better to show the story of what the children had to go through. There are very few pictures of the bullied Lebensborn children, which meant that the animation of the child in the game could be a more effective visualisation of the situation for the child. "We want to make people know what it felt like for those kids," Festøy said. "We want to highlight how war isn't over until the hatred ends. Our game will be a simulator letting you experience first hand what it is like to grow up in a hateful society, focused on the situation of the child instead of the greater conflict." The game was among the first wave of video game titles that were permitted to display the swastika in Germany. The game was funded partially by a Norwegian government arts grant, and partially through a successful Kickstarter campaign.

== Reception ==
Reviewers commented that the game was not fun because of its dark story, but felt the game taught important lessons for players and was still an experience worth playing. Polygon's Colin Campbell described Lebensborn as a "sort of bullying-management simulation" and praised the game for being an uncomfortable experience. Der Spiegel's Matthias Kreienbrink called the game "not fun" but noted that it was a "partly depressing, partly enlightening" experience. The Guardian's Simon Parkin felt that the game was "fierce and unflinching", and that although the game succeeded as a portrait of time in history, it was a "a difficult ride – oppressive, psychologically strenuous and repetitive." Pocket Gamer's Emily Sowden felt that it was an educational experience that was worth it for the "price of a cup of coffee".

The game won a 2018 BAFTA Games Award from the British Academy of Film and Television Arts (BAFTA) at the 15th British Academy Games Awards on April 4, 2019, as a "Game beyond entertainment".

The Google Play store later blocked access to the game in Germany, Austria, Russia, and France because of the sensitive nature of its content, with a Google spokesperson saying "This game does not violate our sensitive content policies in most countries, but it does so in a few markets." Festøy said "We're working to get more information from Google and have only been told we’ve been removed due to controversial content." The game has since been unblocked.
