= Rebuild 3: Gangs of Deadsville =

Zombie apocolypse strategy/city builder video game

- Developer: Northway Games
- Designer: Sarah Northway
- Series: Rebuild
- Platforms: Windows, MacOS, IOS, Android
- Release: May 29th, 2015
- Genres: Strategy, City builder, Survival
- Mode: Single-player

Rebuild 3: Gangs of Deadsville is a strategy game developed by Sarah Northway of Northway Games and released on May 29th of 2015. It is the third entry in the Rebuild series and the first available as a downloadable PC game following two prior flash games. The game involves managing a group of zombie apocalypse survivors as they expand their base and attempt to rebuild society.

== Gameplay ==
The game is split into a main campaign and customizable quick play mode, with the option to play either in real time or turn-based modes. In the campaign mode, the player must complete goals on a series of twelve maps before advancing to a new one. Each map is set in a different city in Washington state or western Canada. The campaign begins with the player character fleeing Seattle and establishing their first city in Snoqualamie, and ends in Vancouver.

In both options, the core gameplay is the same. The player begins by creating a character and selecting their starting skills and equipment based on their profession. Gameplay takes place from an isometric perspective. The player starts the game with a group of four survivors, with varying skills in one of five jobs: scavengers, soldiers, builders, engineers, and leaders. Survivors can be assigned different tasks inside and outside of the base such as scavenging, farming, building, guarding, and killing zombies, with their success at these tasks determined by the relevant skill level. The player's base is made up of a series of city blocks, with each tile containing a different building type that determines the resources available to the base. To acquire more resources and survivors, the survivors must scavenge outside of the base and expand it once zombies have been cleared from surrounding buildings.

In addition to assigning tasks to survivors, the player must also manage their morale through developing buildings like churches and bars and selecting certain choices in event pop-ups. Survivors may befriend each other, develop romantic relationships, and have children depending on player choices and random events.

As the survivor’s base is developed, eventually the player will have the option to build a city hall, which allows them to establish a government, selecting its policies and values, and interact with other factions of survivors (a new addition to the series), which must be defeated or allied with in the campaign to advance. Depending on the reputation of the player's faction with neighboring factions, they may make requests for resources, trade, or attack the survivor's base.

== Development ==
Rebuild 3: Gangs of Deadsville was developed by Sarah Northway of Northway games as the third entry in her Rebuild series and the first released as a downloadable PC game, with the first two entries being browser games made in Adobe Flash. The game was partially funded on Kickstarter. Throughout development, Kickstarter backers assisted with alpha testing and contributed to writing some of the game's events.

Northway intended to expand the scope of the series, noting in an interview that the two prior Rebuild games were "almost prototypes of what Gangs of Deadsville [would] be." In designing the game, Northway wanted the player to be able to predict outcomes of events based on factors within their control to encourage strategic thinking rather than relying on randomness. Adam Meyer of Steamroller Studios was hired as the lead artist for the game, with the game's vector based art style chosen to distinguish it from previous entries.

The game released in early access on Steam on May 16, 2014.

Rebuild 3: Gangs of Deadsville released out of early access for PC and Mac on May 29, 2015 following the completion of the game's campaign. The IOS and Android edition released on September 3 of the same year.

== Reception ==
On Metacritic, the PC Version has a score of 75/100, and the mobile version a score of 88/100, both indicating "generally favorable reviews."

Reviewing the mobile edition for TouchArcade, Tasos Lazarides praised the gameplay of Rebuild 3, but found the survivors lacked depth, and recommended it as a "a fine strategy sim game with enough depth to challenge but not too much to irritate." In contrast, Sharang Biswas of Hardcore Droid noted the emergent storytelling generated for survivors was a highlight of the game. Gamezebo writer Jillian Werner found the game to be a significant improvement on the series' formula and praised the gameplay and visuals, but noted that having to leave most survivors behind and restart research when moving to a new map created a disjointed sense of progression. The UI was praised by several reviewers in comparison to previous entries.
