= Incredipede =

2012 video game

- Designers: Colin Northway; Sarah Northway
- Artist: Thomas Shahan
- Platforms: Windows; OS X Android iOS; Adobe Flash (demo version)
- Release: 25 October 2012
- Genre: Puzzle
- Mode: Single-player

Incredipede is a physics-based puzzle video game by Canadian studio Northway Games. The game was released on 25 October 2012.

== Gameplay ==
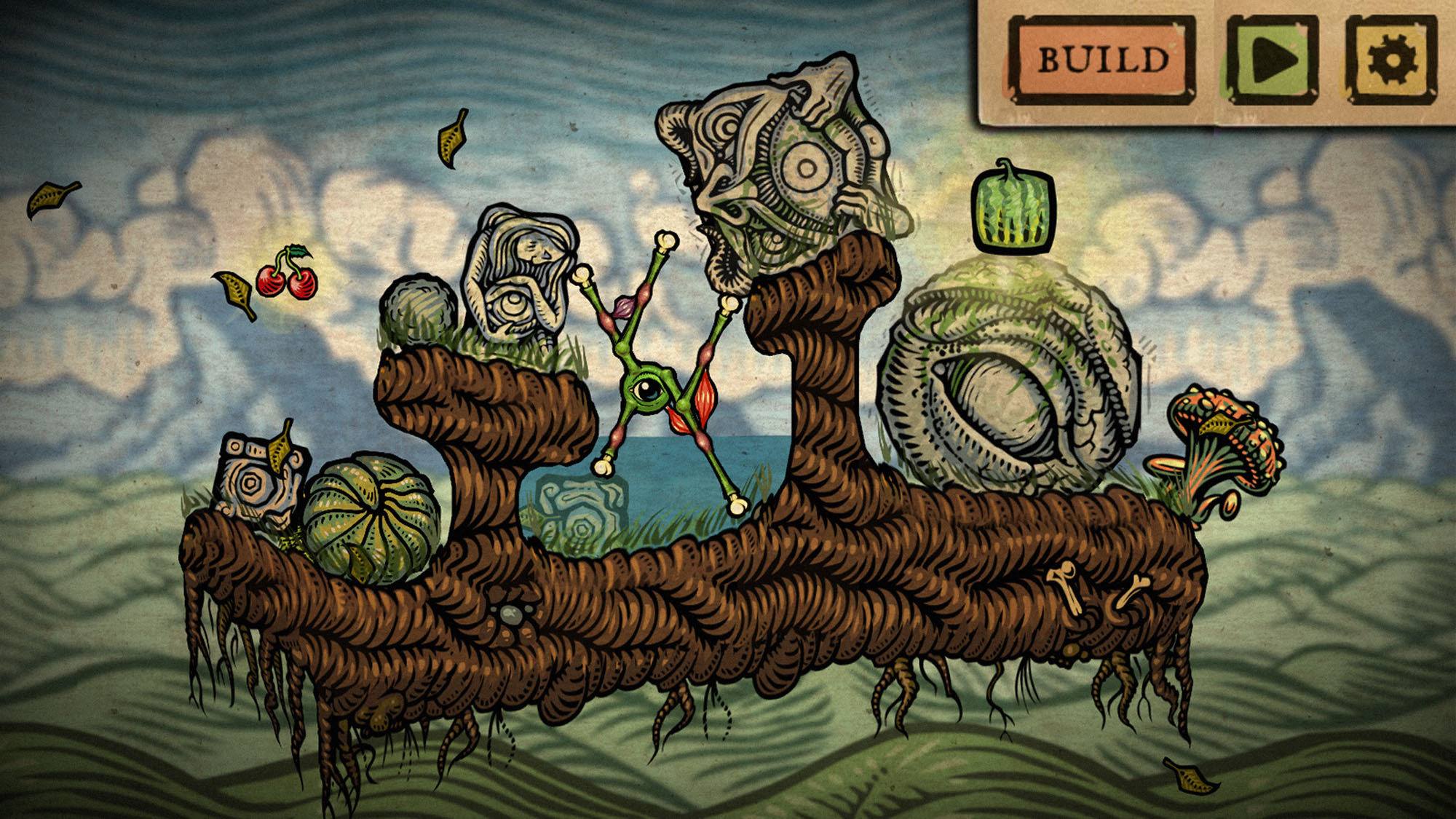
A screenshot of Incredipede in play

The gameplay of Incredipede focuses on the character Quozzle, an Incredipede with the ability to morph to complete short challenges. As the game progresses, new elements such as lava, water or wind appear.

== Development ==
Incredipede was developed by Colin Northway while visiting numerous countries with his wife, Sarah. While reading the Wikipedia article for jumping spiders, Colin found Thomas Shahan, who later became the game artist for Incredipede. Incredipede has been submitted to Steam Greenlight, but Northway feels that if Greenlight did not exist, the game would have been launched on Steam earlier. It was greenlit on 10 January 2013 after being announced as a 2013 IGF finalist.

Incredipede was included in the Humble Bundle PC and Android 7 bundle, presented on 15 October 2013.
