= Stray (video game) =

2022 video game

- Developer: BlueTwelve Studio
- Publisher: Annapurna Interactive
- Directors: Koola and Viv (Note: Colas Koola and Vivien Mermet-Guyenet were credited as Koola and Viv, respectively, opting to forgo their full names and avoid interviews.)
- Producer: Swann Martin-Raget
- Designers: Mathieu Audrain; Alexandre Brodu; Hugo Dunas-Wald
- Programmers: Rémi Bismuth; Sores Hatipoglu; Antonin Ferret
- Writer: Steven Lerner
- Composer: Yann van der Cruyssen
- Engine: Unreal Engine 4
- Platforms: PlayStation 4; PlayStation 5; Windows; Xbox One; Xbox Series X/S; macOS; Nintendo Switch; Nintendo Switch 2
- Release: PS4, PS5, Windows; 19 July 2022; Xbox One, Series X/S; 10 August 2023; macOS; 5 December 2023; Nintendo Switch; 19 November 2024; Nintendo Switch 2; 28 May 2026
- Genre: Adventure
- Mode: Single-player

Stray is a 2022 adventure game developed by BlueTwelve Studio and published by Annapurna Interactive. The story follows a stray cat who falls into a walled city populated by robots, machines, and mutant bacteria; the cat sets out to return to the surface with the help of a drone companion, B-12. The game is presented through a third-person perspective. The player traverses the game world by leaping across platforms and climbing up obstacles, and can interact with the environment to open new paths. Using B-12, they can store items found throughout the world and hack technology to solve puzzles. Throughout the game, the player must evade the antagonistic Zurks and Sentinels, which attempt to kill them.

Development began in 2015, led by BlueTwelve Studio founders Koola and Viv, who wanted to pursue an independent project after working at Ubisoft Montpellier. Stray's aesthetics were influenced by Kowloon Walled City, which the developers felt could be appropriately explored by a cat. The gameplay was inspired by the developers' cats, Murtaugh and Riggs, and the team studied images and videos of cats for research. They found playing as a cat led to interesting level design opportunities, though they encountered challenges in balancing design and gameplay. The decision to populate the world with robot characters further influenced the narrative and backstory.

Stray was announced in 2020 and became highly anticipated. It was released for the PlayStation 4, PlayStation 5, and Windows in July 2022, Xbox One and Xbox Series X/S in August 2023, macOS in December 2023, Nintendo Switch in November 2024, and Nintendo Switch 2 in May 2026. It received generally positive reviews, with praise for its artistic design, cat gameplay, narrative, original score, and platforming elements, though critics were divided on the combat and stealth sequences. Stray received accolades at the Game Awards, Game Developers Choice Awards, and Golden Joystick Awards, and appeared on multiple publications' year-end lists. An animated film adaptation is in development.

== Gameplay ==
In Stray, the player controls a stray cat who traverses the environment by leaping across platforms and climbing up obstacles.

Stray is an adventure game played by a single player in a third-person perspective. The player controls a stray cat, who can leap across platforms, climb up obstacles, and open new paths by interacting with the environment, such as clawing at objects, climbing in buckets, overturning paint cans, and operating a vending machine. The narrative progresses by solving puzzles, often involving moving obstacles. Optional activities include sleeping, meowing, and nuzzling up to non-player characters, most of which elicit a response. Some levels have open-world elements, allowing the player to roam freely.

The player is accompanied by a drone companion, B-12, who assists by translating the language of other characters, storing items found throughout the world, providing light, and hacking into various technologies to open paths and solve puzzles. Throughout the game, the player finds several of B-12's memories, providing more context for the story. Most of these memories are optional, but some are unlocked through story progression. The player can collect badges, including several optional throughout the world, which are displayed on the cat's backpack.

The world is populated by robots, who often employ the player to locate objects that reveal more information and progress the narrative. Some robots provide optional tasks, such as Morusque, who plays songs upon being provided with music sheets found around the slums. The player can interact with most robots in the world. Stray features two types of enemies who can kill the player: Zurks, a large, mutated bacteria that can swarm and devour the cat; and Sentinels, security drones who will attempt to shoot the player upon spotting them. For a portion of the game, the player can attach a Defluxor to B-12 to destroy the Zurks, though it can only be used for a limited time before B-12 overheats and requires a brief period to cool down. The player can evade Sentinels by avoiding their sight lines, indicated by glowing lights.

== Plot ==
When a group of four stray cats trek through the ruins of an abandoned facility, one falls into a chasm leading to an unpopulated underground city, and is separated. The cat finds a lab where it helps download an artificial intelligence into the body of a small drone, which calls itself B-12. It explains it previously helped a scientist but much of its memory was corrupted and needs time to recover. B-12 promises to help the cat return to the surface and accompanies it further into the city. As they travel farther, the pair discover that, while the city is completely devoid of human life, their robotic servants, known as Companions, remain. With humans absent, the Companions have grown self-aware and have built their own society among the ruins of the city, but they likewise are trapped underground. The ruins are infested with Zurks, mutant bacteria that have evolved to devour both organic life and robots.

The pair meet Momo, a member of the Outsiders, a group of Companions dedicated to finding a way to the surface. The Outsiders help the cat and B-12 proceed to the Midtown sector of the city. There, they locate Clementine, another Outsider who plans to steal an atomic battery to power a subway train leading to the surface. The trio are caught and arrested by the Sentinels, but the cat helps them all escape prison. Clementine stays behind to distract the Sentinels while the cat and B-12 escape on the subway, which takes them to the city control center. B-12 finally recovers all of its memories. It reveals that it was originally a human scientist who attempted to upload their own consciousness into a robot body, but the process went awry until the cat arrived. B-12 remembers that the city, Walled City 99, was built to shelter humanity from a catastrophe on the surface, but a plague eventually wiped out the entire human population. Realising humanity's legacy now lies with the Companions and the cat, B-12 sacrifices itself to override the city's network. This opens the blast doors over the city, exposing it to sunlight which kills the Zurks and deactivates the Sentinels. With the main exit unsealed, the cat leaves the city and reaches the surface, sniffing the air. As the cat leaves, a screen near the exit flickers and activates.

== Development ==
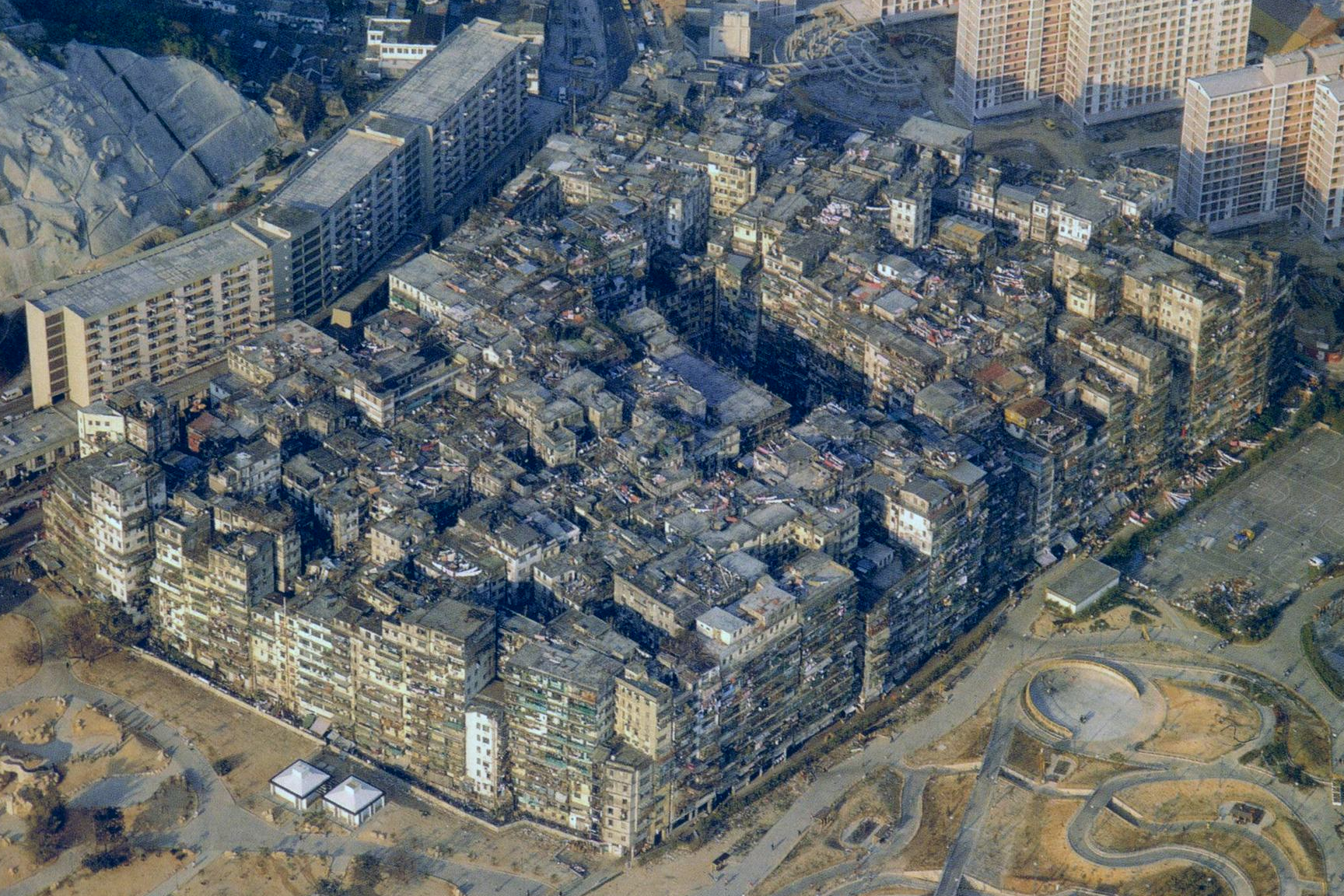
Stray was influenced aesthetically by Kowloon Walled City, which the developers considered the "perfect playground for a cat".

BlueTwelve Studio founders Koola and Viv began working on Stray in 2015 as they wanted to pursue an independent project after working at Ubisoft Montpellier. They maintained a development blog for the game, then known as HK Project. After seeing footage on Twitter, Annapurna Interactive reached out in April 2016 to publish the project; Koola and Viv had only developed some early scenes but had a strong direction for the final project. Annapurna, which had not published any games by the time the deal was formed, assisted in building the company over the years, providing occasional feedback but largely leaving creative freedom to the developers. Funding for the studio was confirmed in April 2017, and the development team grew to five by the end of 2017. From early in development, Koola and Viv knew they wanted to maintain a small team of developers, as they prefer working with direct communication. The small team meant the game's scope reduced over time, with focus directed towards elements the developers considered important. After revealing the game, the team wanted to focus on production and only begin marketing when development was nearing completion; they found the reception to the reveal added to the pressure of delivering a polished experience.

Stray was heavily influenced aesthetically by Kowloon Walled City; Koola and Viv liked the city's organic construction, and found it interesting to approach as artists. They designed some graphical tests of the environments and buildings, and found the city was the "perfect playground for a cat" due to the various paths and views. The development team found gameplay as a cat led to interesting level design opportunities, particularly regarding platforming and puzzle elements. They encountered artistic and technical challenges in balancing interesting game design with the open world, as typically decorative items—such as pipes and air conditioning units—are explorable paths in Stray. The in-game location Antvillage allowed the team to experiment with vertical game design and provide several path options for the player. The team decided to avoid standard platforming challenges early in development, after watching players consistently miss jumps, which they thought "didn't feel cat-like". According to producer Swann Martin-Raget, the movements of a cat feel smoother, which led the team to create its guided movement system while still allowing for freedom of choice. The team found the DualSense controller's sounds and vibrations added to the physicality and interactivity of playing as a cat, and the low camera angle led to deeper observation of the environment than a human protagonist.

Contrasting elements were important to the developers, such as the "small, organic, and lively" cat contrasted against the "angular and bold" robots. Viv initially created some human non-player characters, but was unsatisfied with the result and realised the high visual quality required would be too time-consuming with a smaller team. After experimenting with robots, they found them easier to place within scenes, and enjoyed the contrast with the cat. The inclusion of robots inspired more of the story, and the team found it fitting because of their fascination with films like Blade Runner (1982). The robots' language printed throughout the world was added to make players feel as though they were in a foreign location; its inclusion led to the development of the world's backstory. B-12 was added as the cat's companion to add additional abilities for the player, such as interacting with technology. Both B-12 and the cat's backpack were conceived early in development, when the game was still known as HK Project.

The gameplay experience was specifically inspired by the founders' cats, Murtaugh and Riggs, and the studio's in-house cats, Oscar and Jun. Murtaugh, a former stray cat found under a car in Montpellier, was the primary inspiration for the protagonist, while Oscar, a furless Sphynx, provided effective reference for animation. The cat animator, Miko, studied several images and videos of cats for research, and worked with cat programmer Rémi Bismuth to find a balance between smooth animations and enjoyable gameplay. Most of the team own cats, providing consistent inspiration and reference material. When the office cats began reacting to and interacting with the in-game cat, the team figured their choices had been successful. While the game is a "love letter" to the team's cats, they intentionally avoided making a simulator game, opting for interesting gameplay over complete realism. The action sequences were added to provide some stress to the player, and the team wanted to build a rhythm to maintain the story's progression. The sequence in which the player can kill the Zurks was seen as revenge by Koola and Viv for a bedbug infestation they underwent. The user interface was kept minimal, with directions integrated in the game world to guide the player. The game uses Unreal Engine 4.

== Release ==
Stray was announced at PlayStation's Future of Gaming event on 11 June 2020, in development for PlayStation 4, PlayStation 5, and Windows. In a January 2021 Consumer Electronics Show trailer, the release window was printed as October 2021, which was later removed. In July 2021, an early 2022 release window was revealed in a new gameplay trailer, but the game was delayed to a mid-year release in April 2022. During PlayStation's State of Play presentation in June, the release date was announced as 19 July 2022. At launch, it became available for PlayStation Plus's Extra, Deluxe, and Premium tier members. Stray achieved the highest number of players on PlayStation Plus in the twelve months following the service's June 2022 rebranding; it was removed in July 2023, and released as a monthly game to subscribers in November 2025.

Highly anticipated following its announcement, the game topped Steam's wishlist charts before release, broke Annapurna Interactive's record for concurrent Steam players upon release, with over 62,000 players, and became the platform's highest user-rated game of the year. In July, it was the most-downloaded PlayStation 4 and PlayStation 5 game in North America, and the second-most PlayStation 5 and third-most PlayStation 4 in Europe; in August, it was the fifth-most PlayStation 5 and sixth-most PlayStation 4 game in North America, and the fifth-most on both platforms in Europe; and in September, it ranked 19th on PlayStation 5 in Europe. Videos of cats watching footage of Stray went viral, with the dedicated Twitter account @CatsWatchStray garnering over 32,000 followers. Several players inserted their own pets into the game via modding.

Annapurna partnered with charities to raise money for homeless cats by providing giveaways as donation incentives. Two physical versions were released by iam8bit and Skybound Games: the retail version for PlayStation 5 on 20 September, featuring six art cards; and the Exclusive Edition for PlayStation 4 and PlayStation 5 on 12 December, with an additional poster and embroidered patch. A vinyl record of the soundtrack was released in May 2023 by iam8bit, with album art by Fernando Correa. In June 2023, Annapurna announced the game was in development for Xbox One and Xbox Series X and Series S, which was released on 10 August, and for macOS (compatible with Apple M series devices), released on 5 December. During a Nintendo Direct presentation in June 2024, Annapurna announced a Nintendo Switch version, which was released on 19 November; a Nintendo Switch 2 version was announced in April 2026 and released on 28 May. The cat and B-12 are available as a collectible "Bot" in Astro Bot (2024).

== Reception ==
=== Critical response ===
Reception

Aggregate scores
| Aggregator | Score |
|---|---|
| Metacritic | 83/100 (PS5 & XBSX); 82/100 (PC); 80/100 (NS) |
| OpenCritic | 85% recommend |

Review scores
| Publication | Score |
|---|---|
| Electronic Gaming Monthly | 4/5 |
| Famitsu | 36/40 |
| Game Informer | 8/10 |
| GameSpot | 9/10 |
| GamesRadar+ | 4.5/5 |
| IGN | 8/10 |
| Jeuxvideo.com | 15/20 |
| PC Gamer (US) | 82/100 |
| PCGamesN | 9/10 |
| The Guardian | 5/5 |
| Video Games Chronicle | 5/5 |

Stray received "generally favorable" reviews, according to review aggregator Metacritic, and 85% of critics recommended the game according to OpenCritic. In Japan, four critics from Famitsu gave the game a total score of 36 out of 40, with one critic awarding the game a perfect 10. Chris Scullion of Video Games Chronicle (VGC) considered it one of Annapurna Interactive's best releases, and Andrew Webster of The Verge named it among the best games of the year to date. VG247's Kelsey Raynor described it as "a touching tale of loss, loneliness, environmental destruction", and Ars Technica's Sam Machkovech declared it a blend of the "eerie, atmospheric exploration" of Half-Life (1998) and the "childlike whimsy of a classic Studio Ghibli film".

Critics praised the graphical quality and art design, especially the use of lighting. The Washington Post's Alyse Stanley described Stray as "a master class in environmental story telling and level design", lauding the subtle directions provided to the player. Shacknews's Bill Lavoy found the world among the most beautifully-designed, praising the detail but criticising the lack of graphical settings. Kotaku's Ari Notis likened the cinematic cutscenes to games by prestigious studios like Naughty Dog. GamesRadar+'s Sam Loveridge found the atmosphere unique among recent releases, describing the world as "a stunning place to just exist in", and Push Square's Stephen Tailby wrote it conveys an atmosphere of melancholy and hope. Wired's Will Bedingfield lauded the imitation of Kowloon Walled City; GameBonfire's Qinyachanghui thought it faithfully restored the city's dark, crowded atmosphere with its compact buildings and makeshift rooms, evoking a surreal feeling through its interplay of the lower-class environment and the nightlife's neon lights. NME's Jordan Oloman considered the worldbuilding the strongest element, though noted it failed to match Nier: Automata's (2017) intelligence or subtlety. VentureBeat's Rachel Kaser found the Zurk-infested levels the worst visually, and some reviewers noted minor glitches. The A.V. Club's William Hughes considered the robot-populated underground city concept a "Lego stack of ready-made video game tropes". Kotaku's Sisi Jiang found Stray a troubling example of techno-orientalism.

The graphical quality and art design of Stray received acclaim from critics, several of whom particularly lauded its use of lighting.

Rock Paper Shotgun's Katharine Castle determined that "at least 50% of the appeal" was playing as a cat. The realistic recreation of cat behaviour received widespread praise; critics lauded the animation and easy controls and the immersion of movement and navigation, though some noted occasionally awkward controls and camera angles. VG247's Raynor was prepared for repetitive gameplay but ultimately found it maintained consistent enjoyment. The Guardian's Keza MacDonald considered Stray "an excellent example of how a change of perspective can enliven a fictional setting to which we've become habituated". VGC's Scullion found the platforming simple but effective, and GameSpot's Alessandro Barbosa commended the balanced pacing between gameplay sequences. Jeuxvideo.com's Pauline Leclercq felt the puzzles generally lacked difficulty but improved in the second half, while The A.V. Club's Hughes found them repetitive over time. PCMag's Gabriel Zamora was disappointed by the lack of choice while platforming, and Electronic Gaming Monthly's Josh Harmon considered the core gameplay loop of objectives and puzzles "distinctly uncatlike".

Hardcore Gamer's Kyle LeClair felt Stray has "a terrific story with profound themes to uncover and great emotional beats along the way". Several reviewers were surprised by the narrative themes, considering the basic gameplay concept: The Washington Post's Stanley found them memorable, and Game Informer's Blake Hester considered them simple but effective. The Verge's Webster recognised "themes ranging from wealth inequality to environmental disaster" and found the ending to be tragic and beautiful. GameSpot's Barbosa similarly found the ending satisfying, noting it allowed reflection on the character relationships. Polygon's Alexis Ong identified themes related to the ongoing democratic development in Hong Kong, particularly regarding police brutality and the 2019–2020 protests, citing the working title HK Project. Reviewers lauded the robot characters in the game world, described by PCGamesN's Nat Smith as "whimsical and strikingly human". Loveridge of GamesRadar+ felt the interactions directed the narrative, which itself touched on themes of hardship and friendship. Raynor of VG247 similarly found the friendships effective and emotional and several reviewers felt strongly about the protagonist and B-12. In the Journal of Games Criticism, Caighlan Smith argued that, despite its nonhuman perspective, Stray reinforced neoliberal, human-centered ideals of individuality shaped by capitalism.

The original score received praise, and was described as among the year's best by Ars Technica's Machkovech, who compared it favourably to Half-Life. VGC's Scullion wrote the score "knows exactly when to evoke awe, when to creep the player out, and when to pluck at our pesky human heartstrings". Kotaku's Notis called it "deliciously jazzy", and Jeuxvideo.com's Leclercq found it appropriate within the game world. Hardcore Gamer's LeClair and Shacknews's Lavoy appreciated the environmental melodies, including those played by the robot Morusque, and some on the in-game radio. Smith of PCGamesN described the music as "gently optimistic and abruptly unsettling", lauding the seamless switching between tracks dependent on the gameplay.

The combat sequences polarised critics; some found them tense and exciting, while others found them tiresome and less interesting than its other elements. The gameplay sequences involving Zurks—compared by several critics to the headcrabs from the Half-Life series—were positively described as "more authentically cat" by Electronic Gaming Monthly's Harmon, while GamesRadar+'s Loveridge found they added balance to the calmer moments. The Escapist's Damien Lawardorn found the sequences an effective example of body horror, and among the most compelling and effective chapters. Webster of The Verge similarly felt they added necessary tension, likening them to the swarms of A Plague Tale: Innocence (2019), but wrote they could become frustrating. This sentiment was echoed by IGN's Tom Marks and PC Gamer's Jon Bailes, the latter of whom described a confrontation as "repeated backpedalling and shooting". NME's Oloman considered the sequences a vast difference from the rest of the game, and Game Informer's Hester found them monotonous, though appreciated their rarity. The stealth mechanics received similarly polarised responses: PC Gamer's Bailes found them entertaining, while they were described by PCMag's Zamora as sufficient but simplistic, and by Vice's Renata Price as ranging "from fine to frustrating".

=== Accolades ===
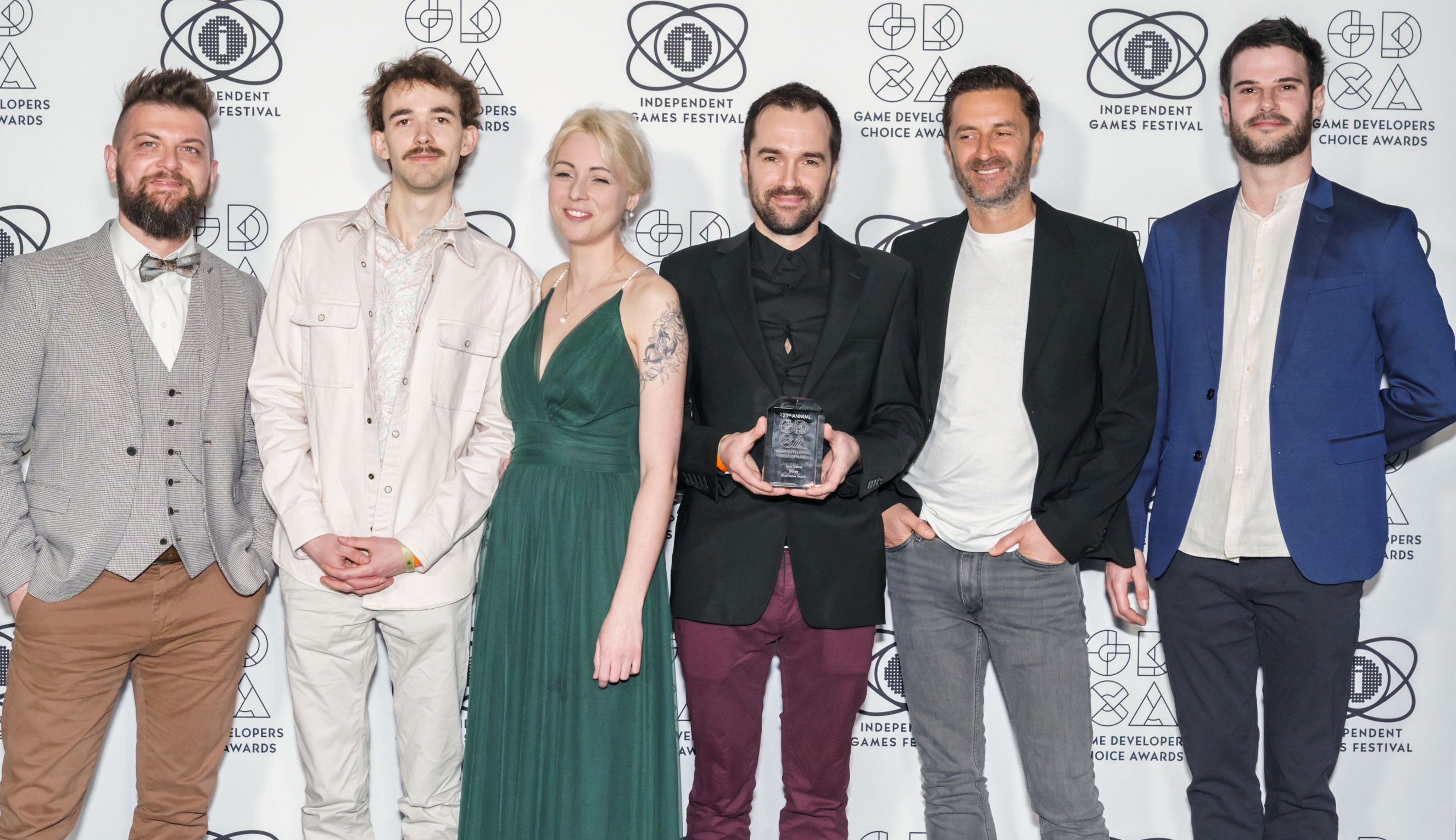
Stray won Best Debut at the 23rd Game Developers Choice Awards. Hover over image: Point to identify the person.

Stray won PlayStation Game of the Year at the 40th Golden Joystick Awards and Most Innovative Gameplay at The Steam Awards. It was nominated for six awards at the Game Awards 2022, including Game of the Year and Best Game Direction; it won Best Independent Game and Best Debut Indie Game. From PlayStation Blog, Stray won Best Independent Game of the Year and ranked fourth for Best Art Direction, Best Use of DualSense, PS4 Game of the Year, and PS5 Game of the Year, while the cat was runner-up for Best New Character. It was nominated for Game of the Year, Adventure Game of the Year, and Outstanding Achievement in Art Direction at the 26th Annual D.I.C.E. Awards.

Stray won Best Sound Design for an Indie Game at the 21st Annual Game Audio Network Guild Awards, and the Gayming Magazine Readers' Award at the Gayming Awards 2023. It led the nominees of the 23rd Game Developers Choice Awards with six nominations (tied with Elden Ring), including Game of the Year, and won Best Debut. It had nine nominations at the 19th British Academy Games Awards, including Best Game, and was nominated for Best Game Writing at the 58th Annual Nebula Awards. The game appeared on multiple publications' year-end lists of 2022, including PCGamesN (2nd), GamesRadar+ (3rd), The Guardian (4th), Time (5th), Empire (7th), Vulture (7th), Digital Trends (8th), GQ (10th), Den of Geek (11th), and The Washington Post.

| Award | Date | Category | Result | Ref. |
|---|---|---|---|---|
| British Academy Games Awards | 30 March 2023 | Best Game | Nominated | |
| British Academy Games Awards | 30 March 2023 | Animation | Nominated | |
| British Academy Games Awards | 30 March 2023 | Audio Achievement | Nominated | |
| British Academy Games Awards | 30 March 2023 | Debut Game | Nominated | |
| British Academy Games Awards | 30 March 2023 | Music | Nominated | |
| British Academy Games Awards | 30 March 2023 | Narrative | Nominated | |
| British Academy Games Awards | 30 March 2023 | Original Property | Nominated | |
| British Academy Games Awards | 30 March 2023 | Technical Achievement | Nominated | |
| British Academy Games Awards | 30 March 2023 | EE Game of the Year | Nominated | |
| D.I.C.E. Awards | 23 February 2023 | Game of the Year | Nominated | |
| D.I.C.E. Awards | 23 February 2023 | Adventure Game of the Year | Nominated | |
| D.I.C.E. Awards | 23 February 2023 | Outstanding Achievement in Art Direction | Nominated | |
| Game Audio Network Guild Awards | 23 March 2023 | Best Sound Design for an Indie Game | Won | |
| Game Developers Choice Awards | 22 March 2023 | Best Debut | Won | |
| Game Developers Choice Awards | 22 March 2023 | Game of the Year | Nominated | |
| Game Developers Choice Awards | 22 March 2023 | Best Audio | Nominated | |
| Game Developers Choice Awards | 22 March 2023 | Best Design | Nominated | |
| Game Developers Choice Awards | 22 March 2023 | Innovation Award | Nominated | |
| Game Developers Choice Awards | 22 March 2023 | Best Visual Art | Nominated | |
| Game Developers Choice Awards | 22 March 2023 | Best Technology | Honorable Mention | |
| Golden Joystick Awards | 22 November 2022 | PlayStation Game of the Year | Won | |
| The Game Awards | 8 December 2022 | Best Independent Game | Won | |
| The Game Awards | 8 December 2022 | Best Debut Indie Game | Won | |
| The Game Awards | 8 December 2022 | Game of the Year | Nominated | |
| The Game Awards | 8 December 2022 | Best Game Direction | Nominated | |
| The Game Awards | 8 December 2022 | Best Art Direction | Nominated | |
| The Game Awards | 8 December 2022 | Best Action/Adventure Game | Nominated | |
| Nebula Awards | 14 May 2023 | Best Game Writing | Nominated | |
| The Steam Awards | 3 January 2023 | Most Innovative Gameplay | Won | |
| The Steam Awards | 3 January 2023 | Game of the Year | Nominated | |

== Film adaptation ==
On 5 September 2023, Annapurna Animation announced an animated feature film adaptation of Stray is in development after the success of its first film Nimona (2023). Robert Baird, co-head of animation, felt the game was suitable for adaptation due to its popularity, as well as its buddy comedy and hopepunk elements.
