= Immortality (video game) =

- Developer: Sam Barlow
- Publisher: Half Mermaid Productions
- Director: Sam Barlow
- Producers: Natalie Watson; Jeff Petriello; Shyam S. Sengupta
- Programmer: Connor Carson
- Writers: Sam Barlow; Amelia Gray; Allan Scott; Barry Gifford
- Composer: Nainita Desai
- Engine: Unity
- Platforms: Windows; Xbox Series X/S; Android; iOS; macOS; PlayStation 5
- Release: Windows, Xbox Series X/S; 30 August 2022; Android, iOS; 16 November 2022; macOS; 5 April 2023; PlayStation 5; 23 January 2024
- Genre: Interactive film
- Mode: Single-player

Immortality is a 2022 interactive film video game developed by Sam Barlow and published by Half Mermaid Productions. It was released for Windows and Xbox Series X/S in August, while Android and iOS versions were released via Netflix in November 2022. A macOS version was released in April 2023. A port for PlayStation 5 was released in January 2024.

== Gameplay ==
The game is based on the fictional model turned actress Marissa Marcel (Manon Gage) who had starred in three movies from 1968, 1970, and 1999 but which were never released. Marcel has since gone missing, creating a mystery for the player to solve. In the same manner as Barlow's prior works Her Story and Telling Lies, Immortality incorporates the use of full-motion video for the player to piece together Marcel's fate. The player begins with one clip from one of the three films, and the player can pause and click on a person or item of interest. The game will then show all other clips from the three films, as well as behind-the-scenes production footage and television and interview clips, which the player can review and seek out further persons or items.

== Plot ==
The game is presented as a compilation of previously lost found footage of the filmography of actress Marissa Marcel as well as associated promotional and behind-the-scenes material. Much of the plot is shown through secret footage the player reveals by manipulating the footage from the films, TV interviews, etc.; because of this, the plot progresses in a non-chronological, broken narrative format. This synopsis follows chronological order.

Two immortal beings, "The One" and "The Other", predate humanity and are able to live indefinitely by taking on the forms of humans and living their lives. This ostensibly ends the human's life, though elements of their personalities and memories mingle with the beings' own personalities and memories. Their kind's numbers have dwindled since human civilization began. They can regenerate from being killed, though some methods, especially burning, are implied to be physically permanent.

The One is fascinated with humanity, particularly their proclivities for sex, violence, and art. The Other is ambivalent toward Humanity, seeing them as inferior copies of the immortal beings, and believes that the immortals and humans should exist separate from each other. However, they indulge The One in their exploration of humanity.

The One becomes Marissa Marcel, a French girl who is implied to have been mortally wounded by German soldiers in World War II and absorbed by The One as a mercy. In 1968 she auditions and is awarded a role in Ambrosio, a film based on the gothic novel The Monk by Matthew Lewis. During filming she becomes romantically involved with director of photography John Durick. The film's director, Arthur Fischer, steals the negatives, which prevents the film from ever being released.

Two years later, John directs Minsky, a detective story set in New York City's avant-garde art world. Marissa is lead and co-writer. Midway through production, The Other takes over the form of lead actor Carl Greenwood. While filming a scene, Marissa shoots and kills Carl with a prop gun at point blank range. To the rest of the cast and crew, this appears to be a tragic accident; the truth is that The One intentionally killed The Other due to their growing rift over The One's fascination with human creativity. The One also has The Other's body cremated, which both believe is the only way to kill an immortal permanently. Carl's death causes filming to halt, and the film is never released. Marissa reveals to John her and Carl's true natures as immortals, and that she killed Carl. John is horrified by this, which disappoints The One. They kill John and takes on his form, shedding Marissa's form. The general public assumes Marissa became a recluse.

Nearly 30 years later, Fischer gives the negatives from Ambrosio to John in an attempt to free himself from deathbed regrets. The nostalgia causes The One to remember Marissa fondly and take on her form simultaneously with John's form, essentially existing in two bodies at once. Meanwhile, actress Amy Archer watches footage of Carl's death, which allows The Other to take her form. The Other reconciles with The One, now aware of cinema's ability to give them true immortality. John, Marissa, and Amy begin work on a new film, Two of Everything, where pop star Maria allows her coincidentally-identical body double Heather to take her place at a billionaire's birthday party. John directs and Marissa plays both Maria and Heather (paralleling The One's attempt to exist as two people). Amy plays the billionaire's wife who has Heather murdered, thinking she is Maria, to cover up an attempted rape by her husband. During filming, Marissa is sometimes unresponsive and suffers nosebleeds, and both she and John occasionally collapse in exhaustion. John is frequently absent during filming, implying that he vanishes when The One cannot maintain both forms. Amy pleads with Marissa to take breaks, but Marissa rebuffs her concerns. In the movie's last-filmed scene, Marissa spontaneously bleeds from her head. The One asks the Other to help her die onscreen as The Other did, and therefore become truly immortalized in film. Amy films herself burning an inert Marissa's body. Two of Everything never finishes filming.

The grid containing the clips they've collected during the game slowly disappears, revealing the face of The One. They tell the player they are "part of you, now," implying the player is their new host.

== Cast ==
- Manon Gage as Marissa Marcel
- Hans Christopher as John Durick
- John Earl Robinson as Arthur Fischer
- Cesar D' La Torre as Fabio 2nd Camera Assistant
- Jocelin Donahue as Amy Archer
- Charlotta Mohlin as The One
- Timothy Lee Depriest as The Other
- Ty Molbak as Carl Greenwood
- Katarina Morhacova as Diane Willis
- Michael Otis as Andrew Hessenberg
- Jascha Slesers as Sofia Morgana
- Brooke Anne Smith as Agnes/ Jane Smith
- Justin Sorvillo as Artist
- Miles Szanto as Robert Jones
- Daniel V. Graulau as Detective Walker
- Eric Evans as Eddie
- Julian Goza as Monk

== Development ==
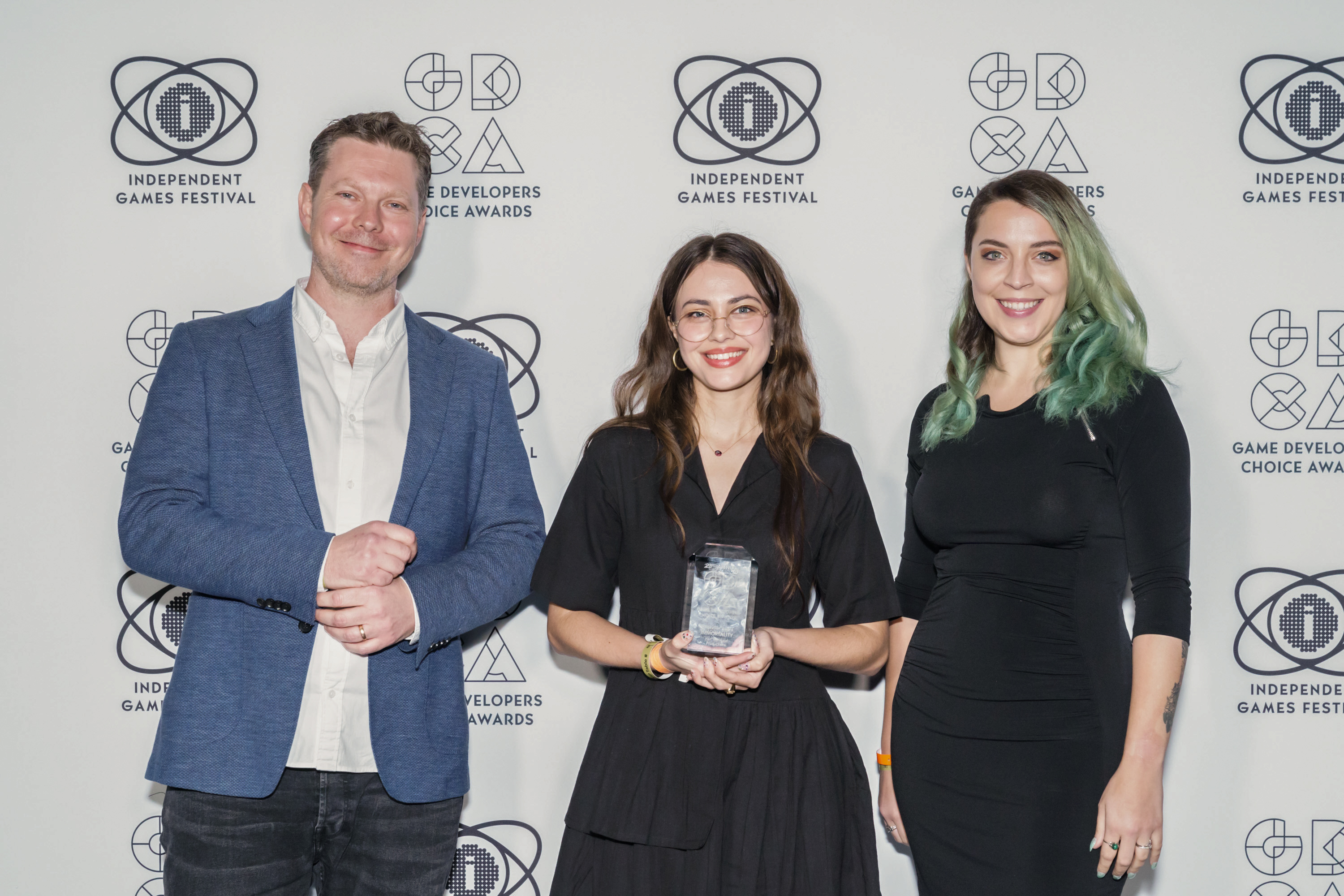
Barlow, Natalie Watson and Connor Carson receiving the Innovation Award for Immortality at GDC 2023

Barlow had announced Immortality as "Project Ambrosio" in 2020 and had blogged about its development over the year. His writing suggested that the game may have more of a horror-themed nature than his previous games, along with several passages marked as if classified or redacted information. Barlow brought on three additional screenwriters for the game: Allan Scott, Amelia Gray, and Barry Gifford.

Casting for the game took place over Zoom in early 2021. It had been Manon Gage's first role in three years since graduating from the Juilliard School. Filming for the three film-themed scripts was done chronologically and covered 400 pages. It was shot over a 10 week period in Arts District, Los Angeles around August 2021.

The game was formally announced during the E3 2021 event in June that year for Microsoft Windows, iOS, and Android. In March 2022, Half Mermaid Productions announced that a version for Xbox Series X/S would also be available at launch. During PC Gaming Show 2022, it was announced that the game would release on 26 July 2022, but was later delayed to 30 August 2022. In August 2022, it was announced that the mobile ports would be published by Netflix.

== Release ==
Immortality premiered at the Tribeca Film Festival in June 2022. It was subsequently released on August 30, 2022 on Xbox Series X/S, Xbox Game Pass, and Windows via Steam and GOG. It released on Netflix via Google Play and iOS in November 2022.

== Reception ==
Reception

Aggregate score
| Aggregator | Score |
|---|---|
| Metacritic | PC: 87/100; XSXS: 88/100 |

Review scores
| Publication | Score |
|---|---|
| Adventure Gamers | 4.5/5 |
| Destructoid | 9/10 |
| Edge | 10/10 |
| Electronic Gaming Monthly | 4/5 |
| Eurogamer | Recommended |
| GameSpot | 8/10 |
| GamesRadar+ | 4.5/5 |
| IGN | 8/10 |
| PC Gamer (US) | 95/100 |
| The Telegraph | 4/5 |
| The Guardian | 5/5 |
| VG247 | 4/5 |

Immortality received "generally favorable" reviews according to review aggregator Metacritic.

In an early review due to its print format, Edge awarded Immortality a perfect 10/10 score, the 24th game in its history to do so.

In addition, Immortality has been praised for its acting performances, notably that of Manon Gage, who has received critical acclaim for her performance as Marissa Marcel. Edge called her performance "outstanding." Vulture's Lewis Gordon called it "a knockout performance." PJ O'Reilly of Pure Xbox said Gage "provides a core performance that marks her out as an absolute superstar in the making." Vice's Cameron Kunzelman noted: "...watching Gage play Marcel playing these characters is like watching someone juggle while riding a unicycle in the middle of the Indy 500, and she does it perfectly and without breaking a sweat. It's really something."

Charlotta Mohlin has also been praised for her performance, with Edge calling her "remarkable", and Tristan Ogilvie of IGN calling her "spellbinding." Well Played AU's James Wood said "[Mohlin's] work is something I will be thinking about for years to come."

=== Awards ===
| Year | Award | Category | Result | Ref. |
|---|---|---|---|---|
| 2022 | Golden Joystick Awards | Best Performer (Manon Gage) | Won | |
| 2022 | Golden Joystick Awards | Ultimate Game of the Year | Nominated | |
| 2022 | Golden Joystick Awards | Best Storytelling | Nominated | |
| 2022 | The Game Awards 2022 | Best Performance (Manon Gage) | Nominated | |
| 2022 | The Game Awards 2022 | Best Narrative | Nominated | |
| 2022 | The Game Awards 2022 | Best Game Direction | Nominated | |
| 2023 | Society of Composers & Lyricists Awards | Outstanding Original Score for Interactive Media | Nominated | |
| 2023 | New York Game Awards | Big Apple Award for Best Game of the Year | Nominated | |
| 2023 | New York Game Awards | Off Broadway Award for Best Indie Game | Nominated | |
| 2023 | New York Game Awards | Herman Melville Award for Best Writing in a Game | Nominated | |
| 2023 | New York Game Awards | Great White Way Award for Best Acting in a Game (Manon Gage) | Won | |
| 2023 | 26th Annual D.I.C.E. Awards | Mobile Game of the Year | Nominated | |
| 2023 | 26th Annual D.I.C.E. Awards | Outstanding Achievement for an Independent Game | Nominated | |
| 2023 | 26th Annual D.I.C.E. Awards | Outstanding Achievement in Game Direction | Nominated | |
| 2023 | 26th Annual D.I.C.E. Awards | Outstanding Achievement in Story | Nominated | |
| 2023 | 23rd Game Developers Choice Awards | Game of the Year | Nominated | |
| 2023 | 23rd Game Developers Choice Awards | Best Design | Honorable mention | |
| 2023 | 23rd Game Developers Choice Awards | Innovation Award | Won | |
| 2023 | 23rd Game Developers Choice Awards | Best Narrative | Nominated | |
| 2023 | 23rd Game Developers Choice Awards | Best Technology | Honorable mention | |
| 2023 | Independent Games Festival | Seumas McNally Grand Prize | Nominated | |
| 2023 | Independent Games Festival | Excellence in Audio | Honorable mention | |
| 2023 | Independent Games Festival | Excellence in Narrative | Won | |
| 2023 | 19th British Academy Games Awards | Artistic Achievement | Nominated | |
| 2023 | 19th British Academy Games Awards | Narrative | Won | |
| 2023 | 19th British Academy Games Awards | Performer in a Leading Role (Manon Gage) | Nominated | |
| 2023 | 19th British Academy Games Awards | Performer in a Supporting Role (Charlotta Mohlin) | Nominated | |
| 2023 | 19th British Academy Games Awards | Technical Achievement | Nominated | |
| 2023 | 19th British Academy Games Awards | EE Game of the Year | Nominated | |
