= Tunic (video game) =

2022 video game

- Developer: Isometricorp Games
- Publisher: Finji
- Designer: Andrew Shouldice
- Artist: Andrew Shouldice
- Composers: Terence Lee (Lifeformed); Janice Kwan
- Platforms: macOS; Windows; Xbox One; Xbox Series X/S; Nintendo Switch; PlayStation 4; PlayStation 5
- Release: macOS, Windows, Xbox One, Xbox Series X/S; March 16, 2022; Nintendo Switch, PlayStation 4, PlayStation 5; September 27, 2022
- Genre: Action-adventure
- Mode: Single-player

Tunic is a 2022 action-adventure game developed by Isometricorp Games and published by Finji. It is set in a ruined fantasy world, where the player controls an anthropomorphic fox on a journey to free a fox spirit trapped in a crystal. The player discovers the gameplay and setting by exploring and finding in-game pages of a manual that offers clues, drawings, and notes. The backstory is obscured; most text is given in a constructed writing system that the player is not expected to decipher. Tunic's isometric perspective hides numerous pathways and secrets.

Designer Andrew Shouldice developed Tunic, his first major game, over seven years. He began work on it as a solo project in 2015, wanting to combine challenging gameplay with gentle visual and audio design. He was inspired by his childhood experiences playing Nintendo Entertainment System games like The Legend of Zelda (1986) and trying to understand game manuals for which he lacked context. Shouldice was joined during development by composers Terence Lee and Janice Kwan, audio designer Kevin Regamey, developer Eric Billingsley, and producer Felix Kramer. Publisher Finji joined the project in 2017 and announced Tunic at E3 2017.

Tunic was released for macOS, Windows, Xbox One, and Xbox Series X/S in March 2022, followed by ports for Nintendo Switch, PlayStation 4, and PlayStation 5 in September. It received positive reviews, especially for its aesthetics, design, and gameplay, but drew some criticism for uneven difficulty and potential for players to feel stuck. Tunic won the Outstanding Achievement for an Independent Game award at the 26th Annual D.I.C.E. Awards, and the Artistic Achievement and Debut Game awards at the 19th British Academy Games Awards.

== Gameplay ==
The fox with a stick equipped and health and stamina meters in the bottom left. An enemy is chasing the fox, and a shrine is nearby.

Tunic is an action-adventure game set in the ruins of a post-apocalyptic fantasy world, in which the player character, an anthropomorphic fox, navigates the terrain and fights off hostile creatures. The player is initially given no directions or instructions, and the majority of the text is in a constructed writing system, with only some words presented in the player's selected language, such as English. The three-dimensional terrain is typically displayed from a fixed isometric view, though the perspective shifts at certain points.

The fox character moves around the world by running or dodge-rolling; after rolling, the fox can run faster until the player stops moving them. The player can freely explore the world, and there is no mandated path to follow. Although many areas require specific actions or items to enter normally, which creates a general order to the game, there are often alternate ways to gain entrance. The isometric view obscures numerous hidden paths and secrets.

The interface has meters for the fox's health, stamina, and magic. Actions such as rolling consume stamina, which replenishes after a few seconds. Scattered throughout the world are chests, which contain collectible items, weapons, or coins. Items can also be purchased with coins from ghostly merchants found in a few hidden paths. Some items, such as potions, restore the fox's attributes. Other items can be used in combination with coins to increase the fox's maximum health, stamina, or magic. Tunic does not have difficulty levels, but players can toggle unlimited stamina or health in accessibility settings.

Several types of weapons can be found in the game, including a sword, explosives, and magic items. The shield can be used to block attacks at the cost of stamina. Magic weapons can use magic to fire projectiles, slow time, or grab enemies with a lash. Bombs can be used to cause explosions or bursts of fire, which can set enemies or the fox on fire. Enemies will chase and attack the fox on sight. Defeated enemies drop coins. The player can target specific enemies to automatically direct their attacks; this also shifts the camera, which can reveal hidden passages or objects. If the fox dies, they drop some of their coins and leaves behind a spirit that can be recovered on the next playthrough to return them. The end of some areas contains a unique boss enemy, which unlike regular enemies must be defeated to progress.

Throughout the world are shrines with a large fox statue; kneeling at these restores the fox's health, but also revives any defeated enemies. When the fox dies, they are restored at the last shrine they have knelt at. Some areas also include a teleport mechanism in the form of a golden platform, which allows the fox to access a realm called the Far Shore where they can exit through another golden platform in the world.

Present throughout the world are pages of an in-game manual. When the player collects the page items, the pages are added to the manual in the interface, which the player can refer to at any time. Like the in-game text, the majority of the manual is in a constructed writing system, and the player does not encounter the pages in order. The drawings, maps, diagrams, and handwritten notes in the manual pages give clues to the player as to how the game works and where to go next, such as showing the fox offering items to a shrine, which otherwise gives no indication that it can be used that way.

== Plot ==
The plot of Tunic is revealed through gameplay, the backstory and context emerging only as the fox player character collects manual pages. This manual is written with the player as the reader. It does not explain what the fox player-character knows about the story or if they understand the constructed language.

A fox awakens on a shore, and begins to journey through the game world, which is filled with ruins. After collecting a weapon and shield and ringing two magical bells, the fox enters a temple and then a spiritual plane known as the Far Shore. There they encounter the spirit of a larger fox trapped in a crystal prison, referred to in the manual as the Heir. The fox leaves to collect the three crystal keys to the prison which can be found within dungeons across the land. If the fox is killed, the Heir revives them.

As the fox collects the crystal keys, they encounter glowing purple essence, which powers parts of the ruins, including the golden platforms, and is relayed by glowing black obelisks. While collecting the last key, the fox journeys through a mine—where purple essence seems to be taking over the world itself—into an underground factory where the souls of foxes are being forcibly confined into the obelisks. After collecting the Keys and freeing the Heir, the Heir attacks and kills the fox. The fox, now in spirit form, appears in a night-time version of the overworld, with many paths obstructed by the purple essence. Most enemies have disappeared and the land is instead populated by the souls of other foxes, who speak almost exclusively in the game's constructed writing system. The fox visits the six Graves of the Hero, which each return parts of the fox's spirit and restore them to life.

Collecting enough pages of the manual reveals that there had previously been a civilization of foxes, which looked for power from outside of reality. Seeking immortality, they found a way to entomb the souls of foxes from the past and future into obelisks as a source of power. A religion formed around the power and the Hero who found it, with the faithful exempt from their souls being used. This power was corrupted through overuse, causing the purple essence to begin to erode reality and loop time. One fox, the Heir, was trapped outside of the time loop, but acts as a beacon to draw in a replacement Heir, continuing the cycle.

If the restored fox defeats the Heir, they become imprisoned as the new Heir, and the game ends. The player is then given the options to quit, to restart from the beginning in a New Game Plus mode with most of their items, or else to restart from just before the battle. A second ending occurs instead if the player, before fighting the Heir, follows the "golden path". This requires them to collect the pages of the manual and solve the puzzle at the top of the mountain that uses the pages. Afterwards, when the player confronts the Heir, instead of fighting they show them the manual, showing how to break the cycle and freeing them. The Heir embraces the fox in gratitude, and as the credits roll the two are shown exploring the land together.

== Development ==
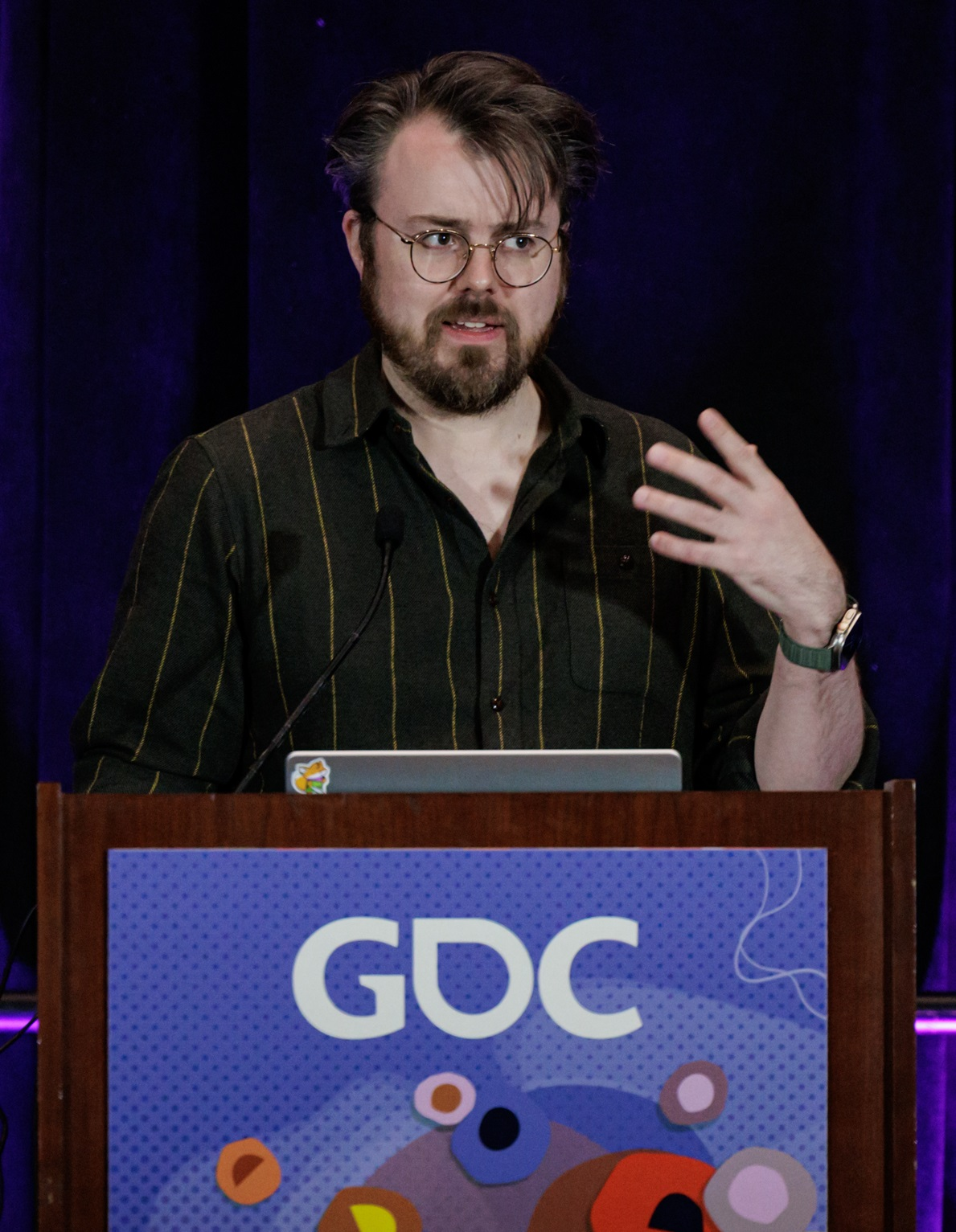
Shouldice at Game Developers Conference 2023

Andrew Shouldice began working on Tunic in February 2015, using the working title Secret Legend. Shouldice had previously worked on point-and-click adventure games at Silverback Productions and made small games for Ludum Dare competitions, but had never made a larger solo work. He wanted to make a game with open-ended exploration, and quit his job at Silverback to make the game without knowing his creative direction. He posted screenshots of his work on Twitter and Vine, attracting immediate attention. Within weeks, Shouldice developed the game's fox protagonist, isometric graphical style, and action-adventure single-player gameplay. Shouldice had initially wanted to have a human protagonist customizable by the player, but was unable to design a character model he was satisfied with; he switched to an anthropomorphic fox instead, which he says made sense because "foxes get into trouble". He decided early in development that his experience as a programmer was not enough to create all aspects of the commercial game he envisioned. At the March 2015 Game Developers Conference, he met with composer Terence Lee (Lifeformed) and audio designer Kevin Regamey of Power Up Audio, who soon became the composer and audio designer.

Shouldice wanted to combine challenging gameplay with "gentle and pleasing" visual and audio design. The colorful design was inspired by Nintendo Entertainment System games like The Legend of Zelda (1986), and was intended to inspire players to be brave and explore new areas that may be more challenging than they were ready for or which they felt they were "not supposed to be right now". He wanted players to feel "genuine discovery and mystery", both in finding parts that they did not yet understand, and also in learning things that re-contextualized previous parts. He had a design goal of adding "content for no one", meaning details and secrets that did not need to be found by all or any players to be worth including. The isometric viewpoint and style of Monument Valley (2014) also influenced Tunic's visuals.

Shouldice was inspired by the sense of mystery he had as a child when reading through game manuals such as for Metroid II: Return of Samus (1991), without being able to understand everything he was reading due to lack of reading ability or context. He wanted to give players a sense of being presented with something that has meaning, but which was not understandable by the player or necessarily meant for them. Shouldice also hoped that the mystery would encourage players to collaborate to solve puzzles and give hints to each other. These desires led to the use of the pages of the manual as a major design element, written in a constructed writing system that players were not expected or required to decipher. Fez (2012) inspired Shouldice to create the plot's dual endings, as well as to make the writing system not be a transliteration of English. He felt that because of Fez, players would immediately check if the language was a simple cipher of an existing language. He integrated a version of the manual and its pages by June 2015.

FromSoftware's Bloodborne (2015) influenced the technical combat design, with a rhythm of attacking and dodging at a quick pace. Early versions of the game mirrored the Soulslike combat more directly, but the similarity was reduced during development. The story also drew from that of Bloodborne, using the idea of worlds being corrupted by the exploitation of ancient power. Tunic also shares the exploration of a "player-ambivalent artifact" like FromSoftware's games, where the player is an insignificant character moving through a mysterious, uncaring world.

=== Announcement and release ===
After a couple years of development, Shouldice was joined by Felix Kramer, who became the producer, leading to connecting with publisher Finji in 2017. The game was announced as Tunic at the E3 2017 PC Gaming Show in June 2017, to be published by Finji with an expected release year of 2018. Finji presented the game again at the E3 2018 Xbox showcase in June of the following year, this time without a release date. Critics at the E3 presentations regarded the game positively; Giant Bomb, GamesRadar+, and Destructoid all termed it the "cutest" and most "adorable" game at the 2018 E3. At the 2021 E3 show IGN claimed it had been "a darling of the gaming scene for several years now". By 2020, Tunic's design was largely complete, and the development team expanded: Eric Billingsley, who was working on his own game partially inspired by Tunic, joined as a developer and level designer; Terence Lee, who had been intermittently composing music for the project for five years, was joined by his wife Janice Kwan. Allowing the fox's personality to remain undefined, the pair of composers strove to make an "atmospheric" soundtrack that was more connected to the setting than the fox. Artist ma-ko created the artwork in the in-game manual.

The release date was announced at The Game Awards in December 2021, and it launched for macOS, Microsoft Windows, Xbox One, and Xbox Series X/S on March 16, 2022, with ports for Nintendo Switch, PlayStation 4, and PlayStation 5 following on September 27, under the studio name Isometricorp Games. The ports were completed with assistance by 22nd Century Toys. A digital album of music from the game, Tunic Original Soundtrack, was released by the composers on March 16 alongside the game. A second digital album containing "initial piano concepts" of some of the tracks, Tunic (Piano Sketches), was released on September 22, 2023. Shouldice has said that the game took longer than expected because it followed an iterative model of development, wherein he redesigned and redeveloped nearly every element "at least once or twice" as he became more experienced as a developer and revised the design. Lee and Billingsley instead felt that Tunic's scale and complexity made it difficult for a smaller team to produce in a short amount of time.

== Reception ==
Reception

Aggregate score
Aggregator	Score
Metacritic	(NS) 88/100 (PC) 85/100 (PS5) 86/100 (XSXS) 86/100

Review scores
Publication	Score
Destructoid	9/10
Game Informer	9.75/10
GameSpot	9/10
IGN	9/10
Jeuxvideo.com	17/20
PC Gamer (US)	86/100

Tunic received "generally favorable reviews", according to the review aggregator Metacritic. It was ranked as one of the top 30 games of 2022 by aggregated score for Windows, Xbox Series X/S, and PlayStation 5, and the eighth-highest scored Switch game. Tunic was featured in several game of the year lists for 2022, including overall game of the year by VG247 and indie game of the year by Shacknews.

Critics highly praised the gameplay, though some aspects had a mixed reception. Several reviewers described the combat as challenging but satisfying; 'Indee' of Jeuxvideo.com concluded that Shouldice had tried and succeeded to make the game difficult enough to make the player feel unwelcome in the world. Anne-Marie Coyle of PC Gamer and Ryan McCaffrey of IGN also liked the boss battles, and PC Gamer considered them even better than the rest of combat, though Jill Grodt of Game Informer and Brendan Caldwell of Rock Paper Shotgun felt that they were too difficult compared to the rest of the game. Game Informer, along with Richard Wakeling of GameSpot and the reviewer from Jeuxvideo, applauded the accessibility options to make combat easier as allowing players to continue exploring without being restricted by the combat. Reviewers in general described the game as a mix between the gameplay of Zelda and Soulslike games or as a tribute to those games, though Zoey Handley of Destructoid and Christian Donlan of Eurogamer went further to describe it as based on an understanding of what gameplay design worked for those games rather than just a copy.

Tunic's plot received mixed opinions from reviewers. Handley applauded the way the story was told without words, and Jeuxvideo's reviewer found the ending interesting. The IGN and PC Gamer reviewers found the plot interesting but secondary to the rest of the game, Coyle of PC Gamer concluding that it was "a nice addition rather than a compelling reason to play".

Reviewers also praised the graphics and aesthetics. Grodt of Game Informer and Wakeling of GameSpot described the art style as "simple-but-beautiful", the GameSpot reviewer terming it an "extravagant diorama". The reviewers from IGN, PC Gamer, and Jeuxvideo praised the colorful and "delightful" art style, Jeuxvideo concluding that it was a very successful art direction that resulted in a beautiful and mysterious universe. Game Informer, IGN, and Jeuxvideo also said the music was beautiful and serene, Game Informer adding that it made "an intriguing contrast to the tough battles".

The exploration and secrets were well regarded; Game Informer's Grodt concluded that "Tunic's fighting is great, but discovery and exploration might be its most impressive elements". Critics highlighted the exploration and finding secrets as the core, Nicole Carpenter of Polygon describing it as pushing the player to "have the courage just to try". The puzzles, especially the use of the manual, were listed as especially worthy of praise, GameSpot calling them "utterly fantastic", a sentiment echoed by Eurogamer, Jeuxvideo, Rock Paper Shotgun, and Game Informer. Jeuxvideo, Rock Paper Shotgun, and Game Informer's reviewers felt that the obscure and challenging nature of the puzzles meant that players could feel stuck, particularly near the end.

=== Awards ===
Tunic won the Outstanding Achievement for an Independent Game award at the 26th Annual D.I.C.E. Awards, and the Artistic Achievement and Debut Game awards at the 19th British Academy Games Awards. It was also nominated for several other categories at those awards ceremonies, as well as for categories at other awards such as The Game Awards 2022, the 40th Golden Joystick Awards, the 23rd Game Developers Choice Awards, and the 21st Independent Games Festival Awards.

Awards and nominations
Award	Category	Result	Ref.
40th Golden Joystick Awards	Best Indie Game	Nominated	
The Game Awards 2022	Best Independent Game	Nominated	
The Game Awards 2022	Best Action/Adventure Game	Nominated	
The Game Awards 2022	Best Debut Indie Game	Nominated	
26th Annual D.I.C.E. Awards	Adventure Game of the Year	Nominated	
26th Annual D.I.C.E. Awards	Outstanding Achievement for an Independent Game	Won	
26th Annual D.I.C.E. Awards	Outstanding Achievement in Game Direction	Nominated	
26th Annual D.I.C.E. Awards	Outstanding Achievement in Game Design	Nominated	
23rd Game Developers Choice Awards	Game of the Year	Nominated	
23rd Game Developers Choice Awards	Best Visual Art	Honorable mention	
23rd Game Developers Choice Awards	Best Design	Nominated	
23rd Game Developers Choice Awards	Best Debut	Nominated	
23rd Game Developers Choice Awards	Best Audio	Honorable mention	
21st Independent Games Festival Awards	Seumas McNally Grand Prize	Nominated	
21st Independent Games Festival Awards	Excellence in Visual Arts	Nominated	
21st Independent Games Festival Awards	Excellence in Audio	Nominated	
19th British Academy Games Awards	Artistic Achievement	Won	
19th British Academy Games Awards	Audio Achievement	Nominated	
19th British Academy Games Awards	Debut Game	Won	
19th British Academy Games Awards	Game Design	Nominated	
19th British Academy Games Awards	Music	Nominated	
