= Before I Forget (video game) =

- Developer: 3-Fold Games
- Publisher: 3-Fold Games (Note: Console version published by Plug In Digital)
- Designer: Chella Ramanan
- Programmer: Claire Morwood
- Artist: Claire Morwood
- Platforms: Linux; macOS; Windows; Nintendo Switch; Xbox One; Xbox Series X/S
- Release: Linux, Mac, Windows; WW: July 16, 2020; Switch, Xbox One & Series X/S; WW: April 29, 2021
- Genre: Exploration
- Mode: Single-player

Before I Forget is an exploration game developed and published by 3-Fold Games. It was originally released in 2020 as a Humble Original on personal computers and was ported to consoles a year later. It depicts the effects of Alzheimer's disease on a woman who is trying to recall her life.

== Gameplay ==
Players guide Sunita Appleby, a scientist who has early-onset Alzheimer's disease, through her house. As she interacts with now-unfamiliar objects about her house, some of her memories return. It is played from a first-person perspective. The game features some puzzle-like elements, such as recalling where mementos have been left and asking players to guide Appleby to the bathroom when she perceives her house as a shifting maze.

== Development ==
3-Fold Games consists of writer Chella Ramanan and programmer-artist Claire Morwood. Ramanan lives in Sweden, and Morwood in Scotland. Ramanan and Morwood met at a British game jam and conceived of Before I Forget there. Ramanan had previously been considering a story about memories and felt that a video game would be the best medium to explore memories firsthand. The theme of the game jam was borders, and they saw mental health and Alzheimer's disease as an interesting metaphorical take on the subject. Neither developer has personal experience with Alzheimer's disease and always meant the game to be a character study. The two had not planned on following through with further development, but feedback at the game jam and an audience award convinced them to continue. As interest grew in their project, they became anxious to depict the disease correctly.

3-Fold had a chance meeting with a healthcare worker who corrected details about Alzheimer's disease. This led them to work with Gaming The Mind, a mental health charity, who helped 3-Fold design the game's puzzles and internal dialogue to be more authentic expressions of Alzheimer's disease. They also implemented suggestions from early playtesters, who related personal anecdotes. The game was designed to depict anxiety rather than horror. Ramanan chose the palette to reflect this. The audio and visuals reflect the protagonist's current mental state. The division between greyscale and color visuals, representing confusion and clarity, existed from the earliest versions.

3-Fold said that although investors were interested in the game, they complained that it was too short. In response, 3-Fold experimented with extending the gameplay but did not like the result. The lack of funding meant Ramanan and Morwood had to work on Before I Forget in their spare time. Humble Original eventually picked up the game, which brought financing enough to add voice acting and PR. It was included in a Humble Choice bundle in June 2020 and was released for Linux, macOS, and Windows on July 16, 2020. It was ported to the Nintendo Switch, Xbox One and Series X/S, on April 29, 2021.

== Reception ==
Reception

Aggregate scores
| Aggregator | Score |
|---|---|
| Metacritic | (XSX) 88/100 (NS) 76/100 |
| OpenCritic | 100% recommend |

Review score
| Publication | Score |
|---|---|
| Nintendo Life | 8/10 |

Before I Forget received generally favorable reviews from critics, according to the review aggregation website Metacritic. Fellow review aggregator OpenCritic assessed that the game received strong approval, being recommended by 100% of critics. Hope Bellingham wrote in her review for GamesRadar that it "sent me on an existential spiral" where she considered the nature of memory and how we perceive reality. Christian Donlan of Eurogamer wrote that it is "filled with insight and generosity" and puts Appleby's life at the forefront without letting Alzheimer's disease define her. In The Guardian's review, Simon Parkin called it "a memorable, affecting journey" that is both compassionate and celebratory. Nintendo Life's review, Thomas Whitehead, called it "a short, beautiful experience" that may be emotionally difficult for those who have personal experience with loved ones with dementia.

Harry Shepherd of PC Gamer chose the game his favorite of 2020, calling it "a mature, crucial experience that helps us understand" Alzheimer's disease. Before I Forget was also Henry Stockdale's choice for most memorable game of 2021 for Eurogamer. Stockdale called it "utterly heart-breaking, incredibly compassionate, and absolutely beautiful all at once". TechRadar included it in a list of best games from black developers and best games designed by women. It was nominated for the British Academy Games Award for Game Beyond Entertainment in 2020. Following the critical acclaim of Before I Forget, Chella Ramanan continued to make waves in the industry by co-founding POC in Play, an independent organization dedicated to promoting diversity and inclusion in games. Her influence also extended into AAA game development, where she contributed as a narrative designer on Avatar: Frontiers of Pandora, developed by Massive Entertainment.
