= Julia Hardy =

British television presenter

- Born: Harrow, London, England
- Occupation: Presenter
- Years active: 2005–present
- Website: itsjuliahardy.com

Jules Hardy (born Julia Hardy) is a British television presenter known for their (Note: Hardy is non-binary and uses they/them pronouns.) interests in gaming, music, e-sports, and new technology. They are the creator and presenter of the online fitness programme Game to Train. In addition to their professional work, they are a live streamer on Twitch and a YouTuber.

== Career ==
Born in Harrow, London, Hardy began their career in 2005 when they were chosen to be a founding presenter of the British television channel Rockworld TV. On Rockworld TV, they co-presented Rockjaw and went on to become a field reporter, covering music events such as Maschinenfest, Download Festival and the Reading and Leeds Festivals. In 2008, they became a presenter on Current TV show The Countdown, and in 2009 joined Ginx TV as presenter of GameFace and Ginx Files which were shown on Bravo and later Challenge. Also in 2009, they launched an online television show called AE:On.

As well as presenting, Hardy also contributes articles to magazines and newspapers such as GamesMaster, Tuned, Big Cheese and the Sunday Telegraph. In 2016, they became BBC Radio 1's gaming presenter where they make a monthly gaming show for BBC iPlayer and features on other radio shows talking about video games. That same year, Hardy gave a TEDx talk about sexism, misogyny, and online trolls.

In 2017, Hardy hosted an AOL original series called Tech Hunters, looking at retro and nostalgic technology. In November 2017, they hosted Minecon Earth's Post and Pre-show which was an online stream broadcast around the world based on the game, Minecraft. In October 2019, they hosted Runefest, a convention for fans of the game RuneScape. In 2020, they joint hosted the This Game Changed My Life podcast series on the BBC with Aoife Wilson. This series has been nominated for an award in the Best New Show category of the 2021 Audio and Radio Industry Awards. On 25 April 2022, they hosted the Gayming Awards 2022 at Troxy in London.

== Game to Train ==
In 2020, Hardy created the free online exercise programme Game to Train. The exercise programme is based around routines inspired by characters from well known computer games.

== Personal life ==
Hardy is non-binary and uses they/them pronouns.
