= Northway Games =

Canadian independent video game studio

Northway Games is a Canadian independent video game studio consisting of wife-and-husband team Sarah and Colin Northway. They are best known for the game Fantastic Contraption, a puzzle game nominated for the Independent Games Festival Nuovo Award for Innovation in Game Design in 2016, Incredipede, another puzzler, featured at the Tokyo Game Show's Sense of Wonder Night in 2011 and nominated for the IGF Excellence In Visual Art in 2013, and also the Rebuild strategy series. Sarah's latest release, I Was a Teenage Exocolonist, has won several awards as well. The two have received some press coverage over their digital nomad lifestyle.

== Games ==
- Incredipede (2012)
- Rebuild (2011)
- Rebuild 2 (2011)
- Deep Under the Sky (2014)
- Rebuild 3: Gangs of Deadsville (2015)
- Fantastic Contraption (2016)
- I Was a Teenage Exocolonist (2022)
