= Clair Obscur: Expedition 33 =

2025 video game

- Developer: Sandfall Interactive
- Publisher: Kepler Interactive
- Director: Guillaume Broche
- Producer: François Meurisse
- Designers: Guillaume Broche; Michel Nohra
- Programmer: Tom Guillermin
- Artist: Nicholas Maxson-Francombe
- Writers: Jennifer Svedberg-Yen; Guillaume Broche; Victor Deleard (Note: Junior game designer at Sandfall credited for undertaking additional quest writing)
- Composers: Lorien Testard; Alice Duport-Percier (Note: Vocal composer and main vocalist)
- Engine: Unreal Engine 5
- Platforms: PlayStation 5; Windows; Xbox Series X/S
- Release: 24 April 2025
- Genre: Role-playing
- Mode: Single-player

Clair Obscur: Expedition 33 (Note: Clair obscur is the French translation of the Italian word chiaroscuro, an art style that emphasises the differences between light and dark.) is a 2025 role-playing video game developed by Sandfall Interactive and published by Kepler Interactive. Set in a dark fantasy Belle Époque-inspired universe, the game follows the members of Expedition 33 as they set out to destroy the Paintress, a mysterious entity causing the yearly "Gommage", which results in those at or above an ever-decreasing age being erased from existence. In Expedition 33, one controls a party of characters from a third-person perspective, exploring areas and battling enemies. Its turn-based mechanics feature real-time inputs from the player such as quick time events and timed actions in combat.

The project originated in 2019 with Guillaume Broche, a Ubisoft employee, as a personal endeavor. He would subsequently leave the company in 2020 during the COVID-19 pandemic to form Sandfall Interactive with friends and contacts, steadily establishing a core team of around 30 to 40 developers, supported by a crew of 8 freelance gameplay combat animators. The project would also involve traditional specialized contractors at the relevant stages of production, including motion-capture actors, voice actors, game testers and translators. Inspired by the Japanese RPGs that shaped their youth, such as the Final Fantasy and Persona series, the developers at Sandfall sought to create a high-fidelity turn-based role-playing game, the kind of which they felt AAA studios had neglected. Development began with Unreal Engine 4 and later switched to Unreal Engine 5, providing rendering improvements.

Representing Sandfall's debut game, Clair Obscur: Expedition 33 was released for PlayStation 5, Windows and Xbox Series X/S on 24 April 2025, and was available day one on Xbox Game Pass. The game received universal acclaim from critics for its narrative and themes, art direction, game direction, original soundtrack, gameplay, and performances. As of 24 April 2026, it has sold over 8 million copies. Clair Obscur: Expedition 33 won a myriad of accolades from awards ceremonies and media outlets alike. It became the most awarded title in The Game Awards' history, winning nine of the record thirteen nominations it received at The Game Awards 2025, including the paramount Game of the Year recognition. It also earned the distinction of being the first debut title and second overall title, after Baldur's Gate 3, to win the Game of the Year accolade from all five major game award ceremonies: The Game Awards, D.I.C.E. Awards, GDC Awards, Golden Joystick Awards and BAFTA Games Awards.

== Gameplay ==
In this screenshot, Lune, Gustave, and Maelle are fighting against an enemy. On each turn, players can perform a basic melee attack, consume an item, use action points to shoot an enemy or use a skill.

Clair Obscur: Expedition 33 is a third-person turn-based role-playing game with real-time elements. The player controls a party of Expeditioners exploring a fantasy world. On their turns, players select whether to use an item, perform a melee attack to gain Ability Points, or spend accumulated Ability Points to use ranged attacks or Skills. Ranged attacks are aimed freely, similar to a third-person shooter. When using a Skill, a quick time event can be completed for improved effects. During enemy turns, the player can dodge, parry, or jump over attacks in real time to avoid damage. Parrying requires more precise timing than dodging but provides Ability Points and the opportunity to counterattack. A stamina system allows players to "Break" enemies, temporarily stunning them. As players progress, the game introduces new attacks and parries, including Gradient Attacks, Gradient Counters, and Gradient Skills, all of which deal significant damage. The use of gradient attacks is monitored by the party using a shared gauge. It will slowly fill up when the party uses skills in combat. The Expeditioners and enemies can also apply various status effects on each other, boosting or impairing either side's combat efficiency. Some enemies have weak points that can be targeted, or may be vulnerable to certain elemental attacks. If the combat party is defeated, reserve characters may be called in to continue fighting. Combat ends when either side has no remaining combatants, or when the player decides to flee the battlefield when they are facing minor enemies.

The game features six playable characters, with each having unique skill trees, weapons and gameplay mechanics. The mage Lune's Skills generate elemental "Stains", which can be spent to enhance her Skills. The fencer Maelle switches between Stances, which alter her Skills, damage and defense. The scythe-wielding warrior Sciel can use a set of magical cards to apply and stack "Foretell" to enemies, and then consume them to inflict maximum damage on enemies. Gustave and Verso deal more damage to enemies the more they attack them. Gustave, in particular, gains charge based on the amount of attacks he's done, which can be expelled, doing increased damage depending on the number of charges. Verso, on the other hand, gains "Perfection" ranks upon landing hits, parries, and how little he gets damaged; which will increase his damage output the higher his Perfection rank becomes. The Gestral Monoco can transform into enemies and use their abilities against them. Some of his abilities are further enhanced by his "Bestial Wheel", which spins whenever Monoco uses his abilities. When the party is not exploring or fighting enemies, they can rest at a camp. While playing as Verso, players can converse with other members of Expedition 33 and raise their relationship levels, unlocking new cinematics, skills and quests.

Combat encounters reward experience points, currency, and upgrades. Each time a character levels up, they gain three attribute points, which can be spent on increasing five core character stats: Vitality (maximum health), Might (attack power), Agility (frequency of attack), Defense (damage reduction), and Luck (critical rate). The abilities of the Expeditioners are further customized with equipable "Pictos" which add a variety of perks and further improve a character's stats. There are a total of 210 Pictos items. Each character can equip three Pictos at a time. Players can 'master' the use of Pictos after winning four separate combats while having it equipped, unlocking its passive bonuses (known as Luminas) for other Expeditioners to use. Each character has Lumina Points, which dictate how many Luminas they can equip at a time. As players level up, their maximum Lumina Points will increase, and players can find additional Lumina Points as collectibles during exploration. As players explore, they will collect "Chroma Catalysts", which can be used to upgrade weapons to higher levels at the camp. Higher-level weapons deal more base damage to enemies and offer additional gameplay perks.

While the game is set in linear levels, players can explore off the beaten path where they will find hidden resources, side quests, collectibles, character outfits, Gestral merchants, and optional bosses. Each level also has several Expedition Flags, where players can heal their party, fast travel, restock items, and allocate attribute and skill points. Resting at an Expedition Flag respawns most enemies. Levels in the game are connected by an overworld map known as "The Continent". Eventually, the Expeditioners meet Esquie, a mythical creature who helps the party to travel across The Continent. Esquie acquires new traversal abilities as players progress, granting the ability to swim, fly, and dive underwater. These new traversal abilities are essential for players to advance the story and access optional zones. The game has multiple difficulty options and a New Game Plus mode, allowing the player to replay the game with increased difficulty while retaining all character progression from their first playthrough.

== Synopsis ==
=== Setting ===
Clair Obscur: Expedition 33 takes place in a dark fantasy Belle Époque setting. 67 years prior to the game's events, a disaster called the Fracture isolated the city of Lumière from the rest of the continent. At its center, the Monolith, a giant rock formation, is visible from Lumière. Once every subsequent year, an entity known as the Paintress (Tracy Wiles), paints a number on the Monolith, and all humans with an age equal to or above that number disappear, an event called the Gommage. (Note: The French word "gommage" means erasure.) The number was initially 100; thus by the time of the game's story, all humans aged 34 or older have disappeared.

Every year, after the Gommage, Lumière sends an expedition of volunteers to the mainland in an attempt to slay the Paintress, the latest fated to undertake this perilous mission being Expedition 33. The fractured continent is populated by monsters called Nevrons, most hostile to humans, as well as by the more friendly and civilized Gestrals and Grandis.

Members of Expedition 33 include: Gustave (Charlie Cox), a resourceful engineer with a mechanical arm; Maelle (Jennifer English), the youngest member of the Expedition and Gustave's foster sister; Lune (Kirsty Rider), a brilliant scholar and mage; and Sciel (Shala Nyx), a calm and cheerful farmer turned teacher. As the expedition traverses the mainland, they encounter various individuals, including: Renoir (Andy Serkis), a mysterious elderly man who ruthlessly hunts them upon making landfall; Verso (Ben Starr), a stranger who keeps watch over them from afar; Alicia, a mute girl in a mask; Monoco (Rich Keeble), a Gestral loyal to Verso; and Esquie (Maxence Cazorla), a portly mythical creature who serves as their transportation across the mainland.

=== Plot ===
On the day of the Gommage, Gustave bids farewell to his 33-year-old ex-lover, Sophie. With only a year left to live, he joins Expedition 33. Upon making landfall, most expeditioners are killed by Renoir. Gustave survives and locates the three other survivors: Lune, Sciel, and Maelle, the last of whom was rescued by a mysterious entity known as the Curator, who aids the expeditioners. Continuing their expedition, they enlist Esquie's help while Maelle begins having visions of a masked girl. Renoir attacks again and kills Gustave, who was trying to defend Maelle. Verso intervenes, allowing the other expeditioners to escape.

Joining the expedition, Verso reveals that he was a member of the first expedition and Renoir—his father—was their commander; furthermore, the masked girl is his sister, Alicia. They all received immortality from the Paintress; thus, Renoir guards her to protect his family, but Verso is tired of eternal life and wishes to kill her to end it. After recruiting Monoco, the expedition reaches Renoir's mansion to find and destroy the Paintress' heart, a being bearing a striking resemblance to the Curator, to disable a barrier protecting her. Unfortunately, the plan fails when Renoir teleports the mansion and the heart away. Lune devises a new plan: have the Curator forge a weapon to pierce the barrier from the hearts of powerful beings called Axons.

After destroying the barrier, the expedition is confronted by the Paintress' heart and taken inside the Monolith, where they defeat Renoir and the Paintress herself. Afterward, the expedition returns to Lumière as heroes. Unbeknownst to everyone except Verso, the Curator was the true culprit behind the Gommage, and the Paintress was actually stalling him. With her protection gone, the Curator then kills Lumière's entire population, save for Verso.

The story flashes back to the Dessendre family in early 20th-century Paris: mother Aline, father Renoir, son Verso, eldest daughter Clea, and youngest daughter Alicia. They are artists capable of creating worlds within magical paintings; Lumière resides within one such canvas, made by Verso Dessendre. A rival faction set fire to their mansion, resulting in Verso Dessendre's death and Alicia Dessendre's disfigurement. Grief-stricken, Aline entered her son's canvas and created copies of her family, becoming the Paintress. Since extended stays inside canvases are unhealthy, Renoir Dessendre attempted to force her out, and their clash caused the Fracture. To shift the stalemate in her father's favor, Clea created the Nevrons and tasked her sister with aiding him. Upon entering the canvas, Alicia Dessendre got overwhelmed by Aline's power and reincarnated as Maelle without her memories.

Back in the present, following her "death", Maelle regains her memories and revives herself. Reuniting with Verso, he comes clean about tricking the expedition into expelling Aline from the canvas. She then approaches the Curator—revealed to be Renoir Dessendre—hoping that he would revive everyone. Seeing that his daughter has chosen to identify as Maelle rather than as her true self as Alicia Dessendre, he instead intends to erase the canvas. Disagreeing, Maelle revives the other expeditioners, and a battle ensues for control of the canvas. In the end, with Aline's reentering the canvas, Renoir Dessendre is defeated and relents before leaving with his wife.

Realizing that, like Aline, Maelle intends to stay inside the canvas indefinitely, Verso approaches the last fragment of Verso Dessendre's soul, which maintains the painting. Verso wants it to pass on, which would erase the canvas and force Maelle out, while she tries to stop him.

- If the player sides with Maelle, the Canvas is saved, and she rebuilds Lumière and revives its people, including Gustave and Sophie. Maelle also recreates Verso against his will, and her health begins to decline from staying in the Canvas for too long.
- If the player sides with Verso, he banishes Maelle before convincing Verso Dessendre's soul remnant to stop maintaining the canvas, erasing it along with himself and the remaining expeditioners in the process. Back in reality, the Dessendre family reconciles after coming to terms with Verso Dessendre's death.

== Development ==
=== Background ===
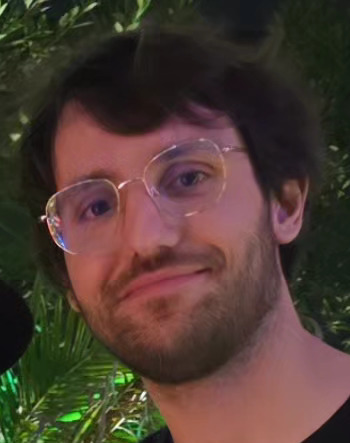
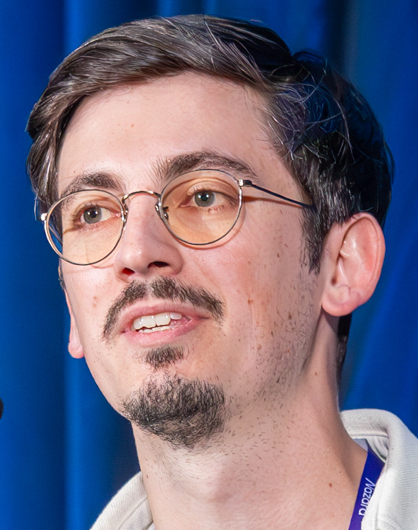
Sandfall Interactive was founded by creative director Guillaume Broche (left), technical director Tom Guillermin (right), and producer François Meurisse.

The tale of Expedition 33 begins in 2019 with Guillaume Broche, an employee of Ubisoft, during his stint at Massive Entertainment in Malmö, Sweden. Not being employed in a technical role at the company, he began exploring the capabilities of Unreal Engine 4 in his spare time. This curiosity soon evolved into a personal passion project inspired by his favorite childhood games, most notably the Final Fantasy series, with the goal of creating a prototype for a turn-based RPG, titled "We Lost". This endeavor already featured the names of some of the characters (Maelle and Lune) and eventually integrated real-time mechanics to hybridize the turn-based combat system; which would carry over to what would become Expedition 33. To craft the reactive turn-based combat system, Broche sought the help of Tom Guillermin, a gameplay programmer and fellow young French employee at the same Malmö-based Ubisoft subsidiary, whom he had befriended.

He would later reach out to find collaborators for a demo, including on Reddit where he looked for voice actors in April 2020. (Note: on the subreddit r/RecordThisForFree) In order to focus on the project full-time, Broche, who had been transferred from Massive Entertainment to Ubisoft Shanghai in September 2019, would leave the company a year later during the COVID-19 pandemic to establish Sandfall Interactive, alongside Guillermin and François Meurisse, a friend he had met during his university days. The three co-founders were joined by Lorien Testard, Nicholas Maxson-Francombe and Jennifer Svedberg-Yen; the six forming the kick-off team. Lorien Testard, the composer, was discovered by Broche through a post on a French indie video game forum where he linked a track from his SoundCloud page. Maxson-Francombe, the game's art director, UI artist, set dresser and character co-designer, was discovered and recruited off ArtStation by Broche. Svedberg-Yen, one of the voice actors cast for the original demo as a result of the Reddit post and whom Broche had befriended, soon gained a more prominent role in the project, assisting him in writing the script; as development progresses, she would ultimately become the game's lead writer as well as the team's voice and localization producer. Initially based in a western suburb of Paris where it was founded in October 2020, Sandfall officially relocated to Montpellier, in southern France, in April 2021.

==== Art and narrative ====
Screenshot of a demo trailer, released via a Reddit post by Broche in 2020, for We Lost, which would later become Expedition 33. The game's setting originally took inspiration from the steampunk subgenre.

As Broche's project was originally intended to lead to a game titled We Lost, development began under the codename "Project W". The demo he had posted on Reddit in search of voice actors showcased a steampunk setting inspired by Victorian era England, with more science fiction elements, including zombies and aliens. About four months into this approach, potential investors, unconvinced, suggested that Broche should "think bigger" and ponder what he would want to do if his team wasn't restricted by its limited resources. We Lost's universe wasn't a deliberate artistic choice by Broche but more of a practical necessity. He needed to find assets for his prototype, and the Unreal Engine Marketplace packs for steampunk and Victorian thematic biomes were readily available. Unlike the high-fidelity turn-based RPG, which was sacrosanct to him, the setting and narrative skin of the game were thus secondary details that could be completely reimagined. Consequently, the team reset the entire story, opting for the Belle Époque, which they were naturally well acquainted with and deemed more distinctive. The period thus served as the primary cultural foundation for Expedition 33, blending Art Nouveau and Art Deco for the visual world design, as well as taking inspiration from surrealism, symbolism and dark romanticism. The concept for the game's new narrative originated from an unexpected, abstract visual catalyst. It was sparked by a painting Broche admired, featuring a fawn-like creature with pointed legs standing in the sand. Though the artwork itself bore no relation to what became the plot, this led him to think of a mysterious monolith, a looming countdown, and a colossal, phantom-like female painter. In this lore, the giant entity would paint a number that decreases each year, signaling impending deaths. Recognizing the strength of the concept, the team immediately adopted it as the narrative's central hook. Broche additionally took some inspiration from the French fantasy novel La Horde du Contrevent by Alain Damasio. The latter features "hordes"—elite teams of adventurers—who have, for eight centuries, embarked on an odyssey aiming to reach the "Extrême-Amont", the mythical source of the winds that ravage their world. These hordes, trained from childhood in the city of Aberlaas, trek thousands of kilometers on foot against brutal headwinds, hoping to understand, master, or stop the storms. While La Horde du Contrevent and Clair Obscur: Expedition 33 tell very different stories, the premise of successive hordes marching toward the Extrême-Amont in the novel inspired the broad idea of expeditions setting out to eradicate the mysterious goddess-like paintress. Broche's premise was then associated with a short story unrelated to the project that lead writer Svedberg-Yen had written on her own for fun, in which a female painter capable of traveling through her own works got lost in one, prompting her daughter's endeavor to save her.

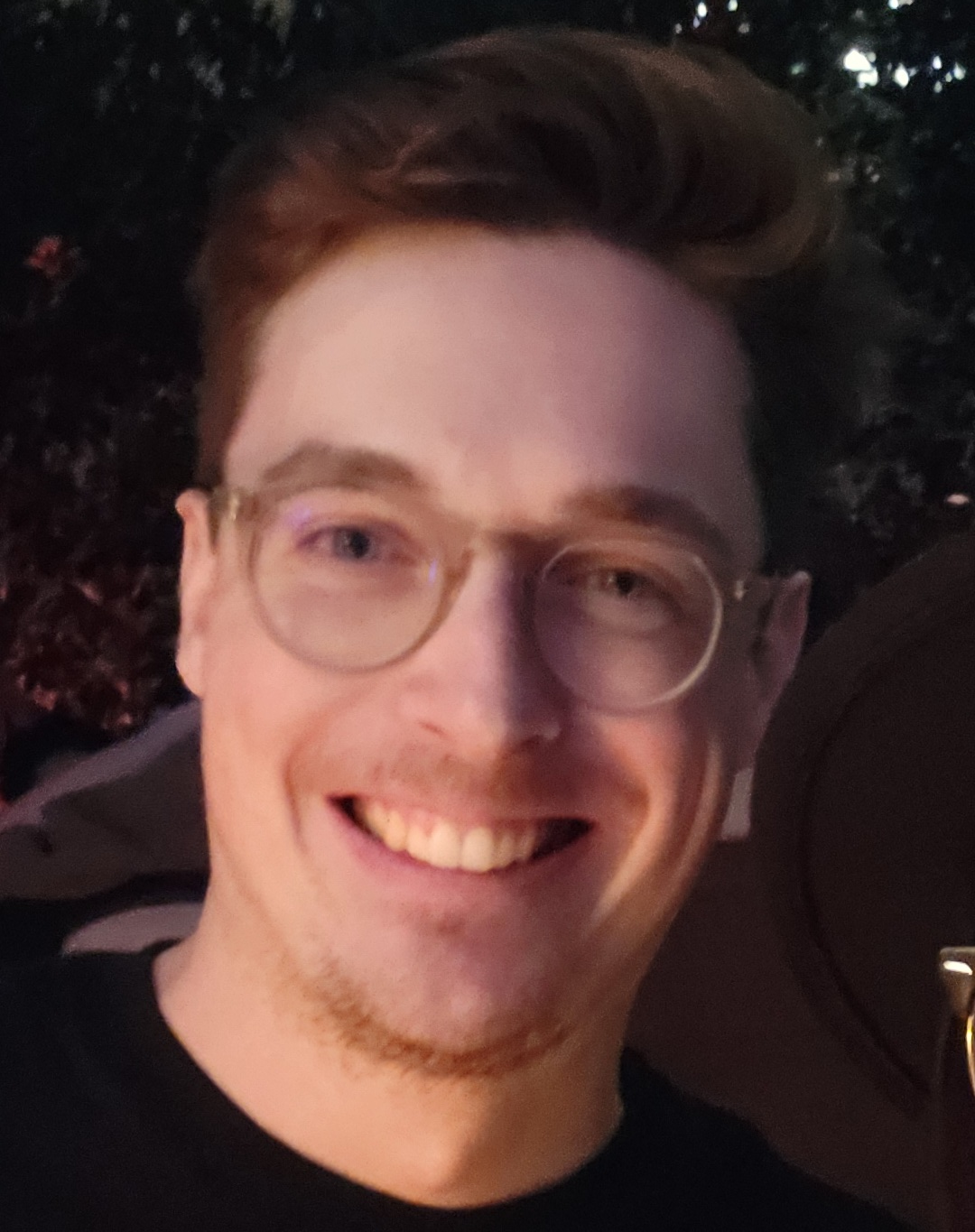
Art director Nicholas Maxson-Francombe (left) and lead writer Jennifer Svedberg-Yen (right)

Svedberg-Yen stated the game's core themes, grief and sorrow, originate with Broche's mother and represented the "final piece" that unified Broche's premise and hers. As the two were stuck on the draft, Broche asked his mother what would be the worst thing that could happen to her; she answered the loss of any of her children. This notably became the foundation for Aline's character and the catalyst for her decision to dwell in what Svedberg-Yen and Broche subsequently conceived as her departed son's canvas. While other aspects of the narrative were crafted as the game progressed, Svedberg-Yen asserted that the ending of Act I, featuring the death of Gustave, was something she and Broche had set early on, as part of the emotional journey they wanted for the characters. The team kept some of the characters Broche had envisioned for We Lost (Maelle and Lune), but their design and characterization were reimagined for Expedition 33. The characters Noco and Monoco derive their names from the Swedish energy drink Nocco. Broche and Guillermin having met during their stint at Massive Entertainment, a refrigerator at the studio was reportedly filled with the beverage. The studio's dog, Monoco, who's credited as Sandfall's "Happiness Manager" on the studio's website, is named after the character; meanwhile, Svedberg-Yen's own dog, Trunks, was an inspiration for the latter's character design, notably his mop-like hair style.

The game’s narrative was primarily spearheaded by Svedberg-Yen and Broche. Together, they crafted the script for the main storyline; the main path, journal entries, and character relationship dialogues having been exclusively co-authored by the duo. Level and quest designer Victor Deleard, one of Sandfall's junior recruits, later contributed to specialized narrative duties. Deleard co-wrote the Nevron side quests and the Gestral dialogue with Broche. The script for Expedition 33 is about 800 pages long, not counting NPC dialogue or lore-related documentation.

==== Music ====
Lorien Testard (left) led composition of the game's music, joined by Alice Duport-Percier (right), who was also the primary vocalist.

Composition of the game's music and lyric writing were undertaken by Lorien Testard; he would later be joined by soprano Alice Duport-Percier, who composed the vocal lines and was the primary vocalist during recording. Testard used a variety of leitmotifs through the score for various character themes and placed heavy emphasis on making the soundtrack feel dynamic, responding to the player's—and the greater world's—activities as the game's narrative progresses. During combat, accompanying music is designed to soften during long-winded periods of recuperation and to gradually intensify to complement the fight's climax and conclusion.

Compensating for the overall unpredictability of the player's actions was cited by Testard as among the most challenging aspects of composition. He examined the emotional core of every battle, location, and character in a vacuum, guiding him as to what mood each song ought to elicit. This led to an assemblage of distinct musical genres, including jazz, rock, neoclassical and electronic music.

=== Pre-production ===
Sandfall environment and props artist Mathieu Costat (left) and lead character artist Alan Reynaud (right). The latter was among the first employees to join the kick-off team.

After the studio was founded, over 200 interviews were conducted in the following months in order to gather its first conventionally recruited employees. Between April and October 2021, game designer Thomas Frappart, technical UI artist Brieuc Inisan, (Note: a Sandfall employee from April 2021 to June 2024) lead character artist and character co-designer Alan Reynaud, lead environment artist Carla Devèze, technical artist Alexandre Breton, VFX artist Léo Paris and principal sound designer Maxance Playez, all joined Sandfall. The team of around a dozen people then moved on to more advanced prototypes with the ultimate goal of creating a vertical slice to pitch to publishers, as efforts to find one willing to finance the project had been largely unsuccessful.

As publishers and professional investors alike had turned down the project, this initial phase of development was funded by a few angel investors, relatives, friends and multimedia arts-dedicated public grants Sandfall applied for. As to the latter case, the sudio most notably appealed for a €154,000 aid from the Centre national du cinéma et de l'image animée (CNC)'s Video Game Support Fund and was among the dozen French indie game developers whose requests were approved by the CNC for the fourth quarter of 2021. It also requested additional pre-production funding from the Occitania Region (Note: The administrative region of France the city of Montpellier is located in is Occitania.) via its Video Game Prototyping Grant Program, which offers grants ranging from €9,000 to €45,000 to support studios based in the region in the creation of original prototypes. Finally, Sandfall applied for and obtained a $50,000 Epic MegaGrant from Epic Games for the project. Broche credits all of these with allowing the co-founders to properly structure the nascent studio. It also enabled the team to build the vertical slice of the game they pitched to publishers at the Game Developers Conference in March 2022. This vertical slice validated the game’s concept and helped secure production funding, as interest finally arose. While Sandfall received offers from several publishers in the industry at GDC 2022, it ultimately made the choice to partner with Kepler Interactive; the promise the team would retain creative freedom over Expedition 33 being stated by both Broche and Meurisse to have been a key factor in this decision, as publishers typically finance a title in exchange for varying degrees of control over its development.

=== Production ===
Audio lead and music designer Raphaël Joffres (left), technical and cinematic sound designer Olivier Penchenier (center), and principal sound designer Maxance Playez (right) are members of Sandfall's sound design team

Previously renting a small workspace within the office of Montpellier-based post-production company Audio Workshop, Sandfall was able to move to a place of its own near downtown to prepare for the studio's growth, after having inked its partnership with Kepler in the first semester of 2022 and securing funding for their project from the publisher. Taking the unusual form of an early 20th-century Art Deco-style town mansion instead of a traditional corporate office, the founders wanted it to feel like a cozy home for the team. The office is facetiously nicknamed "Le Manoir" (The Manor) due to it coincidentally resembling a mini-version of the eponymous estate Sandfall had already fully conceived for Expedition 33.

With the vertical slice having marked the completion of the pre-production phase, the secured budget enabled the team to move onto developing an alpha version of the game and continue recruiting the necessary talent; notably additional programmers, game designers, character and level artists, and the studio's cinematic artists, cinematic animators as well as its video and capture artists. Sandfall soon grew into a company of about 30 to 40 employees, a few of whom—including Broche and Guillermin—had formerly worked at Ubisoft. These new recruits included Michel Nohra (a specialist in combat systems, progression, economy and balance) who would spearhead the studio's game design unit as the lead game designer; music designer Raphaël Joffres who would lead the sound design unit; meanwhile, senior gameplay programmer Forian Torres, UI and gameplay programmer Victor Boulez, and engine programmer Jérôme Vaglienti, would join the programming and UI unit led by technical director and lead programmer Guillermin. The operations and production unit was headed by production director Meurisse. Broche, as the creative director, drove the overarching artistic vision, and steered the studio's game design unit, its cinematic unit, as well as the acting talent, while also co-authoring the game's narrative and script with lead writer Svedberg-Yen.

Broche envisioned a specific style of gameplay combat animation for Expedition 33 and did not deem what they had done in the pre-production phase in this regard "cool enough". Unable to find recruits in France to materialize what he was looking for—a highly stylized and over-the-top battle choreography faithful to JRPGs rather than the more grounded approach generally found in western RPGs—he expanded his search for animators fitting that aesthetic beyond national borders. He would ultimately recruit Seungyun Kim (alias Sylvan Kim), an animator from South Korea, to bring the characters and bosses' fighting movements to life. Broche discovered him through animation reels posted by the latter on his YouTube channel. Kim already had a full-time job however, thus could only join the project as a freelancer and tackle the task in his free time. As development ramped up, Kim recruited seven of his friends in South Korea, thus bringing the number of people balancing their daily occupations with freelance work on Expedion 33's gameplay combat animation to eight. Although not part of the core team as freelancers, Broche and Guillermin have nonetheless highlighted the contribution of Kim and his peers to Expedition 33 in numerous interviews, and most notably at the 2026 Pégases Award Ceremony in Paris, which they were all invited to attend by Sandfall; joining members of the core team on stage when the game was awarded the "Excellence in Visuals" and the paramount "Best Video Game" recognitions.

Technical director and lead programmer Tom Guillermin (left), alongside senior gameplay programmer Florian Torres (right) at the Game Developers Conference in 2026

Broche and Guillermin credit the development of the game to the simplicity of modern engines. Development had begun with Unreal Engine 4 but soon switched to Unreal Engine 5 due to its improvements in rendering and animation. The engine's Nanite and Lumen features allowed for higher-fidelity assets and more-realistic lighting, respectively. The adoption of Lumen necessitated reworking the lighting for most environments. Additionally, UE5 had more support for character creation—an advantage over Reallusion's Character Creator, previously being used in this regard. Sandfall leveraged ready-made background assets like rocks, enabling them to focus artistic effort primarily on the creation of high-impact "hero assets", i.e. large-scale assets designed to make the viewer pause and marvel. The team at Sandfall also heavily relied on visual scripting, using Unreal Engine's Blueprints system for roughly 95% of the game's core gameplay logic instead of writing traditional C++ code. They built battle mechanics, skills, and buffs by connecting visual nodes in a flowchart style. With only 4 core programmers, relying on Blueprints allowed non-programming designers and artists to build, test, and contribute directly to gameplay logic without needing a deep engineering background. Traditional C++ and custom optimization were still nonetheless used for specific performance bottlenecks, experimental features, or advanced engine systems that lacked native Blueprint support.

Kepler's funding also allowed Sandfall to secure the traditional specialized contractors game studios partner with as to video game production. It notably contracted five mo-cap actors; Side UK and Studio Anatole as to voice casting and voice production in English and French respectively; dozens of musicians and a nine-person choir for the soundtrack recording sessions; the firm QLOC for game testing (quality assurance testing) during peak optimization phases; or localization specialist Riotloc near of the end of production, to translate and adapt the game in several other languages. Sandfall would also, at the tail end, receive assistance from seven Ebb Software employees to port the game to consoles.

Finally, the partnership with Kepler enabled the casting of celebrities such as Charlie Cox and Andy Serkis, and that of noted voice actor Ben Starr; Sandfall having made the choice to allocate much of the marketing budget the publisher earmarked for the game to this expense, as the studio deemed it would be a more effective way to reach people who wouldn't typically check out a game like Expedition 33. As to promotional events, the team hoped to take advantage of the free and far-reaching exposure granted by Xbox showcases in particular, to spark interest and garner its intended audience, after a deal for the game to launch on Xbox Game Pass on day one was inked. Cox has stated he was in a studio for barely four hours to record his lines and felt like a fraud over being lauded for his performance considering his marginal involvement in the project; though Svedberg-Yen clarified on her Instagram account that the task had taken around 8 hours, and praised his professionalism and efficiency.

=== Inspirations ===
Broche stated that the purpose of Expedition 33 was to create a turn-based JRPG-inspired title with high-fidelity graphics, which he felt had been neglected by AAA game developers and which he dearly missed. Besides the Final Fantasy series (namely Final Fantasy VI, VII, VIII, IX and X), he underlines other works of its creator, Hironobu Sakaguchi, as main influences in his life: Lost Odyssey and Blue Dragon, two JRPGs developed for Microsoft to help market the Xbox 360 in Japan and whose mechanics notably feature quick time events. He also highlights the Shin Megami Tensei series and its Persona sub-series; lauding Persona 5 in particular as the pinnacle of UI design and combat presentation in video games, with dynamic camera angles that shift seamlessly with every action, elevating the gameplay into a distinctly cinematic experience. Other JRPGs mentioned as inspirations for Expedition 33 include the Atelier, Shadow Hearts and Suikoden series, as well as Tales of Vesperia.

While action elements were not part of what he had envisioned for the gameplay at the start of his solo project, Broche ultimately chose to cross-pollinate turn-based strategy with the skill-based action ethos characteristic of the likes of the Dark Souls and Devil May Cry series or titles such as Sekiro: Shadows Die Twice; the latter being a game he was avidly playing throughout 2019 and which notably influenced Expedition 33's parry mechanics. This hybrid approach bridged Broche's twin passions: a lifelong love for JRPGs and a deep appreciation for hardcore Japanese action games.

Professed manga and anime enthusiasts—with Broche voicing a soft spot for Studio Ghibli's animated films especially—the team at Sandfall also cited, beyond video games, the likes of the Attack on Titan (Note: the concept of a group of heroes fighting together and the creation of instantly recognizable uniforms to give the game a distinct identity) and Bleach (Note: influenced the adoption of a "rule of cool" approach, focusing on coming up with character designs that are super simple yet incredibly memorable) manga series, as well as the Fire Force anime series, (Note: inspired the sound design, notably sound effects for the combat system; leading the audio team to lean away from realism and opt for a style characterized by slowdowns and heavy bass to emphasize power, rhythm, and the weighty impact of combos and counters) as works that influenced aspects of Expedition 33.

While the gameplay draws clear inspiration from classic JRPGs, the narrative structure is deeply rooted in French literature. Broche notes that years of reading French novels have subtly shaped the game's storytelling, giving the overarching plot a distinctly French sensibility.

=== Budget ===
Broche asserted that the budget for Expedition 33 was less than $10 million. He underlined this was made possible by sticking to a focused, linear and stylized structure rather than chasing expensive open-world trends. The studio returned to an old school role-playing game formula; Expedition 33 features eye-catching corridor-like levels, and transitions players to an arena for combat when they encounter enemies. A classic miniature overworld map gives the game a grand sense of scale—allowing players to experience the vastness of the world—without forcing the team to burn technical resources, time and money by having its designers render every small detail.

Leveraging Unreal Engine 5 features also significantly helped reduce expenses; as well as keeping headcount low and agile instead of scaling to hundreds of permanent employees. Even at the height of development, the number of people involved—including external partners—was far below what is typically seen in a traditional AAA production's credits.

== Marketing ==
The game was officially unveiled with a digital trailer reveal on 9 June 2024, during the Xbox Games Showcase, which also announced the title's day-one availability on Xbox Game Pass. Following this, Sandfall and Kepler capitalized on Gamescom in late August 2024 to host behind-closed-doors press previews, each lasting 30 minutes and featuring a live gameplay demonstration inside the Xbox press lounge. A dedicated "First Look" gameplay trailer was then released on 28 August. On 16 October 2024, Sandfall announced an English voice cast featuring Charlie Cox and Andy Serkis, followed by a tongue-in-cheek, French-dubbed, "Baguette Trailer" on 23 October that leaned into the studio's national roots.

Ahead of launch, the game maintained visibility through digital and creator-focused initiatives. Its release date of 24 April 2025 was announced during the Xbox Developer Direct '25 on 23 January 2025. Kepler subsequently partnered with influencer marketing platform Lurkit to distribute review keys and sponsor coverage across Twitch and YouTube; and launched a promotional mini-campaign in Asia—mainly in China and Japan—where Xbox Game Pass penetration is much lower and Xbox showcases hold less sway. To spearhead this localized promotion of Expedition 33 in China, Kepler enlisted gaming marketing firm IOI Gamer, which had previously helped the publisher advertise titles such as Sifu and Scorn in this market. The campaign featured trailers tailored for the Chinese audience and a hands-off press preview in Shanghai. In Japan, the team also hosted a press preview event in Tokyo on 25 February 2025. A joint interview with Broche and Japanese game director Hajime Tabata was later published on Denfaminico Gamer on 15 April 2025, in which Broche introduced his JRPG-inspired title to the local audience ahead of the game's launch in late April.

Between March and April 2025, Sandfall concluded the pre-release cycle with a series of weekly character spotlights and a final lore trailer. In an April 2025 industry analysis, marketing platform Streamforge noted that Kepler's estimated $212,000 influencer budget was a fraction of the $2.1 million allocated to the same end for a typical AAA title released earlier that year; and despite the smaller expenditure, Expedition 33 recorded a sponsored content rate of only 2% across its 35.28 million launch-window views—significantly lower than said AAA release (6.6%)—demonstrating that the game's visibility was driven primarily by grassroots word-of-mouth and genuine interest from creators and audiences alike.

Ultimately, rather than the global advertising campaigns of AAA titles enabled by eight-figure or nine-figure marketing budgets, which they could not afford, Sandfall and Kepler leveraged an Xbox Game Pass deal and related high-visibility digital Xbox showcases that came at little cost; Hollywood talent with less than a day of labor on the project but whose casting nonetheless generated headlines to elevate the perception of Expedition 33; content creator outreach; and modest localized campaigns in Asia. Early trailers and press impressions of the game's Belle Époque aesthetic and reactive turn-based combat system generated significant organic discussion on social media and wishlist growth (1 million wishlists across Steam, PlayStation and Xbox storefronts by 29 March 2025)—allowing the mid-market title to build substantial anticipation ahead of its April 2025 release without relying on any exorbitant promotional push.

== Release ==
Expedition 33 went gold on 22 March 2025, 33 days before its release. Physical distribution of the game for the PlayStation 5 and Xbox Series X/S consoles was handled by Maximum Entertainment in North America, and by Bandai Namco Entertainment in Europe as well as Asia, with the exception of Japan where it was carried out by Sega. The title was released on 24 April 2025 worldwide on PlayStation 5, Xbox Series X/S and PC (via Steam and Epic Games Store). Upon reaching the milestone of 5 million copies sold in early October 2025, Sandfall announced a free content update featuring a new location, additional late-game bosses, new character costumes, and expanded language support. This update was released on 11 December 2025 right after the title won the Game of the Year award at The Game Awards 2025.

Released on Xbox Game Pass on the same date it officially launched worldwide, and thus available to its subscribers to play from day one, Xbox Wire reported on 3 December 2025 that Expedition 33 was the biggest third-party title launch on the subscription service that year.

The soundtrack was also released on music streaming platforms the same day the game launched. On 24 July 2025, pre-orders for physical album releases in collaboration with Laced Records—consisting of four different vinyl editions and one complete CD collection—were officially announced. The vinyl editions include a 6LP box set (with a regular and an exclusive edition) and a Deluxe 2LP one (with a standard and an exclusive edition as well); each featuring 63 and 20 tracks respectively. The complete 8CD box set, meanwhile, features 179 tracks—the original 154, plus 25 extra tracks.

== Reception ==
=== Critical response ===
Reception

Aggregate scores
Aggregator	Score
Metacritic	(PS5) 92/100 (Note: Based on 86 reviews) (PC) 91/100 (Note: Based on 60 reviews) (XSXS) 91/100 (Note: Based on 21 reviews)
OpenCritic	98% recommend

Review scores
Publication	Score
Destructoid	9.5/10
Edge	10/10
Eurogamer	4/5
Famitsu	36/40
Game Informer	9/10
GameSpot	9/10
GamesRadar+	4.5/5
Hardcore Gamer	4.5/5
IGN	9/10
PC Gamer (US)	70/100
PCGamesN	8/10
Push Square	9/10
RPGamer	5/5
RPGFan	99/100
Shacknews	9/10
The Guardian	4/5
VG247	5/5

Clair Obscur: Expedition 33 received "universal acclaim" from critics according to review aggregator website Metacritic. This sentiment was also echoed by the users, with the game attaining one of the highest Metacritic userscore ratings of all time. Fellow review aggregator OpenCritic reported that 98% of critics recommended the game. On Steam, it reached an "Overwhelmingly positive" review score, with 95% of the more than 180,000 reviewers leaving favorable feedback. In Japan, four critics from Famitsu each awarded the game a score of 9 out of 10, for a total score of 36 out of 40.

Expedition 33's art direction and visual world design were praised by reviewers. Edge described them as "dreamily intoxicating", a sentiment echoed by Richard Wakeling of GameSpot, who nonetheless criticized the world for being "mechanically uninteresting [...] to explore". Additional criticism was directed at the absence of a mini-map, which can lead to occasional disorientation.

The story received critical acclaim, with particular praise for the voice acting, which was noted for bringing the characters to life and effectively supporting the narrative. IGN's Michael Higham commended the game for the way it "frames mortality, grief, and the small moments of joy we find". Liam Croft of Push Square noted that "every cutscene remains gripping, with an already intriguing plot heightened by [...] excellent voice acting".

Reviewers were impressed by the soundtrack and particularly praised its adaptability. Game Informer's Kyle Hilliard highlighted the contrast between the "somber piano music and haunting vocals", which underscore the characters' emotional experiences, and the combat themes that "bring the energy back up at precisely the right moment". Edge described the score as immense and "operatic".

Critics also noted the game's modern approach to traditional Japanese-style turn-based combat. Malindy Hetfeld of The Guardian noted that "a successful counter felt deeply satisfying every time". Ed Nightingale of Eurogamer further highlighted the variety in character fighting styles, each one introducing "a new system to learn", and the extensive options for character customization. Josh Brown for PCGamesN described the game as a "hyper-stimulating take on a genre once deemed too slow and stale for the HD era".

Expedition 33 was thus regarded as a major success by reviewers despite the minor shortcomings highlighted. Edge underlined that the ability to undertake side quests could lead to the player being overleveled and cause subsequent boss fights to be much less challenging and gratifying, but asserted it was "imprudent" to suggest an alteration to what they felt was a "masterpiece". Wakeling criticized the underwhelming exploration and small quality-of-life issues, but concluded that "these missteps aren't enough to significantly detract from a game with all the makings of an RPG classic".

Upon reaching the 1 million sales milestone, the French President Emmanuel Macron congratulated the studio on the achievement and highlighted the game's success as "a shining example of French audacity and creativity". Macron later congratulated Sandfall on its multiple accolades at the Game Awards in December 2025, stating: "A historic first for a French title! [...] Great pride for Montpellier and for France. Congratulations to the Sandfall Interactive team. For future generations and those that come after!". Michaël Delafosse, the mayor of Montpellier, where the studio is based, had also commended the team for their accomplishment in late May 2025 in a LinkedIn post, stating it will be "a reference in the international history of video games".

High-profile developers, including Hideo Kojima, Neil Druckmann, Ken Levine have voiced praise for Expedition 33, whether for the flexibility demonstrated by the small development team, the game's story, or the ability to achieve a product of great quality while avoiding the pitfalls of excessive monetization that can plague games developed and/or published by established AAA companies. Ari Gibson believed that it would win Game of the Year over his own game, Hollow Knight: Silksong, which was a fellow nominee for this accolade at The Game Awards 2025. Both Phil Spencer and Todd Howard picked Expedition 33 as their personal Game of the Year for 2025.

In 4Gamer's traditional year-end interview of prominent figures of the Japanese gaming industry, various game creators have designated the title as the game released in 2025 that impressed them the most; among them, Toshihiro Nagoshi (creator of the Yakuza series), Acquire's president and CEO Takuma Endo (creator of the Tenchu series), Atlus' Kazuyuki Yamai (Devil Summoner series and Shin Megami Tensei IV director, Shin Megami Tensei V producer and game planner), Square Enix's Naoki Hamaguchi (Final Fantasy VII Remake trilogy director), Gust's head Junzo Hosoi (Atelier series producer), Nihon Falcom's president Toshihiro Kondo (former director and current producer of the Trails and Ys series), Atlus' Atsushi Kitajoh (music composer and sound director of Persona 3 Reload), Capcom's Satoru Nihei (Onimusha: Way of the Sword director), Koei Tecmo's Yosuke Hayashi (Dead or Alive 5, Fire Emblem Warriors series and Hyrule Warriors series producer), Cygames's Tetsuya Fukuhara (Granblue Fantasy director) and Wright Flyer Studios's Shinnosuke Hirasawa (game designer for Another Eden: The Cat Beyond Time and Space).

=== Sales ===
Clair Obscur: Expedition 33 sold 500,000 copies within 24 hours after its release on 24 April 2025, 1 million copies within 3 days, 2 million copies within 12 days and 3.3 million copies within 33 days. On Steam, it was the 3rd best-selling game worldwide in its week of release; (Note: 2nd best-selling, with revenue generated by free games excluded) and then respectively 2nd, 3rd, 5th, 9th, 9th once more, and 10th in each of the six weeks that followed, encompassing 29 April to 10 June. (Note: 1st, 1st, 3rd, 5th, 7th and 9th with free games excluded) The game achieved a rare post-launch ascent on Steam, steadily climbing to an all-time peak of 145,063 concurrent players nearly two weeks after its debut on the platform. While most single-player releases peak on launch day and quickly taper off, Expedition 33 defied industry trends through rapid word-of-mouth momentum. After opening with 51,922 concurrent players on 24 April, the title surged past the 70,000-player mark the next day. Its audience continued to expand rapidly over its opening weekend, breaking into six figures to hit 121,422 concurrent players by 27 April. This routinely placed it among the Top 10 of Steam's daily most-played games in late April and early May, and propelled it to the 137th-highest peak ever achieved over the platform's 20-year of existence; with only 177 titles (0.0016% of all games available on the service) having ever managed to cross the 100,000 concurrent players milestone at the time. Rather than plateauing after its debut weekend, it maintained its upward trajectory into the following week, ultimately reaching its record high of 145,063 concurrent players on 4 May 2025.

On the PlayStation Store digital distribution service, it was the 4th best-selling PlayStation 5 game in Europe in April 2025 and the 2nd best-selling in May; the 6th best-selling in April and 3rd best-selling in May in the joint United States/Canada ranking; while being the 3rd best-selling in both months in Japan. As to physical sales, it was the best-selling retail game in France in its debut week, second best-selling in the United Kingdom and fourth best-selling in Japan in the two weeks covering 21 April to 4 May.

By October 2025, Expedition 33 had sold over 5 million copies worldwide. On Steam's year-end "Best of 2025" retrospective, it was featured in the Gold category (Note: the Gold category features, in no particular order, the games ranked 13th to 24th by revenue generated) on both the list of best-selling games released in 2025 on the platform and the list of best-selling games in 2025 regardless of release year. The game was also, overall, the 10th best-selling PlayStation 5 game on PlayStation Store in Europe in 2025, 13th best-selling in Japan and 18th best-selling in the joint United States/Canada ranking. Beyond purchases on such digital distribution platforms, the title notably ranked 10th by units and 11th by revenue in the Top 20 list of best-selling physical games in France across all consoles in 2025; with 154,282 physical copies sold in the country, 148,397 of which (96%) were sales on PlayStation 5. It was also featured in Famitsu's Top 100 best-selling physical games in Japan for the year 2025; ranking 86th, (Note: 52nd best-selling among those released in 2025 and 17th among all physical games sold in the country on PlayStation consoles that year) with 36,058 physical copies sold on PlayStation 5 in a list largely dominated by Nintendo Switch and Switch 2 releases. (Note: 80% of games in the Top 100 representing sales on the two Nintendo consoles)

On 24 April 2026, the date marking the game's first anniversary, Sandfall officially announced Expedition 33 had sold over 8 million copies globally and, on the same occasion, that it was additionally the most downloaded new third-party game on Xbox Game Pass in 2025.

=== Accolades ===
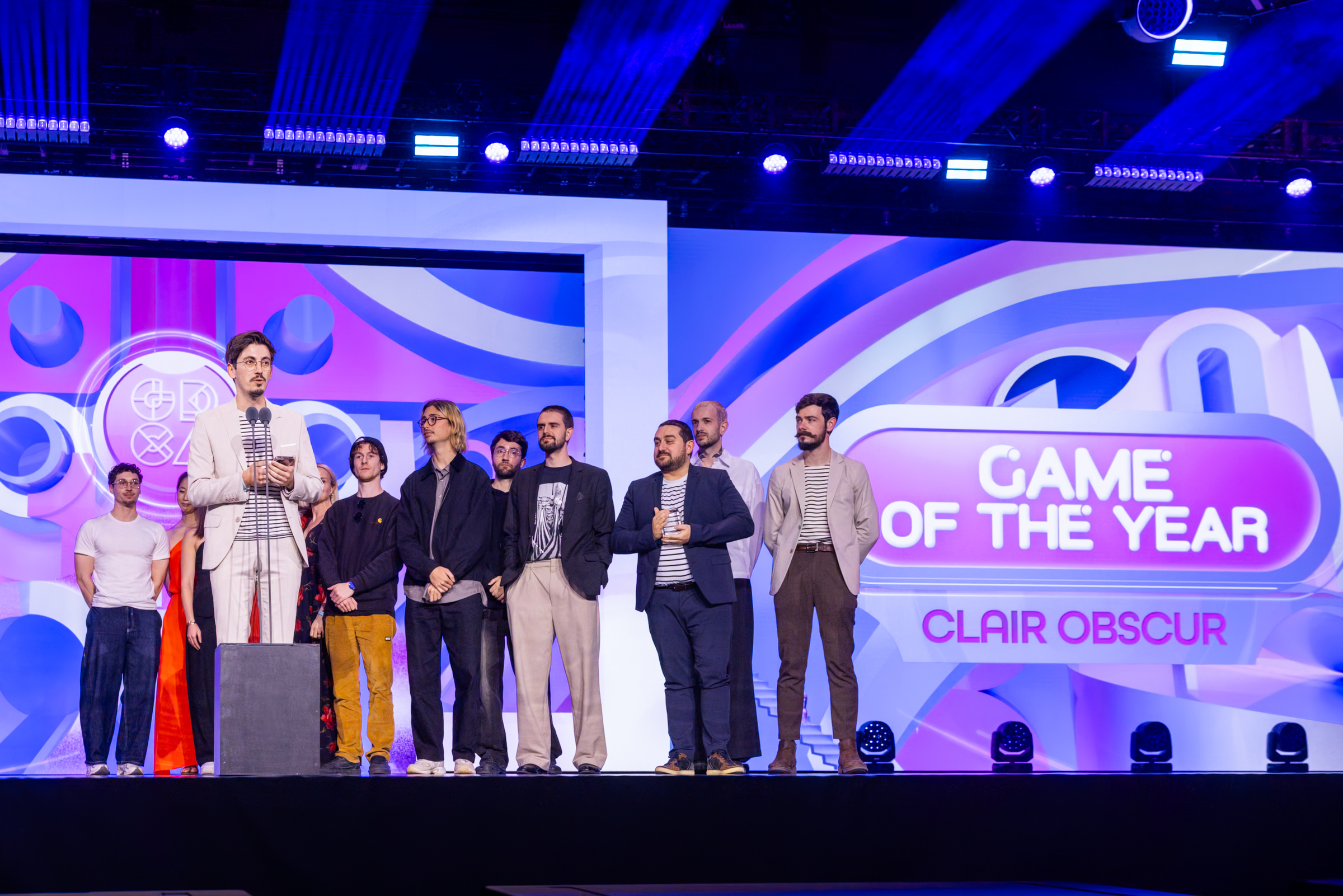
Members of Sandfall Interactive on stage after winning the Game of the Year award at the Game Developers Choice Awards 2026

Among its accolades, Expedition 33 was nominated for thirteen awards and won nine of them (including Game of the Year) at The Game Awards 2025, the highest number of nominations and wins for a single title in the event's history to date, surpassing the record previously held by The Last of Us Part II in 2020. The game and its development studio, Sandfall, also won all seven of the awards they were nominated for at the 2025 Golden Joystick Awards, including the 2025 Ultimate Game of the Year award; thus tying the record of accolades won in the event's history that was set by Baldur's Gate 3 and its developer Larian Studios in 2023.

The game has been ranked No. 1 on multiple publications' year-end lists of 2025's best video games, including Associated Press, Rolling Stone, Empire, Time, IGN, GameSpot, Game Informer, GamesRadar+, Esquire, TechRadar and Destructoid. It won the "Game of the Year", "Best RPG" and "Best PC/Console Game" distinctions, as well as the "Popular Vote", at the Thailand Game Awards in October 2025. It won the "Users' Choice Award" at the PlayStation Partner Awards 2025 Japan/Asia, awarded to the Top 5 titles released in the Japan/Asia region between October 2024 and September 2025 and selected by user votes in said region out of the Top 30 titles with the longest total game play time. At the IGN Community Awards, the game was voted "Best Game of 2025" and won several other accolades. At the PlayStation Blog Game of the Year awards, it emerged victorious in the "Best Story", "Best Soundtrack" and "Best Independent Game" categories.

The game initially won the "Indie Game of the Year" and "Indie Debut Game" awards at the 2025 Indie Game Awards on 18 December. However, it was disqualified two days later as a result of having released with a placeholder texture made with generative artificial intelligence; the latter taking the form of background newspaper clippings on a lamppost. While the developers replaced it five days after release with the correct artist-created texture when it was brought to their attention, its initial inclusion was enough for the Indie Game Awards to rescind the two awards; the organizers citing "hard stance" on generative AI as to their awards event. Each award went to the next highest-ranked game in the two categories (Blue Prince was given the Indie Game of the Year distinction and Sorry We're Closed, that of Indie Debut Game). On the matter, Sandfall declared that when generative AI tools rose to prominence in 2022, some members of the team briefly experimented with them to generate temporary placeholder textures that were always intended to be replaced with human-created ones but the aforementioned newspaper clippings woefully slipped past the quality assurance (QA) process. The studio further clarified that there are no assets created with generative AI in the game, with said placeholder removed and replaced with the intended visual asset as soon as the team was notified of it back in April, as underlined in their 29 April's update summary. Broche emphasized that production of their game had already begun when the members of the team transiently tested these brand new tools to assess their capabilities and determine their relevance to their work, and that no concept art or anything else was made with generative AI. He reiterated the use of these tools in 2022 was brief and was abandoned back then due to dissatisfaction with the technology's output and ethical concerns over its inner workings soon arising; and reaffirmed everything in the game was made by humans. Notwithstanding this one setback, the title's standing remained resilient among its player base, critics and peers alike. The controversy did not eclipse the game's broader momentum and commercial success; Expedition 33 winning over 100 additional "Game of the Year" accolades by the end of January 2026.

In Japan, it was ranked No. 1 in the yearly Famitsu Most Popular Game Awards voted by over 190 Japanese game creators and celebrity gamers (voice actors, TV personalities, etc.) for the publication's Christmas issue. Each individual selects up to five games they were hooked on in 2025. Points are awarded based on their placement in the rankings submitted; the points scored by every single game that earned a mention are then tallied to create the overall ranking. Expedition 33 was named as their No. 1 pick by various developers who were also featured in the subsequent 4Gamer year-end article on 27 December (namely Junzo Hosoi, Naoki Hamaguchi, Kazuyuki Yamai, Toshihiro Kondo, Tetsuya Fukuhara and Satoru Nihei), in addition to the likes of Square Enix's Masashi Takahashi (Octopath Traveler II and Bravely Default II producer) and Konami's Noriaki Okamura (Metal Gear Solid Delta: Snake Eater producer). Although not selected as their No. 1 pick, many other eminent figures of the Japanese video game industry also designated the game among their respective Top 5 favorite titles played in 2025, including Level-5's president and CEO Akihiro Hino (Dragon Quest VIII, Dragon Quest IX, Dark Chronicle and Dark Cloud director), Team Ninja's head Fumihiko Yasuda (Nioh series and Rise of the Rōnin director), Junko Kawano (Suikoden IV and Suikoden Tactics writer and producer), Jun Maeda (Clannad, Air and Kanon director), Takayuki Nakayama (Street Fighter 6 director) and Kohei Ikeda (Tekken 7 and Tekken 8 co-director).

At the 29th Annual D.I.C.E. Awards in February 2026, Clair Obscur: Expedition 33 was nominated for eight awards by the Academy of Interactive Arts & Sciences and won five of them, including Game of the Year. Likewise, it won Game of the Year and four additional awards out of the nine it was nominated for at the 26th Game Developers Choice Awards in March 2026. Finally, at the 22nd British Academy Games Awards in April 2026, it won three of the twelve awards it was nominated for, including Best Game of 2025. With its accolades a few months prior at The Game Awards and Golden Joystick Awards, Clair Obscur: Expedition 33 thus became the second game in history after Baldur's Gate 3 to win the "Game of the Year" recognition from each of the industry's five major awards ceremonies.

By the end of that awards season that drew to a close in the first semester of 2026, the game had won over 500 "Game of the Year" awards from awards ceremonies and outlets alike, a record-shattering number that left every other game released in 2025 behind.

Year	Award	Category	Result	Ref.
2024	Golden Joystick Awards	Most Wanted Game	Nominated	
2025	World Soundtrack Awards	Game Music Award (Lorien Testard)	Won	
2025	TIGA Awards	Action and Adventure	Nominated	
2025	TIGA Awards	Narrative/Storytelling	Won	
2025	Japan Game Awards	Breakthrough Award	Won	
2025	Golden Joystick Awards	Ultimate Game of the Year	Won	
2025	Golden Joystick Awards	Best Storytelling	Won	
2025	Golden Joystick Awards	Best Visual Design	Won	
2025	Golden Joystick Awards	Best Soundtrack	Won	
2025	Golden Joystick Awards	Best Lead Performer (Jennifer English)	Won	
2025	Golden Joystick Awards	Best Supporting Performer (Ben Starr)	Won	
2025	The Game Awards 2025	Game of the Year	Won	
2025	The Game Awards 2025	Best Game Direction	Won	
2025	The Game Awards 2025	Best Narrative	Won	
2025	The Game Awards 2025	Best Art Direction	Won	
2025	The Game Awards 2025	Best Score and Music (Lorien Testard)	Won	
2025	The Game Awards 2025	Best Audio Design	Nominated	
2025	The Game Awards 2025	Best Performance (Jennifer English)	Won	
2025	The Game Awards 2025	Best Performance (Ben Starr)	Nominated	
2025	The Game Awards 2025	Best Performance (Charlie Cox)	Nominated	
2025	The Game Awards 2025	Best Role Playing Game	Won	
2025	The Game Awards 2025	Best Independent Game	Won	
2025	The Game Awards 2025	Best Debut Indie Game	Won	
2025	The Game Awards 2025	Players' Voice	Nominated	
2025	The Steam Awards	Game of the Year	Nominated	
2025	The Steam Awards	Best Soundtrack	Won	
2025	The Streamer Awards	Stream Game of the Year	Nominated	
2026	15th New York Game Awards	Big Apple Award for Best Game of the Year	Won	
2026	15th New York Game Awards	Great White Way Award for Best Acting in a Game (Jennifer English)	Won	
2026	15th New York Game Awards	Tin Pan Alley Award for Best Music in a Game	Nominated	
2026	29th Annual D.I.C.E. Awards	Game of the Year	Won	
2026	29th Annual D.I.C.E. Awards	Role-Playing Game of the Year	Won	
2026	29th Annual D.I.C.E. Awards	Outstanding Achievement in Game Direction	Won	
2026	29th Annual D.I.C.E. Awards	Outstanding Achievement in Art Direction	Won	
2026	29th Annual D.I.C.E. Awards	Outstanding Achievement in Story	Won	
2026	29th Annual D.I.C.E. Awards	Outstanding Achievement in Character (Esquie)	Nominated	
2026	29th Annual D.I.C.E. Awards	Outstanding Achievement in Character (Maelle)	Nominated	
2026	29th Annual D.I.C.E. Awards	Outstanding Achievement in Original Music Composition	Nominated	
2026	7th Pégases	Best Video Game	Won	
2026	7th Pégases	Excellence in Narrative	Won	
2026	7th Pégases	Excellence in Visuals	Won	
2026	7th Pégases	Best Audio	Won	
2026	24th Game Audio Network Guild Awards	Audio of the Year	Nominated	
2026	24th Game Audio Network Guild Awards	Best New Original IP Audio	Won	
2026	24th Game Audio Network Guild Awards	Best Cinematic & Cutscene Audio	Nominated	
2026	24th Game Audio Network Guild Awards	Music of the Year	Won	
2026	24th Game Audio Network Guild Awards	Best Original Soundtrack Album	Won	
2026	24th Game Audio Network Guild Awards	Best Main Theme	Won	
2026	24th Game Audio Network Guild Awards	Best Original Song ("Lumière" by Lorien Testard & Alice Duport-Percier)	Won	
2026	24th Game Audio Network Guild Awards	Sound Design of the Year	Nominated	
2026	24th Game Audio Network Guild Awards	Best Ensemble Cast Performance	Won	
2026	24th Game Audio Network Guild Awards	Dialogue of the Year	Nominated	
2026	26th Game Developers Choice Awards	Game of the Year	Won	
2026	26th Game Developers Choice Awards	Best Debut	Won	
2026	26th Game Developers Choice Awards	Best Design	Nominated	
2026	26th Game Developers Choice Awards	Innovation Award	Nominated	
2026	26th Game Developers Choice Awards	Best Narrative	Won	
2026	26th Game Developers Choice Awards	Best Technology	Nominated	
2026	26th Game Developers Choice Awards	Best Visual Art	Won	
2026	26th Game Developers Choice Awards	Best Audio	Won	
2026	26th Game Developers Choice Awards	Audience Award	Nominated	
2026	22nd British Academy Games Awards	Best Game	Won	
2026	22nd British Academy Games Awards	Artistic Achievement	Nominated	
2026	22nd British Academy Games Awards	Audio Achievement	Nominated	
2026	22nd British Academy Games Awards	Debut Game	Won	
2026	22nd British Academy Games Awards	Game Design	Nominated	
2026	22nd British Academy Games Awards	Music	Nominated	
2026	22nd British Academy Games Awards	Narrative	Nominated	
2026	22nd British Academy Games Awards	New Intellectual Property	Nominated	
2026	22nd British Academy Games Awards	Performer in a Leading Role (Ben Starr)	Nominated	
2026	22nd British Academy Games Awards	Performer in a Leading Role (Jennifer English)	Won	
2026	22nd British Academy Games Awards	Performer in a Supporting Role (Charlie Cox)	Nominated	
2026	22nd British Academy Games Awards	Performer in a Supporting Role (Kirsty Rider)	Nominated	
2026	22nd British Academy Games Awards	Animation	Longlisted	
2026	22nd British Academy Games Awards	Game Beyond Entertainment	Longlisted	
2026	22nd British Academy Games Awards	Technical Achievement	Longlisted	
2026	22nd British Academy Games Awards	Performer in a Supporting Role (Andy Serkis)	Longlisted	
2026	22nd British Academy Games Awards	Performer in a Supporting Role (Rich Keeble)	Longlisted	
2026	Hugo Awards	Best Game or Interactive Work	Won	
2026	Nebula Awards	Game Writing (Guillaume Broche & Jennifer Svedberg-Yen)	Won	
2026	NAVGTR Awards 2025	Game of the Year	Won	
2026	NAVGTR Awards 2025	Animation, Artistic	Nominated	
2026	NAVGTR Awards 2025	Animation, Technical	Won	
2026	NAVGTR Awards 2025	Art Direction, Fantasy	Nominated	
2026	NAVGTR Awards 2025	Camera Direction in a Game Engine	Nominated	
2026	NAVGTR Awards 2025	Control Design, 3D	Nominated	
2026	NAVGTR Awards 2025	Costume Design	Won	
2026	NAVGTR Awards 2025	Game, Original Role Playing	Won	
2026	NAVGTR Awards 2025	Graphics, Technical	Nominated	
2026	NAVGTR Awards 2025	Lighting/Texturing	Nominated	
2026	NAVGTR Awards 2025	Original Dramatic Score, New IP	Won	
2026	NAVGTR Awards 2025	Performance in a Drama, Lead (Charlie Cox as Gustave)	Nominated	
2026	NAVGTR Awards 2025	Performance in a Drama, Lead (Jennifer English as Maelle)	Nominated	
2026	NAVGTR Awards 2025	Performance in a Drama, Supporting (Ben Starr as Verso)	Won	
2026	NAVGTR Awards 2025	Performance in a Drama, Supporting (Andy Serkis as Renoir)	Nominated	
2026	NAVGTR Awards 2025	Song, Original or Adapted (Alicia)	Nominated	
2026	NAVGTR Awards 2025	Song, Original or Adapted (Lumière)	Nominated	
2026	NAVGTR Awards 2025	Use of Sound, New IP	Won	
2026	NAVGTR Awards 2025	Writing in a Drama	Won	
2026	Develop:Star Awards 2026	Best Game	Won	
2026	Develop:Star Awards 2026	Best Audio	Won	
2026	Develop:Star Awards 2026	Best Visual Art	Nominated	
2026	Develop:Star Awards 2026	Best Game Design	Nominated	
2026	Develop:Star Awards 2026	Best Narrative	Won	
2026	Develop:Star Awards 2026	Best Marketing Campaign	Nominated	

== Future ==
=== Franchise ===
Broche has expressed the studio aims to develop sequels or games similar in spirit, confirming Clair Obscur is the name of an intended franchise and Expedition 33 one of its titles; though he was unsure whether these would narratively continue from Expedition 33.

=== Film adaptation ===
In January 2025, a live-action adaptation of the game was announced to be in development by American independent production company Story Kitchen, in collaboration with Sandfall. As various gaming netizens had expressed shock that an unreleased game was getting a movie, the producers and co-founders of the company would later explain in an interview with Polygon in mid-April 2025 that the project originates with the beat 'em up game Sifu developed by Sloclap and co-published with Kepler, which Story Kitchen pitched to Netflix during the 2023 Hollywood labor disputes as to a film adaptation. Impressed by the successful pitch and the streaming giant greenlighting a deal so quickly, Kepler opened up its entire release slate through 2027 to the production company, asking what project they would potentially be interested in tackling next. This led Story Kitchen directly to Expedition 33, which they deemed an immediate standout.

Voicing their excitement about the game's upcoming launch in late April, the producers declared the deal was actually the culmination of a two-year-long, side-by-side collaboration between the producers and Sandfall. Long before the public announcement, Story Kitchen asserted it had built an "inside-out" understanding of Expedtion 33 by thoroughly vetting the narrative, atmosphere and gameplay, i.e., reading the hundreds of pages of the game's script, listening to the entire original soundtrack and playing through its build iterations multiple times. Rather than waiting to see if a game becomes a hit, the producers claim to pitch projects purely on creative merit—focusing on unique worldbuilding and strong storytelling. They expressed that because Expedition 33 "triggered that special thing", they bypassed the standard wait-and-see approach to immediately assemble a live-action film package.

== Impact and legacy ==
=== Fandom ===
Two cosplayers portraying the character Lune, in her swimsuit and her expedition uniform respectively, at Dragon Con 2025 (left); and cosplayers in the familiar "Baguette Outfit" at Fan Expo Denver 2026 (right)

Expedition 33 rapidly cultivated a highly engaged and passionate community around the world. Cosplays depicting the characters—incorporating elements stereotypically associated to French culture such as the marinière, the baguette and the beret—have become a common sight at gaming and multigenre conventions, with players routinely forming massive queues just to meet the developers or cast, sharing personal stories about how the game impacted them. Many amateur artists have shared illustrations, stickers, plush toys, music covers, and sculptures created as a tribute to the game’s universe; which include the production of highly detailed, large-scale visual creations, ranging from massive full-canvas paintings of the game's world to meticulous, custom-drawn maps of Lumière. Many others flood Archive of Our Own (AO3) with dedicated fan fiction, while thousands of videos dissect a plot full of twists and turns and explore the theme of grief.

The game’s twisted Belle Époque aesthetic—featuring a dilapidated Eiffel Tower in the city of Lumière, Art Nouveau geometry, and creepy mimes—sparked a massive wave of viral deep dives on social media platforms, with content creators breaking down its references to impressionist painter Pierre-Auguste Renoir, the Lumière brothers, and French literature. In fan communities online, the game's design choices quickly turned into inside jokes. Its beach challenges and swimsuit outfits were widely meme'd as a high-prestige, dramatic western take on traditional anime "beach episodes", in addition to being highlighted as direct nods to classic JRPG structure.

Actor Charlie Cox, who voiced Gustave, stated in a GamesRadar+ interview that he was completely blindsided by the "type of passion" fans showed, and had no idea players could mourn a video game character's story arc as deeply as they would a live-action TV or movie icon. Universally recognized as Matt Murdock from the Marvel's Daredevil and accustomed to 95% of the attendees visiting his booth at conventions doing so specifically for his live-action superhero work, he expressed astonishment at the sudden emergence of a whole new fanbase—individuals whose intense devotion to digital characters fully mirrors the historic obsession reserved for mainstream film and television—admitting the rapid transition was "shocking".

=== Music ===
The game's soundtrack album received unanimous praise from critics and independently enjoyed unusual commercial success by industry standards, reaching official top chart positions in many countries and amassing well above 600 million track streams by the time of the game's first anniversary.

Expedition 33's soundtrack album is the highest-charting video game soundtrack album in history in major countries such as France, the United Kingdom and Germany. It is also the second highest-charting game soundtrack album ever in the United States, only behind the BTS World: Original Soundtrack. Having debuted at No. 29 on the overall Billboard 200 upon the release of the album's vinyl and CD editions in February 2026, Expedition 33's soundtrack is—alongside the BTS World: Original Soundtrack (No. 26) and the Halo 4 Original Soundtrack (No. 50)—one of only three game soundtrack albums to have reached the Top 50 of the Billboard 200 since the latter began publishing weekly in March 1956. During the launch week of the physical formats, the vinyl editions alone sold 24,000 copies in the United States, representing the largest single sales week for a video game soundtrack on vinyl in the country since electronic sales tracking began in 1991.

After a fully booked French mini-tour in October 2025, followed by a sold-out full-scale European tour from March to July 2026, a third and expanded international tour was announced in September 2026. The latter brought live performances to the United States for the first time, as well as to the largest indoor arenas by capacity across Europe; selling out the likes of the Ziggo Dome in the Netherlands, Palau Sant Jordi in Spain, Tauron Arena Kraków in Poland, LDLC Arena in France, The O2 Arena in the UK, and Uber Arena in Germany.

=== Art ===
Pix'n Love, a French publisher specializing in books showcasing the art direction of video games, released the official art book for the game, titled L’Art de Clair Obscur: Expedition 33 (The Art Clair Obscur: Expedition 33 for the English-language translated version), in December 2025. Its sales far outpaced those of previous art books published by the company. As a result, the release date of the collector’s edition of the book had to be delayed due to the overwhelming number of orders, as Pix'n Love could not deliver all copies on time.

Artwork and concepts from Clair Obscur: Expedition 33 were exhibited at the Musée d'Orsay from 23 June to 19 July 2026. The high-profile fine-arts showcase featured in-game captures, preliminary sketches, and unseen concept art by Nicholas Maxson-Francombe and the other artists of the development team, displayed alongside the museum's Belle Époque collections and the "Renoir and Love" exhibition to highlight the game's classical artistic inspirations. Beyond this prestigious art exhibition, artwork from Expedition 33 has also notably been featured at the Hôtel de Ville de Montpellier. Organized directly by the city of Montpellier in collaboration with the studio, this expo—titled "Clair Obscur: Expedition 33 – La toile aux rêves" (Clair Obscur: Expedition 33 – The Canvas of Dreams)—was open to the public for free from 6 October to 13 November 2026 and highlighted a vast array of the game's concept art, character sheets, and creative lore.

=== Honors ===
The members of the Sandfall team were knighted under the Ordre des Arts et des Lettres (Order of Arts and Letters) in February 2026 by the French Ministry of Culture in recognition of their achievements and their game's contribution to the promotion of French culture.
