= Nocco =

Nocco is an Italian surname. Notable people with the surname include:

- Alessandro Nocco (born 1997), Italian motorcycle racer
- Ernesto Nocco (born 1957), Italian sprinter
- Giuseppe Nocco (1939–2025), Italian politician

== See also ==
- NOCCO (energy drink), a Swedish energy drink brand
- Noco (disambiguation)
