= NOCO =

NOCO may refer to:

- The NOCO Company, a battery product manufacturer
- NOCO Energy Corporation, an energy company
- NoCo, an alternative rock band
- Northern Colorado
- NoCo, the fictional ship between Noah and Cody from Total Drama

== See also ==
- Nocco
