= List of Fire Force episodes =

Key visual for the series

Fire Force is an anime television series based on the manga series Fire Force by Atsushi Ohkubo. An anime series adaptation produced by David Production was announced in November 2018. The first season is directed by Yuki Yase, with Yamato Haijima handling scripts, Hideyuki Morioka designing the characters and Kenichiro Suehiro composing the music. The season aired from July 6 to December 28, 2019, on the Super Animeism programming block on all JNN affiliates, including MBS and TBS, and ran for 24 episodes. (Note: MBS and TBS listed the series premiere as airing on July 5 at 25:25, which is effectively July 6 at 1:25 a.m. JST.) Crunchyroll licensed the series for streaming. Due to the Kyoto Animation arson attack on July 19, 2019, the third episode, which was originally scheduled to air on July 20, was postponed and aired a week later on July 27. In July 2019, it was announced that the series would premiere on Adult Swim's Toonami programming block on July 28 of the same year.

A second season, directed and written by Tatsuma Minamikawa, aired from July 4 to December 12, 2020. (Note: MBS and TBS listed the season premiere as airing on July 3 at 25:55, which is effectively July 4 at 1:55 a.m. JST.)

A third season was announced in May 2022. In July 2024 at Anime Expo, it was announced that the third season would also be its final and run in two split cours. The first cours aired from April 5 to June 21, 2025, (Note: MBS, TBS and CBC listed the season premiere as airing on April 4 at 25:53, which is effectively April 5 at 1:53 a.m. JST.) while the second cours aired from January 10 to April 4, 2026. (Note: MBS, TBS and CBC listed the second cours premiere as airing on January 9 at 25:53, which is effectively January 10 at 1:53 a.m. JST.) Sei Tsuguta replaces Tatsuma Minamikawa as series composition writer for the season, while the latter returns as series director.

== Series overview ==
Season	Episodes		Originally released	
Season	Episodes		First released	Last released
1	24		July 6, 2019	December 28, 2019
2	24		July 4, 2020	December 12, 2020
3	25	12	April 5, 2025	June 21, 2025
3	25	13	January 10, 2026	April 4, 2026

== Episodes ==
=== Season 1 (2019) ===
No. overall	No. in season	Title	Directed by	Written by	Storyboarded by	Original release date	English air date
1	1	"Shinra Kusakabe Enlists"; Transliteration: "Shinra Kusakabe, Nyūtai" (Japanese: 森羅 日下部、入隊)	Yuki Yase	Yamato Haijima	Yuki Yase	July 6, 2019	July 28, 2019
2	2	"The Heart of a Fire Soldier"; Transliteration: "Shōbō-kan no Kokoro" (Japanese: 消防官の心)	Shuntarō Tozawa	Yoriko Tomita & Yamato Haijima	Hiroko Kazui	July 13, 2019	August 4, 2019
3	3	"The Rookie Fire Soldier Games"; Transliteration: "Shōbō-kan Shinjin Taikai" (Japanese: 消防官新人大会)	Hideya Itō	Yoriko Tomita & Yamato Haijima	Katsumi Terahigashi	July 27, 2019 (Note: Due to the Kyoto Animation arson attack which occurred on July 18, 2019, episode 3 was postponed by one week.)	August 11, 2019
4	4	"The Hero and the Princess"; Transliteration: "Hīrō to Hime" (Japanese: ヒーローと姫)	Shuntarō Tozawa	Yamato Haijima	Shuntarō Tozawa & Mamoru Kurosawa	August 3, 2019	August 18, 2019
5	5	"The Battle Begins"; Transliteration: "Kaisen" (Japanese: 開戦)	Yūji Tokuno	Yoriko Tomita	Yūji Tokuno	August 10, 2019	August 25, 2019
6	6	"The Spark of Promise"; Transliteration: "Yakusoku no Hibana" (Japanese: 約束の火華)	Kazuomi Koga	Yamato Haijima	Mamoru Kurosawa	August 17, 2019	September 1, 2019
7	7	"The Investigation of the 1st Commences"; Transliteration: "Dai Ichi Chōsa Kaishi" (Japanese: 第1調査開始)	Masaru Kitamura	Yoriko Tomita	Takashi Kawabata	August 24, 2019	September 8, 2019
8	8	"Infernal Insects"; Transliteration: "Homura no Mushi" (Japanese: 焰の蟲)	Shuntarō Tozawa	Yoriko Tomita	Hiroko Kazui	August 31, 2019	September 15, 2019
9	9	"The Spreading Malice"; Transliteration: "Moehirogaru Akui" (Japanese: 燃え拡がる悪意)	Yūji Tokuno	Yamato Haijima	Katsumi Terahigashi	September 7, 2019	September 22, 2019
10	10	"The Promise"; Transliteration: "Yakusoku" (Japanese: 約束)	Shūji Miyazaki	Yamato Haijima	Yūji Tokuno	September 14, 2019	October 6, 2019
11	11	"Formation of Special Fire Force Company 8"; Transliteration: "Dai Hachi Tokushu Shōbō-tai Kessei" (Japanese: 第8特殊消防隊結成)	Yūshi Ibe	Yoriko Tomita	Akitoshi Yokoyama	September 21, 2019	October 13, 2019
11	11	"The Mightiest Hikeshi"; Transliteration: "Saikyō no Hikeshi" (Japanese: 最強の火消し)	Yūshi Ibe	Yoriko Tomita	Akitoshi Yokoyama	September 21, 2019	October 13, 2019
12	12	"Eve of Hostilities in Asakusa"; Transliteration: "Asakusa Kaisen Zen'ya" (Japanese: 浅草開戦前夜)	Tatsuma Minamikawa	Yoriko Tomita	Satoshi Nakagawa	October 12, 2019	October 20, 2019
13	13	"The Trap Is Set"; Transliteration: "Shikumareta Wana" (Japanese: 仕組まれた罠)	Ryōta Aikei	Yoriko Tomita	Mamoru Kurosawa	October 19, 2019	October 27, 2019
14	14	"For Whom the Flames Burn"; Transliteration: "Dare ga Tame no Honō" (Japanese: 誰が為の炎)	Yūji Tokuno	Yamato Haijima	Katsumi Terahigashi	October 26, 2019	November 3, 2019
15	15	"The Blacksmith's Dream"; Transliteration: "Kajiya no Yume" (Japanese: 鍛冶屋の夢)	Shuntarō Tozawa	Yoriko Tomita	Mamoru Kurosawa & Shuntarō Tozawa	November 2, 2019	November 10, 2019
16	16	"We Are Family"; Transliteration: "Ore-tachi wa Kazoku" (Japanese: 俺たちは家族)	Takahiro Kamei	Mamoru Kurosawa	Mamoru Kurosawa	November 9, 2019	November 17, 2019
17	17	"Black and White and Gray"; Transliteration: "Kuro to Shiro to Haiiro" (Japanese: 黒と白と灰色)	Aya Kobayashi	Yamato Haijima	Hiroko Kazui	November 16, 2019	November 24, 2019
18	18	"The Secrets of Pyrokinesis"; Transliteration: "Hakka no Gokui" (Japanese: 発火の極意)	Yūji Tokuno	Yoriko Tomita	Katsumi Terahigashi	November 23, 2019	December 8, 2019
19	19	"Into the Nether"; Transliteration: "Chika e no" (Japanese: 地下への)	Daisuke Chiba	Yoriko Tomita	Tomohiro Furukawa	November 30, 2019	December 15, 2019
20	20	"Wearing His Pride"; Transliteration: "Hokori o Matotte" (Japanese: 誇りを纏って)	Shuntarō Tozawa	Mamoru Kurosawa	Mamoru Kurosawa	December 7, 2019	January 5, 2020
21	21	"Those Connected"; Transliteration: "Tsunagaru Mono" (Japanese: 繋がる者)	Aya Kobayashi	Yoriko Tomita	Yuki Yase	December 14, 2019	January 12, 2020
22	22	"A Brother's Determination"; Transliteration: "Ani no Iji" (Japanese: 兄の意地)	Shinji Osada	Yamato Haijima	Katsumi Terahigashi	December 21, 2019	January 19, 2020
23	23	"Smile"; Transliteration: "Egao" (Japanese: 笑顔)	Shuntarō Tozawa & Shō Sugawara	Yoriko Tomita	Mamoru Kurosawa	December 28, 2019 (Note: Episodes 23 and 24 aired back-to-back as a one-hour special.)	January 26, 2020
24	24	"The Burning Past"; Transliteration: "Moyuru Kako" (Japanese: 燃ゆる過去)	Yuki Yase	Yamato Haijima	Mamoru Kurosawa & Yuki Yase	December 28, 2019	February 2, 2020

=== Season 2 (2020) ===
No. overall	No. in season	Title	Directed by (Note: Production staff information is taken from the ending credits of each episode.)	Written by	Storyboarded by	Original release date	English air date
25	1	"A Fire Soldier's Fight"; Transliteration: "Shōbō-kan no Tatakai" (Japanese: 消防官の戦い)	Tatsuma Minamikawa	Ken'ichirō Yano	Tatsuma Minamikawa	July 4, 2020	November 8, 2020
25	1	"A Man's Fight"; Transliteration: "Otoko no Tatakai" (Japanese: 男の戦い)	Tatsuma Minamikawa	Ken'ichirō Yano	Tatsuma Minamikawa	July 4, 2020	November 8, 2020
26	2	"Flames of Madness"; Transliteration: "Kyōki no Honō" (Japanese: 狂気の炎)	Shuntarō Tozawa	Yoriko Tomita	Mamoru Kurosawa	July 11, 2020	November 15, 2020
27	3	"A New Flashpoint"; Transliteration: "Aratana Hidane" (Japanese: 新たな火種)	Shō Sugawara	Yoriko Tomita	Jirō Fujimoto	July 18, 2020	November 22, 2020
28	4	"Groping Through the Fire"; Transliteration: "Kachū Mosaku" (Japanese: 火中模索)	Tetsuji Nakamura	Yoriko Tomita	Tetsuji Nakamura	July 25, 2020	December 6, 2020
29	5	"Corna (Sign of the Devil)"; Transliteration: "Koruna (Akuma no Kata)" (Japanese: 悪魔の型(コルナ))	Kyōhei Suzuki	Ken'ichirō Yano	Toshiyuki Katō	August 1, 2020	December 13, 2020
29	5	"A Secret Plan"; Transliteration: "Hisaku" (Japanese: 秘策)	Kyōhei Suzuki	Ken'ichirō Yano	Toshiyuki Katō	August 1, 2020	December 13, 2020
30	6	"The Time to Choose"; Transliteration: "Sentaku no Toki" (Japanese: 選択の時)	Daishi Katō	Ken'ichirō Yano	Shinji Itadaki	August 8, 2020	January 3, 2021
31	7	"Road to the Oasis"; Transliteration: "Rakuen e no Michi" (Japanese: 楽園への道)	Shuntarō Tozawa	Yoriko Tomita	Mamoru Kurosawa	August 15, 2020	January 10, 2021
32	8	"Smoldering Malevolence"; Transliteration: "Moe Hisomu Akui" (Japanese: 燃え潜む悪意)	Ryōta Aikei	Yoriko Tomita	Ryōta Aikei	August 22, 2020	January 17, 2021
33	9	"The Core"; Transliteration: "Kakushin" (Japanese: 核心)	Yūya Horiuchi	Yoriko Tomita	Hiroko Kazui	August 29, 2020	January 24, 2021
34	10	"The Woman in Black"; Transliteration: "Kuro no On'na" (Japanese: 黒の女)	Tetsuji Nakamura	Ken'ichirō Yano	Tetsuji Nakamura	September 5, 2020	January 31, 2021
35	11	"Dark Hero"; Transliteration: "Dāku Hīrō" (Japanese: ダークヒーロー)	Jun'ichirō Hashiguchi	Ken'ichirō Yano	Katsumi Terahigashi	September 12, 2020	February 7, 2021
36	12	"Shadows Cast by Divine Light"; Transliteration: "Shinkō ga Umu Kage" (Japanese: 神光が生む影)	Shuntarō Tozawa	Yoriko Tomita	Yasufumi Soejima	September 19, 2020	February 14, 2021
37	13	"A Pair of One-Eyes"; Transliteration: "Tai no Sekigan" (Japanese: 対の隻眼)	Daisuke Chiba	Yoriko Tomita	Jirō Fujimoto	September 26, 2020	February 21, 2021
38	14	"The Ashen Reaper"; Transliteration: "Hai no Shinigami" (Japanese: 灰の死神)	Daishi Katō	Ken'ichirō Yano	Shinji Itadaki	October 3, 2020	February 28, 2021
39	15	"A Three-Way Melee"; Transliteration: "San-Shoku Konsen" (Japanese: 三色混戦)	Shō Sugawara	Ken'ichirō Yano	Mamoru Kurosawa	October 10, 2020	March 7, 2021
40	16	"Mind Blown"; Transliteration: "Bakuhatsu Suru Kokoro" (Japanese: 爆発する心)	Jun'ichirō Hashiguchi	Ken'ichirō Yano	Jun'ichirō Hashiguchi	October 17, 2020	March 14, 2021
41	17	"Boys, Be Weak"; Transliteration: "Shōnen'yo, Yowaku Are" (Japanese: 少年よ、弱くあれ)	Ryōta Aikei	Yoriko Tomita	Ryōta Aikei	October 24, 2020	March 21, 2021
42	18	"The Holy Woman's Anguish"; Transliteration: "Seijo no Kunō" (Japanese: 聖女の苦悩)	Makoto Katō	Yoriko Tomita	Makoto Katō	October 31, 2020	March 28, 2021
42	18	"The Man, Assault"; Transliteration: "Otoko, Asaruto" (Japanese: 男、突撃(アサルト))	Makoto Katō	Yoriko Tomita	Makoto Katō	October 31, 2020	March 28, 2021
43	19	"The Oze Family"; Transliteration: "Oze Ichimon" (Japanese: 尾瀬一門)	Tetsuji Nakamura	Ken'ichirō Yano	Tetsuji Nakamura	November 7, 2020	April 4, 2021
44	20	"Weapon of Destruction"; Transliteration: "Hakai Heiki" (Japanese: 破壊兵器)	Jun'ichirō Hashiguchi	Ken'ichirō Yano	Jun'ichirō Hashiguchi	November 14, 2020	April 11, 2021
45	21	"Enemy Contact"; Transliteration: "Setteki" (Japanese: 接敵)	Shō Sugawara	Yoriko Tomita	Katsumi Terahigashi	November 21, 2020	April 18, 2021
46	22	"Plot for Extinction"; Transliteration: "Metsubō no Takurami" (Japanese: 滅亡の企み)	Ryōta Aikei	Yoriko Tomita	Yasufumi Soejima	November 28, 2020	April 25, 2021
47	23	"Firecat"; Transliteration: "En'byō" (Japanese: 炎猫(えんびょう))	Shuntarō Tozawa	Ken'ichirō Yano	Mamoru Kurosawa	December 5, 2020	May 2, 2021
48	24	"Signs of Upheaval"; Transliteration: "Gekidō no Kizashi" (Japanese: 激動の兆し)	Tatsuma Minamikawa	Ken'ichirō Yano	Tatsuma Minamikawa	December 12, 2020	May 9, 2021

=== Season 3 (2025–2026) ===
Note: All episodes from this season were written by Sei Tsuguta.

==== Part 1 ====
No. overall	No. in season	Title	Directed by	Storyboarded by	Original release date
49	1	"Indomitable Resolve"; Transliteration: "Futaiten" (Japanese: 不退転)	Tatsuma Minamikawa	Tatsuma Minamikawa	April 5, 2025
50	2	"Prisoner"; Transliteration: "Toraware no Mi" (Japanese: 囚われの身)	Eiichi Kuboyama	Eiichi Kuboyama	April 12, 2025
51	3	"Incarnation of Flame"; Transliteration: "Honō no Keshin" (Japanese: 炎の化身)	Daisuke Chiba	Jirō Fujimoto	April 19, 2025
52	4	"Golden Secret"; Transliteration: "Ōgon no Himitsu" (Japanese: 黄金の秘密)	Fumihiro Ueno	Shinji Itadaki	April 26, 2025
53	5	"Chance Meeting with an Arch-Enemy"; Transliteration: "Shūteki Kaikō" (Japanese: 宿敵邂逅)	Ling Shi Sheng	Kōji Iwai	May 3, 2025
54	6	"Beyond Prayer's End"; Transliteration: "Inori no Hate" (Japanese: 祈りの果て)	Tatsuma Minamikawa	Tatsuma Minamikawa	May 10, 2025
55	7	"Sleeping Truth"; Transliteration: "Nemuru Shinjitsu" (Japanese: 眠る真実)	Yuki Iwasaki	Naoki Kotani	May 17, 2025
56	8	"Holy Mother of Darkness"; Transliteration: "Yami no Seibo" (Japanese: 闇の聖母)	Eiichi Kuboyama	Eiichi Kuboyama	May 24, 2025
56	8	"The Knight King's Great Adventure"; Transliteration: "Kishi-Ō no Daibōken" (Japanese: 騎士王の大冒険)	Eiichi Kuboyama	Eiichi Kuboyama	May 24, 2025
57	9	"Holy Sword, Resurrected"; Transliteration: "Seiken Saitan" (Japanese: 聖剣再誕)	Fumihiro Ueno	Tetsuji Nakamura	May 31, 2025
58	10	"Advent"; Transliteration: "Shutsugen" (Japanese: 出現)	Yuri Uema	Shinji Itadaki	June 7, 2025
59	11	"The Great Kaiju Battlefront"; Transliteration: "Daikaijū Sensen" (Japanese: 大怪獣戦線)	Mitsuki Kitamura	Jirō Fujimoto	June 14, 2025
60	12	"The Madness of the Distant Past"; Transliteration: "Inishie no Kyōki" (Japanese: 古の狂気)	Daisuke Chiba	Kazuki Akane	June 21, 2025

==== Part 2 ====
No. overall	No. in season	Title	Directed by	Storyboarded by	Original release date
61	13	"Unaware"; Transliteration: "Mujikaku" (Japanese: 無自覚)	Takanari Hirayama	Tatsuma Minamikawa	January 10, 2026
62	14	"With the Sun at His Back"; Transliteration: "Nichirin wo Se ni" (Japanese: 日輪を背に)	Mineya Mori & Kento Fukuda	Shinji Itadaki	January 17, 2026
63	15	"Birth"; Transliteration: "Shussei" (Japanese: 出生)	Yuka Aoki	Naoki Kotani	January 24, 2026
64	16	"Savior"; Transliteration: "Kyūseishu" (Japanese: 救世主)	Eiichi Kuboyama	Shinji Itadaki	January 31, 2026
65	17	"At the Center of the World"; Transliteration: "Sekai no Chūshin de" (Japanese: 世界の中心で)	Daisuke Chiba	Kōji Iwai	February 7, 2026
66	18	"Incantation of Destruction"; Transliteration: "Horobi no Jumon" (Japanese: 滅びの呪文)	Tatsuya Kyōgoku	Shinji Itadaki	February 14, 2026
67	19	"Those Who Fight Back"; Transliteration: "Aragau Mono-tachi" (Japanese: 抗う者たち)	Fumihiro Ueno	Jirō Fujimoto	February 21, 2026
67	19	"Apocalyptic Imagination"; Transliteration: "Shūmatsu Imēji" (Japanese: 終末想像(イメージ))	Fumihiro Ueno	Jirō Fujimoto	February 21, 2026
68	20	"Where Hope Is"; Transliteration: "Kibō no Arika" (Japanese: 希望の在処)	Hiroaki Takagi & Taichi Atarashi	Hitomi Tsuruta	February 28, 2026
69	21	"Dragon and Knight Surge Toward the Heavens"; Transliteration: "Ryūki Shōten" (Japanese: 竜騎衝天)	Tatsuya Kyōgoku	Tatsuya Kyōgoku & Mamoru Kurosawa	March 7, 2026
70	22	"Hero Resurrected"; Transliteration: "Hīrō Fukkatsu" (Japanese: ヒーロー復活)	Yuka Aoki	Shinji Itadaki	March 14, 2026
71	23	"Despair Saintess"; Transliteration: "Zetsubō no Seijo" (Japanese: 絶望の聖女)	Jirō Fujimoto	Jirō Fujimoto	March 21, 2026
72	24	"Answer"; Transliteration: "Kotae" (Japanese: 答え)	Mineya Mori	Shinji Itadaki	March 28, 2026
73	25	"Hero's Tale"; Transliteration: "Hīrō no Monogatari" (Japanese: ヒーローの物語)	Tatsuma Minamikawa	Tatsuma Minamikawa	April 4, 2026

== Home media release ==
=== Japanese ===
==== Season 1 ====
DMM.com (Japan – Region 2/A)
Vol.	Episodes	Cover character(s)	Release date	Ref.
1	1–2	Shinra Kusakabe and Arthur Boyle	September 27, 2019	
2	3–6	Akitaru Ōbi and Takehisa Hinawa	October 25, 2019	
3	7–10	Hibana and Iris	November 29, 2019	
4	11–14	Benimaru Shinmon and Konro Sagamiya	December 27, 2019	
5	15–17	Tamaki Kotatsu and Maki Oze	January 31, 2020	
6	18–20	Vulcan Joseph and Viktor Licht	February 28, 2020	
7	21–24	Shinra Kusakabe and Shō Kusakabe	March 27, 2020	

==== Season 2 ====
DMM.com (Japan – Region 2/A)
Vol.	Episodes		Cover character(s)		Release date		Ref.	
Vol.	Blu-ray	DVD	Blu-ray	DVD	Blu-ray	DVD	BD	DVD
1	1–6	1–3	Shinra Kusakabe and Inca Kasugatani	Shinra Kusakabe	September 30, 2020	September 30, 2020		
2	7–12	4–6	Joker and Benimaru Shinmon	Arthur Boyle	October 28, 2020	September 30, 2020		
3	13–18	7–9	Charon, Yūichirō Kurono, Nataku Son and Akitaru Ōbi	Iris	December 23, 2020	October 28, 2020		
4	19–24	10–12	Shinra Kusakabe, Arthur Boyle and Haumea	Maki Oze	January 27, 2021	October 28, 2020		
5	—	13–15	—	Tamaki Kotatsu	—	December 23, 2020	—	
6	—	16–18	—	Viktor Licht and Vulcan Joseph	—	December 23, 2020	—	
7	—	19–21	—	Takehisa Hinawa	—	January 27, 2021	—	
8	—	22–24	—	Akitaru Ōbi	—	January 27, 2021	—	

==== Season 3 ====
DMM.com (Japan – Region 2/A)
Vol.	Episodes	Release date	Ref.
1	1–12	August 8, 2025	
2	13–25	July 8, 2026	

=== English ===
==== Season 1 ====
Crunchyroll, LLC (North America – Region 1/A)
Part	Episodes	Release date	Ref.
1	1–12	March 31, 2020	
2	13–24	September 29, 2020	
Complete	1–24	November 2, 2021	

==== Season 2 ====
Crunchyroll, LLC (North America – Region 1/A)
Part	Episodes	Release date	Ref.
1	1–12	August 3, 2021	
2	13–24	November 2, 2021	
