= NOCCO =

Energy drink

NOCCO Energy Drink
- Type: Energy drink
- Manufacturer: Vitamin Well Group AB
- Distributor: No Carbs Company AB
- Origin: Sweden, Stockholm, Sweden
- Introduced: December 2014; 11 years ago
- Ingredients: Caffeine, BCAA, Sucralose, B-group vitamins, and Carbonated water
- Website: nocco.com

NOCCO (an acronym for No Carbs Company) is a Swedish brand of caffeinated energy drink produced by Vitamin Well Group. It is marketed as a low-calorie, sugar-free functional beverage containing caffeine, branched-chain amino acids (BCAAs), and B vitamins. The drink contains approximately 55 mg of caffeine per 100 ml, which is considerably higher than many mainstream energy drinks.

As of January 2026, NOCCO is sold in 24 countries across three continents.

== Ingredients ==
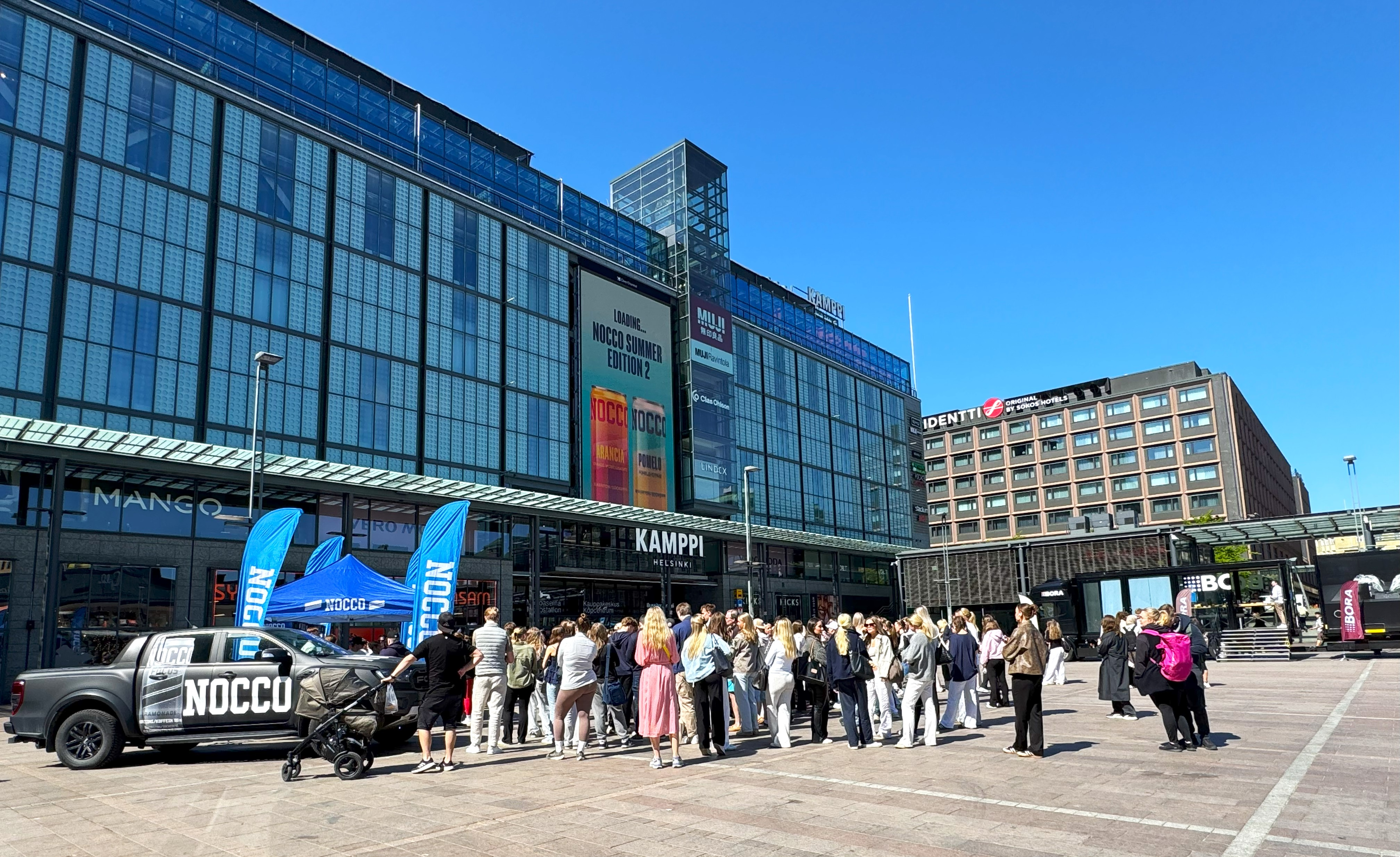
NOCCO promoting it's products at the Narinkka square in Helsinki

NOCCO is a carbonated beverage. The exact composition and caffeine content varies by product, but may include:

- Carbonated water
- Caffeine (55 mg/100 mL)
- Branched-chain amino acids (BCAAs):
  - L-Leucine
  - L-Isoleucine
  - L-Valine
- Vitamin B_{3} (niacin)
- Vitamin B_{6} (pyridoxine hydrochloride)
- Vitamin B_{12}
- Biotin
- Sucralose
- Citric acid
- Folic acid
- Natural and artificial flavourings
- Green tea extract

BCAAs are included to support muscle protein synthesis and recovery. However, research suggests that the amount present in a single serving is likely insufficient to produce a measurable anabolic effect, and that consuming BCAAs alone may not effectively stimulate muscle protein synthesis.

== Safety ==
Like other energy drinks with high caffeine content, NOCCO should be consumed in moderation. It is not recommended for children, teenagers, or pregnant or breastfeeding women.

Excessive consumption may lead to caffeine-related side effects such as insomnia, nervousness, nausea, tachycardia, and palpitations, and may exceed the recommended daily caffeine limit of 400 mg for healthy adults set by health authorities.

As a sugar-free beverage, NOCCO contains artificial sweeteners such as sucralose, the long-term health effects of which continue to be studied.

== See also ==
- List of energy drinks
