= British Academy Games Award for Performer in a Leading Role =

Award

British Academy Video Games Award for Performer in a Leading Role
- Awarded for: Best performance in a game
- Presented by: BAFTA
- First award: 2020
- Currently held by: Jennifer English

Highlights
- Most nominations: Laura Bailey
- Website: www.bafta.org/games

The British Academy Video Games Award for Performer in a Leading Role is an award presented annually by the British Academy of Film and Television Arts (BAFTA) in honour of the best leading performance featured in a game "from voice artistry through to motion capture".

BAFTA has honoured video game performances since the 8th British Academy Video Games Awards ceremony in 2012, with Mark Hamill winning the inaugural award for his performance as the Joker in Batman: Arkham City. From 2012 to 2019, performers in both leading and supporting roles were considered together in the merged category of British Academy Games Award for Performer but, as of the 16th British Academy Games Awards, during a reconfiguration of categories, BAFTA announced that the Performer award would be split into both Leading and Supporting categories.

The inaugural winner in the Leading category was Gonzalo Martin for his role as Sean Diaz in Dontnod Entertainment's Life Is Strange 2. Laura Bailey has received the most nominations with two, one for her role as Kait Diaz in Gears 5 and one for her portrayal of Abby in The Last of Us Part II, which she won.

The current holder of the award is Jennifer English for her role as Maelle in Clair Obscur: Expedition 33, who won at the 22nd British Academy Games Awards in 2026.

== Winners and nominees ==
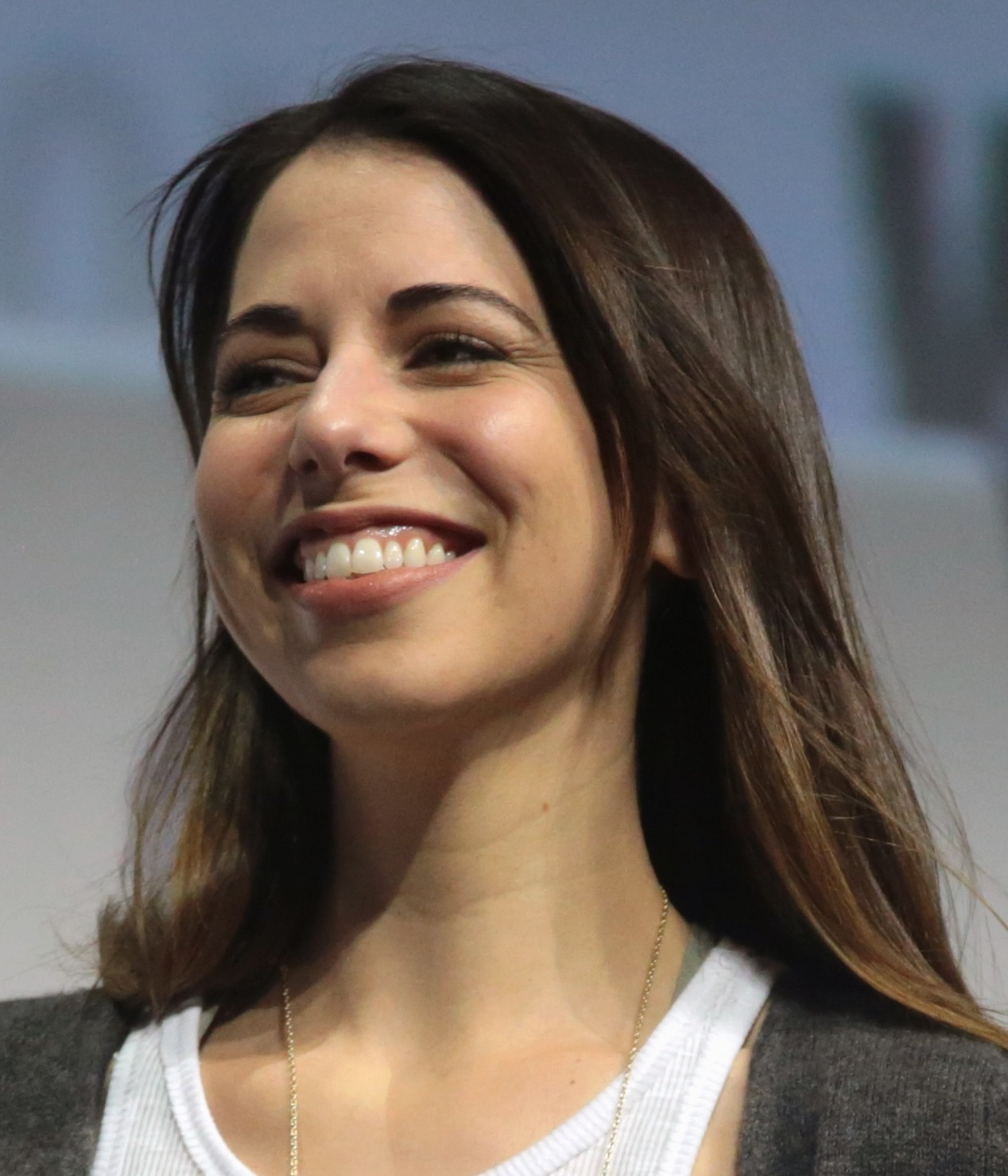
Laura Bailey, two-time nominee and 2020 winner

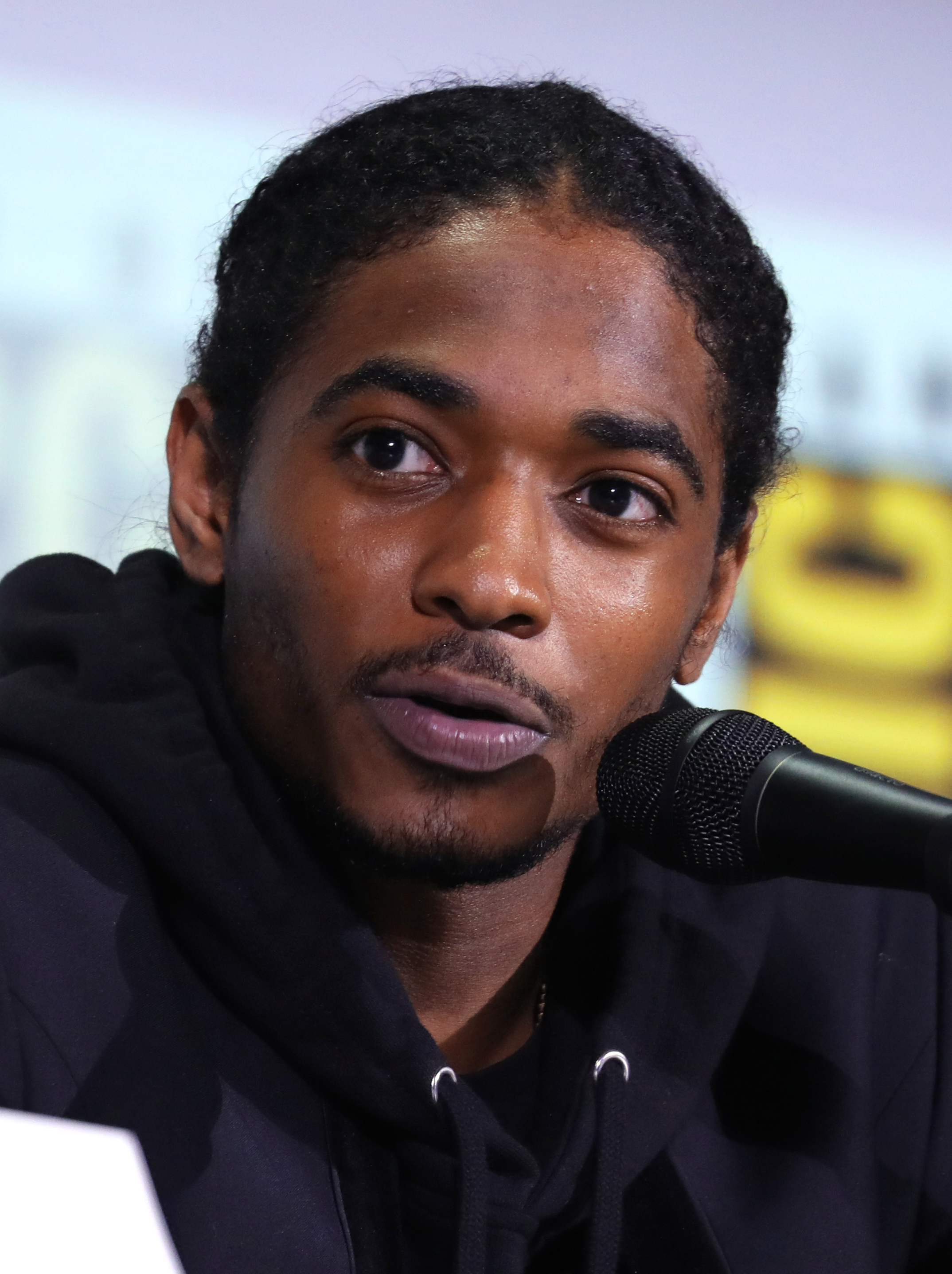
Nadji Jeter, two-time nominee and 2023 winner

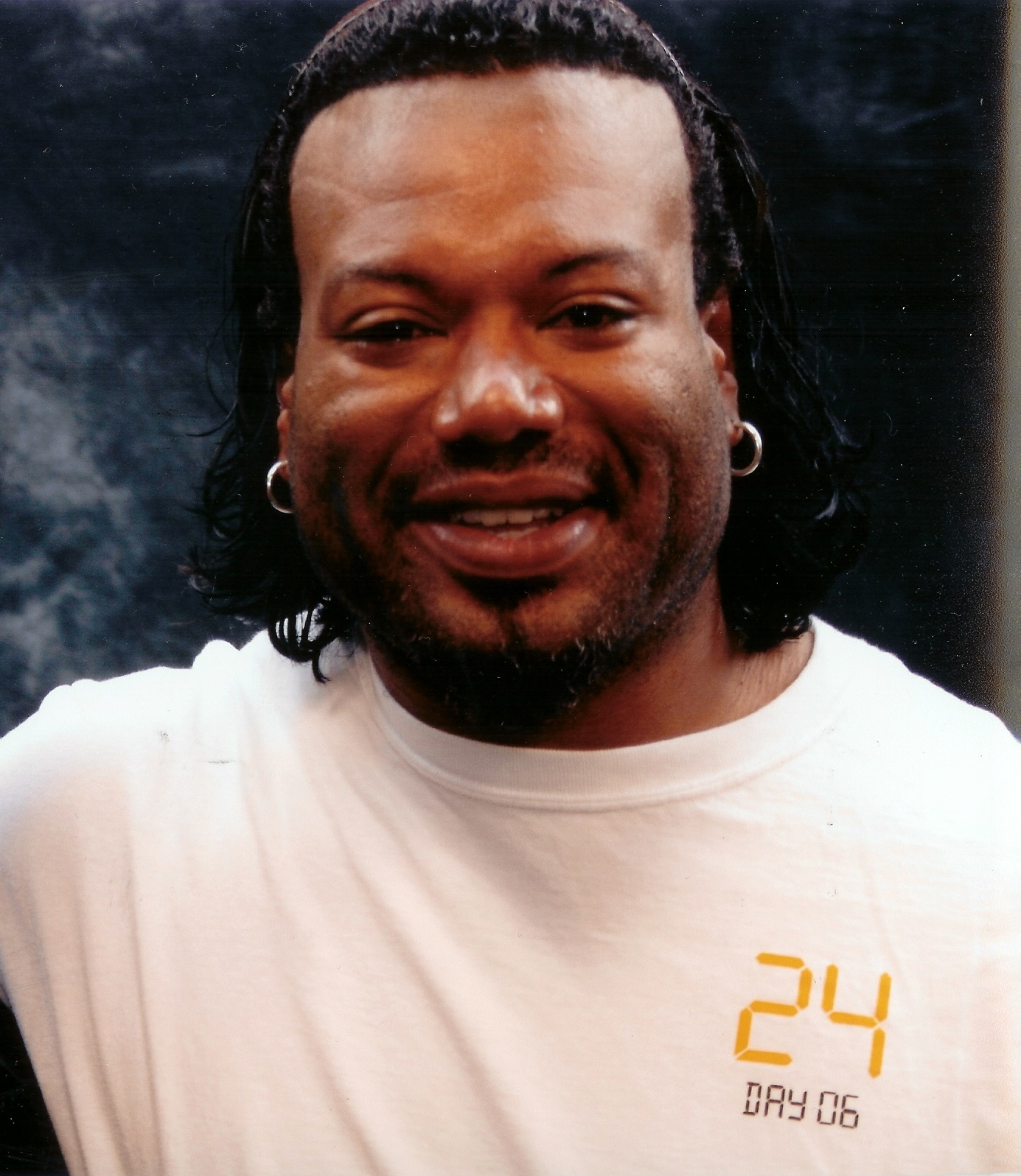
Christopher Judge received the award in 2022.

In the following table, the years are listed as per BAFTA convention, and generally correspond to the year of game release in the United Kingdom.

Table key
Indicates the winner

Year	Performer	Game	Role(s)	Ref.
2019 (16th)	Gonzalo Martin	Life Is Strange 2	Sean Diaz	
2019 (16th)	Laura Bailey	Gears 5	Kait Diaz	
2019 (16th)	Courtney Hope	Control	Jesse Faden	
2019 (16th)	Logan Marshall-Green	Telling Lies	David	
2019 (16th)	Norman Reedus	Death Stranding	Sam Bridges	
2019 (16th)	Barry Sloane	Call of Duty: Modern Warfare	Captain Price	
2020 (17th)
2020 (17th)	Laura Bailey	The Last of Us Part II	Abby	
2020 (17th)	Cody Christian	Final Fantasy VII Remake	Cloud Strife	
2020 (17th)	Nadji Jeter	Marvel's Spider-Man: Miles Morales	Miles Morales / Spider-Man	
2020 (17th)	Ashley Johnson	The Last of Us Part II	Ellie	
2020 (17th)	Cherami Leigh	Cyberpunk 2077	Female V	
2020 (17th)	Daisuke Tsuji	Ghost of Tsushima	Jin Sakai	
2021 (18th)
2021 (18th)	Jane Perry	Returnal	Selene Vassos	
2021 (18th)	Ozioma Akagha	Deathloop	Julianna Blake	
2021 (18th)	Jason E. Kelley	Deathloop	Colt Vahn	
2021 (18th)	Jennifer Hale	Ratchet & Clank: Rift Apart	Rivet	
2021 (18th)	Jon McLaren	Marvel's Guardians of the Galaxy	Peter Quill / Star-Lord	
2021 (18th)	Erika Mori	Life Is Strange: True Colors	Alex Chen	
2022 (19th)	Christopher Judge	God of War Ragnarök	Kratos	
2022 (19th)	Sunny Suljic	God of War Ragnarök	Atreus	
2022 (19th)	Alain Mesa	Call of Duty: Modern Warfare II	Alejandro Vargas	
2022 (19th)	Charlotte McBurney	A Plague Tale: Requiem	Amicia	
2022 (19th)	Manon Gage	Immortality	Marissa Marcel	
2022 (19th)	Siobhan Williams	The Quarry	Laura	
2023 (20th)	Nadji Jeter	Marvel's Spider-Man 2	Miles Morales / Spider-Man	
2023 (20th)	Amelia Tyler	Baldur's Gate 3	Narrator	
2023 (20th)	Cameron Monaghan	Star Wars Jedi: Survivor	Cal Kestis	
2023 (20th)	Neil Newbon	Baldur's Gate 3	Astarion	
2023 (20th)	Samantha Béart	Baldur's Gate 3	Karlach	
2023 (20th)	Yuri Lowenthal	Marvel's Spider-Man 2	Peter Parker / Spider-Man	
2024 (21st)	Alec Newman	Still Wakes the Deep	Cameron "Caz" McLeary	
2024 (21st)	Humberly González	Star Wars Outlaws	Kay Vess	
2024 (21st)	Isabella Inchbald	Indika	Indika	
2024 (21st)	Luke Roberts	Silent Hill 2	James Sunderland	
2024 (21st)	Melina Juergens	Senua's Saga: Hellblade II	Senua	
2024 (21st)	Y'lan Noel	Call of Duty: Black Ops 6	Troy Marshall	
2025 (22nd)	Jennifer English	Clair Obscur: Expedition 33	Maelle	
2025 (22nd)	Aaron Paul	Dispatch	Robert Robertson	
2025 (22nd)	Ben Starr	Clair Obscur: Expedition 33	Verso	
2025 (22nd)	Erika Ishii	Ghost of Yōtei	Atsu	
2025 (22nd)	Tom McKay	Kingdom Come: Deliverance II	Henry of Skalitz	
2025 (22nd)	Troy Baker	Indiana Jones and the Great Circle	Indiana Jones	

== Multiple wins and nominations ==
=== Performers ===
Performer	Nominations	Wins
Laura Bailey	2	1
Nadji Jeter	2	1

=== Series ===
Series / game	Nominations	Wins
God of War Ragnarök	2	1
The Last of Us Part II	2	1
Life Is Strange	2	1
Call of Duty	2	0
Deathloop	2	0
