= Hellblade: Senua's Sacrifice =

2017 video game

- Developer: Ninja Theory (Note: Nintendo Switch and Xbox Series X/S versions co-developed by QLOC)
- Publisher: Ninja Theory (Note: Xbox Series X/S and PlayStation 5 versions published by Xbox Game Studios)
- Director: Tameem Antoniades
- Producer: Rupert Brooker
- Designers: Joe Nelson; Juan Fernandez
- Programmers: Gavin Costello; Loong Wei Ding; Melanie Hall; Stefano Prosperi
- Writer: Tameem Antoniades
- Composers: David García; Andy LaPlegua
- Series: Hellblade
- Engine: Unreal Engine 4
- Platforms: PlayStation 4; Windows; Xbox One; Nintendo Switch; Xbox Series X/S; PlayStation 5
- Release: PlayStation 4, Windows; 8 August 2017; Xbox One; 11 April 2018; Nintendo Switch; 11 April 2019; Xbox Series X/S; 9 August 2021; PlayStation 5; 12 August 2025
- Genres: Action-adventure, hack and slash
- Mode: Single-player

Hellblade: Senua's Sacrifice is a 2017 action-adventure game developed and published by Ninja Theory. It is the first installment in the Hellblade series. It was released for PlayStation 4 and Windows in August 2017, Xbox One in April 2018, Nintendo Switch in April 2019, Xbox Series X/S in August 2021, and PlayStation 5 in August 2025. Hellblade features support for virtual reality, which was added in a 2018 update.

Set in a dark fantasy world inspired by Norse mythology and Celtic culture, the game follows Senua, a Pict warrior who must make her way to Helheim by defeating otherworldly entities and facing their challenges, in order to rescue the soul of her dead lover from the goddess Hela.

Self-described as an "independent AAA game", Hellblade: Senua's Sacrifice was created by a team of approximately twenty developers led by writer and director Tameem Antoniades. The game blends different gameplay mechanics and concepts like puzzle solving, psychological horror and melee combat. Voice acting is an integral part of the game, while its cutscenes combine motion capture by Melina Juergens, and live action performances by other actors. The game's narrative serves as a metaphor for the character's struggle with psychosis, as Senua, who suffers from the condition but believes it to be a curse, is haunted by an entity known as the "Darkness", voices in her head known as "Furies", and memories from her past. To properly represent psychosis, developers worked closely with neuroscientists, mental health specialists, and people living with the condition.

Hellblade: Senua's Sacrifice received positive reviews from critics, who praised it as a work of art and applauded its uncommon choice of revolving around psychosis, the quality and uniqueness of its approach of the condition, and its story and main character. Its overall presentation, along with Juergens' performance, was also considered superior in quality to what independent games usually provide, although its gameplay and other elements received some criticism. The game sold over one million units by June 2018. A sequel, Senua's Saga: Hellblade II, was released on 21 May 2024.

== Gameplay ==
In the game, Senua has to fight against malformed representations of Norsemen using her sword.

Hellblade: Senua's Sacrifice is divided into two types of gameplay: the first allows Senua to walk freely and interact with her surroundings. Those parts focus on either story via voiceover, as Senua travels from one location to another, or the resolution of a puzzle or challenge of some kind to progress further. She can use a capacity known as "focus", in reference to her tendency to see things differently from other people due to her condition, to trigger puzzle-related events. If she uses her focus on totems hidden throughout the game, it triggers a memory via voice-over of her friend Druth telling her of the stories of the Norsemen; activating all forty-four of them triggers a bonus cutscene shortly before the game's climax, that extends on Druth's backstory. Several areas feature their own exclusive mechanics or trials, such as reaching a safe zone in time before Senua dies, or using the focus ability to modify the structure of her surroundings.

In addition, Hellblade features fights against malformed representations of Norsemen who block her progression, including occasional bosses. During those fights, Senua has her sword drawn out, and is turned towards one of her enemies, on which the camera is automatically focused; she can use two kinds of attacks, quick or heavy, kick an enemy to prevent it from blocking her attacks, parry, or dodge. She can also charge the opponent she is focusing on, to either get closer or directly attack or kick it. If she parries or dodges enough, she can use her focus ability in battle to move faster than her enemies or dissipate the shadows some of them are made of, which makes them impervious to regular attacks. Once she obtains Gramr, Senua can charge her heavy attacks for additional damage and parries more efficiently, both of which can allow her to use her focus ability. If Senua suffers a strong hit, or several hits in a row, she falls to the ground, and the player must press the corresponding button repeatedly as fast as possible before an enemy deals her a fatal blow; if she does not get back up in time, she dies. The closer she is to death, the more difficult it is for her to get back up; she can also die from a regular hit, if she was already very close to death.

Hellblade does not feature any heads-up display or tutorials. Instead, Druth, Furies, or the Darkness, provide audio indications on game mechanics, and how to progress through levels and puzzles. The Furies provide Senua advice in battle, notably warning her if an enemy is attacking from her back. They react when Senua takes damage, and panic heavily if she is close to death: how nervous they are when she takes a hit is representative of how much damage she can still take. The nature of most apparitions, events witnessed, or voices heard, is purposely left unclear, and can be interpreted as either an actual apparition by a spirit, a memory of Senua, or a trick created by the Darkness or one of the deceptive creatures she has to face. As such, the clues given during the game are not always reliable (except for Druth's): certain Furies try to demotivate Senua, or give false indications such as telling her she took the wrong way, or that she is walking into a trap.

== Plot ==
Set in the late 8th century, the game starts with Senua (Melina Juergens), a Pict warrior from Orkney arriving at the secret entrance to Helheim in a quest to save the soul of her dead lover, Dillion (Oliver Walker), from the goddess Hela. Senua believes she suffers from a curse that causes her to hear the voices of spirits, referred to as "Furies", in her head, the most notable of which is the Narrator (Chipo Chung), who is aware of the player's presence and often breaks the fourth wall by talking to them directly. She is followed by the Darkness (Steven Hartley), a dark entity at the core of the curse. She carries Dillion's severed head to use it as a vessel for his soul and is guided by her memories of the stories of Druth (Nicholas Boulton), a former slave of the Norsemen well-versed in their legends, now deceased, who became her friend and mentor during a year-long self-imposed exile. To enter Helheim, Senua overcomes several tests and defeats both the fire giant Surtr and the god of illusions Valravn, but as she crosses the bridge to Helheim, she is attacked by Hela, who defeats her with a single blow and shatters her sword. Barely surviving the encounter, Senua cauterizes a large gash on her head caused by Hela. She then follows visions of Druth and a man-shaped light she believes to be Dillion to a great tree, where she undergoes four trials that test her body, spirit, and mind and is rewarded with the legendary sword Gramr, a weapon powerful enough to kill Hela.

As the game progresses, Senua's backstory is unveiled in nonlinear order through her hallucinations, revealing that her mother, the healer Galena (Ellie Piercy), suffered the same curse she did but thought of it as a gift. However, Senua's devoutly religious father, Zynbel (also performed by Hartley), thought otherwise and burned Galena alive. Senua witnessed the event when she was just five years old, which caused her psychosis to worsen significantly and caused her to block out the memory. Her father, convincing her that she was tainted with evil, abused Senua emotionally and physically and isolated her from the rest of the world until she met Dillion. The two fell in love, and Senua left her father to be with him, as he saw her as different and misunderstood instead of cursed. However, after a plague killed many in Dillion's village, Senua, believing the fault to be hers, left in exile. When she returned a year later after seemingly conquering the Darkness, she found the surviving villagers killed by Norsemen raiders, who had sacrificed Dillion in a blood eagle to their gods. Remembering the stories of Druth, Senua then swore to save Dillion's soul from the gods of the Norsemen.

Ultimately, Senua fights against the influence of the Darkness, surviving the "Sea of Corpses" and defeating the beast Garm at the gates of Helheim. She realizes that the Darkness is a representation of her father's abuse and temporarily imprisons the Furies in a magic mirror. She then confronts Hela, who summons a legion of undead warriors; Senua fights them until she is finally overwhelmed and tries to bargain with Hela. In her final moments, she recalls Dillion telling her the importance of accepting loss. As the imagery of Helheim fades away, Hela stabs Senua with Gramr and drops Dillion's head into the abyss, but as the camera returns to her, Senua is standing in her place, with a dead Hela at her feet. Having accepted that it was never possible to bring her lover back and that she is not responsible for his death or anyone else's, Senua finally banishes the Darkness from her soul and accepts the Furies not as a curse, but as a part of who she is. She invites the player to follow her, saying that there is another story to tell.

== Development ==
Hellblade: Senua's Sacrifice was announced for the PlayStation 4 at Sony's Gamescom media briefing on August 12, 2014, where a trailer was shown. In a joint statement, Ninja Theory described the game as "an experience focused on delivering a deep character in a twisted world, with brutal uncompromising combat", and stated that they wanted to "make a smaller, more focused game experience that is uncompromising in its combat, art and story". The developers called it an "independent AAA game", with their goal being to make a game with all the qualities and production values of any AAA game on the market, but with creative freedom and an "indie spirit". The team eventually succeeded in releasing the game independently, but to achieve this could only release it via digital distribution.

Hugues Giboire, art director of the previous Ninja Theory game Heavenly Sword, rejoined the studio to work on the game. A Windows version of the game was announced on 9 January 2015. The game is powered by Unreal Engine 4, and was made by Ninja Theory with a team of around twenty developers. Its subtitle, Senua's Sacrifice, was announced in March 2016. Hellblade: Senua's Psychosis, a short documentary film included with the game, details the concept behind its story and inspirations, notably the team's study of mental illness. It was written and narrated by Antoniades, and edited by Juergens.

=== Writing ===
The main inspiration of Senua's character was the Iceni queen Boudica, while her name came from Senuna, a Celtic goddess long lost to historians but re-discovered in 2002, whose name was at first read incorrectly as Senua. Based on what is believed of the way Celtic warriors looked, Senua was portrayed with face paint, fur clothing, and braided hair clumped with lime. Doing research to find the right angle for the character, the team realized that despite the Roman Empire being able to conquer nearly all of Europe, they were unable to conquer a group of Celts, known as the Picts, in the northern reaches of Great Britain. Towards the end of the 8th century, the first Vikings arrived in the lands of the Picts, more specifically the islands of Orkney, and replaced them as the main population of the land. Based on the belief that the Norsemen were known for sacrificing the leaders of the tribes they had conquered to their gods, the game's director and lead writer Tameem Antoniades decided to use this as the basis for Senua's quest and trauma, and to have her find everyone in her village killed by the Norsemen and her lover sacrificed to Norse gods via the blood eagle, a ritualized method of execution whose authenticity is actually debated among historians.

According to Antoniades, the team, researching Celtic culture and the Celts' views on mental disorder, found out that they used the term "gelt" for a person who had been driven mad by a curse, grief, or the trauma of a battle, and that the gelt would take to a life in the woods in search of penance, punishment and purgatory; the team decided to make Senua a gelt, who had left her home in exile for those reasons. The character of Druth was based on both a real Irish Celt named Findan who was enslaved by the Norsemen in the 8th century, but eventually escaped and became a monk, and the Celtic tale of "a mad sinner who flees battle into exile and takes on a beastly nature, growing feathers on his body". The character was given a backstory similar to Findan's, a cloak featuring feathers, and was named after another word used by the Celts to describe the mental disorder, "druth", meaning "fool" or "one who utters the words of gods".

=== Inclusion of psychosis ===
Antoniades and his team initially conceptualized Hellblade: Senua's Sacrifice as "a compelling, adult, fantasy game". The game was always supposed to be hinted as taking place in Senua's mind, but with her mental illness originally less central to the story. However, the team came to see it as an opportunity to raise awareness on psychosis; regarding the team's interest with the condition, Antoniades stated "It is easy to see the pain and suffering caused by physical diseases or physical trauma, it is not so easy to see the mental suffering or trauma or severe mental illness. But what if we could find a way to see it? Games are capable of drawing you in for hours on end, playing the role of a character who's different from you, experiencing their perspective, and actively involving you in a world that functions with a different set of rules. [...] There are many things that happen in the world of Hellblade that make perfect sense within the context of Senua's mind. [...] To complete Senua's quest, you have to internalize and accept the logic and meaning behind these things to progress"; he notably felt that using the tendency of certain psychotics to see patterns others would not see or notice as a game mechanic to solve puzzles would provide a unique angle impossible in media other than video games.

"It's been refreshing to see a representation of psychosis in which the person isn't just a sort of passive receptacle for madness. Senua is the hero of her own story, trying to make sense of her experiences and work her way through them – that's incredibly de-stigmatizing. In representations of mental illness on screen, you usually have the illness first, and then a two-dimensional character attached to that. In this case, the character is fully-formed, and they are not defined by their condition."

— Prof. Paul Fletcher, neuroscientist and psychosis expert, who worked on the game.

Antoniades admitted that during his research, he "didn't have to look very far to discover my own ignorance of the subject". To portray psychosis properly, Ninja Theory "consulted world-leading neuroscientists and non-profit organizations like Wellcome Trust to properly capture the experience of psychosis and its devastating effects on the human mind". Antoniades "learnt that people can experience hallucinations and delusional beliefs without it being a problem – the illness comes when those experiences cause suffering. Often the recovery is not about curing yourself of hallucinations, but finding ways to live with them. That was a revelation to me".

Experts who worked closely with the team include Professor Paul Fletcher from the University of Cambridge, and writer and psychologist Professor Charles Fernyhough from the University of Durham, an expert on voice hearing. Ninja Theory received funding for the game from the Wellcome Trust, who also helped them creatively in their depiction of mental illness, notably by helping them to get in contact with people actually experiencing it. They worked with a "recovery college", an establishment which acts as both a health facility, and a college for its patients. Antoniades was marked by the story of "a girl who has to live with an angry voice screaming at her, slamming on her doors and walls 24 hours a day. That's someone who would often see corpses hanging in the room, so real that they would sometimes try to rescue them"; this inspired several events featured in the game as well.

When working with experts, the team realized that "quite often, the illness comes not from the symptoms, but from the stigma, isolation, and mistreatment that comes about from the rest of society". This led the team to make Senua's father and the way he abused and isolated her during her youth the real nature of the Darkness which haunts her. To create the voices heard by Senua, the team "worked closely with a group of voice-hearers to try and get these sounding as realistic as possible"; Senua's visual hallucinations, including her flashbacks, or the way several elements of a level appear brighter than they should be, were also based on descriptions from people with delusions. In June 2017, the team presented the near-finished game to several of the people with mental illness they had collaborated with, as a way to see if the final result had "reflected their views or if it had misrepresented them".

=== Casting, filming and recording ===
Senua's voice acting and motion capturing were performed by German freelance photographer and video editor Melina Juergens, who had not done either of those things prior to Hellblade. She was used by the team as a stand-in for Senua for several months while they perfected their motion capture techniques, and they eventually came to the conclusion that she could play the character in the finalized game to save the cost of hiring a professional actress. Game director and lead writer Tameem Antoniades stated that he knew her well enough to know that he did not have to teach her how to act, but to "relive her own internal pain". All cutscenes feature Juergens' vocal performance as she recorded it during the filming of her physical performance with a motion capture suit and markers, rather than before or afterward during a voice acting session. In addition to the camera placed in front of Juergens' face to capture her expressions for her animated counterpart, Antoniades used a portable camera to film the scenes as they appear in the final game. As they only had one camera, the team opted to make all the cutscenes be presented as one single long take, the objective being to make the viewer feel like "an observer, like a presence watching Senua throughout".

Operating on a much smaller budget with Hellblade: Senua's Sacrifice than their previous games, Ninja Theory went out of their usual ways to film the cutscenes of the game. Instead of going to bigger studios and having a team of approximately 20 people film several actors together, as they did in the past, they filmed only Juergens in a small space, with only three other people needed on set: Antoniades directing and filming, one person to look after the audio, and one person to look after the motion capture process. To save more money, the team used equipment described by Antoniades as "fairly cheap", including material bought at a low price at IKEA and on Amazon. As a further cost-saving measure, they used their own boardroom for the motion capture scenes, rather than using external motion capture studio spaces.

The helmet capturing Juergens' expressions and voice was provided to the team by Technoprops. The team opted to feature only two cameras on the helmet, as they felt that having four would be too uncomfortable for Juergens and impact her performance. The audio recording device was the most expensive part of the setup, and was placed around Juergens' forehead to avoid recording breathing sounds. Because all of Juergens' audio was recorded live, the team could not give her indications or reminders directly, or play music she would synchronize her performance with. For this reason, pre-recorded audio notes by Antoniades and excerpts from the soundtrack would be played at the same time on headphones both he and Juergens would wear, so they could act accordingly and in synchronization with each other.

To feature the voices in Senua's head in a way that would be realistic regarding actual people suffering auditory hallucinations, the team, based on descriptions by Professor Charles Fernyhough, an expert on the subject, recorded several actors using binaural recording that also records the 3D position of sound, so the voices would sound as close or distant as the actors were to the microphone, replicating the way human ears perceive sounds. The team then invited voice hearers to listen to the result in order to give them feedback for future recordings. Abbi Greenland and Helen Goalen, both founding members of British theatre company RashDash, were ultimately cast as the voices, known as the Furies, a role they would reprise in the game's sequel. The original score for the game was composed by David García and Andy LaPlegua; the song "Just Like Sleep" by Passarella Death Squad is played during the final battle, and the song "Illusion" by VNV Nation plays during the ending credits.

== Release ==
Hellblade: Senua's Sacrifice was released digitally for PlayStation 4 and Windows on 8 August 2017. Following the period of timed console exclusivity for the PlayStation 4, a digital version for the Xbox One, (with enhanced graphical support for the Xbox One X) was released on 11 April 2018. On 31 July 2018, an update added full virtual reality support via the HTC Vive and Oculus Rift headsets. On 4 December 2018, a physical edition was released for PS4 and Xbox One. On 13 February 2019, the game was announced for Nintendo Switch and released digitally on 11 April.

While the game was playable through backwards compatibility on the Xbox Series X/S, an enhanced version with improved visuals and ray tracing support was released through a free optimization patch on 9 August 2021. A PlayStation 5 version of the game including the prior graphical and performance improvements seen on Windows and Xbox Series X/S, launched simultaneously with the PS5 port of the game's sequel Senua's Saga: Hellblade II on August 12, 2025. In addition to being included alongside the latter in the game's Deluxe Edition, the enhancements are included in a free update to existing owners of the original PlayStation 4 release of Senua's Sacrifice.

== Reception ==
Reception

Aggregate scores
Aggregator	Score
Metacritic	PC: 83/100; PS4: 81/100; XONE: 88/100; NS: 80/100
OpenCritic	81 %

Review scores
Publication	Score
Destructoid	7.5/10
Electronic Gaming Monthly	8.5/10
Game Informer	8/10
GameSpot	8/10
Giant Bomb	4/5
IGN	9/10
PC Gamer (US)	78/100
VideoGamer.com	9/10

Hellblade: Senua's Sacrifice received "generally favorable" reviews from critics, according to review aggregator website Metacritic. Its choice to depict and revolve around psychosis was applauded as a unique and interesting choice, as was the execution of those themes, and the idea of blending its approach with Norse mythology and the grief-ridden journey of Senua. Juergens' performance, and the game's sound, artistic direction, tense atmosphere, and low price, were also praised; the quality of its production value and graphics was singled out as superior to what independent games usually offer. Reception of the combat and puzzles were more mixed, with several reviewers complaining about combat being too repetitive and simplistic, the lack of variety in the enemies, and about the puzzles being redundant.

Brandin Tyrrel of IGN praised the story, sound, directing, art direction, voice acting, music, and innovative presentation, and stating "it unfolds like a beautiful, dark, tense visual novel, placing the excellently raw, human performance of its main character front and center on her journey into the land of the Northmen. Her story is one of confusion, sadness, fear, and loss, and it's punctuated by moments of beauty, and strength that has left a lasting impression on me." He added "As impressive as [Hellblade's] story is, Ninja Theory's smart design reinforces the sensory nature of the harrowing tale through subtle and intuitive mechanics [...] Its incredibly smart use of audio and visual distortion and trickery to convey the frightening effects of psychosis, hallucinations, and delusion, are married with the gameplay elements for an experience that rarely ever grapples over whether it's a game or a story". Brad Shoemaker of Giant Bomb stated as a narrative effort, its success was "almost unparalleled in the medium". He applauded the story, sound, characters, graphics, Juergens' performance and "piercing intensity". He appreciated the less artistic elements, but felt that the gameplay for battles was "usually satisfying but can also feel like a chore in confined spaces". However, he described the boss fights as "all unique and exceptionally memorable". Alice Bell of VideoGamer.com gave the game a 9 out of 10, praising its "incredibly compelling story", "fast, stylish combat", and "beautiful and horrible audio and visual design".

"Hellblade's gameplay mechanics are few and relatively straightforward--though at half the price of most games with this quality of production, that's easier to forgive--but as a narrative effort its success is almost unparalleled in the medium."

— Giant Bomb

In a positive review, Leif Johnson of PC Gamer praised Hellblade: Senua's Sacrifice for its themes, presentation and story, but complained that the "inspiration doesn't carry over to the actual fights. [...] I frankly found it kind of dull in the one-on-one duels at the start, and it didn't help that the enemies sometimes seem to skip a few animations when reacting to attacks. Nor does it help that there's precious little variation in the foes themselves, who almost always show up as tall, shirtless warriors with deer-skull helmets or as beefy berserker shamans. By the end of the first hour, you've basically seen every non-boss you're going to see". He did, however, consider combat to get much better once Senua has to face many enemies at once. In one of the publications to give the game a somewhat negative review, Edge was unhappy with the game's depiction of Senua's condition.

Several reviewers were less enthusiastic, with most criticism directed at the gameplay, fights and puzzles; however, most of them still praised Hellblade as a work of art. Among them was Game Informer's Joe Juba, who found Hellblade to be "undeniably memorable, telling a compelling tale that explores subject matter many consider taboo". However, he believed that the gameplay suffered from the game's themes. Unaware of the fake nature of the game's supposed permadeath, he complained that it was too unclear how close to a permanent game over he was, and felt the sense that he was in "frustrating". He also found the puzzles tedious, and believed that the idea of the fight sequences allowing certain enemies to be off-screen translated poorly to gameplay.

Eurogamer ranked the game ninth on their list of the "Top 50 Games of 2017", GamesRadar+ ranked it 16th on their list of the 25 Best Games of 2017, and EGMNow ranked it 19th in their list of the 25 Best Games of 2017, while Polygon ranked it 24th on their list of the 50 best games of 2017. The game received nominations for "Best PC Game", "Best PlayStation 4 Game", "Best Action-Adventure Game", "Best Graphics", "Best Story", and "Most Innovative" (the latter for which it became a runner-up) at IGN's Best of 2017 Awards.

Game Informer has listed Hellblade: Senua's Sacrifice among best games released throughout the eighth video game generation.

=== Depiction of psychosis ===
The game's depiction of psychosis was applauded, and often described as the game's greatest quality. Several media outlets and reviewers analyzed the game's depiction of psychosis in more detail: it was noted that all parts of the game, including the fights and puzzles, were made to further the depiction of Senua's psychosis and revolved around her condition. Paul Fletcher, a neuroscientist and psychosis expert at the University of Cambridge who worked on the game, said that "It's been exciting to see Senua received so positively by those who have lived with experiences of psychosis."

Michael Briers of PlayStationLifeStyle, stated that "by working closely with neuroscientists and those unfortunate few who have been diagnosed as psychotic, Hellblade carefully avoids those cheap, half-assed tropes that render a character insane and, therefore, woefully one-dimensional. Not only does it act as a disservice to those who suffer from mental illness, this practice of painting in broad strokes only minimizes the room for nuance, but Senua's Sacrifice boldly cuts through the white noise". Leif Johnson of PC Gamer praised the gripping depiction of a character suffering from psychosis, stating "Ninja Theory uses haunted eyes to full effect in long, moody closeups peppering the narrative. [Senua] peers not only into the darkness but seemingly past the camera, past the screen. Looking back, I found depths of despair and anger there that were sometimes hard to meet head-on [...] Some people would crumble under such pain. But still, Senua fights. It's a little inspiring."

Alice Bell of VideoGamer.com noted that although Senua's psychosis is a cause of tragedy in her life, the game also depicted her condition as something that can bring her contentment, stating that her hallucinations are sometimes "actually lovely too, reflecting that psychosis can manifest as color and beauty." Regarding the story as a whole, she stated "you [the player] learn about the trauma Senua has faced, made greater by her struggles with her own mental health and others' lack of understanding of it. Great care has been taken, with input every step of the way from psychologists and people who have experienced psychosis, to give as faithful a representation of it as possible. The hardest battles are fought in the mind, says Dillion, although Senua has physical battles as well."

Mollie L Patterson of Electronic Gaming Monthly declared that "while I can't speak to that side of things from personal experience, I can tell you that I was legitimately affected by [Senua's] condition at times. Playing a good portion of the game with headphones on, quiet moments were often broken by the never-ending chatter of those other selves conflicting in their thoughts, with some wanting to help their host in her quest, and others constantly telling Senua (and you) that she was wrong in her choices, that she was destined to failure, or that it was all hopeless. It's hard to explain how powerful those words can be, even as a player detached from Senua's condition, and it was one of many elements that helped form a bond between us."

"It's very hard to represent what this experience is like, partly because it's such a personal, intense, emotional experience. [...] What they've come up with is so compelling, it's by far the best representation I've heard of what these experiences are like."

— Prof. Charles Fernyhough, an expert on voice hearing, on the game's portrayal of the voices in Senua's head.

Shoemaker stated "Hellblade's single most powerful trick is a near-constant stream of voices in Senua's head, recorded with a spatial audio technique so they feel like they're all around you, nagging at you, undermining your decisions and your confidence. These voices are frequently in conflict with what you're doing and even with each other; one side can be encouraging you while the other mock you mercilessly. The effect is striking. Over time Senua's pain becomes palpable, incontestable, especially as the stress worsens the longer these voices harangue you, the more vicious and deranged they become. It's important to remember that you as the player, though, have the luxury of turning them off whenever you want. Hellblade's robust bag of psychological tricks and the sheer fact of Senua's distressing reality result in the game's uncommon ability to capture the feelings of worthlessness, lack of control, of being misunderstood and shunned, the strange mix of hope and despair that can accompany a debilitating mental illness."

Not all media outlets were satisfied with the game's depiction of the condition. In an article he published to criticize the game, Mic gaming editor Jason Faulkner, who had experience working with the mentally ill, praised Senua's character, but was highly critical of the game, stating that it should have focused on helping people to truly understand psychosis, and have the condition be "focal and explicit", instead of representing it metaphorically: "If you go into the game without any background information, you might assume that Senua is living with delusions and Norse mythology-inspired hallucinations — or you might think that she's being haunted by demons and ghosts. [...] The portrayal of Senua's mental illness would be better served by showing both sides of her story: what's in her head and what's actually happening." He also stated that the game "stifles the opportunity to inject commentary about the broader picture of mental health care", notably by not depicting caregivers or other people dedicated to helping those with mental illness in real life. Edge deplored that Senua's psychosis was depicted as "something of an asset: a helpful superpower that can give you the strength to soldier on through the darkness, so long as you can put up with the odd breakdown here and there."

=== Death mechanic ===
Early in the game, Senua's hand becomes "tainted" and starts to rot. The Darkness tells her that every time she "dies" (every death turns out to be a vision of a possible future), the rot will spread further up, until it reaches her head and consumes her soul; the game implies that, if this happens, it will result in a permadeath, as the player's save would be deleted, and all game progress until then would be erased. However, several media outlets later found out that the rot stops spreading after a certain number of deaths, and cannot progress further before a certain point in the game, ultimately making it impossible for it to reach Senua's head.

Antoniades said that the permadeath mechanic was a bluff: while the rot will spread on Senua's body over repeated deaths, it will never fully reach her head; the wording they chose to describe this was meant to convey part of the fear associated with mental illness and psychosis directly to the player. Antoniades said "We were looking for ideas of how you introduce fear, and one of those ideas was the permadeath mechanic. It's the only time we're very explicit about what will happen to you in the game." He considered that they believed that players and critics have mistaken their wording on the permadeath mechanic when the game was released, which created a "blowout", but he defended their use of the wording as "it's your interpretation as a player that taints the meaning behind it. That's something we wanted to do on purpose, because with mental illness it's your frame of mind that interprets the world, and that can cause you distress."

Reid McCarter of PC Gamer strongly defended Ninja Theory's move, calling it "great game design and a modern expression of unreliable narration". He stated "As the story progresses, the nature of the corruption becomes clearer as the player comes to understand a correlation between Senua's backstory and psychology and the way they perceive the game's dangers. It is a beautifully executed bit of narrative design, game systems and story working in tandem." PCGamesN called it a "clever decision", as it "focuses on Senua's own fear of her enemies and degrading mental state". Eurogamer called it "a cool trick that makes the player feel a sense of dread as they're playing the game. Dread, anxiety and death are all themes Hellblade revolves around. It certainly fits".

=== Sales ===
Hellblade: Senua's Sacrifice was the best-selling game on the PlayStation Store in Europe for the month of its release. According to director Tameem Antoniades the game sold "better than expected" and broke even in approximately three months, ahead of the six to nine months the developers expected. PC Gamer stated about Hellblade's success that "the news can only be positive. Perhaps if other developers see an experimental game like Hellblade finding commercial success then they'll be more likely to take risks on their own titles—and that, ultimately, will lead to more interesting games". To celebrate World Mental Health Day on 10 October 2017, Ninja Theory donated all profit made from the sales of Hellblade on that day to Rethink Mental Illness. By June 2018, the game had sold over a million units.

=== Awards ===
Year	Award	Category	Result	Ref.
2017	The Independent Game Developers' Association Awards 2017	Best Audio Design	Nominated	
2017	The Independent Game Developers' Association Awards 2017	Best Visual Design	Nominated	
2017	The Independent Game Developers' Association Awards 2017	Best Action and Adventure Game	Won	
2017	Golden Joystick Awards 2017	Best Audio	Nominated	
2017	Golden Joystick Awards 2017	Best Gaming Performance (for Melina Juergens)	Nominated	
2017	Golden Joystick Awards 2017	Breakthrough Award (for Melina Juergens)	Nominated	
2017	The Game Awards 2017	Best Narrative	Nominated	
2017	The Game Awards 2017	Best Audio Design	Won	
2017	The Game Awards 2017	Best Performance (for Melina Juergens)	Won	
2017	The Game Awards 2017	Games for Impact	Won	
2017	The Game Awards 2017	Best Independent Game	Nominated	
2018	Writers' Guild of Great Britain Awards	Best Writing in a Video Game	Won	
2018	45th Annie Awards	Outstanding Achievement for Character Animation in a Video Game	Nominated	
2018	21st Annual D.I.C.E. Awards	Outstanding Achievement in Animation	Nominated	
2018	21st Annual D.I.C.E. Awards	Outstanding Achievement in Art Direction	Nominated	
2018	21st Annual D.I.C.E. Awards	Outstanding Achievement in Character (Senua)	Won	
2018	21st Annual D.I.C.E. Awards	Outstanding Achievement in Story	Nominated	
2018	21st Annual D.I.C.E. Awards	Outstanding Technical Achievement	Nominated	
2018	SXSW Gaming Awards	Excellence in SFX	Nominated	
2018	SXSW Gaming Awards	Excellence in Technical Achievement	Nominated	
2018	SXSW Gaming Awards	Excellence in Visual Achievement	Nominated	
2018	SXSW Gaming Awards	Most Promising New Intellectual Property	Nominated	
2018	SXSW Gaming Awards	Excellence in Narrative	Nominated	
2018	SXSW Gaming Awards	Matthew Crump Cultural Innovation Award	Nominated	
2018	Game Developers Choice Awards	Best Audio	Nominated	
2018	Game Developers Choice Awards	Best Narrative	Nominated	
2018	Game Developers Choice Awards	Best Technology	Nominated	
2018	14th British Academy Games Awards	Best Game	Nominated	
2018	14th British Academy Games Awards	British Game	Won	
2018	14th British Academy Games Awards	Artistic Achievement	Won	
2018	14th British Academy Games Awards	Audio Achievement	Won	
2018	14th British Academy Games Awards	Game Beyond Entertainment	Won	
2018	14th British Academy Games Awards	Game Innovation	Nominated	
2018	14th British Academy Games Awards	Music	Nominated	
2018	14th British Academy Games Awards	Narrative	Nominated	
2018	14th British Academy Games Awards	Performer (for Melina Juergens)	Won	
2018	Ivor Novello Awards	Best Original Video Game Score	Nominated	
2018	Develop Awards	Animation	Nominated	
2018	Develop Awards	Visual Design	Nominated	
2018	Develop Awards	Music Design	Won	
2018	Develop Awards	Sound Design (Ninja Theory)	Nominated	
2018	Develop Awards	Writing or Narrative Design	Won	
2018	The Independent Game Developers' Association Awards 2018	Creativity Award	Won	
2018	The Independent Game Developers' Association Awards 2018	Best Audio Design	Nominated	
2018	The Independent Game Developers' Association Awards 2018	Diversity Award	Nominated	
2018	Golden Joystick Awards 2018	Xbox Game of the Year	Nominated	
2019	2019 Webby Awards	Action Game	Nominated	
2019	2019 Webby Awards	Best Art Direction	Won	
2019	2019 Webby Awards	Best Music/Sound Design	Nominated	
2019	2019 Webby Awards	Best Visual Design	Nominated	
2019	2019 Webby Awards	Best Writing (People's Voice)	Won	
2019	2019 Webby Awards	Technical Achievement	Nominated	
2019	The Independent Game Developers' Association Awards 2019	Creativity Award	Nominated	

In addition to the awards received by the game, the team of Hellblade, including Antoniades and Juergens, won the award for Best Real-Time Graphics & Interactivity at SIGGRAPH in 2016, for a showcase demonstration of a technique they called "Realtime Cinematography", during which they performed and filmed live a scene from Hellblade, which was "shot, captured and edited to final quality in minutes, a process that would normally take weeks or months". also The VR Edition of the critically acclaimed BAFTA award-winning Hellblade: Senua's Sacrifice. From the makers of Heavenly Sword, Enslaved: Odyssey to the West, and DmC: Devil May Cry, comes a warrior’s brutal journey into myth and madness

== Sequel ==
Senua's Saga: Hellblade II was announced during The Game Awards 2019. The game's soundtrack was composed by Heilung and is set in Iceland and uses Unreal Engine 5. The game was released for Windows and Xbox Series X/S on 21 May 2024.
