= Senua's Saga: Hellblade II =

2024 video game

- Developer: Ninja Theory
- Publisher: Xbox Game Studios
- Directors: Dan Attwell; David Garcia-Diaz; Mark Slater-Tunstill
- Producer: Rupert Brooker
- Designer: Rahni Tucker
- Programmers: Gavin Costello; Loong Wei Ding; Andrew Vidler
- Writers: Lara Derham; Tameem Antoniades
- Composers: Matteo Tummino; Jamie Molloy
- Series: Hellblade
- Engine: Unreal Engine 5
- Platforms: Windows; Xbox Series X/S; PlayStation 5
- Release: Windows, Xbox Series X/S; May 21, 2024; PlayStation 5; August 12, 2025
- Genres: Action-adventure, hack and slash
- Mode: Single-player

Senua's Saga: Hellblade II is a 2024 action-adventure game developed by Ninja Theory and published by Xbox Game Studios. It is the second installment in the Hellblade series. The game serves as the sequel to Hellblade: Senua's Sacrifice (2017) and is set in 9th century Iceland, drawing inspiration from Norse mythology and culture.

Senua's Saga: Hellblade II was created with a higher budget and a larger team when compared with its predecessor. The gameplay is similar; it features combo-based combat, as well as puzzles. The gameplay and visuals have been revamped: faster-paced combat, and improved visuals built on Unreal Engine 5, while retaining the psychological horror and focus on Senua's struggle with psychosis.

Senua's Saga: Hellblade II was released for Windows and Xbox Series X/S on May 21, 2024. A PlayStation 5 version launched on August 12, 2025 alongside an "Enhanced" update across all platforms, including features such as a higher-framerate Performance Mode, new game modes and additions to Photo Mode. The game received generally positive reviews from critics, who praised its art direction, visuals and sound design, though some noted pacing issues and a combat system favoring spectacle over depth.

== Gameplay ==
The player is engaging in combat with an enemy.

Senua's Saga: Hellblade II is a third-person action-adventure game. It carries over the concepts and gameplay elements of its predecessor, utilizing puzzles and runes to advance, and an examination of Senua's mental state. A new fighting system is also incorporated. The game features dynamic weather systems and realistic physics, affecting both combat and exploration. Players navigate treacherous terrain, from slippery ice-covered slopes to storm-lashed coastlines.

The game features a revamped combat system emphasizing fluidity and strategy. Senua's expanded arsenal of moves allows for various combat styles and tactics, including a time-slowing mechanic for executing quick strikes. Enemy encounters boast a greater variety, each with unique attack patterns and weaknesses. The focus is on faster, more intense battles, requiring players to adapt quickly to different enemy types and utilize Senua's combat skills effectively to survive.

Exploration is a significant aspect of gameplay, with players navigating landscapes and uncovering hidden collectibles that enrich the game's lore, such as hidden faces and Lorestangir posts. Puzzles in Senua's Saga are integrated into the environment, often requiring unique interactions with the game world, such as deciphering runes or manipulating elements to progress.

The game features psychological horror elements. Players grapple with Senua's psychosis, and the voices that accompany Senua on her journey serve both as a guide and a challenge.

== Plot ==
In the 9th century, the Orcadian warrior Senua is willingly captured by Northmen slavers and taken across the sea from Orkney to Iceland, hoping to free her enslaved people. A storm destroys the slave ships and Senua washes up on shore. As she navigates along the coast, Senua experiences vivid hallucinations and is haunted by voices only she can hear that encourage or intimidate her, including the Shadow, the memory of her abusive father. Senua defeats the slave master, Thórgestr, taking him prisoner so he can lead her to his settlement of Borgarviki.

Along the way, they encounter a razed settlement, which Thórgestr fearfully blames on the draugar, a legion of feral and cannibalistic barbarians. Senua follows the devastation to a Draugar camp and frees the captive Fargrímr, sensing his importance to her journey. The draugar are alerted and summon the giant Illtauga, who causes a rockslide which buries the camp. Senua and Fargrímr escape and return to the restrained Thórgestr, whom she decides to free because she senses good in him. The trio travel to Fargrímr's settlement which is on the brink of ruin due to Illtauga's attacks.

Fargrímr explains that the Askja volcano eruption broke the walls between Midgard and Jötunheimr, allowing the giants into their world, and Borgarviki sacrifices slaves to appease the giants. Believing Senua is a seer because she hears voices, Fargrímr sends her to find the Hiddenfolk, god-like beings who live underground, who may know the giants' weakness. After passing tests to prove her worth, the Hiddenfolk tell Senua that Askja blackened the sky and blighted the land, causing famine, conflict, and the emergence of new, crueller gods. A desperate woman, Ingunn, left her infant in the Hiddenfolk's caves, hoping they would protect it and, in her anger, sought power from Asjka to survive, turning her into Illtauga. Senua confronts Illtauga with her true name and returns the bones of her infant, turning Illtauga to stone. Seeing her victory, Thórgestr resolves to join Senua's journey.

Senua, Fargrímr, and Thórgestr travel to Baroarvik for resources, where their leader Ástríðr asks them to kill Sjávarrisi, the giant devastating their shores. The Hiddenfolk tell Senua that Sjávarrisi was a good man but, overcome by fear following Askja's eruption, he secured his safety by betraying Ástríðr's father into a fatal ambush. The settlers exiled Sjávarrisi and he was swallowed by the sea, becoming a giant. Draugar attack Baroarvik and although they are defeated, Senua blames herself for their arrival and the ensuing deaths. Senua and her allies lure Sjávarrisi from his cave, where Senua absolves him, turning him to stone.

While traveling through the haunted Járnviðr forest on route to Borgarviki, Fargrímr, Thórgestr, and Ástríðr are stricken with fear and doubt, but Senua supports and leads them to safety. At Borgarviki, Ástríðr and Fargrímr free the restrained slave sacrifices left outside while Senua and Thórgestr confront his father and Borgarviki's leader, the goði. He refuses to listen to Thórgestr, and Senua deduces that the goði needs the giants because their threat allows him to maintain control over his people. Learning the slaves were freed, and with the giant Tyrant approaching, the goði captures Senua and attempts to sacrifice her, but Thórgestr confronts him. Senua is drawn away by the Hiddenfolk who reveal that Tyrant was a noble leader dedicated to protecting his followers following Askja's eruption. However, he was corrupted by the power they instilled in him and, when things improved, he gave them something new to fear by creating the giants and blaming them for natural disasters.

Returned to reality, Senua witnesses the goði mortally wound Thórgestr. Before dying, Thórgestr warns Senua that if she kills the goði someone else will take his place. Senua defeats the goði, revealing his lies about the giants to his followers and turning them against him. She is tempted to kill the goði and take his place, becoming like her father and controlling her people to keep them safe at any cost, in turn receiving power, love, and fear. She relents, however, embracing the supportive memories of those she has saved and the realization that she is not bound by destiny.

== Development ==
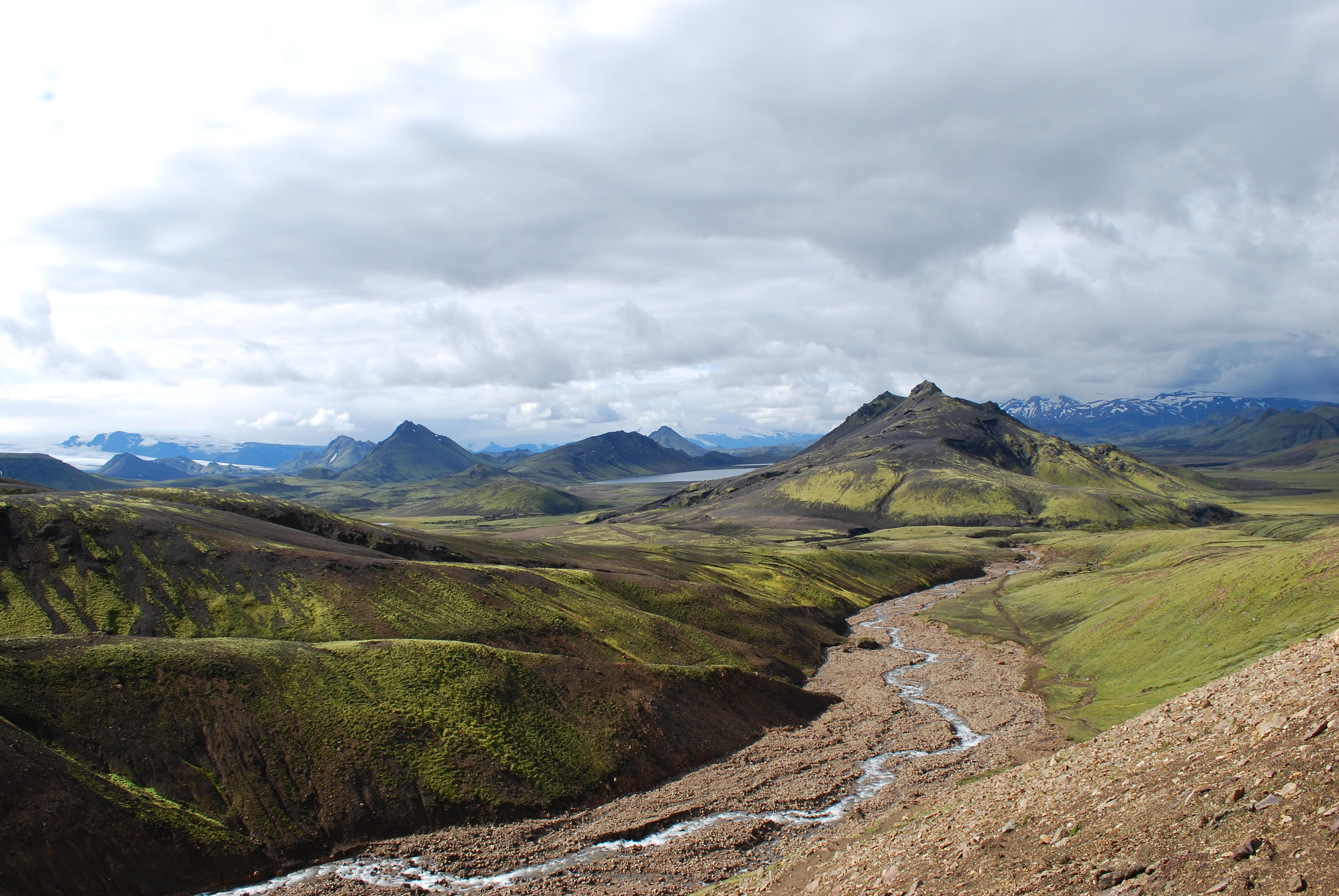
The creative director of Ninja Theory, Tameem Antoniades, drew inspiration from the natural landscapes of Iceland while shaping both the setting and narrative of Senua's Saga: Hellblade II.

Senua's Saga: Hellblade II was developed by Ninja Theory, the creators of Hellblade: Senua's Sacrifice (2017). Ninja Theory was acquired by Microsoft in 2018 and became a subsidiary of Xbox Game Studios. While about twenty people contributed to Senua's Sacrifice, the studio has since expanded to employ around one hundred workers, with approximately eighty of them working on Senua's Saga.

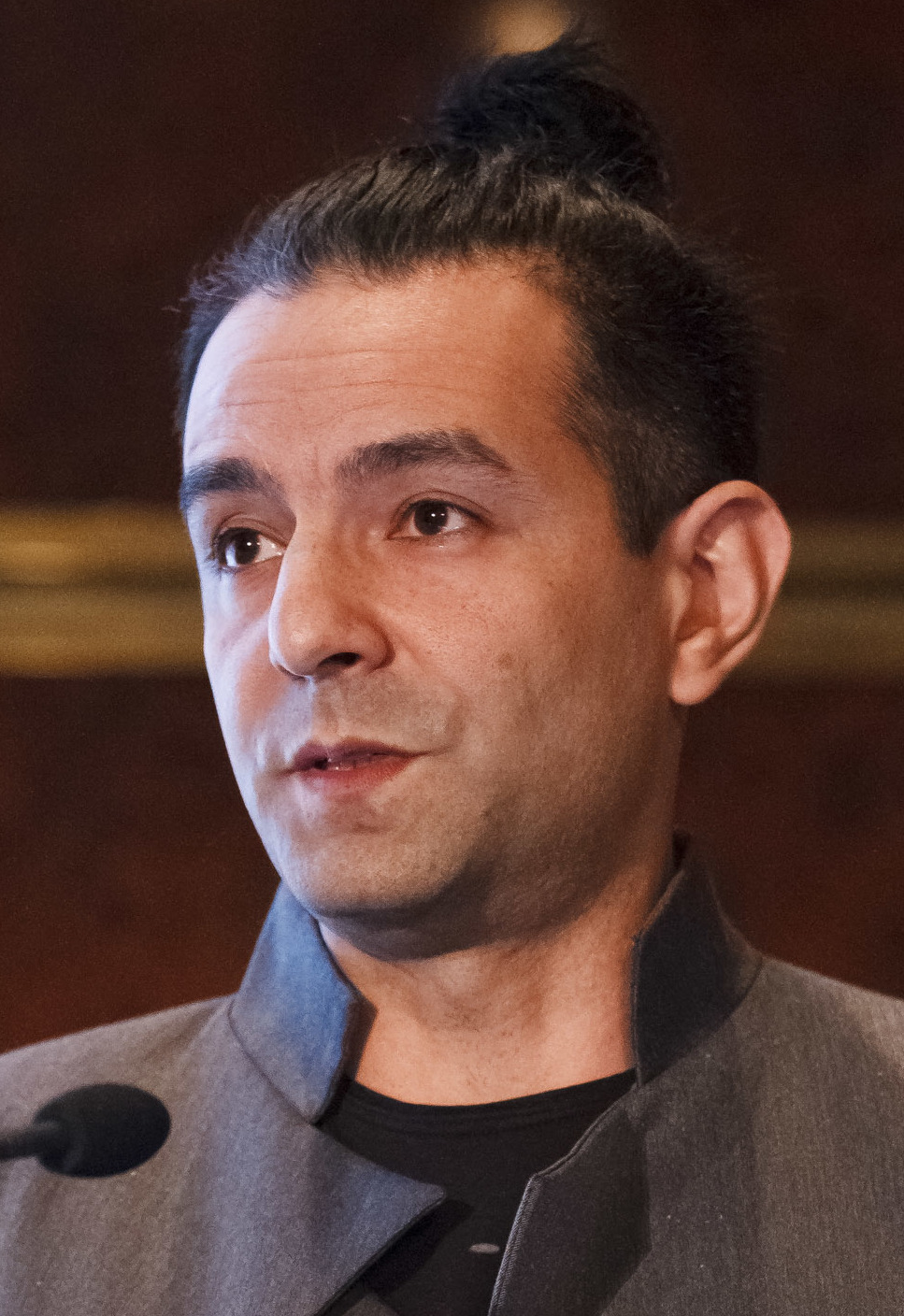
Tameem Antoniades (pictured in 2014) served as the creative director of Hellblade II.

After the release of the first part, Tameem Antoniades, co-founder and creative director of the studio, decided to take a break and went on a trip, during which he visited Iceland. He was so impressed by the beauty of the place that it inspired him to have Iceland as the game's main setting. Attwell described the country as a "geological theme park", and Ninja Theory chairman Dom Matthews later called the game "a love letter to Iceland." Antoniades stated that the studio wanted to write a story that could be compared to ancient myths and sagas. Antoniades participated in the early stages of development before leaving the company. Following his departure, David Garcia, the director of sound, Mark Slater-Tunstill, and Dan Attwell, the director of environment art, took on the roles of primary project leaders.

The creators wanted to shift the emphasis from portraying Senua's internal battle with insanity to examining how she interacts with the outside world, shaped by her unique worldview. To accurately depict psychosis in Senua, they once again consulted with Paul Fletcher, a professor at Cambridge University, and individuals experiencing the disorder.

Melina Jürgens, who reprised her role as Senua, expressed her disapproval of the belief that her character had "overcome all her adversity and healed" after the events of Senua's Sacrifice, emphasizing that individuals with psychosis typically never fully recover from their condition. Her intention was to depict Senua's transformation from a "victim of psychosis" to someone who can not only manage her condition but also utilize it as a tool to accomplish her objectives. Ninja Theory has described Senua as a "beacon of hope" in the sequel. Jürgens used a process akin to method acting for her performance; this included traveling to Iceland, extensive training in swordplay and martial arts for more realistic combat, and spending eight hours having her character's makeup, hair, and costume put on before recording. Additionally, the animators underwent military training to ensure that enemy NPCs moved and behaved authentically. Abby Greenland and Helen Goalen reprised their roles as the "Furies" — the voices that Senua hears.

Senua's Saga features an improved fighting system, emphasizing its "seamless" integration with the story. The primary inspiration for the battle system was the fight choreography featured in the "Battle of the Bastards" episode from Game of Thrones. To effectively portray Senua's struggle for survival, the developers focused on in-person combat, aiming to make it feel urgent, unpredictable, and immersive. They used motion capture technology to record a variety of battle animations over a 75-day period, covering different skirmish scenarios.

Ninja Theory created an elaborate segment of the game before proceeding to full-scale development. Unlike the first game, which used Unreal Engine 4, the sequel was developed using the newer Unreal Engine 5. This upgrade allowed for improved character models, animations, and other visual components, as well as better utilization of the Xbox Series X/S console. On the Series X/S, the developers capped the frame rate at 30 frames per second to achieve a more cinematic experience. The studio employed Epic Games' MetaHuman framework for facial animations. Motion capture was conducted in Ninja Theory's new office, which was specially equipped for this purpose. The developers collaborated again with 3Lateral, a subsidiary of Epic Games that specializes in motion capture digitization. 3Lateral contributor Uroš Sikimić stated that the team aimed to make the end result "as photorealistic as possible, while also experimenting with new cinematic techniques". Additionally, Ninja Theory partnered with Ziva Dynamics, a company specializing in visual effects, and Altered AI, which creates voiceovers using artificial intelligence. Altered AI's technology was used to generate content during the early stages of development.

The developers then used satellite data in conjunction with the generated graphic resources to reconstruct the Icelandic landscape from the ninth century. Numerous other components, such as hair and cosmetics, as well as clothes made by costume designers utilizing materials and methods unique to the era shown in Senua's Saga, were scanned to generate 3D reproductions using a similar process. Attwell claims that Robert Eggers' directing techniques, namely his dedication to historical authenticity in the portrayal of diverse issues, served as an inspiration for the company. Similar to the prior experience, the creators replicated audio hallucinations using the binaural recording approach. The studio enlisted Heilung on the soundtrack, believing that "their skill, depth and substantiveness in the music blends perfectly with our playing and gives it a special weight.

== Marketing and release ==
Senua's Saga: Hellblade II was announced on 13 December 2019, during The Game Awards 2019, where the debut trailer was showcased. It marked the first Xbox Series X/S console exclusive to be announced, coinciding with the unveiling of the console earlier that day.

Senua's Saga was released for Windows and Xbox Series X/S on 21 May 2024. The game is playable on the Xbox Cloud Gaming service and launched on the Xbox Game Pass subscription service. It does not have a physical edition, and is similar in length to its predecessor.

On the one-year anniversary of the game's launch in May 2025, Ninja Theory announced that Senua's Saga would release for PlayStation 5 in summer with new features added and optimizations for both the base console and the PlayStation 5 Pro. Enhancements available on both consoles include a Performance Mode that updates the game at a framerate of 60 frames-per-second (FPS), an additional roguelike game mode focused around resisting the Dark Rot during the main campaign, improvements to Photo Mode including support for in-game video capture, and a developer commentary. The PlayStation 5 version released on August 12, 2025, alongside a free update for the Windows and Xbox Series X/S versions with the aforementioned features. In addition to the standard edition of the game, Microsoft distributes a deluxe edition which bundles Senua's Saga with a native port of the original Hellblade: Senua's Sacrifice (2017) for PlayStation 5, containing the graphical and performance enhancements previously added to the Windows and Xbox Series X/S versions in 2021.

An Entertainment Software Rating Board (ESRB) listing in May 2025 revealed plans for Limited Run Games to distribute a physical release of Senua's Saga for PlayStation 5 and Xbox Series X, alongside a similar release of the original Hellblade: Senua's Sacrifice for Nintendo Switch.

== Reception ==
Reception

Aggregate score
Aggregator	Score
Metacritic	(PC) 81/100 (XSXS) 81/100

Review scores
Publication	Score
Digital Trends	4/5
Eurogamer	5/5
Game Informer	9/10
GameSpot	6/10
GamesRadar+	5/5
Hardcore Gamer	5/5
IGN	8/10
NME	3/5
PC Gamer (US)	58/100
PCGamesN	9/10
Shacknews	9/10
Video Games Chronicle	3/5
VG247	3/5
VideoGamer.com	9/10

Senua's Saga: Hellblade II received "generally favorable" reviews from critics, according to review aggregator website Metacritic.

Writing for IGN, Tristan Ogilvie describes Senua's Saga: Hellblade II as a "six-hour tour across the human realm of Midgard" with "action sequences, stunning Nordic-inspired locations, and encounters with towering terrors." The protagonist, Senua, portrayed by Melina Juergens, delivers a performance of determination to battle through fear and self-loathing. The environments vary from "pits of blood and gristle" to "mountain treks beneath coral-colored skies and glimpses of aurora borealis." IGN gave the game a score of 8, praising its "heroine's journey," but noted that the combat system favors "cinematic spectacle over gameplay depth."

Johnny Chiodini from Eurogamer praised Hellblade II for continuing Senua's story with "grace, confidence, surprising brutality, and thundering conviction." The review appreciated the shift in narrative focus from Senua's personal struggles to her interactions with others, stating that the game is less about battling mental illness and more about a person with a mental condition embarking on a significant journey. Eurogamer highlighted Senua's character development, noting her more compassionate self-view and her management of psychosis rather than battling it.

GamesRadar+ described the game as "haunting, confrontational, and deeply cathartic," commending its graphics and sound design for creating immersion. The review mentioned that the game's narrative structure adds depth between puzzles, and despite some pacing issues, it's a scarier, tighter, and more impressive sequel.

Tom Bardwell from VideoGamer.com called Hellblade II "bleak, distressing, and unmissable," praising its thematic explorations and visual delights. The review noted the game's cinematic quality, with transitions between gameplay and cutscenes, and felt the sound design complemented the game's heavy themes.

=== Accolades ===
Awards and nominations for Senua's Saga: Hellblade II
Year	Ceremony	Category	Result	Ref.
2024	Golden Joystick Awards	Best Visual Design	Nominated	
2024	Golden Joystick Awards	Best Audio Design	Nominated	
2024	Golden Joystick Awards	Best Lead Performer (Melina Juergens)	Nominated	
2024	Golden Joystick Awards	Best Supporting Performer (Abbi Greenland & Helen Goalen)	Nominated	
2024	The Game Awards 2024	Best Narrative	Nominated	
2024	The Game Awards 2024	Best Audio Design	Won	
2024	The Game Awards 2024	Best Performance (Melina Juergens)	Won	
2024	The Game Awards 2024	Games for Impact	Nominated	
2025	New York Game Awards	Great White Way Award for Best Acting in a Game (Melina Juergens)	Nominated	
2025	52nd Annie Awards	Outstanding Achievement for Character Animation in a Video Game	Nominated	
2025	28th Annual D.I.C.E. Awards	Outstanding Achievement in Art Direction	Nominated	
2025	28th Annual D.I.C.E. Awards	Outstanding Achievement in Character (Senua)	Nominated	
2025	28th Annual D.I.C.E. Awards	Outstanding Achievement in Original Music Composition	Nominated	
2025	28th Annual D.I.C.E. Awards	Outstanding Achievement in Audio Design	Nominated	
2025	28th Annual D.I.C.E. Awards	Outstanding Technical Achievement	Nominated	
2025	Game Audio Network Guild Awards	Best Audio Mix	Won	
2025	Game Audio Network Guild Awards	Best Ensemble Cast Performance	Nominated	
2025	Game Audio Network Guild Awards	Best Game Foley	Nominated	
2025	Game Audio Network Guild Awards	Best Voice Performance (Melina Juergens)	Won	
2025	Game Audio Network Guild Awards	Dialogue of the Year	Nominated	
2025	25th Game Developers Choice Awards	Best Audio	Nominated	
2025	25th Game Developers Choice Awards	Best Narrative	Honorable mention	
2025	25th Game Developers Choice Awards	Best Technology	Nominated	
2025	25th Game Developers Choice Awards	Best Visual Art	Honorable mention	
2025	NAVGTR Awards 2024	Animation, Technical	Nominated	
2025	NAVGTR Awards 2024	Camera Direction in a Game Engine	Nominated	
2025	NAVGTR Awards 2024	Control Design, 3D	Nominated	
2025	NAVGTR Awards 2024	Direction in a Game Cinema	Nominated	
2025	NAVGTR Awards 2024	Game, Franchise Action	Won	
2025	NAVGTR Awards 2024	Lighting/Texturing	Won	
2025	NAVGTR Awards 2024	Sound Effects	Nominated	
2025	NAVGTR Awards 2024	Use of Sound, Franchise	Nominated	
2025	NAVGTR Awards 2024	Writing in a Drama	Won	
2025	21st British Academy Games Awards	Animation	Nominated	
2025	21st British Academy Games Awards	Artistic Achievement	Nominated	
2025	21st British Academy Games Awards	Audio Achievement	Nominated	
2025	21st British Academy Games Awards	British Game	Nominated	
2025	21st British Academy Games Awards	Game Beyond Entertainment	Nominated	
2025	21st British Academy Games Awards	Music	Nominated	
2025	21st British Academy Games Awards	Narrative	Nominated	
2025	21st British Academy Games Awards	Performer in a Leading Role (Melina Juergens as Senua)	Nominated	
2025	21st British Academy Games Awards	Performer in a Supporting Role (Aldís Amah Hamilton as Ástríðr)	Nominated	
2025	21st British Academy Games Awards	Performer in a Supporting Role (Abbi Greenland & Helen Goalen as The Furies)	Nominated	
2025	21st British Academy Games Awards	Technical Achievement	Won	
