= Senua (Hellblade) =

- Hellblade character
- Render of Senua from Hellblade: Senua's Sacrifice
- First appearance: Hellblade: Senua's Sacrifice (2017)
- Created by: Tameem Antoniades
- Voiced by: Melina Juergens
- Motion capture: Melina Juergens

In-universe information
- Origin: Orkney

Senua is the player character and protagonist of the Hellblade video game series which consists of the 2017 video game Hellblade: Senua's Sacrifice that marks her first appearance, as well the sequel Senua's Saga: Hellblade II. She is presented as a Pict warrior who experiences disturbances and hallucinations due to an undiagnosed mental disorder. As a result of Senua's internal struggle with her delusional beliefs, she is determined to travel to the Norse afterlife realm Helheim with the notion of rescuing the soul of her lover from the Norse goddess Hela following his killing by Norsemen invaders, which occurred prior to the events of Senua's Sacrifice.

Created by a development team led by director Tameem Antoniades at British video game developer Ninja Theory, Senua was the product of extensive research efforts conducted by the team into various topics like Celtic history, Norse mythology, and mental disorders. Her appearance, in particular her facial war paint and braided hair clumped with lime, is based on a popular belief about the way Celtic warriors would have looked. Senua is played by Ninja Theory employee Melina Juergens, who was initially used as a stand-in for the character while the team were adjusting their motion capture techniques early in development. Encouraged by Antoniades to channel her own emotions into the context of Senua's struggle, Juergens became the team's final choice to portray the character even though she had no prior acting experience.

The character of Senua has been met with a very positive reception. Several critics considered the portrayal of the character's mental health condition as a landmark representation of people with mental health disorders in the video game medium. Juergens' debut acting performance as Senua has earned critical acclaim, and is credited by critics to be instrumental to the generally positive reception of Senua's Sacrifice.

== Character development history ==
Senua's name is derived from a misnomer for Senuna, a Celtic goddess previously lost to recorded history. The name was re-discovered at Ashwell End in Hertfordshire in the year 2002. The goddess' name was originally read incorrectly as "Senua". The team modeled Senua's character archetype as a warrior woman after historical accounts of the Iceni queen Boudica, who led an uprising against the invading Roman Empire in the first century AD.

Senua's mental disorder originally occupied a less central role to the story of Hellblade: Senua's Sacrifice. During the team's research into Celtic culture and history, they discover that the Celts used the term "gelt" for a person who appeared to have been driven mad by a curse, grief, or the trauma of a battle, and that such individuals would often go on a self-imposed exile into the woods in search of penance, punishment and purgatory. The team saw this as an opportunity to develop Senua's backstory as a gelt who was stigmatized and isolated by her community due to her mental condition, and was eventually driven into exile. The Darkness, a malevolent entity which antagonizes Senua throughout the narrative of Senua's Sacrifice, is explained as the manifestation of the abuse and mistreatment she suffered at the hands of her father Zynbel during her youth.

Antoniades noted that mental trauma, or illness, is less noticeable than the suffering caused by physical trauma. Instead of relying on common tropes about mentally ill people in popular culture, Ninja Theory opted to consult mental health experts and non-profit advocacy groups to fully inform themselves about the true nature of psychosis and how it affects the minds of the mentally ill. Senua's struggle with the unruly voices in her head and her harrowing hallucinations is inspired by the experiences of a girl who resides at a "recovery college", an establishment which acts as both a health facility and an education institute for its patients. The team worked with a group of voice hearers to ensure that the auditory hallucinations experienced by Senua sound as realistic as possible. Senua's visual hallucinations, such as the flashbacks to her past or how several elements of a level appear brighter than they should be, were also based on descriptions from people with delusions.

Antoniades developed Senua's quest and trauma on the theory that the Norsemen would sacrifice the leaders of the tribes they had conquered to their gods, which motivates Senua to seek out Hela, the Norse goddess of death, in an attempt to bargain for the release of her lover Dillion's soul from Helheim. The narrative of Senua's Sacrifice was written in such a way that Senua must internalize and accept the logic and meaning behind a world that functions with a different set of rules from her perspective in order to complete her quest. One example of how this is integrated into the game is a puzzle mechanic where Senua must identify and match patterns from her surrounding environment, as she hears and sees things that other people do not. It is purposely left to ambiguity as to whether the things Senua sees are real or are in fact figments of her imagination. The resolution of Senua's story arc in Senua's Sacrifice is based on the insight the team gained from working with mental health experts, with the understanding that mentally ill individuals can learn to adapt to the hallucinations and delusional beliefs they experience, and that learning to live with them is part of their recovery process.

Game director and lead writer Tameem Antoniades indicated that the upcoming sequel, Senua's Saga: Hellblade II, builds on the first game's personal insight into psychosis to show "how madness and suffering shapes myths, gods, and religion". In a preview trailer, Senua is depicted with the persona of a fierce warrior, a departure from her quiet and shy personality sighted in Senua's Sacrifice.

=== Design ===
Senua's in-game model in Senua's Sacrifice is built from a combination of facial scans and motion capture technology. Her facial scans were produced from proprietary technology developed by a Serbian company, 3Lateral, and is based on the likeness of German freelance photographer and video editor Melina Juergens, who also portrays the character through performance capture and voice acting. The scanned results, described as "an order of magnitude higher" than Ninja Theory's prior projects which employed performance capture, is capable of capturing significant detail of the model's face, down to the cracks of makeup and when the nose wrinkles. Senua's visage is based on what the historical Picts were envisioned to look like, as they were a tribal culture that used to paint themselves in war paint using woad, and were thus named as such by the Romans due to their distinctive face-painting practices. Antoniades conceded that surviving records from the time of the Picts are sparse, and their actual painted designs have been lost to history. As a result, a creative decision was made to keep Senua's face paint simple, that is within the bounds of something that she would be able to self-apply to herself. The team made patterns on paper using paint and scanned it into the game, though the resulting scans still contain finger marks and other distinctive smears made by team members. Senua's hair is designed to match historical accounts of Picts who put lime on their hair to clump it up, which gives it a striking dreadlock-like look. The team decorated her hair with a variety of small stones and beads: this was for the sake of art design as opposed to historical accuracy, as they serve a flourishing purpose by holding her hair together and brightening up the darkness of her character model.

Senua's clothing, designed with consideration for her personality and mental condition, provides significant insight into her past. Her headpiece represents a physical reminder of her internal struggle, with the idea that she wears it as a "kind of protector" due to the voices that intrude into her head. Antoniades noted that the Celts from Senua's time period were in fact skilled craftsmen in spite of their reputation as a "barbarian" culture; her jewelry is designed to be "incredibly ornate", and her furred collar made from wolf fur. Her brooch is a warrior pin which resembles a miniature sword, symbolically representing her warrior status conferred to her by Dillion. According to Antoniades, the brooches were originally Celtic pins favored by women from Senua's era, but were later appropriated by the Vikings who took a liking to them, and would later become a common cultural motif in cultural or media depictions of Vikings. The brooch's design evokes the triquetra symbol which are a recurring feature in Celtic symbology, though the team lacked context as to the deeper meaning behind the symbolism as very few Celtic writings survive to the present day. Antoniades suggested from his team's research that it is "variously described as infinity", or that it originally had another meaning which became lost in time while Christianity eventually appropriated Celtic and Pagan symbolism to develop its doctrine of the Trinity.

As a warrior, Senua carries a sword which she uses to battle her opponents, though Senua's Sacrifice featured extended sequences which did not involve any combat sequences and she loses her sword at a certain point of the game's story. With regards to the mystical sword which replaces her lost weapon and which Senua recognizes as the legendary Gramr, Antoniades explained to Game Informer that it is not in fact important or significant to the story. Ninja Theory explained in a 2015 developer diary that the game's titular hell is the manifestation of Senua's mental illness, though Antoniades later commented that he thought of Senua herself as the eponymous "Hellblade". Another item carried by Senua throughout Senua's Sacrifice is a sack which contains Dillion's severed head, which she believes contains the soul of the departed; from Senua's perspective, the head appears to suck in breath through the sack on occasion. She also carries a mirror, which is based on a real Celtic mirror, and is made from polished iron which renders ambiguous reflections. Mirrors were believed to be magical during Senua's era and were important instruments used by druids, high-ranking religious leaders in ancient Celtic cultures, to see into the underworld.

Senua is redesigned for the upcoming sequel, Senua's Saga: Hellblade II. Tom McInerney is the makeup artist responsible for the character's new look, which includes a different combination of face paint colours as well as mystical rune-like markings drawn on Juergen's face.

=== Portrayal ===
Senua was originally meant to be played by a professional actress, who dropped out of the role early in the game's development. In an interview with PC Gamer in August 2017, Antoniades admitted that Ninja Theory lacked the budget to hire an actress to commit to the role. Shortly after Senua's initial actress left the project, Juergens was asked to jump in and try on the motion capture equipment to help the team run some tests as she was already a constant presence in the background filming material for her work. The process involved connecting Juergens to an array of microphones and cameras, while her movements and expressions are transposed live onto a CGI model of Senua. A few weeks afterwards, the team asked her to enact an actual scene from the game's script for further tests. A self-described shy person, Juergens was initially hesitant to participate because the scene involved intense emotional expressions like crying and screaming which she would have to do in front of her colleagues, but later acquiesced to their request. Antoniades was impressed by her performance and decided to offer her the role, even though her job scope were originally confined to tasks like developer diaries and behind-the-scenes vignettes for Senua's Sacrifice. Juergens accepted, though she also continued with her video editing duties.

Commenting on his decision to offer the part of Senua to Juergens, Antoniades suggested that Juergens was able to embody the character by reliving her own "internal pain". As she never studied acting or had any acting experience prior to the development of Senua's Sacrifice, Juergens leaned on personal experiences from her own life and connected her recollections of traumas and anxiety to Senua's scenes in Senua's Sacrifice. To prepare for a scene, she would often sit in a room by herself for half an hour and connect herself into emotionally distressing mental scenarios, then getting up and leaving as soon as she is ready to begin the filming process. Juergens' motion capture scenes involved real emotions: for example, whenever she cried or screamed as Senua, she was legitimately crying and screaming. Juergens felt that her own existent anxiety issues contributed towards the character's emotional resonance, as it bridged the gap between her and Senua's trauma and pain. She also credited the facial scans provided by 3Lateral as well as the facial solving work provided by Cubic Motion in Manchester for enhancing her performance, to the point that every detail on her face were successfully translated to Senua's face which heightened the realism of her scenes. Reflecting on her work as Senua's actress with PCGamesN, Juergens indicated an interest in further work for the Hellblade series, citing the personal nature of its content and its message of removing the stigma surrounding mental health issues, and is open to pursuing potential acting work.

To prepare for her reprisal as Senua in Hellblade II and deliver a more realistic take of the character by emulating a "proper warrior", Juergens trained to do her own stunts and learn how to sword fight. Along with Antoniades, Juergens did research on sword fighting and different courses early in development, and found a screen combat academy near London where she took a film combat course. She worked with C.C. Smiff, who coordinated sword fight sequences in projects such as the Star Wars sequel trilogy and the Game of Thrones television series. Juergens increased the intensity of her fitness training sessions, but found it challenging as she needs a lot of time to recover after every session because she suffers from a chronic pain condition called fibromyalgia, with symptoms including fatigue as well as recurring pain in her bones and joints. Juergens had trained for two years by June 2021, which resulted in her learning different fighting styles and systems. With the development team's focus on authenticity and realistic combat sequences, the extent of Senua's combat repertoire in the upcoming sequel will be limited to whatever moves Juergens could realistically execute during the motion capture process.

Juergens sometimes used objects as props to assist with the motion capture process; in September 2021, Ninja Theory released a behind-the-scenes video for Hellblade II which showed how still shots of Juergens' eyes were captured. Juergens would rest her chin on a household contraption made by a colleague from a stand, a wooden outside frame to center the shot, and a plunger. The top part consists of a taped headrest for Juergens's forehead, while the plunger provides stability to allow accurate shots to be taken by the camera.

== Appearances ==
Senua appears as the protagonist of Hellblade: Senua's Sacrifice, which is set in the late 8th century. Grieving from the grim discovery upon her return from self-imposed exile to her village that Dillion had been sacrificed to the Norsemen's gods via the blood eagle, a ritualized method of execution, Senua embarks on a journey to Helheim. She is guided by her memories of her deceased friend and mentor Druth, a former slave of the Norsemen who used to tell her stories about Norse legends, which inspired her quest to save Dillion's soul from the Norse gods. Senua also believes that she is cursed to hear the voices of spirits, referred to as "Furies", in her head. Plagued by her own inner darkness, it manifests as externally focused visions and phantasms, which she must battle in order to continue her quest. Her backstory is unveiled over the course of the game's story through her hallucinations, which includes traumatic memories of her father Zynbel and the violent death of her mother Galena, who was also mentally ill, by her husband's hand. At the ending of Senua's Sacrifice, she realizes that it is impossible to bring Dillion back from the dead, and comes to terms with her loss and accepts the voices she hears as well as the hallucinations she experiences as a part of herself.

Senua returns as the protagonist in the sequel Senua's Saga: Hellblade II, which takes place in 9th century Iceland.

== Reception ==
Senua has garnered widespread critical acclaim. For their work with Senua, Ninja Theory was awarded Outstanding Achievement in Character at the 21st Annual D.I.C.E. Awards, and Best Character at the 2018 edition of the Italian Video Game Awards. Senua was also the subject of Ninja Theory's nomination for Outstanding Achievement for Character Animation in a Video Game at the 45th Annie Awards. For her performance as Senua, Juergens was awarded Best Performance at The Game Awards 2017, the Performer Award for the 14th British Academy Games Awards, and Performance in a Drama, Lead for the 2018 NAVGTR Awards. She also earned nominations for Best Gaming Performance and Breakthrough Award at the Golden Joystick Awards 2017. Juergens noted that she had been approached about acting opportunities after The Game Awards 2017.

SYFY Wire named Senua, a "haunting creature with a complex history", their "Video Game Heroine of the Month" for April 2018, with Brittany Vincent lauding her "somewhat broken but strong" characterization as a "fascinating" example of an archetypal female protagonist. VentureBeat voted Senua as the best new gaming character of 2017, with staff member Dean Takahashi praising Juergens' "unrelenting performance" and the thought-provoking depiction of Senua's madness that makes her an unforgettable character. Polygon included Senua in their list of the 70 best video game characters of the 2010s decade, with Colin Campbell praising Ninja Theory for their thoughtful portrayal of Senua and her mental condition, which in his view was given "appropriate respect for a sensitive subject". Richard Scott-Jones from PCGamesN attributed a large part of the commercial and critical success enjoyed by Senua's Sacrifice to Juergens' performance as Senua.

Senua's Sacrifice was used as part of a study into whether video games reduce mental health stigma by researchers of Florida State University. The organizers of the study said they chose the game because it is "one of the best representations of mental health that exists in video games" and that respondents who played the video game as Senua tend to empathize with her experiences, and by extension seemingly desire less distance from individuals who are mentally ill. Senua has been discussed by some publications as part of an emerging wider trend with regards to the shifting portrayals of female characters in the video game medium during the 2010s.
